= List of programs broadcast by Channel 2 (Israel) =

This is a list of programs formerly broadcast by the Israeli Channel 2.

== Formerly broadcast by Channel 2 ==
=== Channel 2 productions ===
==== Entertainment programs ====
- Channel 2 prime time news (1993–2017) – currently hosted by Yonit Levi
- Uvda (1993–2017) – an investigative television program hosted by Ilana Dayan (broadcast on Telad and Keshet)
- Meet the Press (1996–2017) – a weekly television news/interview program hosted by Rina Matzliah.
- Eretz Nehederet (2003–2017) – a satirical entertainment show, featuring satirical references to current affairs of the past week through parodies of the people involved, as well as the thoughts of recurring characters. It is one of the most watched and influential shows on Israeli TV. It features a regular cast of comedians and actors, such as Eyal Kitzis, Tal Friedman, Mariano Idelman, Eli Finish, Orna Banai, Alma Zak, Dov Navon, Assi Cohen, Yuval Samo, Maor Cohen and Shani Cohen. (broadcast on Keshet)
- Ha-Olam Ha'Boker (2006–2017) – morning show hosted by Avri Gilad and Hila Korach (broadcast on Reshet)
- Monit Hakesef (2007–2017) – the Israeli version of Cash Cab, presented by Ido Rozenblum
- HaAh HaGadol (2008–2017) – the Israeli version of Big Brother, hosted by Erez Tal and Assi Azar (broadcast on Keshet)
- HaMerotz LaMillion (2009–2017) – Israeli version of the popular U.S. reality television game show The Amazing Race
- Matzav Ha'Uma (2010–2015) – a satirical entertainment show hosted by Lior Schleien (broadcast on Reshet until 2015 and continue in Channel 10)
- The Voice Israel (2012–2017) – reality television show searching for talented new vocalists; hosted by Michael Aloni (broadcast on Reshet)
- HaKokhav HaBa (2013–2017) – reality television show searching for talented new vocalists, hosted by Assi Azar (broadcast on Keshet)
- Raid the Cage (2013–2014) – a game show hosted by Avi Kushnir (broadcast on Reshet)
- The X Factor Israel (2013–present): reality television show searching for talented new vocalists; hosted by Bar Refaeli (broadcast on Reshet)
- Ha-Olam Ha'Erev (1990–1993)
- Hahamishia Hakamerit (1993–1997) – a weekly Israeli satirical sketch comedy program whose often surreal skits were characterized by a satirical point of view which did not spare the audience sensitive subjects such as politics, national security, the Holocaust and sex
- Fisfusim (1994–2008)
- Ha-Comedy Store (1994–1997) – a weekly entertainment program which consisted of different short nonsense-style skits
- Reshut HaBidur / Rishon Babidur (1994–2004) – talk show hosted by Dudu Topaz
- Zehu Ze Hai (1995–1998) – a weekly entertainment program which consisted of several short sketches
- Chartzufim (1996–1999) – an Israeli political satire television programme in the vein of Britain's Spitting Image
- Parpar Layla (1997–2000)
- Chalomot BeHakitzis (1998–2001)
- Rak Beyisrael (1998–2003)
- Shidurey HaMahapecha (2002)
- Mishak Makhur (2004–2006) – a comedy panel show
- Heichal Ha-Tarbut (2005–2006)
- Moadon Layla (2006–2007) – panel stand-up-like talk show

==== Sitcoms ====
- Hahamishia Hakamerit (1993–1997)
- Papa (1994)
- Itche (1994–1997)
- Shemesh (1997–2004)
- Ha-Chaim Ze Lo Hacol (2001–2011)
- Shotetut (2002–2003)
- Echad Ha'Am Echad (2003)
- Ramzor (2008–2014) – a comedy drama dealing with relationship issues from the men's point of view. Three friends are each in a different phase of their relationships. The married man is standing on the red light and can't move a finger without the approval of his control freak wife. The one having a stable relationship is standing on the yellow area which means his girlfriend keeps the leash very close to her, and his relative freedom is only an illusion. The single guy is running free on the highway of one-night stands. Each one of them gives a different interpretation for the terms of relationships between men and women through several comic situations. The show features Adir Miller, Lior Halfon, Nir Levy and Yael Sharoni. (broadcast on Keshet)
- Shnot Ha-Smonim (2013–2017)
- Amamiot (2014)
- 70 Milion Sibot Le-Osher (2014)
- Tsomet Miller (2016)

==== Reality and game shows ====
- Let's Make a Deal (1994–1996) – the Israeli version of the popular U.S. game show
- Lingo (1994–1996) – the Israeli version of the U.S. game show of the same name
- The Price Is Right (1994) – the Israeli version of the popular U.S. game show
- Wheel of Fortune (1994–2000) – the Israeli version of the popular U.S. game show
- The Fortress (1998–1999) – the Israeli version of the popular French reality television game show Fort Boyard
- Who Wants to Be a Millionaire? (1999–2003) – the Israeli version of the popular U.S. game show
- The Vault (2000–2007)
- We Won't Stop Singing (2002–2005)
- Kokhav Nolad (2003–2012) – reality television show searching for talented new vocalists; hosted by Zvika Hadar (broadcast on Keshet)
- The Ambassador (2005–2006) – Reality show based on the American TV show, The Apprentice, except contestants are competing for a job to defend Israel's reputation abroad. Candidates must strive to spin Israel's story most effectively and need not pay much attention to reality or the Palestinian point of view. The winner will be the person who best demonstrates the qualities of a professional advocate and presents Israel in the most positive light. Beginning in November, the show was an immediate hit, topping the ratings throughout its 12-week run. The final episode was watched by 1.5 million viewers, which equals 25% of the population.
- Nolad Lirkod (2005–2008)
- Rokdim Im Kokhavim (2005–2012) – a reality television show featuring celebrities with professional dance partners competing in ballroom and Latin dances; hosted by Avi Kushnir and Hila Nachshon, who were replaced by Guy Zu-Aretz and Yarden Harel in the final series
- The Successor (2006) – an Israeli competition show judged by mystifier Uri Geller. The show featured ten contestants competing to become the next great mentalist, to be determined by viewers voting by phone and online. The contestants performed their effects on celebrity guests each week.
- 1 vs 100 (2007–2013): game show hosted by Avri Gilad
- The Best of All (2016-201?)

==== TV series ====
- Ramat Aviv Gimel (1995–2000)
- Hafuch (1996–1998)
- Kesef Katlani (1996–1999)
- Florentine (1997–1998)
- Tironoot (1998–2001) and its sequel Miluim (1998–2001)
- Zinzana (1999–2005)
- Ha-Burganim (2000–2004)
- Bnot Brown (2002)
- Ahava Me'ever Lapina (2003–2005)
- Esti HaMekho'eret (2004–2006)
- Ima'lle (2005–2008)
- A Touch Away (2007)

==== Current affairs shows ====
- Live with Dan Shilon (1991–2000)
- Rafi Reshef (1996–2001)
- Pgisha Leylit (1996–2005)
- Reshet Al Ha'Boker (1996–2006)
- Shishi Va'Chetzi (1998–2003)
- Yair Lapid (2000–2007)
- Bulldozer (2004–2007)
- Shomer Masach (2005)

==== Youth shows ====
- Yom Yoman (1991–1993)
- Boker Shel Keif (1993–1995)
- Chalom Alieychem (1993–1998)
- Disney Time (1993–2002)
- Joseph the Storyteller (1994–1995)
- Michal's Carnival (1995–1997)
- Tush-Tush (1996–1997)
- Hachaverim shel Barney (1997–1999)
- Shoko Telad (1997–2002)
- Bravo (1998–2002)
- Ha-Sodot Shel Kineret (1998–1999)
- Mishpacha VaChetzi (1998–2001)
- Stagdam (1998–2000)
- Zoo Stories (2000)
- Twipsy on Reshet (2000–2001)
- Sofi Tofi (2001)
- Od Mishpacha VaChetzi (2008–2009)

=== Imported TV shows ===
==== Drama ====
- Ally McBeal
- Baywatch
- Chicago Hope
- Doogie Howser, M.D.
- Dr. Quinn, Medicine Woman
- Everwood
- Felicity
- Homicide: Life on the Street
- Judging Amy
- My So-Called Life
- Nip/Tuck
- NYPD Blue
- Oz
- Pacific Blue
- The Secret Life of Us
- Six Feet Under
- The Sopranos
- Sex and the City

==== Supernatural / sci fi / action ====
- The Adventures of Sinbad
- Alias
- Buffy the Vampire Slayer
- Cleopatra 2525
- Eerie, Indiana
- Highlander: The Series
- Jack of All Trades
- Martial Law
- The Outer Limits
- Space: Above and Beyond
- Time Trax
- The Twilight Zone
- Walker, Texas Ranger
- The X-Files

==== Comedy / sitcom ====
- ALF
- Becker
- Blackadder
- Boy Meets World
- Curb Your Enthusiasm
- Dave's World
- Dharma & Greg
- Dinosaurs
- Everybody Hates Chris
- Frasier
- The Fresh Prince of Bel-Air
- Friends
- Herman's Head
- Monty Python's Flying Circus
- Mr. Bean
- Seinfeld
- The Sinbad Show
- South Park
- Spin City
- Step by Step
- Who's the Boss?
- Roseanne
- Everybody Loves Raymond

==== Reality ====
- Survivor
- MasterChef Australia
- The Voice (US)

==== Sports ====
- WWF Superstars of Wrestling

==== Soap operas ====
- All My Children
- The Bold and the Beautiful
- Central Park West
- Home and Away
- Paradise Beach
- Santa Barbara

==== Children's ====
- 101 Dalmatians: The Series
- The Adventures of Tintin
- The Adventures of Tom Sawyer
- Aladdin
- All Dogs Go to Heaven: The Series
- Alvin and the Chipmunks
- The Angry Beavers
- Around the World in 80 Dreams
- Back to the Future
- Biker Mice from Mars
- Bosco Adventure
- Buzz Lightyear of Star Command
- Captain N: The Game Master
- Casper and the Angels
- Charlie Chalk
- Chip 'n Dale Rescue Rangers
- CityKids
- Clarissa Explains It All
- Chris Cross
- Conan the Adventurer
- Denver, the Last Dinosaur
- Doug
- DuckTales
- Fairy Tale Police Department
- Fievel's American Tails
- The Flintstones
- Flipper and Lopaka
- Gargoyles
- Goof Troop
- Grimm's Fairy Tale Classics
- Hey Arnold!
- Inspector Gadget
- Jem
- The Jetsons
- The Jungle Book
- Li'l Horrors
- The Little Mermaid
- Little Mouse on the Prairie
- Little Shop
- Looney Tunes
- The Magical Adventures of Quasimodo
- Masked Rider
- Miffy
- Mighty Morphin Power Rangers
- The New Adventures of Winnie the Pooh
- The New Woody Woodpecker Show
- Noddy's Toyland Adventures
- Oscar and Friends
- Phantom 2040
- Pinocchio: The Series
- Pippi Longstocking
- The Pondles
- Popeye and Son
- Power Rangers in Space
- Power Rangers Lost Galaxy
- Power Rangers RPM
- Quack Pack
- Rainbow Fish
- Rambo: The Force of Freedom
- Rechov Sumsum — Shara'a Simsim
- Rugrats
- Rupert
- Sabrina: The Animated Series
- Samurai Pizza Cats
- Scooby-Doo, Where Are You!
- The Smurfs
- Space Cats
- Spider-Man
- The Super Mario Bros. Super Show!
- TaleSpin
- Teenage Mutant Ninja Turtles
- Thumbelina: A Magical Story
- Thunderbirds
- Timon & Pumbaa
- Top Cat
- Toucan Tecs
- Twinkle, the Dream Being
- Twipsy
- Widget
- The Wind in the Willows
- X-Men: The Animated Series
- Yogi's Gang
- Yogi's Treasure Hunt
