= List of Israeli films of 2010 =

2010 in the Israeli film industry.

== Israeli films screened at commercial screenings ==
The following is a list of Israeli films released in the year 2010.

Premiere		Title	Director	Cast	Genre	Notes	ref
F B R	25	Phobidilia (Hebrew: פובידיליה)	Yoav Paz; Doron Paz	Ofer Shechter, Efrat Boimold, Shlomo Bar-Shavit, Efrat Dor	Drama		
M A R	1	Haiu Leilot (Hebrew: היו לילות, lit. "Those Were The Nights")	Ron Ninio	Moshe Ivgy, Dana Ivgy, Evgenia Dodina	Drama		
M A Y	3	Kavod (Honor) (Hebrew: כבוד, lit. "Honor")	Haim Bouzaglo	Ze'ev Revach, Shmil Ben-Ari, Amos Lavi	Crime, Drama, Thriller		
M A Y	17	The Wanderer (Hebrew: המשוטט)	Avishai Sivan		Drama		
J U N	24	The Matchmaker (Hebrew: פעם הייתי, lit. "Once I Was")	Avi Nesher	Adir Miller, Dror Keren, Maya Dagan, Dov Navon, Yarden Bar Kochba	Drama		
J U L	10	...Be yom hashlishi (Hebrew: ביום השלישי, lit. "On the third day")	Moshe Ivgy	Sharon Alexander, Hila Feldman	Drama		
J U L	24	A Film Unfinished (Hebrew: שתיקת הארכיון, lit. "The silence of the archive")	Yael Hersonski		Documentary, Drama	Israeli-German co-production	
A U G	5	Zohi Sdome (Hebrew: זוהי סדום, lit. "This is Sodom")	Adam Sanderson and Muli Segev	Eli Finish, Assi Cohen, Mariano Idelman, Dov Navon, Tal Friedman, Alma Zak, Yuval Samo, Maor Cohen	Comedy, History		
A U G	10	The Human Resources Manager (Hebrew: שליחותו של הממונה על משאבי אנוש, lit. "The Mission of the Human Resources Manager")	Eran Riklis	Mark Ivanir, Rozina Cambos, Guri Alfi, Gila Almagor, Raymond Amsellem, Yigal Sadeh, Noah Silver, Julian Nagolesko	Drama		
D E C	12	Rabies (Hebrew: כלבת Kalevet)	Aharon Keshales, Navot Papushado	Lior Ashkenazi, Ania Bukstein, Yael Grobglas	Horror		
D E C	16	Naomi (Hebrew: התפרצות X, lit. "Eruption X")	Eitan Tzur	Yossi Pollak, Melanie Peres, Rami Heuberger, Orna Porat	Drama		

=== Unknown release date ===
Title	Director	Cast	Genre	Notes	Ref
2 Night	Roi Werner		Comedy, Drama, Romance		
The Flood (Hebrew: מבול, lit. "Flood")	Guy Nattiv		Drama		
A Promised Land	Shahaf Michael		Drama, Family, History		
Bein HaShmashot (Hebrew: בין השמשות, lit. "Between the window panes")	Alon Zingman		Drama		

== Awards ==
=== Ophir Award ===
Category	Winners
Best Film	The Human Resources Manager
Best Director	Eran Riklis; The Human Resources Manager
Best Actor	Adir Miller; The Matchmaker
Best Actress	Maya Dagan; The Matchmaker
Best Supporting Actor	Michael Moshonov; The Flood
Best Supporting Actress	Rozina Cambos; The Human Resources Manager
Best Cinematography	Amnon Solomon; Infiltration
Best Screenplay	Noah Stollman; The Human Resources Manager
Best Composer	Avi Belleli; HaMadrich LaMahapecha
Best Original Score	Gil Toren, Asher Milo; The Human Resources Manager
Best Documentary Feature	Precious Life

=== Wolgin Award ===
Category	Winners
Best Feature Film	Intimate Grammar
Best Documentary	A Film Unfinished
Best Short Film	Yellow Mums

== Notable deaths ==
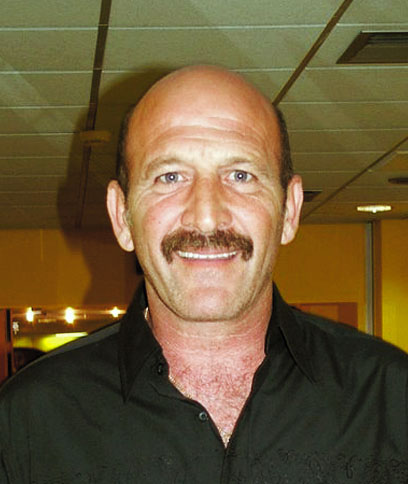
Amos Lavi

- January 9 – Nadav Levitan, 64, Israeli film director and screenwriter - lung disease. (born 1945)
- November 9 – Amos Lavi, 57, Israeli actor - lung cancer. (born 1953)

== See also ==
- 2010 in Israel
