= Zohi Sdom =

2010 Israeli comedy film

- זוהי סדום
- Directed by: Muli Segev and Adam Sanderson
- Written by: Muli Segev; Asaf Shalmon; David Lipschitz
- Produced by: Moshe Edri; Leon Edri; Avi Nir; David Zilber; Muli Segev; Avi Nesher
- Starring: Eli Finish; Dov Navon; Assi Cohen
- Cinematography: Giora Bih
- Edited by: Ron Omer; Yaron Shilon
- Music by: Ran Shem Tov
- Release date: 5 August 2010
- Country: Israel
- Languages: Hebrew; Aramaic
- Budget: $3.5 million
- Box office: ₪16 million

Zohi Sdom (Hebrew: זוהי סדום, lit. 'This is Sodom') is an Israeli comedy feature film released on 5 August 2010. It was conceived and created by the team behind the television programme Eretz Nehederet, and directed by Muli Segev and Adam Sanderson. According to official figures, the movie was the most-watched Israeli film in the 25 years preceding it, with over half a million local tickets sold.

The film is a comical depiction of the Biblical story of Sodom and Gomorrah. It is centered on the families of Lot, the only righteous man in Sodom, and Bera the king of Sodom.

== Plot ==
The film starts with God (Eyal Kitzis) meeting Abraham (Moti Kirschenbaum) to sell monotheism. After Abraham declines, God promises to end Abraham's theft problem by destroying the city of Sodom, where the thieves are coming from, within three days. Abraham asks God to get his nephew Lot (Dov Navon) out of the city before he destroys it. God replays the command to his subordinates Raphael (Yuval Semo) and Michael (Maor Cohen).

Lot runs a lottery stall and collects the proceeds toward building a cultural center for Sodom's children. Lot's wife (Tal Friedman) is a former pop singer whose career went downhill after she married Lot. They have a single daughter, Charlotte (Alma Zak). Sodom is run by Bera (Eli Finish) the king of Sodom, a corrupt dictator surrounded by yes men, who has two sons—the elder and successful Nineveh (Assi Cohen) and the younger and stupid Liam (Mariano Idelman).

When Bera accidentally finds out that Sodom is about to be destroyed and Lot saved, he concocts a plan to switch places with Lot, as the archangels set to destroy the city had never actually seen Lot. He sends his elder son to seduce Charlotte, but to his chagrin his son falls in love. Bera tells Lot that he is ill and needs to get away from his usual surroundings, so they change places. As Lot takes the role of king, he becomes conceited and forgets his plans to help the children of Sodom.

Bera finds out that Nineveh plans to betray him for the sake of Charlotte, and has Nineveh imprisoned. He instead decides to wed his younger son Liam to Charlotte. Nineveh escapes and crashes the wedding, telling the guests that there is no food, so they start to riot. He tells everyone that Sodom is about to be destroyed, and Lot and Bera make their escape with their families. On their way out they are met by Raphael and Michael, who would only let Lot pass, but both Lot and Bera pretend to be Lot. Lot's wife betrays her husband and supports Bera. The angels propose splitting Lot's wife in two as in Solomon's Judgement, but even though Lot cares more about her, they assume that Bera is in fact Lot, and let him escape with Lot's wife.

Sodom is then blown up with dynamite, which Abraham witnesses and signs the contract with God. However, while it makes a big blast, no damage is done, and God tells his angels that it was a ploy to swindle Abraham into signing the contract. Bera brings Abraham the money from the wedding, and the latter accepts him into the family (not before circumcise him), while Lot remains to rule Sodom. It is shown that Sodom later moves to a more lucrative real estate location — Tel Aviv.

== Cast ==
Character	Actor
Bera, the king of Sodom	Eli Finish
Lot	Dov Navon
Nineveh, Bera's eldest son	Assi Cohen
Liam, Bera's younger son	Mariano Idelman
Lot's wife	Tal Friedman
Charlotte, Lot's daughter	Alma Zack
Archangel Raphael	Yuval Semo
Archangel Michael	Maor Cohen
God	Eyal Kitzis
Abraham	Moti Kirschenbaum
Isaac, Ishmael	Mariano Idelman
Hagar	Orna Banai
Secretary	Shani Cohen

== Reception ==
The film received mostly average to negative reviews. Critics cited the relative lack of satire, which characterized the Eretz Nehederet show, low level humor, and a very loose interpretation of the Biblical story. It was panned by Ma'ariv as being an elaborate PR stunt for Keshet Broadcasting. However, Pnai Plus praised it as one of the most well-planned Israeli comedies in recent decades, with a good humoristic flow and a high concentration of good jokes. In the years following its theatrical release, it has become a Cult film, for reasons which include its TV airings on Israeli Independence Day.
