= Mesudarim =

- Created by: Assaf Harel, Muli Segev
- Starring: Assaf Harel; Asi Cohen; Maor Cohen; Eran Zarhovich
- Country of origin: Israel
- No. of seasons: 2

Production
- Running time: 45 minutes

Original release
- Network: Keshet (TV)
- Release: 17 February 2007 – 1 August 2009

Mesudarim (Hebrew: מסודרים, meaning "settled [for life]" in Israeli slang) is an Israeli comedy-drama series which was broadcast on Keshet, Channel 2, during 2007–2009. The series starts when four friends - Tomer Levi (Asi Cohen), Erez Klyner (Eran Zarhovich), Guy Fogel (Assaf Harel) and Sagi Berlad (Maor Cohen) - sell their gaming startup company to an American corporation for 217 million USD, and depicts how the very different childhood friends deal with their newfound wealth. Other leading actors in the show's two seasons are Dan Shapira, Nimrod Kamer and Dov Glickman.

Episode 9 contains a rare crossover in Israeli television, which is with the drama Betipul.

Shortly after the conclusion of season 2, creator Asaf Harel and Keshet stated that further seasons would not be produced.

The format of Mesudarim was purchased by Fox Broadcasting Company.

On 11 February 2010, a clip from the show presenting a new gaming product was mistakenly published on Gizmodo as an actual upcoming gaming innovation.

Loaded, a British remake of Mesudarim, started screening on Channel 4 on 8 May 2017. This version stars Jim Howick, Samuel Anderson, Jonny Sweet and Nick Helm.
