= Eretz Nehederet =

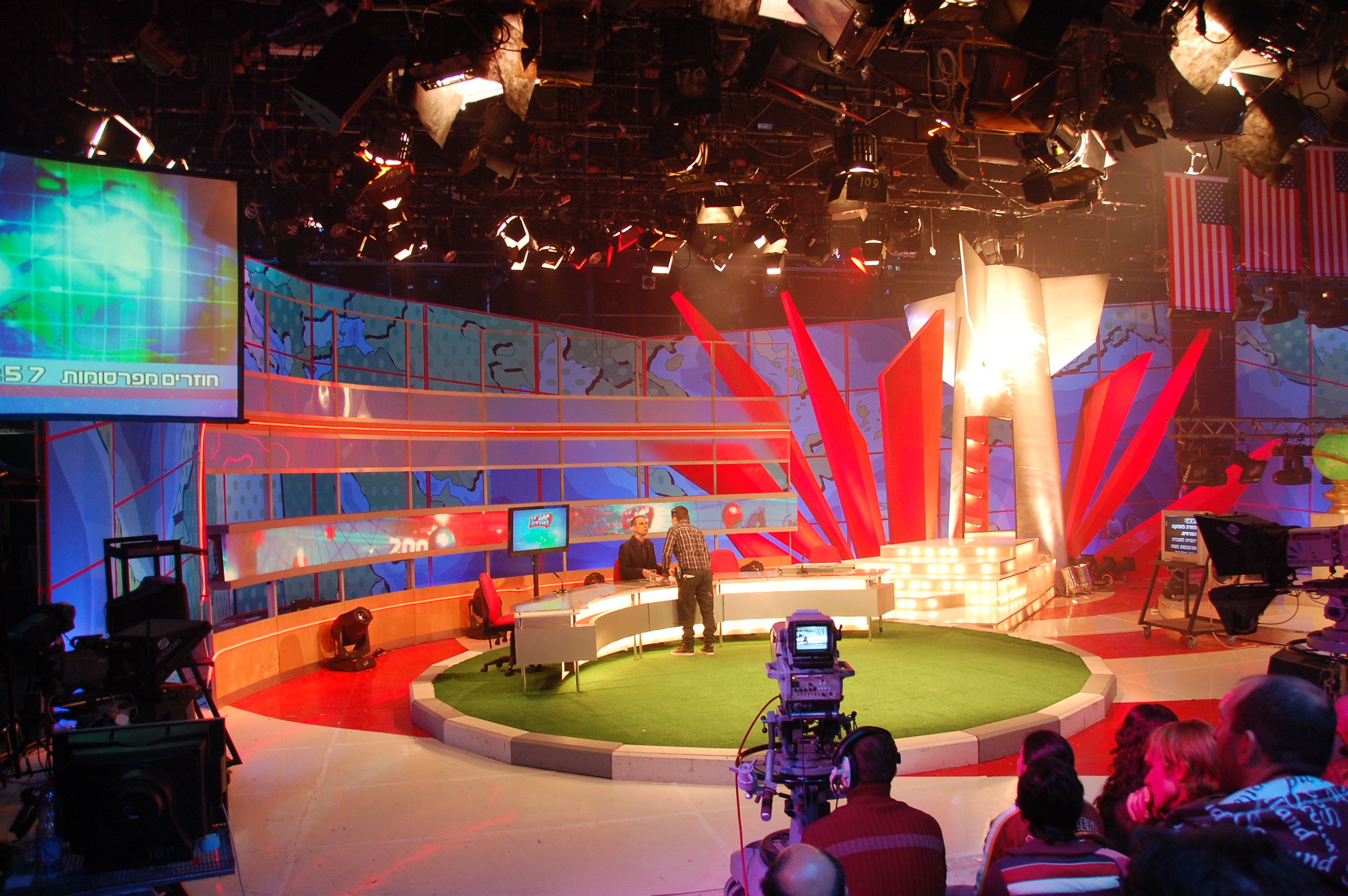
- Eretz Nehederet studio
- ארץ נהדרת
- Genre: Satire comedy Sketch comedy
- Created by: Muli Segev; David Lifshitz; Asaf Shalmon
- Country of origin: Israel
- Original language: Hebrew
- No. of seasons: 24
- No. of episodes: 357

Production
- Production location: Herzliya Studios
- Running time: 49 minutes
- Production company: Keshet Broadcasting

Original release
- Network: Channel 2 (Keshet) (2003–2017); Keshet 12 (2017–)
- Release: 2 November 2003 – present

Eretz Nehederet (Hebrew: ארץ נהדרת, lit. 'Wonderful Country') is an Israeli prime-time television satirical sketch comedy show that premiered on Keshet's Channel 2 in 2003. It features satirical references to current affairs of the past week through parodies of the people involved, as well as the thoughts of recurring characters. The program's concept is inspired by Saturday Night Live, The Daily Show and others. The program is one of the most watched and influential shows on Israeli television. It is also one of the longest-running scripted shows in Israeli television to date, running for 24 seasons as of 2026. Beginning with season 15, the program is aired on Keshet 12.

It was first filmed in Tel Aviv, and in later seasons, was filmed in the neighboring Herzliya.

The show features a regular cast of comedians and actors, including Tal Friedman (11 first seasons), Eyal Kitzis (the Jon Stewart-type host), Alma Zak, Orna Banai (6 first seasons), Shani Cohen (season 5 and on), Asi Cohen, Eli Finish, Mariano Edelman, Yuval Semo, Roey Bar Natan, Eran Zarachovitch, Yaron Berlad, Maor Cohen and Dov Navon (4 first seasons). During the third season, Asi Cohen started playing small roles on the show, and by the beginning of the fourth season (fall 2006), Cohen became a regular member.

Eretz Nehederet won the Israeli Television Academy's "Best Entertainment Program" in 2004 and again in 2006, and attracts millions of viewers every season. In a May 2008 poll, web surfers selected all the Season 5 Eretz Nehederet actors from into the top 60 Israeli comedians list. The top 7 spots were all taken by Eretz Nehederet, as well as #9 and #20.

In 2010, Eretz Nehederet produced a satire feature film called Zohi Sdom (lit. 'This is Sodom').

== Characteristics ==
The show includes satirical and humorous commentary on the events of the week preceding the episode, mainly through parodies, sketches, jokes, and satirical takes on the week's headlines. The show's format mimics a news television edition, where the sketches and various segments blend in as articles, interviews, and live reports seamlessly integrated within the "edition". In this manner, the program satirizes many of the characteristics of television culture itself and the broader mass media culture. It also lampoons the situations and figures that generate headlines and, in a broader sense, Israeli reality as a whole.

The show gained a high rating from the very beginning. Its creator and chief editor is Keshet's Content Director, Muli Segev. The program was given its name by Dana Modan, Segev's partner at the time, from a line in Yehoram Gaon's song "Shalom Lach Eretz Nehederet" (Segev recalls that Modan was inspired by the phrase "We have a wonderful country," which Benjamin Netanyahu used in an election campaign against Shimon Peres).

Eretz Nehederet first aired on November 2, 2003. The first season was broadcast on Friday evenings. Its basic format, relying on a team of actors and comedians, and combining satirical and comedic content proved itself and gained success. The Israeli entertainment program drew inspiration from the American shows Saturday Night Live and other programs like The Daily Show. The show has become one of the longest-running television programs in Israel, with 20 seasons produced as of 2022.

== Format ==
"Eretz Nehederet" is structured like a satirical news edition, featuring politicians, public figures, celebrities, and fictional characters as guests every week. The host of the show, Eyal Kitzis, is presented as the sole serious figure who openly anticipates meaningful responses from his guests, often serving as the mediator and "the straight man" for most of the jokes. Additionally, Kitzis interviews the foreign correspondents, who appear intermittently throughout the program (until mid-season 11 when he was replaced by Sharon Taycker). At the end of each episode, Kitzis bids farewell to the viewers with the recurring phrase, "And don't forget, we have a wonderful country".

The show's team consists of regular participants who sometimes change between seasons, and is occasionally strengthened by guest appearances by other well-known artists from various fields. The actors portray a wide range of diverse and ever-changing characters that form the essence of the program. These characters are often caricatures of figures in Israeli politics, public figures, and familiar media personalities, presented in a satirical and exaggerated manner. Some of the portrayed characters are entirely fictional, representing stereotypes and common phenomena in Israeli society. In later seasons, the show introduced various sketches created by emerging comedians who were not part of the regular team and were not directly involved in current events. These sketches often began as viral videos on YouTube and other online platforms.

The show's structure, apart from special episodes and selected segments, remains consistent with minor changes between each season:

- Main sketch: An in-studio sketch that opens the show, often characterized by extreme and provocative elements.
- Main panel: Eyal Kitzis interviews studio guests from the week's political agenda.
- Headlines satire: A collection of satirical news headlines. Starting from the 11th season, Alma Zack presented the headlines alongside Kitzis for a while. In the 13th season, the headlines became a separate segment called "Additional Headlines" airing on Fridays. In the 14th season, this segment returned with a different format.
- Secondary panel: Eyal Kitzis interviews guests from the fields of culture, entertainment, and sports.
- Additional headlines segments.
- Field reporting: Segments addressing common phenomena in Israeli society.
- External productions: Mini-shows hosted and produced by various individuals, both well-known and newcomers.
- Recurring sketches: A series of sketches critiquing an Israeli group or phenomenon, airing throughout the season.

== Characters ==
Following is a list of characters shown in Eretz Nehederet, both parodied real-life persons, and entirely fictional characters.

Characters	Actor	Type
Baba Luba (Russian supermarket worker)	Tal Friedman	Fictional
Hizki (Tour guide)	Tal Friedman	Fictional
Mahmoud Abu Tir	Tal Friedman	Parody of Muhammad Abu Tir
Ariel Sharon	Tal Friedman	Real-life
Vladimir Putin	Tal Friedman	Real-life
Ehud Barak	Tal Friedman	Real-life
Ehud Olmert	Tal Friedman	Real-life
Haim Yavin	Tal Friedman	Real-life
Assi Dayan	Tal Friedman	Real-life
Uri Zohar	Tal Friedman	Real-life
Shosh Atari	Tal Friedman	Real-life
Adele	Tal Friedman	Real-life
Shelly Yachimovich	Tal Friedman	Real-life
Modern Talking	Eli Finish (Thomas Anders), Tal Friedman (Dieter Bohlen)	Real-life
Barack Obama	Eli Finish	Real-life
Bashar al-Assad	Eli Finish	Real-life
Shimon Peres	Eli Finish	Real-life
Moshe Katsav	Eli Finish	Real-life
Eli Yishai	Eli Finish	Real-life
Yigal Amir	Eli Finish	Real-life
Aviv Geffen	Eli Finish	Real-life
Yuval Shemtov (Note: Known by his stage name Yuval Hamevulbal, which means "Confused Yuval")	Eli Finish	Real-life
Avi "Yossi" Mazaliko (A Sderot resident)	Eli Finish	Fictional
Giovanni Rosso	Eli Finish	Real-life
Yair Lapid	Eli Finish (formerly Mariano Edelman)	Real-life
Oded Menashe	Eli Finish	Real-life
Uzi Cohen	Eli Finish	Real-life
Yahya Sinwar	Eli Finish	Real-life
Tomer White Glasses	Eli Finish	Real-life
Eyal Berkovic	Mariano Edelman	Real-life
Itzik Zohar	Mariano Edelman	Real-life
Diego Maradona	Mariano Edelman	Real-life
Muammar Gaddafi	Mariano Edelman	Real-life
Benjamin Netanyahu	Mariano Edelman	Real-life
Shaul Mofaz	Mariano Edelman	Real-life
Amir Peretz	Mariano Edelman	Real-life
Condoleezza Rice	Mariano Edelman	Real-life
Margalit Tzan'ani	Mariano Edelman	Real-life
Pnina Rosenblum	Mariano Edelman	Real-life
Dora the Explorer	Mariano Edelman	Cartoon character
Hillary Clinton	Alma Zack	Real-life
Yonit Levi	Alma Zack	Real-life
Galit Gutmann	Alma Zack	Real-life
Hanny Nahmias	Alma Zack	Real-life
Tzipi Shavit	Alma Zack	Real-life
Tzipi Livni	Alma Zack (formerly Orna Banai)	Real-life
Limor Livnat	Orna Banai	Real-life
Ruhama Avraham	Orna Banai	Real-life
Judy Shalom Nir-Mozes	Orna Banai	Real-life
Raymond Abkasis	Orna Banai	Real-life
Sigal Azrieli	Orna Banai	Parody of Inbal Gavrieli
Dafna Dekel	Orna Banai	Real-life
Avigdor Lieberman	Asi Cohen	Real-life
Gabi Ashkenazi	Asi Cohen	Real-life
Tal Brody	Asi Cohen	Real-life
Avi Nimni	Asi Cohen	Real-life
Mohammad Bakri	Asi Cohen	Real-life
Uri Geller	Asi Cohen	Real-life
Dedi Dadon	Asi Cohen	Fictional
Guy Zohar	Asi Cohen	Real-life
Mooki	Asi Cohen	Real-life
Yonah Shamir	Yuval Semo	Parody of Yitzhak Shamir
On Perlin (Olmert's PR advisor)	Yuval Semo	Fictional
Miri Regev	Yuval Semo	Real-life
Hassan Nasrallah	Yuval Semo	Real-life
Mosh Ben Ari	Yuval Semo	Real-life
Meni Tzurel (Note: Known by his stage name Meni Mamtera, which means "Meni the Sprinkler")	Yuval Semo	Real-life
George W. Bush	Maor Cohen	Real-life
Arik Einstein	Maor Cohen	Real-life
Zohar Argov	Maor Cohen	Real-life
Mosko Alkalai	Maor Cohen	Real-life
Gilad Tarhan	Maor Cohen	Parody of Gilad Erdan (to the style of The Mask)
Sofa Landver	Shani Cohen	Real-life
Dorit Beinisch	Shani Cohen	Real-life
Anastassia Michaeli	Shani Cohen	Real-life
Tzipi Livni	Shani Cohen	Real-life
Limor Livnat	Shani Cohen	Real-life
Eden Harel	Shani Cohen	Real-life
Michal Weitzman (Note: Known by her stage name, Michal Haktana, which means "Little Michal")	Shani Cohen	Real-life
Miriam Feirberg	Roey Bar Natan	Real-life
Gidi Gov	Roey Bar Natan	Real-life
Danny Danon	Roey Bar Natan	Real-life
Gideon Sa'ar	Roey Bar Natan	Real-life
Ariel Atias	Roey Bar Natan	Real-life
Amir Fryszer Guttman	Roey Bar Natan	Real-life
Bamba's Baby	Yaron Berlad	Cartoon Character
Netta Barzilai	Tom Yaar	Real-life
Benny Gantz	Lior Ashkenazi (formerly Roey Bar Natan)	Real-life
Yoni Rechter	Lior Ashkenazi	Real-life
Courteney Cox	Liat Har Lev	Real-life
Anna Zak	Liat Har Lev	Real-life
Tuvia Tzafir	Yaniv Biton	Real-life
Yehuda Levi	Yaniv Biton	Real-life

== Notable sketches ==
Angry Birds Peace Treaty shot. A moment before the talks break badly.

In May 2010, a sketch played off tensions between Israeli prime minister Benjamin Netanyahu and American president Barack Obama, with Netanyahu trying to smooth over differences as they meet in the White House. A series of accidents caused Netanyahu to set the American flag on fire, stomp on it, and then torch a copy of Obama's proposed Middle East peace plan.

In November 2010, the group used the video game characters Angry Birds in a mock up peace treaty sketch, which satirized recent failed attempts in the Israeli–Palestinian peace process. The video quickly went viral across the world. It received favorable coverage from a variety of independent blogs such as Digital Trends, Hot Air, and Intomobile, as well as from online news media agencies such as The Christian Science Monitor, Haaretz, The Guardian, and MSNBC.

In May 2016, the group created an "ISIS at the Eurovision" sketch.

In 2023, the group produced several viral sketches titled Eretz Nilhemet (lit. 'A country at war') in the wake of the Israel–Hamas war, which would go on until 2025. The 2023 sketches mocked how BBC reported the al-Ahli Arab Hospital explosion, Gaza War protests at American universities and the UN Women investigation of sexual violence during the October 7 attacks. Another sketch featuring American comedian Michael Rapaport satirised the 2023 United States Congress hearing on antisemitism. In November 2023, the Eretz Nehederet sketch "Welcome to Columbia Untisemity", parodying US pro-Palestinian protests at universities amid the Israel–Hamas war, became a viral video on social media, garnering over 11 million views within 24 hours. The sketch featured student characters using the acronym "LGBTQH", with the "H" standing for "Hamas". The sketch was praised by some pro-Israel commentators, but also faced criticism for its usage of both anti-LGBT and anti-Arab stereotypes. On 13 December 2023, a song titled "Gaza's sky is black but Qatar is always sunny" was released; its accompanying video portrayed Hamas leaders Ismail Haniyeh, Khaled Mashal and Mousa Abu Marzook as billionaires living in Qatar.

== Reactions ==
In a speech on March 21, 2013, President Barack Obama quipped that "any drama between me and my friend, Bibi, over the years was just a plot to create material for Eretz Nehederet. [...] That's the only thing that was going on. We just wanted to make sure the writers had good material."

Canadian journalist and podcaster Malcolm Gladwell discussed the show on his podcast Revisionist History in an episode on satire. Gladwell discusses his own sadness at how American comedians like Tina Fey use satire to mock but never wish to have their point get across, and cites Eretz Nehederet as a key example of political satire done right.
