= Tomer White Glasses =

Israeli celebrity (born 1983)

- Tomer Shlomi
- Habima Square, escalators and stairs at the underground parking lot, which has served as a protected space during times of war, 2026
- Born: February 23, 1983 (age 43); Kiryat Ata, Israel
- Other name: תומר משקף לבן
- Education: Rogozin High School
- Occupation: Content creator
- Years active: 2026–present

Instagram information
- Page: המשקף הלבן
- Followers: 14,500

TikTok information
- Page: המשקף הלבן
- Followers: 6,392

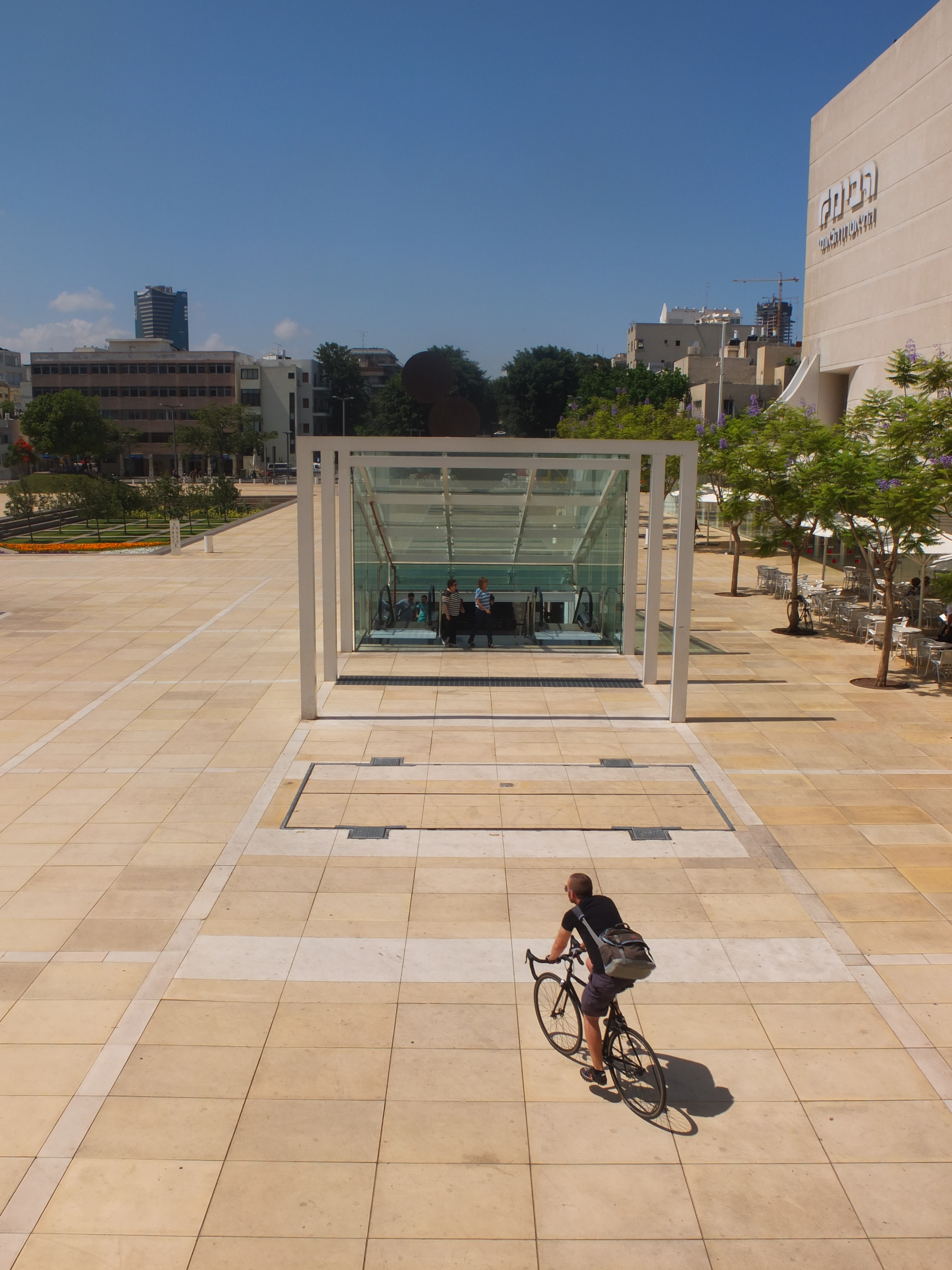
Habima Square's entrance to the parking lot, 2013

Tomer White Glasses (Hebrew: תומר משקף לבן, real name: Tomer Shlomi, in Hebrew: תומר שלומי; born on February 23, 1983) is an Israeli viral phenomenon who became popular during the war between Israel and Iran in 2026. His notoriety arose due to his recurring appearances behind television reporters in event coverage, such as during the entry of Israeli civilians into shelters during alarms – especially in the parking lot of the Habima Theatre, in Tel Aviv. In all of his media appearances, Tomer wears white glasses and a white shirt. He is a resident of Kiryat Ata, a former real estate agent, amateur extra, and a content creator, including a single called "Always in the Frame", released in March 2026. He competed with "Liran Gray Shirt", who was a similar phenomenon, and his mother, Lea Shlomi, spoke about him in an interview.

== Biography ==
Shlomi studied at Rogozin high school in Kiryat Ata. After finishing his studies, he worked as an extra for 12 hours a day, earning 15 shekels per hour, and tried to be accepted into reality shows, including The Amazing Race, but was declined. Since the beginning of the war against Iran, Shlomi turned the Habima Square into his home, sleeping on mattresses, showering at friends' houses and appearing in frame during news broadcasts.

Shlomi challenged Liran Gray Shirt live (both were from the Haifa region) and said he would conquer football stadiums. After that, they reconciled and talked in Habima Square. Liran claimed that he has been a brand for 25 years and that one cannot compete with him.

The actor Eli Finish impersonated Shlomi on the Israeli television show Eretz Nehederet. His rivalry with Liran was also portrayed in two separate sketches on the show, one of which was broadcast behind the host, Eyal Kitzis.

In April 2026, Shlomi participated in the program Big Brother and was filmed behind the news presenter who entered the Big Brother house while all the residents were standing still during a "freeze" task.

He participated in commercials for Wolt and Pizza Hut, appearing behind delivery workers during deliveries.

Internet memes were created about him, and he was seen in the background in Israeli films, among them Kazablan with Yehoram Gaon and Giv'at Halfon Eina Ona with the trio HaGashash HaHiver. The television presenter Yinon Magal, former member of the Knesset, created a meme of Yair Lapid as Tomer White Glasses and of Naftali Bennett as Liran Gray Shirt.

At the torch-lighting ceremony on Mount Herzl, on the 78th Independence Day of Israel, with the President of Argentina, Javier Milei, who also lit a torch, Shlomi was present and encouraged the audience in support of the head of the Mossad, Dadi Barnea. Following this, Shlomi participated in a broadcast at the Square studio.
