= Gaza's sky is black but Qatar is always sunny =

Single by Eretz Nehederet
- Released: 13 December 2023
- Recorded: 2023

Music video
- "Gaza's sky is black but Qatar is always sunny" on YouTube

"Gaza's sky is black but Qatar is always sunny" is a single by the Israeli satirical TV show Eretz Nehederet. Released during the Gaza war, the video features three Israeli comedians, Yaniv Biton, Shahar Hasson, and Mariano Idelman, portraying Hamas leaders Ismail Haniyeh, Khaled Mashaal and Mousa Abu Marzouk respectively, who are estimated by the Israeli embassy to the United States as having a combined net worth of $11 billion. The song is a parody of Thai rapper Lisa's 2021 single "Money".

The video was positively received by Israeli audiences and their corresponding newspapers. As of April 2024, the YouTube video for the single, initially released in December 2023, has accumulated nearly 2.5 million views, and a repost on Eretz Nehederet's Instagram Reels page has accumulated nearly 9.2 million views.

== Premise ==
The video begins with a woman in a video, played by comedian Shani Cohen, reading a message asking viewers to donate to Hamas, with a graphic of the money her video raised from across different Western countries being diverted from the Gaza Strip towards Qatar, then showing the three Hamas leaders along with their approximated net worths. The three then proceed to call in "Mia Khalifa" (portrayed by an impersonator) dressed as a nurse in Shifaa Hospital and invited by the three Hamas leaders to play the video game FIFA. Afterwards, Haniyeh, Mashal and Marzook complain that "their dog needs new Armani", before proceeding to order sushi with avocado, though initially mistake the delivery person for the Mossad. At the end of the video, two of the leaders ask the woman who made the video at the beginning to "cry harder", with their reasoning being that they need more money.

== Cast ==
- Yaniv Biton as Ismail Haniyeh
- Shahar Hasson as Khaled Mashal
- Mariano Idelman as Mousa Abu Marzook
- Shani Cohen as a Palestinian woman

== Reception ==
Eretz Nehederet, often viewed as its country's counterpart to the US show Saturday Night Live, was praised by media affiliated with or generally supportive of Israel for the single. Yulia Karra of ISRAEL21c noted "Gaza's sky is black but Qatar is always sunny" as an example of Eretz Nehederet's appeal to overseas supporters of Israel during the war between it and Hamas. The Jerusalem Post further praised the show, though centered its praise on Eretz Nehederet much more generally. The Jewish News Syndicate also posted positive coverage of the show's mocking of Hamas' leaders as a headlining piece of coverage focusing on many of Eretz Nehederet's content on the war.

Kveller, a Jewish parenting website, noted "Gaza's sky is black but Qatar is always sunny" as the most poignant example of its international language skits. Lior Zaltzman, writing for Kveller, sees the single as something that talks "truth to power", and criticizes ineffective leadership.

== See also ==
- We Con the World
