= Eyal Kitzis =

- אייל קיציס
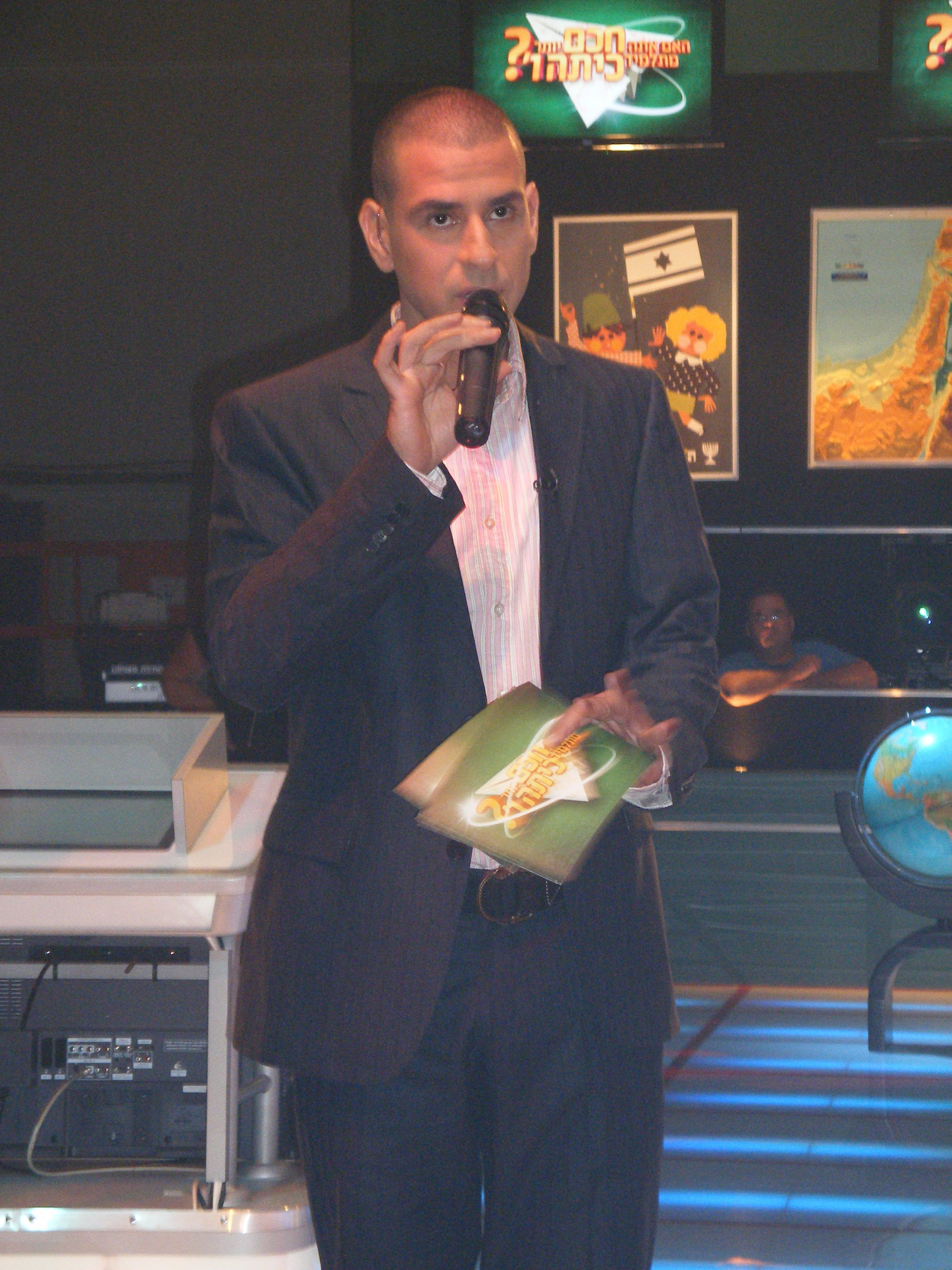
- Eyal Kitzis Hosting the Israeli version of Are You Smarter Than a 5th Grader?, 2007
- Born: 7 January 1969 (age 57); Kiryat Ono, Israel
- Occupations: Actor, comedian and TV host
- Years active: 1993–present
- Spouse: Tali Moreno

Eyal Kitzis (or Kitsis, Hebrew: אייל קיציס; born on 7 January 1969) is an Israeli actor, comedian and TV host.

He is currently known for presenting the satirical sketch show Eretz Nehederet.

== Early life ==
Kitziz was born in Kiryat Ono, Israel, to a Jewish family. He served as a soldier in the Israeli Air Force.

== Career ==
Kitzis began his career in 1993, as a host in the Israeli Educational Television shows "Zombit" and "Tik-Tak", while in addition, he wrote the humorist column "Tzipora" in the newspaper "Hadashot" and later on for the newspaper "Ha'ir". After he finished working for the newspapers, he wrote and published a humorist book called in 1999. Kitzis's big breakthrough came in 1998 when he hosted a humorous late night show titled "Halomot BeHaKitzis" along with the Israeli comedian Tal Friedman, which was broadcast on the Israeli Channel 2. Following the success of the show, Kitzis and Friedman worked together on the show "Nivheret HaHalomot" which also aired on the Israeli Channel 2. At the same time, they began hosting their own radio show called "Tziporey Laiyla Srutot" on Gali Tzahal.

After the rise of the Israeli humor channel "Bip", Kitzis and Friedman had a new show on that channel called "Lagaat BaOchel" (Lit. "Touch the food") in 2001, which was a parody of soap operas, and afterwards, in 2002, they both appeared in the show HaChet Ve Onsho" (Lit. "Crime and Punishment") which was a humorous game show. In addition, in 2003 Kitzis started hosting the show "HaDerbi HaGadol" (lit."The big derby") together with the Israeli comedians Eli and Mariano, and in 2004 the humorous reality show "Laughing Academy" together with Alma Zack. In 2003 Kitzis started performing as the host of the satirical television show Eretz Nehederet (lit. "Wonderful Land") alongside Tal Friedman, Orna Banai, Eli Finish, Mariano Idelman, Dov Navon, Alma Zack and other guest comedians, including Assi Cohen and Yuval Samo whom later on became part of the permanent staff of the show. The show gained massive success, both from the critics and from the Israeli audience. In the summer of 2007, Kitzis began hosting the Israeli version of the American trivia game show Are You Smarter Than a 5th Grader? on the Israeli Channel 2. In August 2007 Kitzis collaborated with Tal Friedman on the children's show on the Israeli Logi channel which was called "HaYeduanim" (lit. "The celebrities").

== Personal life ==
Kitzis has been previously married to Dalit Kidon, a PR person for the Israeli Channel 10. On 15 October 2009, Kitzis married the Israeli news anchorwoman Tali Moreno. He has one son.
