= Shani Cohen =

Israeli actress, comedian and voice actress

- שני כהן
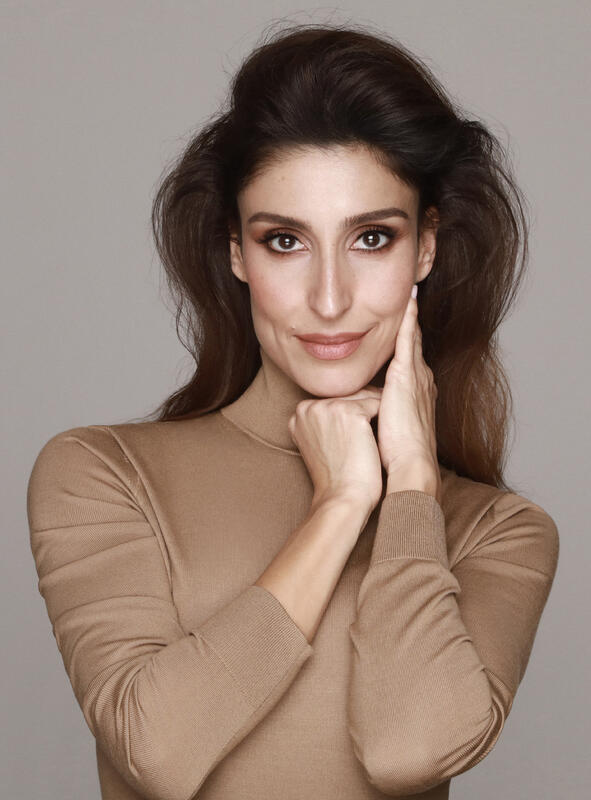
- Cohen in 2020
- Born: 7 September 1980 (age 46); Petah Tikva, Israel
- Occupations: Actress; voice actress; comedian
- Years active: 2004–present
- Known for: Eretz Nehederet
- Notable work: My Fair Lady, Danny Hollywood, The Cops, The Estate
- Spouse: Gilad Varobel

Shani Cohen (Hebrew: שני כהן; born 7 September 1980) is an Israeli actress, voice actress and comedian.

== Early life ==
Shani Cohen was born in Petah Tikva, the eldest daughter of Livni, a lawyer of Egyptian Jewish descent, and Laeti, an Israeli-born educator of Iraqi descent. In 1995, she moved with her family to Hod Hasharon, where she later attended Hadarim High School, majoring in theater. During her service in the Israel Defense Forces (IDF), Cohen served as a noncommissioned officer and a commander in the 101st Battalion of the Parachute Brigade.

In 2004, she completed three years of acting studies at SLA – The Theater Arts Studio, founded by Yoram Levinstein. Her classmates included Tali Sharon, Tali Rubin, and Rinat Matatov. During her studies, she performed in the play "A Happy New Year for Farmers in the North," written and directed by Yael Ronen, at the Zionist House of America.

== Career ==
=== Theater ===
In 2004 Cohen played Bruriah in the musical "King Solomon and Shalmay the Cobbler" by Sami Gronman directed by Ilan Ronen at the Habima Theater. In this musical she sang the song "Sir Eres". In 2005 she acted in the play "Taxi" written and directed by Sigal Avin as part of "Young Habima". In 2006 she played Louise in the play "The Nodnik" by Francis Weber directed by Moshe Naor. In 2013 she played Eliza Doolittle, the lead role in the musical My Fair Lady.

=== Television ===
In 2005 she starred in the movie "What are you talking about?" written by Avner Bernheimer (based on the short story "What's wrong with you" by Gafi Amir) and directed by Eitan Tzur. In December 2006, she operated and dubbed the doll Abigail in the first season of "Rechov Sumsum". In November 2007, she starred in eight special episodes of the show "Only in Israel" on Channel 2 of Keshet, in honor of 40 years of Israeli television. Cohen participated in the programs in the character of Sol Bar, the despised field reporter on Limor, who would do anything to be a respected interviewer, but without success. In 2007 she portrayed Sivan, Efrat's (Orna Banai) new partner in children's plays, in the series "Amal'la" on Channel 2 of Keshet, written by Tamar Marom and directed by Ram Nahari which aired on Channel 2. In 2008 she portrayed a fan in the series "Sholetz" from the yes home, created by Guri Alfi, Shachar Segal and Roi Bar Natan. In 2008-2009 she portrayed Noa Dayan in the series "Danny Hollywood" from the yes home, alongside Ran Danker, Shira Katzenelbogen, and Shai Feld. In those years she portrayed various characters in "Week's End" on Channel 2 of Reshet, which was the competing satire show.

Since 2010 she has been participating in "Eretz Nehederet", the franchisee Keshet's show. Among other things, she imitated on the show the characters of Dana Spector, Miri Bohadana, Sivan Rahav Meir, Inbal Or, Yael Poliakov, Ortal Amir, Eden Ben Zaken, Tzufit Grant, Rina Matsliach, Karin Goren and Karen Mertziano.

In 2017 she participated in the series "Falling on their feet". In 2011 she dubbed Lisa in the movie "Mars Needs Moms". Cohen previously appeared in a commercial for the fashion area at the Herzliya Arena mall.

From 2010 to 2020 Cohen was the presenter of the publicity campaign for "9,000,000", the brand of I.D.I. Insurance company, playing the secretary of the fictional agent "Shouka".

In 2018, Cohen dubbed the character of Ollie the elephant in the musical series bearing his name "Ollie the Elephant" which aired on the Educational Television. Since 2020, she has been portraying the character of Dafna in the series "The Estate".

In 2021 Cohen began participating in the series "The Cops", portraying the wife of the series hero Alon Shenhav, played by Tzachi Halevy. That year, she also starred alongside Yaniv Biton in the drama series "Alumim".

=== Cinema ===
In 2010 she played a voice secretary in the film Zohi Sdom directed by Adam Sanderson and Muli Segev.

In 2023, she participated in Gigit and Hiel Kabiri's film Sand Grains, in the role of Iris. In the same year, she also played in Avi Nesher's film, Gan Kofim.

== Personal life ==
Her younger sister Gal was diagnosed with Non-Hodgkin lymphoma while in 10th grade at Hadarim High School in Hod Hasharon, and died from the disease in August 2002 at the age of 18. Which Shani says had a great impact on her later in life.

Cohen married Gilad Varobel, and they reside in Tel Aviv.
