= Bera (king) =

Biblical king of Sodom

Bera (Hebrew: בֶּ֫רַע Beraʿ; possibly meaning "gift", Greek: Βάλλα βασιλέως Σοδόμων: Balla, king of Sodom) was the king of the city of Sodom according to the Hebrew Bible. His interactions with Abram, later called Abraham, are recorded in Genesis 14. Rabbi Meir suggested that his name signified that he was an "evil son" (ben ra' ), an interpretation which Gottheil and Levi describe in the Jewish Encyclopedia as "playful".

== Biblical account ==
In Genesis 14:2, the text says:

They [Chedorlaomer and his allies] made war with Bera king of Sodom, Birsha king of Gomorrah, Shinab king of Admah, Shemeber king of Zeboiim, and the king of Bela (that is, Zoar).

In this narrative, Bera joins four other Canaanite city kings in rebelling against Chedorlaomer, an Elamite king, and his allies who rule a vast area. In the Battle of the Vale of Siddim, the combined imperial forces plunder Sodom and nearby cities, taking many people captive and also much plunder. Bera and the king of Gomorrah, Birsha, flee the battle and fall into one of Siddim's many tarpits, while other survivors escape into the mountains. Abram's nephew Lot is captured during the battle, leading Abram (later Abraham) to engage in a rescue expedition.

Later in the same chapter, after Abram has rescued Lot and the possessions of the rebel kings captured by Chedorlaomer, "the king of Sodom" is the representative king who meets with Abram, and a dialogue between Abram and king is recorded:

The king of Sodom said to Abram, "Give me the persons, but take the goods for yourself." But Abram said to the king of Sodom, "I have lifted my hand to the Lord, God Most High, Possessor of heaven and earth, that I would not take a thread or a sandal strap or anything that is yours, lest you should say, 'I have made Abram rich.' I will take nothing but what the young men have eaten, and the share of the men who went with me. Let Aner, Eshcol, and Mamre take their share." (Note: Genesis 14:13 refers to Abram living by the oaks of Mamre the Amorite, brother of Eshcol and of Aner, ... Abram's allies.)

== Scholarly discussion ==
The account of Melchizedek's blessing of Abram in verses 17-20 has been described as a "parenthetical" insert into the story of Abram and Bera, although Methodist writer Joseph Benson also observes that Abram uses in verse 22 the same words, referring to "the most high God, the possessor of heaven and earth", which Melchizedek has used in his blessing. Benson surmises that Abram might have thought of Bera as "a proud and scornful man", liable to reproach Abram later if he has in any way profited from retrieving the possessions of the king.

Scholars are divided on Genesis 14 as a whole: opinions range, according to Frances Anderson, from those who identify Genesis 14 as a piece of late fiction about an Abraham who bears little resemblance to the patriarch in the rest of Genesis" to scholars "willing to find some historical foundation" behind the narrative in that chapter.

== In popular culture ==
In the Israel film Zohi Sdom, roughly based upon the Biblical tale of Sodom and Gomorrah, King Bera is portrayed by actor Eli Finish as the corrupt dictator of the city.
