= Alumim (TV series) =

Israeli TV series (2021– )

- Also known as: Unknowns
- Hebrew: עלומים
- Genre: Drama; Thriller
- Created by: Guy Sidis; Nirit Yaron; Tawfik Abu-Wael
- Written by: Tawfik Abu-Wael; Guy Sidis; Nirit Yaron; Shira Porat
- Directed by: Tawfik Abu Wael
- Starring: Yehuda Levi; Shani Cohen; Yaniv Biton; Ofek Pesach; Amir Tessler
- Music by: Ran Bagno
- Country of origin: Israel
- Original language: Hebrew
- No. of seasons: 1
- No. of episodes: 9

Production
- Producers: Amit Dekel; Nirit Yaron
- Running time: 50 minutes
- Production company: Rabel Films

Original release
- Network: Kan 11
- Release: 4 October 2021 – present

Alumim (Hebrew: עלומים), also distributed under the English title Unknowns, is an Israeli television series broadcast on Kan 11. Created by Guy Sidis, Nirit Yaron, and Tawfik Abu Wael, the series is based on the experiences of Sidis in a school for at-risk students and Abu Wael's childhood in a disadvantaged community in Israel.

The show began broadcasting on 4 October 2021 and concluded its first season on 1 November 2021. On the night of the finale, it was publicized that due to its success the show was expected to be renewed for a second season.

As of July 2022, Alumim had been acquired for broadcast in France, Australia, Spain, Portugal, Belgium, and Luxemburg.

== Plot ==
The show centers around a group of boys at a school for at-risk youth in Beit Shemesh who become suspects in a criminal investigation after a girl is found dazed and beaten in a nearby forest.

== Awards ==
Alumim was nominated for 13 awards at the Israeli Television Academy Awards in 2021 of which it won 3, including Best Drama Series and Best Lead Actor in a Drama Series (for Amir Tessler).

The show was also selected to compete in the Cannes International Series Festival in 2021.

== Characters ==
=== Main characters ===
- Osher Malka (Amir Tessler) – A young man who wishes to improve his chances of joining the Israel Defense Forces (IDF) following a record-clearing process taking place at the school.
- Menachem Zada (Ofek Pesach) – The leader of most of the boys at the school, involved in drug trafficking on behalf of his abusive brother.
- Avner Kashi (Yaniv Biton) – An investigator at the local police station and Naomi's husband.
- Naomi Kashi (Shani Cohen) – Avner's wife. A teacher at the school who has a deep affection for the boys.
- Yaniv Tal (Yehuda Levi) – A businessman from Tel Aviv who is doing community service at the school as a result of his girlfriend committing a major fraud.

=== Supporting Characters ===
- Yinon (Ben Sultan) – One of Menachem's henchmen.
- Eli (Ilai Daboul) – Another of Menachem's henchmen.
- Geula (Ravit Yaakov) – The school principal.
- Betty (Dani Hertzi'ano) – The school secretary.
- Meital Malka (Rona-Lee Shimon) – Osher's mother. She is a drug addict and in a relationship with Hussam, a drug dealer.
- Wassa Awaka (Yaniv Almanach) – A young man aspiring to be a musician and join a military band, accused of raping a girl. He committed suicide while in detention.
- Yehuda Cohen (Oren Pasu) – A local police investigator, Avner's partner, and close friend.
- Ronit (Amit Zayton) – A teaching assistant at the school.
- Agam (Aviv Buchler) – A girl from a well-off family living on a kibbutz. She smokes and has sexual relations despite being underage. She is Osher's girlfriend.
- Maor Zada (Dekel Elbaz) – Menachem's violent brother, who was fired from the Ashdod Port a year and a half before the start of the story. He is a drug dealer.
- Ezra Zada (Nevo Kimchi) – Menachem's widowed and abusive father, who worked at the Ashdod Port before retiring.
- Idan Amedi – Playing himself.
- Chico (Nimrod Andolet) – A hot-headed kibbutznik who uses drugs. He despises Osher and spends time with Agam.
- Hussam (Riyad Sliman) – An Arab drug dealer, Meital's partner.
- Roni (Roni Ohana) – Yaniv's girlfriend.
