= Uzi Cohen =

Israeli Likud activist and politician

- עוזי כהן

8th mayor of Ra'anana
- In office 2005–2005
- Preceded by: Ze'ev Bielski
- Succeeded by: Nahum Hofree

Personal details
- Born: 1 May 1952 Tal Shahar, Israel
- Died: 18 January 2008 (aged 55) Ra'anana, Israel
- Party: Likud

Uzi Cohen (Hebrew: עוזי כהן; 1 May 1952 – 18 January 2008) was an Israeli Likud activist and politician.

== Early life ==
Born in moshav Tal Shahar, he moved with his family to Ra'anana at the age of two. He joined the Likud at age 16.

== Political career ==
In 1990, Cohen became the deputy mayor of Ra'anana under mayor Ze'ev Bielski. After Bielski was appointed head of the Jewish Agency, Cohen became interim mayor of the city until elections were held. Cohen lost, and once again he served as deputy mayor.

Cohen was a well known public figure in Israel, due to his work with the Likud and his larger than life persona. He would often quoted in the media and boasted of his ability to "arrange jobs" for friends and acquaintances through his position within the Likud party.

He also championed the building of a canal that, according to him, would turn Ra'anana into "the Venice of the Middle East." Cohen is also famous for being spoofed on Eretz Nehederet, a prime-time satirical television show on Channel 2 Television. Controversy and claims of racism ensued after Cohen was depicted on the satirical show "Eretz Nehederet" holding a banana with gorilla mannerisms due to his dark skin coloר.

== Death ==
Cohen died of an apparent heart attack on 18 January 2008, aged 55.
