= Assi Cohen =

Israeli comedian and actor

Assi Cohen אסי כהן
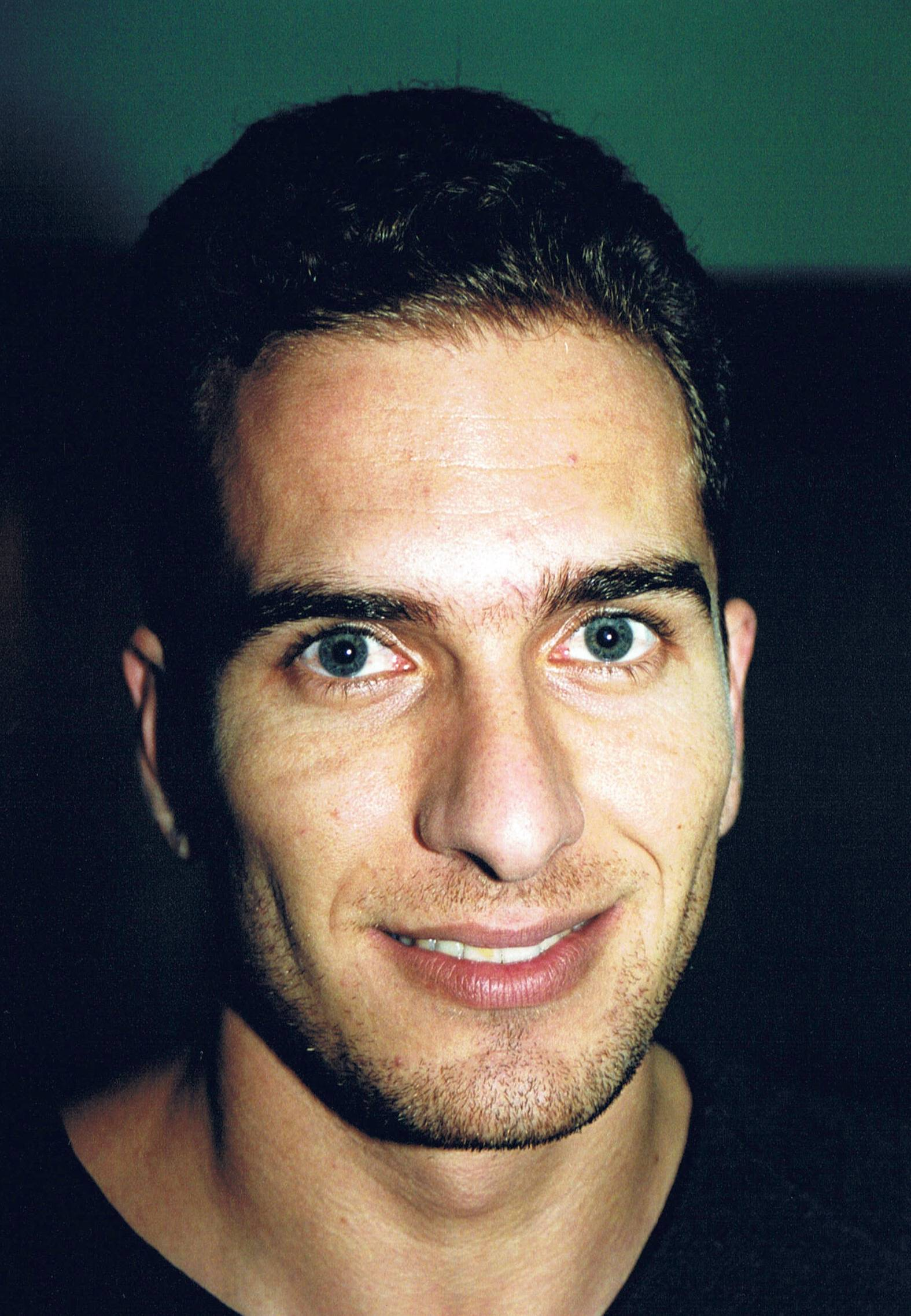
- Born: October 10, 1974 (age 52); Ashdod, Israel
- Occupation: Actor
- Spouse: Liane Feldman
- Children: 3

Assi Cohen (Hebrew: אסי כהן; born 10 October 1974) is an Israeli comedian and actor. He is best known for his appearances in the feature film Colombian Love (alongside Mili Avital), as well as for television performances in Love Hurts (alongside Dana Modan), "Rak BeYsrael" with his comedy duo of "Assi and Guri", his role in Mesudarim (US title Loaded), and for his part in Eretz Nehederet, where he has impersonated Avigdor Lieberman, Raleb Majadele, and Uri Geller among others.

In a Ynet poll conducted in May 2008, Assi Cohen was selected by respondents as the funniest Israeli for the second year in a row. He currently resides in Tel Aviv and is married with two daughters.

== Biography ==
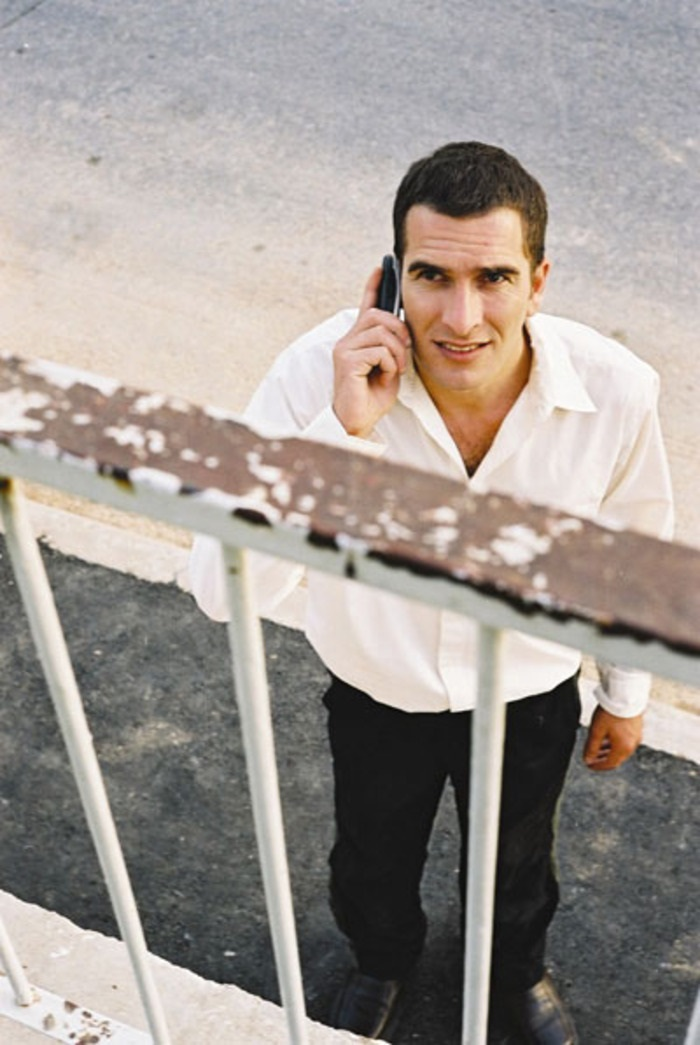
Asi Cohen in Ha-Lev Haraev (The Hungry Heart).

Cohen was born in Israel, to a Sephardic Jewish family from Turkey and Egypt, and raised and educated in the coastal city of Ashdod. During his military service he was an actor for the Israel Defense Forces' theatre, members of which are soldiers on active duty. Following his military service he worked as a stand up comic at the Domino Gross club in Tel Aviv, where he partnered with fellow comedian Guri Alfi to create the comedy duo of "Assi and Guri".

From 1999 onward he worked as a comedian and joined the TV show Domino, which aired on the commercial Channel 2 in Israel. The show, a follow-up to the highly successful Platfus, was a second television production from the Domino Gross. Participants (such as Adir Miller, Rotem Aboav, Roi Bar-Natan and Guri Alfi) were comedians who appeared regularly at the club. Assi Cohen and Guri Alfi continued to tour the country as "Assi and Guri". They created, among others, favourite characters such as David (Cohen) and Tikva (Alfi), a disgruntled married couple, and Coco (Cohen) and Steve (Alfi), a singer and keyboard player duo singing satirical songs inspired by Mizrahi music.

In 2001, alongside his duo performances, Assi played in the TV drama Star Shining above the Heart (Hebrew: כוכב זורח מעל הלב) alongside Dana Ivgi, Irit Sheleg, and Ilana Berkowitz.

In 2002 he joined the show "Rak BeYsrael" (Channel 2) (Hebrew: רק בישראל, lit. Only in Israel) alongside Guri Alfi as side-kicks to main characters "Limor" (Orna Banai) and "Shimon" (Erez Tal). That same year, he and Guri Alfi created a comedy show called "Shidurei Hamahapeha" (Channel 2) (Hebrew: שידורי המהפכה, literally The revolution's broadcasts) and participated in the controversial film Yossi & Jagger, which portrayed a homosexual relationship between a soldier (played by Yehuda Levi) and his commander (Ohad Knoller). He later participated in the comedy show "We Won't Stop Laughing" alongside Guri Alfi, Rotem Aboav, Eli Finish, and Mariano Idelman.

In 2003 he acted in the film Bonjour Monsieur Shlomi (Also: Ha-Kochavim Shel Shlomi). The same year he and Alfi broke up their comedy duo and Cohen married Lian Friedman.

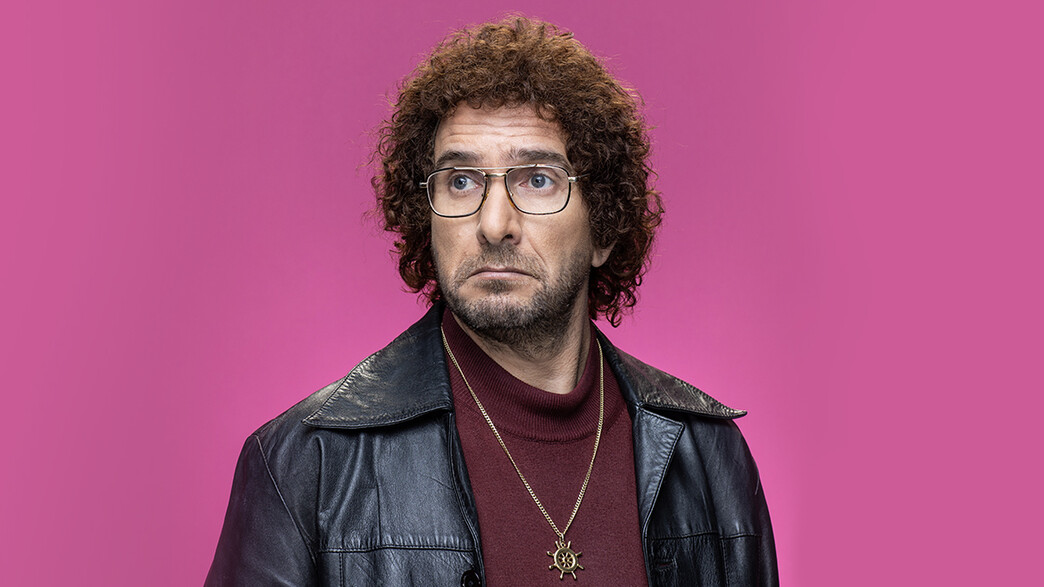
"Shauli" a character of Assi Cohen in a Eretz Nehederet

In 2004 Cohen returned to television in the comedy show Eifo Ata Chai?! (Hebrew: איפה אתה חי?!, lit. Where have you been living?!) alongside Erez Tal, Shlomo Bar-Aba, and Hadar Levi. He played several characters such as Coco the Mizrahi singer, and Himri the healer. That year he also starred in the film Colombian Love (with Mili Avital, Menashe Noi and others) as a newly married husband whose father insists he divorce his bride. Also in 2004, Cohen played alongside Dana Modan in the Israeli Emmy Award-winning television drama, Love Hurts (Hebrew: אהבה זה כואב).

In 2005 he participated in the Steven Spielberg feature film Munich, dealing with the Israeli government's secret retaliation after the 1972 Munich massacre of Israeli Olympic athletes. The film featured actors Eric Bana, Daniel Craig, and Geoffrey Rush as well as Israeli actors like Ayelet Zurer and Gila Almagor. That same year he started his participation in the Emmy Award and Golden Screen award-winning television show "Eretz Nehederet" (Hebrew: ארץ נהדרת, lit. Wonderful Country), a satirical comedy with references to current affairs and parodies of the people involved. Among his characters on the show, Cohen impersonated Illusionist Uri Geller, Football player Avi Nimni, Right-wing politician Avigdor Lieberman, and Arab Knesset member and minister Raleb Majadele. Cohen also participated that year in a short film titled "Halev HaRaev" (Hebrew: הלב הרעב, lit. The Hungry Heart) and hosted a show about What Makes an Israeli for Keshet's 57th Israeli Independence special, an 8-clip show portraying Israeli behaviors such as "wiping" hummus to eat it, feeling a bread before purchasing it, drinking of "Mud" coffee, and others.

In 2007 he participated in the entertainment television show "Mesudarim" (Channel 2) (Hebrew: מסודרים, meaning "settled [for life]" in Israeli slang), where four childhood friends sell their gaming startup company for USD$217 million, and have to deal with their newfound wealth. Chapter 9 of the show contained the first crossover in Israeli television, with the drama "BeTipul" (lit. "In Treatment"), which was later purchased by HBO; BeTipul's psychologist, played by Asi Dayan, is asked to analyze the group. The format of Mesudarim was purchased by Fox Entertainment Group and shown in the US as "Loaded". In 2009 he participated in a critically acclaimed television show "Hatufim" (Prisoners of War). The show went to be the most successful in Israel and soon after the original script of Gideon Raff was sold to Hollywood for remake which is known as "Homeland".

In 2018 he had the lead role in the dystopian drama miniseries, Autonomies.

== Filmography ==
Year	Title	Role	Notes
2002	Yossi & Jagger	Ophir	
2003	Ha-Kochavim Shel Shlomi (Bonjour Monsieur Shlom)	Sasi	
2004	Ahava Colombianit	Uri Cohen	
2004	Love Hurts (Ahava Ze Koev)	Oren	Awards of the Israeli Television Academy - Best Actor in a Drama Series
2005	Munich	Newlywed Man	
2005	Ha-Lev Haraev (The Hungry Heart)	Nissim	Short film
2009 - 2012	Prisoners of War	Amiel Ben-Horin	Nomination - Awards of the Israeli Television Academy - Best Actor in a Drama Series
2010	Zohi Sdom	Prince Ninveh	
2012 - 2014	The Parliament	Shauli/George	Awards of the Israeli Television Academy - Best Actor in a Comedy Series (2013, 2014)
2015	Dig	Shem	
2016	Tzomet Miller	Assi	
2018	Michael	Erik	
2018	Autonomies	Broide	
2018 - 2020	Kacha Ze	Neighbor	Awards of the Israeli Television Academy - Best Actor in a Comedy Series
2019	Hakol Tom	Amikam	
2026	Tell Me Everything	Meir	

== Personal life ==
Cohen is married to Lian and is the father of three daughters. They reside in Givatayim.
