= Tali Moreno =

Israeli news anchor

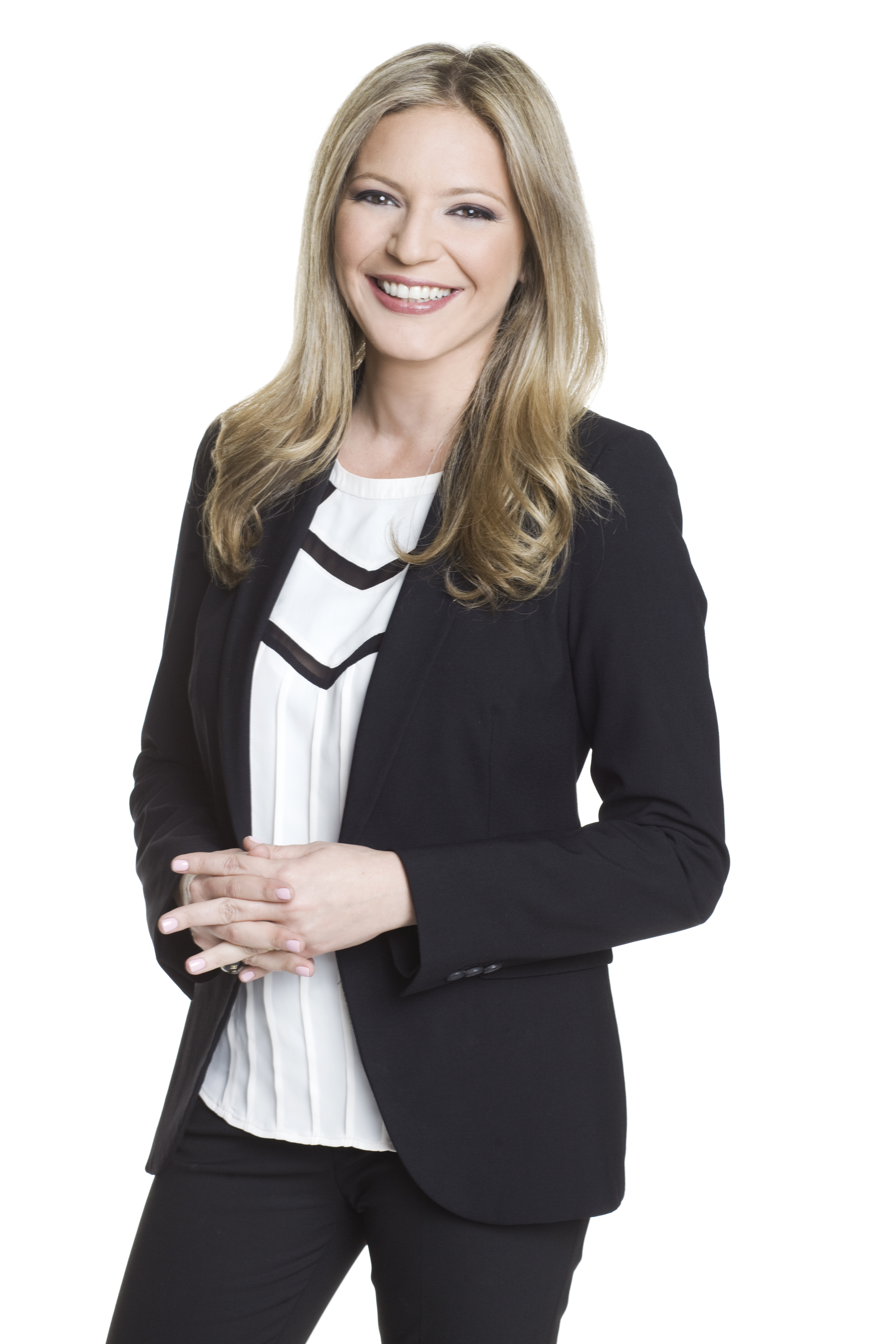
Tali Moreno, 2013

Tali Moreno (Hebrew: טלי מורנו; born 28 June 1981) is a news anchor and reporter in Kan 11 and formerly for Hadashot 13 in Israel. Moreno appears on Serves Shishi (a hosted television program) and Channel 13 News.
