= Yuval Shem-tov =

Israeli children's entertainer

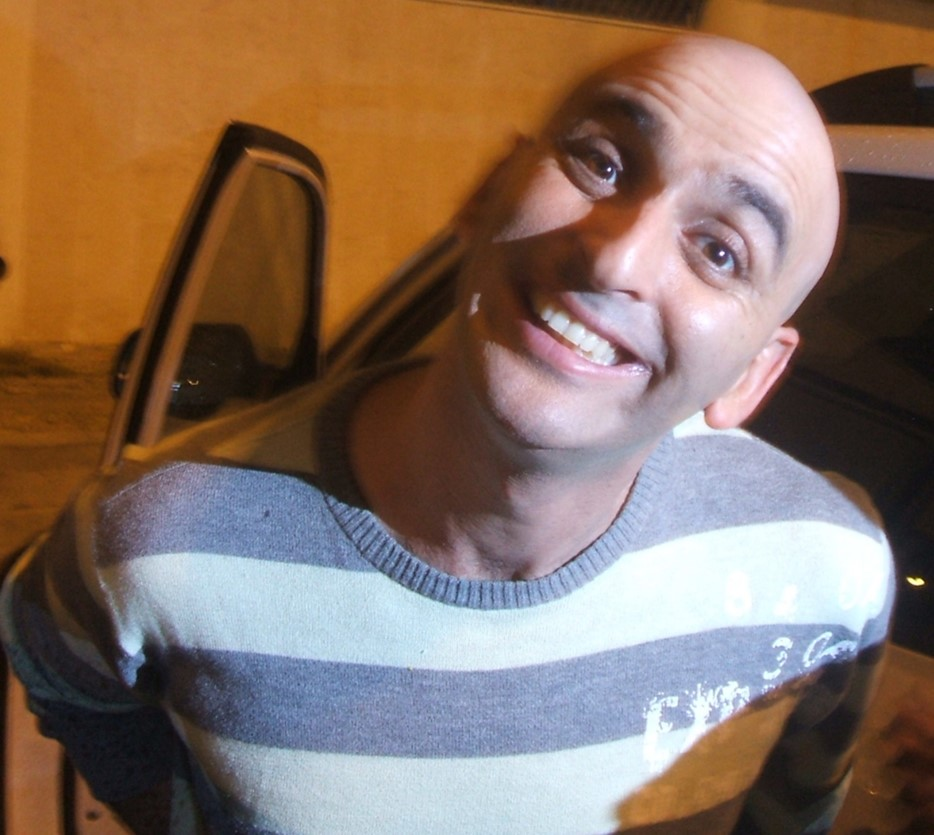
- Born: 23 June 1972 (age 54); Jerusalem, Israel
- Other name: Yuval Hamevulbal
- Occupations: Comedian, children's entertainer
- Website: yuvi.com

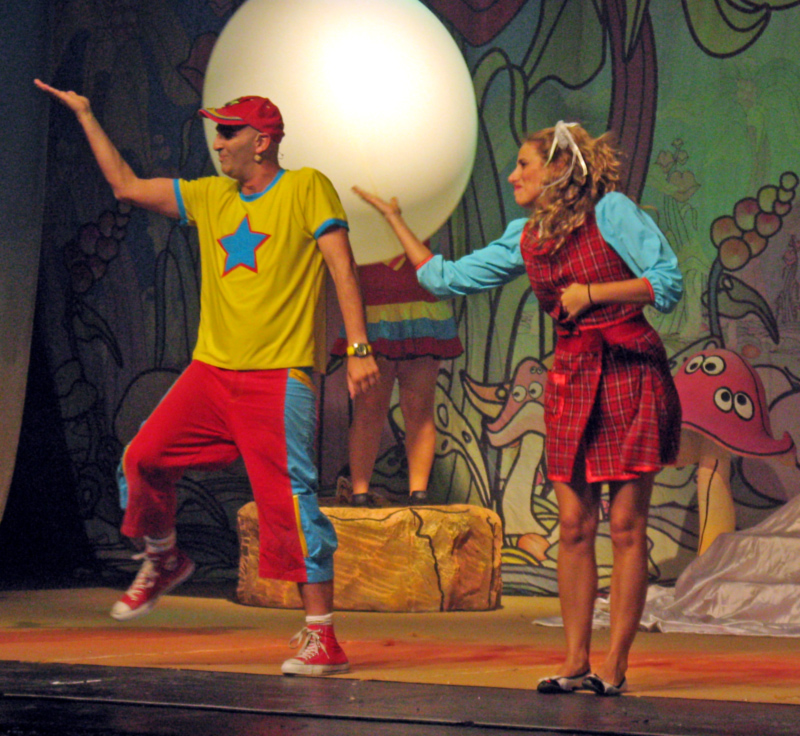
Yuval Shem-tov performing in September 2009

Yuval Shem-tov (born 23 June 1972) is an Israeli actor, comedian, and children's entertainer. He is known for his stage name that he uses, "Yuval Hamevulbal" (Yuval the Confused)

== Biography ==
Shem-tov was born in the French Hill settlement in Jerusalem to Yakov, an immigrant to Israel from Iran. He is the second of 5 children.

As a soldier in the IDF, he served as a combat officer in the Nahal "Arav" division, and later as a team commander in the Geffen Battalion in the 1st Infantry Division. During his service, he witnessed the 1994 Cave of the Patriarchs massacre, and the death of a soldier from a mortar shell hit in the security zone in southern Lebanon. He later said that these events had a traumatic effect on him for years.

He first worked with children while still in the IDF as a kindergarten teacher. In 1998, after his release from the IDF, he started performing at birthday parties under the names "Yuval HaLeitzan" (Yuval the clown) and "Yuval Hamevulbal" (Yuval the confused). In addition, he also performed as a stand-up comedian. That same year, he wrote his first song, "שלום לכם ילדים וילדות אני יובל המבולבל" (Hello boys and girls, my name is Yuval the Confused).

In July 2004, he played "שלום לכם ילדים וילדות אני יובל המבולבל" on a children's DVD of the same name, and was subsequently given his own series on the Hop! Channel for three seasons.

In 2007 he created a children's show called "יובל המבולבל – טוב לצחוק" (Yuval the Confused – It is good to laugh). The movie was released on DVD and later became available on YouTube, on which it got over 11.5 million views.

In 2018, he opened a production company called "Star Light Entertainment and Productions", with Liz Azoulay, and also participated in the documentary reality show שש אבות (Six fathers), which aired on the Israeli Channel 13.

In spring 2018, he participated in the תחרות התעלול והבלבול (Prank and Silliness competition) as part of the "Hagaddah of a festival with Kofiko and Yuval" event at the Wahl Amphitheater in Hayarkon park in Tel Aviv.

In summer 2018, he performed in his fourth film, גיבור בעננים (Hero in the clouds), as the main character. During winter of that same year, he performed in the play "The Magic of Play" by Misgav Ori Productions.

In spring 2019, he participated in the play "Hop!'s neighborhood", and in the summer performed in "The Princess and the Frog". In the winter of that year he also performed in the play "Treasure Hunt". He also appeared on the Shabbat Achim program, which aired on the Hidabrot channel, and hosted the program Koach 13 there.

== Personal life ==
In 2015, Shem-tov started observing Shabbat by not performing on Saturdays, and reported in 2015 and 2024 that he was trying to become a more observant Jew.
