= Mariano Idelman =

Israeli actor and comedian (born 1974)

- מריאנו אידלמן
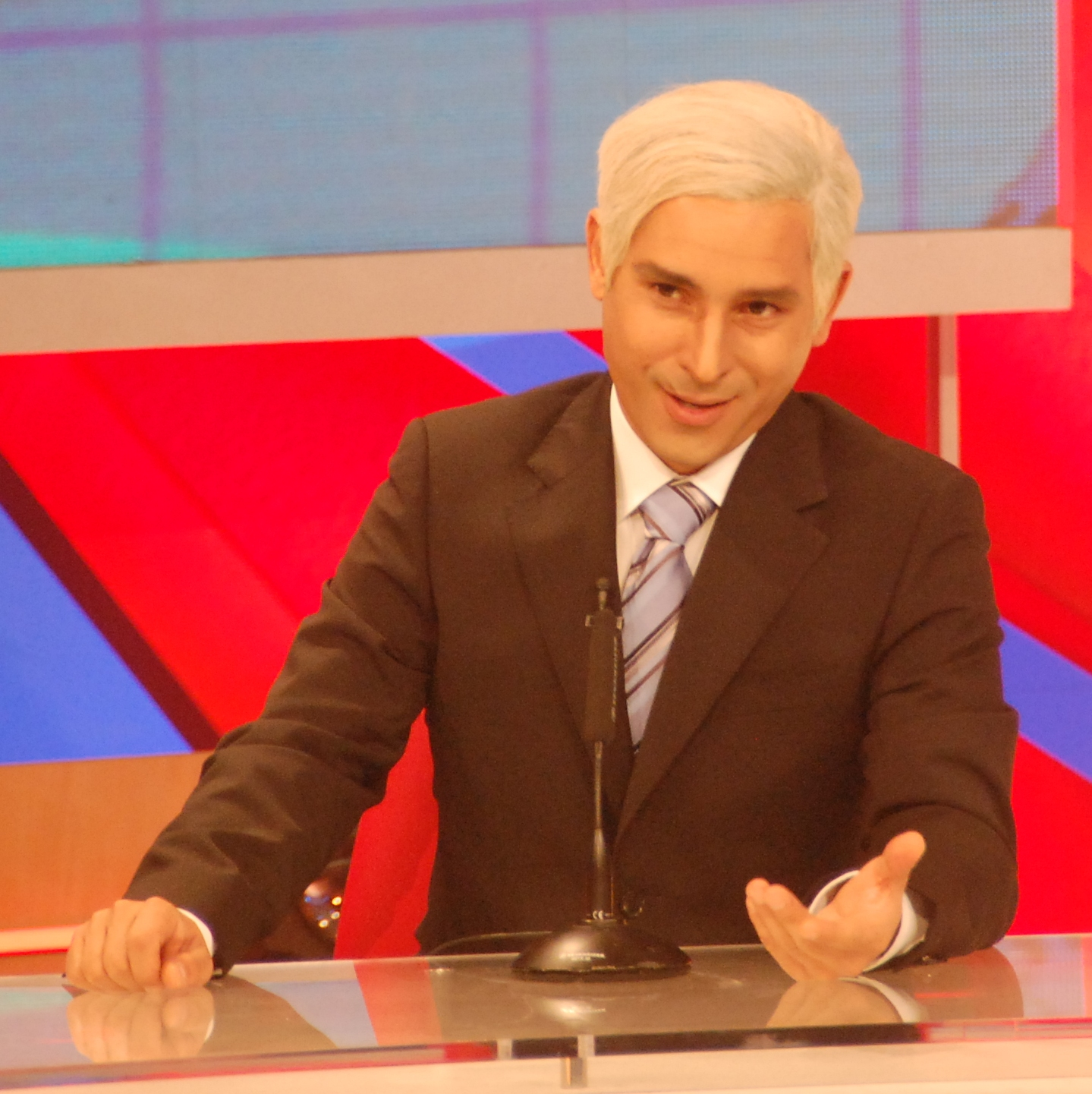
- Mariano Idelman as Benjamin Netanyahu
- Born: Mariano Idelman; 27 June 1974 (age 52); Argentina
- Citizenship: Israeli
- Occupations: Comedian; Actor

Mariano Idelman (Hebrew: מריאנו אידלמן; born 27 June 1974, Argentina) is an Argentinian-born Israeli actor and comedian. He is well known for acting in the popular TV show Eretz Nehederet.

== Career ==
In 1996 he appeared in Dudu Topaz's stand-up comedy show called The First in Entertainment with Eli Finish and signed a 2-year contract with the show.

Idelman and Finish continued working together with a stand-up act called Ovrim Al HaTzhok (a wordplay on Ovrim Al HaHok, Hebrew for "breaking the law"), and in 2001 created their own show named Ahla Seret ("A Great Movie"). In 2002 they released a 'best moments' DVD. In the same year, they appeared in a show on Bip called Lo Nafsik Litzhok ("(We) Won't Stop Laughing") along with Tal Friedman, Asi Cohen, and Rotem Abuhav. The first two continued with Idelman and Finish to Eretz Nehederet in 2003.

=== "Eretz Nehederet" ===
Idelman began his career starring in "Eretz Nehederet" in 2003, along with Eli Finish, Tal Friedman, Asi Cohen, Orna Banai, Eyal Kitzis, and others. He has parodied numerous national-level political figures, including Shimon Peres, Moshe Katzav, and Amir Peretz, and more recently, incumbent Israeli Prime Minister Benjamin Netanyahu.

=== "Arab Labor" ===
Idelman was a regular cast member in the multi-season Israeli TV situation-comedy series "Arab Labor" produced by Keshet Broadcasting in 2007, 2008 and 2012. He plays the perennially lovesick Meir, a Jewish-Israeli photojournalist and friend to the main character of the show.

== Personal life ==
Mariano is married to Ida, with whom he has three children. He has an additional daughter from his first wife. He resides in Netanya.
