= Muli Segev =

Israeli producer, actor and film director

- מולי שגב
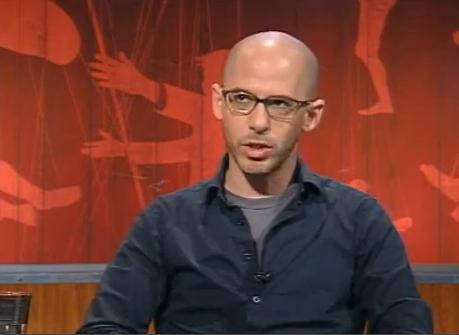
- Segev in 2011
- Born: Shmuel Cohen; 12 February 1972 (age 53); Tel Aviv, Israel
- Occupations: Television editor; producer; director; screenwriter; actor; journalist
- Years active: 1977–present
- Spouse: Shifra Cornfeld
- Children: 2
- Father: Avi Cohen
- Relatives: Michael Cohen (half-brother)

Muli Segev (Note: "Muli" is a diminutive of Shmuel (Samuel) and "segev" as an epithet with Biblical associations) (Hebrew: מולי שגב; born Shmuel Cohen) is an Israeli TV editor, producer, director and screenwriter, and in the past an actor and a journalist.

== Personal ==
Son of Avi Cohen, half-brother of musician Michael Cohen, married to TV personality, author and screenwriter Shifra Cornfeld.

== Filmography ==
- 2023: Hebrew: הצ'ופצ'יק של הקומקום: החיים על פי הגשש החיוור (an episode from the series about HaGashash HaHiver), participant
- 2010: Zohi Sdom ("This is Sodom", comedy feature film), co-director, co-screenwriter and co-producer
- Ima'lle, comedy series, co-creator with Tamar Maron (תמר מרום) and Ram Nehari (רם נהרי)
- 2007-2009" Mesudarim ("settled [for life]", comedy drama TV series), creator
  - British adaptation: Loaded
- 2003–present: Eretz Nehederet ("It's a Wonderful Land", TV comedy show), creator
- 1983-1986: Krovim Krovim ("Close Relatives", TV sitcom), child actor
- 1977: Rega im Dodley (TV program for children), child actor

== Awards ==
- Eretz Nehederet was multiple Israeli Academy of Film and Television Awards winner in the category of Satire and Sketches Programs
  - 2022: Awards in four categories, including the Best Screenplay Award for an Entertainment, Satire and Sketches program.
- Zohi Sdom won two Ophir Awards for Best Art Direction, and Best Costume Design
