= Yuval Semo =

Israeli actor and comedian (born 1969)

- יובל סמו
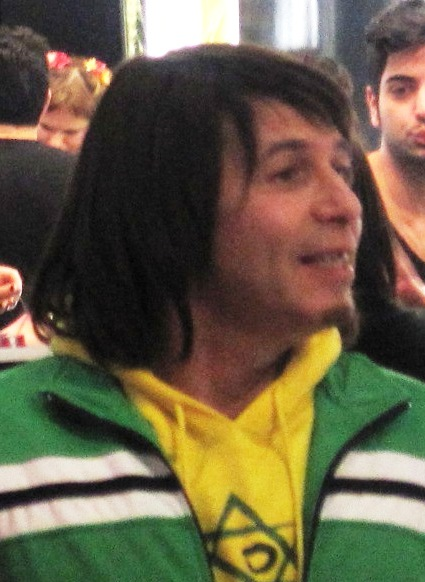
- Born: 20 June 1969 (age 56); Haifa, Israel
- Citizenship: Israeli
- Occupations: Actor; comedian
- Spouse: Dana Avraham-Samo
- Children: 3

Yuval Semo (Hebrew: יובל סמו; born 20 June 1969) is an Israeli actor and comedian. He became well known for his roles in the popular Israeli TV show, Eretz Nehederet and later for Zanzouri and Hashoter Hatov (The Good Cop).

== Biography ==
Yuval Semo was born in Haifa in 1969. His military service was in the Ordnance Corps, after which he worked at a variety of occupations for a variety of employers including the Israel Electric Corporation, L'Oréal, a garage, catering, newspaper delivery and construction. During this period, Semo attended the acting school, "Beit Zvi".

He began his acting career as part of the "Prozac Trio" (שלישיית פרוזאק) with whom he participated in many Israeli TV shows such as "Eretz Nehederet", "Ha-Retzu'a","Ha-Chaim Ze Lo Hacol", "Shidurey HaMahapecha", "Domino", "Naor's Friends" and "HaPijamot".

From 2001–3 Semo played in the Tzavta theater (succeeding Hanan Lederman). He also played secondary roles in several Israeli films such as "Bekarov, Yikre Lekha Mashehu Tov", "Yossi and Jagger" and "Zohi Sdome".

In 2007 he joined the cast of the Israeli television show "Eretz Nehederet" (Hebrew: ארץ נהדרת, lit. Wonderful Country), a satirical comedy about current affairs. Among the characters whom Semo memorably parodied were political commentator Ehud Yaari, musician Moshe Ben-Ari, politician Isaac Herzog, Hezbollah leader Hassan Nasrallah, Israel Minister of Justice Daniel Friedmann, Israel Attorney General Menachem Mazuz, Israeli politician Uri Orbach and the Queen of the United Kingdom.

In 2010 Semo played in the Israeli film Zohi Sdome (Hebrew: זוהי סדום, lit. "This is Sodom") together with the rest of the "Eretz Nehederet" cast.

Semo is married to actress Dana (nee Abraham) Semo. The couple have a son, Ran Semo.

== Filmography ==
- Yossi & Jagger (2002)
- Bekarov, Yikre Lekha Mashehu Tov (2006)
- Hapijamot (2006)
- Monsters vs. Aliens (Hebrew Dub) (2009)
- Zohi Sdome (2010)
- Zanzouri (2012)
- haShoter haTov (TV series) (2015)
- Aba Metapelet (2020)
- One Day in October (2024)

== Personal life ==
Semo is married to the actress Dana Avraham-Samo, and the couple has three children. The couple resides in Givatayim.
