= Eli Finish =

Israeli actor and comedian

- אלי פיניש
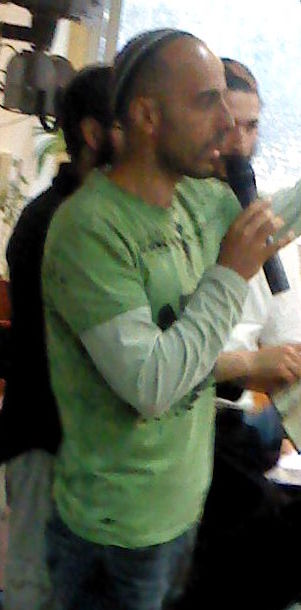
- Born: 17 June 1975 (age 50); Netanya, Israel
- Occupations: Actor; stand-up comedian; impressionist
- Years active: 1996–present
- Children: 2

Eli Finish (Hebrew: אלי פיניש; born 17 June 1975) is an Israeli actor, stand-up comedian and impressionist. He is well known for acting in the popular TV show Eretz Nehederet.

== Career ==
After his release from the IDF in 1996, Finish studied acting in the art school HaBustan in Netanya. He also appeared in Dudu Topaz's stand-up comedy show called The First in Entertainment with Mariano Idelman in the same year, and signed a 2-year contract with the show.

Finish and Idelman continued working together with a stand-up act called Ovrim Al HaTzhok (a word play on Ovrim Al HaHok, Hebrew for "breaking the law"), and in 2001 created their own show named Ahla Seret ("A Great Movie"). In 2002 they released a 'best moments' DVD. In the same year, they appeared in a show on Bip called Lo Nafsik Litzhok ("(We) Won't Stop Laughing") along with Tal Friedman, Asi Cohen and Rotem Abuhav. The first two continued with Finish and Idelman to Eretz Nehederet in 2003.

In 2005, Finish played his first non-comic character in the TV series Hadar Milhama ("War Room"), and continued as an actor in the show Lo Hivtahti Lakh ("I Didn't Promise You") in 2006.

=== Eretz Nehederet ===
Eli Finish began his career starring in Eretz Nehederet in 2003, along with Mariano Idelman, Tal Friedman, Asi Cohen, Orna Banai, Eyal Kitzis, etc. He has parodied numerous real-life persons, including Shimon Peres, Moshe Katzav and Amir Peretz.

== Personal life ==
Finish was married to Lital (Lulik) Gat, and they have one son together. He later had a two-year relationship with actress Dana Frieder.

In 2017, he got engaged to his partner, surfing instructor Sheli Lavi. They married on October 6, 2017. On July 2, 2018 they had a daughter together. In August 2020 they separated.

Finish resides in Netanya. In February 2023 his house was destroyed in a fire.
