= Dov Navon =

Israeli comedian and actor (born 1959)

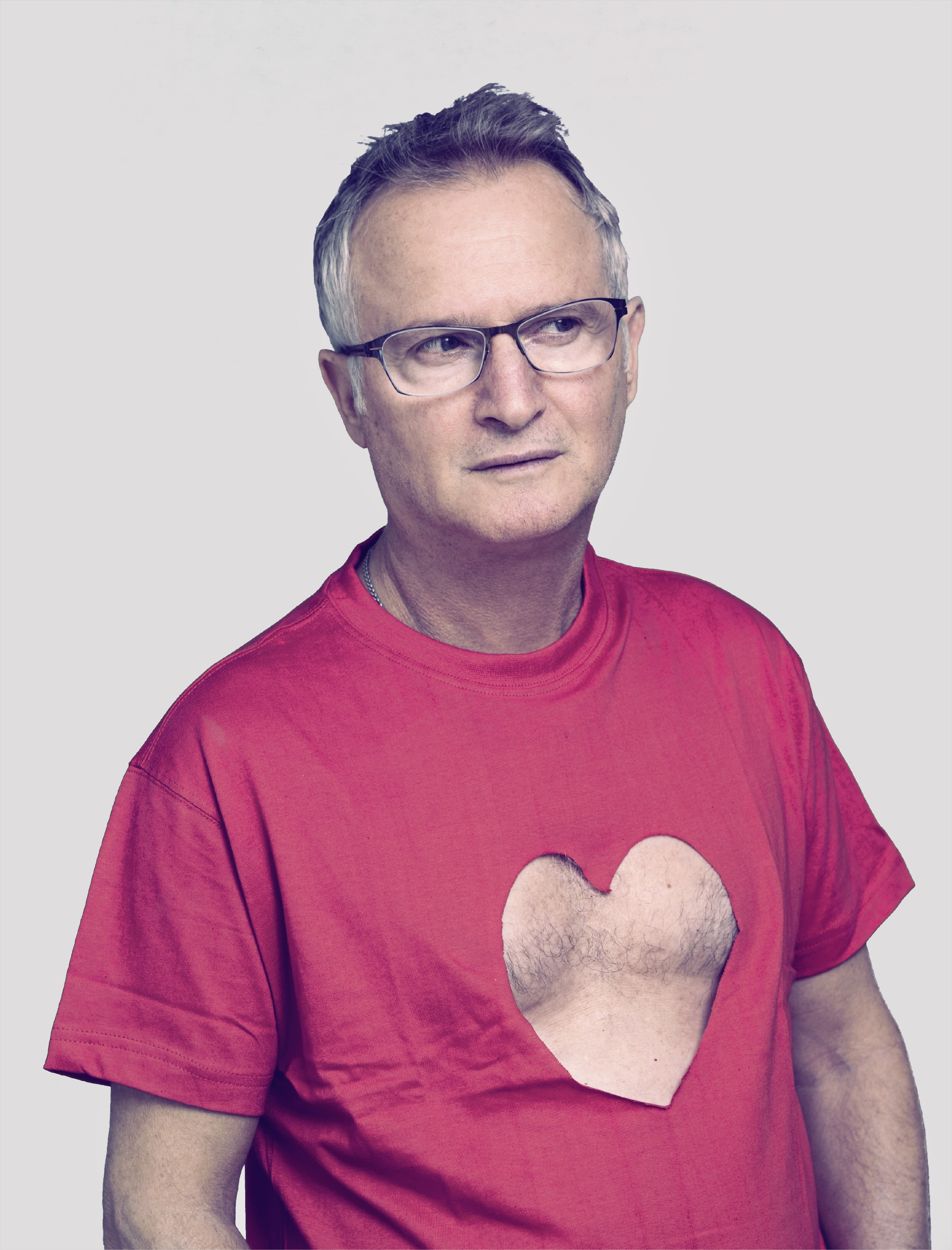
Dov Navon

Dov Navon (Hebrew: דב נבון) (born June 15, 1959) is an Israeli comedian, film, TV, and stage actor, and TV host.

== Awards ==
- 1996: Israeli Theatre Award for best supporting actor in Shmuel Hasfari's play, Shiva.
- 2002: Israeli Golden Screen Award
- 2022, 2024: Israeli Television Academy Award
