= Keshet Media Group =

Israeli mass media company

- Logo of Keshet International division

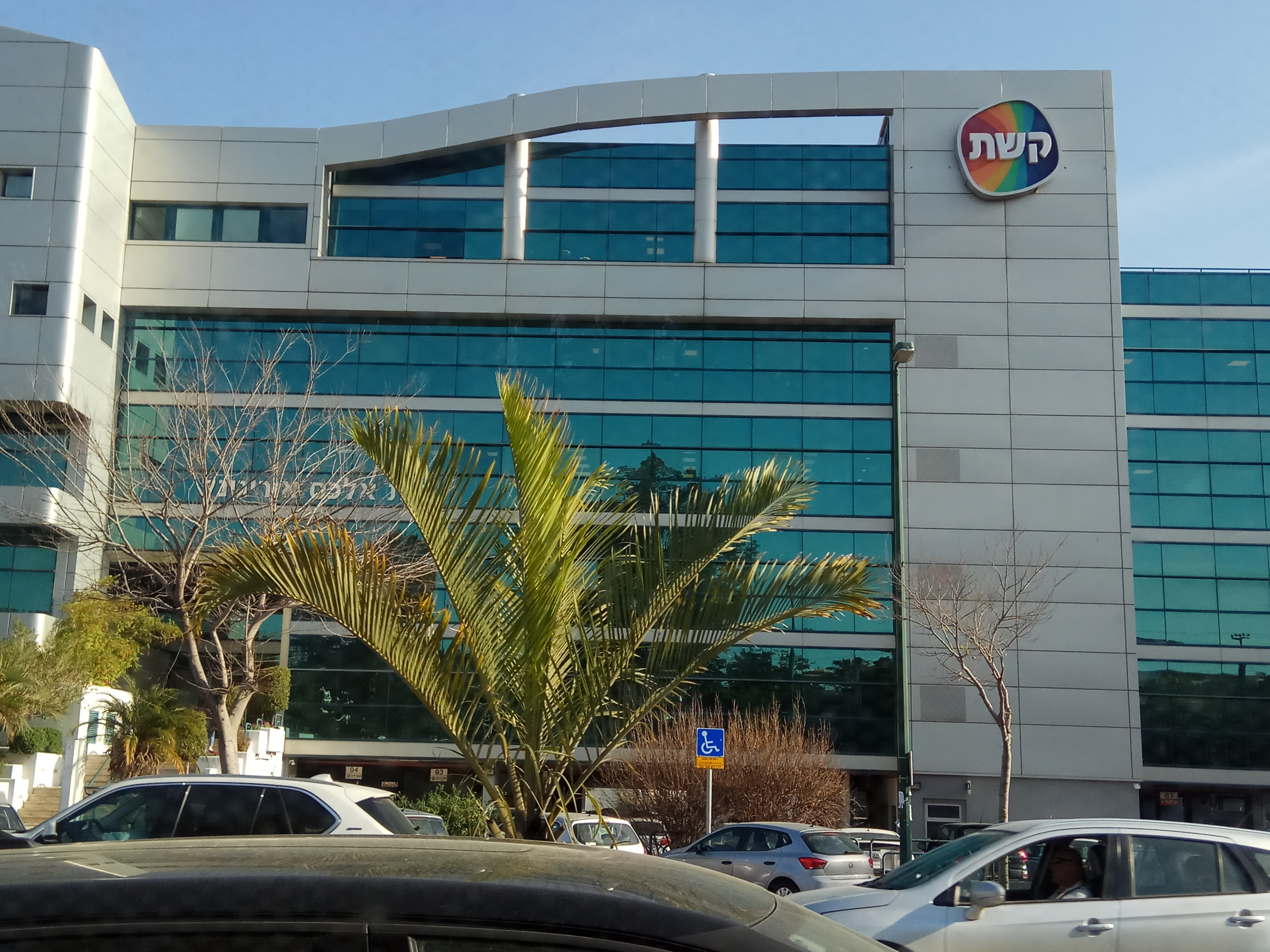
- Native name: שידורי קשת
- Type: Private
- Industry: Media
- Founded: 1993; 33 years ago
- Headquarters: Tel Aviv, Israel
- Key people: Avi Nir (CEO)
- Products: Television broadcasting; Cable television; Satellite television; Web portal
- Number of employees: 500
- Divisions: Keshet International; Keshet Broadcasting; Mako
- Website: Official website

Keshet Media Group, also known as the Keshet Company (Hebrew: קשת, lit. 'Rainbow'), is an Israeli private mass media company headquartered in Tel Aviv. Its media and online news outlet Mako is one of the major Israeli ones.

The company has operated Keshet Broadcasting, a television broadcast operator and a franchisee of Israel's Channel 2, from 1993 until November 2017. Since November 2017's licensing reform, it was rebranded in Israel as Keshet 12, a separate channel.

Keshet shows original drama series, entertainment, current affairs, lifestyle shows, and foreign programs. Keshet's global production and distribution arm is Keshet International, and the company's digital branch is Mako, one of the top three most-visited websites in Israel.

Keshet was established in 1993 and is one of Israel's largest media companies. Avi Nir has been the chief executive officer of Keshet since 2002. Keshet is responsible for shows including Prisoners of War (Hatufim), Rising Star (HaKokhav HaBa) and When Heroes Fly.

== History ==
Keshet was founded in 1993 when Israel's Channel 2 was formed along with two other operators, Telad and Reshet. The company was started by Alex Gilady, the current president of Keshet and a former vice president at NBC International in London.

The first drama series Keshet produced was in 1996 called Bat Yam, New York. That same year, Channel 2 became the most watched channel in Israel. What a Wonderful Country (Eretz Nehederet), a TV series similar to Saturday Night Live, aired its first season in 2003 and has since become one of the most popular shows on Israeli TV.

In 2005, a committee formed by the Second Israeli Broadcasting Authority selected two of the three operators to run the next phase of Channel 2, one of only two channels allowed to run commercials. Keshet came first and was awarded four broadcasting days per week. The other two days were awarded to Reshet. That same year, Keshet purchased the rights to Uvda, an investigative and current affairs program hosted by Ilana Dayan. The show was originally launched in 1993 and has been the only continuously running program since the launch of commercial television in Israel.

In 2007, Keshet launched the Israeli version of Big Brother called HaAh HaGadol. It became the most-watched television show of the year and remains one of the highest-rated shows in Israel. In 2010, Keshet launched Prisoners of War (Hatufim), which was also sold to Showtime and developed into Homeland a year later with Keshet as an executive producer.

Keshet also runs the Israeli Music 24, Netex New Media, a Hebrew-language website directory, and the comedy outlet Bip, all integrated under news and entertainment portal, mako.

In 2012, Keshet Media Group Avi Nir launched and hosted the inaugural Innovation in Television (INTV) confab, a two-day conference in Jerusalem that has featured a stellar line up of the most prominent industry leaders, creators, executives and thinkers over the course of the six events to date. The seventh edition is scheduled for March 2021.

== Divisions and subsidiaries ==
=== Keshet International ===
Keshet has been selling formats under Keshet Formats since 2000. In 2012, Keshet International was established as the global production and distribution branch of Keshet Media Group. It has operations in the United Kingdom, Keshet Productions and Greenbird; Hong Kong, Keshet Asia; the United States, Keshet Studios; and Germany, Tresor; and Keshet Tresor Fiction.

=== Mako ===
Mako (Hebrew: מאקו) is an Israeli news and entertainment portal owned and operated by Keshet which offers video on-demand content from Keshet shows, Channel 2 news programs, Bip (Comedy Channel) and Music 24 (Israeli Music Channel). In addition, it hosts user-created content in Haambatia, and provides written content covering news, entertainment, sports, music, TV, food, comedy, "Home & Family", "Digital", "Spirit" and "Women and Men".

=== Keshet 12 ===
Originally Keshet Broadcasting was one of two operators that ran the main Israeli commercial television channel, Channel 2, from 1993 to 2017 until the Channel 2 split.

In November 2017, Channel 2 closed down, while Keshet Broadcasting is rebranded and relaunched as Keshet 12, a new TV channel broadcasting 24/7, unlike Channel 2, which broadcast Keshet content for a few days per week.

== Notable productions ==
=== Television ===
- Big Brother (season 1–8) – Keshet and Kuperman productions aired the Israeli version of Big Brother ten years after the show debuted on worldwide TV. The show became a phenomenon, topping the charts for 16 weeks in a row and averaging a 31% share of ratings. Keshet also aired a celebrity Big Brother VIP season 1 & 2.
- Polishuk – An Israeli version of The Thick Of It, first aired in 2009. Scripted and directed by the playwright Shmuel Hasfari, the show tells the story of a politically clueless man (Rubi Polishuck, played by Academy Award winner Sasson Gabai), who entered politics almost by accident, but becomes the minister of Social Services when a scandal in his party forces the resignation of the previous minister.
- Hatufim – A drama about two POW who are released from prison in Lebanon and have to find their way back into society and a normal life while accepting all the changes that have happened in the lives of their loved ones. Directed by Gidi Raff and sold to Fox, it has been adapted into Homeland for Showtime in the United States.
- Ramzor (Hebrew for "Stoplight") – A sitcom starring, and written by, Adir Miller and Asaf Sarig dealing with relationship issues from the point of view of three men, each in a different phase of relationship from single (green), to a steady relationship (yellow), to married (red). Each gives a different comedic interpretation of the terms of relationships between men and women.
- The Ex – A drama about a young lady who is told by a fortune teller that she must find true love by the end of the year or she will never get married, and that it will be with one of her ex-boyfriends. Keshet sold the copyrights to CBS in 2008 and they created an American version, The Ex List (starring Amanda Peet and Zach Braff).
- Eretz Nehederet – The most successful Israeli satire show, shown by Keshet for seventeen seasons. The show has great effect on politicians and on public discussions of politics, with headlines regarding it often appearing in the news section rather than the entertainment section. It often makes reference to social conflicts between different Israeli political groups.
- Uvda (Hebrew for "Fact") – The Israeli equivalent of 60 Minutes, giving audiences a much deeper and more thorough look behind closed doors than they had before. The show has caused the resignation of the Israeli Chief of Police, revealed illegal transactions between the military industry and foreign countries and, on several occasions, caused establishment of special government committees to investigate subjects it brought to the attention of the public. Keshet broadcast the show's sixteenth season in December 2009.
- Pilpelim Tzehubim (Hebrew for "Yellow Peppers") – A drama series that follows a family whose youngest child gets diagnosed with autism. The show is produced by Fifty Fathoms Productions, Tiger Aspect Productions and Keshet U.K.
- Avoda Aravit (Hebrew for "Arab Labor") – A sitcom following the life of an Israeli Arab journalist. The series was the first mainstream Israeli skein to feature predominantly Arabic characters and dialogue (70% of the series's dialogue is in Arabic shown with Hebrew subtitles).
- Sabri Maranan (Aramaic for "Listen Everyone") – A family sitcom produced by Tedy Productions for Keshet Broadcasting which has been picked up by TBS in the United States and Alpha TV in Greece.
- Beit Sefer le Musica (Hebrew for "Music School") – A talent show series adaptation based on the Masterclass show on HBO. The Israeli series features children participating in singing competitions that are mentored by teachers and given "homework," "grades" and "challenges" to complete throughout the season.
- Boom! – A game show which has had various international adaptations.
- 2025 – A reality TV series which debuted on 10 February 2019, with the format being that a group of people are locked inside a fictional city and are given 12,000 NIS each, which is used to pay for good and services; the money is also used to rank the contestants, with the contestant with the lowest amount each week being eliminated from the show.

=== Cinema ===
Keshet has also invested in the production of various films in the Israeli cinema industry over the past two decades. Keshet financed films including The Band's Visit, Lebanon, Dancing in Jaffa, and Gett: The Trial of Viviane Amsalem by Shlomi and Ronit Elkabetz, which was nominated for a Golden Globe in 2015. Other films Keshet has financed include:

- Yossi & Jagger
- This Is Sodom (Zohi Sdom)
- Adam Resurrected
- Eyes Wide Open
- The Assassin Next Door
- Jaffa
- Sweet Mud
- Late Marriage

== See also ==
- Television in Israel
- Culture of Israel
- Keshet International
