= Channel 2 (Israel) =

Defunct Israeli television channel

Israeli TV Channel 2
- Country: Israel
- Broadcast area: National
- Headquarters: Jerusalem

Programming
- Language: Hebrew
- Picture format: 16:9 (576i, SDTV)

Ownership
- Owner: The Second Authority for Television and Radio

History
- Launched: 23 October 1986 (experimental transmissions); 4 November 1993 (official launch)
- Closed: 1 November 2017 (split into 2 channels)
- Replaced by: Keshet 12: Reshet 13; Israeli News Company

Links
- Website: Channel 2

Channel 2 (Hebrew: ערוץ שתיים, romanized: Arutz Shtaim), also called "The Second Channel" (Hebrew: הערוץ השני, romanized: HaArutz HaSheni) was an Israeli commercial television channel. It started doing experimental broadcasts funded through a television licence tax. The channel started commercial broadcasting on 4 November 1993 regulated and managed by the Second Authority for Television and Radio. In its first years, the channel was operated by three broadcasters (Keshet, Reshet, and Telad), and in 2005 only two broadcasters were left while Telad stopped broadcasting due to its loss in the Second Authority's auction.

On 31 October 2017, 24 years after the channel started broadcasting, it was closed and split into two new channels: Keshet 12 and Reshet 13. The News Company that was founded alongside the channel continued to broadcast news to both of the channels in parallel despite the split, but a few months after, following a merger between the Reshet 13 and Arutz 10 channels, Reshet adopted Arutz 10's news company's broadcast, and the News Company started broadcasting exclusively on Keshet 12.

== History ==
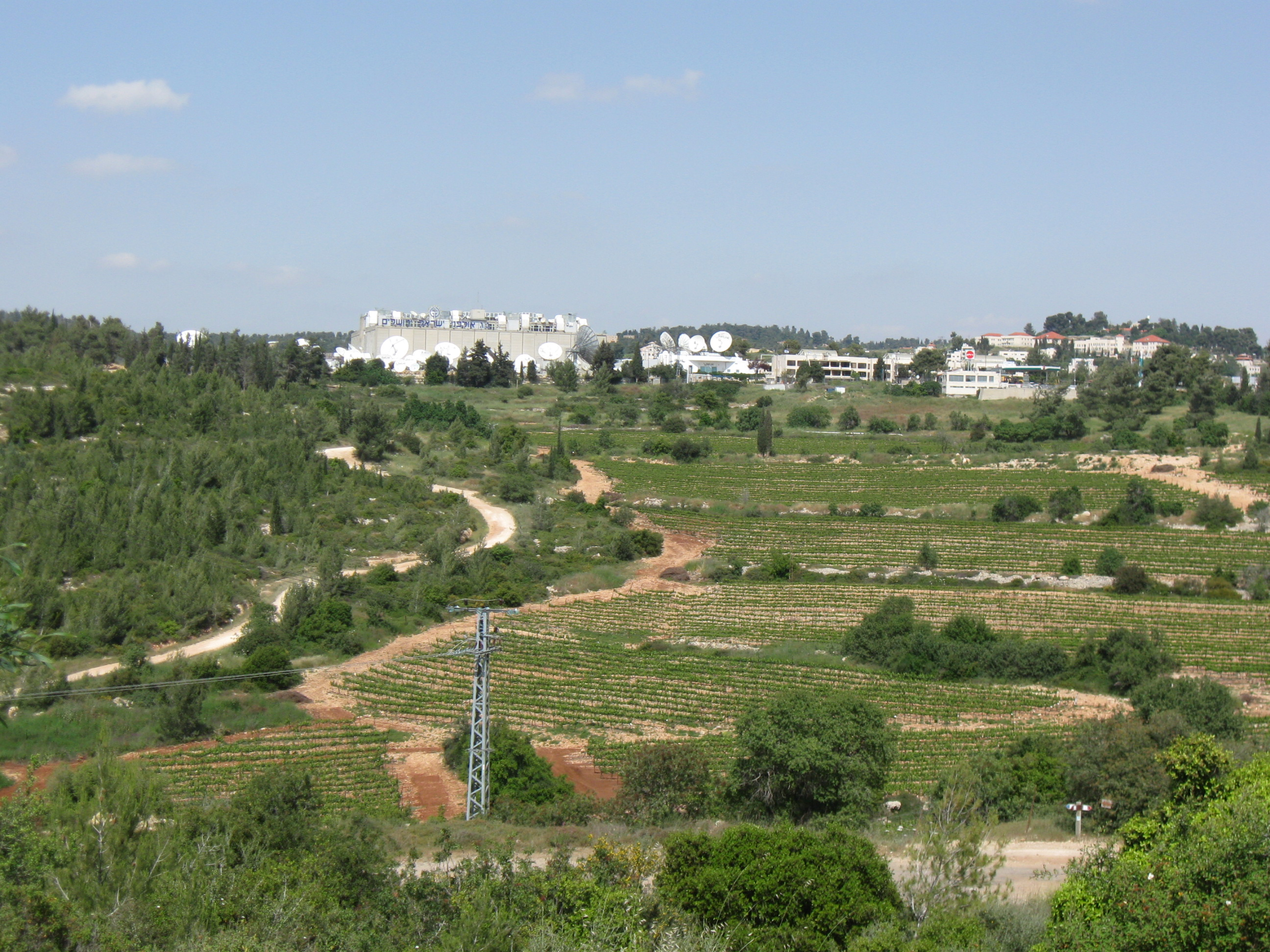
Israeli News Company studios in Neve Ilan

The idea of a second television channel in Israel was first mooted in 1978 when the Israeli government set up a special committee headed by Haim Kovarsky to explore the establishment of a second channel that would not be under the supervision of the Israel Broadcasting Authority (IBA) and would be financed by advertising, however the idea of commercial television was rejected by the National Religious Party (NRP), which was part of the ruling coalition at that time. On 23 October 1986, Amnon Rubinstein, the then Minister of Communications, ordered the start of "experimental transmissions" on a second channel, claiming that unless these transmissions had started, the frequencies would have been used by TV networks in neighbouring countries. The first transmissions were aired on UHF channel 21 from Mount Eitanim transmission tower situated on the hills west of Jerusalem. These transmissions, which initially included 2–3 hours of video clips every evening originating from a private TV studio in Jerusalem, expanded gradually to include a full program lineup. At that time the IBA was legally responsible for the channel, but it actually saw it as unexpected competition, tried to prevent its inauguration, and was reluctant to take responsibility for its broadcasts.

In 1986 the Knesset started discussing the law forming the Second Israeli Broadcasting Authority, and in 1990, the Knesset passed a law that paved the way for the establishment of commercial television in Israel. The goal was to enhance pluralism and create competition. Channel 2 began broadcasting on 4 November 1993. Three concessionaires were chosen: Keshet, Telad and Reshet. The concessionaires received a broadcasting contract for one decade and worked out a rotation agreement amongst themselves. The channel broadcast from UHF channel 22 in Mount Eitanim serving Jerusalem; additional relay stations elsewhere in Israel included channel 27 in Acco and channel 36 in Be'er Sheba.

In 2005, the Ministry of Communications announced that two concessionaires would receive broadcasting contracts for the following decade. Of the four competitors – the three existing concessionaries, and a new operator called Kan (unrelated to the Israeli Public Broadcasting Corporation, which would only be established 12 years afterwards) – Keshet and Reshet were chosen. Telad, which lost the bid, stopped broadcasting on Channel 2 in October 2005. Keshet and Reshet broadcast 4 days a week, rotating every two years. In 2011, Channel 2 installed a new digital system to preserve news content that was stored on aging videotapes and manage its archive library.

== Experimental broadcasts ==
Channel 2 started its experimental broadcasts in September 1986. Until that time, Channel 1 was the only channel broadcasting in Israel. When the broadcasting started, a test card was shown and in October of the same year the channel started showing photographs of Israel's landscapes and instructions on how to receive the transmissions. On 23 October 1986, Channel 2 started broadcasting music videos. This is considered the beginning of the Experimental Channel 2's broadcasts. In its first months, the broadcasts were two-three hours long. In February 1987, the Demjanjuk trial was broadcast in Channel 2. In the same year's independence day, the experimental channel did a live news broadcast during the entire holiday.

In 1987, there was a labor strike in the IBA and Channel 1 did not broadcast for a period of 52 days. During the strike, Channel 2 got a permission to expand its broadcasting hours and to broadcast movies and various imported TV shows. Later, the government let Channel 2 broadcast in Channel 1's frequencies. This was deemed as an attempt from the government to stop the strike. During the strike, Ida Nudel arrived in Israel and the experimental channel was directed to live broadcast her welcoming ceremony. With the end of the strike, the IBA stopped working with Channel 2 and Channel 2 stopped airing its special productions. In 1990, the Knesset passed the Second Israeli Broadcasting Authority law and Channel 2 officially became an independent channel.

== Commercial broadcasting ==
The first tender, in May 1992, was attended by three companies: Keshet, Reshet, and Telad. No group participated in the second tender, which closed in September 1992, after their request for a relaxation of the tender conditions was not granted. The main reason for the failure of the previous tenders lay in the question of cross-ownership between owners of various media outlets. Some argued that participation in the tender by interested parties in other media outlets, such as the printed press and cable companies that were already operating at the time, should be prevented or significantly limited. The last tender published by the Second Authority included certain control restrictions on media owners but allowed their participation in the tender. Thus, the owners of Yedioth Ahronoth, who held shares in the Arutzi Zehav cable company, were among the shareholders of Reshet, while the owners of the Maariv newspaper, who held shares in the Matav cable company, were among the shareholders of Telad.

Out of 7 companies that took part in the tender from 31 March, 3 companies (and their respective initial broadcasting days, decided in June) were chosen on 24 May 1993:

- Reshet: Sundays, Wednesdays and Saturdays
- Telad: Mondays and Thursdays
- Keshet: Tuesdays and Fridays

At the same time, the News Company was established, which was jointly owned and funded by the franchisees.

On 4 November 1993, Channel 2 started broadcasting as a commercial channel that is not funded by a TV tax and aired commercials. The news company opened the broadcast with a short news briefing with Ya'akov Eilon. The three franchisees got a contract for six years and later, it was extended to another six years. The channel became quickly the most watched channel in Israel.

=== Second bid ===
In 2005, 12 years after Channel 2 started broadcasting, the Second Authority did another bid for only two franchisees. All three existing franchisees of Channel 2 applied for the bid and also Kan Group which was founded for this bid and did not broadcast before. Noga Communications applied for the bid first as an independent franchisee but then applied along with Reshet under the name Reshet-Noga. On 13 April, Keshet and Reshet won the bid. In November 2005, Telad stopped its broadcasting on Channel 2 and the broadcasting week was filled by Keshet and Reshet broadcasting.

=== Switching to widescreen and HD broadcasting ===
Since the end of 2012, Channel 2's franchisees started gradually changing their content to widescreen format and during 2013, Keshet started broadcasting in 16:9 aspect ratio and Reshet followed on later. Since 2014, most of both franchisees' contents were broadcast in 16:9 although the News Company kept broadcasting in 4:3, as well as old programs' reruns.

In 2010, Reshet asked the Second Authority for HD broadcasting. The request was turned down because all commercial channels had to go through the Second Authorities' systems and they did not work with HD broadcasts. Both of the franchisees did not broadcast in HD before Channel 2's closure, although by that time, most of their productions were shot in HD and were available to watch in HD on video on demand and the internet.

As a part of Channel 2's splitting in November 2017, Keshet and Reshet moved to broadcast in separate channels and one of the requirements to broadcast was that the broadcaster had to broadcast in HD quality.

== Channel 2's splitting ==
In 2014, a bill to split Channel 2 and to end the franchise period in April 2015 was suggested and the broadcasters will broadcast in separate channels. Keshet and Reshet declared that they prefer to keep broadcasting in Channel 2 until 2017. Eventually, the bill did not pass.

On 26 April 2017, Keshet and Reshet declared that from November 2017 Keshet will broadcast in Channel 12, Reshet will broadcast in Channel 13 and Channel 22 will not be used for four months after the split.

On 31 October 2017, from 21:30 to midnight, Keshet did a broadcast to conclude Channel 2's broadcasts. The broadcast was conducted by Erez Tal and many of Keshet's talents participated in it. A broadcasting hour was given to Reshet to say goodbye to Channel 2.

Before the split, the franchisees started promoting the new channels with their programs. Since the law that splits the channel, the franchisees started showing their logos in the bottom left corner of their broadcasts.

The news company kept existing under the ownership of both franchisees until January 2019, when Reshet and Channel 10 merged. Most of the news company's contents were broadcast in parallel on both channels except for the commercial breaks and the weather forecast's sponsorship ads. During the news company's broadcasts, the news company's logo was shown under the channel's logo.

In order for Reshet and Channel 10 to merge, Reshet sold its share in the news company to Keshet.

=== Effect of Channel 2's splitting on Channel 10 and 33 ===
==== Channel 10 ====
In addition to Channel 2's splitting, Channel 10 has also moved to a different channel. Channel 10 won channel 14 in the bid for a price of one Shekel and 54 Agorot. The channel crowdfunded the purchase in a Headstart project.

On 19 September 2017, due to Channel 2's splitting and the move to channel 14, the channel rebranded to a verbal branding - "עשר (ten)" - instead of the old channel's numerical branding. Less than one year after the split, Reshet and Channel 10's shareholders decided to merge; the merger became effective in January 2019.

Following the merger, the 14 channel number remained unused until late 2021, when Channel 20 moved to it.

==== Makan 33 ====
Although there is no connection between the commercial channels to IPBC's channels, Channel 2's split might affect the viewing habits of Israel's Arab citizens. In October 2017, the Second Authority decided to transfer Makan 33 to the second array of Idan+ (DVB-T2) and leave Keshet 12 and Reshet 13 in the current array (DVB-T). The meaning is that viewers without an Idan+ receiver that supports DVB-T2, could not watch Makan 33 after 1 November 2017. The reason for this decision is because of Makan 33's low rating and since it broadcasts only for several hours each day. IPBC's chairman, Gil Omer resisted the decision.

In January 2025, the Second Authority announced the closure of DVB-T mux. All TV and radio channels that were available on the old DVB-T mux moved to DVB-T2 on 29 January 2025.

== See also ==
- List of programs broadcast by Channel 2 (Israel)
- List of television channels in Israel
- Keshet 12
- Reshet 13
