= Tal Friedman =

Israeli actor (born 1963)

Tal Friedman טל פרידמן
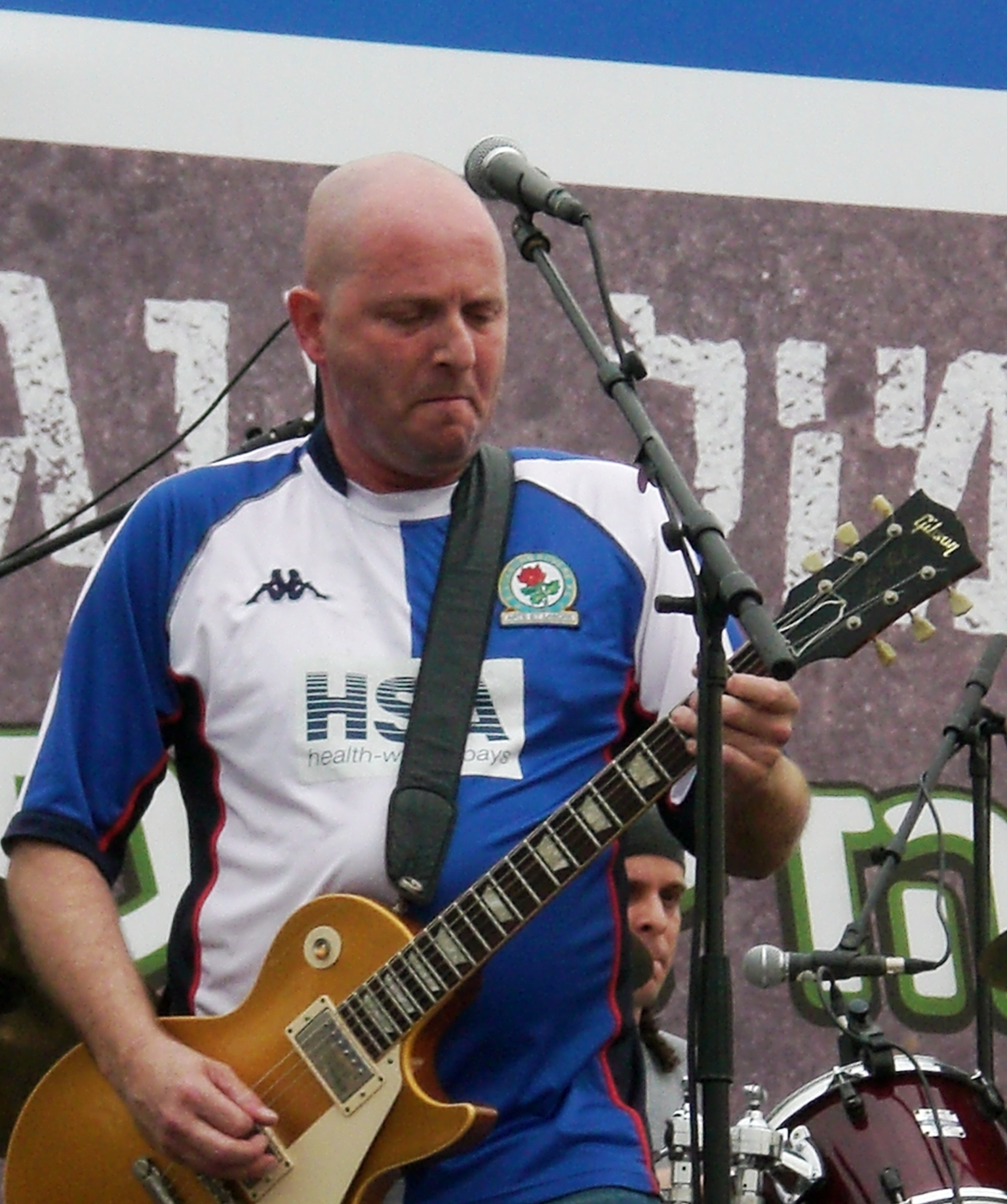
- Friedman performing with "The Krayot" in 2007
- Born: 20 December 1963 (age 62); Kiryat Ata, Israel
- Occupations: Actor; comedian; musician
- Years active: 1988–present
- Spouse: Iris

Tal Friedman (Hebrew: טל פרידמן; born 20 December 1963) is an Israeli actor, comedian and musician best known for starring in the Israeli sketch comedy show Eretz Nehederet.

== Biography ==
Friedman was born in Kiryat Ata, Israel, in 1963. His father was a holocaust survivor. He is of ashkenazi origin from Poland

He served in the Israeli Navy on a missile boat during the 1982 Lebanon War. He studied acting at Tel Aviv University, where he met Moshe Furster, with whom he put on his first act, Alilot Moshe Ba'ir Hagdola (עלילות משה בעיר הגדולה, lit: "Moshe's Adventures in the Big City"). During that time he also performed in several plays. His film appearances include Driks' Brother (1994), Right Back (1997), Riki Riki (2005), Joy (2005) and Schwartz Dynasty (2005). He was also the voice of Sid in the Hebrew dubbing of the Ice Age franchise.

His television career began with the "Tal and Moshe" with Furster, followed by a scheduled time in the program Zehu Ze!, Tzafdina Mearahat ("Tzafdina hosting") and Shaaruria ("Scandal"). In 1999, he began a late night show titled Halomot BeHaKitzis with Eyal Kitzis, and the two moved on to the show Heaven or Hell. In 2004 they both joined the cast of Eretz Nehederet. In 2007, they also cooperated on children's channel Logi.

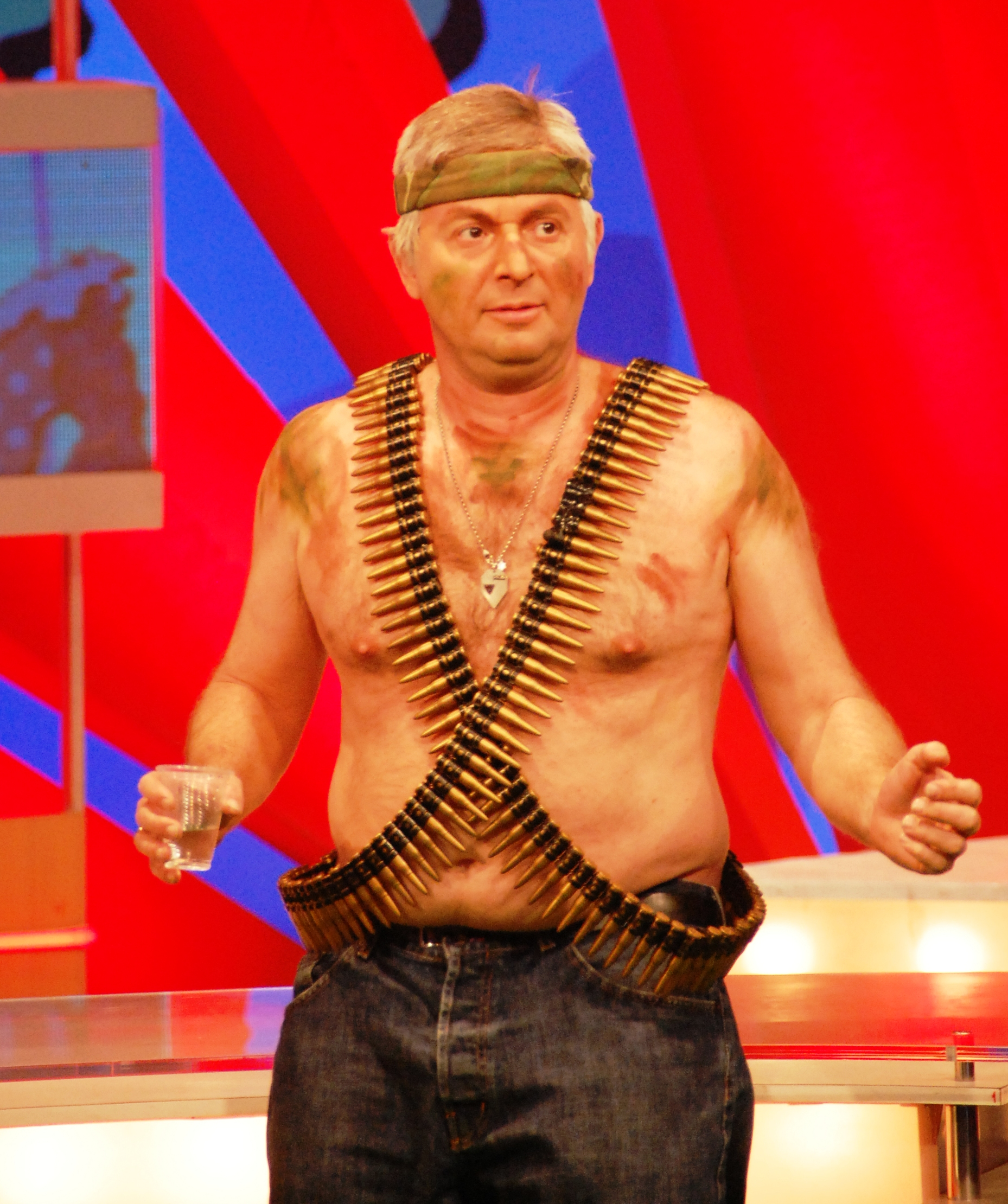
Tal Friedman as Roni Daniel on Eretz Nehederet

Friedman is married to Iris and has three children. He lives in Kiryat Tiv'on. In recent years, he has been leading a band named "Tal Friedman and the Krayot". He is an amateur meteorologist.

Tal appeared on The Singer in the Mask as the "Krembo", a type of Israeli marshmallow treat, being the first eliminated.

In 2015, he played for F.C. Haifa Robi Shapira in the Liga Gimel.

== Personal life ==
Friedman is married to Iris and they have three children, two of whom are adopted, a son and a daughter of Ethiopian origin. His adopted daughter Tamar is autistic. He resides in Kiryat Tivon.

He is known for his love of soccer and support for the Hapoel Haifa soccer team.

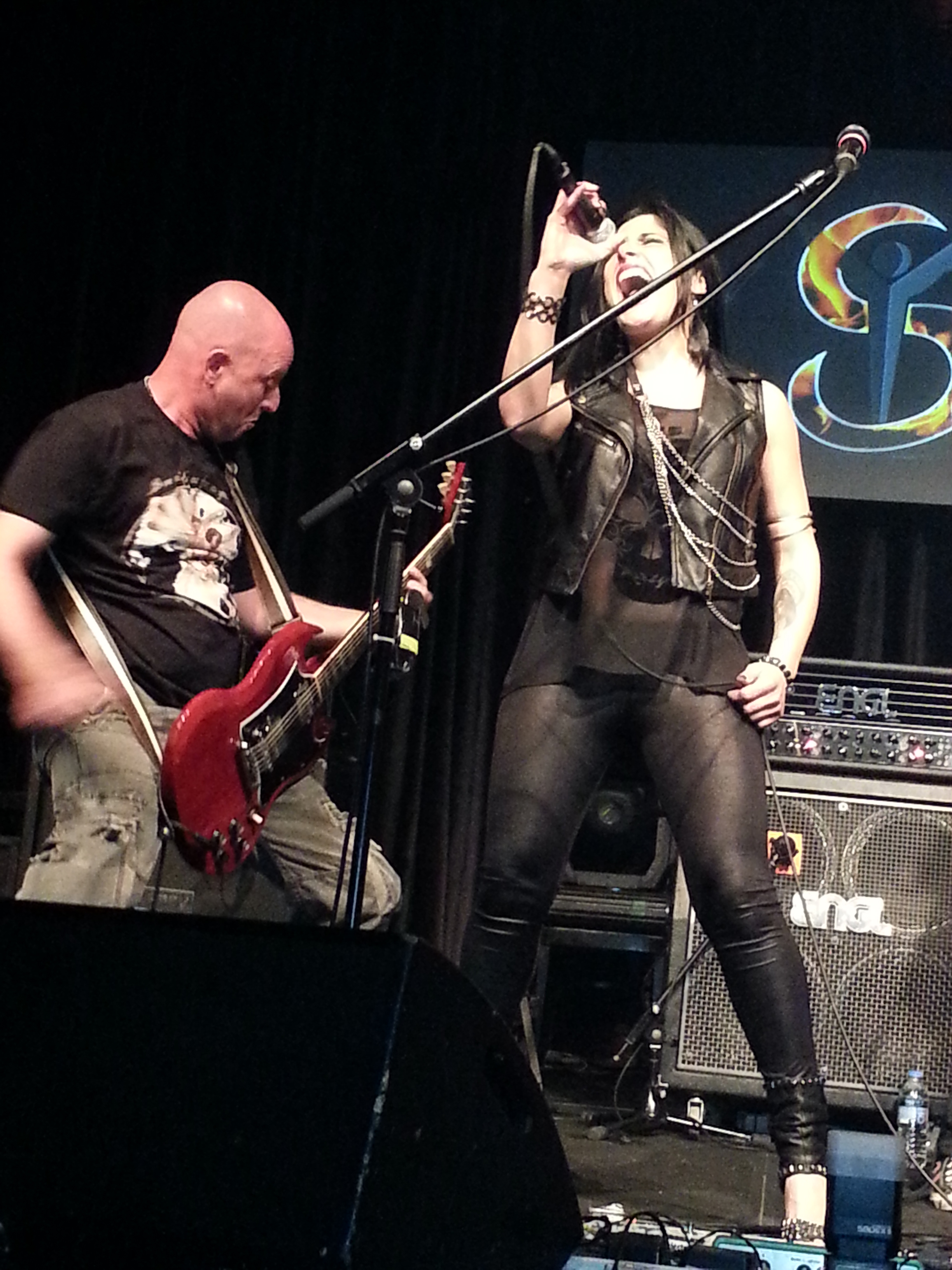
Tal Friedman and Mariangela Demurtas
