= Yaakov Bardugo =

Israeli businessman and commentator

- יעקב ברדוגו
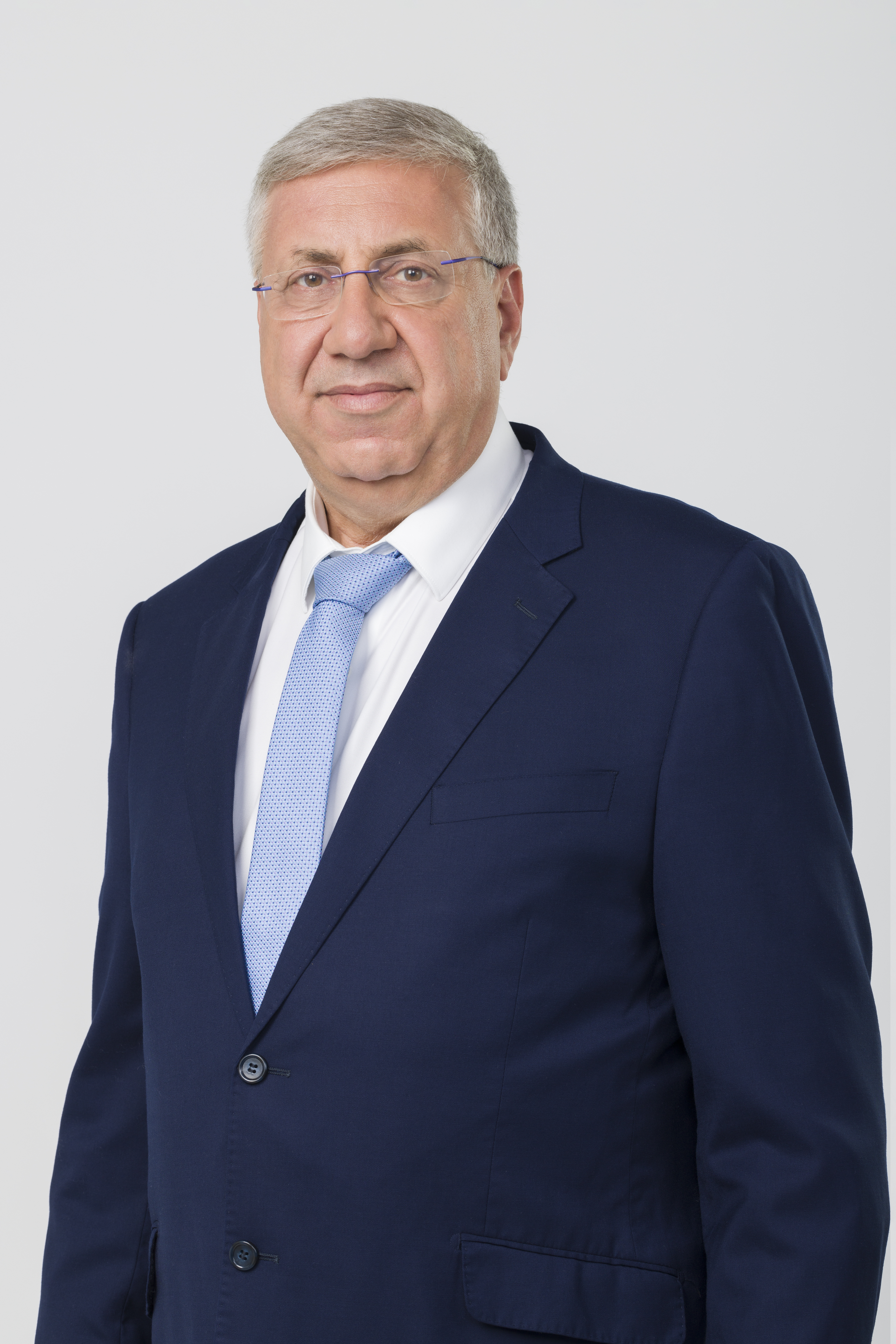

Faction represented in the Knesset
- 2026–: Likud

Personal details
- Born: March 23, 1965 (age 61) Lod, Israel
- Education: Tel Aviv University

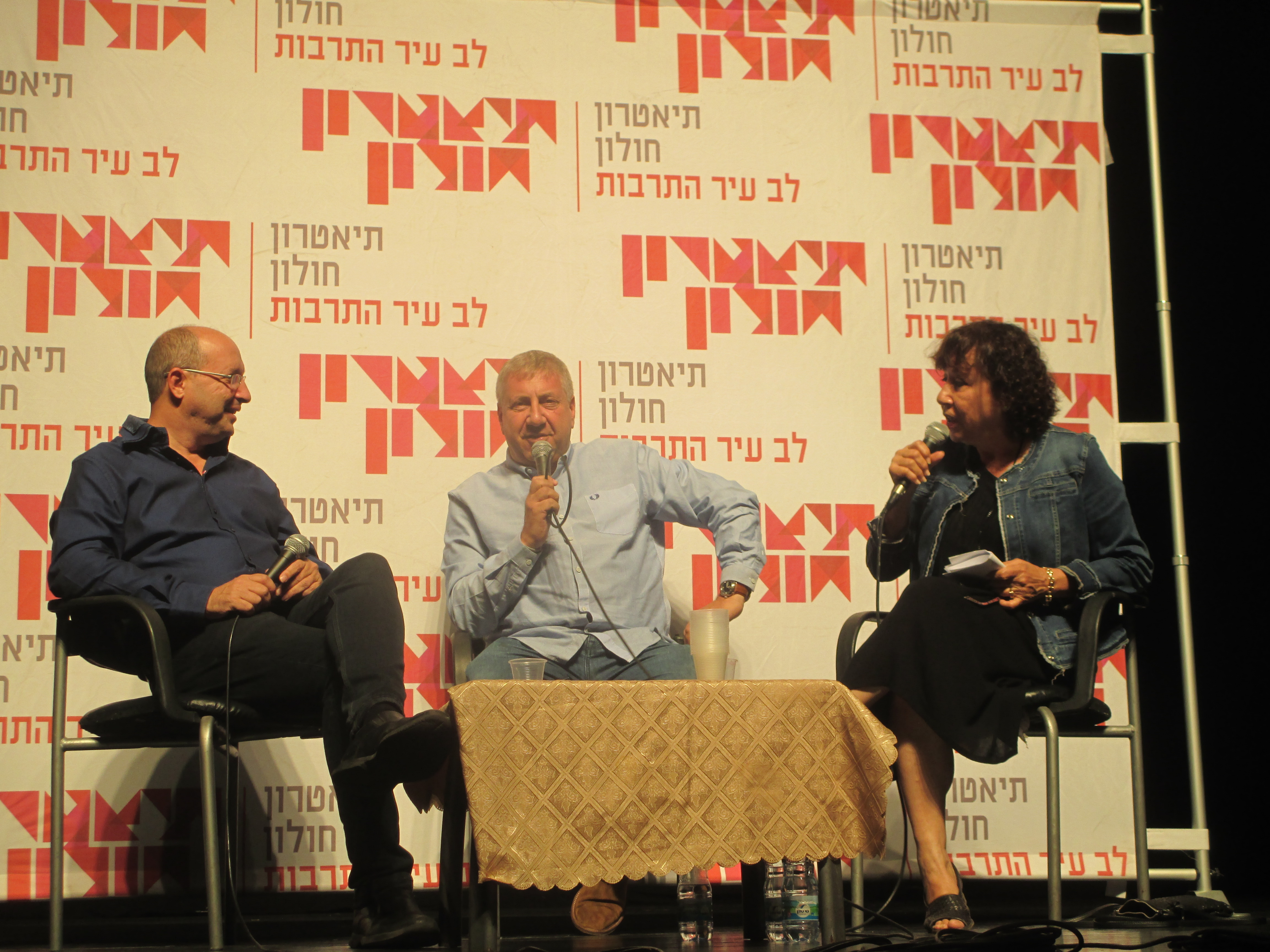
Bardugo with Avi Nissenkorn

Yaakov Bardugo (sometimes spelled Yaacov; Hebrew: יעקב ברדוגו; born 23 March 1965), also known as the Parshan Megish, is an Israeli politician who serves as a member of the Knesset for Likud, lawyer, businessman, journalist and political commentator for Channel 14 and Galei Yisrael. Bardugo previously worked as a commentator for Army Radio, as a columnist for Israel Hayom, and as the CEO of Mifal HaPais.

== Biography ==
Yaakov Bardugo was born in Lod to religiously observant Moroccan Jewish parents He is the youngest of six children. Bardugo's parents were born in the Moroccan city of Meknes, moved to Marseille in 1948 and to Israel in 1949.

Bardugo studied at the Noam Yeshiva in Pardes Hanna. Bardugo was then drafted into the IDF, where he served in the Military Intelligence Directorate and Unit 8200.

After his service, Bardugo received a political science degree from Tel Aviv University, and a Law degree from Tel Aviv University and the Ramot Mishpat School of Law.

While studying for his law degree, he was elected to lead a right-wing student body. Bardugo was a candidate for the leadership of the Students' union in 1988, but was not elected. He was admitted to the Israeli Bar in 1997.

== Business and civil service career ==
Bardugo headed the Lod branch of Project Renewal, and later became the deputy CEO and CEO of Mashcal, from 1990 to 1994, Bardugo served as the CEO of the Federation of Local Authorities in Israel.

== Political career ==
Bardugo sought election to the Knesset in 1996 on the Likud-Gesher-Tzomet ticket on behalf of Gesher, and received the 41st spot on the parties' joint list. He was not elected as the list won 32 seats. After the election, Foreign Minister David Levy appointed Bardugo as his envoy to Israeli–Palestinian negotiations. In 1997, Bardugo became the CEO of Mifal HaPais, serving until 2000. He then became an advisor to an investment firm.

In May 2006, Bardugo was hired to advise The Association for Israel's Soldiers on fundraising and lotteries. He was paid 1.2 million NIS for his services, which centered on the renewal of the Association's contract with Mifal HaPais. Bardugo's hiring was criticized by State Comptroller Micha Lindenstrauss.

Bardugo also served as an advisor to businessman Martin Schlaff, and represented him in the Hotel and Gambling businesses. He has also owned several companies, and co-owns an office building in Tel Aviv.

Bardugo was given a reserved slot on the Likud list in September 2026, in eleventh place, ahead of the 2026 Israeli legislative election. He was elected to the Knesset.

== Media career ==
=== Radio ===
During Avi Benayahu's tenure as head of Army Radio, Bardugo hosted a weekly current events show with Journalist Eitan Lifschitz. In 2008, he suspended himself during a police investigation into Mifal HaPais which closed the following year. Bardugo returned to Army Radio in 2013 as a political commentator, hosting a show alongside Eitan Lifschitz and later Moshe Schlonsky. During this period, he was criticized for aligning with, and promoting the views of Likud and Prime Minister Benjamin Netanyahu.

On 10 February 2022, Bardugo was removed from his current affairs slot. He was offered another slot, but refused and resigned on air the following day after criticizing Army Radio in a lengthy monologue. He sued the station's commander, the Ministry of Defense and Defense Minister Benny Gantz for 547,000 NIS in October 2022, claiming his removal was politically motivated.

In April 2022, Bardugo began hosting a daily current events show on Galei Yisrael alongside Danny Zaken. After Danny Zaken was appointed the interim commander of IDF radio, he was replaced in an alternating capacity by Doron Cohen and Moshe Cohen-Eliya

=== Television ===
In January 2020, Bardugo became a political commentator for Channel 14, and has hosted a weekly show on the channel since December 2022. From June 2022 to May 2023, he also hosted a daily show, initially alongside Tal Meir later with Itamar Fleischmann, and eventually on his own from March to May 2023.

Bardugo and l Sarah Beck, alleged that the CIA was behind the Israeli judicial reform protests.

=== In print ===
Bardugo was a weekly columnist for Israel Hayom until shortly after the beginning of the Gaza war in October 2023.

== Controversy ==
Netanyahu filed a police complaint against Bardugo in February 1993 as part of the Bibigate controversy, in which Bardugo was accused of helping politician David Levy blackmail Netanyahu. The case was closed three months later due to a lack of evidence.

Nir Hefetz, a former Advisor to Netanyahu, alleged in an affidavit that Bardugo's hiring as a commentator by Army Radio was the result of direct intervention by Netanyahu.

After the 2022 election, Bardugo represented Netanyahu in negotiations with potential coalition partners, while remaining a commentator for Channel 14. Amit Segal published an article, later confirmed by Bardugo, claiming that Netanyahu had offered to make Bardugo a government minister, and that Bardugo had turned him down. Bargudo was convicted of Defamation in February 2025 for stating in 2021 that journalist Raviv Drucker had extorted Defense Minister Benny Gantz. Bardugo was fined 50,000 NIS, alongside 10,000 NIS in legal fees. Bardugo has appealed the verdict. Bardugo was separately convicted that March of defaming Nir Hefetz, and was fined 100,000 NIS and 17,700 NIS in legal fees.

In May 2025, Ministers Yariv Levin, Miki Zohar and Shlomo Karhi alleged that Bardugo had attempted to threaten them for personal benefits. The police subsequently opened an investigation, and the three ministers stated that they weren't aware of any criminal behavior by Bardugo.

== Personal life ==
Bardugo is married and has two children. He resides in northern Tel Aviv.
