= K-Lo =

"K-Lo" is a nickname for:

- Kathryn Jean Lopez, conservative columnist
- Kenny Lofton, baseball player
