= Mehazkim =

- מחזקים
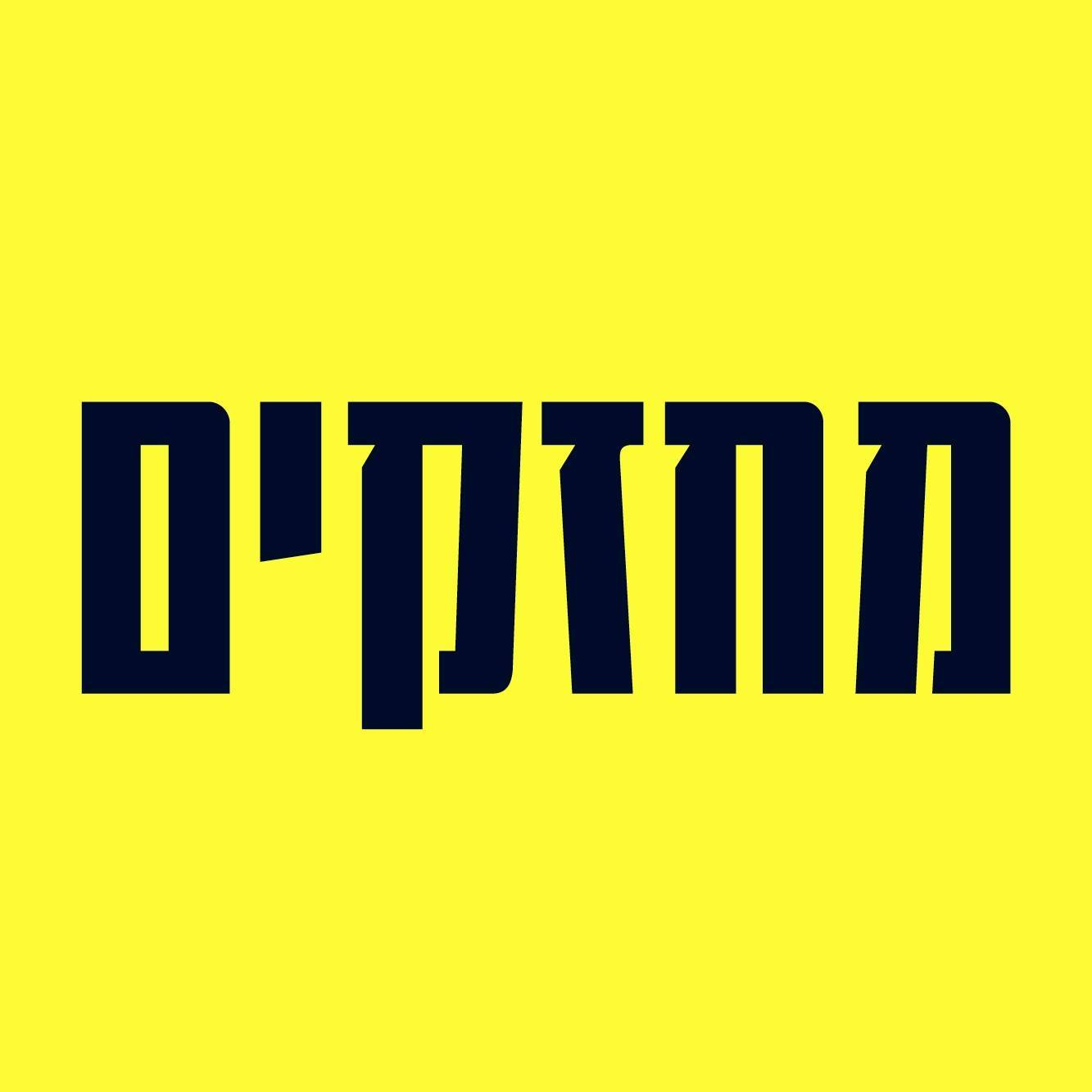
- Logo of Mehazkim
- Type: Non-profit; NGO
- Legal status: Active
- Purpose: Internet activism
- Methods: Internet activism, protest, propaganda
- Official language: Hebrew
- Key people: Ori Kol, Tom Feigin
- Budget: 3,083,043 NIS (819,982 US dollar) (2022)
- Volunteers: 12 (2020)

Mehazkim (Hebrew: מחזקים; lit. 'strengthening') is an Israeli non-profit organization that works through Internet activism on social media. they define themselves as a progressive digital movement that promotes left-wing ideas.

The organization invests a significant portion of its budget for sponsored promotion of content on social media in order to reach its target audience. they do so on Facebook, Instagram, Twitter (X) and TikTok.

== Background ==
Mehazkim was founded in 2017 by Ori Kol and Tom Feigin after Kol joined a 300-member Facebook group called "Strengthening the Left Online" (Hebrew: מחזקים את השמאל ברשת) aimed at promoting leftist political values online. They subsequently launched an official Facebook page for the organization. The organization receives primary support from the New Israel Fund.

Mehazkim fights for left-wing values in Israel (Including two-state solution), they also fight against the full occupation of Palestinian territories (a proposal of many Israeli right-wing figures), Jewish–Arab partnership for LGBT rights, human and citizen rights in Israel, the promotion and strengthening of democracy, and they have also taken active part in the 2023 Israeli judicial reform protests.

As of 2020, the number of members in the organization was 7, with 12 volunteers.

== Protests ==
Since 2019, the organization has been active in multiple protests:

- a campaign against Yaakov Bardugo news reports. Mehazkim has defined him as Netanyahu's puppet.
- a campaign and protests against the Killing of Eyad al-Hallaq
- a campaign against the full occupation of Palestinian territories
- a campaign against Kahanism and Lehava
- In June 2022, the organization initiated a campaign in which the Flag of Israel and the Flag of Palestine were hanged on a building billboards, side by side, with the caption "we are meant to live together" above them. Following widespread criticism of this, the signs were removed.
