= 103fm =

103FM
- Tel Aviv; Israel
- Frequencies: 90.2 MHz; 103 MHz

Programming
- Format: News/talk

Ownership
- Sister stations: eco99fm; 104.5FM Radio Tzafon

History
- First air date: 12 September 1995
- Former names: Radio Lelo Hafsaka

Technical information
- Licensing authority: Second Authority for Television and Radio

Links
- Website: 103fm.maariv.co.il

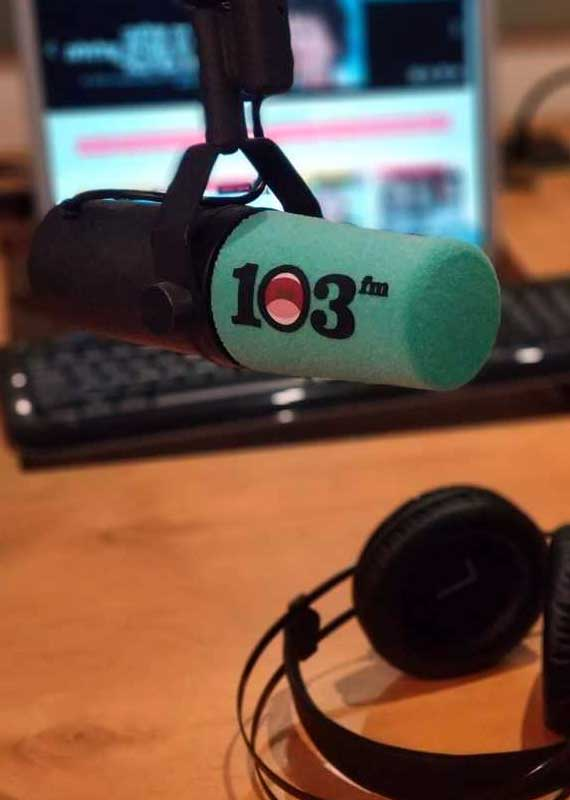
103FM's studio in Israel

103FM, formerly known as Radio Lelo Hafsaka (Hebrew: רדיו ללא הפסקה, lit. 'Radio Non-Stop'), is a regional radio station in Israel, primarily received in the Tel Aviv metropolitan area and surrounding regions on the frequency for which it is named. The station was established in 1995, during the first wave of the opening of regional radio stations in Israel. The station's broadcast content combines current affairs, satire, humor, advice, sports, politics, and more. The station broadcasts talk programs throughout most of the week and dedicates the weekends to broadcasting nostalgic Hebrew music programs. At night, the station re-broadcasts programs that aired during the day or the week.

In 2014, it was the highest rated commercial radio station in Israel with a 10% share of the radio listening audience.

Since 2021, the station's studios, along with the station eco99fm, are located in Ramat Hasharon, in a complex that previously served the Bezeq company. Prior to this, the studios were located for 20 years on Tapuach Israel Street in Givatayim. The station's CEO since late 2023 is Itamar Druckman.

== History ==
The station began broadcasting as Radio Lelo Hafsaka (Non-Stop Radio) on 12 September 1995 as one of the private station that was established during the first wave of the formation of regional radio stations in Israel. Michael Karpin headed the group that won the bid for the Dan area and managed it during its first year. In the regional radio tender held in 2008, the station was unopposed in its bid for the 16-year franchise for the Tel Aviv metropolitan area.

In 2016, it rebranded and abandoned the name Radio Lelo Hafsaka, moving to a talk radio format.

In 2018, it launched a new morning broadcast schedule, aiming to position itself as a news station. As part of this, Erel Segal was brought back to the station as a daily morning show host. In 2019, Yinon Magal and Ben Caspit started co-hosting a show together. In 2020, a new daily news program aired, hosted by journalists Golan Yochpaz (former CEO of Channel 10 News) and Anat Davidov.
