= The Truth About Hillary =

2005 biography by Edward Klein

- Author: Edward Klein
- Publisher: Sentinel HC
- Publication date: June 21, 2005
- Media type: Hardcover
- Pages: 336
- ISBN: 1-59523-006-8
- OCLC: 58791057
- Dewey Decimal: 328.73/092 B 22
- LC Class: E887.C55 K57 2005

The Truth About Hillary: What She Knew, When She Knew It, and How Far She'll Go to Become President is a controversial political biography about Hillary Clinton, then a Democratic senator from New York, written by Edward Klein, the former editor of The New York Times Magazine.

The 336-page book (ISBN 1-59523-006-8) was released by Sentinel HC, a conservative imprint of Penguin Group (USA), on June 21, 2005.

== Controversy ==
=== Before release ===
The book was considered controversial due to the way it discusses various issues concerning Hillary Clinton's behavior, personality, sexuality, the nature of her marriage to Bill Clinton, and her intentions for the future. It received criticism not just from the left but from the right as well.

The author's sources were questioned by the media immediately after the release of the book. An examination of the book conducted by leftist group Media Matters for America resulted in their viewpoint that "Klein's Attack Book [was] Poorly Researched, Poorly Written, Poorly-Sourced." The media watchdog organization goes on to state that the author "recycles long-debunked claims about the Clintons" and "relies on anonymous sources for much that isn't recycled—more than 70 footnotes refer to unnamed sources," and that the book has a "reliance on 'convenient rather than complete evidence.'"

Commentator Joe Conason wrote that "citizens hoping to discover anything new about the famous junior Senator from New York shouldn’t waste their time or money on his unoriginal and unreliable rant."

Philippe Reines, Hillary Clinton's press secretary, stated that the book was "full of blatant and vicious fabrications contrived by someone who writes trash for cash."

=== Criticism from conservatives ===
To that end, Kathryn Jean Lopez of National Review asked Klein, "Why on earth would you put such a terrible story in your book...that looks to be flimsily sourced at that?" regarding his suggestion that Chelsea Clinton was conceived in an act of marital rape. Columnist John Podhoretz of The New York Post stated that the book is "one of the most sordid volumes I've ever waded through." According to Alicia Colon of the New York Sun, "Mr. Klein’s title led me to believe that his book would be pointing out these little hypocrisies, but instead he grovels below the belt — delving into the Clintons’ sex life, which is none of our business."

With the critical response to the book being so overwhelmingly negative, some commentators on the right have speculated that the book was intentionally written as a political device to indirectly boost support for a possible 2008 presidential run by Hillary Clinton. Proponents of this theory include former Ronald Reagan speechwriter Peggy Noonan and talk-show host Rush Limbaugh. Noonan, who also wrote a book critical of Hillary Clinton, states on the editorial page of The Wall Street Journal that Klein "assumes the market is conservative and conservatives are stupid. They're not, actually. They want solid sourcing and new information that is true," concluding that this book only serves to "inoculate [Hillary Clinton] against future and legitimate criticism and revelations."

Some commentators on the left feel that the nearly unanimous condemnation of The Truth About Hillary by the right may also be a well-coordinated political maneuver. Indeed, Keelin McDonel states in the centrist political journal The New Republic that "conservatives are launching a preemptive strike on what Klein identifies as one of Clinton's central mantras: 'victimhood can be a political plus.'"
