= Edward Klein =

American author and editor

Edward J. Klein (born 1936) is an American author, former foreign editor of Newsweek, and former editor-in-chief of The New York Times Magazine (1977–1987). He has written about the Kennedys, Bill Clinton, Hillary Clinton, Barack Obama, Michelle Obama, and Donald Trump.

== Early life ==
Born in Yonkers, New York, Klein attended Colgate University, graduated from Columbia University School of General Studies, and received an MS degree from the Columbia University Graduate School of Journalism.

== Professional life ==
Klein is the former foreign editor of Newsweek and served as the editor-in-chief of The New York Times Magazine from 1977 to 1987. He frequently contributes to Vanity Fair and Parade and writes a weekly celebrity gossip column in Parade called "Walter Scott's Personality Parade" under the pseudonym "Walter Scott." (The Walter Scott pseudonym had originally been used by Lloyd Shearer, who wrote the column from 1958 to 1991.) He also writes books, many of which have been on The New York Times Best Seller list. Additionally, he was the principal for the Business Communications School at The Euclid High School Complex. He was photographed by Humans of New York photographer Brandon Stanton, on June 12, 2014, which led to his personal website crashing due to a high volume of visitors. Klein is also a contributor for the New York Post.

== Criticism ==
Klein received extensive criticism for his 2005 biography of Hillary Clinton, The Truth About Hillary. Politico criticized the book for "serious factual errors, truncated and distorted quotes and overall themes [that] don't gibe with any other serious accounts of Clinton's life." The conservative columnist John Podhoretz criticized the book in the New York Post, "Thirty pages into it, I wanted to take a shower. Sixty pages into it, I wanted to be decontaminated. And 200 pages into it, I wanted someone to drive stakes through my eyes so I wouldn't have to suffer through another word." In National Review, conservative columnist Jim Geraghty wrote, "Folks, there are plenty of arguments against Hillary Clinton, her policies, her views, her proposals, and her philosophies. This stuff ain't it. Nobody on the right, left, or center ought to stoop to this level."

Kathryn Jean Lopez of National Review asked Klein in a June 20, 2005, interview, "Why on earth would you put such a terrible story in your book ... that looks to be flimsily sourced at that?," regarding his suggestion that Chelsea Clinton was conceived in an act of marital rape. Facing criticism from both the left and right for making the claim, Klein eventually backed away from the insinuation in an interview with radio host Jim Bohannon on June 23, 2005.

The British newspaper The Guardian pointed out a number of verifiable factual errors in Klein's 2014 book Blood Feud.

Klein has also come under fire for his use of anonymous quotes, purported to be from the subjects of his books, which he claims he received from anonymous insiders. The credibility of such quotes has been questioned by writers such as Joe Conason and Salon's Simon Maloy and conservative commentators Rush Limbaugh and Peggy Noonan. "Some of the quotes strike me as odd, in the sense that I don't know people who speak this way," Limbaugh said of Klein's work, describing the sources as "grade school chatter."

== Personal life ==
Klein is the father of two grown children, Karen (former manager of the Four Seasons restaurant in New York City), and Alec (a former professor at Northwestern University). He has been divorced twice. He was married to Dolores J. Barrett, senior vice president for Worldwide Public Relations at Polo Ralph Lauren, who died on 24 December 2013 in Manhattan. Klein is the stepfather-in-law of Ruth Shalit.

== Books ==
- If Israel Lost the War (with Richard Z. Chesnoff and Robert Littell), Coward-McCann, 1969
- All Too Human: The Love Story of Jack and Jackie Kennedy, Pocket Books, 1996
- Just Jackie: Her Private Years, Ballantine Books, 1999
- The Kennedy Curse: Why Tragedy Has Haunted America's First Family for 150 Years, Pocket Books, 2003
- Farewell, Jackie: A Portrait of Her Final Days, Viking Books, 2004
- The Truth About Hillary: What She Knew, When She Knew It, and How Far She'll Go to Become President, Sentinel HC, 2005
- Katie: The Real Story, Crown Publishers, 2007
- Ted Kennedy: The Dream That Never Died, Crown Publishing, 2009
- The Obama Identity (with John LeBoutillier), 2010
- The Amateur: Barack Obama in the White House, Regnery Publishing, 2012
- Blood Feud: The Clintons vs. the Obamas, Regnery Publishing, 2014
- Unlikeable: The Problem with Hillary, Regnery Publishing, 2015
- Guilty as Sin: Uncovering New Evidence of Corruption and How Hillary Clinton and the Democrats Derailed the FBI Investigation, Regnery Publishing, 2016
- All Out War: The Plot to Destroy Trump, Regnery Publishing, 2017
