= Yinon Magal =

Israeli journalist and politician

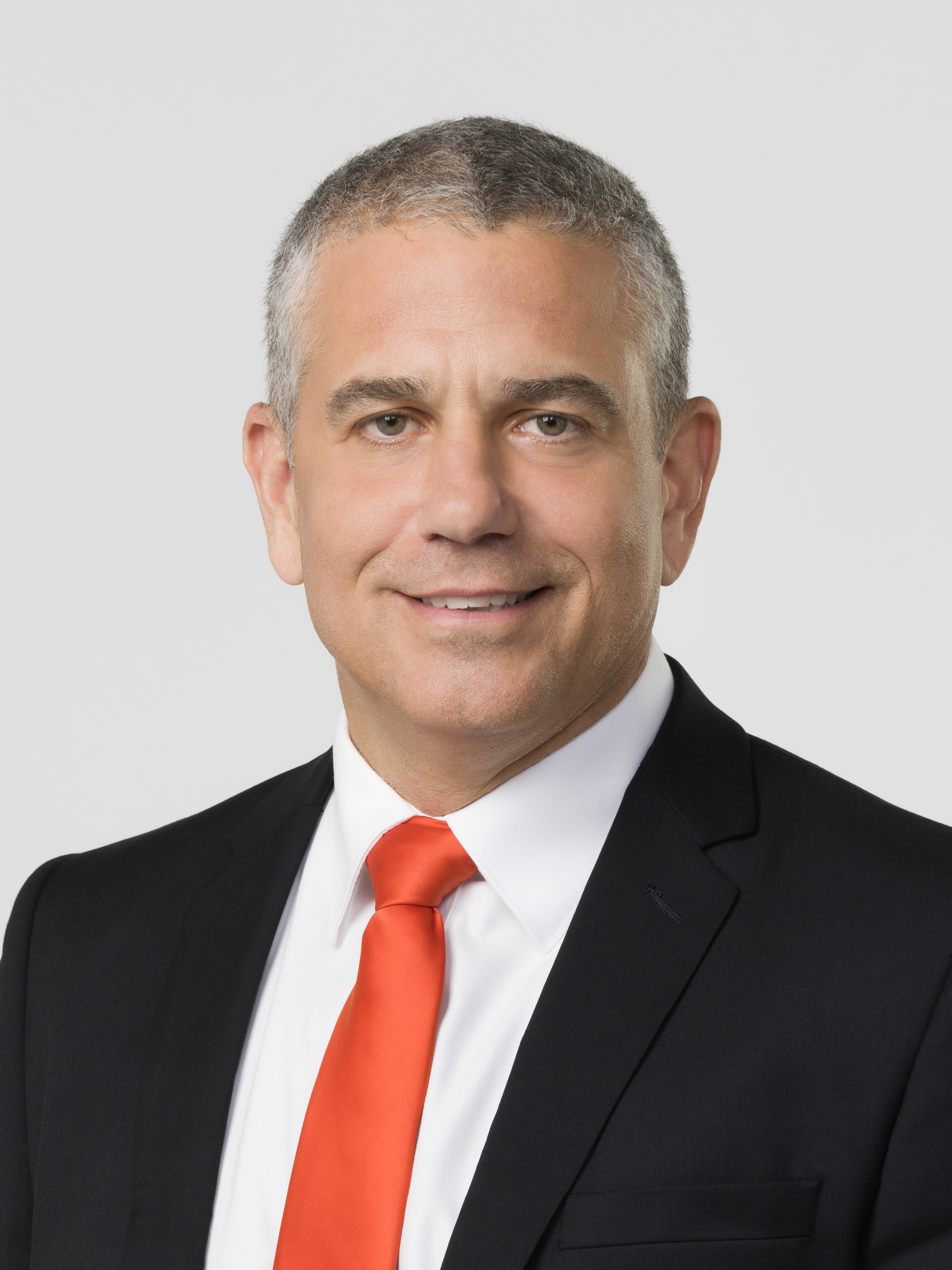
- Magal in 2022

Faction represented in the Knesset
- 2015: The Jewish Home

Personal details
- Born: 27 April 1969 (age 57) Bat Yam, Israel

Yinon Magal (Hebrew: ינון אלישע מגל; born 27 April 1969) is an Israeli far-right journalist and politician. He served as a member of the Knesset for the Jewish Home for most of 2015. In November 2015, Magal announced his resignation from the Knesset following sexual harassment allegations. Magal presents the program "The Patriots" on the channel Now 14 and broadcasts a daily program on the radio station 103fm alongside Ben Caspit. In the past, he was the presenter of Channel 1's "View Edition" and the editor in chief of the Walla website.

He is identified with the national-religious and right-wing conservative camp in Israeli politics and public discourse. In recent years, he has become a prominent voice in the Israeli media landscape, known for his outspoken views on political and social issues and for his influence within the right-wing public sphere. He has attracted controversy and allegations of racism as well as statements regarding the victims of the October 7 attacks.

== Biography ==
Magal was born and raised in Bat Yam and is of Ashkenazi ancestry. He attended high school in the Hebrew University Secondary School in Jerusalem. During his IDF national service he was a member of the Sayeret Matkal special forces, and was involved in the abduction of Abdel Karim Obeid. After leaving the army he joined Kol Yisrael. He later moved to Army Radio, where he reported on Israeli settlements, before joining Hadashot 10, where he was a reporter on military affairs. He studied Islam, Middle Eastern studies and Jewish thought at the Hebrew University of Jerusalem, gaining a Bachelor's degree. He later worked as an anchor on Channel 1, presenting the Mabat LaHadashot news show. In 2012 he joined the Walla! news website, where he became editor.

In December 2014 he announced he was leaving Walla! to enter politics. He joined the Jewish Home party, and was placed sixth on its list for the 2015 elections. He was elected to the Knesset as the party won eight seats. However, in November 2015, Magal announced his resignation from the Knesset following sexual harassment allegations. In January 2016 the police investigation into him was closed.

In 2020 Magal appeared on The Singer in the Mask as "Cactus". He was the second contestant eliminated.

Magal is an outspoken and influential Benjamin Netanyahu supporter. Magal has been accused of making light of October 7 attack victims, including when he said in 2024 that as a religious man, it “bothered” him that there was a statue of the the Buddha at the Nova music festival where hundreds of people were killed. In 2026, he described the families of hostages who accuse Netanyahu of abandoning them as “the most despicable people who live in the State of Israel.”

=== Tweet celebrating Israeli airstrikes on Gaza ===
In 2024 he made controversial post on his X account when he joked about a fire following an Israeli airstrike on Rafah, describing it as a "Hanukkah gift".

=== Tweet celebrating Iranian missile strike on Weizmann Institute ===
After an Iranian missile strike on the Weizmann Institute of Science inflicted serious damage on some of the institute's labs, setting back research there by several years, Yinon Magal posted on X: "The Holy One, Blessed be He 1, Weizmann Institute 0."

=== Accusations of racism ===
In an interview with Yedioth Ahronoth, Magal repeatedly referred to Gadi Eisenkot, a politician who opposes Benjamin Netanyahu, as a "monkey," stating: "He's a monkey, don't you understand? They put a monkey whom all the elitist Ashkenazim manage. He's a monkey. His name is Moroccan-Mizrahi."

Eisenkot's Yashar political party characterized the statement as a form of anti-Mizrahi racism.

== Personal life ==
In 2005 he married Gitit, an interior designer. They are the parents of four children and lived in Tel Aviv. In March 2022 the couple separated.
