= If Israel Lost the War =

1969 alternate history political novel

- Author: Robert Littell, Richard Z. Chesnoff and Edward Klein
- Language: English, Hebrew
- Genre: alternate history
- Publisher: Coward-McCann
- Publication date: 1969
- Publication place: Israel
- Pages: 253

If Israel Lost the War is a 1969 alternate history political novel written jointly by Robert Littell, Richard Z. Chesnoff and Edward Klein.

== Synopsis ==
The book's point of divergence is the assumption the Arab air forces on June 5, 1967, launch a surprise attack and destroy the Israeli Air Force, rather than the other way around as occurred in actual history. The Arab armies launch a lightning ground attack and, in an exact mirror image of the actual Six-Day War, conquer the entire territory of Israel by June 10, 1967. The United States, embroiled in the Vietnam War, takes no action to intervene in the Israeli-Arab war, and the same is true for every other country (except for a valiant but futile sending of some planes by the Netherlands). As Sirhan Sirhan returns home to Jordan to celebrate the conquest of Israel, Robert F. Kennedy is never assassinated and goes on to defeat Richard Nixon in the 1968 election, becoming the 38th US president (Hubert Humphrey became the 37th president in the book's alternate timeline following Lyndon Johnson's resignation in January 1968).

Meanwhile, Egyptian troops capture and publicly execute Moshe Dayan in Tel Aviv. The victorious Arab armies establish new secret police units, which include former Nazi war criminals serving in advisory roles, to maintain order in the newly occupied territory. As depicted in the book, the Palestinians get no benefit from the Arab victory and are not granted a state of their own, with Israel being partitioned between Egypt, Jordan, Syria and Lebanon. Also, the Palestinian refugees are not allowed to return to their pre-1948 homes despite them now being under Arab rule. The book closes with Yigal Alon, a former commander of the Palmach militia, planning a Jewish insurgency.

The book is written in a semi-documentary manner, with multiple and constantly-shifting points of view characters, detailed maps, and numerous fictional quotations from the international media. It was controversial for its graphic depiction of atrocities against the Israeli Jewish population being committed by the victorious Arab armies.

== Golda Meir reference ==
According to the Israeli columnist Dan Margalit, the book owes its inception at least in part to an interview which the three authors had with Golda Meir. When they asked her some critical questions about the recently started Israeli occupation of the West Bank and Gaza Strip, Golda answered, "You better think of what would have happened if Israel lost the war". That gave them the idea of writing a book on that theme. In the book, Meir is depicted as having escaped from Israel at the last moment and set up an Israeli government-in-exile that is headed by a fellow exile, David Ben Gurion.

== Reception ==
The book in Hebrew translation was a bestseller in Israel itself and was used for propaganda by its government agencies and in the political debate between right and left. The journalist and peace activist Uri Avnery published in HaOlam HaZeh weekly an editorial strongly criticising the book as well as a review in Life. Avnery stated that its starting point was implausible since even with its air force destroyed, Israel would not have been so quickly and totally overwhelmed. Avnery pointed out that in a considerable part of the 1947–1949 Palestine War, in which Avnery himself participated, it was the Arab side that dominated the air, but the newly created Israeli military still won the war. Avnery also criticised the three American writers by stating, "Though their intention is to help Israel's propaganda case, their book might help foster intransigence and dangerous illusions on the Arab side".

Varda Klein wrote, "Such a devastating attack does not come out of the blue. The Israeli Air Force laid meticulous plans years before 1967, and its pilots regularly held rigorous exercises to prepare. The Arabs would have had to do the same, to achieve like results.... A detailed joint strategic planning by Egypt, Syria and Jordan would have been highly unlikely, given that these regimes were virtually as suspicious and hostile to each other as they were to Israel. It would have been extremely difficult to hide from Israel joint large scale exercises of the Arab air forces. A strategic rapprochement between Egypt and Jordan would have been impossible to hide, it would have greatly alarmed Israel, and the entire Middle East configuration would have been different long before June 1967; indeed, such a situation might have impelled Israel into a preemptive strike already in 1966".

Jean-Claude Kaufmann of the Comité français pour la paix au Moyen-Orient (French Committee for Peace in The Middle East) remarked in 1970: "It is entirely plausible that, had Arab armies conquered Israel, they would have perpetrated terrible atrocities and imposed a very harsh occupation regime. What I find completely implausible is the assumption that even after winning and conquering Israel, the victorious Arab states would have still kept Palestinian refugees in their camps and not let them return to their lost homes. Why? The book describes the Arab victors systematically destroying all the hundreds of Israeli kibbutzim - and then just leaving desolate empty ruins in their place. Why should Nasser have done that? It would have been completely in his interest to re-establish the Palestinian villages which many of these kibbutzim displaced in the aftermath of 1948, to do it with a fanfare of worldwide publicity and with returning Palestinian refugees singing endless paeans of praise to their Egyptian benefactor. There is no conceivable reason within the book's plot for the way the Egyptian President is shown to be acting - but there is a clear and obvious reason for the three American authors to have attributed to him such conduct. Had there been scenes of joyful returning Palestinian refugees, it would have disturbed the book's stark polar dichotomy of cruel barbarous Arabs vs. Jewish Israeli innocent victims/courageous resisters. It would have intruded an element of ambiguity, a reminder to the reader that in the Middle East Conflict there are neither complete Saints not utter Demons. Obviously, these authors wanted no ambiguity..."

== Legacy ==
Though well-known and often debated in both the US and Israel, the book is by now largely forgotten. In May 2010 Israeli right-wing columnist Hagai Segal published a two-page summary of it in the Makor Rishon newspaper, proposing to his fellow-rightists to get a new edition published as part of their efforts to mobilise Israeli public opinion against the Obama Administration's Middle East peace plans.

An Israeli alternate history site run by Asaf Shoval featured a variant version (in Hebrew) which begins with the same devastating Arab aerial attack, but has a new point of divergence with the Egyptians (rather than the Israelis, as in real history) attacking the USS Liberty (AGTR-5) and killing many of its crew. This provides President Johnson with a pretext to launch a massive American intervention and save Israel at the last moment. Israel is badly battered, having lost much of its territory and citizens and becoming in effect an American protectorate, but gradually recovers and greatly prospers economically.

== Earlier Kishon article ==
In the aftermath of the 1956 Sinai War, the Israeli satirist Ephraim Kishon published a short piece with a similar theme, entitled "How we lost the World's Sympathy" (איך איבדנו את אהדת העולם). In Kishon's alternate history, Israel neither concludes an anti-Egyptian military alliance with Britain and France, unlike actual history, nor embarks on the 1956 Sinai War. With no such alliance, France does not supply Mirage fighter jets to Israel. Egypt gets advanced jets from the Soviet Union, which gives it a decisive military advantage, which it uses to launch a devastating surprise attack on Israel in 1957. Israel is totally conquered, and Egypt goes on to depose King Hussein of Jordan and to annex his kingdom. Afterwards, the destroyed Israel gets a lot of international sympathy, but far too late to do any good. All the international community can do is keep the empty chair of the Israeli Ambassador standing in the UN General Assembly and implore President Nasser of Egypt to treat humanely a handful of Israeli refugees huddling in the ruins of Tel Aviv. Kishon's obvious conclusion was that it is better to be internationally condemned for winning than to get sympathy after losing.

The article was republished after the 1967 war in a collection of articles and cartoons which Kishon published jointly with Kariel Gardosh ("Dosh"), "Sorry that we won" (סליחה שניצחנו). That was translated to English and distributed in the US and might have been known to the writers of "If Israel Lost the War".
