= Hapatriotim =

- Genre: Current affairs, Satire
- Created by: Now 14
- Presented by: Yinon Magal (2019–present); formerly Erel Segal (2014–2018)
- Starring: Various publicists
- Theme music composer: "The Next War (Trailer Music)" by Diane Short, Cris Derksen, and Helen Goucher (2014–2018, 2019–2021)
- Country of origin: Israel
- Original language: Hebrew

Production
- Production locations: Various studios, including Ynet Studios, Mizmor Studios, Memad Studios, Jerusalem Capital Studios, and the Now 14 Media Complex in Modi'in
- Running time: Approx. 75 minutes (extended to ~120 minutes during wartime)

Original release
- Network: Now 14
- Release: 2 November 2014 – present

Hapatriotim (Hebrew: הפטריוטים lit. The Patriots) is a daily Israeli current affairs television program hosted by Yinon Magal, airing on Now 14 since its original launch in 2014. The program features a main presenter and a rotating panel of commentators who discuss daily public issues, occasionally incorporating satirical segments.

The show is broadcast from Saturday night through Thursday, typically between 21:00 and 22:30.
