= John LeBoutillier =

American politician (born 1953)

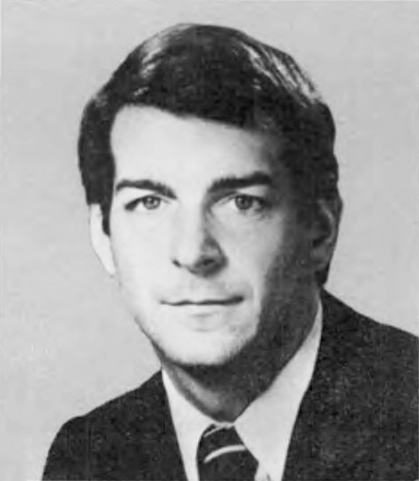

Member of the U.S. House of Representatives from New York's 6th district
- In office January 3, 1981 – January 3, 1983
- Preceded by: Lester L. Wolff
- Succeeded by: Joseph P. Addabbo (redistricted)

Personal details
- Born: May 26, 1953 (age 73) Glen Cove, New York, U.S.
- Party: Republican
- Education: Harvard University (BA, MBA)

John LeBoutillier (born May 26, 1953) is an American political columnist, pundit, and former Republican member of the United States House of Representatives from New York.

== Education ==
LeBoutillier graduated from the Brooks School in North Andover, Massachusetts, in 1971. He graduated magna cum laude from Harvard University in 1976, and earned a Master of Business Administration from Harvard Business School in 1979.

LeBoutillier first rose to national prominence in 1974. While still a college student at Harvard, he raised over a quarter million dollars for the campaign of former Vietnam War prisoner of war Leo K. Thorsness, a South Dakota Republican campaigning to unseat liberal senator George McGovern.

LeBoutillier's efforts on behalf of Thorsness caught the attention of President Ford's election campaign and in 1976 he was appointed regional coordinator, responsible for all field activities in New Jersey.

== Member of Congress ==
LeBoutillier was elected to Congress in 1980, representing New York's 6th District. He defeated 16-year incumbent Lester L. Wolff to become the youngest member of the 97th Congress. He served on the House Foreign Affairs Committee and as a member of Special House POW/MIA Task Force. After redistricting in 1982, LeBoutillier ran unsuccessfully for re-election versus Robert J. Mrazek in New York's 3rd congressional district.

=== Election violation ===
In 1983, LeBoutillier was fined $7,000 by the Federal Election Commission for violating federal election laws during the course of his 1980 congressional campaign. With contributions by individuals limited to $1,000 per person, LeBoutillier accepted a $200,500 contribution from his mother. LeBoutillier's mother was also fined $7,000.

== Political commentator ==
Upon leaving Congress, LeBoutillier continued to be active on the Vietnam War POW/MIA issue. He founded the Sky Hook II Project, dedicated to recovering living American POWs in Southeast Asia. He has made trips to Laos and Vietnam and also met with Lao and Vietnamese leaders in Hanoi, Ho Chi Minh City, Jakarta, New York City, Vientiane, and Paris.

LeBoutillier was a frequent guest on radio and television and had hosted radio talk show programs on WMCA radio and WABC radio. He conducted an exclusive television interview with Aleksandr Solzhenitsyn for NBC's Tomorrow Show in 1981, and interviewed Richard Nixon for ABC Radio in 1984. The interview was Nixon's first live network radio appearance since leaving the White House. He has been a frequent guest commentator on The Today Show, 20/20, Nightline, Crossfire, and Imus in the Morning. In 2004, he appeared on The Daily Show with Jon Stewart to discuss his plans to build a "Counter-Clinton Library" in Little Rock near the Clinton Presidential Library.

He joined with noted Canadian broadcaster Arlene Bynon in December 2010, to launch Bynon/LeBoutillier, a talk radio show simultaneously airing on WABC in New York City and AM640 in Toronto while also airing in the United Kingdom.

In January 2021, LeBoutillier signed a letter calling on Republicans to impeach President Donald Trump after the 2021 storming of the United States Capitol.

=== Books ===
LeBoutillier has written books, most notably the 1978 best-seller Harvard Hates America. In 1989 he wrote Vietnam Now; The Case for Normalization and in 1979 co-authored a novel, Primary. He is the co-author, with Edward Klein, of The Obama Identity.

He has been a contributor to The New York Times, the New York Post and The Wall Street Journal, among others.

== Personal life ==
LeBoutillier grew up on Long Island’s North Shore. His father was Thomas LeBoutillier, a member of a prominent family and onetime Grumman test pilot. His mother, Pamela LeBoutillier (née Tower), was the daughter of Roderick Tower and Flora Payne Whitney, a member of the Vanderbilt family and Whitney family. Mrs. LeBoutillier was a distant cousin of the late Senator John Tower of Texas. LeBoutillier's great great grandfather was William Collins Whitney, Secretary of the Navy under President Grover Cleveland. Another great great grandfather was Charlemagne Tower. LeBoutillier is a great grandson of Gertrude Vanderbilt Whitney, founder of the Whitney Museum of American Art, and he is also a descendant of railroad tycoon Cornelius Vanderbilt.

He is a resident of Old Westbury, New York.

== Popular culture ==
In 2022, LeBoutillier was referenced in the Netflix television series Russian Doll, when the time-traveling protagonist reads a 1982 newspaper on the New York subway titled “The Two Faces of John LeBoutillier.”

U.S. House of Representatives
Preceded by Lester L. Wolff	Member of the U.S. House of Representatives from New York's 6th congressional district 1981–1983	Succeeded by Joseph P. Addabbo
U.S. order of precedence (ceremonial)
Preceded by Bruce Caputo as Former U.S. Representative	Order of precedence of the United States as Former U.S. Representative	Succeeded by Fred J. Eckert as Former U.S. Representative
