= Robert Littell (author) =

American novelist and former journalist (born 1935)

- Born: January 8, 1935 (age 91); New York City, U.S.
- Education: Alfred University
- Occupation: Novelist
- Children: Jonathan Littell Jesse Littell

Robert Littell (born January 8, 1935) is an American novelist and former journalist who resides in France. He specialises in spy novels that often concern the CIA and the Soviet Union.

Robert Littell was born in Brooklyn, New York on January 8, 1935, to a Jewish family, of Russian Jewish origin. He is a 1956 graduate of Alfred University in western New York. He spent four years in the U.S. Navy and served at times as his ship's navigator, antisubmarine warfare officer, communications officer, and deck watch officer.

Later Littell became a journalist and worked many years for Newsweek during the Cold War. He was a foreign correspondent for the magazine from 1965 to 1970.

Littell is an amateur mountain climber and is the father of award-winning novelist Jonathan Littell and painter Jesse Littell. His brother, Alan Littell (1929–2024), was also an author and journalist.

He is the brother-in-law of the French writer Bernard du Boucheron (1928–2024).

== Bibliography ==
=== Novels ===
- The Defection of A. J. Lewinter (1973)
- Sweet Reason (1974)
- The October Circle (1975)
- Mother Russia. New York: Harcourt Brace Jovanovich. 1978. ISBN 9780151626380.
- The Debriefing (1979)
- The Amateur. New York: The Overlook Press. 1981. ISBN 9781585674695.
- The Sisters. Toronto: Bantam Books. 1986. ISBN 9780553050974.
- The Revolutionist (1988)
- The Once and Future Spy (1990)
- An Agent in Place (1991)
- The Visiting Professor (1994)
- Walking Back the Cat (1997)
- The Company (2002)
- Legends (2005)
- Vicious Circle (2006)
- The Stalin Epigram. New York: Simon & Schuster. 2009. ISBN 9781416598640.
- Young Philby (2012)
- A Nasty Piece of Work (2013)
- The Mayakovsky Tapes (2016)
- Comrade Koba. New York: The Overlook Press. 2020. ISBN 9781419748325.
- A Plague on Both Your Houses: A Novel in the Shadow of the Russian Mafia (2024)
- Bronshtein in the Bronx (2025)

=== Semi-fiction ===
- If Israel Lost the War (alternate history) (with Richard Z. Chesnoff and Edward Klein) (1969)

=== Non-fiction ===
- For the Future of Israel (with Shimon Peres) (1998)
- The Czech Black Book (editor) (1969) Discussed by Littell in "A legend in his own time" Interview by Ali Karim. January Magazine.

=== Films and Television ===
- The Amateur (1981 film)
- The Company (miniseries)
- Legends (TV series)
- The Amateur (2025 film)

=== Awards ===
- The Defection of A. J. Lewinter. 1973 British Crime Writers' Association's Gold Dagger Award for fiction.
- Legends. 2005 Los Angeles Times Book Prize in the Mystery/Thriller category.
