= Ben Caspit =

Israeli journalist (born 1960)

- בן כספית
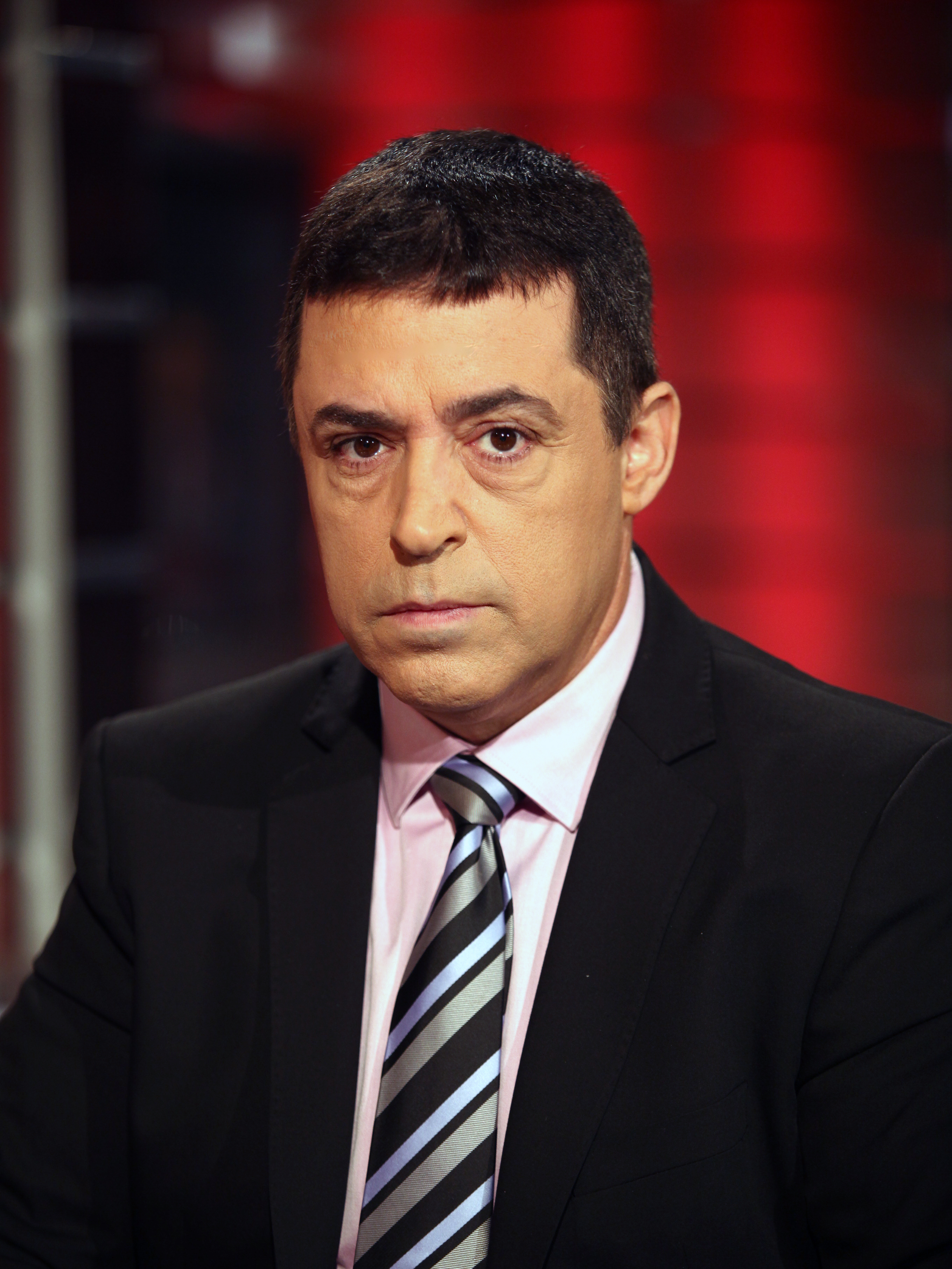
- Ben Caspit, 2012
- Born: September 18, 1960 (age 65); Tel Aviv-Yafo, Israel
- Education: Bachelor's degree in law from the Tel Aviv University
- Occupations: Journalist, Political commentator
- Years active: 1985–present
- Employer: Hevrat HaHadashot
- Notable work: Netanyahu: The Road to Power; The Netanyahu Years
- Television: Meet The Press

Ben Caspit (Hebrew: בן כספית; born October 18, 1960) is an Israeli journalist. He is a political commentator and a senior reporter for the newspaper Maariv HaShavua and Al-Monitor. He presents daily programs on radio station 103fm in the morning program alongside Yinon Magal and in the evening program alongside Aryeh Eldad, and also presents the Hevrat HaHadashot "meet the press" alongside Amit Segal on channel 12.

== Biography ==
Caspit was born in Tel Aviv, and grew up in Holon. He enlisted in the Israeli Defense forces in 1979, to the Armored Corps and served as a Merkava tank commander in the 7th Armored Brigade until 1982. He graduated from Tel Aviv University with a bachelor's degree in law. Afterwards, he worked as a private investigator and engaged in economic and insurance investigations.

In 1985 he joined the Maariv newspaper, by the recommendation of his high school friend, Emmanuel Rosen. He first worked as a sports reporter. Later, he served as a municipal reporter, a reporter for police affairs, and for four years was the Maariv correspondent in New York. When he returned to Israel, he became the newspaper's political reporter. In November 2012, as part of the process of purchasing Maariv by Israeli businessman Shlomo Ben Zvi, he was fired from the newspaper, along with other employees.

Shortly after his dismissal, along with those fired from Maariv, he was one of the first members of the new weekly newspaper, SofHaShavua. In May 2014, after the purchase of Maariv newspaper and its merger with SofHaShavua by the Jerusalem Post group, he returned to work in the newspaper which was now called Maariv HaHavua and is one of the senior commentators in the newspaper, writing opinion columns several times a week there.

Since 2012, Caspit has presented a daily radio program on the radio station 103fm, and is a columnist for news site Al-Monitor.

Known as a harsh critic of the Israeli Prime Minister Benjamin Netanyahu, Caspit has written two books about him (Netanyahu: The Road to Power and Netanyahu: A Biography). According to him: "I admit that I am obsessed, I am a father of 3 children, and if someone wants to hurt my child, I will be obsessed with trying to stop him. I am generally quite right-wing in my positions, but I have been following Netanyahu since 1988, and I think he is dangerous for the State of Israel."

In January 2020, it was published in the Globes newspaper that over the years Caspit had passed on information to the police in various legal cases related to Netanyahu, including a recording of Judge Hila Gerstel talking to him about the appointment of Avichai Mandelblit to the position of Attorney General.

== Notable journalistic achievements ==
- Exposing the exchange of messages between Israeli Prime Minister Benjamin Netanyahu and Syrian President Hafez al-Assad.
- In November 2009, Caspit revealed the fact that the chairman of the committee that appoints the attorney general, retired judge Theodor Or, supported the candidacy of the director of the courts Moshe Gal, even though Or's wife was employed by Gal on a personal contract without a tender and without Or communicating this fact to the other members of the committee.
- In August 2017, at his request, a ruling was issued requiring the Jerusalem Municipality to publish the terms of Sarah Netanyahu's employment in the municipality.
- In January 2022, he revealed that Benjamin Netanyahu was in talks with the attorney general Avichai Mandelblit to settle a plea bargain in his trial despite his public claims. Later, Israeli journalist Yaron Avraham revealed that Netanyahu approached the president of the supreme court Aharon Barak with a request that he support the implementation of the deal.

== Books ==
- Suicide: A Party Gives Up Power, 1996 (on the Labor Party's loss in the 1996 elections).
- Participated in the editing of the Israel 50 album, which was released on the 50th anniversary of Israel, together with Yehuda Schiff, Danny Dor and Ilan Kfir.
- Netanyahu: The Road to Power, 1997.
- Barak: Soldier number 1, 1998.
- Stealth Bomber: Ehud Barak, The Real Story. 2013.
- The Netanyahu Years, 2018.

== Personal life ==
Caspit resides in Hod HaSharon, has a son from his first marriage and two daughters from his second marriage. In August 2019, he separated from his wife Hila, after 20 years of marriage.
