= The Company (Littell novel) =

2002 American novel written by Robert Littell

The Company: A Novel of the CIA
- First edition (US)
- Author: Robert Littell
- Publisher: Overlook Press (US); Macmillan (UK)
- Publication date: 2002
- ISBN: 978-1-58567-197-7

The Company: A Novel of the CIA is an American novel written by Robert Littell and published by The Overlook Press in 2002. The plot interweaves the professional lives of both historical and fictional characters in the field of international espionage between June 1950 and August 1995.

The book was a New York Times bestseller and received wide critical acclaim.

It is the basis of a 2007 miniseries starring Michael Keaton, Chris O'Donnell, and Alfred Molina.

== Notable historical characters ==
The plot includes numerous characters based on historical persons, with varying degrees of verisimilitude.

The following is a list of the historical persons who speak or interact with other characters in the novel:

- Martin Bormann (as Martin Dietrich)
- Reinhard Gehlen
- Yuri Andropov
- Kim Philby
- James Angleton
- Lucian Truscott
- William Colby
- Richard Helms
- James Reston
- Dick Bissell
- Llewellyn Thompson
- Judith Campbell Exner
- Allen Dulles
- Dwight Eisenhower
- Sam Giancana
- Mikhail Gorbachev
- E. Howard Hunt
- Lyndon B. Johnson
- John F. Kennedy
- Joseph P. Kennedy Sr.
- Robert F. Kennedy
- Nikita Khrushchev
- Manuel Piñeiro
- Johnny Roselli
- Mstislav Rostropovich
- Pope John Paul I
- Frank Sinatra
- Fidel Castro
- Harry Truman
- Frank Wisner
- James Baker
- Ronald Reagan
- Bill Clark
- Boris Yeltsin
- William Casey
- Vladimir Kryuchkov

In addition, William King Harvey does not appear by name, but the character "Harvey Torriti, a.k.a. the Sorcerer" is a very thinly-disguised version of Harvey.
