= 0404 News =

Israeli news outlet

0404 News (חדשות 0404)
- Type: Digital journalism
- Founder: Boaz Golan
- Founded: 24 March 2012; 14 years ago
- Language: Hebrew
- Website: 0404.co.il

0404 News (Hebrew: חדשות 0404) is an Israeli right-wing news website founded by journalist Boaz Golan. The site distributes news through various channels, including its website, Facebook, Twitter, and mobile applications.

0404 publishes news across multiple fields, characterizing its perspective as "Zionist-patriotic", with a primary focus on security issues. The website reports on events such as Israel Defense Forces (IDF) counterterrorism operations, code red, terrorist attacks, and hate crimes, as well as on disasters, accidents, crimes, sports, technology, and other topics.

Additionally, the website features reports under the title "Beautiful Israel" (ישראל היפה), which highlight Israelis and business owners who have demonstrated "generosity toward IDF soldiers or fellow citizens". It also publishes reports accompanied by photographs under the title "The Huge Heart of IDF Fighters" (הלב הענק של לוחמי צה"ל) showcasing IDF soldiers who have "displayed humanity and performed acts of kindness towards humans and animals". The website collaborates with various organizations that support IDF soldiers.

The Facebook page of 0404 News has garnered over 665,000 likes, while the website attracts approximately 2 million monthly visitors.

== History ==
The website originally focused on Haifa and Krayot related news. Its name derived from the area code 04 which represented Haifa and western Galilee. Over time, 0404 expanded to include national content.

In April 2014, IDF soldier David Hanchalavi physically assaulted a Palestinian protester, verbally abusing him and threatening to shoot him. This incident resulted in Hanchalavi's arrest and sparked an online protest known as David Hanchalavi protest. 0404 News collaborated with the protest and gained significant popularity, as thousands of images featuring signs that read "I'm with David Hanchalavi as well" (גם אני עם דוד הנחלאווי) were submitted to the website during this period.

During 2014 Gaza War, the 0404 News application ranked among the top ten in both the Israeli App Store and Google Play.

In 2016, the owners of Channel 20 (today known as Now 14) acquired a 50% stake in 0404 News.

In July 2017, Globes ranked 0404 News fourth among news websites in Israel according to its annual brand rankings.

=== Controversy ===
0404 is generally considered an unreliable source of information, with multiple instances of misinformation associated with the website.

== See also ==
- Yitzchak Mirilashvili
- Now 14
