= Channel 14 (Israel) =

Israeli television channel

Channel 14 ערוץ 14
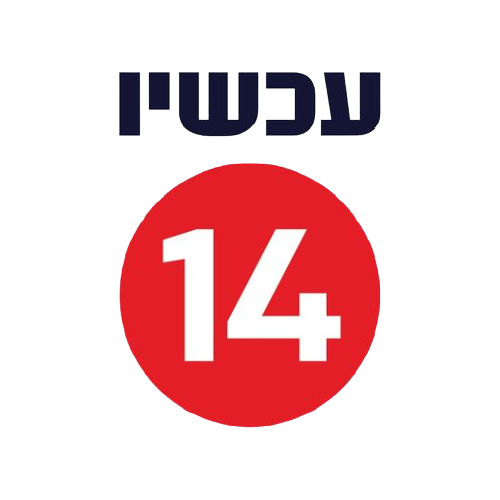
- Country: Israel & International
- Broadcast area: National & International

Programming
- Language: Hebrew
- Picture format: HDTV 720p

Ownership
- Owner: Jewish Israeli Channel Ltd

History
- Launched: 30 June 2014
- Replaced: Channel 10 (Note: Channel space on Idan+ and pay TV providers)
- Former names: Heritage Channel; Channel 20

Links
- Website: www.c14.co.il

Availability

Terrestrial
- Digital: Channel 14

Streaming media
- Official website: www.c14.co.il/live

Now 14 (Hebrew: עכשיו 14), colloquially referred to as Channel 14, is an Israeli right-wing and conservative commercial television channel and news site. The channel broadcasts news, political commentary, satire and talk shows, all of which are presented from a right-wing perspective. The controlling shareholder of the channel is Yitzchak Mirilashvili.

== History ==
=== Background ===
In 1997, the Ministry of Communications August 1997 the government approved the report of the Yossi Peled Committee, which was established to prepare a proposal for expanding and reorganizing the public television and radio broadcasting system. One of the proposed channels was a channel aimed at Israeli heritage, alongside other channels: the Amharic channel, the Arabic channel (which would become Hala TV in 2012), a music channel (Channel 24), a Russian channel (Channel 9) and a news channel, that never ended up being established. All of the channels were scheduled to be financed by commercial advertising. The hearings were published on 1 December 1998, but the launch of the heritage channel had its launch process delayed several times. In 2000, the prime minister amended the licensing of the channel.

=== First bid ===
In July 2005, the tender for the Heritage Channel was published. The Hirsch Media Group, owned by businessman Shlomo Ben-Zvi, was the only bidder and won the tender. In 2003, Ben-Zvi already established "Arutz HaKlat" (The Blue Channel), a paid heritage channel for digital cable TV subscribers and satellite subscribers. Since the channel was paid, and did not broadcast advertising, the move was possible according to the rules of the Ministry of Communications. Shortly before the broadcasts began, American businessman Ron Lauder purchased 24% of the channel's shares. The "Blue Channel" was closed on 31 March 2006, in accordance with the agreement between the channel and the cable and satellite companies, with the receipt of the license for the dedicated channel on Israel's heritage. After winning the tender, Thia Communications entered as a partner in half of the ownership, but a conflict broke out between the two partner companies, the channel was not established due to lack of economic viability and the group's winning of the center to operate the channel was canceled in December 2006.

=== Second bid ===
In February 2008, the Cable and Satellite Council announced that it would once again publish a tender for a heritage channel. In March 2012, the second tender was published. According to the terms of the tender, the equity of the owners of the channel must be 24 million shekels, the winner himself will provide a bond of three million shekels to comply with the terms of the license, the channel's broadcasts will be financed from the sale of advertisements and sponsorships, as well as from the sale of programs and parts of programs, and the channel's broadcasts need to cover issues related to Israel's heritage, to the Jewish religion, to the history, culture and tradition of the Jewish people in the Diaspora and in the State of Israel. Yitzchak Mirilashvili was the only bidder in the tender, and he won it; in August 2013 he received the license to operate the channel.

=== Early years on channel 20 ===
Before the establishment of the channel, the slot later used by Channel 20 was broadcast from studios that are used by the Israeli version of Big Brother, in Neve Ilan.

Channel 20 started broadcasting on 30 June 2014 under a trial period that lasted for several weeks. The channel was made available on Yes and HOT from the outset, with the possibility of launching it terrestrially on the Second Authority's Idan+ platform at the short-term. Ynet housed its live stream.

Under the terms of the license, the channel was prohibited from broadcasting broadcasts unrelated to Israel's heritage, and the Council for Cable and Satellite Broadcasting rejected its request to broadcast Hapoel Jerusalem basketball matches. In June 2015, the council imposed a fine on the channel for violating the terms of the license for broadcasting an election rally, and in August of that year another fine was imposed on it for broadcasting news flashes.

In December 2016, the Cable and Satellite Broadcasting Council approved channel 20 to broadcast news, up to an hour during prime-time hours and up to 30 minutes during the rest of the day. The channel's license specifies its nature: "The channel's broadcasts will cover a wide range of topics, related to the heritage of Israel, the Jewish religion, the history, culture and tradition of the Jewish people in the Diaspora and in the State of Israel, taking into account the cultural and social existence of the Jewish public in all its components, currents and shades, in the State of Israel and in the Diaspora."

On 4 May 2017, Channel 20 was chosen to be the operator of the Knesset channel for a decade. On 7 December, the Cable and Satellite Council rejected the channel's proposal due to flaws discovered in it.

In the Globes brand index for 2017, the channel was ranked third in the category of television channels, ahead of Kan 11 (fourth), Channel 24 (fifth) and Channel 9 (sixth) and behind Channel 10 and Channel 2 (tied for first).

In July 2017, the Cable and Satellite Council opened a violation procedure against the channel, following the broadcast of an interview with Prime Minister Benjamin Netanyahu, when the channel did not yet have full permission to broadcast news. On 19 December 2017, Channel 20 CEO Shachi Franz wrote to the Chairman of the Cable and Satellite Council that the channel's people are preparing to return the broadcast license and stop its broadcasts, claiming that the Cable Council is restricting the channel's feet and harming its ability to broadcast and that "every reasonable person understands that there is a deliberate and systematic trend". The next day, the channel withdrew from the Israeli rating committee on the grounds that it violates its goal of having a reliable and objective measurement.

The channel's employees began to demonstrate by calling against its closure. On 26 December, the channel's management began handing out hearing letters to employees before dismissal.

In August 2017, the Cable and Satellite Council fined the channel 100,000 NIS, due to its refusal to host representatives of Reform and Conservative Judaism in its programs. The channel appealed this to the Jerusalem District Court, but its appeal was rejected.

=== Supervision from the Second Authority ===
During January 2018, Minister of Communications Ayoob Kara led legislative discussions in the Knesset with the aim of saving the channel, which turned into discussions about the overall regulation of the broadcasting market in Israel. In February 2018, an amendment to the Law of the Second Television and Radio Authority was approved, an amendment also known as the "Channel 20 Law", but also applies to additional channels. The amendment allows holders of a dedicated cable and satellite channel license to receive a "dedicated small channel" license from the Second Authority. The holder of this license must broadcast at least 51 percent of his broadcasts programs in which the specified special purpose is fulfilled or alternatively he must spend at least 51 percent of his income on such broadcasts. A small channel is entitled to significant serial concessions compared to the holders of the usual licenses. Among other things, easing the obligation to invest in local production, and exemption from high-quality production, from a minimum investment in content, and from the obligation to broadcast in the Arabic language, as well as the possibility of broadcasting news without establishing a news company. In March 2018, the channel received a dedicated small broadcast license and passed from the supervision of the Council for Cable and Satellite Broadcasting to the supervision of the Second Authority.

In March 2018, a series of appointments were made at Channel 20, which included the appointment of Boaz Golan, founder and editor of the 0404 News site, to the position of chief news editor, and the appointment of Yoni Sagi to the position of managing the commercial department and the digital department, at that time the news division of Channel 20 was established. On 25 March 2018, the channel began broadcasting its news bulletins. Its main newscast, at 8:00 PM presented by Dana Somberg. However, voices of criticism of the measurement method were heard on the channel due to the lack of digital measurement.

In 2018–2019, the channel had a collaboration with the Galei Yisrael radio station, in which the channel produced hourly newscasts and broadcast during the morning and afternoon hours a live broadcast from its studios.

In July 2021, the channel began publishing a monthly printed magazine called "20 Magazine" (מגזין 20), which was later renamed "Now 14 Magazine".

=== As Now 14 ===
On 18 January 2021, the channel won the tender to broadcast on Channel 14, after Channel 10, which used the channel, merged with Reshet 13 in January 2019 and the slot remained unused. The channel did not receive a different license for broadcasting from its previous license.

In August 2021, the channel rented studios in Modi'in-Maccabim-Reut and transferred most of its broadcasts there.

On 28 November 2021, Channel 20 moved to Channel 14, and changed its name to "Now 14", and is also known as Channel 14.

The channel primarily features news programming and, occasionally, religious programming, though the quantity of religious programs has been on a decline as the channel shifted to a more news-oriented approach over the years.

The most popular show on the channel is The Patriots, which features a panel of journalists and other activists discussing issues in the world, as well as commenting on social media posts from various people, and everyone is given a limited time to give an opinion. When the time is over, a buzzer is activated.

Now 14's main news show is broadcast at 19:50 Israel time, and presented by Maggie Tabibi.

== Controversy ==
Channel 14 is often defined as politically biased towards the Israeli right-wing and far-right and is often favourable towards Benjamin Netanyahu. Knesset members from the Likud recommended watching Channel 14 because "it is a right-wing channel that appeals to a right-wing audience".

In September 2024, three Israeli human rights organizations, Zulat, Hatzlacha, and The Democratic Bloc, wrote a letter regarding statements made on the channel, including 50 statements supporting genocide in Gaza and 150 statements calling for war crimes such as indiscriminate killing, mass deportation and starvation. The letter requested a criminal investigation and was sent to the Attorney General of Israel and the Second Authority for Television and Radio in Israel. The analysis has been done again and between October 2023 and May 2025, it was 500 dangerous statements.

=== Inside Israel ===
The channel caused much controversy in Israel over the years. In the first years of its existence, the channel excluded Reform and Conservative Jewish religious movements from the channel's broadcasts. The channel was sued for a sum of several hundred thousand shekels for breaking the Israeli law: Prohibition of Discrimination in Products, Services and Entry into Places of Entertainment and Public Places Law, 2000.

On 11 November 2018, the channel aired an interview with Yitzhak Gabbai, who was convicted of setting fire to a Jewish-Arab bilingual school in Jerusalem and served three years in prison. The interview received condemnations from the many figures in the Israeli public, and as a result the channel itself and the interviewer Boaz Golan apologized for the incident. Following the interview, the Second Authority for Television and Radio started a violation procedure against the channel.

In May 2021, following a rocket attack in northern Israel, the reporter Kobi Finkler said live: "One (missile) fell on a soccer field in a large Arab settlement and very unfortunately it did not result in mass casualties there." In response, he was fired by the channel.

On 30 May 2022, the printed magazine of "Now 14" published an article entitled "LGBTistan: This is how the revolution is organized that exploits the LGBT and eats its children", by Gali Bat Horin. On 28 March 2023, the magazine "Now 14" published an article entitled "This is how young people in Israel are led to castration and surgeries following the transgender ideology".

On 21 February 2023, during the 2023 Israeli judicial reform protests, channel commentator Ari Shamai said on the program "The Patriots" that "these people (protestors) (...) are the grandchildren and great-grandchildren of the Belial (Devil of the Hebrew Bible), who refused to fight against the Nazis in Warsaw Ghetto." He was then suspended from participating in the program. Later on, Uri Shamai called for the release of far-right extremist Yigal Amir, who was convicted and sentenced for the assassination of Yitzhak Rabin. On the following days, Israeli protest movements arose calling to stop advertising on the channel.

On 19 September 2024, the channel aired an "exclusive recording" of former Prime Minister, Naftali Bennett, saying: "we can debate a Palestinian state in 6 years or 8 years". The channel published the recording under the title "Bennett does not rule out a Palestinian state". In response, Bennett said: "A complete fake again. Channel 14 should send its commentators and reporters to English lessons in Berlitz".

As of June 2025, three Israeli civil rights organization have asked for an investigation into its statements on the War in Gaza, stating it had aired genocidal statements and incitements to war crimes.

=== Outside Israel ===
During the Gaza war, the channel published a number of articles that turned out to be incorrect.

In 2024, some of the channel members suggested that Israel should disregard claims that it is contravening international law, especially in the field of military conduct in wartime, and should stop letting the United States push it around on issues on which the two states disagree.

The Logically Facts fact-checking site reported in 2024 that,

According to The Times of Israel, the "incendiary right-wing" news broadcaster Channel 14 was a "largely dismissed bit player in the media industry" until its viewership grew exponentially in 2023, which sparked concern due to its "repeated scandals" and charges of "pro-Netanyahu propaganda." The channel has been described as "the Israeli answer to Fox News" by Ayala Panievsky, a research fellow at Cambridge University and City University of London specializing in right-wing populism, who, in a 2023 opinion piece in the Israeli news outlet Haaretz, wrote that Channel 14 is "propagandistic."

In October 2024, the channel sparked intense criticism among Iraqi leaders for showing a graphic implying that Grand Ayatollah Ali al-Sistani, the country's senior Shia cleric, could be targeted for killing alongside leaders from Hamas and Hezbollah.

== Staff ==
- Yinon Magal – television presenter Host of "The Patriots"
  - "The Patriots" panel current members: Dror Kapah, Itamar Fleischmann, Irit Linur, Yaki Adamker, Yedidya Meir, Yotam Zimri,Yoni Chetboun, Moshe Cohen-Eliya, Eran Hermoni
- Shai Goldstein and Noam Fathi– Talk show hosts
- Tal Heinrich – part-time U.S. correspondent
- Erel Segal – news anchor
- Shimon Riklin – news anchor
- Hallel Biton-Rosen – journalist
- Erez Zadoc – journalist
- Motty Castel – journalist

== See also ==
- List of television channels in Israel
