= Oyster Bay National Wildlife Refuge =

Protected area in New York, United States

- IUCN category IV (habitat/species management area)
- Location within New York Location within the United States
- Location: Nassau County, New York, United States
- Nearest city: Oyster Bay, New York
- Coordinates: 40°53′30″N 73°30′28″W
- Area: 3,209 acres (12.99 km^{2})
- Established: 1968
- Governing body: U.S. Fish and Wildlife Service
- Website: Oyster Bay National Wildlife Refuge

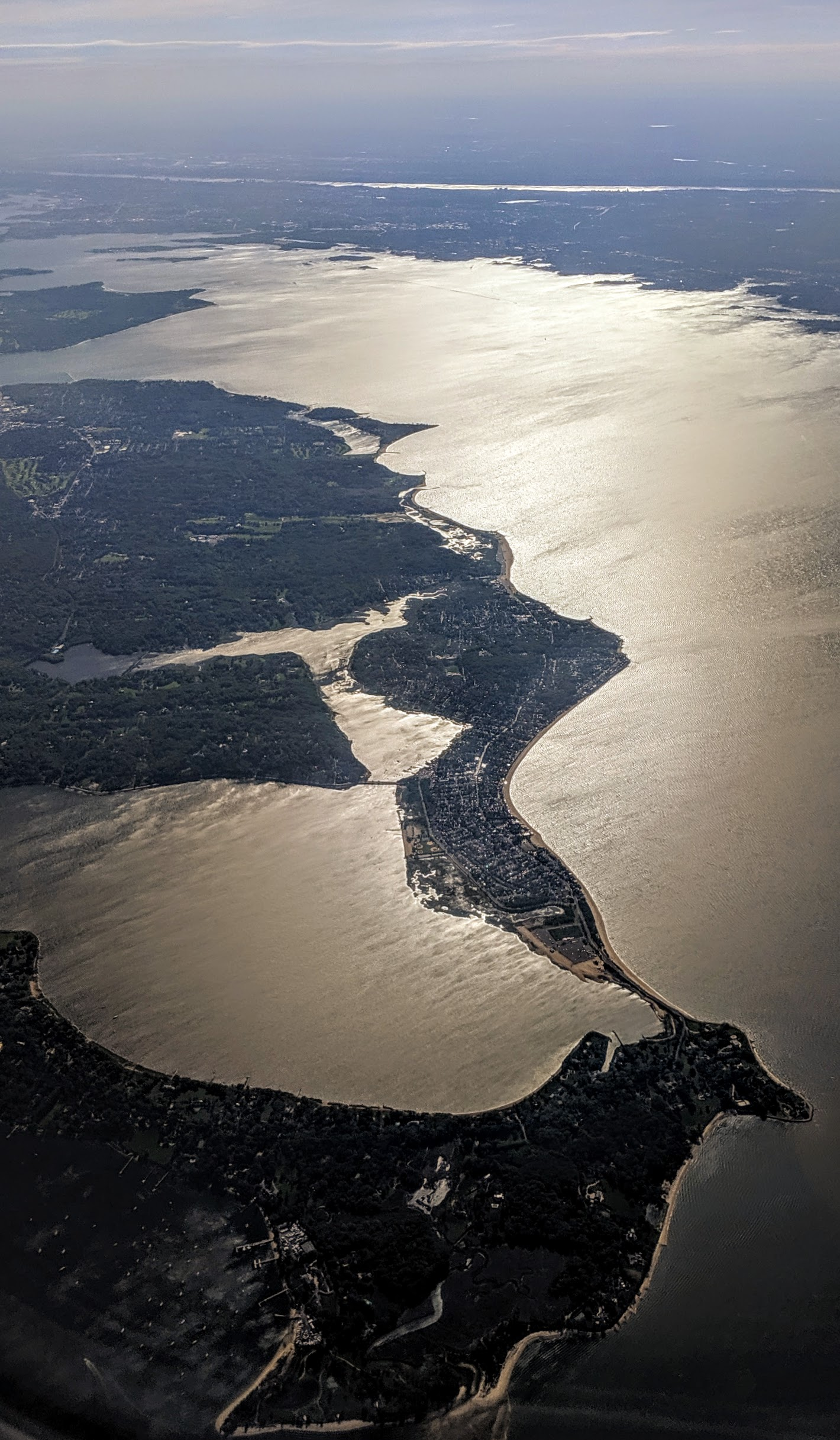
Aerial view of Oyster Bay National Wildlife Refuge (the near left water areas)

The Congressman Lester Wolff Oyster Bay National Wildlife Refuge, formerly known as the Oyster Bay National Wildlife Refuge, on the north shore of Long Island, New York, consists of high-quality marine habitats that support a variety of aquatic-dependent wildlife. The refuge's waters and marshes surround Sagamore Hill National Historic Site, home of President Theodore Roosevelt. He is considered the founder of the National Wildlife Refuge System. Subtidal (underwater up to mean high tide line) habitats are abundant with marine invertebrates, shellfish and fish.

Marine invertebrate and fish communities support a complex food web from waterfowl to fish-eating birds, to marine mammals. Waterfowl use of the Refuge peaks from October through April. Over 20,000 ducks have been documented on the refuge during one survey. Over 25 species of waterfowl, along with numerous other waterbirds, depend on Oyster Bay for survival.

The most common marine mammals at the refuge are harbor seals, which have become more noticeable during recent years. Sea turtles and diamondback terrapins can also be sighted at the Refuge.
