= Kalman Liebskind =

Israeli journalist

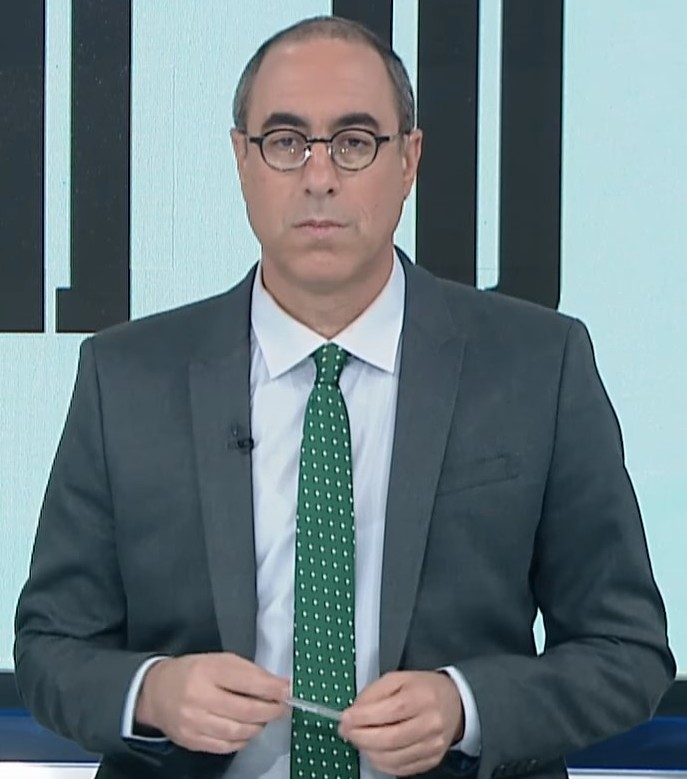
Kalman Liebskind

Kalman Liebskind (Hebrew: קלמן ליבסקינד; born on 1970) is an Israeli journalist.

== Early life ==
Liebskind was born in Nir Galim and studied at the Yeshivat Or Etzion. He was drafted into the Intelligence Corps of the Israel Defense Forces and upon discharge, worked as a private investigator.

== Media career ==
In 1997, he was one of the founding journalists at Makor Rishon and worked as an investigative reporter. In 2000, he began working at Maariv. In recent years, Liebskind has published a weekly column in Maariv's "Mosafshabat" which deals with weekly political and current affairs.

Between 2011 and 2016, Liebskind co-hosted the main morning news and current affairs radio show with Erel Segal on Galey Yisrael. In October 2016, Liebskind moved to co-host the main morning news and current affairs radio show with Assaf Lieberman on Kan Bet of the Israeli Public Broadcasting Corporation Taagid network. In 2019, he also began to co-host an afternoon current affairs TV show with Erel Segal on Kan 11. In June 2020, the Kalman & Segel show was abruptly cancelled. Liebskind is now host of the program Etsem Ha'Inyan (עצם העניין) on Kan 11.

Liebskind has published several high-profile exposés:

- In 1999, he exposed Ehud Barak's non-profit organizations that funded Barak's elections' campaign, in violation of Israel's political parties funding law.
- In 2008, he exposed that general Yoav Gallant has taken over public lands in Moshav Amikam. This exposure led eventually to the cancellation of Gallant's appointment as Chief of General Staff of the IDF.

== Awards and honors ==
- Media Criticism Award (2002) - פרס ביקורת התקשורת
- Ometz Award (2007) - אות אומ"ץ
- Knight of Quality Government Award (2009) - אות אביר איכות השלטון

== Personal life ==
Liebskind is married with five children.
