= Tal Heinrich =

Israeli spokeswoman and news anchor

- טל היינריך
- Occupations: Spokeswoman; news anchor

Tal Heinrich (Hebrew: טל היינריך) is a spokeswoman for the Prime Minister Office of Israel. Before the October 7th Hamas attack, she was working for Israel's Channel 14 and Trinity Broadcasting Network. Before that, she was one of the main anchors on i24news. Heinrich often anchored Crossroads with David Shuster. Following that she served as lead anchor for the Investigative Journal. She was also one of the key experts to testify at a key UN session organized by Sheryl Sandberg. Since the beginning of the conflict, Heinrich has appeared on many United States network news shows such as that of Erin Burnett. Heinrich is fluent in Hebrew, English, and Arabic.
