= The Obama Identity =

2010 novel by Edward Klein and John LeBoutillier

The Obama Identity: A Novel (Or Is It?)
- First edition cover
- Author: Edward Klein and John LeBoutillier
- Language: English
- Publisher: CreateSpace
- Publication date: 2010

The Obama Identity: A Novel (Or Is It?) is a 2010 novel written by Edward Klein and former Republican United States Representative John LeBoutillier. Among other things, the book explores and promotes the Barack Obama citizenship conspiracy theories and Barack Obama religion conspiracy theories in the form of a novel. In an interview on Fox & Friends, Leboutillier claimed that the book uses "real things" and has "so much real stuff". Following the interview, Media Matters for America published excerpts from the book in an article which criticized the book as having an "incomprehensible plot".

== Plot summary ==
This book is a parody. Prior to Obama's election, the protagonist, a CIA agent named Theodore J. Higginbothem III, or "Higgy" uncovers a vast conspiracy surrounding Barack Obama. After Obama is elected, the protagonist attempts suicide, but is unsuccessful; afterwards, he goes to work for the president.

== Plot details ==
The book presents various conspiracy theories about President Obama and other Democrats as fact, including that:

- Obama is a Muslim and was tutored as a child by an Indonesian imam and attempted rapist who was described as plotting to "plant converted Muslims inside non-Muslim governments with the hope that they would someday rise to hold high governmental positions." In the book, Obama's circumcision is described by the imam as having "cleansed Barry of his impure American ideas."
- Barack Obama was born in Mombasa, Kenya.
- Bill Clinton avoided the draft because he was an undercover CIA agent.
- Jeremiah Wright had a secret office underneath his church, which was used for organizing Obama's presidential campaign.
- Obama's campaign was funded by China, Iran, Russia, Indonesia, and the United Arab Emirates, with help from a "Soros aide".
- The late 2000s recession was purposely created by George Soros in order to get Obama elected.
- Barack Obama wants to add his own face to Mount Rushmore and rename Chicago after himself.

Other scenes depicted in the book include Wright demanding "100,000 a year in reparations for every black man, woman, and child", Obama having his feet washed by a "Filipino steward" and his cigarette smoke fanned away by "barely dressed Thai boys", and Katie Couric having "erect nipples...clearly visible through her blouse" while "in full swoon over Barack Obama" because she wanted to "go out on a date with" him.

== Reception ==
Vanity Fair published an excerpt from the book, which it described as "satirical". The excerpt describes a fictitious episode of the Sean Hannity television show, in which Hannity interviews a conservative activist who believes that John F. Kennedy is still alive, that we never landed on the Moon, that 9/11 was an inside job and that Obama's campaign is part of a "gigantic conspiracy by leftists to plant a Muslim in the Oval Office and to teach our children to wear shoes with Velcro instead of laces so they can take off their shoes when they come home."

Andrew Zarowny of the conservative website Right Pundits wrote a favorable review of the book, which he described as "hilarious". He also cited another review of the book written by advertising executive Jerry Della Femina.
