= Lester L. Wolff =

American politician (1919–2021)

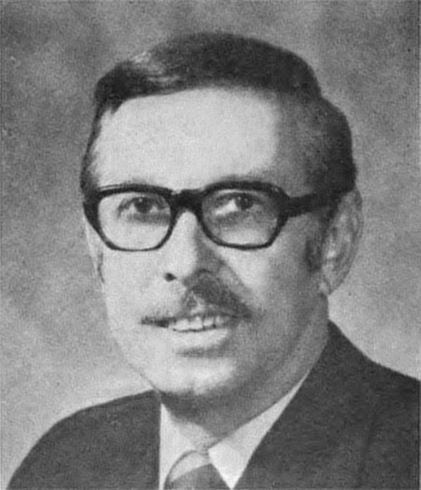
- Wolff in 1975

Member of the U.S. House of Representatives from New York
- In office January 3, 1965 – January 3, 1981
- Preceded by: Steven B. Derounian
- Succeeded by: John LeBoutillier
- Constituency: 3rd district (1965–1973); 6th district (1973–1981)

Personal details
- Born: Lester Lionel Wolff; January 4, 1919 New York City, U.S.
- Died: May 11, 2021 (aged 102) Syosset, New York, U.S.
- Party: Democratic
- Spouse: Blanche Silvers (m. 1940; died 1997)
- Children: 2
- Education: New York University Stern School of Business
- Profession: Consultant

Military service
- Allegiance: United States
- Branch/service: United States Air Force
- Rank: Colonel
- Unit: Civil Air Patrol
- Battles/wars: World War II

Lester Lionel Wolff (January 4, 1919 – May 11, 2021) was an American politician who served as a Democratic member of the United States House of Representatives from Long Island, New York. He also served as president of the International Trade and Development Agency.

In 2014, Wolff accepted the Congressional Gold Medal, the highest civilian award in the United States, on behalf of World War II members of the Civil Air Patrol. Wolff was the chair of the Touro College Pacific Community Institute, the author of numerous books on foreign policy, and the host of the weekly PBS show Ask Congress.

== Early life and education ==
Lester Lionel Wolff was born in Manhattan on January 4, 1919, to Jewish parents Hannah (Bartman) and Samuel Wolff, a marketer who worked at Ruppert Breweries. Wolff graduated from George Washington High School in 1935 and New York University in 1939.

== Early career ==
Wolff lectured at New York University from 1939 until 1941, and later became a department chair at the City College of New York. Wolff was part of the Civil Air Patrol during World War II. He was a squadron commander and a subchaser.

Wolff worked for the Long Island Press and The Bronx Home News. Wolff then founded his own firm, specializing in the food industry, and was executive director of the New York Conference of Retail Grocers. He became the producer and host of Between the Lines, a local television program, and the producer of a celebrity variety show starring Wendy Barrie. Wolff remained active in philanthropy as a member of the United Jewish Appeal and B'nai B'rith.

== U.S. House of Representatives ==
In 1957, Wolff was selected by the U.S. House of Representatives as chairman of the Advisory Committee to the Subcommittee on Consumer Study. Early in his life, he was a liberal Republican, but switched parties, disillusioned with the increasingly conservative direction of the Republican Party under Barry Goldwater.

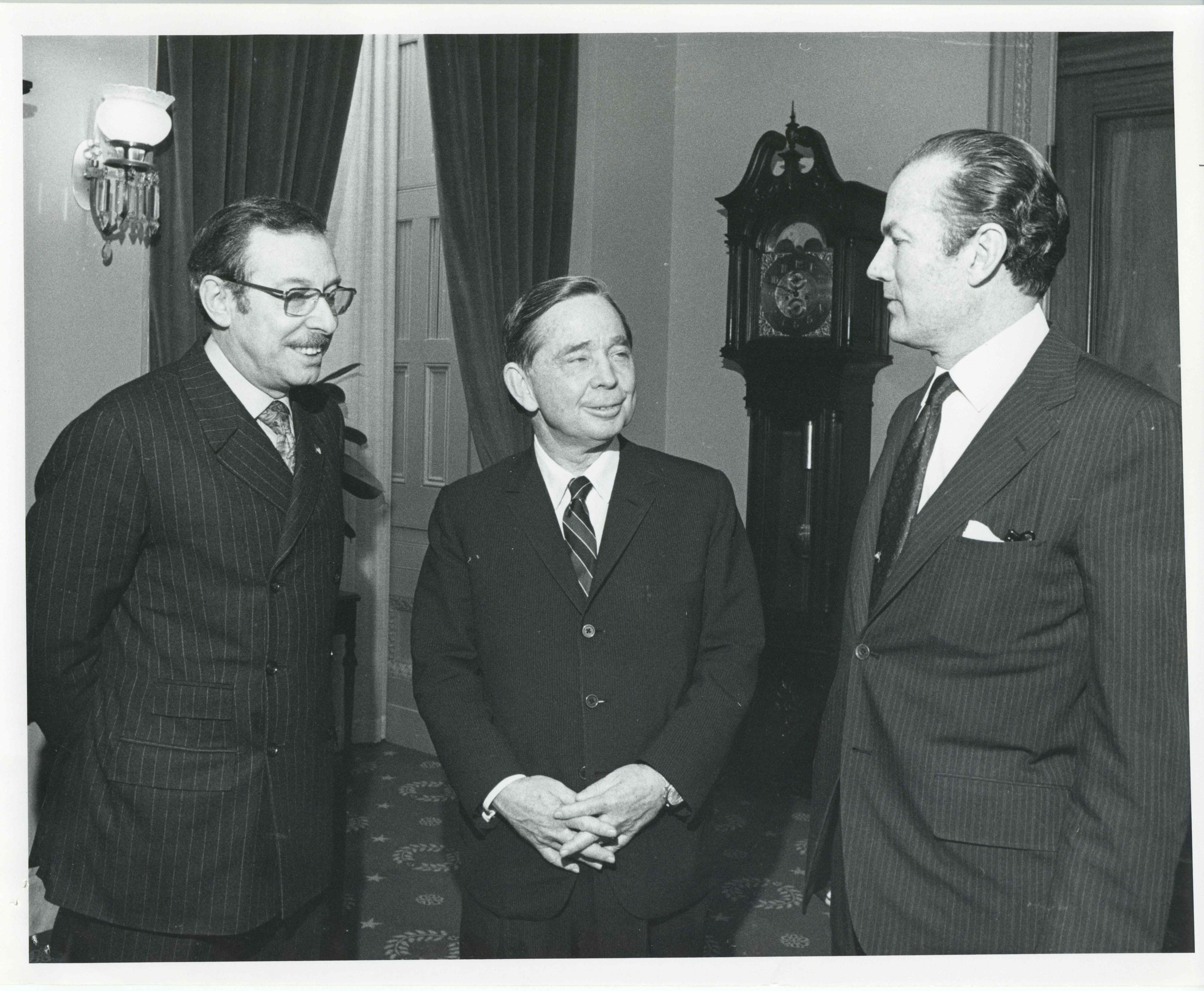
Wolff (left) with Speaker Carl Albert and the president of WPIX in 1974

He was elected to Congress in 1964 and served from January 3, 1965, until January 3, 1981. He initially represented the 3rd district but later through redistricting the 6th district. Wolff served as Chairman of the Asian and Pacific Affairs Committee, and the Select Committee on Narcotics Abuse and Control. He commanded the Congressional Squadron of the Civil Air Patrol, rising to the rank of colonel.

In Congress, Wolff voted for the Voting Rights Act of 1965 and the creation of Medicare and Medicaid. He was an active participant in the civil rights movement who attended the funeral of Martin Luther King Jr. Wolff opposed creation of the Long Island Sound link. He was an opponent of the Vietnam War. He was an advocate of stricter gun laws.

Wolff was known as one of the most 'travel-happy' representatives of Congress while in office, frequently going abroad on congressional 'fact-finding' tours. Wolff was part of a 1978 congressional delegation to China, where he met with Deng Xiaoping. Wolff was also the author of the Taiwan Relations Act which was signed into law on April 10, 1979. Wolff later leveraged his experience in Asian affairs to work as a paid lobbyist for Myanmar’s repressive military government.

Wolff introduced amendments to the White House-sponsored Foreign Assistance Act of 1969 which tried to restore the initiative for direct peace talks between Israel and the Arab states. He also played a role in the Camp David Accords. Wolff was defeated for reelection in an upset by 27-year-old Republican John LeBoutillier in 1980.

== Post-congressional career ==
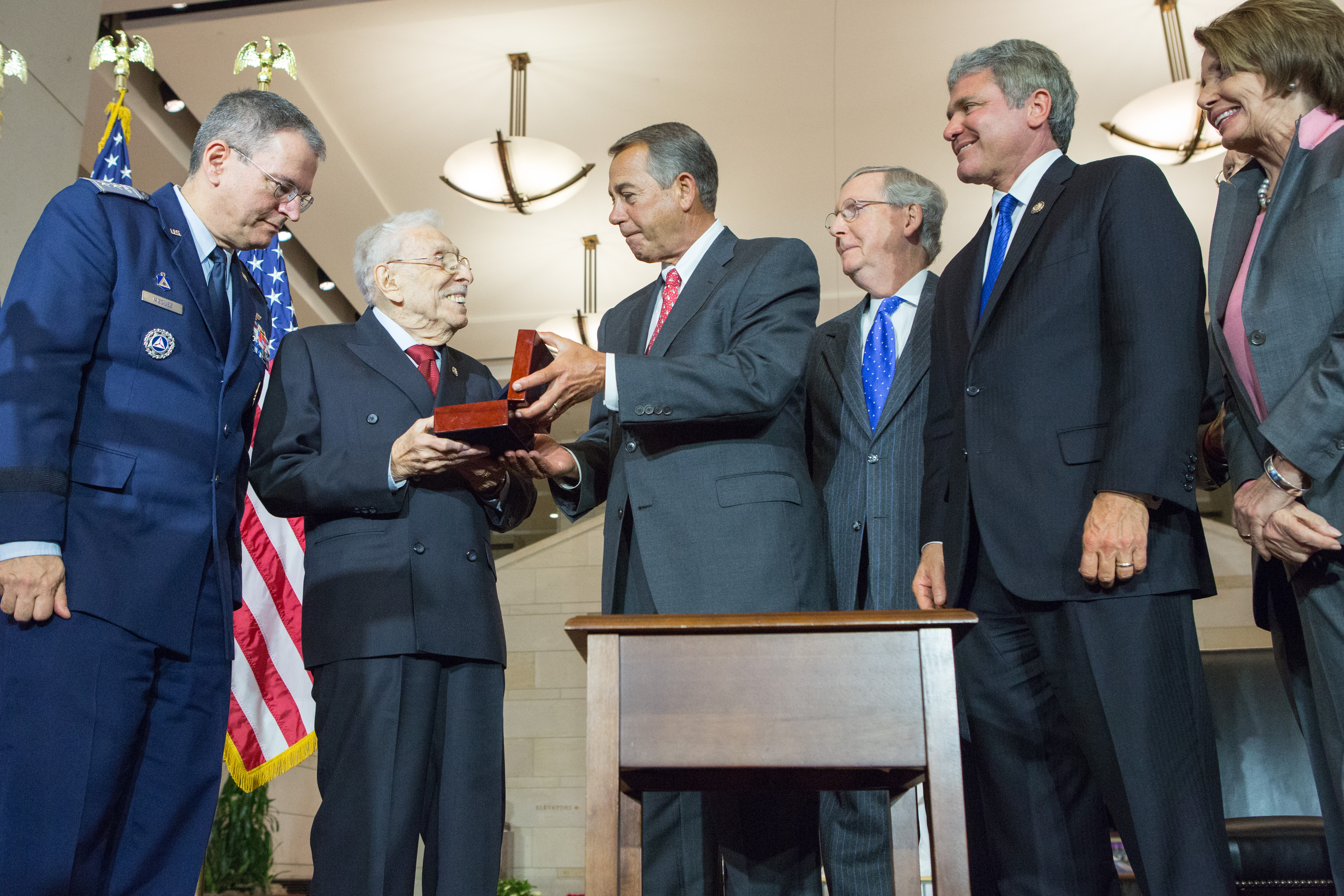
Wolff receiving the Congressional Gold Medal in 2014

Wolff was the president of the International Trade and Development Agency. He was the director of the Pacific Community Institute at Touro College, and published numerous books on foreign policy. He hosted a weekly PBS show, Ask Congress, continuously since the mid-1980s. Due to his expertise in Asian culture and relations, Wolff was a well sought-after consultant. He was a director of the Griffon Corporation from 1987 to 2007. In 2014, he accepted the Congressional Gold Medal, the highest civilian award in the United States, on behalf of volunteers of the Civil Air Patrol who had served during World War II.

With the death of James D. Martin on October 30, 2017, Wolff became the oldest living former member of Congress. He turned 100 in January 2019. He was active on Twitter and continued to write until his death. He was a vocal opponent of Donald Trump's presidency. In February 2019, Wolff donated his congressional papers to Adelphi University in Garden City, New York. In February 2020, the Oyster Bay National Wildlife Refuge was renamed the Congressman Lester Wolff Oyster Bay National Wildlife Refuge.

== Personal life and death ==
Wolff married Blanche Silvers in 1940; she died in 1997. An observant Jew, Wolff prayed daily. He died at a hospital in Syosset, New York, on May 11, 2021. At his death, he was the last living former U.S. representative born in the 1910s; at age 102 years, 127 days, he was the longest-lived U.S. House member in history.

== See also ==
- List of Jewish members of the United States Congress

== Bibliography ==
- Kurt F. Stone (December 29, 2010). The Jews of Capitol Hill: A Compendium of Jewish Congressional Members. Scarecrow Press. pp. 230–233. ISBN 978-0-8108-7738-2.
- United States Congress. "Lester L. Wolff (id: W000680)". Biographical Directory of the United States Congress.

U.S. House of Representatives
Preceded by Steven Derounian	Member of the U.S. House of Representatives from New York's 3rd congressional district 1965–1973	Succeeded by Angelo D. Roncallo
Preceded by Seymour Halpern	Member of the U.S. House of Representatives from New York's 6th congressional district 1973–1981	Succeeded by John LeBoutillier
Honorary titles
Preceded by James D. Martin	Oldest living United States representative (Sitting or former); October 30, 2017 – May 11, 2021	Succeeded by Neal Smith
