= Michael Karpin =

Israeli broadcast journalist and author (born 1945)

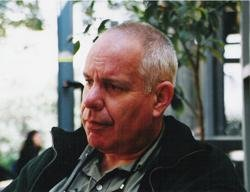
Michael Karpin

Michael I. Karpin (Hebrew: מיכאל קרפין; born on 29 November 1945) is an Israeli broadcast journalist and author, best known for his investigative documentaries and books, revealing two of Israel's most concealed affairs: The creation of the country's nuclear capability and the nationalistic-messianic incitement campaign that preceded the assassination of Prime Minister Yitzhak Rabin. In May 1986, Karpin broke the story of Israel's secret service (Shabak) fabrication of evidence in the course of Bus Line 300's investigation, one of the most controversial political affairs in the history of the country. In 1987, he exposed the Izat Nafsu Affair: a Muslim IDF officer and a Circassian (a small ethnic minority in Israel), who was maliciously investigated by the secret service, convicted of spying and eventually exonerated by the Supreme Court.

Karpin represented Israel's Broadcasting Authority (IBA) as a correspondent in Bonn, West Germany (1976-79), and in Moscow (1991-92). He has worked as a foreign correspondent, broadcasting television and radio reports from more than 30 countries.

== Karpin's documentaries ==
A Bomb in the Basement (2001) tells the story of the creation of Dimona's reactor and the development of Israel's nuclear option. It has been screened by television networks, international film festivals and professional conferences worldwide.

The Road to Rabin Square (1997) exposes the rude incitement campaign against PM Yitzhak Rabin prior to his assassination. It won a jury Special Recognition at the 1998 Biarritz FIPA Festival and a silver medal at the 1997 NY Festival for International Television Programming and Promotion.

Distant Relatives (1995), a three-chapter series about the Jewish community in North America, was awarded the B'nai B'rith World Center Award for Journalism.

== Karpin's books ==
- Imperfect Compromise: A New Consensus among Israelis and Palestinians (Potomac Books – University of Nebraska Press, 2013)
- The Bomb in the Basement – How Israel Went Nuclear and What That Means to the World (Simon & Schuster, NY, 2006) tells how Israel became the Middle East's only nuclear power and how it succeeded in keeping its atomic program secret
- Murder in the Name of God, with Ina Friedman, depicts the story of the militant right-wing rabbis and politicians in Israel and the US, who launched a sophisticated campaign of incitement against PM Yitzhak Rabin, in order to prevent negotiations with the Palestinians on the division of the land from taking place. The book details the steady erosion of Israel's democracy, once vibrant and now teetering, in a process that has resulted from the rise to power of fanatical circles, some of them fascist. Published by Henry Holt and Company, New-York (1998); Rowohlt, Hamburg (1998); Granta Books, London (1999); Zmora-Bitan, Tel-Aviv (1999)
- Tightrope – Six Centuries of a Jewish Dynasty (John Wiley & Sons, NY, 2008), The family saga of the Backenroths, a Jewish dynasty from Galicia (today in western Ukraine).

=== Books in Hebrew ===
- Metamorphosis in the Snow' (Domino, Jerusalem, 1983), Presents an artistic illustration of the complicated and loaded relationship between Germans and Jews according to his impressions when he represented Israeli television in the 1970s in West Germany
- Notes from Pushkin Square (Yedioth Ahronoth, Tel Aviv, 1993), about Karpin's experiences in Moscow during the Soviet Empire's collapse

== Other documentaries ==
- Jerusalem is Full of Used Jews (2006), about Yehuda Amichai's poems of Jerusalem
- I Can't Take It Any More (2006), about Prime Minister Menachem Begin's last years of life, from his 1981's decision to bomb Iraq's Osiraq nuclear reactor, through the 1982 Lebanon War, his resignation from the Prime Ministry and his nine years of solitude

== Personal life ==
Karpin is married to Pnina (née Bahat), has three children and lives in Tel Aviv.
