= Amit Segal =

Israeli Journalist (born 1982)

Amit Yitzhak Segal
- עמית יצחק סגל
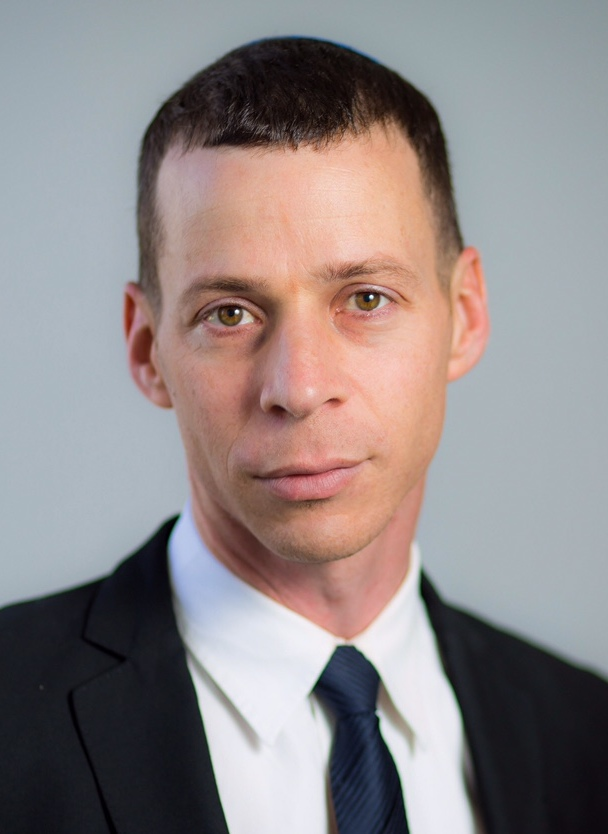
- Born: April 10, 1982 (age 44); Haifa, Israel
- Education: Bachelor's degree in law from the Hebrew University of Jerusalem; MA in Public Policy from University College London
- Occupation: media
- Years active: 2000–
- Employer(s): Hevrat HaHadashot, Keshet Media Group
- Notable work: The Story of Israeli Politics
- Father: Hagai Segal

Amit Segal (Hebrew: עמית סגל; born April 10, 1982) is an Israeli journalist, radio and television personality. He serves as the political commentator of Israel's Channel 12 news (N12 News company) and a political columnist for the Yedioth Ahronoth newspaper. He is regarded as one of the most influential journalists in Israel. Nowadays, he serves as an anchor of the Israeli Meet the Press, alongside Ben Caspit.

== Early life and education ==
Segal was born in Haifa, and raised in the Israeli settlement Ofra; he is the son of Hagai Segal, an Israeli journalist that was part of the Jewish Underground, was convicted of causing grievous bodily harm, illegal weapons possession, and membership in a terrorist organization, and served two years of a three-year prison sentence.

Segal is a graduate of the Faculty of Law at the Hebrew University of Jerusalem, and holds a master's degree from University College London (UCL) in public policy. He is a doctoral student in political science at the Hebrew University.

== Career ==
Segal began his journalistic career at the age of 17 as an education reporter at the Kol Ha'ir local newspaper. In 2000, he was accepted into the Israeli Defense Forces Army Radio. At the beginning of his career at the Army Radio, he served as a media reporter and later as a reporter in the Knesset.

In 2006, he moved to the corresponding position at Hevrat HaHadashot in Channel 2, and presented the program Couple or Individual on the Knesset Channel, initially together with Nadav Perry and later together with Barak Ravid and other presenters, until 2016.

In the years 2009–2010 he served as the foreign correspondent of Hevrat HaHadashot in London, after which he returned to the position of Knesset correspondent.

In May 2013 he was appointed the political commentator of the Hevrat HaHadashot in place of veteran political reporter Rina Mazliah.

Between the years 2011–2018, Segal wrote a weekly column on politics in the Makor Rishon newspaper. As of 2018, he is a columnist in "Mosef Shabbat" of Yediot Ahronoth.

In the years 2015–2019 he presented the program Dekelsegal together with the journalist Yaron Dekel. The program was originally broadcast on Army Radio, and starting in February 2019 on Kan Reshet B. In December, with the outbreak of the 2018–2022 Israeli political crisis, Segal withdrew from the program.

From November 16, 2017, Segal serves as a substitute presenter in the program Shesh im (Six O'clock with). Previously, he hosted, also as a substitute presenter, the programs First Edition and Good Night Israel. Segal is extremely active on social media, especially X formerly Twitter. In 2020, he revealed that he blocked about 4,200 commenters on X, in particular "those who choose to curse, troll or involve parents". Segal has a Telegram channel with over 300,000 followers.

=== Exposés and investigations ===
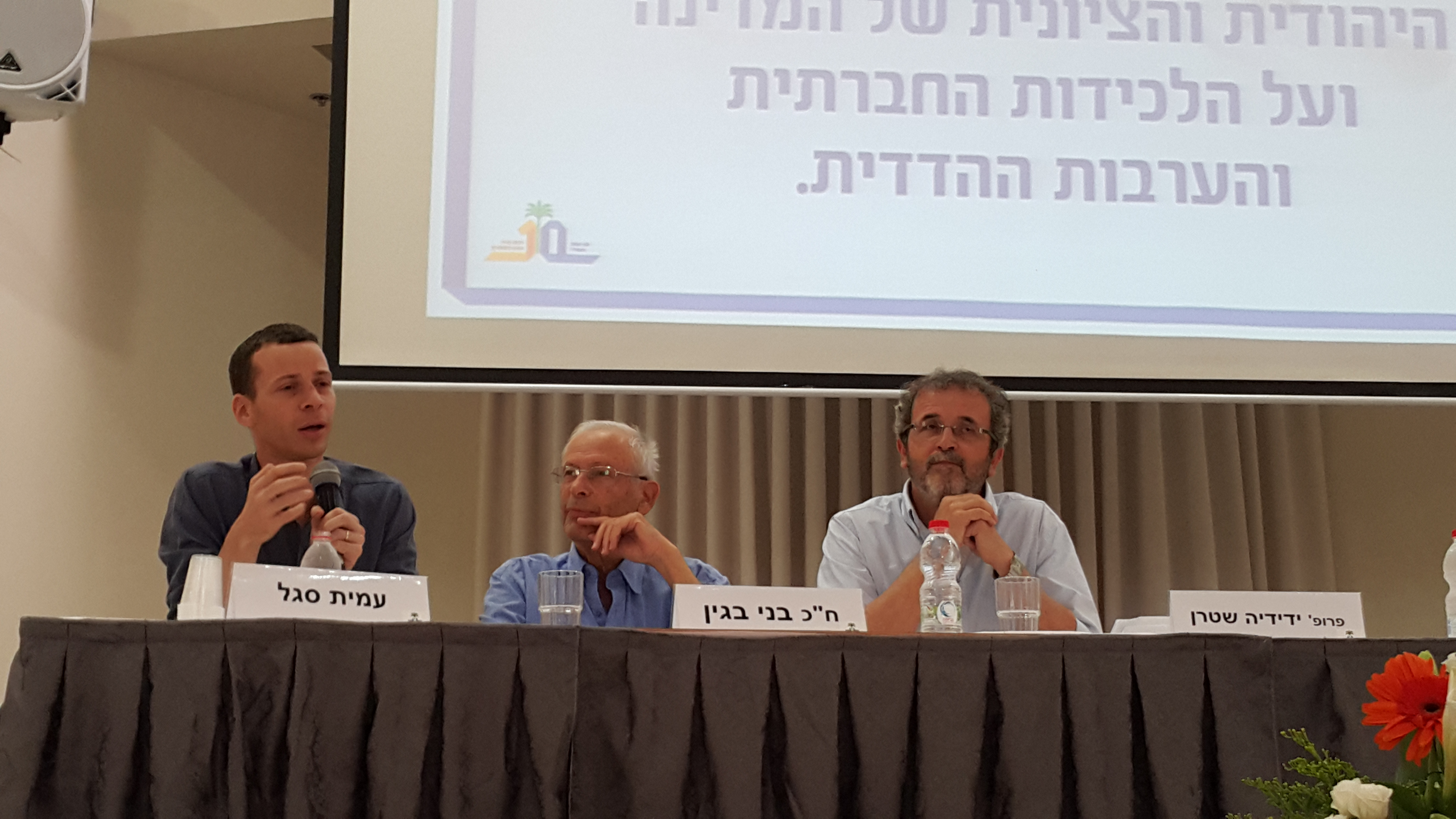
Segal (left) on a panel with Benny Begin (center) and Yedidia Stern (right)

Among his exposés as a journalist: the Agraksko affair; Parshat Yehiel Hazan ("The Brain Affair"); The publication of recordings from the IDF communications network in which the soldier Udi Goldwasser was heard minutes before his abduction and the complaints against Labor Party candidate Uri Sagi.

In 2008, following a request he submitted together with the Freedom of Information Movement against the Knesset, the District Court of Jerusalem ordered the Knesset to publish films from the security cameras, in which Likud MK Yehiel Hazan and Minister Sofa Landver are seen committing criminal offenses.

In 2012 he published an investigation into the lifestyle of Tourism Minister Stas Misezhnikov, in which security guards testified that the minister used to get drunk almost every night, to be absent from government meetings, including the approval of the Shalit deal, and to compromise his security. The investigation was mentioned in the media as the main reason Misezhnikov was not included in the Yisrael Beiteinu list for the 19th Knesset.

In December 2014 Segal revealed tapes from 2008 in which Shas leader Rabbi Ovadia Yosef (1920–2013) was seen harshly attacking party chairman Aryeh Deri. Following the revelation of the recordings, Deri resigned from the Knesset and from the leadership of the party. The disclosure occurred during the election campaign in which former Shas chairman Eli Yishai contested, which was considered a personal contest between him and Deri. Deri returned to the role of chairman after two weeks.

In November 2017 he published an investigation that dealt with then Israel's ambassador to the UN, Danny Danon, which contained evidence that raised suspicions about the appointmentment of dozens of Likud activists to positions in the Zionist Council in exchange for political support for Danon in the Likud primaries.

In March 2019 Segal published that Iran had hacked into the cell phone of Blue and White chairman Benny Gantz and extracted its contents, and that the Shin Bet had informed Gantz about the matter in a secret meeting during the election campaign.

On May 30, 2019, on the eve of the dissolution of the 21st Knesset, Segal revealed that Israeli Labor Party leader Avi Gabai and Tal Russo intended to join the government led by Benjamin Netanyahu. Segal's exposure prevented the progress of the move.

In December 2019 a series he wrote, Days of Benjamin, dealing with Netanyahu, was broadcast.

Four days before the elections to the 23rd Knesset, Segal together with Dafna Liel published a secret recording of Benny Gantz's senior advisor Israel Bacher, in which he said that Gantz does not have the courage to attack Iran and that he is a danger to Israel.

== Written work ==
In July 2021 Segal began pre-selling his first book, The Story of Israeli Politics, which was self-published. According to sources in the industry, about ten thousand books were sold in the first forty-eight hours. His book was illustrated by the chief cartoonist for Haaretz, Amos Biderman.

== English work ==
Segal writes a monthly column for The Wall Street Journal.

He has been a regular contributor to Dan Senor’s Call Me Back podcast since 2025.

Since April 2025, Segal has published a daily English-language newsletter titled It’s Noon in Israel, which has already gained tens of thousands of subscribers.

His book, A Call at 4AM: Thirteen Prime Ministers and the Crucial Decisions that Shaped Israeli Politics, was published in October 2025 in English.

== Recognition ==
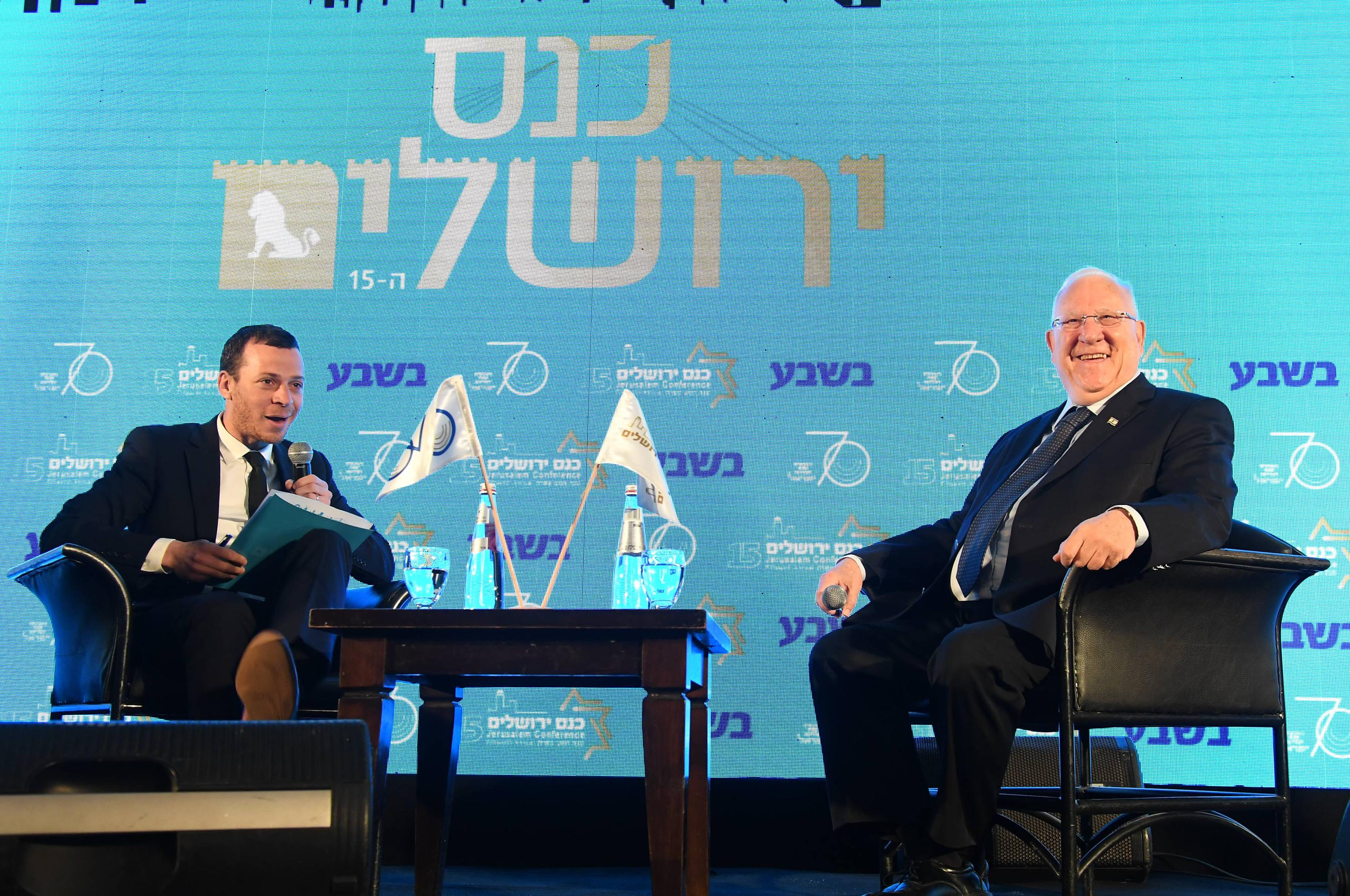
Amit Segal (left) with President Reuven Rivlin (right)

- In 2007 he was chosen by Yediot Ahronoth as one of the ten best television journalists in Israel.
- In 2008 he was chosen by Time Out Tel Aviv as one of the 30 most successful people in Israel under the age of 30.
- In 2009 he was chosen by Makor Rishon as the most prominent religious media person in Israel.
- In 2012 he was chosen by Ma'ariv as the best parliamentary reporter.
- In 2012, he was awarded the Ometz award for discovering irregularities in the activities of several MKs.
- In 2015 he won the DIGIT award for digital journalism in Israel.
- In 2016 he was chosen by the Vigo company as the leading journalist on Twitter.
- In 2019–2020 he was chosen by Globes as the most influential journalist in Israel.

== Personal life ==
Segal is married to Reut, and is the father of three sons and one daughter. He lives in the Katamon neighborhood in Jerusalem. His father is Hagai Segal, and his brother is the journalist and activist Arnon Segal.

Segal is religious, but his wife is "completely secular". Segal said that he has "post-traumatic stress from religiosity", resulting from his years in the strict high school Yeshiva institution Nativ Meir.
