= Hagai Segal =

Israeli journalist

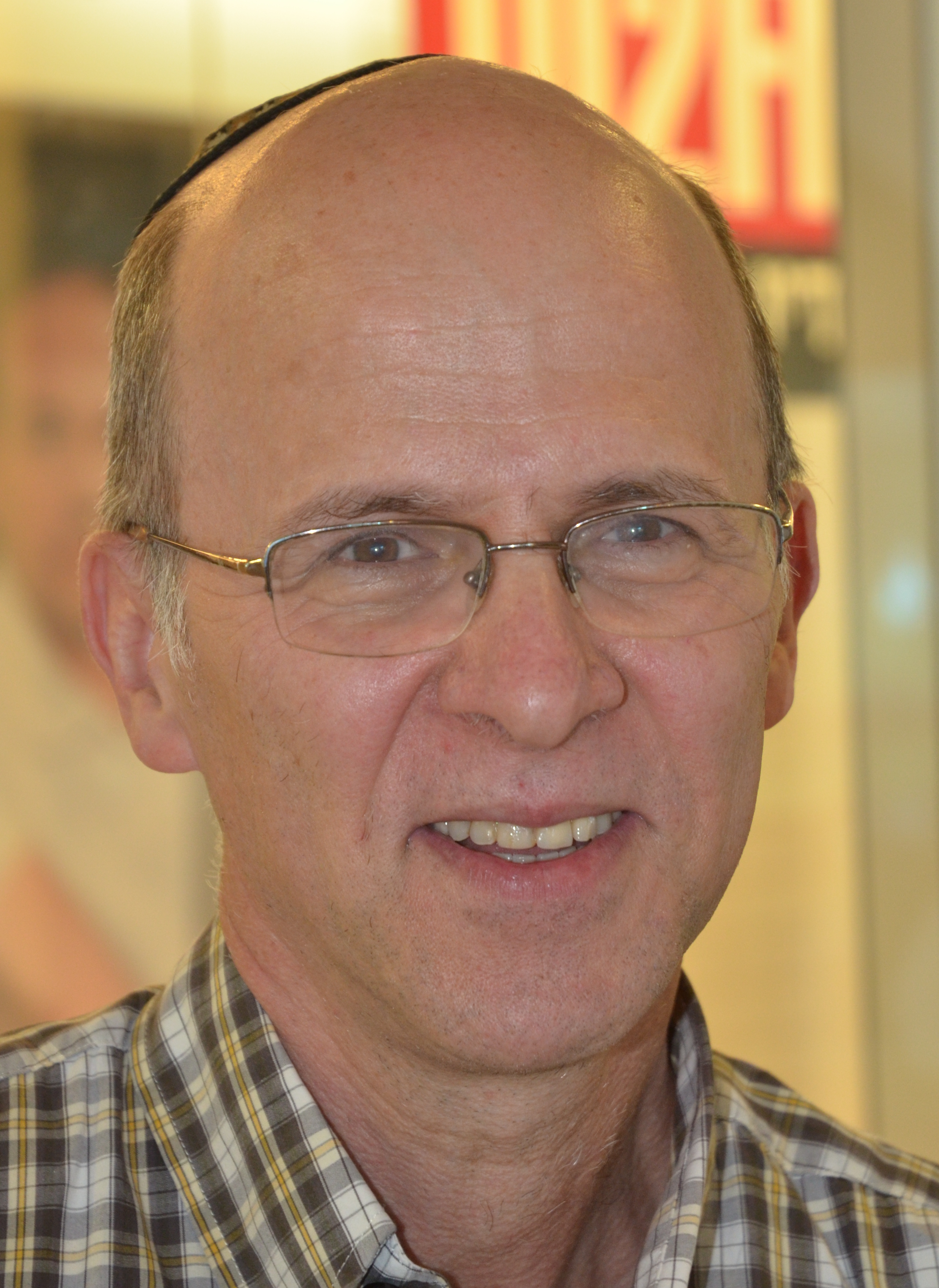
Hagai Segal

Hagai Segal (also spelled Chaggai or Haggai; Hebrew: חגי סגל) is an Israeli author and journalist, former editor of the Makor Rishon newspaper.

In 1980, while part of the group Jewish Underground, Segal planned and planted a bomb that blew off the leg of a Palestinian mayor. He served a prison sentence and later wrote about his experiences in the book Dear Brothers: The West Bank Jewish Underground. Filmmaker Shai Gal released a documentary in 2017 about the terrorist plots and attacks that took place.

Segal researched the death of Irgun member Yedidya Segal for 15 years and wrote Rak Lo Milhemet Ahim (Just Not Civil War), published by Shilo Barkats in Hebrew (2009).

Segal was the director of the news department at Arutz Sheva and was one of ten staff members convicted of operating an illegal radio station during the period 1995–1998, both from inside Israeli territorial waters and from Beit El. Segal was fined and sentenced to 6 months of community service. The prosecution appealed, attempting to get heavier sentences, but were strongly criticized by the appellate court for their handling of the case, and the prosecution was told to drop the appeal or face an investigation into their conduct during the entire trial.

From 2014 to 2023, Segal was the editor of the Makor Rishon newspaper.

Segal is married and a father of five. One of his sons, Amit Segal, is a television news reporter for Israel's TV Channel 12 ("Keshet").

== Bibliography ==
- Dear Brothers: The West Bank Jewish Underground 1988
- How My Grandmother Prevented A Civil War, September 1, 2014
