= Iranian strikes on the Weizmann Institute of Science =

2025 Iranian strikes

Iranian strikes on Weizmann Institute of Science
- Part of the Twelve-Day War and the Middle Eastern crisis
- Type: Ballistic missile strikes
- Location: Rehovot, Israel
- Target: Weizmann Institute of Science
- Date: 15 June 2025
- Executed by: Iran
- Outcome: 90% of the institute's structures sustained damage; 25% of the institute's operations suspended; 2 billion shekels in damages
- Casualties: None

On 15 June 2025, Iran launched ballistic missile strikes on the Weizmann Institute of Science, a scientific and military research facility in Rehovot, Israel, targeting and demolishing multiple facilities within the complex and inflicting considerable damage. Approximately 45 research laboratories in the Weizmann Institute sustained damage, impacting an estimated 400 to 500 researchers.

== Background ==
Israel has assassinated a number of Iranian nuclear scientists, in a bid to undermine Iran's nuclear program. The Weizmann Institute was reported to have collaborative research projects with Israeli defense companies.

== Damage ==
Approximately 90 percent of the structures in the institute were damaged, ranging from direct missile impacts to collateral consequences like shock waves, shrapnel, and fires. This damage included broken windows, collapsed laboratory floors, ruined electrical systems, and water damage resulting from firefighting efforts. The institute's Planetary Sciences Building, containing geochemistry laboratories and other chemistry-related programs, suffered significant damage from the shock waves generated by the missiles.

Alon Khen, the director of the institute, stated that the strikes had destroyed 22 laboratories, 112 university buildings, and two primary administration structures. Around 25% of the institute's operations were suspended.

Officials from the Weizmann Institute told a session of the Knesset Finance Committee that the damage inflicted on the institute totalled two billion shekels (approximately $600 million).

== Reaction ==
Yoel Gazansky, a specialist in Iranian affairs at the Israeli Institute for National Security Studies, said the Weizmann Institute had been regarded as a "symbol of Israel's scientific and technological advancement", and that Iran was conveying through this attack that "if you harm our scientists, we will retaliate by targeting your scientific personnel."
