= Erel Segal =

Israeli journalist

- אראל סג"ל

Personal details
- Born: 14 September 1970 (age 55) Jerusalem, Israel

Moshe Erel Segal (Hebrew: אראל סג"ל; born 14 September 1970) is an Israeli journalist, satirist, columnist, media personality, radio broadcaster, publicist, and musician.

== Early life ==
Segal was born in Jerusalem to a religious Zionist family. His parents are attorneys Nechama and Zalman Segal. His cousins are the brothers Israel Segal and Rabbi Dan Segal.

He attended Himelfarb High School and Hartman High School. At the age of 14, his parents divorced, and as part of a rebellious phase, Segal became a left-wing activist and secularized. After the assassination of Yitzhak Rabin and what Segal perceived as public hostility towards the "Kipot Srugot" community, he returned to right-wing politics. Following his father's severe injury in a car accident, Segal began a process of religious return, which intensified after the disengagement from Gaza and his father's death. Following the evacuation of Amona, Segal began wearing a kippah.

In 1988, he enlisted in the Israel Defense Forces and served as a combat soldier in the Golani Brigade. He later served as an instructor in the 17th Battalion and finally served in the clinic of Training Base 3. After his military service, he worked as a security guard in the Muslim Quarter of Jerusalem and for a period in moving services in New York. He completed his film studies at "Camera Obscura".

== Journalism career ==
=== Print journalism ===
In the 1990s, Segal became known for his humorous column "Segal's Fashion." Initially, his columns focused primarily on sports (especially Beitar Jerusalem, which Segal supports), but over time, he began to delve into urban legends and humorous tales. Other columns also addressed political and religious issues.

Since 1999, Segal wrote a humorous column for the newspaper "Maariv". He often sparred with other journalists at the paper and with his readers about his humor and the way he expressed his opinions. In 2008, he began publishing the column in "Makor Rishon." According to him, "Maariv" did not allow him to write about his political views.

Segal returned to writing a weekly column in the "Weekend" supplement of "Maariv" in August 2009. In 2011, the column moved to the "Musaf Shabbat" section of the paper and was titled "Segal on the Road." In his writing, Segal met with various people and discussed current political issues with them. Later, he returned to a weekly column in "Weekend." In 2012, he also wrote several columns for "Maariv's" sports supplement. In the second decade of the 21st century, he also wrote opinion columns in the "Maariv" opinion section and commentary columns in the main supplement.

Following the crisis at "Maariv" in 2014, when the paper almost closed and many of its employees were laid off, he moved to write for the "Mida" website. Since 2015, Segal has had a weekly column in the "Yoman" supplement of "Makor Rishon." In January 2017, he began writing commentary columns for the weekend magazine of the "Walla NEWS" website. In February 2018, he announced on air that he was leaving the website following the eruption of Case 4000.

Since March 2019, he has been a columnist and commentator for the newspaper "Israel Hayom".

=== Radio and TV ===
Segal hosts the long-running evening news program Erev Hadash on Israeli Public Broadcasting Corporation's Kan Channel 11.

Segal had a daily news show, together with fellow journalist Kalman Liebskind, named "Kalman & Segal", on Kan Channel 11. In addition, he hosts a weekday news show on 103fm, an Israeli radio station.

In 2020, he was briefly suspended from Kalman & Segal after appearing in a video clip singing together with prime minister Benjamin Netanyahu, which was said to be a violation of Kan's rules against participation of their employees in election campaigns. The suspension drew sharp criticism from Netanyahu and Israel's right wing parties. following intense public pressure which included fellow journalists, he was reinstated and returned to the show a few days later.

Segal is an anchor on Israel's 24-hour news Channel 14 TV station where he hosts its most popular show, "The Patriots", modeled after Fox News, and said to be a part of that channel's pro-Netanyahu editorial position. Critics have described him as "One of Netanyahu’s chief media cheerleaders" Prior to its rebranding as "Channel 14", Segal appeared on Channel 20's popular show "The Patriots" in a skit mocking then MK Stav Shaffir. Shaffir complained that the skit was offensive and constitutes "sexual harassment", and the Broadcasting Corporation open an inquiry into the affair

== Music career ==
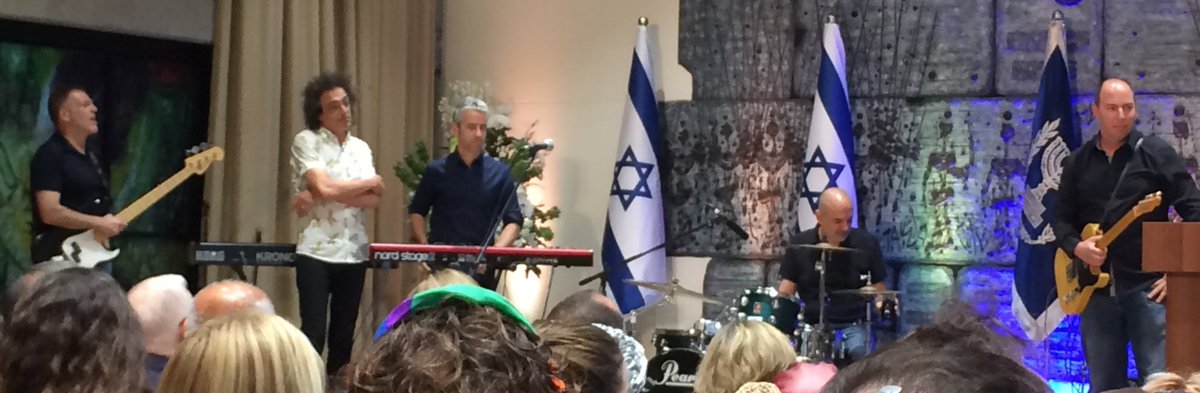
Nag' Hammadi

Segal is a member of the Israeli journalists' band "Nag' Hammadi" which also includes Dror Foer, Dror Globerman, Or Heller, and Tal Lazar. In October 2014, the band released its first single, "Don't Go to Sleep", composed by Segal with lyrics by the band members. The single is part of their debut album, "The Golden Hits That Changed the World (Part I)", which was released a year later.

== Books ==
- Diary of a Psychopath (2002)
- We'll meet in the Parasha

== Personal life ==
Segal resides in Modiin-Maccabim-Reut. He is married and has four children. He is known for his support of the Beitar Jerusalem football team.
