= Moshe Cohen-Eliya =

Israeli attorney and law professor

- משה כהן-אליה
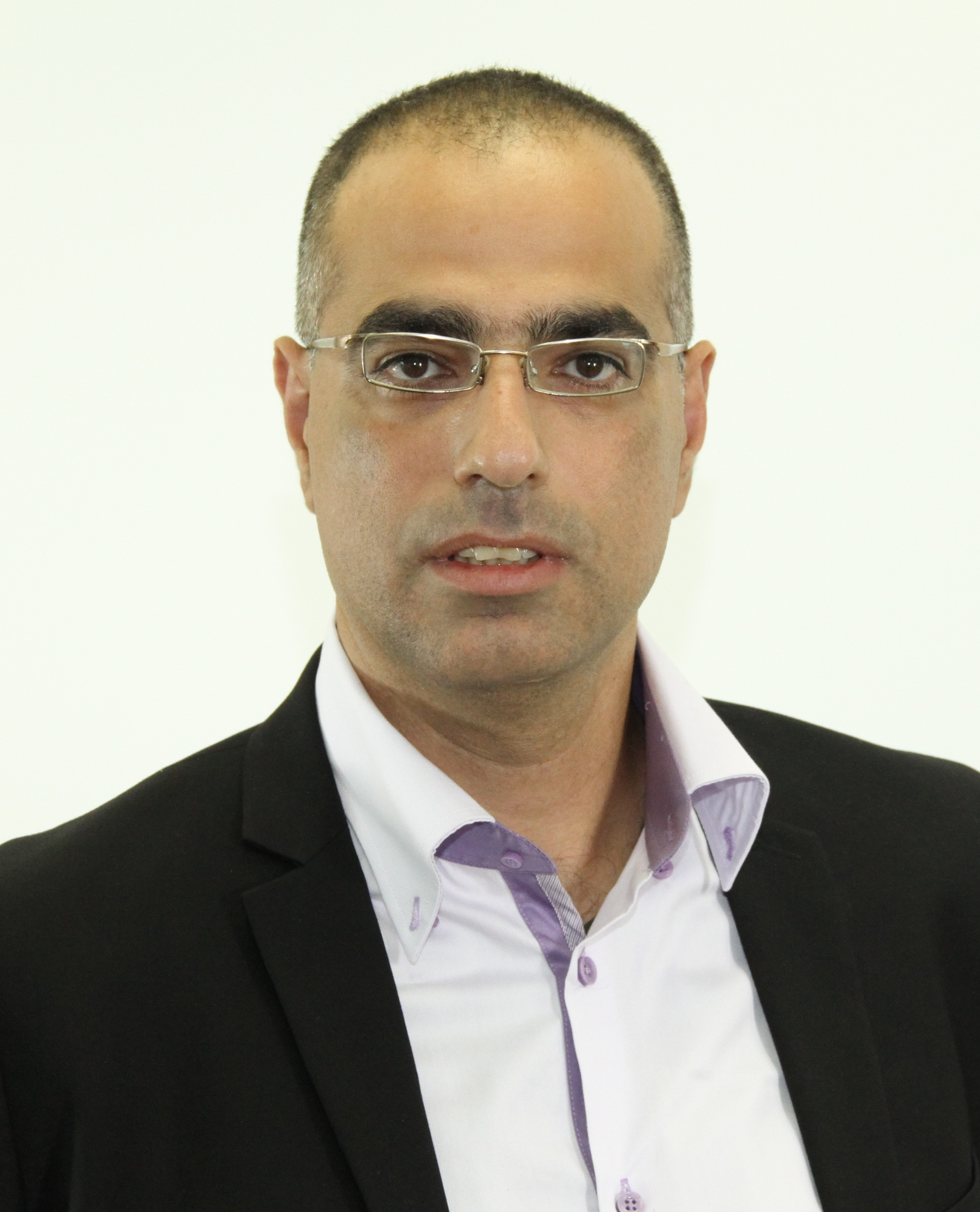
- Cohen-Eliya in February 2014
- Born: 1967 (age 58–59); Haifa, Israel

Academic background
- Education: Hebrew University of Jerusalem

Moshe Cohen-Eliya (Hebrew: משה כהן-אליה; born 1967) is an Israeli attorney and a professor of constitutional law at the College of Law and Business.

As an attorney for the Association for Civil Rights in Israel, he drafted the bill, "Prohibition of Discrimination in Products, Services and Entry into Places of Entertainment and Public Places Law, 2000" and represented the petitioners in the High Court of Justice case 6055/95, Sagi Zemach v. the Minister of Defense.

== Biography ==
Moshe Cohen-Eliya was born in Haifa, Israel in 1967. His parents were of Iraqi-Jewish and Syrian-Jewish descent. He was married to author Iris Eliya-Cohen and is the father of four. In 1993, he received his LLB (summa cum laude) from the Hebrew University, Law Faculty in Jerusalem and completed his internship under the direction of Adv. Nili Arad, the director of the High Court of Justice Division, in the State Prosecutor's Office.

He completed his LLM in human rights at American University in 1995. Returning to Israel in 1996, he was accepted into the direct- PhD Program in the Hebrew University Law Faculty. He wrote his dissertation on "The Limitation Clauses in the Israeli Basic Laws".

During the years 1994–1996, Cohen-Eliya was an attorney for the Association for Civil Rights in Israel. Among other things, he drafted the bill "Prohibition of Discrimination in Products, Services and Entry into Places of Entertainment and Public Places Law", which was enacted into law in 2000. In addition, in 1999 with Adv. Dan Yakir, he represented the petitioners in HCJ Sagi Zemach, a precedent setting case. The Israel Supreme Court held for the first time that the provision in the Military Rule Law permitting the detention of a soldier for 96 hours before being brought before a judge, violates the soldier's right to liberty—which is protected under the Basic Law: Human Dignity and Liberty—and as such this provision is void. This was the first time the Israeli Supreme Court voided an Act of the Knesset because it violated the rights protected in the Basic Law: Human Dignity and Freedom.

In the year 2000, Cohen-Eliya joined the College of Law and Business. In 2002, he was a post-doc research fellow in the Human Rights Program, Harvard Law School and in 2009 was a faculty fellow at the Edmond J. Safra Center for Ethics, Harvard University, under the direction of Prof. Lawrence Lessig. 2007-2012 he was the founder and editor-in-chief of Law & Ethics of Human Rights, which is ranked second out of 595 non-US law journals worldwide; fourth in the category of Jurisprudence and Legal theory, and fourth in the category of human rights according to the Washington Lee Law Journal Rankings (according to its impact factor) and in 2013 founded the "Israel Junior Faculty Workshop". Cohen- Eliya also sat for the selection committee of the Harvard-Stanford International Junior Faculty Forum. On 2015 he founded in Israel the first local branch of ICON-S (International Constitutional Law Society).

He was the Dean of the law school at the College of Law and Business 2010-2015 and its President 2014–2022.

== Research ==
Moshe Cohen-Eliya's research focuses on constitutional theory, proportionality, global constitutionalism, institutional corruption, the principle of antidiscrimination, multiculturalism, and human rights.

Cohen-Eliya, in collaboration with Dr. Iddo Porat, researches the doctrine of proportionality. In a number of articles written by the two, as well as in the book they co-authored, Proportionality and Constitutional Culture (Cambridge University Press, 2013), they posit that the expansion of proportionality worldwide expresses the "culture of justification," i.e., the culture that demands that the State justify all of its actions. The book situates the doctrine within a historical, cultural, and political context and compares between proportionality and its American counterpart— balancing. The book's main claim is that despite the analytical similarities between the two, there are deep cultural and historical differences that influence the manner they are understood and function in constitutional law.

Research published together with Dr. Yoav Hammer, while at the Safra Center for Ethics, Harvard University, posits that while lobbying could likely promote the democratic process and bolster citizen participation in political decision-making, corporate lobbying arouses concern, particularly related to the integrity of the democratic process since it alters the political order of the day. Cohen-Eliya and Hammer argue that lobbying succeeds in distorting the democratic process especially in niche areas such as capital markets or insurance—fields in which ordinary citizens and politicians have little interest in them and/or lack an understanding. One solution proposed by the authors is to require lobbyists to publish online all written materials they convey to MKs. In this manner, the information becomes transparent and reduces monitoring costs, while encouraging lobbying by competing for economic rivals reducing the risk of rent seeking lobbying. Member of the Knesset Shelly Yachimovich introduced a bill based on this idea in the Knesset.

== Personal life ==
Elia was married for 26 years to writer Iris Elia Cohen and they had 4 children. After 26 years of marriage, he divorced and came out as gay. He lives in Kiryat Tiv'on.

== Selected publications ==
- Proportionality and Constitutional Culture, (Cambridge University Press, 2013) (with I. Porat).
- Proportionality and Justification, (Toronto Law Journal, 2014) (with I. Porat).
- Judicial Minimalism and the Double Effect of Rules and Standard, (26 Canadian Journal of Law and Jurisprudence 283, 2012) (with I. Porat).
- Proportionality and the Culture of Justification, (59(2) American Journal of Comparative Law, 2010) (with I. Porat).
- American Balancing and German Proportionality: The Historical Origins, (8 I-CON International Journal of Constitutional Law 263, 2010) (with I. Porat).
- The Hidden Foreign Law Debate in Heller: Proportionality Approach in American Constitutional Law, (45 San Diego Law Review 367, 2009) (with I. Porat).
- Probability Thresholds as Deontological Constraints in Global Constitutionalism, (49 Columbia Journal of Transnational Law 75, 2011) (with G. Stopler).
- Discrimination against Arabs in Israel in Public Accommodations, (36 NYU Journal of International Law and Politics 717, 2004).
- Advertisements, Stereotypes and Freedom of Expression, (35 Journal of Social Philosophy 165, 2004) (with Y. Hammer).
