= Kathryn Jean Lopez =

American conservative columnist (born 1976)

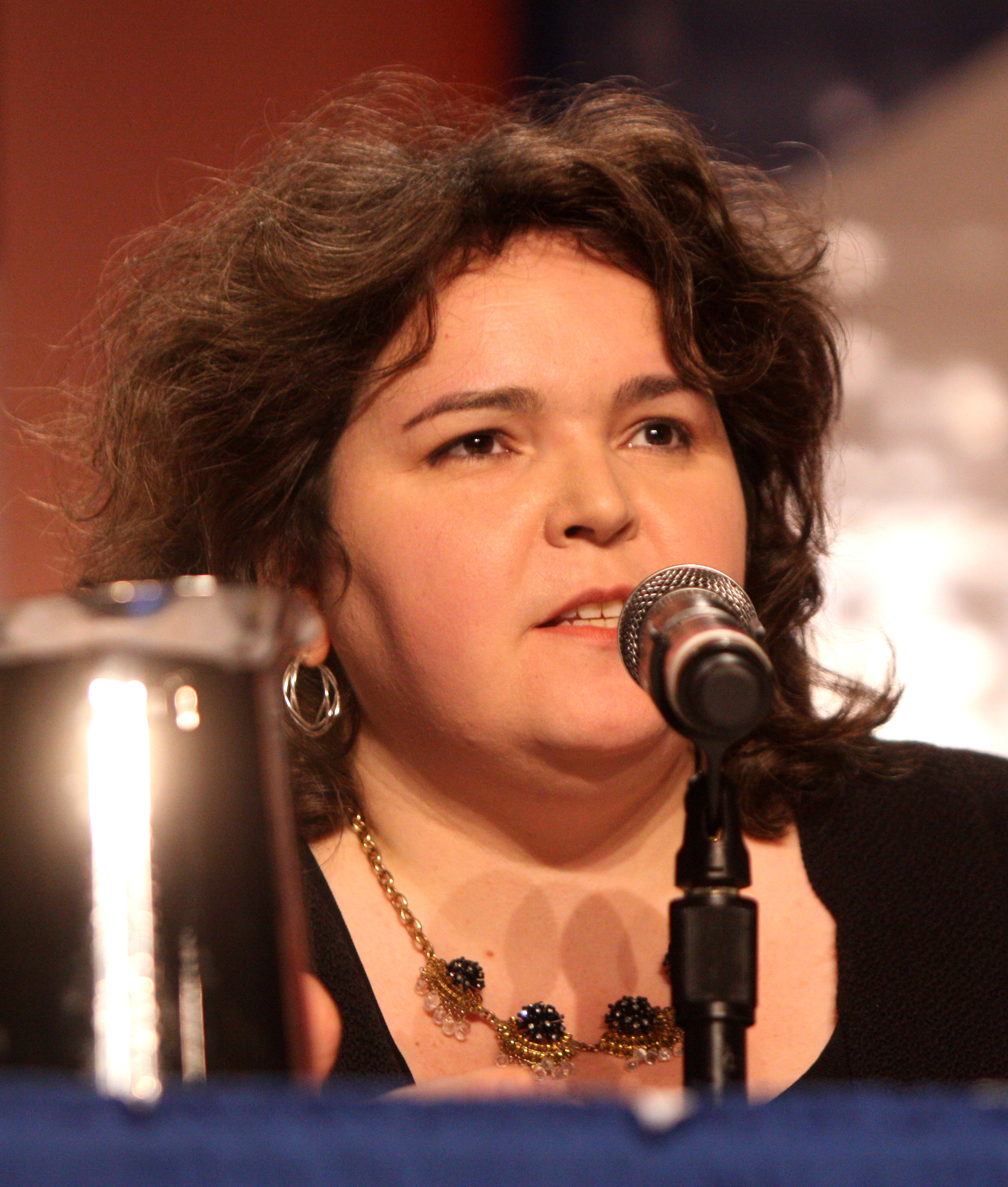
Lopez in 2011

Kathryn Jean Lopez (born March 22, 1976) is an American conservative columnist. She is the former editor and currently an editor-at-large of National Review Online.

== Early life ==
Lopez grew up in the Chelsea section of Manhattan, attended the all-girls Dominican Academy in New York, and graduated from The Catholic University of America in Washington, D.C.
