= Hevrat HaHadashot =

Israeli television news service

Keshet 12 News
- Native name: חברת החדשות הישראלית בע"מ
- Romanized name: Hevrat HaHadashot HaYisra'elit Ba'am
- Genre: News production
- Founded: 4 November 1993; 32 years ago
- Founder: Eilon Shalev; Shalom Kital
- Headquarters: Neve Ilan, Jerusalem corridor, Israel
- Key people: Avi Weiss (CEO); Yehuda Lancry (chairman); Yonit Levi (prime-time news presenter)
- Products: News broadcasting
- Total equity: NIS 100 million (2008 budget); NIS 90 million (2009)
- Owner: Keshet Media Group
- Number of employees: 350, excluding Israel Plus in Russian
- Parent: Keshet 12
- Website: www.n12.co.il

Hevrat HaHadashot (Hebrew: חברת החדשות, romanized: Hevrat HaHadashot, lit. 'The News Company') is one of the three major brands of Israeli television news programmes. Produced for Keshet 12 by Keshet Media Group subsidiary Israel Television News Company (Hebrew: חברת החדשות הישראלית בע"מ, romanized: Hevrat HaHadashot HaYisra'elit Ba'am, lit. 'Israeli News Company Ltd.'), a.k.a. Hadashot 12 (Hebrew: חדשות 12, lit. '[Channel] 12 News'). Its flagship evening news bulletin is broadcast at 8:00 p.m. IST, and anchored primarily by Yonit Levi and Danny Kushmaro. The company, originally the news department of Channel 2 – where its bulletins were known as Hadashot 2 (Hebrew: חדשות 2, lit. '[Channel] 2 News') – was funded by Keshet Media Group and Reshet; Telad also funded the company until it lost time slots on Channel 2 in 2005.

From the 1 November 2017 replacement of Channel 2 with Keshet 12 and Reshet 13 until 15 January 2019, its news programming was split between the two channels; HaTokhnit Hakalkalit (Hebrew for 'The Economic Program') was broadcast on Keshet 12, and Layla Tov Israel (Hebrew for 'Good Evening Israel') and Pgosh Et HaItonut (Hebrew for 'Meet the Press') were shown on Reshet 13. The flagship bulletin was simulcast on both channels. During the period, The company's programmes did not cross-promote Keshet's and Reshet's television shows during this period.

After the 16 January 2019 merger between Reshet and Channel 10, Keshet took full ownership of the company. Reshet took resources and programmes from Channel 10's news production company, which changed its on-air brand to Hadashot 13.

Since 2000, Hadashot 12's studios have been in the Kiryat HaTikshoret (Media Complex) of the Globus Group company in Neve Ilan of the Jerusalem corridor. Before that, they were at the Jerusalem Capital Studios (Hebrew: אולפני הבירה, romanized: Ulpaney Habira) in the Beit Egged building in Jerusalem City. Prior to the 2017 relaunch, the company's programmes were presented from a temporary studio in Neve Ilan while the main studio was being renovated.

== History ==
Hadashot 12 was founded in 1993 with Channel 2, which became one of its most-recognized symbols. The company's news is primarily viewed in Israel. It expanded beyond the evening news bulletin, and began airing programmes such as First Edition (מהדורה ראשונה, Mahadora Rishona), Six With (שש עם, Shesh im), Meet The Press (פגוש את העיתונות, Pgosh et HaItonut), Friday Studio (אולפן שישי, Ulpan Shishi) and The Economic Programme (תוכנית חיסכון, Tochnit Chisachon). The company faced competition from other TV channels, Internet websites, and radio.

=== 1993–1997 ===
Channel 2's three franchisees were Reshet, Keshet and Telad. The company was founded to produce Channel 2's news broadcasts. Its first news broadcast, on 4 November 1993 from Jerusalem Capital Studios, was less than five minutes long and was anchored by Ya'akov Eilon. As a result of Channel 2, Channel 1 decided to move Mabat to 8:00 pm, renovate its Romema studios, create new introductions and extending Mabat to 50 minutes. Eilon Shalev was the company's first CEO.

When the company was founded, Shalom Kital said that instead of hiring Channel 1 reporters, he would hire radio and newspaper reporters. The first reporters were Ya'akov Eilon, Miki Haimovich, Guy Zohar, Dana Weiss, Gideon Sa'ar, Rina Matsliah, Oshrat Kotler, Emanuel Rozen and Aharon Barnea. After several years, reporters from Channel 1 (including Gadi Sukenik and Rafi Reshef) and (later) Channel 10 were hired.

Channel 2's news broadcasts became popular, and attracted a larger audience than Channel 1 in May 1994. The competing channels covered terrorist attacks as breaking news, with uncensored depictions of body parts.

Despite their competition, both channels simulcast the signing of the Israel–Jordan peace treaty at the end of October 1994 and Yitzhak Rabin's funeral. Rabin was assassinated on 4 November 1995, two years after Channel 2 was founded. Dov GilHar (a Channel 2 reporter at the time) was a few meters away from the assassination, immediately sent a message to Roni Daniel and Aharon Barnea, and the company went into emergency mode. Yoram Arbel broke into Channel 2's broadcast from its Telad studios, and told viewers about the assassination; Guy Zohar anchored the breaking story from a studio in Tel Aviv. Moshe Nusmaum announced the assassin's name a few minutes after Ya'akov Eilon replaced Guy Zohar in Jerusalem Capital Studios. After the announcement of Rabin's death, Rafi Reshef anchored the broadcast all night.

CEO Nachman Shai understood that the competition hurt Channel 2 and Channel 1, and asked Israel Broadcasting Authority CEO Mordechai Kirshenbaum to share resources. Kirshenbaum refused, and Channel 2's viewership increased. Six weeks after Rabin's death, the company bought amateur photographer Roni Kempler's videotape of the assassination for NIS 1 million and re-aired it.

The company prepared to compete with Channel 1 during the 1996 election, its first. Reporters were placed at all party headquarters, and the prediction-poll results were announced at 10 pm; both channels were wrong.

In 1997, Haim Yavin was replaced as anchor of Channel 1's Mabat by Geula Even. Ya'akov Eilon and Miki Haimovich anchored Channel 2's evening news. The company built new studios, and two CH-53 helicopters crashed; seventy-three soldiers were killed. Both channels interrupted their broadcasts with the breaking news. A photographer accidentally filmed a soldier's bag with his name on it, painfully informing the soldier's family of his death.

=== 1998–2002 ===
Television audience measurement began in Israel on 15 February 1998, and the Israel Audience Research Board (IARB) began including the company's broadcasts on 5 July of that year. Channel 2's evening news received a 30–40 percent share of the audience, and other programs also had fairly high ratings. That year, the company launched a website with news updates, information about the company's programs, anchors, reporters and commentators and links to the desks, live video streams and featured items. The website was up for three years.

In 1999, the company covered its second election; its poll (conducted by Mina Tzemakh and the Dahaf Institution) correctly predicted the prime minister, and the company built a special studio for the telecast. That April, Haim Yavin returned to anchoring Channel 1's Mabat. Channel 1 began airing 19:30, an early election-news programme; Channel 2 responded with World Order, anchored by Arad Nir. In December 1999, a Millennium Studio with holographics was built. The studio was demolished on 2 January 2000.

During the early 2000s, when Channel 2 was Israel most-watched, anchors changed and reporters joined. They included Carmel Lutzati, Shelly Yachimovich, Oded Ben-Ami (2000), Danny Kushmaro, Ehud Ya'ari (2001), Amnon Abramovich, Oren Weigenfled (2003) and Lilach Sonin (2004–2013). In 2000, the company moved to Kiriyat HaTikshoret in Neve Ilan. The evening news was extended from 30 to 45 minutes, and to an hour in 2003; the three-minute commercial break at the end of the programme became 12 minutes of interspersed commercials.

The Second Intifada began in 2000, and the company prepared to cover news at odd hours in live reports from the field. The Ministry of Communication planned to establish a dedicated 24-hour news channel; bidding began, and Ya'akov Eilon (who left to join the competing company Hadashot Israel) was replaced by Miki Haimovich.

Hadashot Israel began producing Channel 10's news programmes. Plans for the news channel faded, and Eilon left Hadashot Israel to found Channel 10's independent news company in 2003. Channel 10's news, which aired at 19:00, was moved to 20:00 to compete with Channel 2's news.

Channel 2 began using news tickers, and Himovich and Dan Shilon anchored coverage of the 2001 Israeli prime ministerial election. After the election, Haimovich and Gadi Sukenik began anchoring the evening news. The HaShidur HaMefutzal incident occurred on 2 March 2002, triggering criticism of the company. At the end of the year, Haimovich announced that she was moving to Channel 10. Yonit Levi and Oshrat Kotler vied to anchor the news with Sukenik; Shalom Kital's chose the inexperienced, 25-year-old Levi, who anchored her first programme on 22 December 2002.

=== 2003–2006 ===
Ilan Ramon was scheduled to return to earth after 15 days in space as Israel's first astronaut at the beginning of 2003, and Channel 2 prepared a special broadcast to commemorate Space Shuttle Columbia's arrival; Ramon's father was invited to the studio. The shuttle exploded while reentering the atmosphere, and Ramon's father received news of the tragedy in the studio. Arad Nir, who reported live from Texas, said in 2009 that it was the hardest broadcast of his career.

At the beginning of 2003, Gadi Sukenik and Yonit Levi anchored the evening news for the company's fourth election. During the Iraq War, the company replaced the programme's graphics and briefly cooperated with the internet portal MSN to present its featured video articles.

In 2005, weatherman Danny Roup announced his move to Channel 10. Channel 1 weatherman Danny Deutch moved to Channel 2 to replace Roup. In April, the Second Authority for Television and Radio bid for two Channel 2 franchisees. Keshet and Reshet won the bid, and Telad stopped broadcasting and funding the news company. The company's deficit increased to NIS 10 million. At the end of August, after the Israeli disengagement from Gaza, the company changed its graphics for the third time since 2000. The graphics (made for the event) aired until 27 August, when they were replaced by new graphics. That year, Channel 10's audience began to surpass Channel 1's. Shalom Kital remained as CEO.

The company changed studios for a week in 2006 (using the slogan "Israel chooses 2"), purchased a 3D graphics system and collaborated with Reshet's satirical Mishak Makhur for its fifth election broadcast. That year, a Knesset committee chose it to operate the Knesset Channel. In June, the Cable and Satellite Broadcasting Council gave the company a 10-year contract for the Knesset Channel.

=== 2007 ===
After 12 years as CEO, Shalom Kital resigned and was replaced by executive editor Avi Weiss. On 1 August, Gadi Sukenik anchored his last evening news programme; Yonit Levi anchored the news alone, replaced occasionally by Danny Kushmaro. Channel 10 morning-show anchor Tamar Ish-Shalom became a London correspondent in October 2007, and then an anchor. She moved to Channel 10's evening news in 2011.

Channel 10 evening-news editor Gut Suderi replaced Boaz Stembler and Liran Dan in September. Stembler then edited Friday Studio before resigning. In October, the company spent NIS 2 million on a new studio. At the beginning of the month, Friday Studio anchor Aharon Barnea announced that he would move to Washington, D.C. as a correspondent. Yair Lapid anchored Friday Studio until January 2012.

=== 2008–2012 ===
At the beginning of April 2008, the company announced an agreement with El Al to produce a 30-minute news programme for El Al passengers. On 17 April of that year, it began broadcasting on the Keshet and Reshet websites. That month, the company began producing a daily news bulletin at 13:00 anchored by Oren Wiegenfeld. In September, it introduced a webpage on Keshet and Reshet websites.

In 2009, the company offered YouTube users an opportunity to ask election contestants questions, which the contestants answered on a special broadcast. For the 2009 election broadcast, anchored by Yonit Levi, the company collaborated with Keshet's satirical show Eretz Nehederet. Channel 9 ended its six-and-a-half-year agreement with the company at the beginning of March 2009, and the latter discontinued some of its programmes due to budget cuts. A world weather forecast on some programmes attracted more advertising revenue.

Young Edition, news for young people anchored by Gidon Oko, premiered in May 2011. Election System a daily programme anchored by Udi Segal and Dana Weiss with in-depth coverage of the 2013 elections, premiered in November 2012. The following month, Six With and Meet The Press were cancelled and the evening news was shortened to 45 minutes as a result of NIS 20 million in budget cuts. After ten days, a change in the Second Authority law enabled the company to reduce the cuts to NIS 5 million.

=== 2013–2016 ===
On the 2013 election night, the company again collaborated with Keshet's Eretz Nehederet and Yonit Levi anchored the broadcast. It was the most-watched programme since audience measurements began. In May 2013, Dany Kushmaro was chosen to anchor Friday Studio; Dana Weiss was chosen to anchor the weekend news, and Rina Matzliah began anchoring Meet The Press. The company collaborated with Arutz HaYeladim in October of that year to produce Young Edition as a 20-minute daily program with the weekly Channel 2 Friday edition. The company celebrated its 20th anniversary the following month, airing promos with important events it reported, and replaced its midnight bulletin with a nightly news programme. Yonit Levi went on maternity leave, and was replaced by Keren Marciano and Danny Kushmaro.

The average audience measurement was 29.4 percent during Operation Protective Edge in July 2014, the company's best July ever and its strongest month in 15 months. The channel had its first debate between the prime-ministerial candidates before the 2015 elections on 26 February, receiving a 30.6-percent audience share. On election night, the evening news was broadcast from a transparent studio on the Knesset plaza; the programme was watched by 37.7 percent of the audience.

=== 2017–present ===
On 9 May 2017, the Israel Broadcasting Authority announced that it would cease broadcasting at the end of the week. The channel was replaced with Kan, on channel 11. At the time, Channel 2 operated on channel 22; the Educational Television Service operated on channel 23, the Sports Channel on 55, the Knesset channel on 99, and Channel 10 on 10. The major Israeli channels soon re-formed and moved to other channels. Keren Marciano went on maternity leave, and Dana Weiss anchored the evening news with Yonit Levi and Danny Kushmaro.

Shortly before Channel 2 split, the company rebranded itself as "The News (HaHadashot)" and its content moved to Keshet 12 and Reshet 13 in HD. During construction of a new studio in Neve Ilan, broadcasts began originating from a temporary studio at the same location on 25 September 2017. Broadcasting from the new studio began on 1 November, after the Channel 2 split.

Most broadcasts aired on both channels, except for The Economic Program (aired on Keshet 12) and Good Night Israel and Meet The Press (aired on Reshet 13). To cover breaking news, the channels can join the Hadashot 12 broadcast or remain with regular programming.

On 31 October 2017, Channel 2's last evening news programme aired; Danny Kushmaro introduced the company's new studio, and Yonit Levi was in the temporary studio. The following day, Hadashot 12 began broadcasting on Keshet 12 and Reshet 13. The company lost its contract for the Knesset Channel to Channel 10 on 1 August 2018.

== Notable anchors ==
- Yonit Levi
- Danny Kushmaro
- Ya'akov Eilon (former)
- Miki Haimovich (former)
- Yair Lapid (former)

== See also ==
- Hadashot 13
