= Israeli news channel project =

The project for a dedicated Israeli news channel was one of the designated channels enshrined in the 1997 Yossi Peled cabinet and was meant to be Israel's first news channel, but after a series of lengthy judicial battles, the channel never launched. It was part of a package of dedicated channels on Israeli cable television, and all of them but the news channel did go on air.

The channel was supposed to be broadcast on channel 7 on both cable and satellite companies and would have delivered news from Israel and the world throughout the day. The bid for the channel stipulated that its revenue should come from commercial advertising and sponsored content.

== Background ==
In 1997, the government approved the report of the Yossi Peled committee, set up to create a proposal to expand and reorganize the public broadcasting system. The report recommended the adoption of a new policy to create a free market for electronic media, based on the principle of an "open sky" for everyone. The committee recommended licenses for direct-to-home satellite television (Yes), the creation of a new private terrestrial channel (which would become (Channel 10), and the creation of five or six dedicated cable channels: an Arabic service, a Russian channel, an Amharic channel for Ethiopians in Israel, a channel for Israeli cultural heritage (which would become Channel 20, now conservative channel Now 14), an Israeli music channel (Channel 24) and a news channel, all of which financed by commercial advertising.

In 1998, the Ministry of Communications, by means of the Cable and Satellite Broadcasting Council, did the preliminary selection of the five channels (the Amharic channel was excluded from the initial plan). The decision included Al-Hala TV (Arabic), a news channel, a Russian channel, a music channel (Channel 24) and a cultural heritage channel.

At the dawn of the 21st century, the Ministry of Communications started issuing license bids for these specialized channels. As of 2014, only four of these launched.

== The bid ==
On 14 November 2000, the Ministry of Communications launched the bid for the news channel, the first among the five. At a press conference in Tel Aviv, Minister of Communications Binyamin Ben-Eliezer, Cable and Satellite Broadcasting Council president Dorit Inbar and director of the Public Broadcasting Administration Yoram Mokedi presented the bidding terms for the news channel. The launch date for the channel's launch was set to be November 2001.

The goal of the bid was to create a news channel with a local Israeli character, with 60% of its programming dedicated to news on Israeli events and 15% to programs on events outside Israel. The bid also suggested that the license should be given for ten years, with the option of increasing it for six more years. In its first year, it would broadcast a minimum of at least eight hours a day, and, in the second year, twelve hours a day. During the licensing period, it was also stipulated that the channel should be obliged to broadcast from 6pm to 11pm. According to the license terms, the channel should pay the cable and satellite companies a single NIS 100,000 tax to the State and a 5% compensation to the Treasury after three years of the operation of the license.

== Companies involved ==
Several groups and companies expressed their interest in bidding for the news channel, among them was Tom Communications, which was bidding for what would become Channel 10. Tia Communications, a company linked to Herzliya Studios, also showed interest. Finally, two groups presented concrete proposals: Hadashot 24 and Hadashot Israel.

=== Hadashot 24 ===
With the announcement of the bid for the news channel, Ya'akov Eilon left Channel 2 to take part in the bid and to have an active role in the new channel. He joined the Hadashot 24 (News 24) group, led by Nissim Meshaal, and, with him, several renowned journalists, including Yair Stern, Geula Even and Amnon Barkai, joined. Yaakov Ayalon and Nissim Meshaal invested their own money in the group, with each of them having 10% of the shares. Other investors of the group, at its founding, were: the Ofer brothers (around 20%), Shai Nesher (around 10%) and Dankner Investments (5%). Meshaal was the group's CEO and Ayalon was selected to be the director of its news department, presenting the future channel's main newscast.

=== Hadashot Israel ===
The second group that took part in the bidding for the all-news channel was the Hadashot Israel group, led by Moshe Slonsky, and its news department was led by Ilana Dayan, which had previously left Telad and Channel 2. Other journalists invested in the group to make their success viable and to obtain financial gains with the news channel, Among the investors were Globus Group (former financer of the Cannon Group – owner of the G.G. Israel Studios in Neve Ilan (around 12%), Formula Company (around 20%) and Eliyahu Rochman (around 25% of the group). The Hadashot Israel Group was also responsible of the production for the newscasts of the "Third Channel"; which was on the verge of being created at the time – Channel 10.

== Results of the bid ==
On 17 April 2001 at noon, the winning group to operate the channel was announced at a press conference in Tel Aviv. Lawyer Dorit Inbar, who was also CSBC president at the time, announced that Nissim Mashal's Hadashot 24 group won the bid. After its win, defeated group Hadashot Israel questioned the way it was administered. Its representant declared that the leaders would decide if they should appeal from the decision of the bidding commission to the justice.

Meanwhile, Hadashot 24 promised to launch the channel on air for up to six months after winning, at the end of 2001. Ya'akov Eilon, head of the group's news department, announced that the channel would work in a format similar to that of CNN, with live broadcasts and news bulletins 24 hours a day. Ilana Dayan, head of the news department of the Hadashot Israel group, lamented the decision of the bidding commission to grant the license to Hadashot 24, but wished the rivals success in its operation.

== Legal problems ==
=== Hadashot Israel's petition to the Tel Aviv District Court ===
On 6 May of that year, Hadashot Israel decided to present a petition ot the Tel Aviv District Court with the aim of obtaining a judicial order that forbate the Ministry of Communications from granting the operating license to Hadashot 24 and to transfer the license to this group. In the petition, Hadashot Israel's representants alleged that the OK from the CSBC assessor Eli Nissan was biased, and, consequently, the choice of Hadashot 24 as the winning group should be rejected. The petition also noticed that the CSBC decision contained numeric and countability errors and that Hadashot 24's proposal did not attend to the demanded norms.

The trial lasted around three months, during which judgr Dr. Oded Modrik, examined the allegations of the Hadashot Israel group, which lost the bid, and the decision process by the CSBC during the bidding commission's hearings. The sentence on the issue was handed down in early August that year.

=== Rejection of Hadashot Israel's appeal ===
On 5 August, the District Court rejected Hadashot Israel's petition and maintained Hadashot 24's status as the winner. In the sentence, Dr. Oded Modrik wrote that, excluding some comments and remarks, practically all of the group's arguments wer erejected. It was also determined that Hadashot Israel should pay judicial costs worth NIS 25,000 to the Communications Ministry and the Cable and Satellite Broadcasting Council, and a further NIS 25,000 to Hadashot 24.

Winning bid Hadashot 24 promised after the verdict that the channel would launch in early 2002, delayed from late 2001, as a result of a petition to the District Court, which dragged the launch four munths beyond the initial plan.

=== Hadashot Israel's appeal to the Supreme Court ===
Two days after the district court gave the license to Hadashot 24, Hadashot Israel issued an announcement informing that it pretended to appeal to the Supreme Court of Israel to reverse the decision. Around two weeks later, the group did it.

The decision to present the appeal caused a new delay to its launch. Hadashot 24 CEO Nissim Meshal complained that Hadashot Israel was trying to damage his group and delaying its launch again, and that it was causing severe financial damage to it.

=== Accepting Hadashot Israel's appeal ===
On 18 December, after a long and exhaustive judicial battle, the Supreme Courte accepted Hadashot Israel's appeal, this rendering Hadashot 24's license non-valid. Supreme Court judges, its vice-president Shlomo Levin, judge Yitzhak Englerd and judge Ayla Procaccia, determined in their decision that the question of operating the channel should return to the CSBC's bidding committee, which would examine if Hadashot Israel was in line with the minimum requisites and could obtain a license.

Meanwhile, winner Hadashot Israel, signed a contract with Channel 10 to produce its daily newscasts. It was initially expected for them to be presented by Ilana Dayan, but she refused the offer, preferring to join another current affairs program. At the same time, it became known that the channel made asimilar proposal to Rafi Reshef, who also rejected it. Finally, Yaakov Eilon was selected to present the newscasts, by sealing a contract with Channel 10 and not Hadashot Israel, which won the bid after competing with Hadashot 24, of which Eilon was one of the leaders. This caused a new delay for the bid, which was expected to start only in January 2003.

== Return to the bidding committee ==
=== Dissolution of Hadashot 24 ===
With the decision of the Supreme Court, the group decided not to continue with the judicial process in case the Bidding Committee granted the license to Hadashot Israel. Around two weeks after the decision, Hadashot 24 Administrative Council president Udi Angel, announced that, in a council meeting, the process to dissolve the group began following the Supreme Court's decision.

During all that time, the bidding commission discussed if Hadashot Israel should attend to the minimum requisites to receive the license to replace Hadashot 24, which had been deactivated. Lawyer Dorit Inbar, who was the president of the CSBC at the time, believed that, if Hadashot Israel did not win the license, there was the possibility of archiving the license and not launching the channel.

=== Hadashot Israel wins the bid ===
On 2 January 2002, the CSBC finally determined that Hadashot Israel would be responsible for operating the news channel. The decision was taken during a council meeting as the bidding commission, after receiving a juridical agreement saying that Hadashot Israel did follow the minimum requirements of the license, which also referred to foreign participation and division of costs, since the ordinance stipulated that at least two thirds of the controlling hsareholders should be Israeli citizens and residents. The council's decision ended the lengthy judicial process, lasting eight months, referring to the identity of the group that would operate the channel.

Hadashot Israel approached the CSBC with the aim of slightly flexibilizing its bidding conditions. Among the group's solicited concessions was a five-year license extension, from ten to fifteen years, and the possibility of investing US$1 million in its first year producing news instead of documentaries, which the CSBC rejected. In mid-September 2002, almost a year after winning the bid, the license to operate the channel was granted. The group promised to launch it in April 2003 with an investment of NIS 110 million in the first year alone.

== End of the project ==
=== Timing issues ===
Despite Hadashot Israel's promises to be on air in early 2003 (projected in December to launch on 1 April 2003), the channel did not launch as planned due to the constant changes to the shareholder structure. Among those who entered were Ron Lauder, who acquired 12% of the channel from Formula (which initially controlled 23%), businessman Zvi Hefetz, which acquired 11.5% from the Roychman family (which owned 23% of the channel) and a further 11,5% from Formula.

As of March 2003, the group was owned by Zvi Hefetz (23%), Ron Lauder (12%), the Roychman family (11,5%), GG Studios (12.5%), IGB (12.5%), the network founders, (11%), the prospective news presenters (8%), Formula Company (0.5%) and other investors. On 17 March 2003, the channel was expected to launch; the previous day, the CSBC announced that it would present a working plan within thirty days where Israel Hadashot would present its reasons to operate, otherwise it would have its license revoked.

=== Disputes between shareholders ===
After the entrance of new investors and the exit of those who were involved until then, conflicts between new and old invstors emerged. Globus Group Studios, owner of 12,5% of the channel, expressed discontent with Ron Lauder's entrance to the company. GG Studios owner Yoram Globus alleged that, when the group was founded, it was promised that all of the channel's productions would be done at the Neve Ilan studios under a ten-year contract, which they controlled, whereas, with the entrance of Ron Lauder, controller of Jerusalem Capital Studios (JCS), its productions would be divided between both compounds. Each side of the investors opted to present their own candidate for the post of CEO, after disagreements between both.

Gradually, the agreements the company signed with the company and those that should have been signed, started to collapse. The contract with Channel 10 to produce its newscasts was cancelled after around six months; the company also tried supplying news to the Russian-language Israel Plus (later Channel 9), but this ended opting for Channel 2's news producer, and subsequently the company tried producing content for Yes, but the negotiations did not end in an agreement.

On 25 March, the company fired 20 of its 28 staff but could rehire up to 150 in case of a future launch.

=== Revogation of the license ===
After the channel not launching in the scheduled deadlines, the CSBC started threatening Israel Hadashot with the revoking of its license. Behind the scenes, however, the staff thought that the council did not take extreme measures, since a lot of effort had been invested in its bidding and the council, actually, didn't aim for a closure. In June 2003, it received its new and last deadling of eight months just to go on air. Meanwhile, the threat to Israel Hadashot came from another place, when, in late April 2003, Globus Group Studios entered with a petition at the Tel Aviv District Court to dissolve the Israel Hadashot group. The dissolution petition alleged that "Israel Hadashot was administered in a fraudulent, negligent and wasteful way, and violating the fiduciary duties of its directors".

The court rejected Globus Group Studios' request, but demanded that Israel Hadashot should not sign an agreement with another company to provide studio services, leaving all of the production controlled by GGS. At the time, the CSBC decided, in late May, to approve an eight-month deadline for the launch, by year-end 2003. The council also gave the grant several conditions: presenting active management within a two-month window, a 45-day deadline for investments in funds worth NIS 34 million from shareholder funds, presentation of contracts with studios and facilities and the start of test transmissions within a six-month deadline.

Israel Hadashot did not follow the conditions and did not launch even after mid-2004. In June 2004, Yoram Globus acquired the control of the channel, increasing its shares on the group to 55%. Finally, approximately four years after presenting the bid, Hadashot Israel's license to broadcast the news channel was revoked. After a long judicial battle, in which Hadashot 24 won the bid, Hadashot Israel appealed to the District Court, which rejected it. Subsequently, Hadashot Israel appealed to the Supreme Court, which accepted it and made Hadashot 24's license unvalid. After incessant disputed between shareholders, the project came to an end without even launching.

== Attempts at relaunching the project ==
In 2008, after Operation Cast Lead (the first Gaza War), the CSBC, alongside its president Nitzan Chen, decided to examine another possibility to launch a new bid for a news channel. The Council contacted Yoram Abramson's accounting company to evaluate the financial viability of such a channel, explained the motivations behind the decision to several groups who showed interest in operating it, and they thought that, after the global economic recession and the Gaza War, the public necessity of launching an Israeli all-news channel was clear. Chen declared that "an all-news channel is essential for all Israeli citizens and can offer an immediate response, with 24-hour coverage of the events. The recent war in Gaza and the global financial crisis show the need for a news channel styled after CNN. It will cover a wide array of areas and will give a voice to the topics that are currently in the public agenda in several spheres of life, both in Israel and in the entire world". One year after the announcement, in January 2010, Gilad Adin was nominated CSBC consultor to examine the viability of establishing the channel, and, at the end of the year, council president Nitzan Chen announced that he would present his on conclusions on the topic in early 2011., Nitzan's announcement was preceded by meetings between him and HOY and Yes's bosses over the creation of the news channel, which included a discussion on the type of model in which it would operate.

The CSBC enabled the company behind the news services of channels 2 and 10 (both private terrestrial channels under the Second Authority) to take part in the bidding process, due to the chaos in which Israeli media was at the time. Still in early 2011, it became known that Channel 10 was set to enter a new bid due to a 100 million debt. The extant Channel 10 brand took its owners to consider a merger with Channel 2 concessionaire Reshet, while Hadashot 10 would close, leaving thousands of its staff without a job. The CSBC enabled Hadashot 10 to compete in the hope of using the news channel as a plan to save the terrestrial channel. Hadashot 2, which was also facing difficulties, received a similar permit to compete for the bid. In April 2011, the RGE Group, of Aviv Giladi, of the Recanati family and Len Blavatnik, announced that it would take part in the bidding for the establishment of the channel.

The resumption of the idea to create an Israeli news channel was not just from the Cable and Satellite Council. The Second Authority also announced that it would enable, with the conversion to digital terrestrial television in 2013, the creation of theme-specific channels, such as a news channel and a sports channel. The idea for a general news channel was not revived.

== News channels in Israel since 2011 ==
On 17 July 2013, i24NEWS started broadcasting from Tel Aviv, but in English, French and Arabic. One of the five channels envisioned in the 1997 cabinet, Channel 20, converted into a mostly news channel in 2021, upon moving from channel 20 to channel 14 on cable companies. The channel is conservative and known for its affiliation to the Bibist Likud party.

i24NEWS launched a Hebrew version on 30 June 2024, which was criticized by Maariv journalist as "Now 14 in a suit", contrary to its opening speech suggested it to be neutral. TV10 Israel launched on 1 January 2025, whose editorial stance raised suspicions when its website launched, which resembled that of i24NEWS.
