= SpongeBob SquarePants (musical) =

Musical co-conceived and directed by Tina Landau

- The Broadway Musical
- Playbill of the Broadway production
- Music: Various
- Lyrics: Various
- Book: Kyle Jarrow
- Basis: SpongeBob SquarePants by Stephen Hillenburg
- Premiere: June 7, 2016: Oriental Theatre, Chicago
- Productions: 2016 Chicago; 2017 Broadway; 2019-2020 North American tour 2023 United Kingdom tour 2024 Israel
- Awards: Drama Desk Award for Outstanding Musical, Outer Critics Circle Award for Outstanding New Broadway Musical, Outer Critics Circle Award for Outstanding New Score

SpongeBob SquarePants: The Broadway Musical (originally titled The SpongeBob Musical, later retitled for the national tour) is a musical, co-conceived and directed by Tina Landau with songs by various artists and a book by Kyle Jarrow. It is based on the Nickelodeon animated television series SpongeBob SquarePants and made its world premiere in June 2016 at the Oriental Theatre in Chicago. Following a month of previews, the musical opened on Broadway at the Palace Theatre in December 2017.

The musical follows SpongeBob SquarePants’ attempts to avert a volcanic eruption that could potentially wipe out all life in Bikini Bottom.

The show was produced by Nickelodeon, The Araca Group, Sony Music Masterworks and Kelp on the Road.

The musical opened to critical acclaim. With twelve Tony Award nominations, it tied with Mean Girls for the most-nominated production at the 72nd Tony Awards in 2018. The show closed at the Palace Theatre on September 16, 2018, due to theatre renovations. At the time of its closing, it had played 29 previews and 327 regular performances. A non-Equity North American tour opened on September 22, 2019, at Proctors Theatre in Schenectady, New York. On December 7, 2019, Nickelodeon aired The SpongeBob Musical: Live on Stage!, a television special of the show featuring members from the original Broadway cast. The tour closed in 2020 due to the ongoing COVID-19 pandemic. The SpongeBob Musical UK tour opened on April 5, 2023, at the Mayflower Theatre in Southampton and closed on September 9, 2023, at the Theatre Royal Newcastle.

== Development ==
On January 16, 2014, The Flaming Lips' lead singer Wayne Coyne mentioned through Twitter that he was writing lyrics for a developing SpongeBob Squarepants musical. Official plans for the show were first announced at Nickelodeon's upfront on February 25, 2015. The upfront presentation included a performance of the musical's opening number, "Bikini Bottom Day." On February 26, Nickelodeon's chief operating officer Sarah Kirshbaum Levy told the Associated Press that the show was "not definite."

In August 2015, Nickelodeon announced that the show would premiere in Chicago before a Broadway run in late 2016. Its director, book author, and several of the musicians involved were also announced. The full cast list was released in April 2016. Rehearsals for the show's debut in Chicago began on April 11 in New York. Throughout early 2016, Nickelodeon executives met with Broadway theater owners to arrange its Broadway premiere. Michael Reidel of the New York Post stated that Broadway representatives were "impressed" after seeing a presentation of the show.

In late May 2016, technical rehearsals for the show were conducted. Chris Jones of the Chicago Tribune stated that Nickelodeon was concerned about "an incomplete SpongeBob costume [making] it into a photograph, spoiling a planned big reveal." In June 2016, Gordon Cox of Variety reported that the musical's budget was between $15 and $20 million. The show opened on June 7, 2016, at the Oriental Theatre in Chicago before opening on Broadway on December 4, 2017, at the Palace Theatre.

== Synopsis ==
=== Pre-Show ===
Patchy the Pirate, SpongeBob's number one fan, and President of the SpongeBob fan club, sits on the stage after the audience has taken their seats. He reveals he has traveled from Encino, California, to record the musical on his phone and make a "pirate copy". Two security guards tell Patchy to leave, as the show is about to begin. Patchy objects but gets kicked out as he claims he is a victim of pirate discrimination and sings a protest chant, "Yo ho, we won't go". One of the guards apologizes, reminds the audience to put away their phones (pointing out one member of the audience), then tells the audience to enjoy the show. In the television special, this prologue is replaced by an animated segment about theatre etiquette.

=== Act One ===
SpongeBob SquarePants awakens and welcomes the day with his pet sea snail, Gary ("Bikini Bottom Day"). He greets various friends in his hometown of Bikini Bottom—including his best friend Patrick Star, his neighbor Squidward Tentacles, and his friend Sandy Cheeks—as he walks to the Krusty Krab restaurant. At work, his boss Mr. Krabs tells his daughter Pearl Krabs that she will manage the restaurant one day. With Pearl uninterested, SpongeBob hints at his desire to become the manager. Mr. Krabs laughs at the idea, telling SpongeBob he is "just a simple sponge" ("Bikini Bottom Day" (Reprise 1)). Then, a violent tremor suddenly rocks the entire town.

News reporter Perch Perkins reveals that the tremor was caused by the nearby Mount Humongous, a volcano that will soon erupt, throwing the town into a panic ("No Control"). SpongeBob cheers up an upset Patrick by reiterating that they are best friends forever ("BFF"). With the town in a panic over the impending doom, married villains Plankton and Karen try to convince the citizens to enter an escape pod that ensures safety—a cover-up for their secret scheme to hypnotize the citizens in the pod into liking the chum that they serve at their restaurant, the Chum Bucket ("When the Going Gets Tough"). The townspeople, unknowingly, support this idea and decide to hold a last-minute music concert to raise enough money to build the pod. Squidward's idea of his one-man show is immediately shut down. Instead, Pearl suggests that a famous rock band, the Electric Skates, play at the concert. Everyone agrees and Squidward is named manager of the event. Despite Sandy's pleas that science could help them solve the problem, the townsfolk ignore her for being a land mammal.

SpongeBob, however, is against the idea of leaving town and believes the citizens should save Bikini Bottom. SpongeBob thinks back on Mr. Krabs' words from earlier and wonders if he could save the town ("(Just a) Simple Sponge"). He goes to Patrick and Sandy for help. Mr. Krabs sees the upcoming disaster as a money-making opportunity, holding an "apocalypse sale". Pearl worries about her father's greed, believing that it overshadows his care for her ("Daddy Knows Best").

Meanwhile, SpongeBob convinces Patrick and Sandy to team up, climb the volcano, and stop it from erupting with a bubble device Sandy will build. The friends are determined to succeed ("Hero Is My Middle Name"). Before they start their plan, a group of cultist sardines appear. They found wisdom in Patrick's thoughts at the town meeting and decide to make him their new leader ("Super Sea Star Savior"). Patrick likes the idea and decides to back out of SpongeBob's plan so that he can bask in self-glory, angering SpongeBob. The two argue and end their "BFF" status. After Patrick leaves, Sandy reminds SpongeBob that things are bound to be okay. The entire company reveals their personal thoughts and feelings about the impending disaster ("Tomorrow Is").

=== Act Two ===
Patchy again sneaks onstage, telling the audience that pirates are persecuted by others because of stereotypes ("Poor Pirates"), supported in song by a group of pirates he met during the show's first act after wandering into a dive bar in the nearby Hell's Kitchen. (In the Chicago run, he stated he was "walking around the Chicago Loop.") The theater's security again intervenes to chase Patchy away as he screams that he'll be back.

SpongeBob wakes up and greets a new day, the day when the volcano is expected to erupt ("Bikini Bottom Day" (Reprise 2)). Bikini Bottom has fallen into anarchy and chaos: the mayor has employed a dictatorship over the people and an angry mob has started to hunt down Sandy, thinking her science is the cause for the volcano's impending eruption. Sandy hides from the mob and shows SpongeBob the ingenious bubble device, the Eruption Interrupter. They plan to throw it inside the volcano and save the town.

Back in Bikini Bottom, Plankton worries that Sandy and SpongeBob will successfully climb up the mountain and save the town, but Karen tells him that she found his misplaced Avalanche Maker 3000, saying they can use it to create an avalanche to kill SpongeBob and Sandy. The Electric Skates finally arrive ("Bikini Bottom Boogie") and accept Squidward's request to join their opening act if Squidward buys every item on a long shopping list. Meanwhile, SpongeBob and Sandy make their way up the volcano with great difficulty, and Sandy tries to increase their morale, encouraging them to never give up ("Chop to the Top"). SpongeBob cannot help but think of how he misses Patrick and wishes he were there to help them. In Bikini Bottom, Patrick finds life as a guru unexciting and misses SpongeBob as well, prompting him to leave his followers behind to help SpongeBob ("(I Guess) I Miss You").

Squidward obtains all but one of the items on the Electric Skates' list, so the band refuses his request and calls him a "loser". In response, Squidward, who was called a loser in his childhood, snaps back at the band in anger. As the band quits and leaves, Squidward insists that he is not a loser and performs a song with a tap dance number and backup chorus, but becomes depressed again when he realizes that it was all in his imagination ("I'm Not a Loser"). However, with the band gone, there is no concert or escape pod. Pearl suggests Mr. Krabs hand over his money to build the escape pod, but even he cannot meet the price, and the town's citizens panic and fight one another. Back on the mountain, Plankton and Karen use the avalanche maker to cause an avalanche, sending SpongeBob falling off the mountain. Patrick arrives and saves him with a jetpack Sandy invented, and the two reaffirm their friendship and follow Sandy to the summit of the mountain. When they reach the top, neither Sandy nor Patrick can reach the rim where they need to throw the device in. They turn to SpongeBob, who doubts his skills ("(Just a) Simple Sponge" (Reprise)). They remind him that he is the only one who can squeeze through tight areas and that his optimism has gotten them this far. His determination renewed, SpongeBob throws the Eruption Interrupter in. The three soon discover the chaos Bikini Bottom is in and immediately parachute down to the town to stop the fighting from escalating further.

SpongeBob tries to calm everyone down, insisting that, despite whatever happens, they all have each other ("Best Day Ever"). When the time comes for the volcano to erupt, everyone braces for their potential deaths. However, time passes with no eruption, and bubbles fall from above, signaling that Sandy's invention worked. With Bikini Bottom safe, everyone apologizes for their behavior, as Plankton and Karen argue and accidentally reveal their secret plot. Mr. Krabs decides to have SpongeBob as the manager of the Krusty Krab someday. Everyone then decides that they should celebrate by having a new concert led by Pearl and Squidward, much to his delight, as Sandy is now welcomed back by the citizens of Bikini Bottom. Patchy descends from above on a rope, having finally managed to sneak into the show. He makes the cast reluctantly agree to let him be a part of the finale as the townspeople welcome the brand-new day ("Bikini Bottom Day" (Reprise 3)). During the curtain call, the cast performs one final song ("'SpongeBob SquarePants' Theme Song").

== Musical numbers ==
Act I

- "Bikini Bottom Day" by Jonathan Coulton – SpongeBob, Patrick, Squidward, Sandy, Mr. Krabs, Plankton, Karen & Company
- "Bikini Bottom Day" (reprise) by Coulton – SpongeBob
- "No Control" by David Bowie & Brian Eno – Perch Perkins, SpongeBob, Mr. Krabs, Pearl, Squidward, Patrick, Sandy, Plankton, Karen & Company^{2}
- "BFF" by Plain White T's – SpongeBob & Patrick
- "When the Going Gets Tough" by T.I. – Plankton, Karen, SpongeBob & Company
- "(Just a) Simple Sponge" by Panic! at the Disco – SpongeBob & Ensemble
- "Daddy Knows Best" by Alex Ebert – Mr. Krabs & Pearl^{2}
- "Hero Is My Middle Name" by Cyndi Lauper & Rob Hyman – SpongeBob, Patrick & Sandy
- "Super Sea Star Savior" by Yolanda Adams – Patrick & Sardines
- "Tomorrow Is" by The Flaming Lips – Sandy, SpongeBob, Squidward, Mr. Krabs, Plankton, Karen & Company

Act II

- "Poor Pirates" by Sara Bareilles – Patchy & Pirates^{2}
- "Bikini Bottom Day" (reprise II) by Coulton – SpongeBob^{1}
- "Bikini Bottom Boogie" by Steven Tyler & Joe Perry – The Electric Skates, Pearl & Company^{2}
- "Chop to the Top" by Lady Antebellum – Sandy & SpongeBob
- "(I Guess I) Miss You" by John Legend – Patrick & SpongeBob^{2}
- "I'm Not a Loser" by They Might Be Giants – Squidward & Company
- "(Just a) Simple Sponge" (reprise) by Panic! at the Disco – SpongeBob
- "Best Day Ever" by Andy Paley & Tom Kenny – SpongeBob & Company
- "Bikini Bottom Day" (reprise III) by Coulton – SpongeBob & Company
- "SpongeBob SquarePants Theme Song" by Derek Drymon, Mark Harrison, Stephen Hillenburg & Blaise Smith – SpongeBob & Company

1. Cut from the original airing of the TV special
2. Cut from abbreviated airings of the TV special

=== Instrumentation ===
The show's Tony-nominated orchestrations by Tom Kitt utilized an orchestra of 18 for the Broadway production, including Mike Dobson who served as the live Foley artist and played the percussion book.

=== SpongeBob SquarePants Original Cast recording ===
On June 28, 2016, Masterworks Broadway announced that the Chicago cast would record a cast album in early August, with Masterworks producing the album. On September 14, 2017, the full cast recording was made available on the NPR website. The cast recording was released in its physical form in stores as well as on streaming sites on September 22, 2017, two months prior to the show's Broadway premiere.

SpongeBob SquarePants: Original Cast Recording

Soundtrack album cast recording by Original Cast of SpongeBob SquarePants
- Released: September 22, 2017
- Recorded: August 2016
- Genres: Show tune; musical comedy; indie rock; alternative rock
- Length: 57:19
- Label: Masterworks Broadway

All tracks are written and composed by various artists, as listed below (additional music, arrangements and orchestrations by Tom Kitt; additional lyrics by Jonathan Coulton).

No.	Title	Length
1.	"Prologue"	1:04
2.	"Bikini Bottom Day" (Jonathan Coulton)	6:12
3.	"No Control" (David Bowie and Brian Eno)	3:17
4.	"BFF" (Plain White T's)	2:41
5.	"When the Going Gets Tough" (T.I.)	2:47
6.	"(Just a) Simple Sponge" (Panic! at the Disco)	3:57
7.	"Daddy Knows Best" (Alex Ebert)	2:53
8.	"Hero Is My Middle Name" (Cyndi Lauper and Rob Hyman)	3:15
9.	"Super Sea Star Savior" (Yolanda Adams)	4:44
10.	"Tomorrow Is" (The Flaming Lips)	3:31
11.	"Poor Pirates" (Sara Bareilles)	3:49
12.	"Bikini Bottom Boogie" (Steven Tyler and Joe Perry)	2:11
13.	"Chop to the Top" (Lady Antebellum)	2:26
14.	"(I Guess I) Miss You" (John Legend)	3:41
15.	"I'm Not a Loser" (They Might Be Giants)	4:38
16.	"Best Day Ever" (Andy Paley and Tom Kenny)	4:19
17.	"Bikini Bottom Day (Reprise)" (Jonathan Coulton)	2:04
18.	"SpongeBob SquarePants Theme Song" (Derek Drymon, Mark Harrison, Stephen Hillenburg and Blaise Smith)	0:47
Total length:		57:19

== Productions ==
=== Chicago try-out (2016) and Broadway (2017–18) ===
SpongeBob SquarePants opened at the Oriental Theatre, Chicago on June 19, 2016. The musical began previews on Broadway at the Palace Theatre on November 6, 2017, and opened on December 4, 2017, with choreography by Christopher Gattelli, musical supervision by Tom Kitt, music direction by Julie McBride, scenic and costume design by David Zinn, lighting design by Kevin Adams, projection design by Peter Nigrini, sound design by Walter Trarbach, and hair and wig design by Charles G. LaPointe. The musical closed on September 16, 2018, after 327 regular performances, without recouping its $18 million cost. The run was cut short due to the renovation of the Palace Theatre, with the theatre being raised 30 feet to make way for retail space below. The New York Times noted that the musical had been financially underperforming compared with other large-scale musicals, with it running strongest during school vacation periods and bringing in $1.5 million during Christmas week, with its lowest gross being $543,000 the last week of April.

=== National tours ===
A non-Equity North American tour opened on September 22, 2019, in Schenectady, New York, at Proctor's Theatre. It was later announced that the rest of the tour had been cancelled due to the COVID-19 pandemic, which forced theaters across the nation to close.

=== The SpongeBob Musical: Live On Stage! ===
On October 17, 2019, Nickelodeon announced it would air a television special of the show titled The SpongeBob Musical: Live On Stage!, to be filmed in front of a live audience and feature members of the original Broadway cast such as Ethan Slater, Danny Skinner, and Gavin Lee. On November 19, 2019, it was announced that Tom Kenny would reprise his series role as Patchy the Pirate for the special and that it would air on December 7, 2019. The production was released on DVD on November 3, 2020, and includes both the full-length version aired in December 2019 and the sing-along version aired in January 2020.

=== German Tour 2022 ===
A German-language tour through Germany, Austria and Switzerland started on October 1, 2022, in Berlin, hence becoming the first official public display of the show outside of North America. The show is co-produced by German Nickelodeon and Showslot, a German Musical production company. The Tour stops in several cities until closing on December 17, 2022. The production was translated to German entirely with no scenes cut. It also includes the preshow by Patchy the Pirate. However all the costumes and set were redesigned, with the center of the set design being a big pineapple that can be opened. Some set pieces of the original Broadway production were downscaled or cut to accommodate for the smaller stages of some venues.

=== UK Tour 2023 ===
On October 24, 2022, it was announced that the musical would premiere in the UK with a tour starting at the Mayflower Theatre in Southampton on April 5, 2023, and would include five weeks at the Queen Elizabeth Hall in London. The tour visited Birmingham, Bradford, Oxford, Dublin, Manchester, Belfast, Cardiff, Blackpool, Peterborough, Wolverhampton, Norwich, Leicester, Aberdeen and Plymouth, and concluded on September 9, 2023, at the Theatre Royal in Newcastle. The cast was announced on January 26, 2023.

=== Israeli Production 2024 ===
On June 6, 2024, it was announced that a Hebrew-speaking production of the musical, produced by The Hebrew Theatre, would premiere in Israel by the end of August 2024. It was also announced that the main characters of SpongeBob, Patrick, and Squidward would be portrayed by Ido Mosseri, Liron Barnes, and Gilad Kleter respectively, who are the original voice actors of the characters in the Hebrew dub of the animated TV show since its premiere in 2003, as they all have rich theatre acting experience. The cast said the original production team supervised the translated production closely, with high demands. A casting call was released the same day by the production director, Gadi Tzedka, with auditions planned for June 17–18 and official rehearsals planned to start July 1.

On July 4, 2024, a first look on the main trio costumes was shared on the official Nickelodeon Israel TikTok page, as Nickelodeon Israel kept providing social marketing for the production throughout the summer of 2024. On July 29, 2024, the production poster with the full billing was released. On August 12, 2024, a behind-the-scenes look into the recording session of the Hebrew version of the SpongeBob SquarePants theme song for the end of the musical, was shared online. On August 14, 2024, A clip featuring the Hebrew version of Chop To The Top was shared on Facebook by Amit Yagur Grossman, the actress playing Sandy Cheeks.

The premiere of the Israeli production was planned for August 25, 2024 at the HaTsafon Theatre in Haifa. However, that showing was canceled that morning due to security concerns from the developing events of the Israel–Hezbollah conflict. The musical premiered the following day, August 26, 2024, at the same venue. Then, the musical played multiple showings in different venues in Tel Aviv for the rest of August 2024, and is expected to have more showings in Tel Aviv in early September and late October, with an extra showing in Haifa planned for late October as well.

The production had some notable changes. Many props and set designs were created more literally (for example, an actual mountain set platform), unlike the original Broadway musical's implied props. The production utilized a large, flower-shaped LED screen in the middle of the stage showing custom-rendered visuals, without using any of SpongeBob's art assets, to support the story rather digitally than physically. The inclusion of the conductor in the acts was cut almost entirely, except for a gag with Squidward's clarinet at the end. All of the Patchy segments were cut, and some scenes were shortened to fit the show into a shorter runtime. Additionally, some Israeli elements were referenced in scenes, such as a reference by Karen and Plankton to Israel's representing song at the Eurovision Song Contest 2023, "Unicorn" by Noa Kirel. The role of Perch Perkins was replaced with pre-recorded clips of the real-life Israeli TV news anchor, Danny Kushmaro of Hevrat HaHadashot, while the song "No Control" was led by an ensemble actor.

=== Royal Caribbean 2027 ===
In October of 2026, it was announced that The SpongeBob Musical would headline the entertainment lineup onboard the newest and largest cruise ship in the world the Hero Of The Seas, opening in August 2027.

== Cast and characters ==
Character	Chicago try-out	Broadway	TV special	North American tour	German tour	UK Tour	Israel tour
Character	2016	2017	2019		2022	2023	2024
SpongeBob SquarePants	Ethan Slater	Ethan Slater	Ethan Slater	Lorenzo Pugliese	Michiel Janssens	Lewis Cornay	Ido Mosseri
Patrick Star	Danny Skinner	Danny Skinner	Danny Skinner	Beau Bradshaw	Benjamin Eberling	Irfan Damani	Liron Barnes
Sandy Cheeks	Lilli Cooper	Lilli Cooper	Christina Sajous	Daria Pilar Redus	Sarah Kornfeld / Mariyama Ebel	Chrissie Bhima	Amit Yagur
Squidward Q. Tentacles	Gavin Lee	Gavin Lee	Gavin Lee	Cody Cooley	Martijn Smids	Gareth Gates Tom Read Wilson	Gilad Kleter
Sheldon J. Plankton	Nick Blaemire	Wesley Taylor	Wesley Taylor	Tristan McIntyre	Maximilian Vogel	Divina de Campo	Nir Sheaber
Karen Plankton	Stephanie Hsu	Stephanie Hsu	Katie Lee Hill	Caitlin Ort	Pauline Schubert	Hannah Lowther	Yael Dover
Eugene Krabs	Carlos Lopez	Brian Ray Norris	Brian Ray Norris	Zach Kononov	Richard McCowen	Richard J Hunt	Asaf Segev
Pearl Krabs	Emmy Raver-Lampman	Jai'len Christine Li Josey	Jai'len Christine Li Josey	Méami Maszewski	Helena Lenn	Sarah Freer	Ariel Dimant
Patchy the Pirate	Jason Michael Snow	Jon Rua	Tom Kenny	Morgan Blanchard	Dani Spampinato		Cut
The Mayor	Gaelen Gilliland	Gaelen Gilliland	Bryonha Parham	Helen Regula	Mareike Heyen	Rebecca Lisewski	Gabriella Sternfeld
Perch Perkins	Kelvin Moon Loh	Kelvin Moon Loh	Kelvin Moon Loh	Richie Dupkin	Dominik Müller		Danny Kushmaro (prerecorded)^{1}
Mrs. Puff	Abby C. Smith	Abby C. Smith	Abby C. Smith	Natalie L. Chapman	Ellie van Gele	Eloise Davies	
Gary the Snail	Tom Kenny (prerecorded)	Allan K. Washington	Allan K. Washington	Dorian O'Brien	Marvin Klopfer / Ronja Geburzky		Tom Kenny (prerecorded)
Old Man Jenkins	Mark Ledbetter	JC Schuster	JC Schuster	Stephen C. Kallas	Niels Bouwmeester	Reece Kerridge	
Larry the Lobster	Allan K. Washington	Allan K. Washington	Allan K. Washington	Dorian O'Brien	Mathias Boeryd		
The Electric Skates	Curtis Holbrook; L'ogan J'ones; JC Schuster	Curtis Holbrook; L'ogan J'ones; Kyle Matthew Hamilton	Curtis Holbrook; L'ogan J'ones; Kyle Matthew Hamilton	Joshua Bess; Stefan Miller; Miles Davis Tillman	Dani Spampinato; Ronja Geburzky; Niels Bouwmeester	Eleanor Turiansky	
French Narrator	Mark Ledbetter	Tom Kenny (prerecorded)	Tom Kenny (prerecorded)	Kenneth Ferrone	Hans Rose	Alex Gaumond (pre-recorded)	Ido Mosseri (prerecorded)
Sardine Corps	Oneika Phillips, Jon Rua, Lauralyn McClelland, Robert Taylor Jr.			Elle-May Patterson, Sydney Simone, Ayana Strutz, Rico Velazquez	Carina Fitzi, Ronja Geburzky, Dani Spampinato, Pauline Schubert		

1. Danny Kushmaro has pre-recorded clips in the Channel 12 news studios delivering Perch Perkins' lines, and those clips were shown on screen in the live performances of the musical. However, he was not playing the character of Perch Perkins; he was playing himself, being a known news anchor in Israel. The ensemble actor leading "No Control" was referred to as Perch Perkins in the show.

Notable replacements

- Catherine Ricafort replaced Stephanie Hsu as Karen Plankton on June 19, 2018.
- Christina Sajous replaced Lilli Cooper as Sandy Cheeks on July 24, 2018.

== Critical response ==
The original Chicago production received mostly positive reviews. Dean Richards of WGN-TV gave it an A+, writing that "the story is multi-layered for kids and adults. It all adds up to one of the most fun, well produced, and best acted shows Chicago has seen in a long time." Chris Jones of the Chicago Tribune praised the cast (particularly Ethan Slater, Danny Skinner, Lilli Cooper, and Gavin Lee) and the production values. He wrote positively of the show's songs, writing that the musical's "biggest gamble—a score made up of singles by different songwriters and unified by orchestrator Tom Kitt—works quite beautifully." Nonetheless, he warned "the transition to Broadway now needs to involve a dialing back of excess and more attention to truth—Bikini Bottom truth, sure, but metaphoric human veracity." Similarly, Steve Oxman in Variety praised the entertainment, invention and "terrifically talented cast" but argued for a "slight shift in world view" to truly engage the broadest audience. In the Chicago Sun-Times' review, Hedy Weiss expressed praise for the set design's creativity and the coherency, but felt that it was almost too extravagant, writing that the "predictable" musical "exhausts itself long before it's over." Kendall Ashley of Nerdist described the set as "pretty darn impressive" and called the decision not to use extensive makeup on the actors "interesting." Barbara Vitello of the Daily Herald also commended the actors' costumes and performances, stating that the "imaginative costumes that add a punch of color to the glittering sea green and aquamarine backdrop are among the delights."

The Broadway production opened to similar reviews. Ben Brantley of The New York Times, called it a "ginormous giggle of a show", and particularly praised Slater's performance as the titular character. Marilyn Stasio of Variety stated the show provided a good amount of "giddy, goofy fun" for all audiences. Peter Marks of The Washington Post explained that, although the show displays "impressive design and engineering" along with "exuberant neon-colored sets and costumes", its "lumbering," "drawn-out" plot makes the show a novelty recommendable to only true fans of the source material. Alexis Soloski of The Guardian agreed, calling the main plot "bottom-feeder low" and subplots "roundly ignorable", resulting in a show that "is as perfunctorily entertaining as it is insistently forgettable."

== Awards and nominations ==
=== Original Broadway production ===
Year	Award Ceremony	Category	Nominee	Result
2018	Outer Critics Circle Awards	Outstanding New Broadway Musical		Won
2018	Outer Critics Circle Awards	Outstanding Book of a Musical (Broadway or Off-Broadway)	Kyle Jarrow	Nominated
2018	Outer Critics Circle Awards	Outstanding New Score (Broadway or Off-Broadway)	Yolanda Adams, Steven Tyler, Joe Perry, Sara Bareilles, Jonathan Coulton, Alex Ebert, The Flaming Lips, Lady Antebellum, Cyndi Lauper, Rob Hyman, John Legend, Panic! At the Disco, Plain White T's, They Might Be Giants, T.I., Domani, Lil' C, David Bowie, Brian Eno, Andy Paley, Tom Kenny, Derek Drymon, Mark Harrison, Stephen Hillenburg, Blaise Smith & Tom Kitt	Won
2018	Outer Critics Circle Awards	Outstanding Director of a Musical	Tina Landau	Won^{1}
2018	Outer Critics Circle Awards	Outstanding Actor in a Musical	Ethan Slater	Won
2018	Outer Critics Circle Awards	Outstanding Featured Actor in a Musical	Gavin Lee	Nominated
2018	Outer Critics Circle Awards	Outstanding Choreographer	Christopher Gattelli	Nominated
2018	Outer Critics Circle Awards	Outstanding Set Design (Play or Musical)	David Zinn	Nominated
2018	Outer Critics Circle Awards	Outstanding Costume Design (Play or Musical)	David Zinn	Nominated
2018	Outer Critics Circle Awards	Outstanding Lighting Design (Play or Musical)	Kevin Adams	Nominated
2018	Outer Critics Circle Awards	Outstanding Orchestrations	Tom Kitt	Nominated
2018	Drama League Awards	Outstanding Production of a Broadway or Off-Broadway Musical		Nominated
2018	Drama Desk Awards			
2018	Drama Desk Awards	Outstanding Musical		Won
2018	Drama Desk Awards	Outstanding Actor in a Musical	Ethan Slater	Won
2018	Drama Desk Awards	Outstanding Featured Actor in a Musical	Gavin Lee	Won
2018	Drama Desk Awards	Outstanding Director of a Musical	Tina Landau	Won
2018	Drama Desk Awards	Outstanding Choreography	Christopher Gattelli	Nominated
2018	Drama Desk Awards	Outstanding Book of a Musical	Kyle Jarrow	Nominated
2018	Drama Desk Awards	Outstanding Orchestrations	Tom Kitt	Nominated
2018	Drama Desk Awards	Outstanding Set Design for a Musical	David Zinn	Won
2018	Drama Desk Awards	Outstanding Costume Design for a Musical	David Zinn	Nominated
2018	Drama Desk Awards	Outstanding Projection Design	Peter Nigrini	Nominated
2018	Drama Desk Awards	Outstanding Wig and Hair Design	Charles G. LaPointe	Won
2018	Chita Rivera Awards for Dance and Choreography	Outstanding Choreography in a Broadway Show	Christopher Gattelli	Nominated
2018	Chita Rivera Awards for Dance and Choreography	Outstanding Ensemble in a Broadway Show		Nominated
2018	Chita Rivera Awards for Dance and Choreography	Outstanding Male Dancer in a Broadway Show	Gavin Lee	Nominated
2018	Tony Awards			
2018	Tony Awards	Best Musical		Nominated
2018	Tony Awards	Best Performance by an Actor in a Leading Role in a Musical	Ethan Slater	Nominated
2018	Tony Awards	Best Performance by an Actor in a Featured Role in a Musical	Gavin Lee	Nominated
2018	Tony Awards	Best Book of a Musical	Kyle Jarrow	Nominated
2018	Tony Awards	Best Original Score	Yolanda Adams, Sara Bareilles, Jonathan Coulton, Domani, Alex Ebert, The Flaming Lips, Rob Hyman, Lady Antebellum, Cyndi Lauper, John Legend, Lil'C, Panic! at the Disco, Plain White T's, Joe Perry, They Might Be Giants, T.I. & Steven Tyler	Nominated
2018	Tony Awards	Best Direction of a Musical	Tina Landau	Nominated
2018	Tony Awards	Best Orchestrations	Tom Kitt	Nominated
2018	Tony Awards	Best Choreography	Christopher Gattelli	Nominated
2018	Tony Awards	Best Sound Design of a Musical	Walter Trarbach and Mike Dobson	Nominated
2018	Tony Awards	Best Scenic Design of a Musical	David Zinn	Won
2018	Tony Awards	Best Costume Design of a Musical	David Zinn	Nominated
2018	Tony Awards	Best Lighting Design of a Musical	Kevin Adams	Nominated
2018	Theatre World Award		Ethan Slater	Honoree

^{1} Tied with Bartlett Sher for My Fair Lady
