= HaHadashot (TV series) =

The Central News Bulletin of Hevrat HaHadashot (Hebrew: מהדורת החדשות המרכזית של חברת החדשות), branded on-screen as HaHadashot (Hebrew: החדשות, lit. 'The News'), and formerly as HaHadashot 2 (Hebrew: החדשות 2, lit. 'The [Channel] 2 News'), is the flagship, evening television news bulletin broadcast at 7:50pm IST, produced by Israel Television News Company since 4 November 1993. It overtook the viewing rates of Mabat LaHadashot and became the most-watched news program in Israel. It usually lasts for 100 minutes.

The bulletin is also simulcast on some radio stations such as Israeli Army Radio.

It was broadcast on Channel 2 until 31 October 2017. Since Channel 2 split into two channels on 1 November 2017 until 15 January 2019, the bulletin was simulcast on Keshet 12 and Reshet 13. Following the merger between Reshet and Channel 10 that took effect on 16 January 2019, the bulletin is exclusively broadcast on Keshet 12; Reshet took the resources and programmes from Channel 10's news production company (which subsequently changed its on-air branding to HaHadashot 13).

Yonit Levi is the main presenter of the bulletin, alternately presenting the news with Danny Kushmaro and Keren Marciano.
