= 2022–2023 opinion polling for the 2026 Israeli legislative election =

In the run up to the 2026 Israeli legislative election, various organisations are conducting opinion polling to gauge voting intention in Israel during the term of the twenty-fifth Knesset. This article lists the results of such polls between 23 December 2022 and 28 December 2023. In keeping with the election silence law, no polls may be published from the end of the Friday before the election until the polling stations close on election day at 22:00.

Polls are listed in reverse chronological order, showing the most recent first and using the dates when the survey fieldwork was done, as opposed to the date of publication. Where the fieldwork dates are unknown, the date of publication is given instead.

== Seat projections ==
This section displays voting intention estimates referring to the next Knesset election. The figures listed are Knesset seat counts rather than percentages, unless otherwise stated. Scenario polls are not included here.

=== Guide to the table ===
Parties that fall below the electoral threshold of 3.25% are normally denoted by the percentage of votes that they received, shown in parentheses, e.g. (1.2%), rather than by the number of seats they would have received. If a poll has no information on a particular party, or states that it does not meet the electoral threshold without providing details, that party is instead marked by a dash (–).

The party receiving the highest number of projected seats has its figure displayed in bold with the background shaded in the party's colour. In the case of a tie, the parties tying for the highest number of projected seats have their figures displayed in bold with the backgrounds shaded in their colours.

The 37th government parties and alliances (Likud, Religious Zionist Party, Otzma Yehudit, Shas, and United Torah Judaism) are highlighted. The sum of their projected seats is shown in the column headed "Gov." If that sum constitutes a majority of the Knesset (61 or more seats), it is highlighted and bolded.

=== Polls ===
Fieldwork date	Polling firm	Publisher	Likud	Yesh Atid	RZP	Otzma	National Unity	Shas	UTJ	Yisrael Beiteinu	Ra'am	Hadash –Ta'al	Labor	Meretz	Balad	Lead	Gov.
28 Dec	CF+MP+SN	Channel 13	16	15	5	8	**38**	9	7	8	6	4	–	4	–	22	45
27–28 Dec	LRI+P4A	Maariv	17	13	4	7	**38**	9	7	11	5	5	(1.3%)	4	(1.4%)	21	44
21 Dec	SF+DP	Channel 14	27	14	4	8	**28**	10	7	11	6	5	(0.5%)	(2.9%)	(1.6%)	1	56
20–21 Dec	LRI+P4A	Maariv	18	13	4	7	**38**	9	7	10	5	5	(1.2%)	4	(1.5%)	20	45
18 Dec	Midgam R&C	HaHadashot 12	18	15	(2.4%)	8	**37**	11	7	9	5	5	(1.8%)	5	(1.9%)	19	44
13–14 Dec	LRI+P4A	Maariv	17	14	4	7	**39**	8	7	9	5	5	(2.2%)	5	(1.8%)	22	43
11 Dec	CF+MP+SN	Channel 13	18	15	5	7	**37**	9	7	8	5	5	–	4	–	19	46
6–7 Dec	LRI+P4A	Maariv	18	15	4	6	**38**	9	7	10	4	5	(1.4%)	4	(1.4%)	20	44
1 Dec	LRI+P4A	Maariv	20	14	(2.8%)	7	**40**	9	7	10	4	5	(1.6%)	4	(1.2%)	20	43
22–23 Nov	LRI+P4A	Maariv	18	13	(2.5%)	7	**43**	9	7	8	5	5	(2.2%)	5	(1.3%)	25	41
16 Nov	Midgam R&C	HaHadashot 12	17	15	4	7	**36**	10	7	9	5	5	(1.5%)	5	(1.7%)	19	45
16 Nov	Midgam R&C	HaHadashot 12	16	16	TBA	TBA	**29**	TBA	TBA	11	5	5	9		–	13	45
15–16 Nov	LRI+P4A	Maariv	17	14	4	6	**42**	8	7	8	5	5	(1.4%)	4	(1.3%)	25	42
8–9 Nov	LRI+P4A	Maariv	18	14	4	5	**40**	9	7	9	5	5	(1.1%)	4	(1.0%)	22	43
1–2 Nov	LRI+P4A	Maariv	18	15	4	5	**39**	8	7	8	5	5	(1.4%)	6	(1.0%)	21	42
25–26 Oct	LRI+P4A	Maariv	19	17	5	4	**36**	8	7	8	5	5	(1.2%)	6	(1.2%)	17	43
18–19 Oct	LRI+P4A	Maariv	18	15	5	5	**40**	8	7	7	4	5	(2.0%)	6	(1.8%)	22	43
12 Oct	National Unity joins an emergency wartime government and the Israeli war cabinet																
11–12 Oct	LRI+P4A	Maariv	19	15	4	5	**41**	7	7	6	5	5	(1.3%)	6	(1.5%)	22	42
7 Oct	October 7 attacks; the Gaza war begins																
4–5 Oct	LRI+P4A	Maariv	28	16	6	4	**29**	10	7	6	5	5	(2.1%)	4	(1.9%)	1	55
27–28 Sep	LRI+P4A	Maariv	**28**	17	5	4	**28**	10	7	6	5	5	(1.1%)	5	(1.5%)	Tie	54
26 Sep	CF+MP+SN	Channel 13	26	16	6	4	**27**	10	7	6	5	5	–	4	4	1	53
26 Sep	Midgam R&C	HaHadashot 12	**28**	18	9		27	10	7	6	5	5	(2.5%)	5	(2.8%)	1	54
26 Sep	Kantar	Kan 11	27	18	9		**30**	10	7	5	5	5	(2.9%)	4	(1.8%)	3	53
21 Sep	SF+DP	Channel 14	**31**	16	5	5	27	10	7	6	5	4	(1.8%)	4	(2.6%)	4	58
20–21 Sep	LRI+P4A	Maariv	26	16	5	5	**31**	10	7	6	5	5	(1.4%)	4	(1.7%)	5	53
14 Sep	SF+DP	Channel 14	**30**	16	4	5	28	10	7	7	5	4	(2.0%)	4	(3.0%)	2	56
13–14 Sep	LRI+P4A	Maariv	27	16	5	5	**31**	9	7	6	5	5	(1.7%)	4	(1.5%)	4	53
13 Sep	CF+MP+SN	Channel 13	25	18	6	5	**28**	10	7	6	6	5	–	4	–	3	53
10 Sep	Midgam R&C	HaHadashot 12	26	18	9		**29**	10	7	6	5	5	(2.8%)	5	(1.7%)	3	52
7 Sep	LRI+P4A	Maariv	26	17	6	4	**30**	10	7	5	6	5	(1.8%)	4	(1.6%)	4	53
6 Sep	SF+DP	Channel 14	**30**	15	6	5	28	10	7	7	4	4	(2.1%)	4	(2.0%)	2	58
4 Sep	CF+MP+SN	Channel 13	25	20	6	5	**26**	10	7	6	6	5	–	4	–	1	53
31 Aug	SF+DP	Channel 14	**31**	15	5	5	26	10	6	8	5	5	(1.3%)	4	(2.2%)	5	57
30–31 Aug	LRI+P4A	Maariv	27	17	5	4	**31**	10	7	5	5	5	(2.1%)	4	(2.4%)	4	53
24–25 Aug	LRI+P4A	Maariv	27	16	6	4	**30**	10	7	5	5	6	(1.6%)	4	(2.1%)	3	54
16–17 Aug	LRI+P4A	Maariv	28	15	5	5	**31**	10	7	5	5	5	(1.7%)	4	(1.4%)	3	55
9–10 Aug	Lazar	Maariv	28	16	6	4	**29**	9	7	6	5	5	(1.8%)	5	(2.2%)	1	54
4 Aug	Midgam R&C	HaHadashot 12	26	20	9		**28**	10	7	6	5	5	(1.6%)	4	(1.9%)	2	52
4 Aug	Midgam R&C	HaHadashot 12	25	20	4	6	**28**	10	7	6	5	5	–	4	–	3	52
3 Aug	SF+DP	Channel 14	**30**	16	5	5	25	10	7	7	5	5	(1.2%)	5	(2.6%)	5	57
3 Aug	The Religious Zionist Party and The Jewish Home merge																
2–3 Aug	Lazar	Maariv	27	16	5	5	**30**	9	7	5	6	5	(2.8%)	5	(1.8%)	3	53
26–27 Jul	Maagar Mochot	Israel Hayom	27	21	9		**28**	10	7	4	5	4	(2.75%)	5	(2.17%)	1	53
25–26 Jul	Lazar	Maariv	28	16	5	5	**30**	9	7	5	6	4	(2.1%)	5	(2.2%)	2	54
25 Jul	Midgam R&C	HaHadashot 12	**28**	19	8		**28**	10	7	6	5	5	(2.1%)	4	(2.6%)	Tie	53
25 Jul	CF+MP+SN	Channel 13	25	17	5	5	**30**	10	7	6	6	5	–	4	–	5	52
24 Jul	SF+DP	Channel 14	**31**	14	5	5	28	9	7	7	5	5	(2.5%)	4	(2.6%)	3	57
23 Jul	Kantar	Kan 11	27	17	10		**30**	9	7	5	5	5	(3.1%)	5	–	3	53
20 Jul	CF+MP+SN	Channel 13	26	21	6	5	**29**	9	7	6	6	5	–	–	–	3	53
19–20 Jul	Lazar	Maariv	28	17	5	5	**29**	9	7	5	5	5	(2.5%)	5	(2.1%)	1	54
13 Jul	SF+DP	Channel 14	**30**	14	5	6	28	9	7	7	5	5	(2.5%)	4	(2.7%)	2	57
13 Jul	Lazar	Maariv	**28**	18	5	5	26	9	7	6	5	6	(1.8%)	5	(1.9%)	2	54
13 Jul	CF+MP+SN	Channel 13	25	21	5	5	**27**	9	7	6	7	4	–	4	–	2	51
9 Jul	Kantar	Kan 11	28	17	9		**29**	10	7	6	5	5	–	4	–	1	54
9 Jul	Midgam R&C	HaHadashot 12	**28**	20	9		26	10	7	6	5	5	(1.6%)	4	(2.8%)	2	54
5 Jul	Lazar	Maariv	**29**	20	5	5	26	9	7	5	5	5	(1.4%)	4	(2.1%)	3	55
5 Jul	CF+MP+SN	Channel 13	**26**	18	7	6	**26**	10	7	6	6	4	–	4	–	Tie	56
29 Jun	SF+DP	Channel 14	**30**	14	5	5	28	10	7	8	5	4	(2.5%)	4	(3.0%)	2	57
28–29 Jun	Panels Politics	Maariv	27	19	5	5	**28**	9	7	5	5	6	(1.7%)	4	(1.95%)	1	53
25 Jun	Midgam R&C	HaHadashot 12	27	18	10		**28**	10	7	6	6	4	(1.6%)	4	(2.9%)	1	54
25 Jun	CF+MP+SN	Channel 13	24	20	6	5	**28**	10	7	6	6	4	–	4	–	4	52
21–22 Jun	Panels Politics	Maariv	26	17	5	4	**30**	9	7	6	5	6	(2.2%)	5	(2.0%)	4	51
15 Jun	Panels Politics	Maariv	24	17	5	5	**32**	9	7	5	5	6	(1.7%)	5	(1.5%)	8	50
15 Jun	CF+MP+SN	Channel 13	24	17	5	5	**28**	9	7	6	6	5	–	4	4	4	50
15 Jun	SF+DP	Channel 14	**28**	14	5	6	**28**	10	7	8	5	5	(2.5%)	4	(2.6%)	Tie	56
15 Jun	Midgam R&C	HaHadashot 12	**27**	18	10		**27**	10	7	6	5	5	(1.8%)	5	(2.7%)	Tie	54
11–12 Jun	Smith Consulting	Amit Segal	26	18	6	5	**28**	10	7	5	6	5	–	4	–	2	54
11 Jun	CF+MP+SN	Channel 13	24	19	6	5	**28**	10	7	5	6	6	–	4	–	4	52
11 Jun	CF+MP+SN	Channel 13	24	17	6	5	**27**	10	7	5	6	6	7		–	3	52
8 Jun	SF+DP	Channel 14	**31**	15	5	5	26	10	7	7	5	5	(1.8%)	4	(2.6%)	5	58
7–8 Jun	Panels Politics	Maariv	26	18	6	4	**31**	9	7	6	5	5	(2.0%)	4	(1.8%)	5	52
1 Jun	Midgam R&C	Arutz Sheva	26	18	5	6	**28**	10	7	6	6	4	–	4	–	2	54
31 May – 1 Jun	Panels Politics	Maariv	26	18	6	4	**29**	9	7	6	5	6	(2.6%)	4	(2.2%)	3	52
31 May – 1 Jun	Panels Politics	Maariv	26	15	6	5	**28**	9	7	6	5	5	8		(2.2%)	2	53
30 May	Midgam R&C	HaHadashot 12	26	18	10		**28**	10	7	6	6	4	(1.7%)	5	(2.1%)	2	53
30 May	Midgam R&C	HaHadashot 12	26	18	4	6	**28**	10	7	6	6	4	(1.7%)	5	(2.1%)	2	53
24 May	Panels Politics	Maariv	**27**	18	6	5	**27**	9	7	6	4	6	(2.5%)	5	(1.8%)	Tie	54
24 May	CF+MP+SN	Channel 13	25	18	5	4	**29**	9	7	4	6	5	–	4	4	4	50
17–18 May	Panels Politics	Maariv	25	16	7	5	**28**	9	8	6	5	6	(2%)	5	(1.8%)	3	54
14 May	Midgam R&C	HaHadashot 12	**27**	18	10		**27**	10	7	6	5	5	(1.3%)	5	(1.7%)	Tie	54
14 May	Midgam R&C	HaHadashot 12	**27**	18	4	6	**27**	10	7	6	5	5	(1.3%)	5	(1.7%)	Tie	54
14 May	Kantar	Kan 11	**28**	18	10		26	10	7	6	5	5	(1.5%)	5	(2.2%)	2	55
14 May	SF+DP	Channel 14	**31**	16	5	5	27	10	7	6	5	4	(2.2%)	4	(2.8%)	4	58
14 May	CF+MP+SN	Channel 13	25	18	8	5	**30**	10	8	5	6	5	–	–	–	3	56
12 May	Panels Politics	Maariv	**27**	17	5	4	**27**	10	8	6	4	6	(2.2%)	6	(1.9%)	Tie	54
7 May	CF+MP+SN	Channel 13	24	19	7	4	**29**	10	7	6	5	5	–	4	–	5	52
7 May	Midgam R&C	HaHadashot 12	24	18	11		**29**	10	7	6	5	5	(2.5%)	5	(2.1%)	5	52
7 May	Midgam R&C	HaHadashot 12	23	18	5	7	**29**	10	7	6	5	5	(2.5%)	5	(2.1%)	6	52
4–5 May	Panels Politics	Maariv	25	17	5	5	**31**	10	8	6	4	5	(2.9%)	4	(2.4%)	6	53
30 Apr	CF+MP+SN	Channel 13	22	18	6	5	**28**	9	7	6	5	5	–	5	4	6	49
30 Apr	SF+DP	Channel 14	**31**	14	5	4	28	11	7	6	5	5	(1.9%)	4	(2.8%)	3	58
30 Apr	Kantar	Kan 11	25	18	9		**30**	10	7	6	5	6	(2.5%)	4	(2.6%)	5	51
26–27 Apr	Panels Politics	Maariv	23	17	6	4	**28**	10	7	6	5	6	4	4	(2.2%)	5	50
21 Apr	Panels Politics	Maariv	26	19	5	5	**27**	9	7	6	4	6	(2.6%)	6	–	1	52
16 Apr	SF+DP	Channel 14	**30**	14	5	4	29	10	8	6	5	5	(1.7%)	4	(2.6%)	1	57
16 Apr	Midgam R&C	HaHadashot 12	24	20	11		**28**	10	7	5	5	5	(2.6%)	5	(2.8%)	4	52
16 Apr	Midgam R&C	HaHadashot 12	24	18	11		**26**	10	7	5	5	5	9		(2.8%)	2	52
13 Apr	Panels Politics	Maariv	**26**	19	5	4	**26**	9	7	6	4	6	4	4	(2.3%)	Tie	51
9 Apr	CF+MP+SN	Channel 13	20	21	11		**29**	9	6	5	5	6	4	–	4	8	46
4–5 Apr	Panels Politics	Maariv	**25**	20	6	6	**25**	10	7	6	4	6	(2.6%)	5	(1.8%)	Tie	54
2 Apr	SF+DP	Channel 14	**31**	17	5	5	24	10	7	7	5	5	(2.5%)	4	(2.9%)	7	58
28 Mar	SF+DP	Channel 14	**30**	19	6	5	23	10	7	6	5	5	(2.5%)	4	(1.9%)	7	58
27 Mar	Kantar	Kan 11	**25**	22	11		21	10	7	5	6	5	4	4	(3.1%)	3	53
27 Mar	Midgam R&C	HaHadashot 12	**25**	22	12		23	10	7	6	5	5	(3.1%)	5	(2.1%)	2	54
26 Mar	CF+MP+SN	Channel 13	**28**	24	11		18	9	7	5	5	5	4	–	4	4	55
22–23 Mar	Panels Politics	Maariv	**28**	26	5	6	19	10	7	5	4	5	(2.6%)	5	–	2	56
16 Mar	CF+MP+SN	Channel 13	**28**	27	13		13	10	7	6	6	5	5	–	–	1	58
16 Mar	Midgam R&C	HaHadashot 12	**29**	23	12		17	10	7	6	6	5	(3.0%)	5	(1.0%)	6	58
16 Mar	SF+DP	Channel 14	**32**	23	6	6	15	11	7	6	5	5	(2.8%)	4	(2.7%)	9	**62**
16 Mar	Kantar	Kan 11	**28**	24	12		17	11	7	6	6	5	(2.9%)	4	(2.6%)	4	58
15–16 Mar	Panels Politics	Maariv	**29**	24	6	5	16	9	8	6	4	4	4	5	–	5	57
8–9 Mar	Panels Politics	Maariv	**27**	25	5	7	16	10	7	6	4	5	4	4	–	2	56
5 Mar	SF+DP	Channel 14	**32**	22	6	6	15	11	7	7	5	5	(2.9%)	4	(2.9%)	10	**62**
5 Mar	CF+MP+SN	Channel 13	**28**	27	12		14	9	7	6	6	5	6	–	–	1	56
28 Feb	Midgam R&C	HaHadashot 12	**29**	26	12		14	11	7	6	6	5	(2.8%)	4	(2.0%)	3	59
26–27 Feb	Kantar	Kan 11	**29**	26	13		15	10	7	5	6	5	(3.1%)	4	(3.0%)	3	59
24 Feb	Panels Politics	Maariv	26	**27**	5	7	19	10	7	5	(2.6%)	5	5	4	(2.1%)	1	55
22 Feb	SF+DP	Channel 14	**31**	23	7	7	13	11	8	6	5	5	4	(3.2%)	–	8	**64**
20 Feb	CF+MP+SN	Channel 13	**27**	26	12		14	10	7	5	6	5	4	–	4	1	56
3 Feb	Midgam R&C	HaHadashot 12	**30**	24	14		14	11	7	6	5	5	(2.4%)	4	(1.8%)	6	**62**
2 Feb	SF+DP	Channel 14	**30**	24	6	8	12	12	8	6	5	5	4	–	–	6	**64**
26 Jan	Panels Politics	Maariv	**31**	27	5	8	15	9	7	5	(2.0%)	4	4	5	(2.4%)	4	60
1 Jan	CF+MP+SN	Channel 13	**31**	26	12		12	8	7	6	6	4	4	4	–	5	58
29 Dec 2022	The thirty-seventh government of Israel is sworn in																
23 Dec 2022	Panels Politics	Maariv	**35**	26	12		10	9	8	4	4	–	4	4	4	9	**64**
1 Nov 2022	**2022 legislative election**		**32**	24	14		12	11	7	6	5	5	4	(3.16%)	(2.91%)	8	**64**
