= Yonit Levi =

Israeli radio and television personality

Yonit Levi יונית לוי
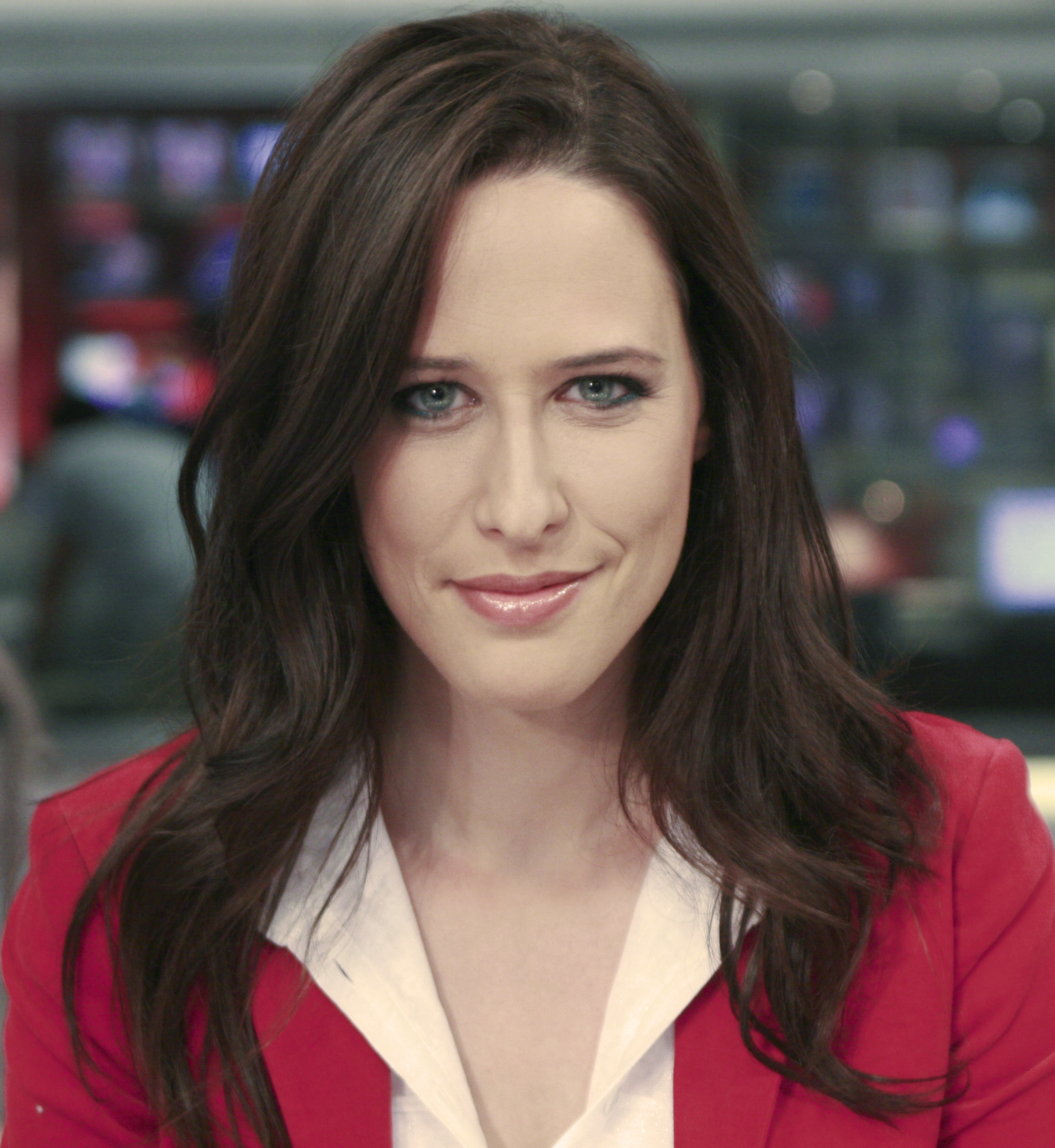
- Born: 12 July 1977 (age 49); Jerusalem, Israel
- Education: Hebrew University of Jerusalem, Tel Aviv University
- Occupations: news anchor, television presenter, journalist
- Years active: 1996–present
- Employer: Hevrat HaHadashot
- Spouse: Ido Rosenblum (m. 2011)
- Children: 3

Yonit Levi (Hebrew: יונית לוי; born 12 July 1977) is an Israeli news anchor, television presenter, podcaster, and journalist.

== Biography ==
Yonit Levi was born in the settlement of French Hill, East Jerusalem, to an Ashkenazi Jewish family. Her father, Yoram, was born in the USSR, and her mother, Neomi, was born in Romania. She lived with her parents in Chicago for a few years, where she attended Bernard Zell Anshe Emet Day School.

From 1999 to 2002, Levi was reportedly in a relationship with Ya'akov Eilon. In October 2011, Levi married screenwriter and television host Ido Rosenblum in a private ceremony in their Tel Aviv apartment. Their son was born in November 2013, followed by a daughter in December 2015, and a second daughter in May 2018. The family resides in Tel Aviv.

== Media career ==
Levi is the chief news anchor of the flagship bulletin on Keshet 12. After finishing her army service as foreign news editor for the Army Radio (Galei Tzahal, IDF Radio), Levi joined Israel Television News Company in 1998. In 2002, the former anchors Ya'akov Eilon and Miki Haimovich moved to Channel 10, and at age 25, Levi was chosen as the anchor of Channel 2's prime time news program. A few years later, when her co-anchor resigned, she became the first woman in Israel to be appointed the sole anchor position of a prime-time newscast on a commercial channel. She has also served as the channel's field reporter for such international stories as the Yugoslav Wars, the 2011 Tōhoku earthquake and tsunami, the aftermath of the September 11 attacks, U.S. elections, and the Israeli withdrawal from and subsequent wars in Gaza. Under Levi, the prime time news on Channel 2 remained the most watched Israeli daily program.

In January 2008, Levi conducted an interview with U.S. President George W. Bush at the White House. In July 2010, Levi interviewed U.S. President Barack Obama at the White House.

In 2015, Levi gave a rare interview to American journalist Charlie Rose of PBS, expressing personal opinions on Israeli current events.

In September 2018, when Monica Lewinsky spoke at a conference in Jerusalem, she sat for a Q&A session with Yonit Levi. The first question Levi asked was whether Lewinsky thought Bill Clinton owed her a private apology. Lewinsky refused to answer the question, and walked off the stage. She later tweeted that the question was posed in a pre-event meeting with Levi, and Lewinsky told her that such a question was off limits. A spokesman for the Israel Television News Company, which hosted the conference and is Levi's employer, responded that Levi had kept all the agreements she made with Lewinsky and honored her requests.

Since December 2021 Levi has been a cohost of the podcast “Unholy: Two Jews on the News” with The Guardian journalist Jonathan Freedland.

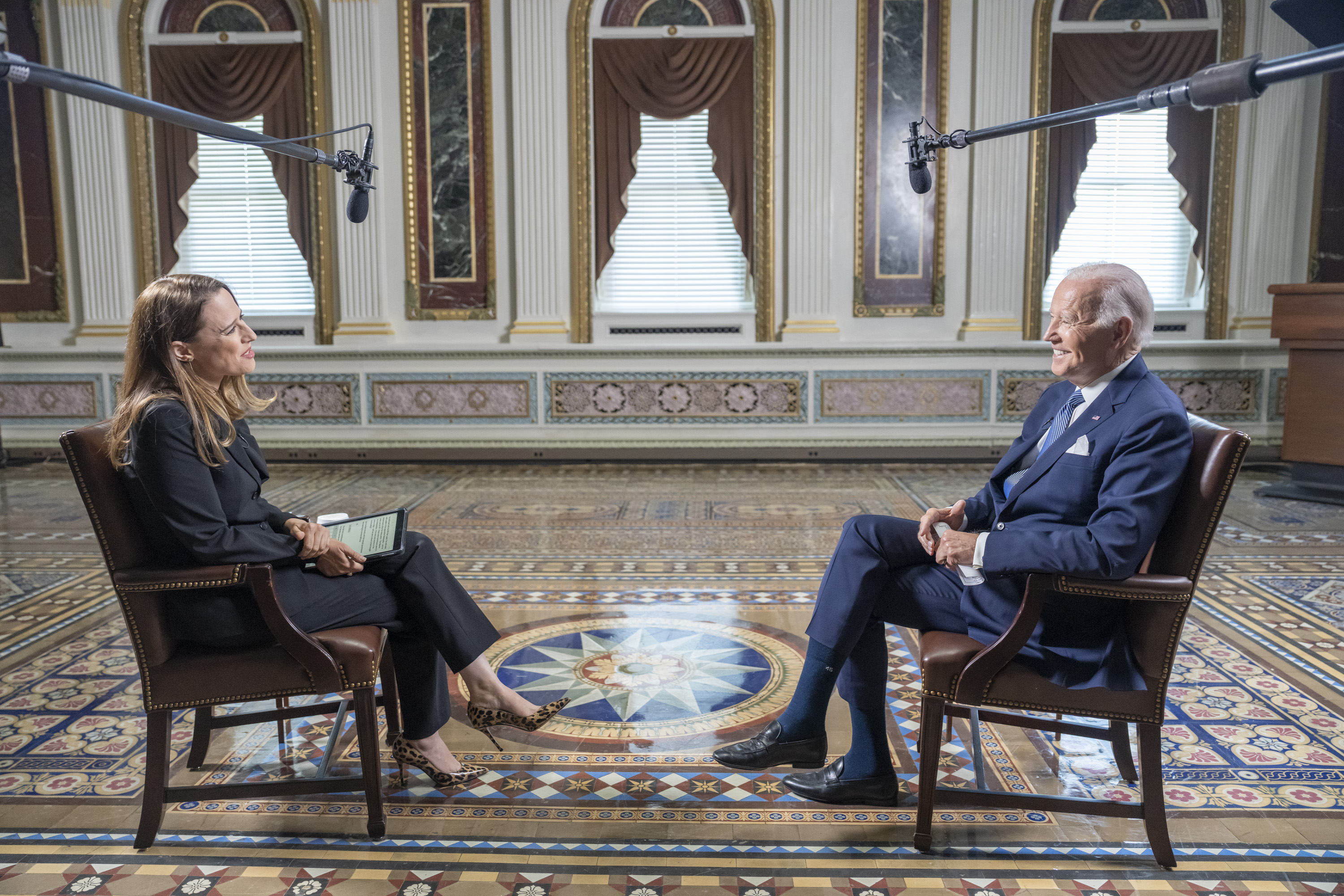
Levi interviewing U.S. President Joe Biden

In 2022, Levi conducted an interview with U.S. President Joe Biden at the White House.

In August 2025, she and American news anchor Bianna Golodryga published a children's book, Don't Feed the Lion, about antisemitism.

== See also ==
- Women in journalism and media professions
- Women in Israel
- Journalism in Israel
