= Shopping Channel (Israel) =

The Shopping Channel (ערוץ הקניות) was an Israeli television channel specialized in the sale of consumer products. The channel was available at closing time on all five pay television providers (Hot, Yes, Cellcom TV, Partner TV and STINGTV). It closed down on 25 June 2024.

== History ==
The franchise for the channel was granted in April 1995 for a six-year period, with an option to extend it for another six years, to a group of investors who won a tender in which 4 groups competed. The winning group included: Darf Advertising, Export Investments, Globus Group, Clal-Sahar, Ishal, Ari Stimatsky, Gad Proper, the "Eske Tova" catalog company, and the American shopping channel VIATV. After the channel accumulated a loss of approximately NIS 43 million in the first two years of its operation, most of the investors sold their shares to Daf Advertising Company which held 80% of the shares. In 1999, the channel announced the establishment of a national chain of stores, after having already operated points of sale in Jaffa, Jerusalem and Be'er Sheva where they mainly sold surpluses that were not sold as part of the broadcasts on the channel.

In 2002, the channel petitioned the High Court against the Cable and Satellite Broadcasting Council to prevent the granting of licenses to competing channels, not on the basis of a tender and concession as required of the shopping channel. Then it withdrew the petition. In 2005, two competing channels were finally launched, Netaction on channel 333, which was based on Netaction's online shopping site Netvision, and channel 444 TVmall. Both channels stopped broadcasting after less than two years.

In January 2007, the Shopping Channel requested an extension to its broadcasting franchise, but the Minister of Communications, Ariel Atias, decided not to extend the franchise according to the recommendation of the Cable and Satellite Council, according to which the channel's broadcasting should be transferred to a license format and not on a time-limited franchise basis. In February 2008, it was finally agreed to extend the franchise for another 10 years.

In 2014, the channel was rebranded and started broadcasting in HD quality.

On 25 July 2024, after nearly 30 years of the channel's broadcasts on television, the Shopping Channel stopped its broadcasts, justifying its closure on the lack of adapting to the new television market, but continued its full activity through its website until the channel's website was also closed permanently on 30 October.
