= Danny Kushmaro =

Israeli journalist and on-site reporter, news anchor, and television host

- דני קושמרו
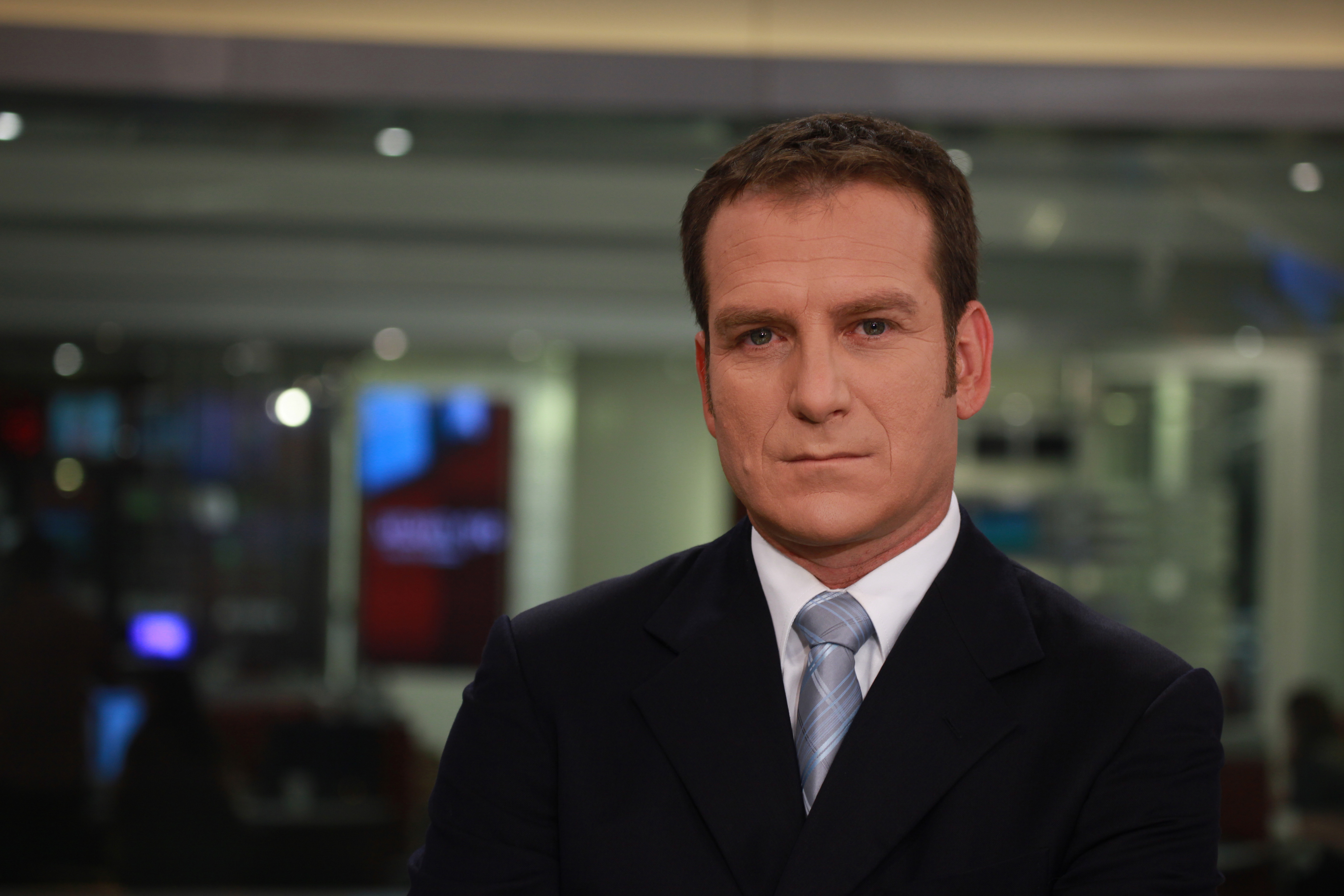
- Kushamro in 2010
- Born: May 1968 (age 58); Be'er Sheva, Israel
- Other name: Dany Cushmaro
- Education: Ben Gurion University of the Negev
- Occupations: Journalist, news anchor, television host
- Years active: 1996–present
- Television: Hadashot 12 (N12/Keshet 12/mako)

Danny Kushmaro (Hebrew: דני קושמרו; born May 1968) is an Israeli journalist, news anchor, and television host.

== Early life, family and education ==
Kushmaro was born in Be'er Sheva, Israel, and studied engineering and business administration at the Ben-Gurion University of the Negev.

He is an avid motorcyclist as well as other extreme sports practitioner. In June 2018, he was severely injured in motorbike accident at Modena, Italy.

== Media and journalism career ==
Kushmaro started his career presenting at a local radio station in 1996. In 2001, he moved to the Israeli News Company. From 2003 to 2013, he presented Channel 2's Saturday news magazine. In 2008, he became the evening anchorman after Gadi Sukenik left. He and Yonit Levi alternately host the main news broadcast on weekdays.

On 1 February 2003, he covered the landing of Space Shuttle Columbia, expected to bring Israel's first astronaut, Ilan Ramon, back to Earth after a lengthy mission. Ramon's father, Eliezer Wolferman, was present in the studio. During the initially festive broadcast, NASA lost contact with the shuttle's crew. After this was clear, Wolferman was sent out of the studio away from camera.

In 2017, he interviewed white supremacist Richard Spencer. Afterwards, one viewer published the phone number of the Israeli News Company, so others could criticise the channel for interviewing a neo-Nazi.

In 2018, he covered the torch lighting ceremony on Mount Herzl, the Great March of Return and the inauguration of the US Embassy in Jerusalem.

On 26 October 2024, during the Lebanon war, a video was released in Channel 2 News, showing Kushmaro accompanying the Israel Defense Forces in southern Lebanon. As part of the visit, he symbolically pressed a button that triggered the demolition of a building identified by the IDF as being used by Hezbollah terrorists. The event took place within the framework of Israel’s military campaign against Hezbollah. No civilians were injured or harmed in the incident.
