= Channel 9 (Israel) =

Television station in Israel

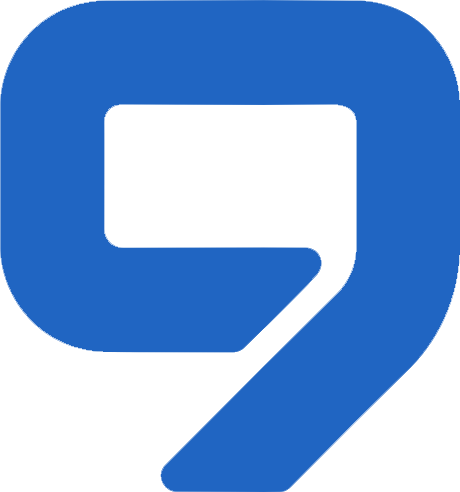
- Type: Russian language
- Availability: Israel
- Headquarters: Neve Ilan, Israel
- Launch date: November 2002
- Official website: www.9tv.co.il

Former logo (with former Israel Plus name)

Channel 9 (Russian: 9 канал, IPA: [ˈdʲevʲɪtʲ kɐˈnaɫ]) is a television station in Israel, formerly known as Israel Plus (Russian: Израиль Плюс). It primarily broadcasts in the Russian language usually with Hebrew subtitles. It also broadcasts some shows in Hebrew with Russian subtitles. The channel is aimed at the one million plus Russian speakers who have immigrated to the country since 1990. It was rebranded as Channel 9 (9 Kanal), the channel on which it is broadcast on cable and satellite. It is available in North America via free-to-air satellite on Galaxy 25..

The TV Channel also operates a news site 9tv.co.il and is present at different media platforms (YouTube, Telegram, Facebook, etc.).

== History ==
=== Background ===
In 1997, the government approved the report of the Yossi Peled committee, set up to create a proposal to expand and reorganize the public broadcasting system. The report recommended the adoption of a new policy to create a free market for electronic media, based on the principle of an "open sky" for everyone. The committee recommended licenses for direct-to-home satellite television (Yes), the creation of a new private terrestrial channel (which would become (Channel 10), and the creation of five or six dedicated cable channels: an Arabic service, a Russian channel, an Amharic channel for Ethiopians in Israel, a channel for Israeli culture (which would become Channel 20, now conservative channel Now 14), an Israeli music channel (Channel 24) and a news channel, all of which financed by commercial advertising.

In 1998, the Ministry of Communications, by means of the Cable and Satellite Broadcasting Council, did the preliminary selection of the five channels (the Amharic channel was excluded from the initial plan). The decision included Al-Hala TV (Arabic), a news channel, a Russian channel, a music channel (Channel 24) and a cultural heritage channel. However, after the initial preliminary bidding, the plan for the Russian channel was delayed for several years.

=== Bid ===
The bid was published in January 2001, and in May 2001, received proposals from two groups. On 12 September 2001, the Cable and Satellite Broadcasting Council announced the winner of the tender, led by Africa Israel Investments, a financial group headed by Lev Leviev. The company was known as Vash Telekanal (Your (TV) Channel) and was composed of the following shareholders: Africa Israel Investments (40%), Marlaz (20%), IGB (19,5%), Jerusalem Capital Studios and Elrom Studios (8,25%), Mega TV (5,75%), senior staff members (5,5%) and Mapal Communications (1%). Yulia was the channel's CEO and Pini Cohen, Africa Israel's CEO, was the project's coordinator.

=== Going on air ===
In November 2001, Vash Telekanal announced that it would be operational from May 2002 under the name Israel Plus. According to the CSBC license conditions, the channel would be carried exclusively on cable and satellite, and would be financed by advertising (12 minutes per hour) and sales of the content it produces. It was also stipulated that in an initial two-year period, the channel would broadcast for twelve hours a day, expanding to sixteen hours after that. The channel started broadcasting in November 2002 and was designated channel 9 on cable and satellite companies. In November 2003, Israel Plus filed a petition at the High Court of Justice against the CSBC for not properly inspecting its commercial activities. In a counter-petition presented by the Supreme Court, both ORT and RTVi were deemed foreign channels in Israel, and that RTVi solicited the Council to withdraw restrictions to Israeli advertisements on the channel, which represented 25% of its ad revenue.

Established in November 2002, the channel's first CEO was Yulia Shamalov-Berkovich, who led the company until February 2004. The station began broadcasting on 12 November 2002.

=== Acquisition ===
In May 2013, Israeli-Russian businessman Alexander Levin purchased control of the channel for NIS 6 million.

=== Staff and prominent journalists (2026) ===
- Yuri Kaganovich, CEO,
- Diana Tosunyan, the head of the International News department,
- Roman Yanushevsky, 9 TV news site Editor-in-Chief,
- Sergei Grankin, military journalist,
- Aliya Sudakova, TV anchor,
- Liora Schwartz, TV anchor,
- Boris Belodubrovsky, TV anchor,
- Igor Lerner, TV anchor and news editor,
- Boris Shtern, TV anchor,
- Karina Rubinstein, TV anchor,
- Ilya Bezruchko, TV anchor.

==== Former staff and prominent journalists ====
- Ksenia Svetlova, former Middle East issues correspondent and the Knesset member,
- Dmitry Dubov, former Editor-in-Chief,
- Yosef Shagal, former TV host and the Knesset member,
- Yelena Lagutina, former TV host,
- Yan Levinzon, former TV host and standup artist,
- Ilya Akselrod, former TV host and standup artist.

== See also ==
- Russian language in Israel
