= Oshrat Kotler =

Israeli TV moderator and journalist

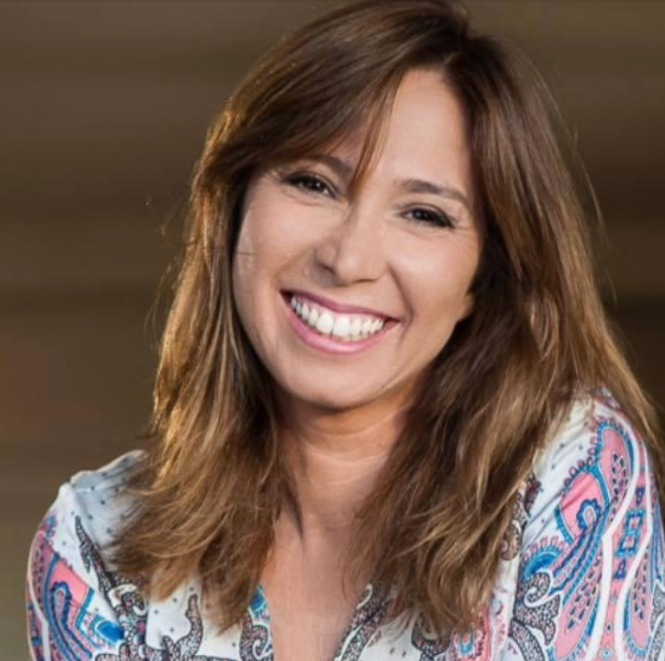

Oshrat Kotler (Hebrew: אושרת קוטלר; born 25 July 1965) is an Israeli journalist, television news presenter and author.

== Biography ==
Kotler, born Levi, comes from a Sephardi family from Bulgaria which spoke Ladino. She has written several books about her heritage. Kotler has a BA degree in Political sciences (cum laude) from Tel Aviv University.

== Media career ==
Kotler joined the Israeli News Company in 1994. She was a news anchor, editor, and correspondent. In 1995, during assassination of prime minister Rabin, she was the senior presenter of the main newscast of Channel 2 next to Jacob Eilon, and was amongst the presenters who covered the release of the Kempler video. Kotler worked for channel 2 news for 14 years editing and hosting various current affairs programs.

She was the first woman in Israel to host a personal political talk show (Meet the Press) and the first Israeli journalist to interview Hamas leader Ahmad Yasin in Gaza. Among her talk show guests were President Mubarak of Egypt, Prince Hassan of Jordan, the American Secretary of State Madeleine Albright, and all Israel's top political leaders.

In 2004 she left Channel 2 News to study philosophy at Tel Aviv University. In 2006 she published her first non-fiction novel ( "A way out" by Keter publishing house) The novel described life in Israel during the second Intifada and recommended Baruch Spinoza's philosophy as a practical tool to overcome life tragedies.

On 2007 she moved to Arutz Eser and created a number of documentaries dealing with the Israeli arms industry, political corruption, education and environment.

In 2007 she became the presenter and editor in charge of "The Magazine" Channel 10's main newscast on Saturday evening and led it successfully until she left Channel 10 (by then it had changed its name to Channel 13) in June 2019.

In November 2017, she recounted during a live broadcast a story from 1994 in which she was in a meeting with Keshet CEO member Alex Gilady and Giladi invited her to have dinner and spend the rest of the evening together, even though she was married at the time. The recounting of the story on live TV has been credited with sparking the #MeToo movement in Israel.

The last edition of "The Magazine" hosted by her was broadcast on June 22 2019.

== Awards and recognition ==
She won the title of “The honorable Israeli journalist” by Ami movement in 1994.

== Published works ==
- Sipur sheMatkhil beDmaot ((in Hebrew): "A Way Out," lit., A story that begins in tears) Keter, Kinneret, Zmora-Bitan, Dvir Publishing House, Ltd. (2010; first edition 2005) Nonfiction describing the second Palestinian Intifada, life in Israel, and personal experiences
- Ija Mia (2009) Fiction bestseller, one Israeli immigrant family in the early 20th century
- Love, passion, marriage, The Dialectic of love” (2014) non-fiction published by Kinneret Zmora-Bitan publishing house,

== See also ==
- Women of Israel
