= HaShidur HaMefutzal =

HaShidur HaMefutzal (Hebrew: השידור המפוצל; "The split broadcast") was a decision in 2002 by the Israeli broadcasting company Telad to broadcast reports from a suicide attack in Jerusalem side-by-side with an ongoing football match. This decision is considered an Israeli milestone on the collision between television ratings and national responsibility, as well as with the issue of dealing with terror.

== Broadcast ==
On 2 March 2002, a football match was played between Maccabi Haifa (then at the top of the Israeli Premier League) and Maccabi Kiryat Gat (then at the bottom of the same league). The Telad broadcasting company aired the game live on Israel's Channel 2. Thirty minutes into the game, Kiriat Gat was leading with a score of 3-0, in what seemed as one of the extraordinary matches for years.

Concurrently, first reports of a suicide attack in Jerusalem were beginning to arrive at the channel's news desk. Executives at Telad were faced with a dilemma about which of these events should be broadcast. Given the propensity of suicide attacks during this period (following the Second Intifada), the situation was fairly common, and normally handled by "handing off" broadcast to the Channel 2 News company. However, on this occasion Telad ultimately decided to split the screen - broadcasting the game on the rightmost third of the screen, while airing the breaking news and footage from the scene on the remaining space. The news break featured pictures of the devastated scene of the attack. The sound was shifted entirely to the news reports coming from Jerusalem. This continued for ten minutes, until the decision was made to end the broadcast of the game entirely, at which point the news report was scaled back to full-screen size.

== Reaction ==
In response, the Second Israeli Broadcasting Authority decided to "condemn poignantly this unacceptable behavior of Telad and its director, Uzi Peled, in the critical moments of the bloody suicide attack in Jerusalem". Moreover, it decided to take extreme punitive measures, and added that this decision followed previous events in which Telad refused to interrupt broadcasting football in order to report about terrorist acts. In actuality, the promised punitive measures were never applied.

Uzi Peled replied: "Telad handed the broadcast to the News Company when the first report [of the attack] was received, and around 20:00, when the size of the disaster was not yet known, we decided to broadcast using a split screen for about 10 minutes, without commercials and without voice from the football match. We did not have any economical concerns, we lost over one million shekels. After ten minutes, as we understood there were fatalities in the attack, we stopped the broadcast of the football match entirely. Retroactively, had we known the magnitude of the event, we sure wouldn't have chosen to split the screen."

This decision is considered as one on the lowest points in Arutz 2's image, and Telad's in particular. It was followed by harsh criticism both by journalists and by the general public. Some attribute Telad's loss of its franchising rights, three years later, to this event.
