= Liran Dan =

Israeli government official and media executive

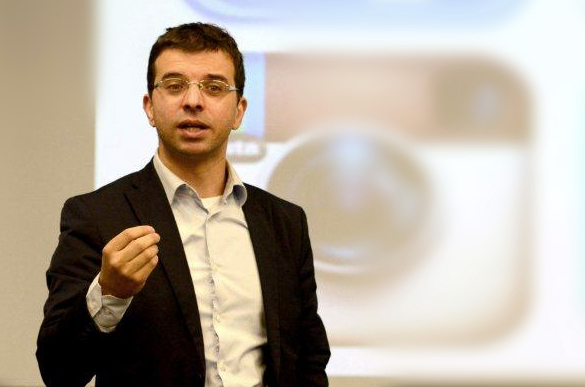
Liran Dan

Liran Dan is an Israeli government official and media executive. He was the Director of Communications at the Prime Minister's Office and Chief Media Adviser to Prime Minister Benjamin Netanyahu of Israel. He announced his resignation in March 2015 and served in the role until August 2015.

== Career ==
As the head of Public Diplomacy and Media for the 32nd and 33rd governments, Liran Dan was responsible for public diplomacy, media and Chief spokesperson during Operation Pillar of Defense and Operation Protective Edge, four UN General Assembly sessions (2011-2014), Prime Minister Netanyahu's speech to the US Congress in March 2015, Pope Francis' visit to Israel in May 2014 and US President Barack Obama's visit to Israel in March 2013.

Liran Dan joined the Prime Minister's Bureau in 2011 as Director of Public Diplomacy and media. In February 2012, he was appointed Director of Communications & Chief Media Adviser to Prime Minister Benjamin Netanyahu.

Previous to serving in that position, Dan served as VP Digital Media for Channel 2 news. This position included establishing a new digital desk and signing commercial contracts with international corporations. Dan previously served as the editor of the Channel 2 nightly news edition - the highest-rated news program in Israel.

== Background ==
Dan has an Executive MBA degree from Tel-Aviv University, and a BA in Political Science & History from Bar-Ilan University.

== Awards ==
- 2013 - The 'Roaring Lion' award, presented by the Media Advisors Organization, for the media campaign of President Obama's visit to Israel.
- 2009 - 'Marketing Man of the Month', awarded by the Israeli Marketing Organization for the penetration of Channel 2 news into the digital arena.
- 1998 - Outstanding Soldier Award, presented by the president of Israel at the jubilee of Israel's independence, representing the IDF Spokesperson's Unit.
