= Alex Gilady =

Israeli journalist and sports official (1942–2022)

- אלכס גילדי
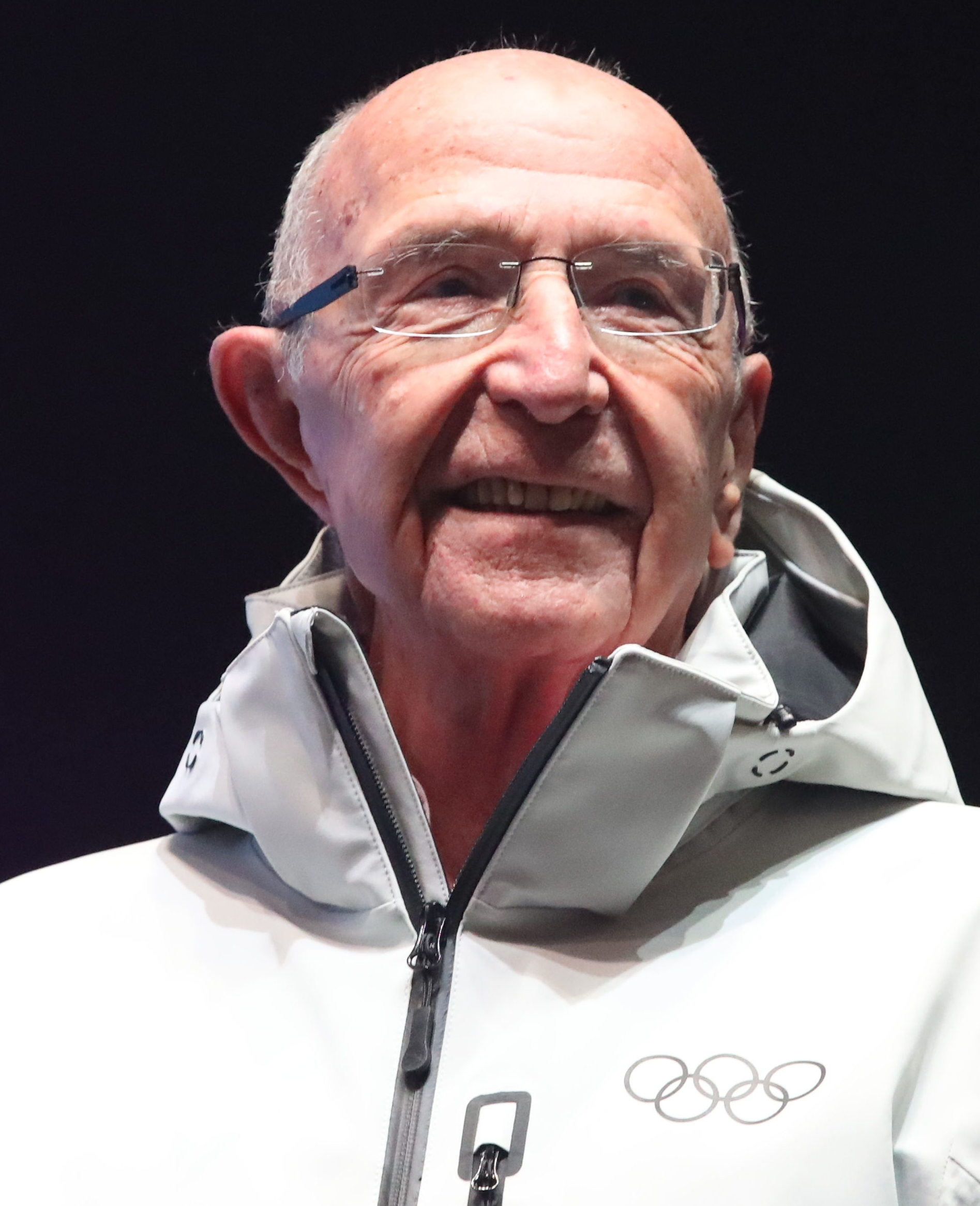
- Alex Gilady during the 2020 Winter Youth Olympics
- Born: 9 December 1942; Tehran, Iran
- Died: 13 April 2022 (aged 79); London, England
- Occupations: Journalist, sports official
- Organization: International Olympic Committee (1994–2022)

Alex Gilady (Hebrew: אלכס גילדי; 9 December 1942 – 13 April 2022) was an Israeli journalist and sports official.

== Personal life ==
Gilady was born on 9 December 1942 in Teheran, Iran. Gilady was the son of a Polish Jewish family who had fled during the Second World War, arriving in Israel, with his parents, and grew up in Ramat HaSharon.

Gilday studied at the Naval College, Mevo'ot Yam, Michmoret (Israel).

Gilady died on 13 April 2022 in London, England from lung cancer, aged 79.

== Career ==
From 1964, Gilady worked as a journalist.

== Sports career ==
Gilady became a sports commentator for television in 1968. From 1981 to 1996, he was vice president of the channel NBC Sports, and from 1985 to 2008 he was the Chairman of the Television Commission of the IAAF. Gilady was involved in the foundation of the Israeli media company Keshet from 1993 to 1999. In 1994, Gilady became a member of the International Olympic Committee (IOC). He was a member of the Commission for Public Relations and Social Development through Sport and the Commission for Communication. In 1996, he was Senior Vice-president of NBC Sports. From 2004 to 2019, he was Chairman of the International Basketball Federation (FIBA) TV Council. In 2005 he was President of media company Keshet. In 2007, he was awarded an honorary doctorate in philosophy by the University of Haifa. In 2020, Gilady was vice-chairman for the Coordination Commission for the 2020 Summer Olympic Games in Tokyo.

== Controversies ==
In 2017, Gilady temporarily resigned from his office as president of the Keshet Group after a rape accusation was made against him. The crimes were said to have been committed sometime between the 1970s and 1990s and were denied by Gilady. In January 2018, Gilady submitted a lawsuit to a Tel Aviv court against Oshrat Kotler, a broadcaster at Channel 10 Israel, and also against Neri Livneh, a journalist at the Haaretz newspaper. In 2019, he reportedly withdrew the lawsuit against the two women who publicly accused him of sexual harassment. Gilady was a supporter of the IOC's decision to postpone the Tokyo Summer Games in 2020 due to the coronavirus pandemic.

== Honours ==
- Seven Academy Awards (Emmy) for Olympic Games in Barcelona (1992), Atlanta (1996), Sydney (2000), Salt Lake City (2002), Athens (2004), Beijing (2008), London (2012)
- 1970 – Award for the best journalistic story with the subject 'The Sea'
- 1977 - Highest Israeli Broadcasting Association (IBA) award for producing President Sadat's first visit to Jerusalem
- 1977 - 'Man of the year' award for becoming the first Israeli broadcasting from Egypt
- 1979 - all electronic Media award for producing the Eurovision song contest in Israel
