= Gaelen Gilliland =

American musical theatre actress

- Born: Milwaukee, Wisconsin, U.S.
- Occupation: Musical theatre actress
- Known for: Wicked; Legally Blonde; 9 to 5: The Musical; Honeymoon in Vegas; Kinky Boots; SpongeBob SquarePants: The Broadway Musical
- Website: www.gaelengilliland.com

Gaelen Gilliland (born in Milwaukee, Wisconsin) is an American musical theatre actress. She has appeared on Broadway in Wicked, Legally Blonde, 9 to 5: The Musical (original Broadway cast), Honeymoon in Vegas (original Broadway cast), and Kinky Boots. Her most recent Broadway production was as Mayor of Bikini Bottom in SpongeBob The Musical. She worked on the pre-production and out of town performance of Finding Neverland. She also has appeared in the 1st National tour of Seussical: The Musical as Mayzie with Cathy Rigby as well as The Addams Family 1st National tour as Alice Beineke. She starred in the American tour of Mean Girls. Gaelen has performed in many regional theater productions most recently as Diana Goodman in Next To Normal at the Homdel Theatre Company, Holmdel, NJ.

== Credits ==
=== Broadway ===
- Wicked (Broadway Cast) [Ensemble, u/s Madame Morrible] *Replacement*
- Legally Blonde (Original Broadway Cast) [Mom, Courtney, Whitney, Ensemble u/s Paulette, Vivienne, Enid)
- 9 to 5: The Musical (Original Broadway Cast) [Swing, u/s Doralee, Judy]
- Honeymoon in Vegas (Original Broadway Cast) Ensemble
- Kinky Boots (Replacement) [Swing, u/s Pat, Trish, Milan Stage Manager]
- SpongeBob SquarePants: The Broadway Musical (Original Broadway Cast) [Mayor of Bikini Bottom]

=== National tours ===
- The Addams Family (Replacement) [Alice Beineke]
- Seussical (Original Cast) [Mayzie LaBird]
- Mean Girls (Original Cast) [Mrs. Heron/Ms. Norbury/Mrs. George]

== Special skills ==
- Tap dance
- Inline skating
- Being proficient in French
- Aerobic certified
- Marathon runner
- Sketch comedy and characters
