= Ya'akov Eilon =

Israeli television presenter and journalist

- יעקב אילון
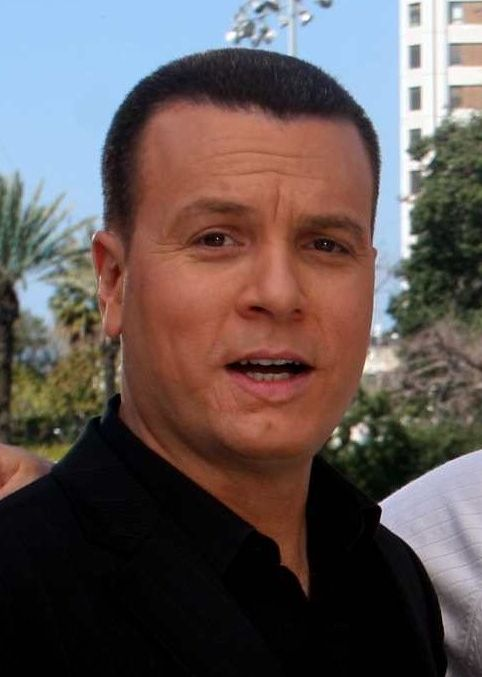
- Eilon in 2006
- Born: 3 May 1961 (age 65)
- Other name: Jacob Eilon
- Education: Tel Aviv University
- Occupations: Journalist and anchorman

Ya'akov Eilon (Hebrew: יעקב אילון; born 3 May 1961), a.k.a. Jacob Eilon, is an Israeli television presenter and journalist. Alongside Miki Haimovich, he was the anchor of Channel 2's HaHadashot 2 and Channel 10's Hadashot 10 news bulletins. Since 2019, Eilon presents the 5 pm IST edition of HaHadashot 13 on Reshet 13.

== Biography ==
He was born in Bat Yam as Ya'akov Pijade to Bulgarian Jewish parents. At the age of 14, he started writing for a youth newspaper. After serving in Galei Tzahal and graduating from Tel Aviv University, he lived in New York and worked there as a US correspondent for Yedioth Ahronoth for several years.

== Media and journalism career ==
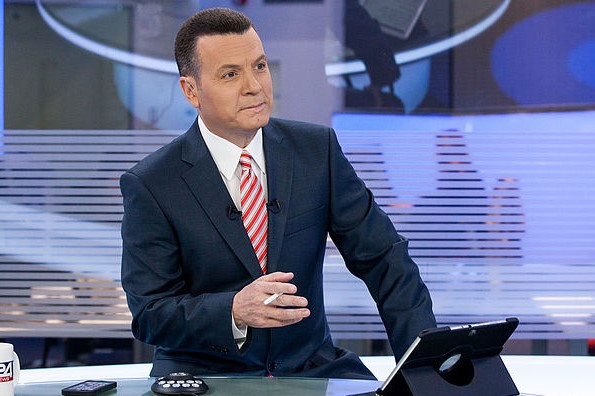
Eilon at i24 news studio

On 4 November 1993, Eilon anchored Channel 2's first news broadcast. In 1995, he was among the people who covered the release of the Kempler video in the aftermath of the assassination of Yitzhak Rabin. He frequently presented the news together with Miki Haimovich until he left Channel 2 in 2000 and moved to Channel 10 in 2002. He was reunited with Haimovich a year later, when she joined Channel 10.

In February 2012, Eilon sent his resignation to Channel 10 CEO Uri Rozen via email. Eilon and Haimovich weathered the economic storms that have frequently rocked Channel 10, but Eilon – among other highly paid staff members – did not get his January salary on time and was subsequently informed that the channel's management would be instituting a 15-percent pay cut among employees in the higher wage bracket. It is believed he quit because Channel 10 recently had to start broadcasting the main edition out of Jerusalem, whilst the rest of the producers, editors and reporters remained in the Tel Aviv studio. He claimed: "Even if the viewers do not fully understand that the studio picture is being projected behind me electronically, they notice, for example, that there are no more interviews in the new studio, and that we recently experienced a series of technical failures." He presented his last broadcast on Channel 10 on 29 April 2012.

Afterwards, he returned to Channel 2 as a news anchor for Keshet. During that period, he hosted an acclaimed documentary about anti-Semitism. He also anchored at Israel-based I24 News, presenting the weekly English-language program The World This Week. That program had disappointing viewer rates and was therefore taken off air.

In January 2015, he returned to TV as a host of the prime time news program Mabat on the IBA's Channel 1 and remained on this program for almost two years.

In 2017, he became an anchor and editor at Walla! News.

Since 16 January 2019, the day Reshet-Channel 10 merger took effect, Eilon is the main presenter of the 5 pm IST edition of HaHadashot 13 (renamed from Hadashot Eser on that day). He presented a one-time special bulletin broadcast at midnight 15–16 January 2019, which was preceded by a pre-merger special.

Starting October 2021, Eilon is one of the hosts of Middle East Now, a current-affairs program on i24NEWS, focusing on the day's headlines from the region. The program is hosted alternately by Eilon and Laura Cellier, Sunday to Thursday at 21:00 Israel time, 14:00 EST.

== See also ==
- HaHadashot 13 (formerly Hadashot 10)
- HaHadashot 12 (formerly HaHadashot 2)
