= Channel 12 (Israel) =

Israeli television channel

Keshet 12
- Country: Israel
- Broadcast area: National; Area C
- Affiliates: Keshet Media Group; Israeli News Company
- Headquarters: Ramat HaHayal, Tel Aviv

Programming
- Language: Hebrew
- Picture format: 1080i HDTV

Ownership
- Owner: Keshet Media Group

History
- Launched: 1 November 2017
- Replaced: Channel 2

Links
- Website: Keshet 12

Availability

Terrestrial
- Digital terrestrial television: Channel 12

Streaming media
- Keshet Media Group: mako.co.il

Keshet 12 (Hebrew: קשת 12) is an Israeli free-to-air television channel owned by Keshet Media Group. It launched on 1 November 2017 as one of two replacements for Channel 2, which was closed on that date.

== History ==
Israel's Channel 2 was operated by the Second Authority for Television and Radio, but was programmed by two rotating companies, Keshet Media Group and Reshet. As part of a larger series of reforms to Israel's broadcast system to increase diversity and competition, Channel 2 was shut down, and both concessionaires were granted their own, standalone channels; Keshet 12 officially launched on 1 November 2017, alongside Reshet 13. Programs were divided among the two channels. The Israel Television News Company continued to provide news programmes for both channels, with the main primetime bulletin simulcast by both channels, until 16 January 2019 when HaHadashot 12 was established after the merger of Reshet 13 and Channel 10.

Overnight between 27 and 28 July 2026, masked individuals smashed the entrance to Keshet 12's offices in Tel Aviv. A handwritten note left at the scene contained a death threat over the channel's coverage of the alleged abuse of a Palestinian detainee at the Sde Teiman detention camp. Earlier in July, two bricks had been thrown through the building's glass entrance.

== See also ==
- List of programs broadcast by Channel 2 (Israel)
- List of television channels in Israel
- HaHadashot 12
