= Miki Haimovich =

Israeli television presenter and politician

- מִיקִי חַיְימוֹבִיץ׳
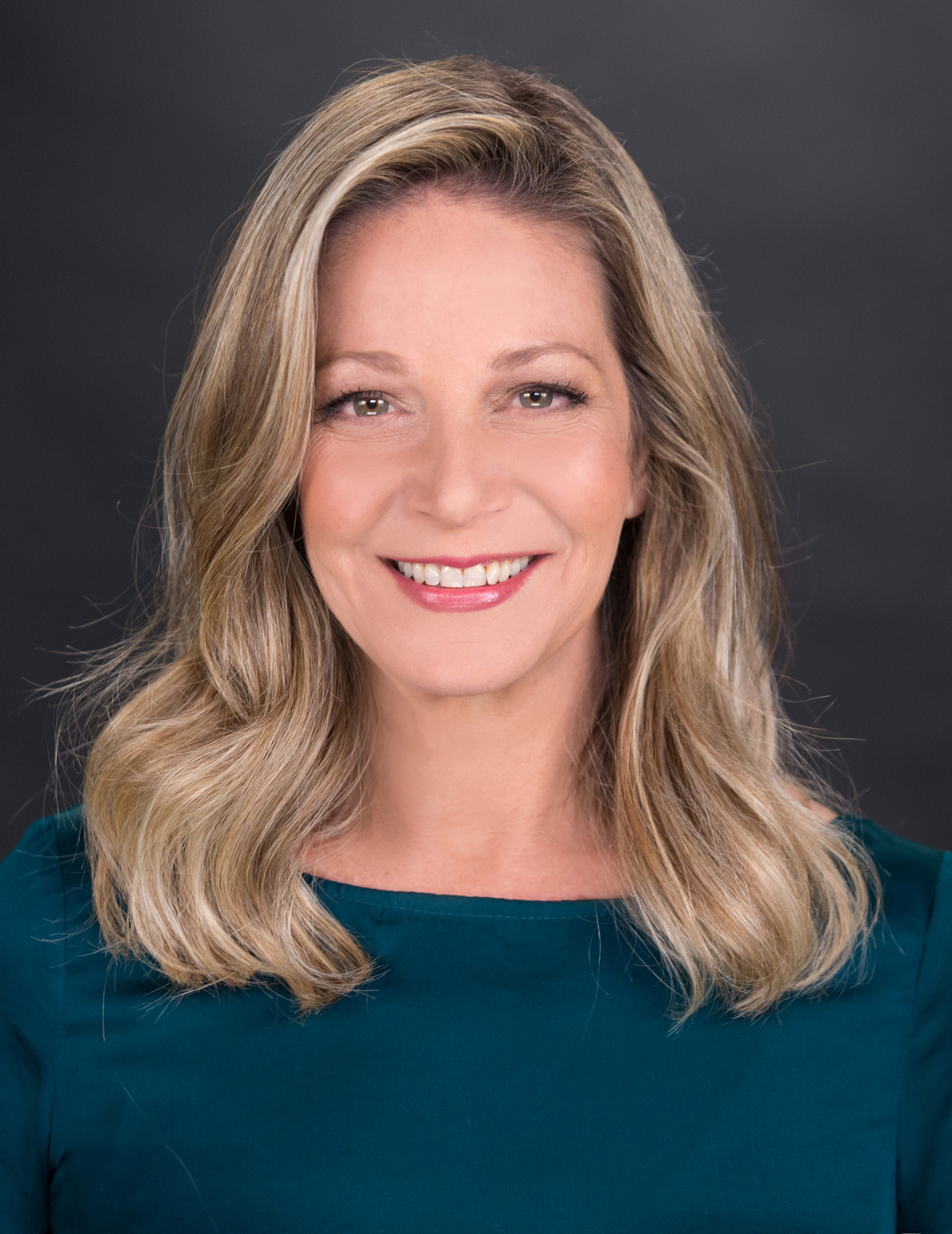
- Haimovich

Faction represented in the Knesset
- 2019–2021: Blue and White

Personal details
- Born: 15 June 1962 (age 63) Tel Aviv, Israel

Miki Haimovich (Hebrew: מִיקִי חַיְימוֹבִיץ׳ pronounced [ˈmiki χajˈmovitʃ]; born 15 June 1962) is an Israeli television presenter, former politician and veganism activist. She served as a member of the Knesset for Blue and White from 2019 to 2021.

== Biography ==
Haimovich attended Tichon Hadash high school in Tel Aviv. Michal (Miki) Haimovich earned a BA in political science from Tel Aviv University. Haimovich is vegan and in 2012 she launched the Meatless Monday Israel initiative.

== Media career ==
Haimovich worked as a researcher for Channel 1 programmes Mabat Sheni and Boker Tov Israel. In 1990, she began editing the news for the Matav cable channel, later becoming chief editor.

In 1993, she and Ya'akov Eilon became the first news anchors on the new commercial Channel 2, until moving to Channel 10 together, in 2002.

In June 2011, Haimovich resigned from Channel 10 news.

== Political career ==
In 2012, Haimovich joined a non-partisan campaign enlisting leading artists, television presenters and journalists to encourage voter participation in the 2013 Knesset elections.

She was elected to the Knesset in the April 2019 Israeli legislative election as a member of the Israel Resilience Party, a part of the Blue and White alliance. Haimovich was re elected to the 22 & 23rd Knessets. She was not included in Blue & White's electoral list for the 2021 elections, following her vote against a budget extension, which effectively caused the dissolution of the government.

== See also ==
- Channel 10 (Israel)
- Hadashot 10
- Women in Israel
