= Cable and Satellite Broadcasting Council =

Israeli broadcast regulatory body

The Cable and satellite broadcasting council (Hebrew: המועצה לשידורי כבלים ושידורי לוויין) is a governing-body whose purpose is to facilitate and regulate commercially operated television cable and satellite broadcasts in Israel. Its tasks include preserving broadcasts, overseeing children's programming, and consumer protection.

== History ==
In 2005, Israeli Minister of Communications Dalia Itzik decided to set up a Union of councils as a union between the cable and satellite broadcasting council and The Second Authority for Television and Radio. In April 2008, two months after the departure of Yigal Levy, who served as an acting chairman, a search committee of the Ministry of Communications chose Nitzan Chen as chairman of the council.

The Cable and Satellite broadcasting council is a public council which meets once a week. The council members attend it without pay, as a public service, and each of the members is connected to different businesses. The only person in the council whom receives a salary whose main job is being in this council is the chairman.

The Cable and Satellite broadcasting council consists of 13 representatives, excluding the Chairman:

- Six of the council members are representatives of various ministries: the Ministry of Communications, Ministry of Justice, Ministry of Education and the Ministry of Finance.
- Seven of the board members are public representatives: Representatives of public cultural and educational organizations and representatives of the government.

== See also ==
Television in Israel
