= Channel 13 (Israel) =

Israeli television channel

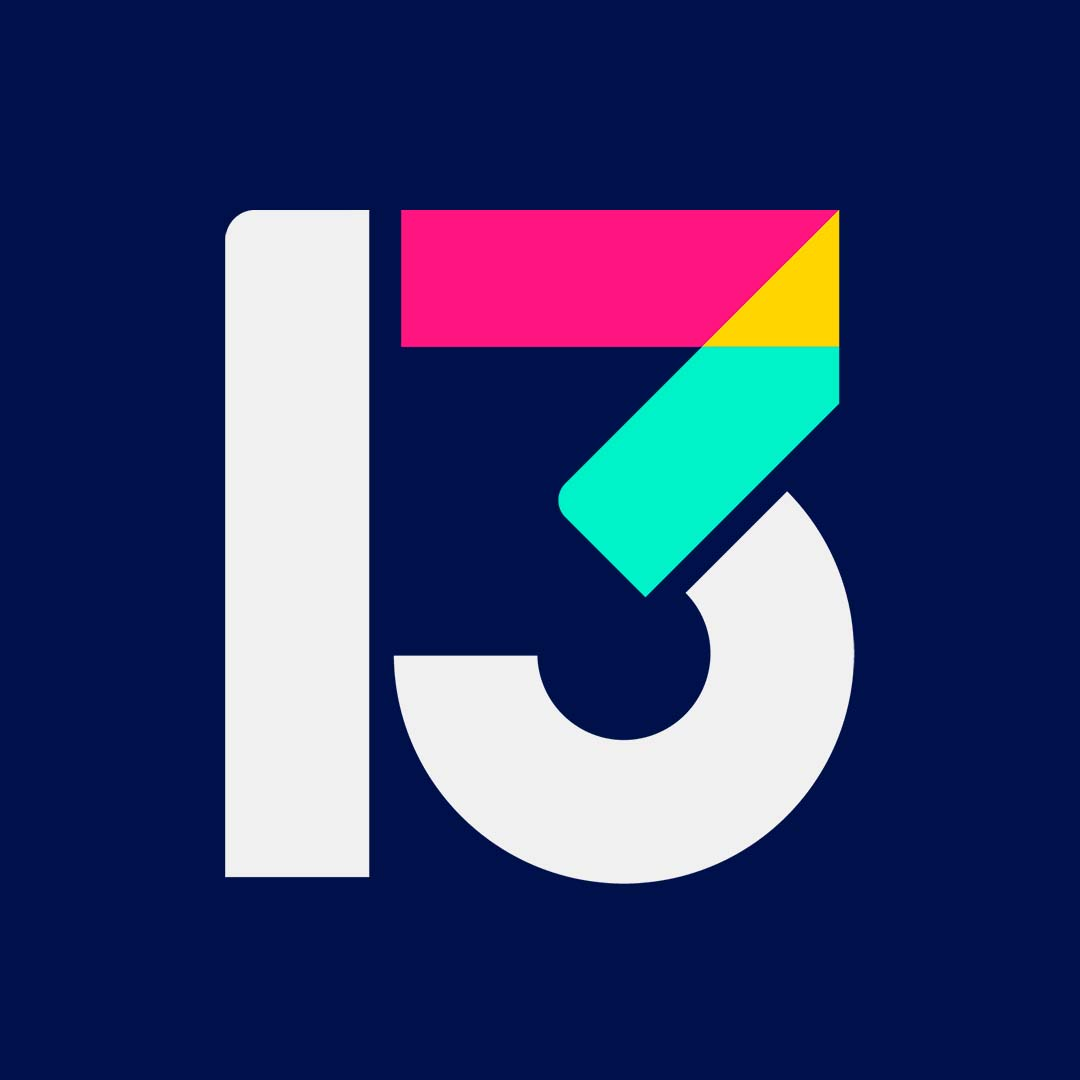
- Logo used since January 1, 2022
- Country: Israel
- Broadcast area: Israel; Worldwide (via Internet)
- Affiliates: Reshet; HaHadashot 13
- Headquarters: Ramat HaHayal, Tel Aviv

Programming
- Language: Hebrew
- Picture format: 1080i HDTV downscaled to letterboxed 576i for the SDTV feed)

Ownership
- Owner: Reshet

History
- Launched: 1 November 2017; 9 years ago
- Replaced: Channel 2 Channel 10

Links
- Website: 13tv.co.il

Availability

Terrestrial
- Digital terrestrial television: Channel 13

Streaming media
- 13tv.co.il/live

Channel 13 (Hebrew: ערוץ 13) is an Israeli free-to-air television channel operated by Reshet Media. It was launched on 1 November 2017 as one of two replacements of the outgoing Channel 2.

== History ==
Israel's Channel 2 was operated by the Second Authority for Television and Radio, but was programmed by two rotating companies, Keshet Media Group and Reshet. As part of a larger series of reforms to Israel's broadcast system to increase diversity and competition, Channel 2 was shut down, and both broadcasters were granted their own, separate channels. Reshet 13 and Keshet 12 both officially launched on 1 November 2017 as standalone channels. The Israel Television News Company continued to provide news programmes for both channels; the main primetime bulletin is simulcast by both channels, while other programs are divided among the two channels.

In June 2018, due to financial issues caused by the 2017 Channel 2 split, RGE (owner of Channel 10) filed a merger with this channel's parent company Reshet. In October 2018, Reshet announced that the merger had been cancelled. Reshet's owners have since reconsidered the merger, and after a long battle with the Second Authority, the merger was approved, and was scheduled for January 16, 2019. The merger saw certain programmes previously shown on Channel 10 moved to Reshet 13, which subsequently changed its name to Channel 13, with the new slogan "everything connects".

== Ownership and management ==
When the channel began broadcasting, on 1 November 2017, it was controlled by the owners of Reshet Media - Ofer Family (51%), Strauss Investments (16%) and Endemol (33%), and the Channel’s CEO was Avi Zvi.

Following the Reshet-Channel 10 merger, the shareholding composition for the channel changed as of 16 January 2019, as follows: Sir Len Blavatnik held approximately 52%, Udi Recanati (through Naftali Investments) held approximately 9% and Nadav Topolsky held approximately 7% of the shares. Jointly the three held 68% as RGE. Of the Reshet shareholders, Udi Angel held approximately 16%, Endemol held approximately 11% and Michael Strauss held approximately 5%.

In June 2020, negotiations began with other parties in an attempt to form a partnership which would absorb Blavatnik’s share of the company.

In early 2021, discussions began with Discovery Group and an agreement was reached and approved in July 2021. The channel’s new shareholding structure is: ~52% Sir Len Blavatnik’s Access, 21% Discovery, 13.5% Nadav Topolsky, 8% Udi Angel and 5.5% Strauss Family. In practice, Discovery replaced Endemol and Recanati, which held shares in the Channel.

The current CEO is Yoram Altman Eldar and the CEO of the News Company is Aviram Elad.

== Programming ==
=== News ===
Being one of two direct replacements of Channel 2, Reshet 13 has broadcast news programmes produced by Israel Television News Company (which produced HaHadashot 2 for Channel 2), a company Reshet jointly owned with Keshet.

Following the merger between Reshet and Channel 10, Reshet sold its stake in the News Company to Keshet. Reshet 13 took resources and programmes from Channel 10's news production company, which then changed on-air branding to HaHadashot 13.

== See also ==
- List of programs broadcast by Channel 2 (Israel)
- List of television channels in Israel
- Channel 13 News
