= Second Authority for Television and Radio =

Israeli television and radio authority

- Hebrew: הרשות השנייה לטלוויזיה ולרדיו

Agency overview
- Formed: 1 September 1991; 35 years ago
- Headquarters: 20 Beit Hadfus str. Jerusalem
- Agency executives: Mordechai Mordechai, Chairman; Michelle Kremerman, General director
- Parent agency: Ministry of Communications
- Website: www.rashut2.org.il

The Second Authority for Television and Radio (Hebrew: הרשות השניה לטלויזיה ורדיו, HaRashut HaShniya Le'Televizya VeRadio) is an Israeli government regulator for commercial TV and radio, established by the Knesset in 1990.

Besides conducting tenders and selecting operators, the authority regulates and supervises commercial broadcasts, ensuring that a certain percentage of the broadcast content is produced locally.

== History ==
The Second Authority for Television and Radio is led by a fifteen-member council entrusted with maintaining the public interest in commercial radio and television broadcasts delivered by licensed stations owned and operated by entities in the private sector. Until the establishment of the Second Authority most radio and television media in Israel were public broadcasting services delivered under the auspices of the Israel Broadcasting Authority (the IBA). This included the country's then-single television channel and several radio stations. Since their inception, the Second Authority's television and radio broadcasts have been operating alongside, and essentially in competition with, the broadcasts of the IBA.

The authority handles citizen complaints, ensures that commercial advertisements are run within the allotted time and ensures that the operators maintain a certain mix of program genres as stipulated in their licenses. About 2% of the broadcast time on the commercial channels is reserved for various public-interest programs, which are produced by the authority itself.

The authority is also in charge of establishing and maintaining the nationwide DTT (DVB-T) infrastructure in Israel, which was branded as "Idan+". The digital network is utilized by both the Second Authority as well as the Israeli Public Broadcasting Corporation (replacing the Israel Broadcasting Authority). In March 2011 analog television broadcasts in Israel ceased and since then terrestrial television is only broadcast digitally over the Idan+ network.

The Second Authority issues licenses for commercial television and regional radio stations by putting those services up for tender and selecting operators from the tender responders. The Authority established the first commercial television station in Israel, Channel 2, in November 1993 after several years of test broadcasts. Three franchisees were selected to operate the channel in the initial tender, Keshet, Reshet, and Telad, each of which were reserved certain broadcast days during the week and collected ad revenues for those days. Also, a fourth company was established, the Israeli News Company which was responsible for producing the daily news broadcasts shown on Channel 2. The channel has become successful and has provided a good return on investment to the three operators.

In 1995, the authority divided the country into regions and put up for tender licenses for 14 commercial regional radio stations. These are generally geographical in nature, although in practice there is considerable overlap between the various regions (and with certain radio programs being broadcast simultaneously across multiple regional stations through syndication agreements).

In 2002 the authority established an additional commercial television station, Channel 10. In 2004 the network's operators and license provisions were reorganized to revitalize the station. In 2005, the original tender for Channel 2 expired and the network was re-bid, and since then was run by two operators instead of three.

On 1 November 2017, Channel 2 shut down, and each operator started its own broadcast channel with Keshet being assigned to channel 12 and Reshet being assigned to channel 13. Channel 10 also moved to channel 14 before merging into channel 13 in 2019. With the merger Channel 10 news company became the news company of Chaanel 13. The Israeli News Company kept producing newscasts for channel 13 until 2019, and since continues to produce newscasts for channel 12.

== See also ==
- Television in Israel
