= Reshet =

Israeli television broadcasting and production company

- Logo used since 2022
- Native name: רשת
- Type: Broadcasting company
- Headquarters: Tel Aviv, Israel
- Area served: Nationwide
- Key people: Yoram Altman Eldar (CEO)
- Owners: Merit Spread Foundation (75%); Access Industries (12.5%); Skydance Corporation (12.5%)
- Website: 13tv.co.il

Reshet (Hebrew: רשת, lit. "Network") is an Israeli television broadcasting and production company. It was one of the two concessionaires running the Israeli commercial television channel, Channel 2 from 1993 to 2017, and is running channel 13 alongside RGE media group at present.

== History ==
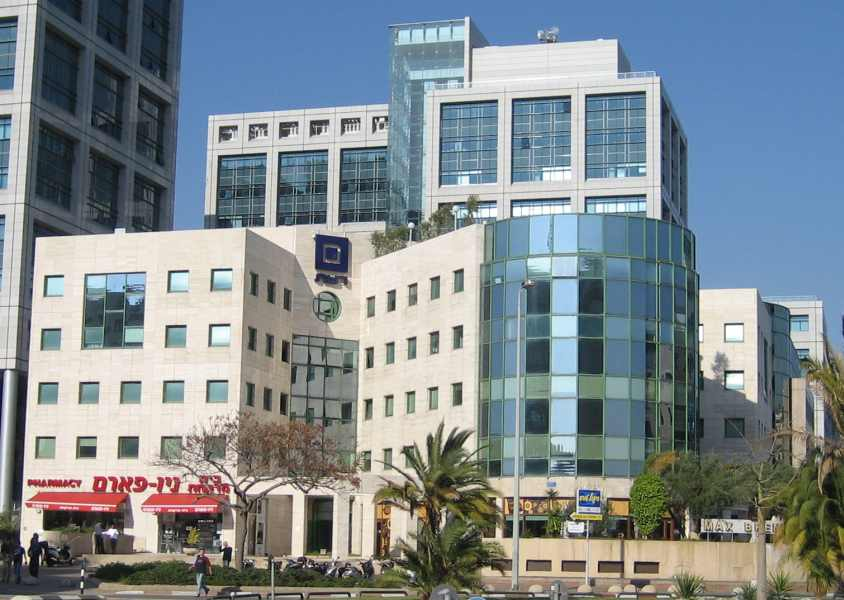
Reshet studio building in Tel Aviv

On 4 November 1993, it began broadcasting on the commercial Channel 2 under the Second Israeli Broadcasting Authority. At that time three concessionaires were chosen: Keshet, Telad and Reshet. The three concessionaires received a broadcasting contract for one decade. They decided they would exchange among themselves the broadcasting days in a week so that one broadcast three days a week while the other two broadcast two days.

In April 2005, a decision was made by a committee of the communication ministry that by the end of the decade only two concessionaires would receive broadcasting contracts for the following decade. Of the four competitors (the fourth was Kan, unrelated to the Israeli Public Broadcasting Corporation, which would only be established 12 years afterwards), Keshet and Reshet were chosen. Each of the companies broadcast 3 or 4 days a week and changed every 2 years.

In 2017 it was announced than on November 1, Channel 2 would be shut down and Keshet and Reshet - two of the companies who broadcast on the channel - were to be separated into 2 TV channels. Reshet announced and launched a rebranding campaign for its new channel, Reshet 13.

In June 2018, due to financial issues caused by the 2017 Channel 2 split, RGE's Channel 10 filed a plan for a merger with Reshet's Channel 13. As a part of the merger plan, Channel 10 News (RGE's news company) was to become a part of Channel 13, and some programs from Channel 10 would join Reshet 13. Channel 10 itself would stop broadcasting, and more than 100 employees would be eliminated if the merger goes through. In October 2018, Reshet announced that the merger was cancelled. Reshet's owners have since reconsidered the merger, and after a long battle with the Second Authority, the merger was approved, and was completed on 16 January 2019.
