= Nadav Eyal =

Israeli journalist

Nadav Eyal נדב איל
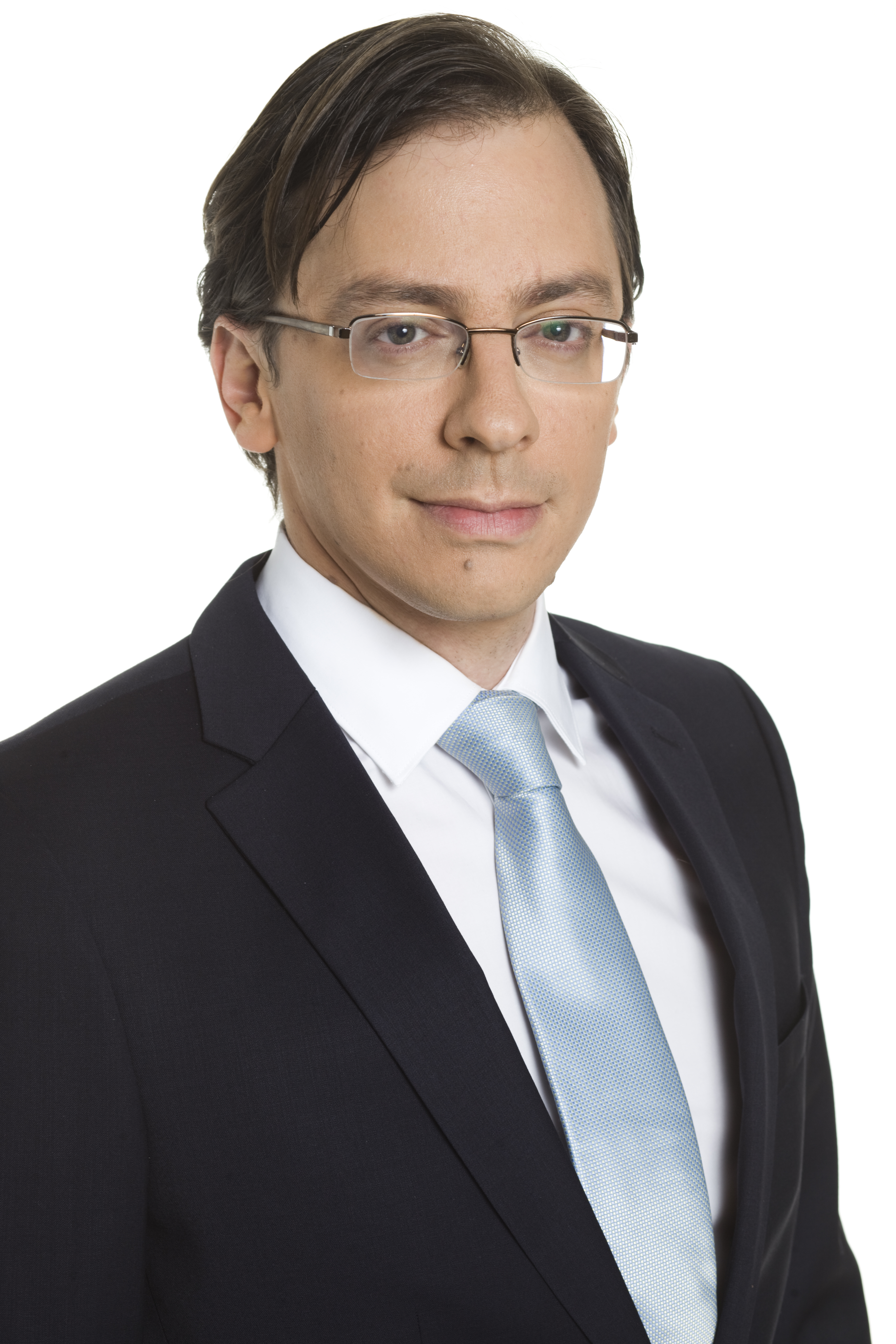
- Born: Nadav Asher Eyal; 6 March 1978 (age 48); England, United Kingdom
- Education: Hebrew University of Jerusalem; London School of Economics
- Occupation: Journalism
- Spouse: Tamar Ish-Shalom
- Children: 3

Nadav Asher Eyal (Hebrew: נדב אשר איל; born March 6, 1978) is an Israeli journalist and commentator, who served as a foreign news editor for Channel 13. He is the author of the book Revolt: The Worldwide Uprising Against Globalization (2021).

== Early life ==
Eyal was born in 1979 in England and grew up in Pardes Hanna, Israel. His father Rafi participated as an IDF paratrooper officer in the Operation Spring of Youth and received the Medal of Distinguished Service for his heroism. During his youth, Eyal served as a guide in the Scout group. He graduated from the Faculty of Law of the Hebrew University of Jerusalem.

== Journalism career ==
In 1997, he enlisted in the Army Radio and served as reporter in the West Bank. He later served as reporter and editor for Army Radio.

Eyal joined Channel 10 when it was founded in 2002, and served as a political and political correspondent. Following his appointment, Israeli newspaper Haaretz noted that Eyal was the youngest political correspondent in the Israeli television.

In 2003, he joined Maariv and served as a political correspondent. In 2005, he was appointed as political commentator. Eyal covered the Israeli elections in 1999, 2001, 2003 and 2006. At the same time, he worked with the Army Radio.

In 2007, Eyal moved to London to study after receiving a scholarship from the British Foreign Office. He earned a master's degree from the London School of Economics in global politics.

From 2008, he served as the European correspondent and special missions reporter for Maariv. While in these positions, he covered the 2008 Mumbai attacks, 2008 US presidential election and the trial of John Demjanjuk. In addition, he served as a regular publicist in the newspaper's opinion section. In March 2010, he was appointed Channel 10's foreign news editor.

In February 2011, about six months before the start of the Israeli social justice protests, he began publishing a series of large-scale articles in Maariv that dealt with the middle class, the political system in Israel and centralization in the Israeli economy. In January 2012, he was chosen by Globes newspaper as one of the 100 most influential people in the media of 2011, due to what was defined as his part in "fueling the social protests."

In October 2014, Channel 10 aired Eyal's documentary Hate: A Journey to the Dark Heart of Racism, which documented the recent rise of antisemitism in Europe.

From May 2014, Eyal wrote monthly commentary section for Liberal magazine. From August 2016, Eyal published opinion articles on Yedioth Ahronoth. That same year, he published a series of expansion articles that covered fault lines in American society and examined the possibility of victory for Donald Trump in the 2016 US presidential election.

In 2017, he won the Sokolov Prize "for outstanding achievements in the field of in-depth articles in the electronic media".

During the COVID-19 pandemic, Eyal examined the spread of COVID-19 from the beginning, and the scope and systematic nature of the information and research activities on the subject which he posted on Twitter, as part of his work with Channel 13. He also promoted a medical policy in which patients infected with COVID-19 would be separated from their families and the number of laboratory tests in COVID-19 would be increased, a model used similarly in South Korea.

From 2020, Eyal serves as the volunteer chairman of the "Movement for Freedom of Information".

In November 2020, he announced that he would leave his position as foreign news editor at Channel 13. He began serving as a commentator and senior columnist for Yedioth Ahronoth, while at the same time continuing to serve as a commentator on Channel 13. In February 2023, he chose to end his work as a commentator on Channel 13.

His book "How Democracy Will Win" was published in 2023. In the book, he covers the protest against 2023 Israeli judicial reform and reviews the attempts around the world to overthrow democracy, and what the democratic camp in Israel and around the world should do.

In April 2024, he began hosting the program "Einav and Nadav", alongside journalist Einav Galili, on Channel 12.

In June 2024, he announced that he was leaving Israel for a year with his family for a teaching position at Columbia University in New York. At the same time, he continued to write for Yedioth Ahronoth.

== Personal life ==
Eyal is married to Channel 13 news anchor Tamar Ish-Shalom. They have three children (two daughters and one son).

== Published works ==
- Eyal, Nadav (2021). Revolt: The Worldwide Uprising Against Globalization (Hardcover). Ecco. ISBN 9780062973351.
- Eyal, Nadav(2023). How Democracy Will Win, in Hebrew.
