= Ratzon =

Ratzon, sometimes Ratson (Hebrew: רצון) is a Hebrew surname.

- Elad Ratson
- Goel Ratzon
- Menachem Ratzon
- Michael Ratzon
- Zion Ratzon, Israeli general
