= Nesli Barda =

Israeli journalist

- נסלי ברדה
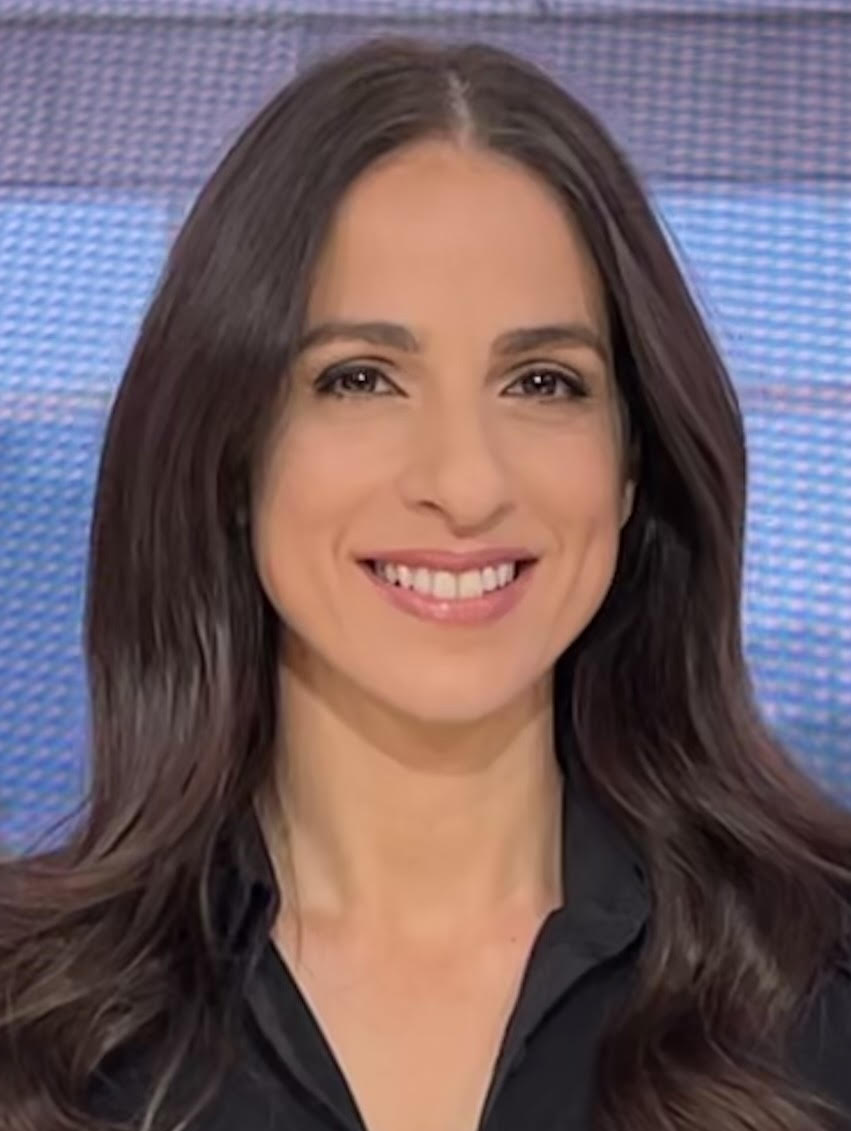
- Born: November 3, 1983 (age 41); Oranit, Israel
- Education: Thelma Yellin High School of the Arts
- Employer: Keshet Media Group
- Spouse: Irit Magal (2018–2023)
- Children: 1

Nesli Barda (Hebrew: נסלי ברדה; Born November 3, 1983) is an Israeli journalist, news anchor and radio personality. She hosts the late morning show alongside Yoav Limor on Keshet's Channel 12.

== Biography ==
Barda was born, raised, and educated in Oranit, and has three brothers. Her mother is a banker, and her father was a career soldier of the C4I Corps. She studied theater at the Thelma Yellin High School of the Arts in Givatayim. Before her military service, she spent a pre-army service year working in Jewish institutions in the United States. She completed her military service at Israeli Army Radio, where she served as a correspondent covering police and consumer affairs.

After her service, Barda joined Channel 10 as a health correspondent and later transitioned to covering criminal affairs. During the 2006 Lebanon War, she reported from the northern border. In 2007, she hosted Channel 10's morning show Kol Boker ("Every Morning"). Two years later, she began hosting the Thursday night current affairs program HaYom Sh'eHaya ("The Day That Was") and also edited segments for Channel 10's investigative show HaMakor ("The Source"). In 2011, she hosted HaShavua ("This Week"), a Friday night news program on Channel 10.

In August 2014 she left Channel 10 for Keshet's Channel 12, as a part of the team of the program Uvda ("Fact"). In November 2017 she started hosting Channel 12's Hadshot HaBoker ("The Morning News") on Thursdays.

In May 2018, Barda began hosting Echad L'eMillion ("One in a Million"), a program that highlights people who have found themselves in extraordinary situations.

During 2023, she began hosting the program Anashim ("People") on Channel 12.

During the Gaza war, Barda began hosting the late morning show, broadcast after Niv Raskin's Hadshot HaBoker ("The Morning News"), alongside Yoav Limor.

== Personal life ==
Barda was in a relationship with TV editor Irit Magal for a decade. The two married in June 2018. In September 2020, Barda gave birth to their daughter. In July 2023, Barda announced that they had separated. Five months later, it was reported that she was in a relationship with Sivan Fischler, Communications and Business Development Manager at the Olympic Committee of Israel. In September 2024, Barda and Fischler separated after nearly a year of being together.

In 2022, Barda's father was killed in a car accident, one day after his 65th birthday, when a vehicle driving against traffic collided with his car.

== Filmography ==
=== Films ===
Year	Title	Role	Notes	Source
2009	The Incredible Story of Goel Ratzon and His 32 Wives	Interviewer	Also director; Television film	

=== Television ===
Years	Title	Role	Notes
2002–2014	Channel 10 News	Feature reporter / News anchor / Health correspondent / Crime reporter	
2006–2009	Shishi	Broadcast news anchor / Feature journalist	
2007	Kol Boker	Host	
2009–2014	Hayom Shehaya	News anchor	
2014–2017	Uvda	Reporter	
2017–2019	Hay Balayla	Temporary news anchor	
2017–present	Hadshot HaBoker	Host	
2018–2023	One in a Million	Presenter	Also director and creator
2022–2023	Ahava Gdola MeHaHa’yim	Host	Also director and creator
2023	Anashim	Host	
2023–2024	Giborim	Presenter	Also director, creator and screenwriter
