= Nesli (name) =

Nesli is a rare given name with different origins. Notable people with the name include:

- Nesli (born 1980), Italian singer-songwriter, rapper and producer
- Nesli Barda (born 1983), Israeli journalist, news anchor and radio personality
- Nesli Çölgeçen (born 1955), Turkish film director and screenwriter

== See also ==
- Nesley Jean (born 1985), Bahamian soccer player
