= Paris Plage =

Paris Plage or Paris-Plage may refer to:

- Paris-Plages, a program of temporary beaches in Paris each summer, originally called "Paris-Plage"
- Le Touquet-Paris-Plage, beach resort on the north coast of France
