= Goel Ratzon =

Israeli polygamist (born 1950)

- גואל רצון
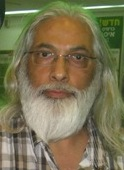
- Ratzon in 2009
- Born: 19 September 1950 (age 76); Hatikva Quarter, Tel Aviv, Israel
- Occupation: Spiritual healer
- Years active: 1991–2009
- Spouse: 21 wives
- Children: 49
- Status: In prison
- Convictions: Guilty in most of the sexual assaults and fraud under aggravated circumstances; Acquitted of the slavery charges
- Criminal charges: Rape, sodomy, indecent assault, groping, incest and other sexual assaults; Fraud under aggravated circumstances; Slavery
- Penalty: 30 years imprisonment
- Capture status: Arrested

Details
- Victims: 21 women
- Span of crimes: 1991–2009
- Country: Israel
- Location: Tel Aviv

Goel Ratzon (Hebrew: גואל רצון; born 19 September 1950) is an Israeli polygamist who led a cult in Hatikva Quarter in south Tel Aviv. As the cult leader, Ratzon had 21 wives, who bore him 49 children. In September 2014, Tel Aviv-Yafo District Court convicted Ratzon of rape, fraud and other offences against his wives and daughters. He was sentenced to 30 years' imprisonment.

== Early life ==
Ratzon was born in Hatikva Quarter to parents who immigrated to Israel (Aliyah) from Yemen. He had a number of odd jobs, such as a renovation worker and vehicle mechanic. In 1972, he married a woman with whom he had five children. At the beginning of the 1980s, he met another woman with whom he had five more children. Starting in 1991, he became famous as a spiritual healer and as a proficient in Kabbalah while gathering many women to a cult. Some of these women introduced their female friends and relatives to Ratzon's cult. In these years, he earned his living from funds transferred to him by his wives, either salaries of their work as housewives or their income support as single mothers from Israel's national social security agency, Bituah Leumi. Ge had romantic relationships with his women.

== Formation of the cult ==
The daily life of Ratzon's cult was exposed to the public on 11 February 2009, by Israeli journalists Shelley Tapiro and Nesli Barda of Israeli TV Channel 10. A day after broadcasting Tapiro and Barda's report, Ratzon was interviewed by Israeli TV Channel 2 and claimed that he had only assisted women who needed his help and nothing else. Nine of his sons and daughters were named after him, such as Goel ("Redeemer"), Yigal ("He will redeem"), Geula ("Redemption"), Yigaela (a feminine version of Yigal), Adoneinu HaGoel ("Our Lord the Redeemer") and Goeleliya ("God Redeemer"). The cult resided in several houses, in which Ratzon periodically visited. In each house, domestic duties were shared between the women.

Some of Ratzon's wives had said in public that they adored him. Many of them tattooed his name on their arms, as well as his face portrait. They had declared that without Ratzon, there was no meaning for their life. Ratzon said that if someone had given him the same treatment that he gave his wives then he would have trusted him with his life. Ratzon's neighbours claimed that he had hypnotized his wives.

In an article published by Israeli newspaper Maariv, it was mentioned that Ratzon's wives were obliged to obey a detailed set of rules which Ratzon had written in a secret document called "The Book of the Family".

== Arrest and conviction ==
Ratzon was taken under arrest on 12 January 2010 by Israeli police, being suspected for slavery and sexual assaults against minors. Galit, one of the wives who left him, whose two sisters also participated in his community, had filed a complaint against him for raping her when she was a minor at the age of 14. After receiving Galit's complaint, the police had been keeping Ratzon and his wives under surveillance using hidden cameras and eavesdropping. In one of the recorded conversations he noted he had sexual intercourse with one of his daughters. After Ratzon's arrest, his wives and children were evacuated from Ratzon's house to women's shelter, aided by the welfare services. In an interview after his arrest, he claimed that his relationships with his wives were based on love and respect.

On 8 September 2014, Tel Aviv-Yafo District Court convicted Ratzon of most of the sexual assaults with which he had been charged, but acquitted of the slavery charge. On 28 October 2014, he was sentenced for 30 years. Ratzon filed an appeal to the Supreme Court of Israel, which was denied on 18 July 2016.

Ratzon is considered an endangered prisoner, and for that he is moved between prisons occasionally. His wives and children broke off their relations with him, except for his son Yigal who supports him and declared that he would rebuild his father's harem.

== See also ==
- Haredi burqa sect
- Shomrat gang rape
