= Ilit Ferber =

Israeli philosopher

- Born: 23 May 1973 (age 52)
- Occupations: Associate Professor, Philosopher

Philosophical work
- School: Continental Philosophy
- Institutions: Tel Aviv University
- Main interests: Philosophy of emotions Philosophy of language Philosophy of history Jewish philosophy

Ilit Ferber (Hebrew: עילית פרבר; born 1973) is an associate professor of Philosophy at Tel Aviv University.

== Academic biography ==
During the years 1998–2002, Ferber was a student at the Adi Lautman Interdisciplinary Program for Outstanding Students at Tel Aviv University. Her Master Thesis, "Truth and the idea in Walter Benjamin's early writings", was written at the department of philosophy. Ferber continued to pursue a PhD in philosophy, which she wrote between the years 2003–2008 under the supervision of Eli Friedlander. Her dissertation was titled "Melancholy and philosophy: Walter Benjamin's early writings". During her Ph.D. studies, she spent two years in the German department at Princeton University as a visiting research collaborator and guest scholar, where she worked with Prof. Michael Jennings. Between 2007 and 2008, Ferber was a postdoctoral researcher at the Franz Rosenzweig Minerva Center at the Hebrew University of Jerusalem, and between 2008 and 2010, she was a recipient of the Yad-Hanadiv Rothschild postdoctoral scholarship (during which she was a visiting scholar in Berlin and Chicago). Since 2010, Prof. Ferber teaches philosophy at Tel Aviv University.

== Research and writing ==
Ferber's research focuses on philosophy of emotions, which she examines from a historical and linguistic perspective. In her work, she deals with emotions such as melancholy, suffering, and pain, examining their relation to language and expression. In her research, she explores emotions not from a therapeutic or psychological approach but rather, from a philosophical point of view.

Throughout the years, Ferber dealt with these issues through different perspectives, creating a dialogue with a variety of thinkers from different periods of the history of philosophy. Ferber specializes in the tradition of continental philosophy and in German thought (since the end of the 18th century). She examined, for instance, the connection between melancholy and philosophical truth in the writings of Walter Benjamin; Jewish laments and dirges as a unique form of expression in the early writings of Gershom Scholem; and the way language develops out of the aching body in the writings of Johann Gottfried Herder. In her recent works, Ferber has written about hearing and acoustics, both as an essential element in the capacity for empathy as the ability to listen to the suffering of another human being even when it is not expressed in a propositional manner, and in the context of the unique role of acoustics in the writings of Walter Benjamin on childhood.

Furthermore, Ferber's research touches upon the connection between suffering and time, between different forms of temporal experiences and the experience of pain and suffering. Ferber's preoccupation with time and the suffering body led to her recent research project that focuses on Jean Améry's philosophy of time, in which she examines Améry's unique and twisted conceptions of temporality as they appear in his central works on torture, aging, and suicide. The project was granted a research grant by the Israel Science Foundation.

=== Publications ===
As part of her research on the relations between emotions and language, Ferber published original articles dealing with the writings of Walter Benjamin, Gottfried Wilhelm Leibniz, Johann Gottfried Herder, Sigmund Freud, Martin Heidegger, Gershom Scholem, Jean Améry, and others.

Ferber has co-edited a number of books together with other researchers: A book about the role of moods in philosophy together with Prof. Hagi Kenaan; Two books on lament in the writings of Gershom Scholem, one in Hebrew co-edited together with Prof. Galili Shahar and another in English with Paula Schwebel; And a book in Spanish on violence and language which focuses on the grammar of the cry of pain, co-edited with Aïcha Liviana Messina and Andrea Potestà.

==== Philosophy and Melancholy: Benjamin's Early Reflections on Theatre and Language ====
Ferber's first book, Philosophy and Melancholy: Benjamin's Early Reflections on Theatre and Language, was published in 2013 by Stanford University Press. The book deals with the central role melancholy plays in the writings of Walter Benjamin, particularly in his ideas regarding the body, pain, loss, and their relation to philosophical truth. In the book, Ferber considers melancholy as being not solely a pathological emotional reaction to loss, but instead, explores the ways in which sadness and melancholy grant us a unique opportunity to reconsider the concept of truth and the inherent relation that Benjamin finds between melancholy and philosophical truth. Ferber makes use of psychoanalytic thought and points to the various ways in which it exceeds the pathological, tying it to Benjamin's arguments on the structure of truth, philosophical thought, and concepts related to his theory of drama (in particular, his writings on the German Trauerspiel and his early conception of language). Part of the book was published in Turkish under the title ״Melankoli Felsefesi: Sigmund Freud - Walter Benjamin״.

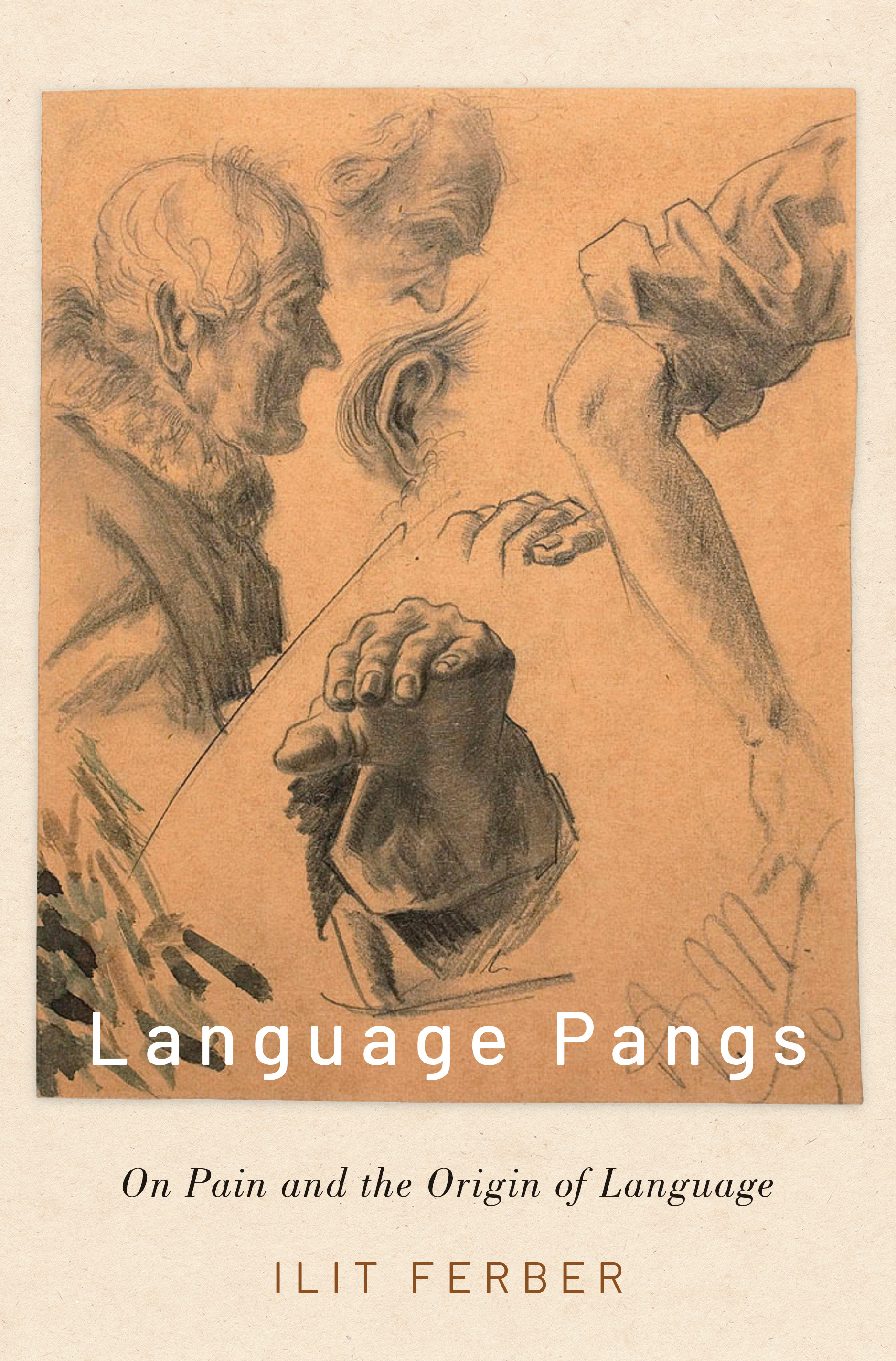
Book cover, Language Pangs: On Pain and the Origin of Language

==== Language Pangs: On Pain and the Origin of Language ====
Ferber's second book, Language Pangs: On Pain and the Origin of Language, was published in 2019 by Oxford University Press. A German translation was published in 2023. In the book, Ferber explores the intricate relationship between the aching and suffering body and the different expressions of pain it calls for and enables. The book challenges the common conceptions of pain and language as contradicting each other and offers a reconsideration of this relationship in terms of an essential interconnectedness. Its premise is that the experience of pain cannot be probed without consideration of its inherent relation to language, and vice versa: understanding the nature of language essentially depends on an account of its relationship with pain. The book brings together discussions of philosophical as well as literary texts, an intersection viewed here as especially productive in considering the phenomenology of pain and its bearing on language.

The book's first chapter presents a phenomenology of pain and its relation to language. Chapters 2 and 3 provide a close reading of Herder's Treatise on the Origin of Language (1772), which was the first modern philosophical text to bring together language and pain, establishing the cry of pain as the origin of language. The chapters emphasise Herder's important claims regarding the relationship between human and animal, sympathy, and the role of hearing in the experience of pain. Chapter 4 is devoted to Heidegger's seminar (1939) on Herder's text about language. Chapter 5 focuses on Sophocles’ story of Philoctetes, in terms of pain, expression, sympathy, and hearing, referring to further thinkers such as Stanley Cavell and André Gide.

== Selected publications ==
=== Books ===
- Language Pangs: On Pain and the Origin of Language (Oxford University Press, 2019). ISBN 978-0-19-005386-4
- Philosophy and Melancholy: Benjamin's Early Reflections on Theater and Language (Stanford University Press, 2013). ISBN 978-0-8047-8519-8
- Sprachwehen: Über Schmerz und den Ursprung der Sprache [Language Pangs: On Pain and the Origin of Language] [in German], Translated by Peter Brandes (Neofelis Verlag, 2023). ISBN 978-3-95808-418-6

=== Edited books ===
- Lamentations: Poetry and Thought in Gershom Scholem [in Hebrew], Co-Edited with Galili Shahar (Carmel, 2016).
- Escribir La Violencia. Hacia Una Gramatica Del Grito [Writing violence. Toward a grammar of the cry] [in Spanish], Co-Edited with A. Liviana- Messina and A. Potestà (Metales Pesados, 2019).
- Lament in Jewish Thought: Philosophical, Theological and Literary Perspectives, Co-Edited with Paula Schwebel (De Gruyter, 2014).
- Philosophy’s Moods: The Affective Grounds of Thinking, Co-Edited with Hagi Kenaan (Springer, 2011).

=== Selected articles ===
- “Walter Benjamin and the Acoustics of Childhood,” Angelaki, Vol. 27.5 (2022), pp. 37–55.
- “Sprache und Hören bei Herder“ [in German], in: Galili Shahar (Ed.), Geschichte und Repräsentation Sinne – Sprache – Bilder (Das Tel Aviver Jahrbuch für deutsche Geschichte 46), Göttingen: Wallstein Verlag, 2019, 11–32.
- “Wandering About Language,” Philosophy Today 61(4) (2017), pp. 1005–1012.
- “Pain as Yardstick: Jean Améry,” Journal of French and Francophone Philosophy, special issue on Jean Amery XXIV (3) (2016), pp. 3–16.
- “A Feel for Benjamin,” in The Future of Benjamin MLA Commons, Special issue ed.: Nitzan Lebovic (2015)
- ”Schmerz war ein Staudamm”: Benjamin on Pain,” Benjamin-Studien 3 (2014), pp. 165–177.
- “Lament and Pure Language: Scholem, Benjamin and Kant,” Jewish Studies Quarterly 21(1) (2014), pp. 42–54.

=== Selected book chapters ===
- “On Laws and Miracles,” in Religion in Reason: Metaphysics, Ethics, and Politics in Hent de Vries, (eds.) Martin Shuster, Tarek R. Dika (Routledge, forthcoming 2023), pp. 129–138.
- “In Voice Land”: Benjamin on Air”, in Forces of Education: Walter Benjamin and the Politics of Pedagogy, (eds.) Dennis Johanßen, Dominik Zechner (Bloomsbury, forthcoming), pp. 143–156.
- “Sadness and Photography: Barthes and Benjamin,” in Philosophy of Emerging Media Understanding, Appreciation, Application, eds. J. Floyd, J. E. Katz (Oxford University Press, 2016), pp. 206–216.
- “Language and Instability: Scholem and Bialik on Language and Secularization,” in Language as Bridge and Border: Linguistic, Cultural and Political Constellations in Eighteenth to Twentieth Century German-Jewish Thought, ed. S. Sander (Hentrich & Hentrich, 2015), pp. 179–194.
- “Stimmung: Heidegger and Benjamin,” in Sparks Will Fly: Walter Benjamin and Martin Heidegger, eds: A. Benjamin, D. Vardoulakis (SUNY, 2015), pp. 67–93.
