= Lior Kenan =

Israeli television personality

- ליאור קינן
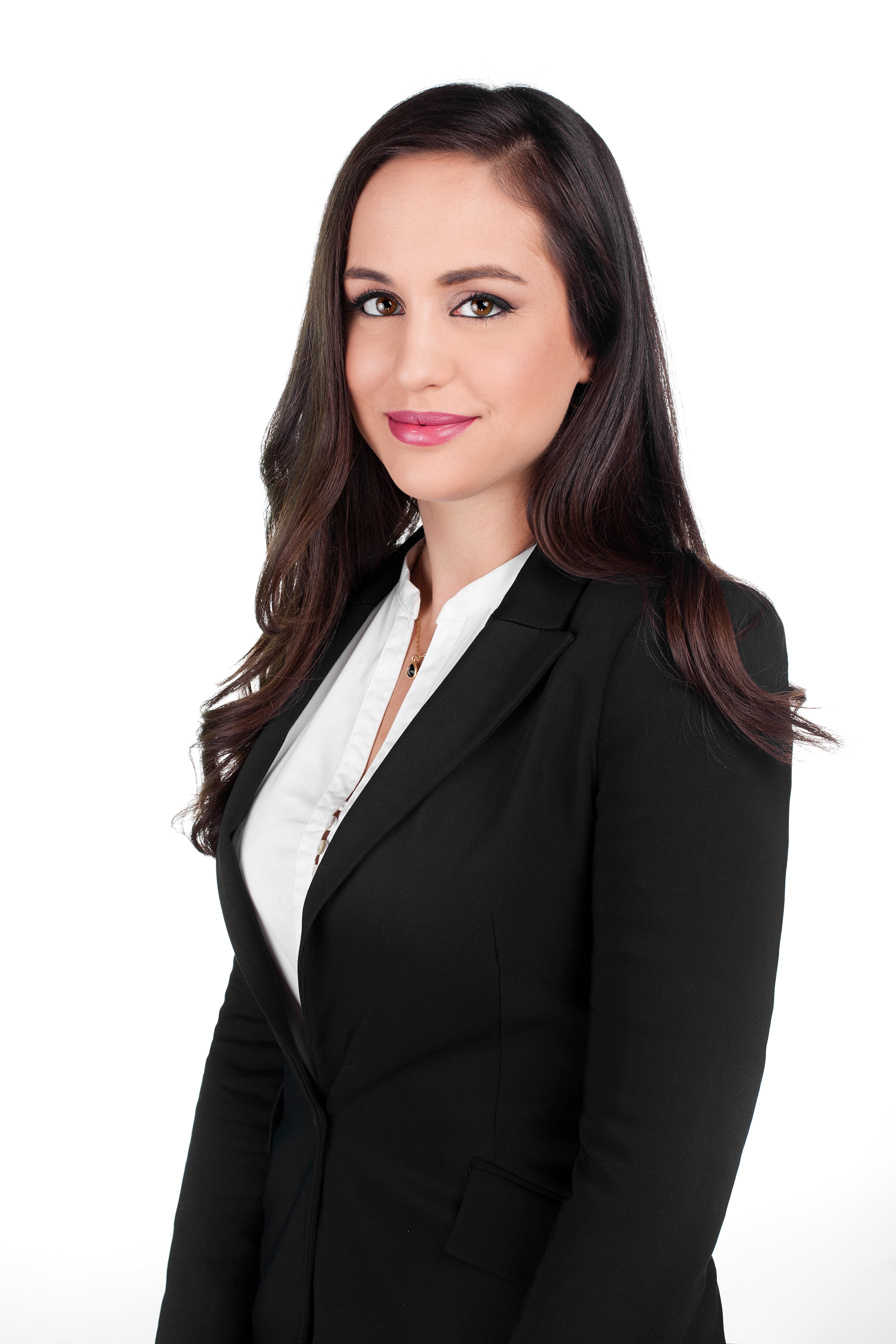
- Lior Kenan, 2014
- Born: July 25, 1989 (age 37); Pardesiya, Israel
- Citizenship: Israeli
- Education: Tel Aviv University
- Occupations: news presenter, journalist
- Years active: 2010–present
- Employer: Channel 13 (Israel)

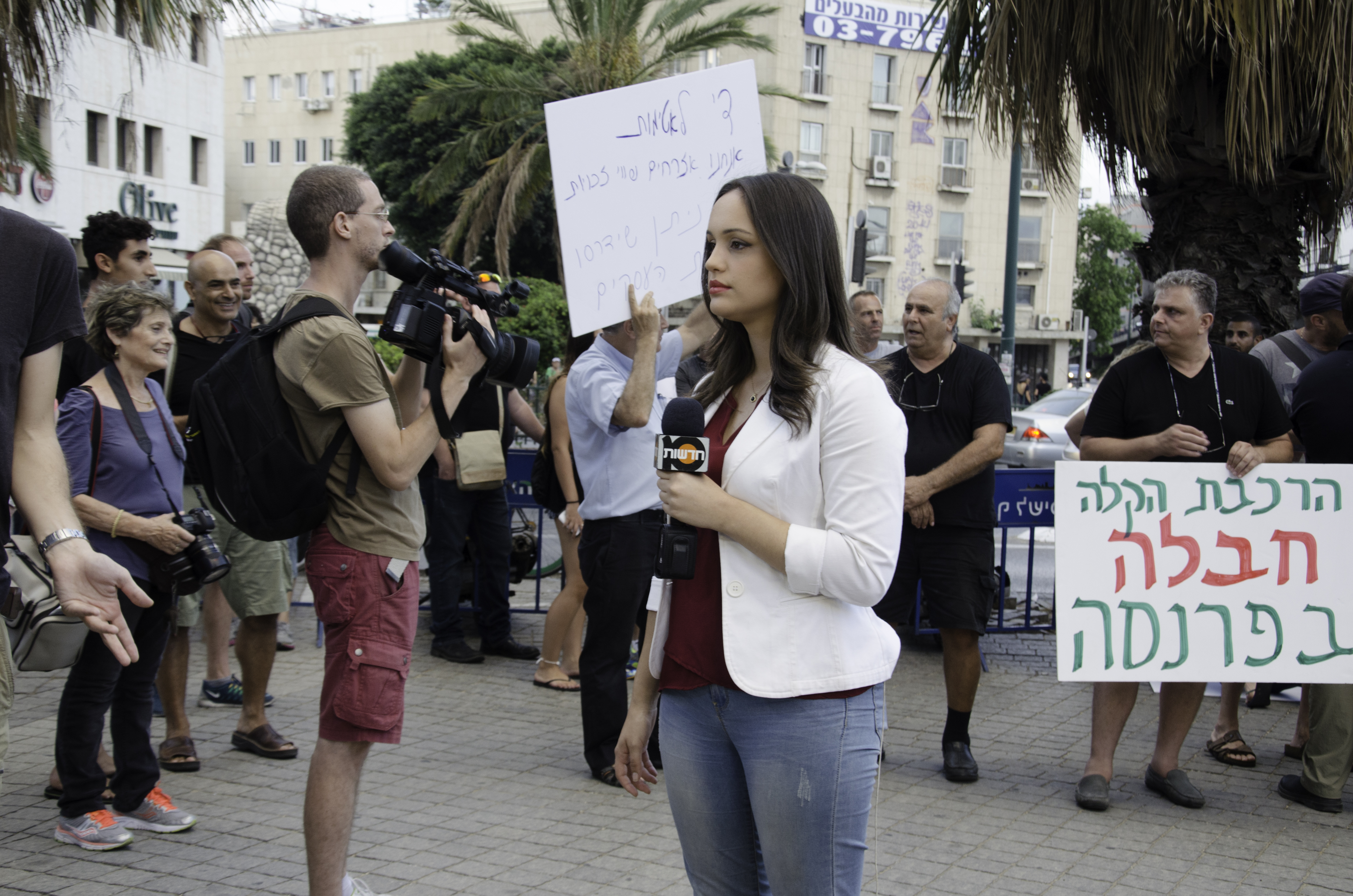
Lior Kenan as a transportation correspondent at Channel 10, 2015

Lior Kenan (Hebrew: ליאור קינן; born 25 July 1989) is an Israeli journalist and a television presenter, currently serving as a political correspondent and a news presenter for News 13.

== Biography ==
Kenan was born and raised in Pardesiya. Her grandfather was Brigadier General (Res.) Giora Ram (Forman), who served as Deputy Commander of the Israeli Air Force and Secretary General of the Kibboutz Artzi movement. Her last name was Hebraized (derived) from Kleinman.

Kenan graduated from Dror Educational Campus and was a member of the HaNoar HaOved VeHaLomed youth movement. She completed her military service in the IDF Spokesperson's Unit. After her discharge from the IDF in 2010, she began working at Channel 10 – initially as an investigative journalist and later as a reporters' coordinator.

In 2013, she was appointed as the channel's transportation correspondent, and in 2015, she also became the economics correspondent, in addition to her role in transportation. Kenan covered the Inbal Or affair and exposed Or's personal expenses that were paid using clients' funds.

In May 2018, she began co-hosting the morning show "Boker Or" ("Good Morning") on Channel 10 on Fridays and holiday evenings, alongside Or Heller. From June 2018 until January 2019, when Channel 10 was closed, the two also hosted the show on Wednesdays, following the departure of Orly and Guy from the channel's morning program.

After the merger of Reshet and Channel 10, she became a substitute presenter on the television program "Barcode," while continuing her work at News 13 as a consumer and transportation correspondent. In 2020, she began serving as a parliamentary correspondent at the Knesset.

Upon returning from maternity leave in October 2024, she was appointed as the channel's political correspondent, a position previously held by her husband, the journalist Sefi Ovadia.

In 2023, she temporarily hosted the news program "Shishi" ("Friday"), following Ayala Hasson's departure from News 13.

On 20 May 2025 Kenan said to Sky News Australia that Israel "worried" about the international pressure mounting over the past few days regarding its military offensive in Gaza war.

On 30 November 2025, Keinan said on the Reshet 13 news programmes Moriah and Berko and The Main Edition (HaMahadura HaMerkazit in Hebrew) that the Basic Law: The President of the State does not require that Israel's Prime Minister, Benjamin Netanyahu, admit guilt in order to receive a pardon from President Isaac Herzog for his trials in Cases 1000, 2000 and 4000.

=== Personal life ===
Kenan holds a bachelor's degree in law from Tel Aviv University. Her husband Ovadia is the political correspondent for News 13, and the couple has a daughter.

== See also ==
- Women in journalism and media professions
- Women in Israel
- Journalism in Israel
