= Neria Kraus =

Israeli radio and television personality

- נריה קראוס
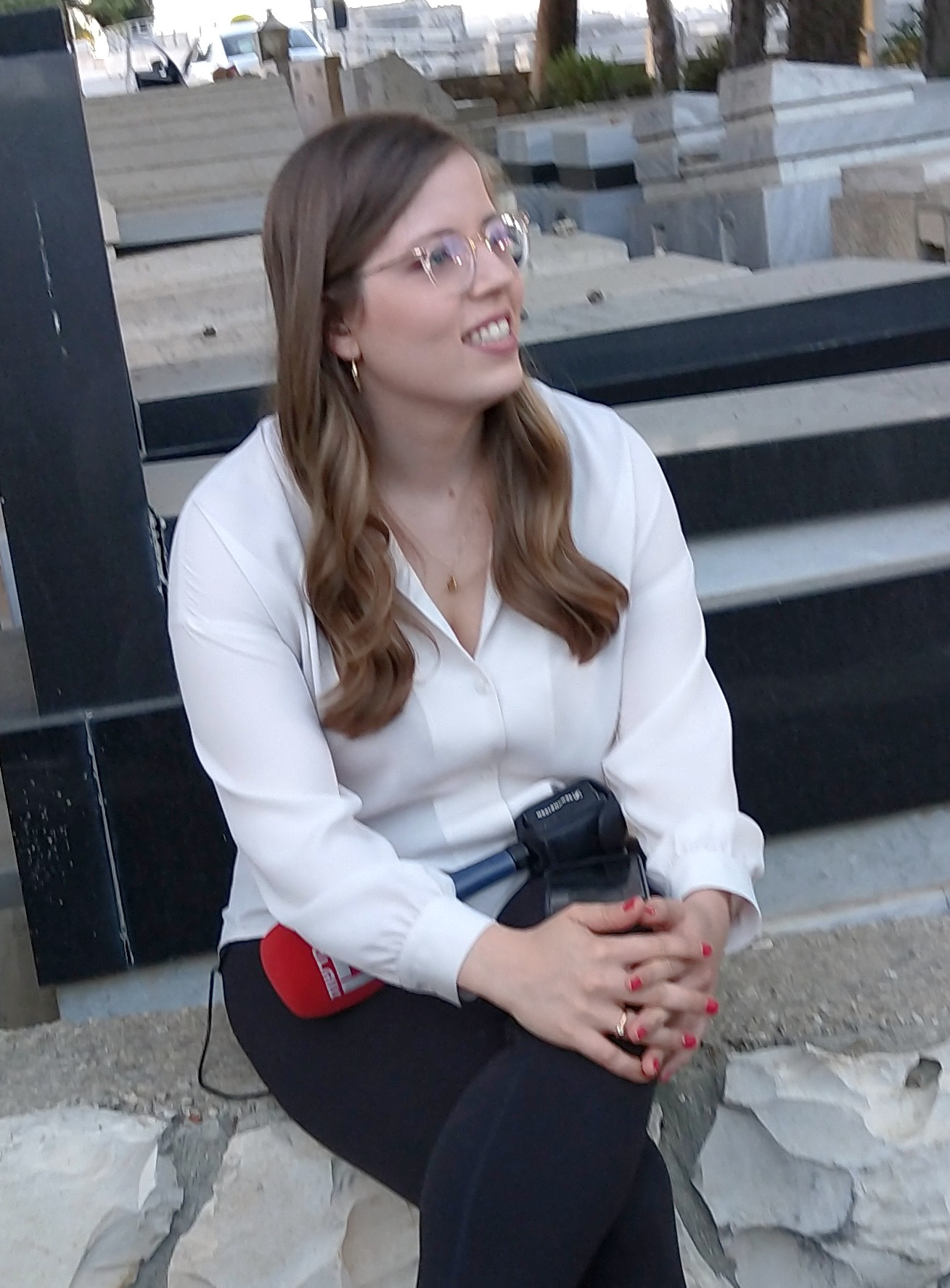
- Neria Kraus, 2022
- Born: 16 December 1993 (age 32); Tel Aviv, Israel
- Citizenship: Israeli
- Education: Hebrew University of Jerusalem
- Occupation: journalist
- Years active: 2011–present
- Employer: Channel 13 (Israel)

Neria Kraus (Hebrew: נריה קראוס; born 16 December 1993) is an Israeli journalist who serves as the United States correspondent for Channel 13 News. In 2023, she was selected by Forbes Israel as one of the 30 most promising young Israelis.

== Biography ==
Neria Kraus was born and raised in Tel Aviv in a traditional Jewish family. She attended Tichon Hadash High School in Tel Aviv, where she served as the chairwoman of the student council. During her youth, she worked as a youth reporter for the newspaper Ma'ariv La'noar and was one of the hosts of the youth television program "23 Dakot" ("23 Minutes") on the Israeli Educational Television.

She completed her military service at Galei Tzahal (Israel Army Radio). After her discharge, she joined the news desk of Yedioth Ahronoth as a reporters’ coordinator. In 2017, she joined Channel 10 as a reporter for the television program "Hakol Kalul" ("All Inclusive"), and from November 2019, she served as the culture editor for Channel 13 News.

Kraus holds a bachelor's degree in law from the Hebrew University of Jerusalem.

In June 2023, Kraus was selected to host the Jerusalem Pride and Tolerance Parade alongside journalist Eran Swisa. That year, the parade was the largest in the history of Jerusalem Pride events.

In January 2023, she concluded her role as culture editor and was appointed as Channel 13 News' correspondent in the United States.

In August 2023, United Airlines asked her to give her seat to an orthodox Jewish man on a flight from New York to Tel Aviv.

In November 2024, she asked Joe Biden about the Gaza war hostage crisis. Biden asked her whether she could keep from getting hit in the head by a camera behind her.

On 24 June 2025, the day of ceasefire between Israel and Iran, she asked Donald Trump about the hostages in Gaza. He told her that she was very nice, and asked her who she was.

=== Personal life ===
Before moving to the United States, Kraus began her master's studies in the Adi Lautman Interdisciplinary Program for Outstanding Students at Tel Aviv University.

Kraus is engaged to the author Ido Gefen.

== See also ==
- Women in journalism and media professions
- Women in Israel
- Journalism in Israel
