= Ehud Gazit =

Israeli biochemist and nanotechnologist

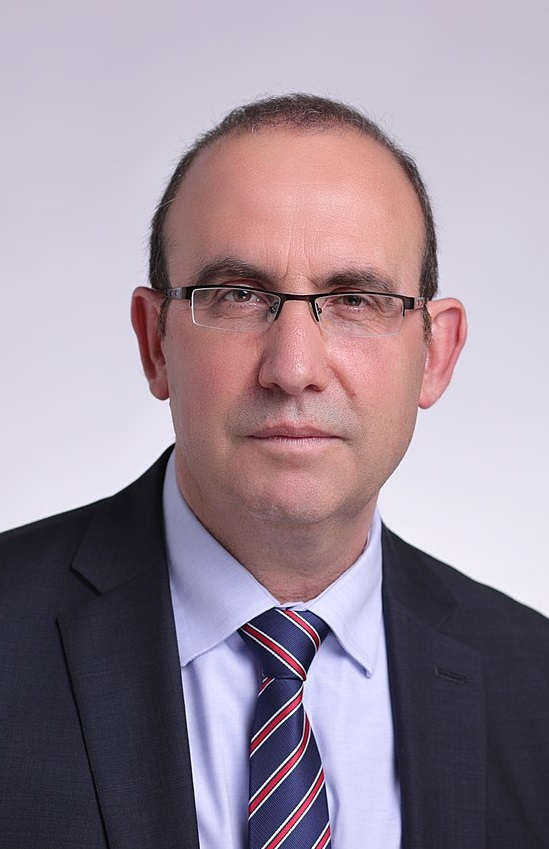
Prof. Ehud Gazit (2022)

Ehud Gazit (Hebrew: אהוד גזית) is an Israeli biochemist, biophysicist and nanotechnologist. He is Professor and Endowed Chair at Tel Aviv University and the Interim Chair of Fulbright Israel (from 2026). In 2015, he was knighted by the Italian Republic for services to science and society. In 2023, he was elected as the International Solvey Chair in Chemistry, a position that was previously held by 15 of the top world scientists including four Nobel laureates.

Ehud Gazit served on the Executive Board of Tel Aviv University for 8 years (2017-2025). He was earlier a member of the Israeli National Council for Research and Development (NCRD) between 2014 and 2019 by an appointment of the Israeli president. From 2012 to 2014 he served as the Chief Scientist of the Israeli Ministry of Science and Technology (MOST) and the coordinator of the forum of Chief Scientists of the Israeli ministries. From 2008 to 2012 Gazit served as Tel Aviv University Vice President for Research and Development, and the chairman of the board of directors of Ramot Ltd., the technology transfer company of Tel Aviv University. Prior to his appointment as vice president, Gazit served in different academic and administrative positions at Tel Aviv University, including the Head of The Chemistry-Biology double major track, a member of the University Committee for Appointments and Promotions, the Head of the Academic Committee of the Ilona Rich Institute for Nano-Biology and Nano-Biotechnology, and a member of the managing board of the Center for Nanoscience and Nanotechnology.

== Education ==
Gazit received his B.Sc. (summa cum laude) after completing his studies at the Adi Lautman Interdisciplinary Programme for Outstanding Students of Tel Aviv University, and his Ph.D. (with highest distinction) as a Clore Fellow at the Department of Membrane Research and Biophysics, Weizmann Institute of Science in 1997. For his Ph.D. work, he received the John F. Kennedy Award in 1996. He has been a faculty member at Tel Aviv University since 2000, after completing his postdoctoral studies as a European Molecular Biology Organization (EMBO) and Human Frontiers Science Program (HFSP) fellow at Massachusetts Institute of Technology (MIT) where he also had held a visiting appointment (2002–2011).

== Research ==
Gazit's research focused on the study of biomolecular self-assembly. He had transformed the fields of molecular medicine by his discovery of the ability of metabolites to form ordered supramolecular assemblies, denoted as "metabolite amyloids", which share common biological, chemical, and physical characteristics. He provided evidence that these assemblies are associated with human disease, evoke an immunological response, and that their cerebral deposition is observed post mortem. This discovery resulted in a paradigm shift in the study of amyloid self-assembly, inborn errors of metabolism disorders, and neurodegenerative diseases. This achievement is a far-reaching extension of the concept of protein aggregation to include a significantly larger class of biomolecules that form generic, thermodynamically favorable, nano-architectures of a notable pathological role.

This discovery was a directed continuation of his achievements in the study of protein amyloids, including the pioneering mechanistic characterization of the self-assembly of amyloid structures by extremely short peptide fragments, the identification of oligomeric assemblies, and the development of inhibition technologies. His work also led to the development of a branch of peptide nanotechnology that is currently being studied by hundreds of research groups around the world. This activity involves the discovery of a novel class of peptide nanostructures with unique physical properties that are useful for numerous technological applications. His work resulted in the identification of minimal recognition elements that facilitate the assembly of amyloid fibrils and identified novel ways to inhibit this process. His laboratory was the first to identify aromatic dipeptides that form nanotubes and nanospheres of unique mechanical and chemical properties. The applications of these nano-assemblies for ultra-sensitive biosensors applications, energy-storage devices, and the fabrication of metallic nanowires were demonstrated.

His work was published in more than 400 publications in some of the most prestigious academic journals including Science, Nature, Nature Nanotechnology, Nature Chemical Biology, Nature Physics, Nature Catalysis, Cell, the Proceedings of the US National Academy of Sciences, and many more. He is also the inventor of over 100 patents including 54 granted US patents.

== Honors ==
Gazit had received numerous awards and honors including Landau Research Award, Dan David Scholarship Award and Prize for excellence in research from the Research Council of Tel Aviv University. Gazit's technology transfer achievements was acknowledged by inclusion in the 2008 list of 100 Innovations from academic Research to Real-World Application by the Association of University Technology Managers (AUTM) and in a list of 100 Technology Offers stemming from EU Biotechnology RTD results of three Research Framework Programmes (FP5, FP4, and FP3). In 2009 he received the Hestrin Award for a leading scientist under the age of 44. In 2012 he was elected as a fellow of the Royal Society of Chemistry (FRSC). In 2015 he was elected as a Member of the European Molecular Biology Organization (EMBO). In 2018 he was elected as a Foreign Fellow of The National Academy of Sciences, India. In 2019 he awarded with the Rappaport Prize for Excellence in the Field of Biomedical Research. In 2022, he was elected as a Fellow of the US National Academy of Inventors.

== Public service ==
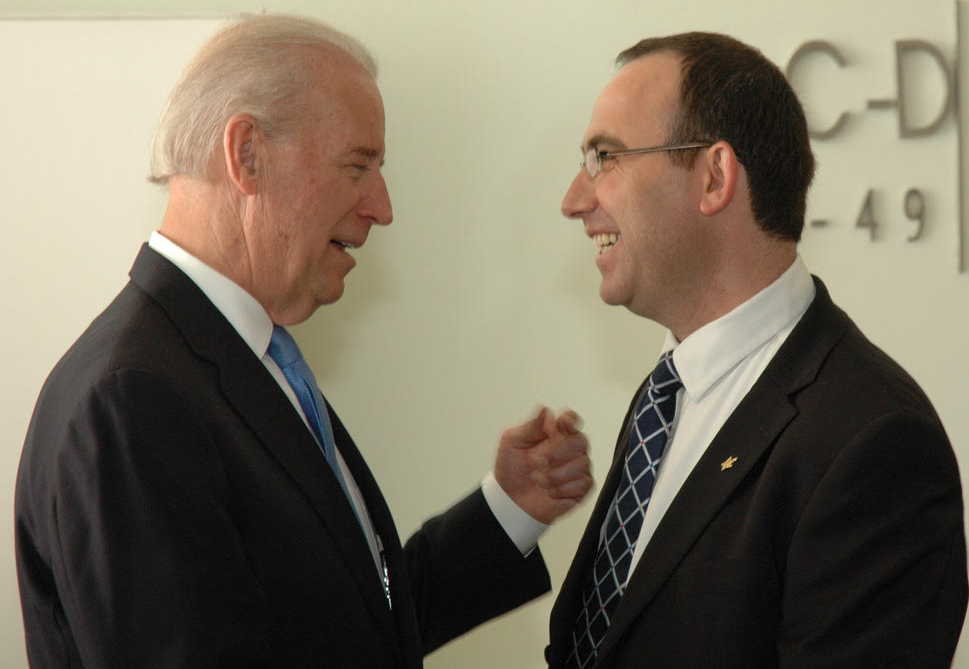
A meeting between Prof. Gazit and Joe Biden at Tel Aviv University, 11.3.2010

Gazit served and serves at various positions related to science and technology at the national and international level. From 2003 to 2009 he served on the International Relations Committee of the Biophysical Society. He also served as one of Strategic Research Program (SRP) Leaders of the EC Nano2Life Network of Excellence, an expert of the European Observatory of Nanobiotechnology (EoN), and a resident expert in the field of NanoBiology of Science At Stake. He is or was on the editorial board of several journals including Journal of Bionanoscience, Nanomedicine, PLoS ONE, Amyloid, Journal of Peptide Science and Current Chemical Biology.

He was a member of the Executive Council of "Access for All" program (Hebrew: אוניברסיטה בעם), member of the UK-Israel Life Science Council, member of the Public council of the program for implantation of science in government initiated by the Israel Society for Ecology and Environmental Studies, Member of the board of trustees of the Eric and Sheila Samson Prime Minister's Prize for Innovation in Alternative Fuels for Transportation, and member of the steering committee of the Yuval Ne'eman workshop for science, technology and security. He was a member (and chairman from 2008 to 2011) of executive board, The Interdisciplinary Center for Technology Analysis & Forecasting.

== Books ==
- Gazit E. (2007) Plenty of Room for Biology at the Bottom: Introduction to Bionanotechnology. Imperial College Press, London, UK. ISBN 1-86094-677-1.
  - Translated also to Russian and edited: Gazit E. (2011) Nanobiotehnologiya. (Neobyatnye perspektivy razvitiya Russian: Газит E. (2011) Нанобиотехнология: необъятные перспективы развития). ISBN 5-91522-227-7
- Gazit, E., and R. Nussinov (Eds.) (2008) Nanostructure Design Protocols: Methods in Molecular Biology. Humana Press, Totowa NJ, USA. ISBN 1-934115-35-5
