= Hatikva Quarter =

Neighbourhood of Tel Aviv, Israel

Coordinates: 32°03′N 34°47′E

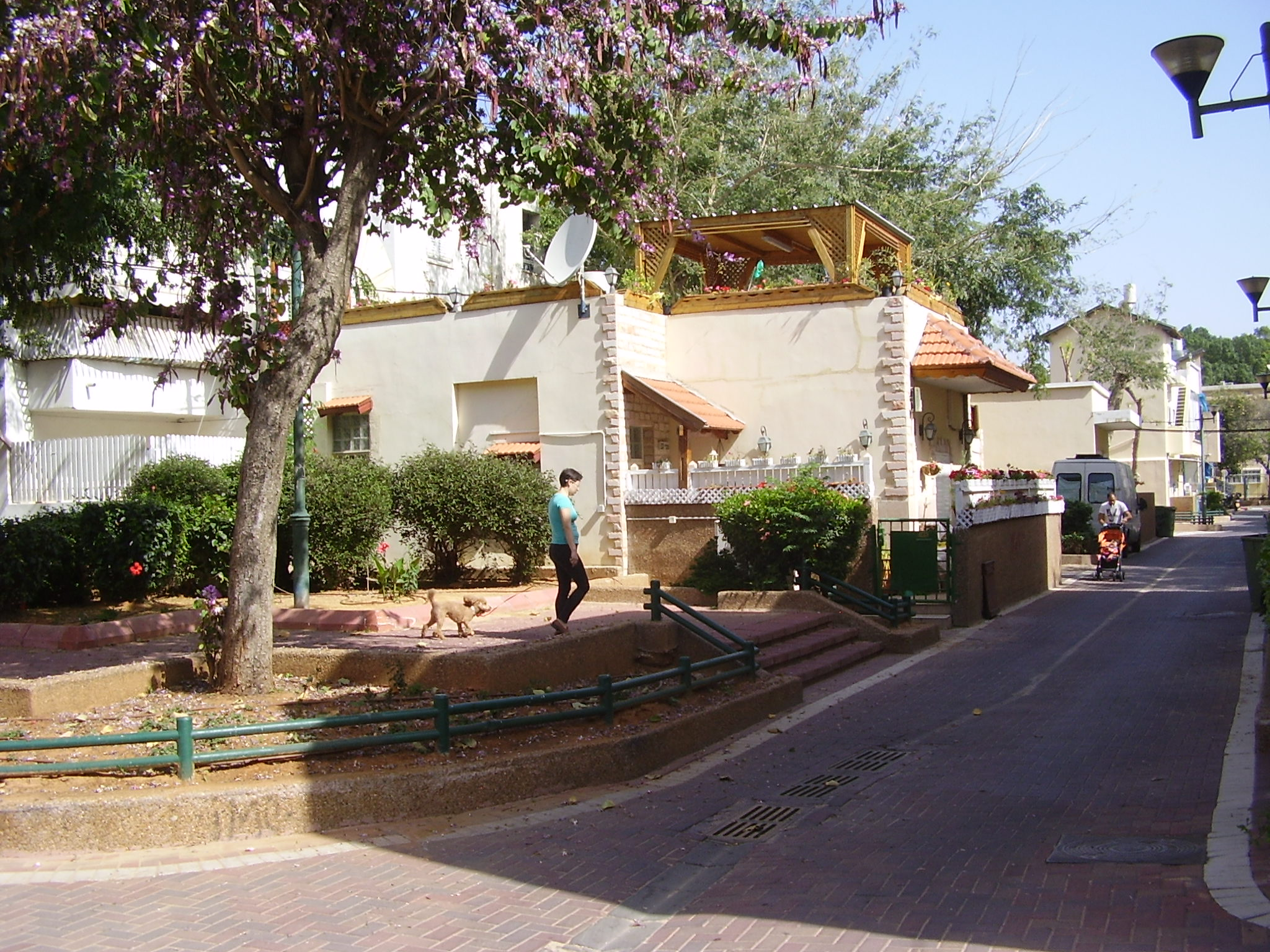
A street in Hatikva

Hatikva Quarter (Hebrew: שכונת התקווה, Shkhunat Hatikva) is a working class neighbourhood in southeastern Tel Aviv, Israel.

== History ==
The quarter was founded in 1935, named for "Mount Hope" ("Har HaTikva" in Hebrew), a farm built in 1853 by Protestant Prussian and American Protestants and abandoned. Johann Steinbeck was the grandfather of John Steinbeck and abandoned the colony in 1858 after Arab attackers killed his brother and raped his brother's wife and mother-in-law.

It was soon repopulated as a working class Temani neighborhood. The neighborhood was the site of the Battle of Hatikva Quarter on 8 December, 1947, one of the first battles of the 1947-48 Civil War in Mandatory Palestine, when it was attacked by Hasan Salama's forces. It became part of the Tel Aviv municipal area after the 1948 Arab–Israeli War.

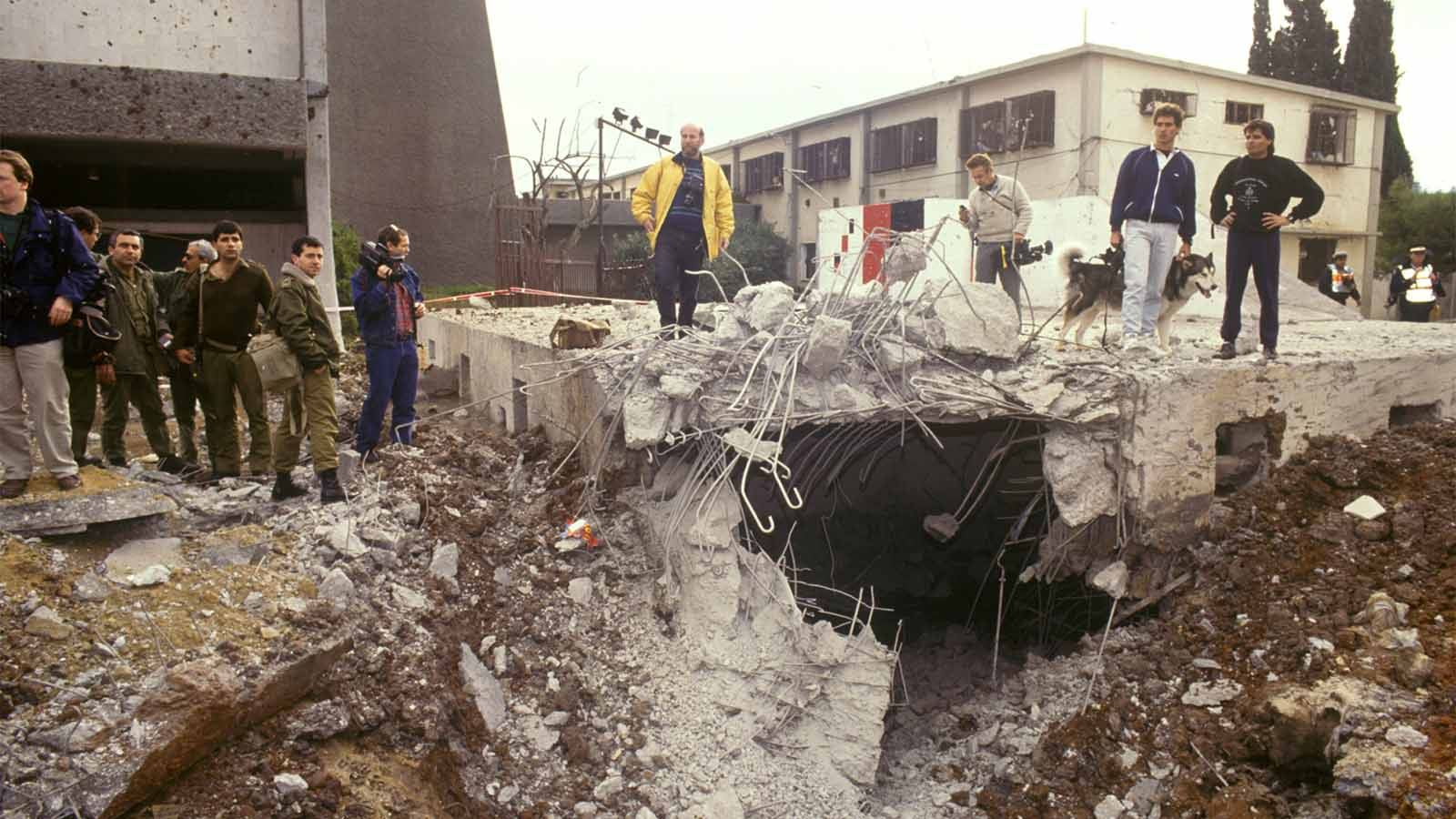
Shelter hit during the First Gulf War

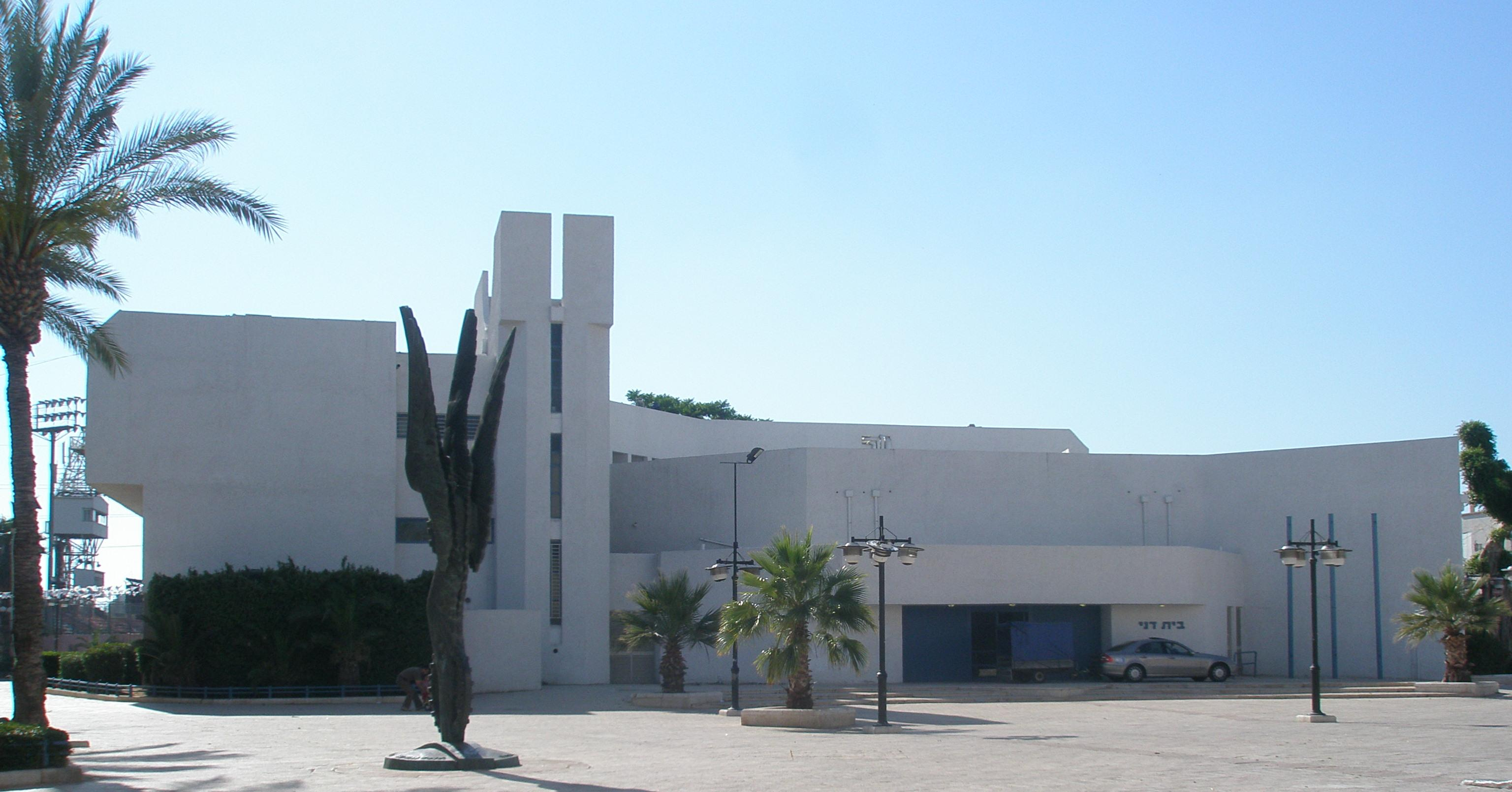
Beit Dani community center

On 19 January 1991 during the First Gulf War a shelter just in front of Beit Dani was directly hit by an Iraqi Scud rocket. Although the shelter was used by the neighbours regularly, just on this day after the alarm the lock malfunctioned. So, because of this empty shelter no one was hurt or killed. To commemorate the escape an iron memorial (named "Angel of peace") with 3 wings was erected in 1992 in front of Beit Dani, inscribed at the bottom with biblical words in Hebrew ("covering with their wings" (Exodus 25:20)).

Bnei Yehuda Tel Aviv football club played at the Hatikva Neighborhood Stadium until moving to Bloomfield Stadium. The headquarters of the Israeli Labor Party is located there.

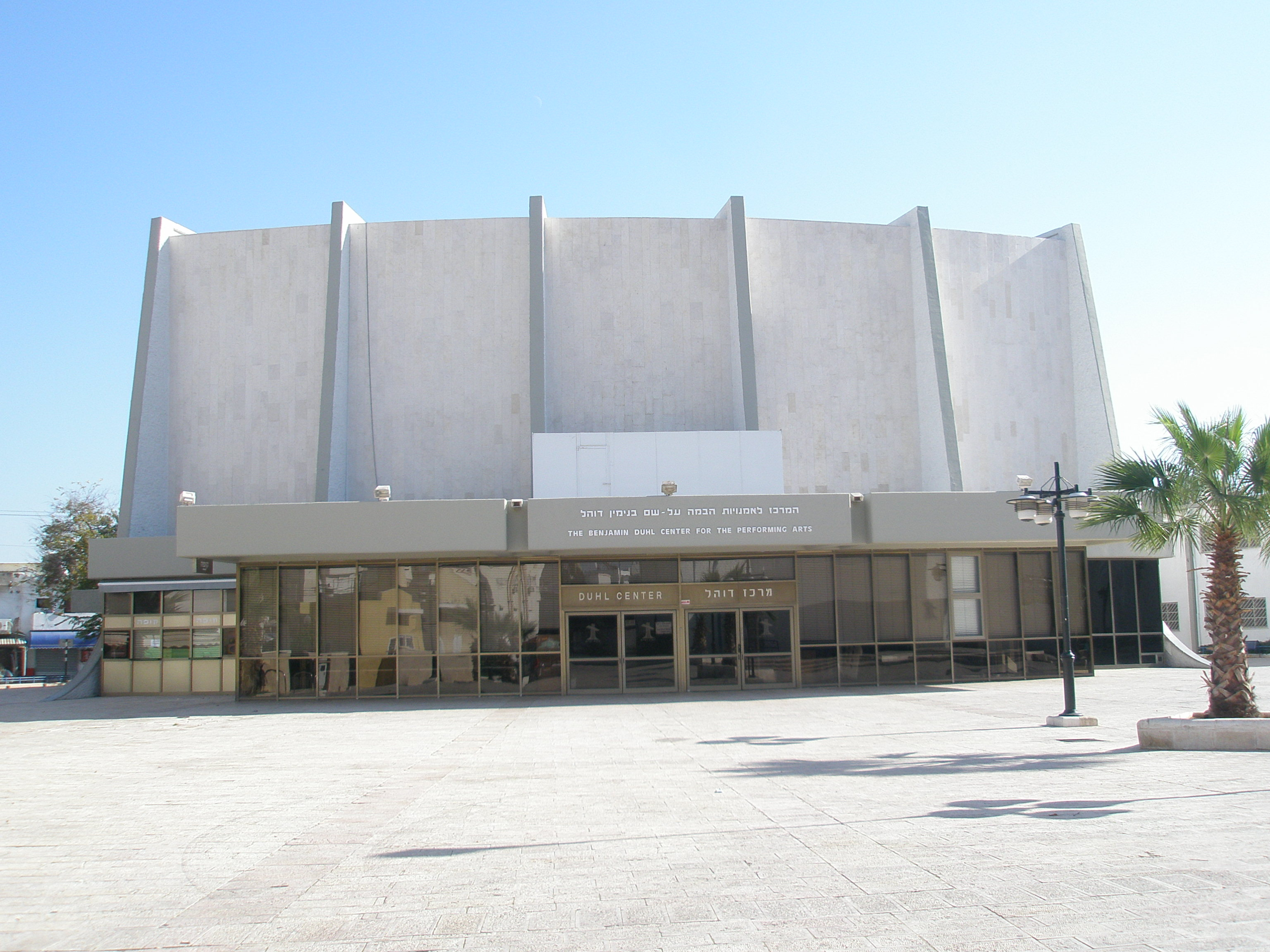
Duhl Center for the Performing Arts

The Shevah Mofet school is located on the site of the Steinbeck farm house. The neighbourhood is also home to the Yoram Loewenstein Performing Arts Studio, where some of Israel's leading actors trained.

== Notable residents ==
- Ofra Haza (1957–2000), singer and actress
- Haim Moshe (born 1955), singer
- Tomer Kapon (born 1985), film and television actor
- Goel Ratzon (born 1950)

== See also ==
- Neighborhoods of Tel Aviv
- Bnei Yehuda FC
