= Elad Ratson =

Israeli diplomat

- אֶלְעָד רָצוֹן
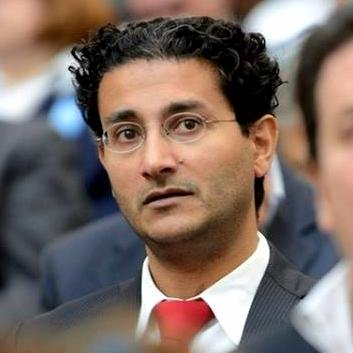
- Head of Data Diplomacy R&D Unit; Israeli Ministry of Foreign Affairs
- Assumed office August 2017
- President: Reuven Rivlin
- Prime Minister: Benjamin Netanyahu

Director of Research & Development Israeli Ministry of Foreign Affairs
- In office September 2015 – July 2017

Director of Public Relations Embassy of Israel in France
- In office April 2011 – August 2015

Deputy Chief of Mission Embassy of Israel in Cote d'Ivoire
- In office January 2010 – April 2011

Personal details
- Education: Carleton University
- Alma mater: Tel Aviv University; Israel Foreign Affairs Academy
- Occupation: Research & Development
- Profession: Career Diplomat
- Known for: Pioneering in the field of Digital diplomacy
- Awards: Linkedin France 2014 4th Most Influential PR
- Website: Twitter; Linkedin; Telegram

Military service
- Branch/service: Air Force
- Years of service: 1993-1997
- Rank: Lieutenant
- Unit: AF Special Forces Command

Elad Ratson (Hebrew: אֶלְעָד רָצוֹן, also Elad Ratzon) is an Israeli Diplomat and a Digital Diplomacy expert, Head of Israel's Ministry of Foreign Affairs Data Diplomacy R&D Unit. Ratson's previous Diplomatic positions include Deputy Chief of Mission of the Embassy of Israel in Côte d'Ivoire, Director of Public Relations of the Embassy of Israel in France and Director of Research & Development at the Israeli Ministry of Foreign Affairs headquarters in Jerusalem. Ratson is most known for his work in the field of Digital diplomacy, the use of Social Media in Politics, the effects of Social media on the practice of Diplomacy and the Agenda-setting effect of social media on public opinion.

== Career ==
In December 2008, Ratson was invited to attend Israel's Ministry of Foreign Affairs Diplomatic Academy, the principal mechanism through-which the Israeli Foreign Service recruits diplomats into service. His diplomatic training included six months of theoretical and academic studies, followed by six months of on-the-job training in various departments of the ministry.

=== Deputy Chief of Mission - Israeli Embassy, Côte d'Ivoire ===
In January 2010 Ratson was appointed Deputy Chief of Mission (DCM) of the Embassy of Israel in Côte d'Ivoire, a position that ended prematurely as the country plunged into a Civil War in March 2011. In an interview he gave to the Israeli daily Ynet on 14 January 2011, several weeks before the Civil War broke, Ratson recounted the reality in the country: "The embassy's economic activity has reached an almost complete standstill, and our focus now is on securing the small community of Israelis that is left in the country". On 9 April 2011, two days before the arrest of Ivorian President Gbagbo, which marked the end of the civil war, Ratson and the remaining three Israeli diplomats were evacuated to Ghana by United Nations UNOCI forces in an operation commanded by Jordanian UN forces.

=== Director of Public Relations - Israeli Embassy, France ===
Following the temporary closure of the Embassy of Israel in Côte d'Ivoire, in April 2011, Ratson was appointed as Director of Public Relations of the Embassy of Israel in France, a mission which lasted until August 2015.

A farewell interview with Ratson at the end of his diplomatic term in France quoted him mentioning the Toulouse and Montauban shootings on 19 March 2012, as a pivotal moment. Reportage by Times of Israel journalist Elhanan Miller from 30 May 2013, quotes Ratson saying that the assassination of three Jewish children and a parent at Ozar Hatorah school in Toulouse by the young French of Algerian origin Mohammed Merah, propelled him to focus his work on Interfaith dialogue, notably between the French Muslim community and Israel.

David Horovitz, in a Times of Israel article from 6 February 2019 sheds light on yet another significance, the August 2015 "Tel Aviv sur Seine" affair, that appears to have played a major role in shaping Ratson's diplomatic career in the years to follow. Horovitz quotes a senior diplomatic source within the Israeli Ministry of Foreign Affairs describing the Tel Aviv sur Seine affair as "so potentially dramatic, and its faked origin so revelatory", that it drove the Israeli Ministry of Foreign Affairs to "set up an R&D department for Algorithmic Diplomacy in the [foreign] ministry" in Jerusalem, with Ratson as its Head.

In an Article published by Ratson on the Tel Aviv sur Seine affair on 19 August 2015, he drew on the investigative work done by Belgian Social Media researcher Nicolas Vanderbiest on the Tel Aviv sur Seine affair, and the following corroborating piece by French Software Engineer and blogger Kadda Sahnine, describing how a handful of French extremists kidnapped the entire news agenda in France, for nearly a week, by manipulating Twitter with sophisticated Astroturfing techniques.

=== Director of R&D - Foreign Affairs Ministry, Jerusalem ===
From September 2015 to July 2017 Ratson served as Director of Research and Development of the Ministry of Foreign Affairs of Israel in Jerusalem, charged with "developing innovative algorithms and software with the purpose of advancing and promoting diplomatic objectives".

In what is described in the interview as a unique digital approach to diplomacy, Ratson is quoted explaining his work is to focus on "develop[ing] software which harnesses the massive influence which Digital Media has on the way people formulate their world view and use it to either advance the spread of positive narratives or inhibit the spread of violent narratives".

=== Head of Data Diplomacy R&D - Foreign Affairs Ministry, London ===
As of August 2017, Ratson has been serving as the Head of the Data Diplomacy R&D Unit of the Israeli Ministry of Foreign Affairs, based in the Embassy of Israel in the UK.

== Digital Diplomacy ==
=== Pioneering Algorithmic Diplomacy ===
Ratson is one of the first diplomats to introduce an algorithmic approach to the practice of diplomacy. An official Israeli Ministry of Foreign Affairs publication dated December 2017, described Ratson's diplomatic role the following:

Ratson is credited with pioneering a new subfield within digital diplomacy which experts refer to as Code-Based or Algorithmic Diplomacy - the harnessing of algorithms to influence the flow of country related narratives in the online matrix. Ratson is also one of the first traditional diplomats to be tasked with translating diplomatic objectives into code language

— Israel Ministry of Foreign Affairs, 2nd International Conference on Digital Diplomacy (5 December 2017)

=== Combating Manipulation of Social Media ===
A series of press articles published in both the Israeli and international press, in the run-up for the April 2019 Israeli elections shed light on Ratson's role, within the Israeli Ministry of Foreign Affairs, in detecting and preventing online Foreign electoral intervention in Israel.

The Israeli daily Haaretz reported on 29 January 2019, that Twitter has suspended 343 accounts linked to foreign fake news manipulation campaigns aimed at the Israeli public, ahead of the April 9 election. The information in the report is attributed to Israel's Foreign Affairs Ministry Elad Ratson.

An article by Agence France-Presse published on 8 April 2019, quotes Ratson commenting on Foreign electoral intervention in the April 2019 Israeli elections:

We have identified five foreign attempts of disinformation in a level of sophistication indicating a state involvement, once it became apparent in November that Israel was heading for early elections.

— Agence France-Presse, Israel seeks to beat election cyber bots (8 April 2019)

The same article quotes the reputable Israeli white hat hacker Noam Rotem, speaking on his activities to identify and eliminate social media sockpuppet accounts saying: "If they [the social media companies] don't listen to us, we involve other professionals like Ratson from the Foreign Ministry".

=== Confronting Online Hate & Radicalization ===
There are several journalistic and academic sources which provide information on the algorithmic nature of Ratson's work with respect to combating the spread of Terrorism on social media, most notably the development of a unique technology that is capable of removing social media posts and "bursting" social media echo chambers and filter bubbles. An article published by USA Today on 25 August 2016, reported:

Elad Ratson, a representative of the Israeli Foreign Ministry, said the government has developed online algorithms to identify and take down online posts that incite assaults. In addition, other ministries have worked on a system to find potential attackers based on their online comments in support of violence and a desire to avenge the death of a relative by Israeli forces.

— USA Today, Palestinian stabs Israeli amid a recent drop in attacks (25 August 2016)

Another article by Israeli online news website Ynetnews from 27 December 2016, sheds more light on the capabilities of the technology that was developed:

Only after the development of a unique technological system allowing the Foreign Ministry to monitor the way Facebook responds to users' reports, it managed—through technological means—to bring about the removal of 7,133 posts (53 percent of the reported posts).

— Ynetnews, Foreign Ministry accuses Facebook of failing to remove thousands of inciting posts (27 December 2016)

Oxford University researcher Ilan Manor, who studies the effects of digitization on the practice of diplomacy, dedicated a chapter in his book The Digitization of Public Diplomacy, to the analysis of Israel's Algorithmic Diplomacy model, following an "interview with the Director of Israeli Algorithmic Diplomacy". His conclusions shed light on the technical aspects of Ratson's work:

The Israeli MFA has determined that the best way to counter the echo chamber effect is to manipulate social media algorithms and burst filter bubbles through digital assets, or individuals who can transmit positive information about Jews into gated communities that hold negative opinions of Jews or Israelis. The activities of the Israeli MFA are less dependent on traditional public diplomacy assets and are more focused on developing new digital skillsets.

— Ilan Manor, The Digitization of Public Diplomacy (2019)
