= Hayom Shehaya =

Hayom Shehaya logo

Hayom Shehaya (Hebrew: הַיוֹם שֶׁהָיָה, lit. The Day That Was) is an Israeli late night current events program, broadcast on Israeli TV's Channel 10.

The show has been on air since June 2003. It is aired every evening at the end of the prime time schedule, usually at 22:30 pm. It is broadcast live and presented by Israeli radio and media persona Guy Zohar. Sometimes Tali Moreno takes his place. Ze'ev Chasper edited the show from its inception with a break in 2007–2008 to serve as channel 10's website's manager. Hanoch Daum hosted the show that year.

Hayom Shehaya offers an alternative to the traditional news narrative through the introduction of personal commentary, irony and comic moments. Zohar also asks viewers to send in clips via cell phone, which he watches on a computer screen and comments on in real time.

== See also ==
- Television in Israel
