= Tamar Ish-Shalom =

Israeli television presenter

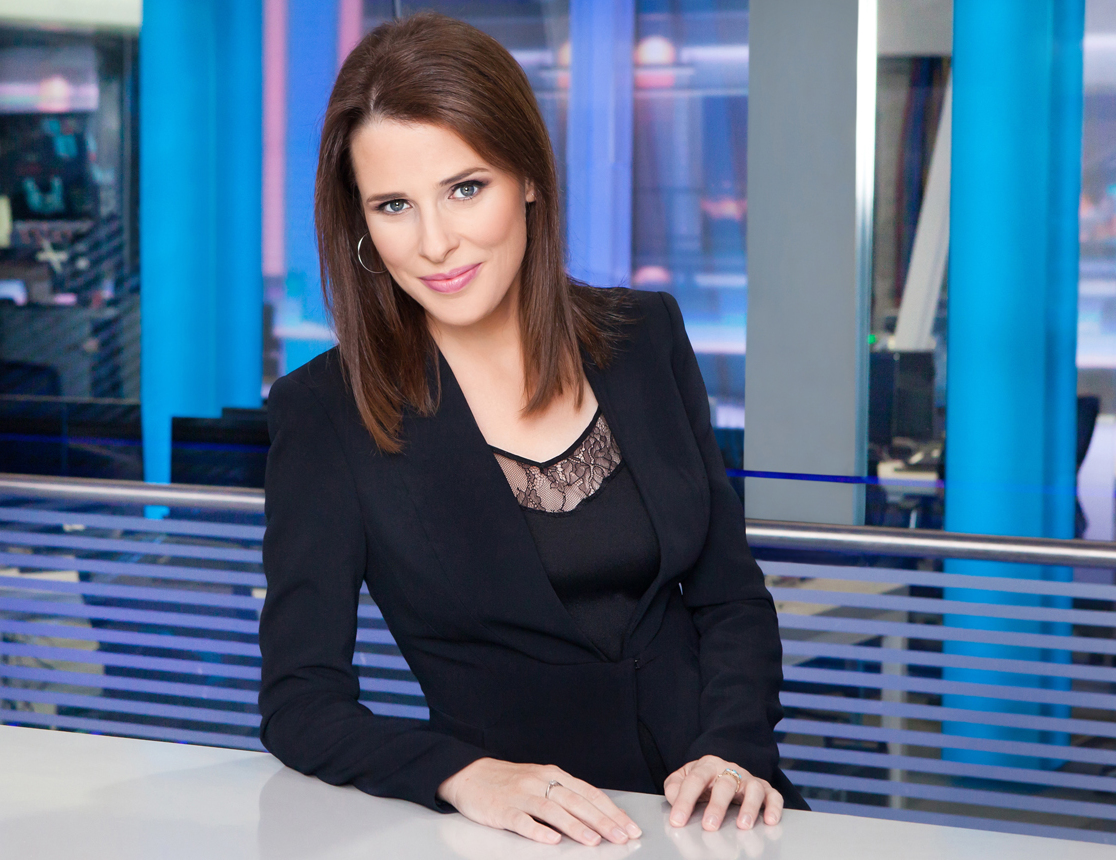
Tamar Ish-Shalom

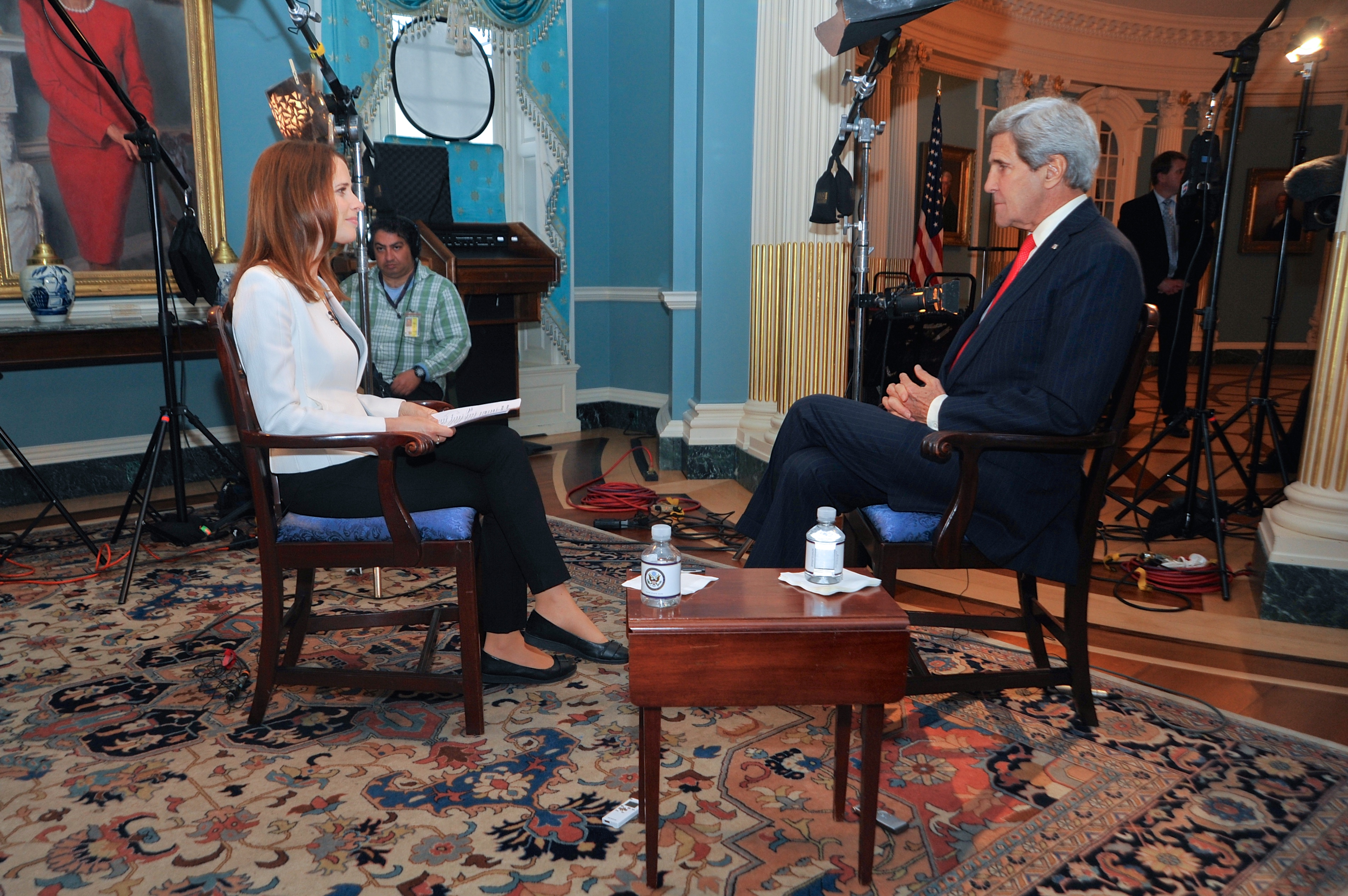
Tamar Ish-Shalom interviewing Secretary of State John Kerry on the Iranian Nuclear Program, April 2015

Tamar Ish-Shalom (Hebrew: תָּמָר אִישׁ-שָׁלוֹם) is an Israeli journalist and television presenter. She currently serves as a news anchor for Channel 13.

She attended high school in Hebrew University Secondary School.

In 2011, she began presenting the weekly News10 for Channel 10 after Miki Haimovich said she would retire.
