= Adi Lautman Interdisciplinary Program for Outstanding Students =

Tel Aviv University program

The Adi Lautman Interdisciplinary Program for Outstanding Students is a Tel Aviv University program for fostering excellence, leading to a Master's degree. Only 15 students are admitted to the program every year. "The highly competitive selection is based on applicants’ scores in the Israeli Standardized Matriculation and Psychometric exams, a short essay, a personal interview, and a concourse examination. Thus, the students participating in the program have outstanding intellectual potential and are motivated and capable of hard work and independent thinking."

The program was established in 1985 by Prof. Yehuda Elkana, to enable exceptionally gifted students to explore and conduct interdisciplinary research. Elkana led the program for nine years, until 1994. In 1995 the program was named after the late Adi Lautman, an alumnus of the program and the son of Israeli industrialist and businessman Dov Lautman.

The current head of the program is Prof. Liad Mudrik, an alumna of the program.

According to Naama Friedmann, a former head of the program, "the world is going toward questions and research that simply cannot be done from within only one discipline [...] Today, big questions can be answered either by collaborations between researchers from various disciplines [...] or by a researcher who has strong bases in several disciplines. Either you can work together or you yourself should be interdisciplinary.”

== Notable alumni ==
- Yuval Adler, director and screenwriter, creator of the film Bethlehem
- Shimon Adaf, author and poet
- Yair Agmon, writer and film director
- Maya Arad, writer
- Avner Dorman, composer
- Eli Drezner, professor of philosophy at Tel Aviv University
- Dov Elbaum, writer
- Naama Friedmann, neuropsychologist of language
- Ehud Gazit, biochemist, biophysicist, nanotechnologist. Former Vice President of Tel Aviv University. Former Chief Scientist of the Israeli Ministry of Science
- Ido Geiger, professor of philosophy at Ben-Gurion University
- Arik Glasner, author and critic, winner of the Bernstein Prize
- Lilach Hadany, professor at Tel Aviv University
- Ran Hassin, professor of psychology at the Hebrew University of Jerusalem
- Ori Hollander, author and musician
- Assaf Inbari, writer
- Etgar Keret, writer, professor of Hebrew literature at Ben-Gurion University
- Neria Kraus, journalist
- Idan Landau, linguist, blogger, professor at Ben-Gurion University
- Shai Lavi, head of the Van Leer Jerusalem Institute, professor of law at Tel Aviv University
- Reshef Levi, screenwriter, playwright, film director, producer, comedian
- Yannets Levi, writer, dramatist, TV host
- Liad Mudrik, journalist, professor of psychology at Tel Aviv University
- Yuli Novak, Breaking the Silence CEO (2012–2017)
- Yotam Ottolenghi, chef, restaurant owner, food writer
- Dan Pelleg, dancer and choreographer
- Yechezkel Rachamim, writer, winner of the Israel Prime Minister's Prize for Hebrew Authors
- Aviv Regev, computational biologist, Executive Vice President of Genentech Research and Early Development
- Maayan Roichman, one of the first two Israeli Rhodes Scholars (2017)
- Lior Rokach, data scientist and professor at Ben-Gurion University
- Ori Simchen, professor of philosophy at the University of British Columbia
- Sivan Toledo, professor of computer science at Tel Aviv University
- Barak Weiss, professor of mathematics at Tel Aviv University
- Yair Weiss, professor of computer science at the Hebrew University of Jerusalem
- Yoad Winter, professor of linguistics at Utrecht University
- Ghil'ad Zuckermann, linguist, revivalist, professor of linguistics and endangered languages at the University of Adelaide
