= Channel 13 News =

Israeli television news service

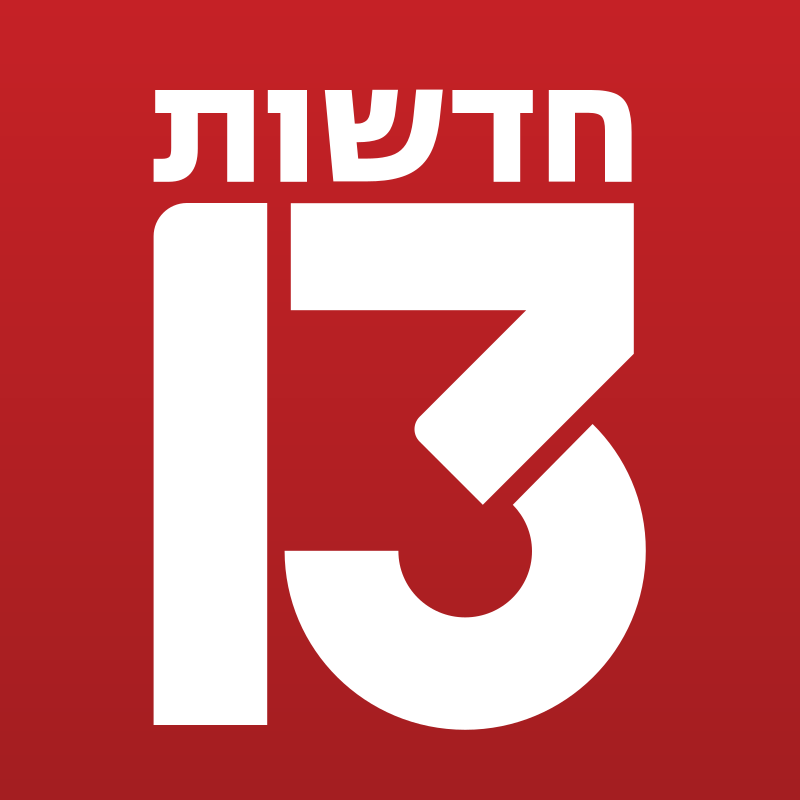
- Native name: חדשות 13
- Romanized name: Hadashot 13
- Formerly: Hadashot 10
- Genre: News; Journalism
- Founded: 23 January 2003; 23 years ago in Givatayim, Israel
- Founder: Ram Landes
- Headquarters: Givatayim, Israel
- Area served: Worldwide
- Key people: Israel Twito (CEO); Ram Landes; Ya'akov Eilon; Tamar Ish-Shalom
- Products: News; Web portals; Video production; Digital media; Documentaries
- Brands: Hamakor; Sheshe; Hakol kalol
- Services: Broadcast; television; Internet
- Owner: Reshet
- Number of employees: 300
- Parent: Reshet 13
- Website: www.13news.co.il

Hadashot 13 (Hebrew: חדשות 13, lit. '[Channel] 13 News') is one of the three major brands of Israeli television news programmes. As the news division of Reshet, it produces news programs for Reshet 13. The company was previously a subsidiary of Channel 10, and produced news programmes under the name of Channel 10 News (Hebrew: חדשות עשר, romanized: Hadashot Eser, lit. '[Channel] Ten News') until the Reshet-Channel 10 merger that took effect on 16 January 2019. The company produces the prime time news bulletin at 8 pm IST, the five news bulletin at 5 pm IST, and all its current affairs programmes for Reshet 13.

On 1 March 2016, Channel 10 News began broadcasting in 16:9 aspect ratio.

== See also ==
- Ya'akov Eilon
- Miki Haimovich
- Tamar Ish-Shalom
- Lior Kenan
- Oshrat Kotler
- Neria Kraus
- Tali Moreno
- Nana 10 (Former official website on "Nana 10" news portal website)
