= Paris-Plages =

Artificial beaches in Paris, France

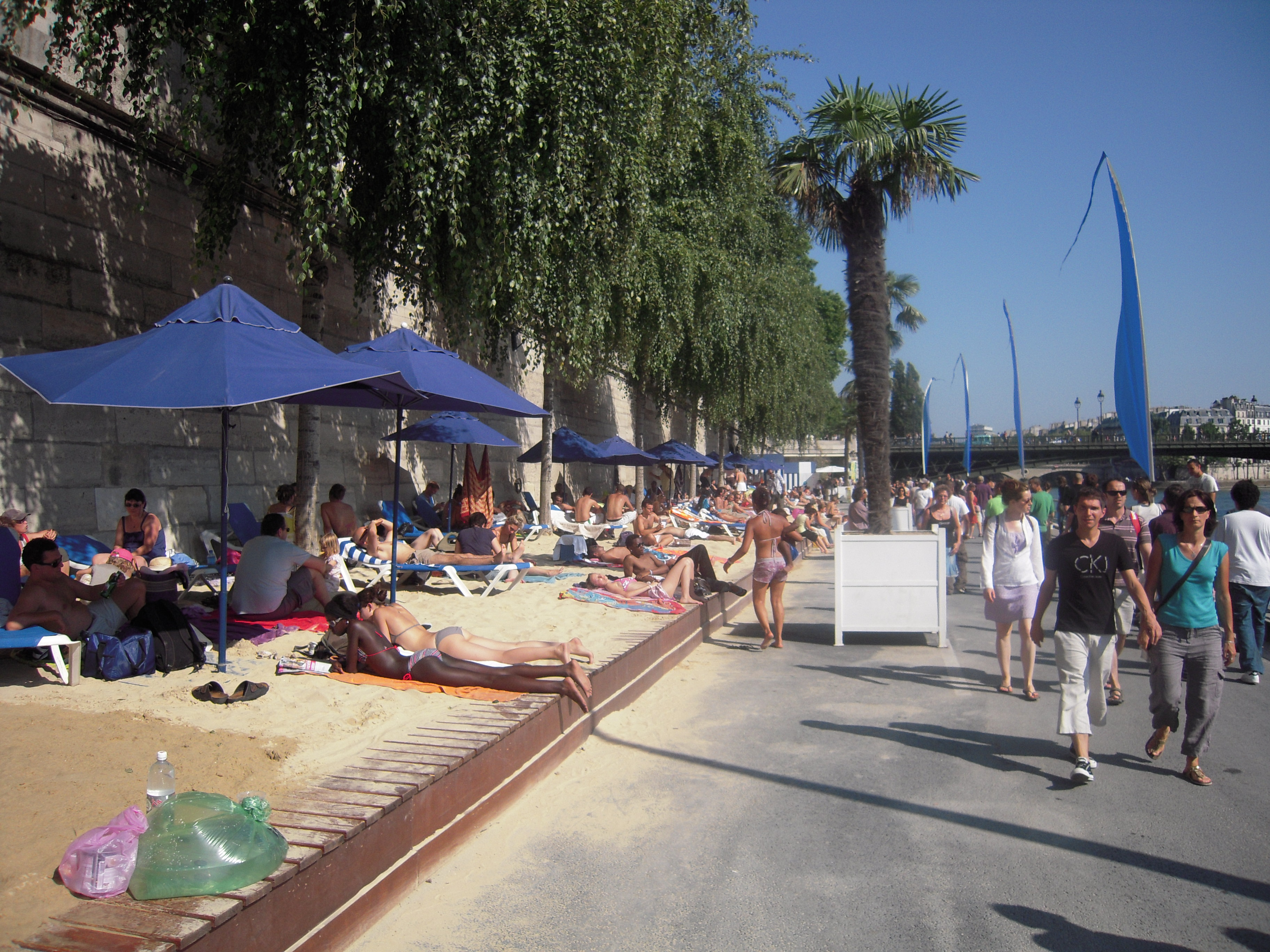
Paris-Plages 2009

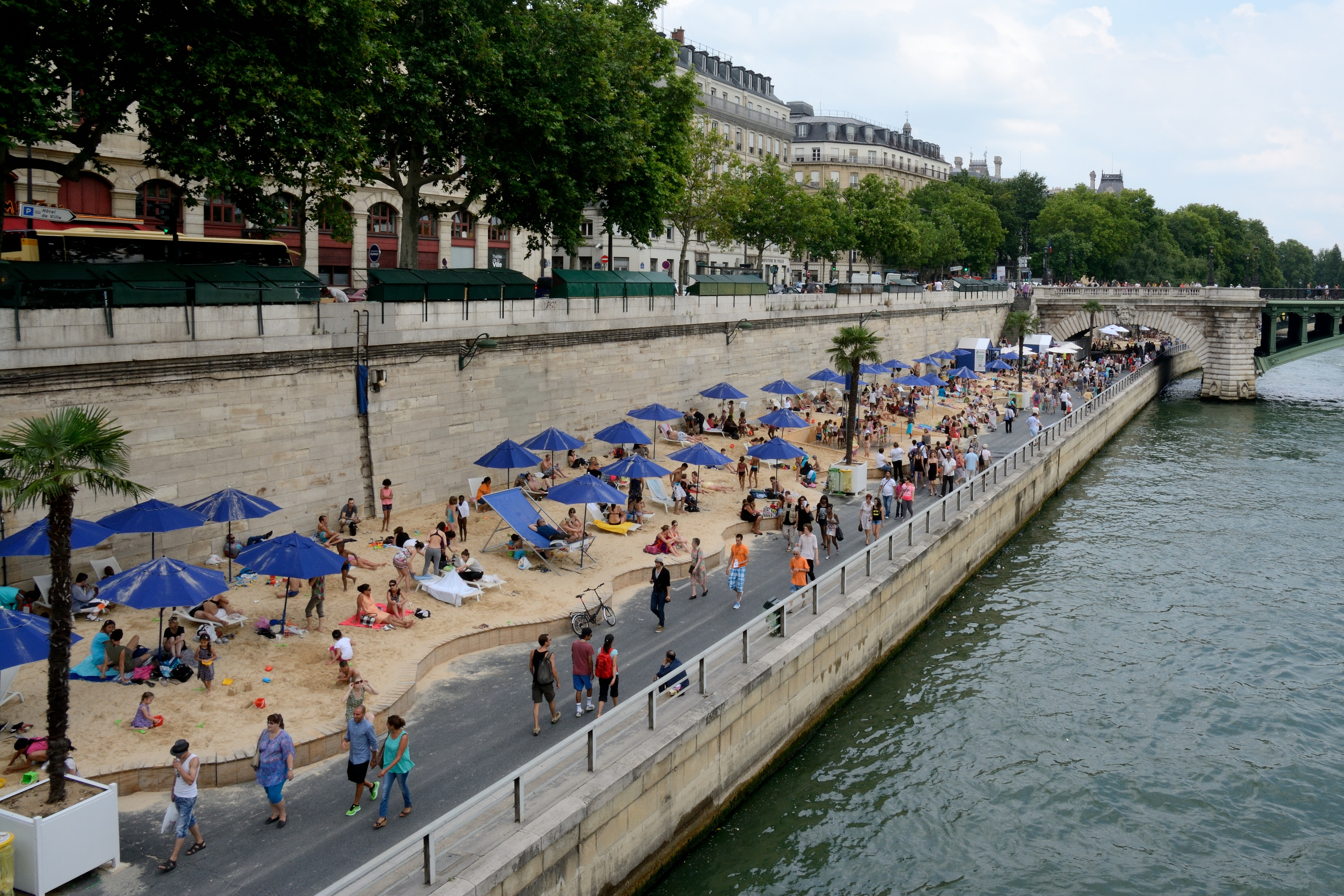
Paris-Plages 2013

Paris-Plages (French pronunciation: [paʁi plaʒ], "Paris Beaches"; until 2006 Paris-Plage in the singular) is a plan run by the office of the mayor of Paris that creates temporary artificial beaches each summer along the river Seine in the centre of Paris, and, since 2007, along the Bassin de la Villette in the northeast of Paris. Every July and August, roadways on the banks of the Seine are closed off and host various activities, including sandy beaches and palm trees.

== History ==
French city-dwellers traditionally escape to the seaside or the countryside during the summer, especially in August. Paris is avoided, as the weather is unpleasantly hot and humid, and the centre has many tourists. Nevertheless, each summer many residents are obliged to remain in the city, however reluctantly. The Paris-Plages scheme was instigated in 2002 by Bertrand Delanoë, the newly elected Socialist Party mayor, as a haven for relieving the misery of those cooped up in the sweltering city.

Initially there was a single beach on the Rive Droite. In 2006, a second beach was added on the Rive Gauche, and the scheme's name changed from singular to plural. Unlike many beaches in France, topless sunbathing is not permitted. Swimming in the Seine was initially prohibited for safety reasons.

The scheme has proven a major success; the number of visitors has grown each year and topped four million in 2007. Every season, new features are added. These include a shuttle ferry linking the two riverbanks, a floating swimming pool, and another beach area at La Villette, in the northeast corner of the city.

The beaches were built free of charge by LafargeHolcim from 2002 to 2017, when the city of Paris discontinued their contract in retaliation for LafargeHolcim's proposal to build the wall on the Mexico–United States border promised by U.S. President Donald Trump.

Following extensive water purification and infrastructure upgrades tied to the legacy of the 2024 Summer Olympics, the Paris-Plages framework expanded to encompass authorized, supervised open-water swimming in natural urban basins. By 2026, the initiative featured five free public swimming sectors, including the existing channels at the Bassin de la Villette, temporary setups at the Canal Saint-Martin, and three designated zones directly within the Seine itself: the Bras Marie (at the Pont Louis-Philippe), the Bras de Grenelle, and the Quai de Bercy.

Swimming areas in the Seine in 2026
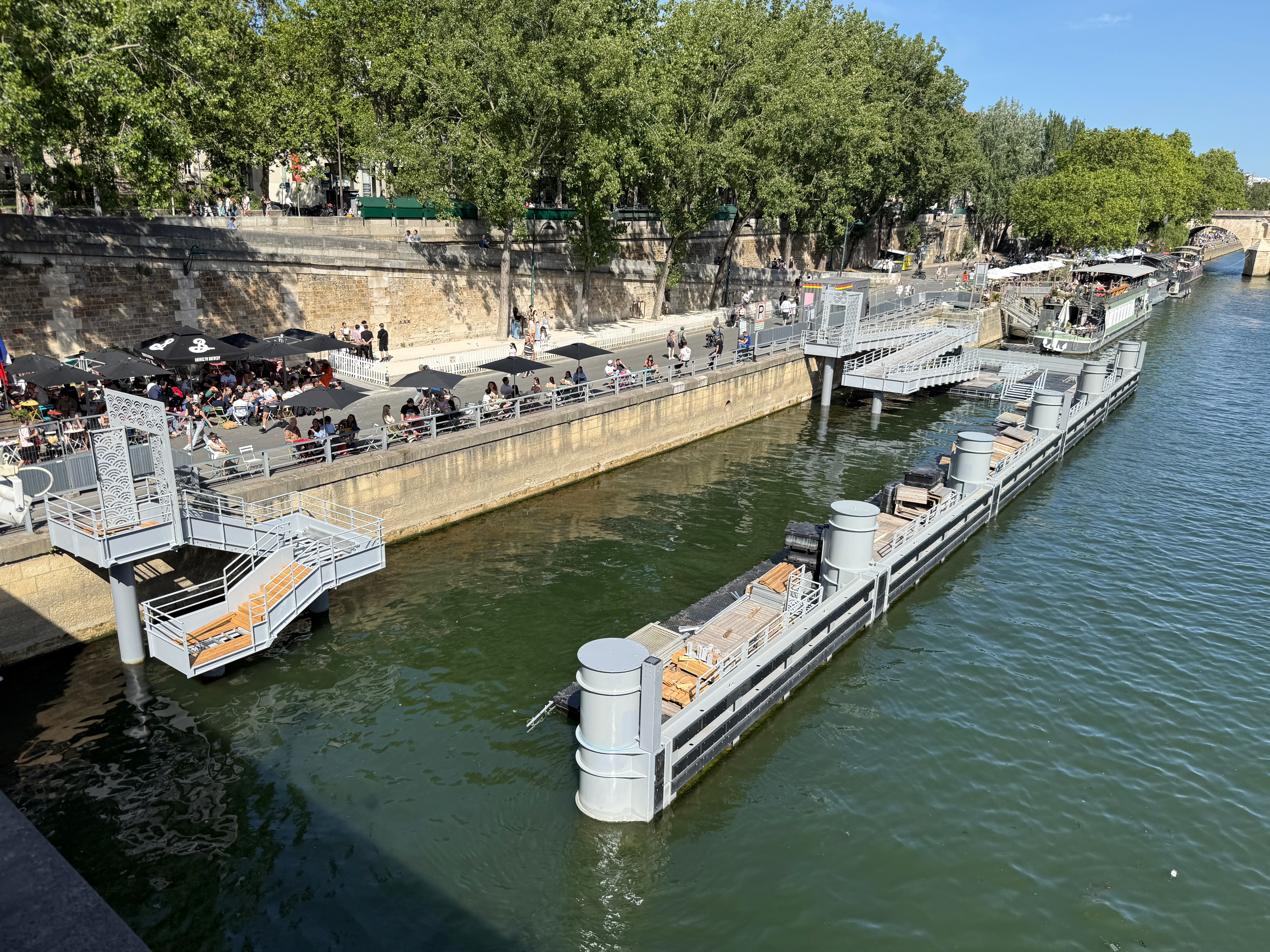
Baignade Bras Marie

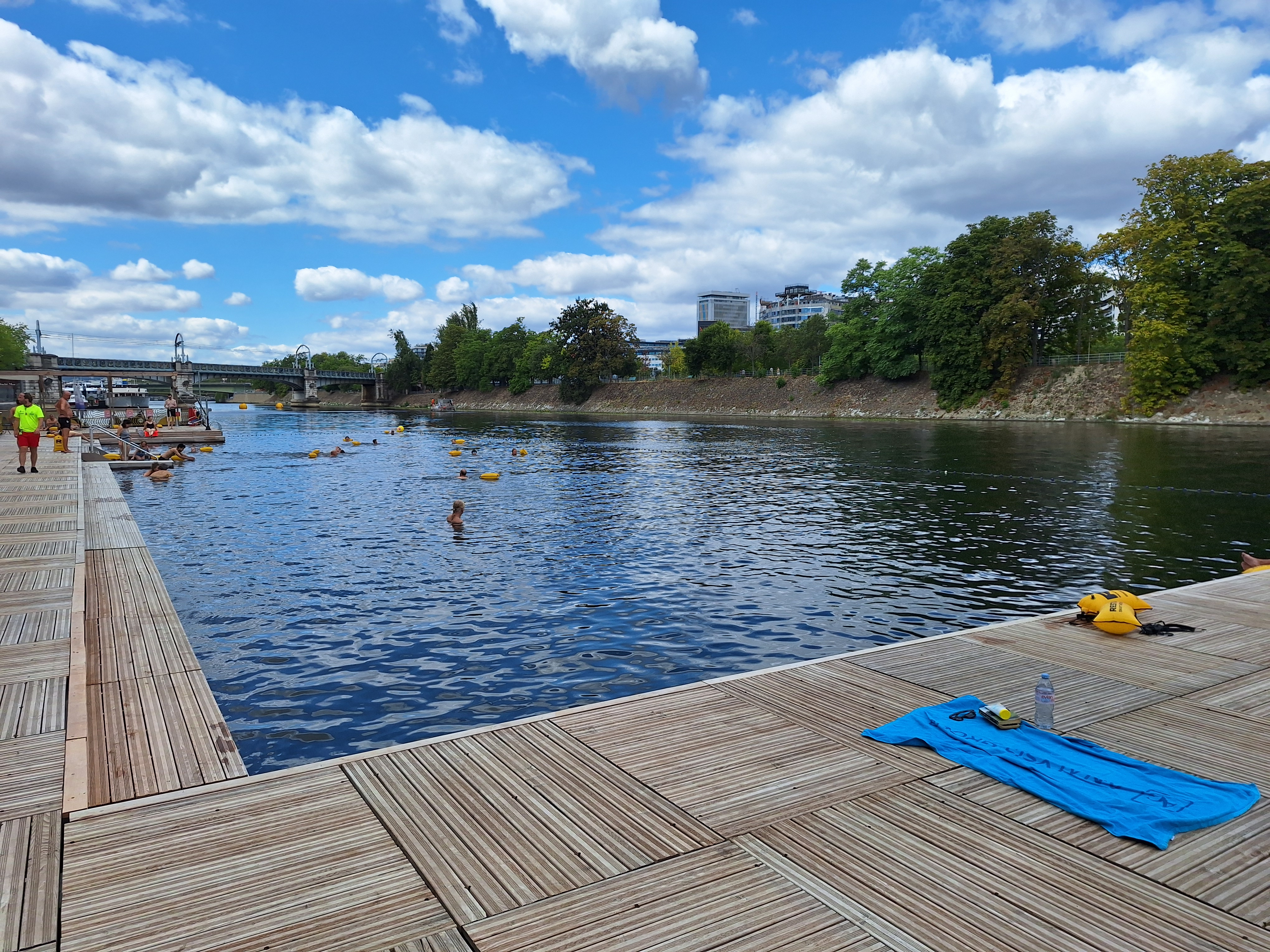
Baignade de Grenelle

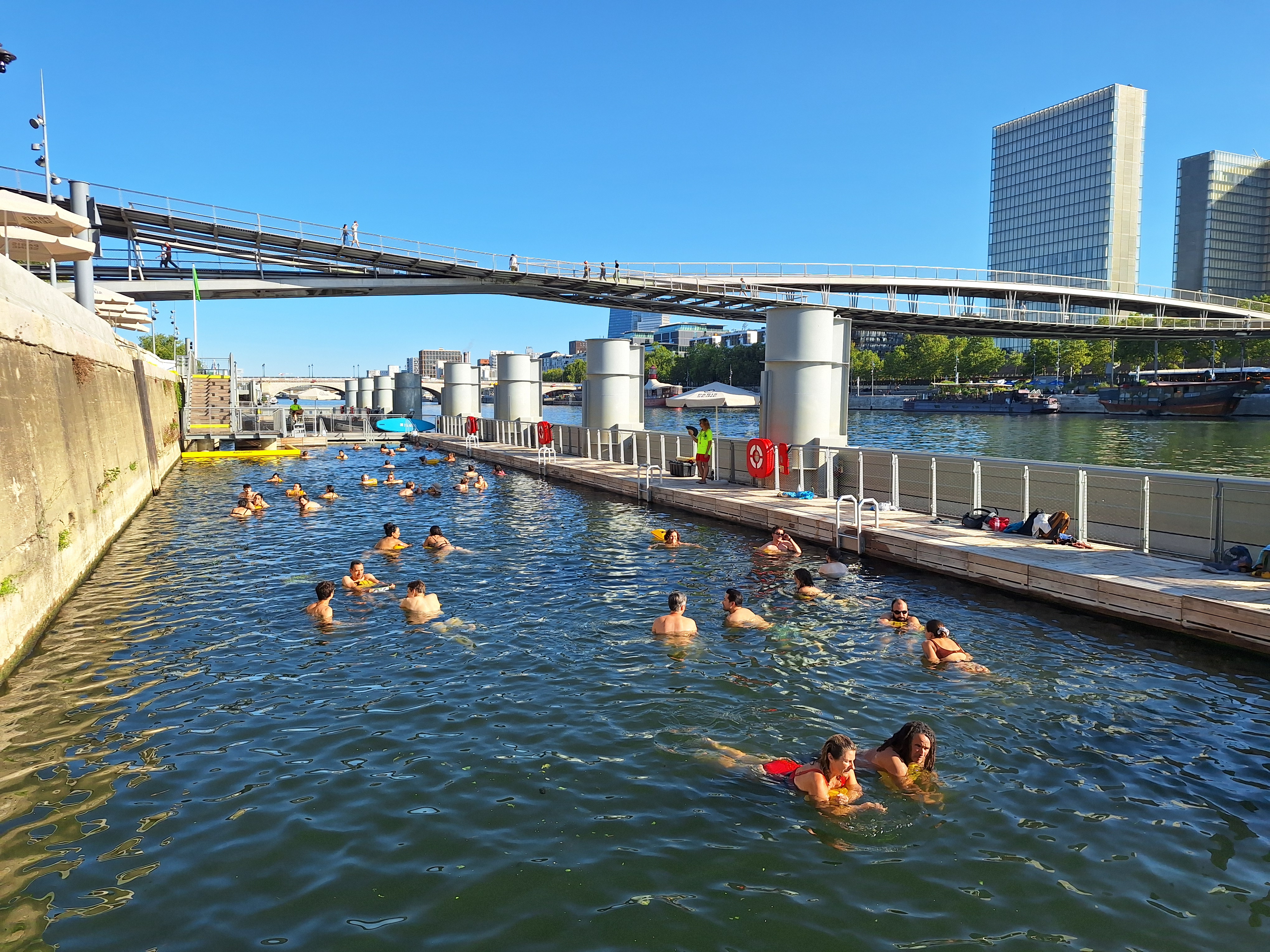
Baignade Bercy

== Le Touquet naming dispute ==
The name "Paris-Plage" was trademarked in 2002. In August 2006, the mayor's office sued the commune of Le Touquet-Paris-Plage for impinging on the trademark by using the phrase "Paris-Plage" in its tourism marketing. This was greeted with scepticism, since the commune's name dated from 1912, based on earlier popular usage. The case was dropped in 2008.
