= Channel 10 (Israel) =

Former Israeli television channel

- Country: Israel

Programming
- Picture format: 576i (SDTV) 16:9 & 4:3

Ownership
- Owner: RGE Media Group

History
- Launched: 28 January 2002; 24 years ago
- Closed: 16 January 2019; 7 years ago
- Replaced by: Channel 13
- Former names: Israel 10

Links
- Website: www.10.tv

Availability

Terrestrial
- Digital terrestrial television: Channel 14

Streaming media
- Nana 10: Live stream

Channel 10 (Hebrew: ערוץ עשר, romanized: Arutz Eser), formerly known as Israel 10 (Hebrew: ישראל 10, romanized: Yisra'el Eser), was an Israeli free-to-air television channel. Operating under the auspices of The Second Authority for Television and Radio, Channel 10 was one of three commercial television channels in Israel (others being Keshet 12 and Reshet 13), enjoying an average audience rating of 6.5% in 2011 within its main news program.

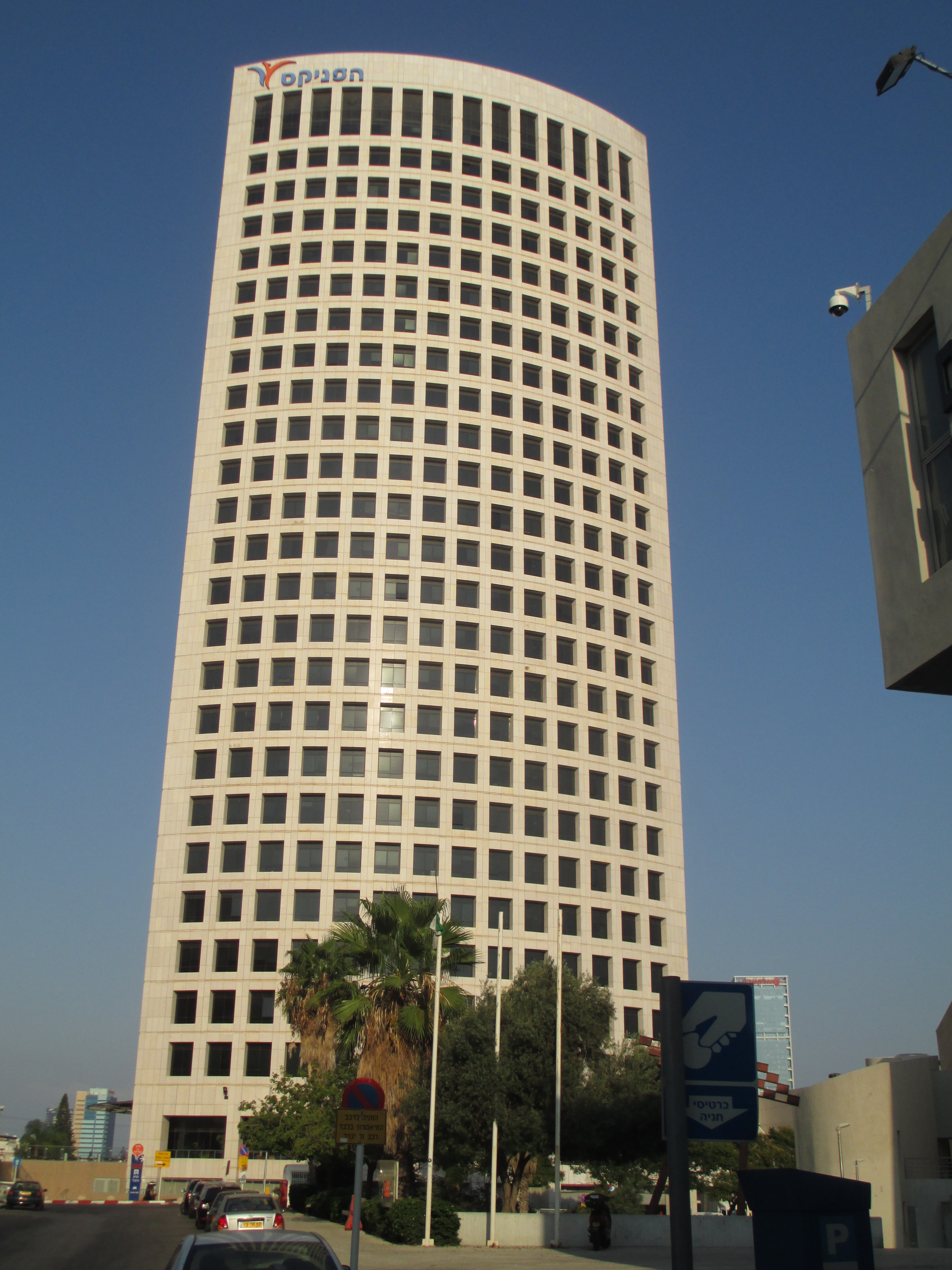
Channel 10 headquarters, Givatayim

Despite the name, the channel was actually broadcast on channel 14 from 1 November 2017 until its closure on 16 January 2019.

Channel 10 underwent a merger with rival network Reshet 13 (of Reshet), and this channel ceased transmissions on 16 January 2019. Some programs from Channel 10 moved over to Reshet 13. For news programmes, the merged company took resources from Channel 10's news production company (which subsequently changed on-air branding to HaHadashot 13), switching from Israel Television News Company. The new channel is mutually owned by some of the channel owners of both networks.

== History ==
Channel 10 began broadcasting on January 28, 2002. The channel offers original drama series, entertainment shows, news shows, lifestyle programs and foreign programs. Initially the channel was going to have two franchisees, Israel 10 and Eden Broadcasting. Due to delays, Eden Broadcasting and Israel 10 merged their license in June 2002. The channel got an own news company in 2003. In 2006, during the Second Lebanon War, Channel 10 News exposed a series of malfunctions in the decision making process leading to the war. Two American presidents have granted Channel 10 exclusive interviews, and during 2011 alone it aired interviews with US Secretary of State Hillary Clinton, UK Foreign Secretary William Hague, Governor Rick Perry, Dennis Ross, French Presidential Candidate Marine Le Pen and others.

In 2011 the Channel encountered financial difficulties and asked the Knesset's finance committee to postpone payment on a tax and royalty debt to the State. The Coalition of Netanyahu's government, in response, ordered all of its MK's to vote against such a postponement. Such tax waivers were regularly given in the past. Israeli and International press published that the Israeli Government has done so in retaliation to an exclusive story published by Channel 10 news, investigating the way in which Netanyahu financed trips abroad, together with his wife. Following that story, the State Comptroller opened a formal investigation and Prime Minister Netanyahu filled a libel suit against the Channel. In late December 2013, it signed a collaboration agreement with China Central Television, enabling the airing of some of its programs on the channel, and in later stages, co-productions and Channel 10 programs on CCTV channels.

From 2013 to 2019, The channel gradually transferred its programs to 16:9 widescreen picture format, which became most of the content's aspect ratio by 2016. On 1 March 2016, the channel's news programs began broadcasting in widescreen as well. A few of the channel's productions and programs still remain in 4:3 aspect ratio, for which the channel switches its broadcast automatically.

== Financial crisis ==
In November 2008, when Channel 10 found itself in severe financial straits, the SBA gave its present owners until March 1, 2009 to refinance its debt. However, in January 2009 the Knesset's Economic Affairs Committee overturned this decision. The decision meant that Channel 10's shareholders, Yossi Maiman, Ronald Lauder and Arnon Milchan, would be replaced as the channel's operators in February 2010. The regular broadcast schedules remained in place until they replaced by the new franchisee. The channel owned a NIS 10 million debt, which the Treasury demanded in cash after agreeing to defer the rest of the channel's NIS 28 million debt.

By July 2009, Channel 10 had cost its shareholders NIS 1.3 billion. It also owed about NIS 103 million more for content, license fees and royalties. The shareholders stated they would not pay the debt. Maiman announced that he and the other partners had no intention of paying any more of the channel's bills, and the channel announced that it was canceling planned productions. In August, the channel's directors undertook to invest NIS 19 million in television content, NIS 4 million more than their previous offer. They also agreed to invest more of the money for dramatic productions. Artist guild representatives said that they would petition the Israeli High Court of Justice if the agreement did not take them into account. In September, the SBA suspended its search for a new franchisee pending the approval of the Treasury and the Communications Ministry. The controversy over a profile of US American businessman Sheldon Adelson broadcast by Channel 10 risked the withdrawal of financing from Ronald Lauder, the last major funder left at that date. Until the end of 2011 the fate of the channel remained unknown. In mid January 2012, the channel was given another year to regulate its financial obligations. In December 2014, the channel was days away from closing down. On the night of 27/28 December 2014, the station ceased regular broadcasting, showing instead a picture of Benjamin Netanyahu and the message "In three days, Channel 10 will close. prime minister, Benjamin Netanyahu, who serves as the ministry of communications, refuses to find a solution." In January 2015, the station was allowed to function without a new permanent license for another six months, under the authority of the Attorney General. A permanent decision was postponed until after the Knesset elections scheduled for March 17 and the formation of a new government. A major reason quoted for the move was ensuring the expression of a wide range of political opinions on TV during the election campaign.

In May 2015, the RGE Media Group of Leonard Blavatnik, Aviv Giladi and Udi Recanati acquired 51% of Channel 10. A month after, the station got a 15-year license from the Second Television and Radio Authority Council.

In June 2018, due to financial issues caused by the 2017 Channel 2 split, RGE filed a merger with Reshet's Channel 13. As a part of the merger plan, Channel 10 News (RGE's news company) was to become a part of Channel 13, and some programs from Channel 10 would join Reshet 13. This channel would stop broadcasting, and more than 100 employees would be eliminated if the merger goes through. In October 2018, Reshet announced that the merger was cancelled. Reshet's owners have since reconsidered the merger, and after a long battle with the Second Authority, the merger was approved, and was scheduled for 16 January 2019.

== Original productions ==
Former logo

=== Shows about current affairs ===
- Hayom Shehaya (The Day That Was) – late night current events program.
- London et Kirschenbaum – current affairs news show.
- Economy at night - a show about current economic events. the show was aired during 2009-2017.

=== Investigative shows ===
- Kolbotek - a veteran Israeli consumer affairs and investigative reporting TV show on Channel 2.

=== Reality shows ===
- Hisardut (Survivor) – Reality game show. (Moved to the now-defunct Channel 2, currently airing on channel Reshet 13)
- Baby Boom (Israeli TV series) - an Israeli television series that debuted in 2014 on Channel 10.
- The winning couple VIP - an Israeli reality television series that aired in 2014-2017 on Channel 10.
- The Search - a reality TV show. each episode centered on a person looking for a man that had a major part in his life, in order to show graduated, ask for forgiveness and get closer.
- The Biggest Loser - the show focuses on over wight participants competing on losing the most wight.
- HaDugmaniot – (The Models) reality documentary series.
- Me'usharot (From Riches) Reality TV docusoap based on the Real Housewives franchise.

=== Interview shows ===
- Intimate - an Interview show, by Rafi reshef, that aired in 2015-2019.

=== Drama shows ===
- Hostages – drama series.
- Achat Efes Efes (One Zero Zero) – Action drama series.

=== Game shows ===
- La'uf al HaMillion (Go For The Million) – Game Show.
- HaChulia HaChalasha (The Weakest Link) – Game Show.

=== Comedy shows ===
- Naor's Friends – comedy featuring comedian Naor Zion.
- Gav Ha'Uma – satire show hosted by Lior Schleien.

=== Action shows ===
In addition to these shows, 10 also produced and broadcast the Israeli versions of the quizzes The Weakest Link, Who Wants to Be a Millionaire?, Deal or No Deal, and Jeopardy!, the reality shows The Biggest Loser, Beauty and the Geek, The Bachelor and the comedy improvisation show Whose Line is it Anyway?. It also broadcast Krav Sakinim ("Knife Fight"), a local adaptation of the Japanese cooking competition show Iron Chef. Every Night with Assaf Harel was a late night talk show on Channel 10. In mid 2013, the Israeli version of Extreme Makeover: Home Edition began airing on this channel, hosted by Amos Tamam.

== Controversies ==
=== Knesset security breach ===
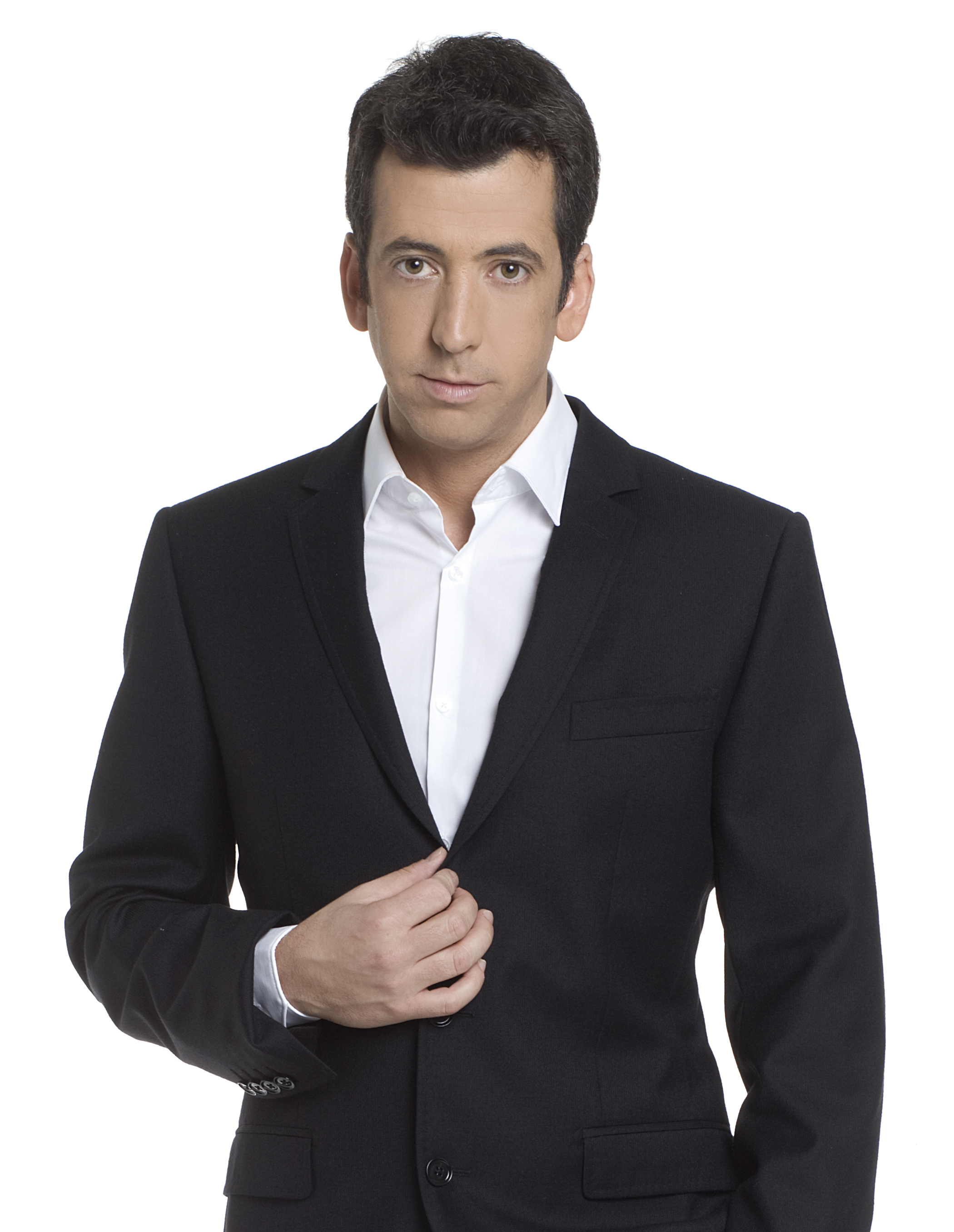
Guy Lerer, Channel 10 host

In June 2013, an investigative report by the news program Tzinor Laila (English: Nightline) aired on Channel 10 in which journalists described a type of 'plastic gun', showing how all its parts can be 3D printed and assembled, and the program's journalists managed to smuggle the weapon twice into the Knesset. First, they managed to bring it into the offices of Miri Regev. Second, reporter Uri Even carried the weapon into an event in the Knesset compound attended by Prime Minister Benjamin Netanyahu. The reporters passed all related security checks, including metal detector scans, and got only a few feet away from Netanyahu.

Though the expose was created for the purposes of raising awareness and the firearm (a Liberator model handgun) was never actually filled with bullets, a public controversy ensued. The Prime Minister's official office issued a statement reading that "the way of action shown in the report is known to security personnel" and that "several other security arrangements, both visible and hidden, exist." The statement also argued that Channel 10's "act was irresponsible and could have endangered the perpetrators of the questionable 'journalistic mission' and cause them severe damage."

=== Other controversies ===
In 2009, The Vatican complained to the Israeli government about a TV clip aired on Channel 10 that allegedly blasphemed Jesus and Mary. On a show hosted by Lior Shlein, a clip was shown where Mary was said to have become pregnant at 15 by a schoolmate and the idea of Jesus walking on water was dismissed because "he was so fat he was ashamed to leave the house, let alone go to the Sea of Galilee with a bathing suit." Israel said the broadcaster would publicly apologize.

In another incident in 2009, a reality show contestant called his shoe "Mohammed", sparking an angry response from local Muslims. In a clip, one of the contestants referred to his shoes as "Nasrin" and "Mohammed." Nasrin, a Palestinian from Haifa who was voted off the show early, had clashed with him.

== See also ==
- HaHadashot 13
- Television in Israel
- Culture of Israel
