= Jews in punk rock =

Overview of the relationship between Jews and punk rock

There exists a long-standing and well-documented relationship between Jews and punk rock. This includes multiple prominent Jewish musicians, promoters, and label executives who were involved in the development of punk in the 1970s and 1980s, the continued presence of prominent Jewish artists and personalities in the genre in the modern era, a small but noteworthy punk rock scene in Israel, and a more recent loose proto-scene of explicitly Jewish-themed punk bands and artists. In Steven Lee Beeber's "The Heebie-Jeebies at CBGB's: A Secret History of Jewish Punk," the author posits that punk was largely an outgrowth of Jewish culture, with ironic comedy, glorification of the underdog and the trauma of the Holocaust being pivotal influences.

== Jewish musicians in mainstream punk ==
"Joey Ramone ate matzah at the seder
Just like Richard Hell and most of The Dictators"

— Lyrics to Yidcore's "Punk Rock Chanukah Song",
a parody of Adam Sandler's "The Chanukah Song"
focused on Jewish punk musicians.

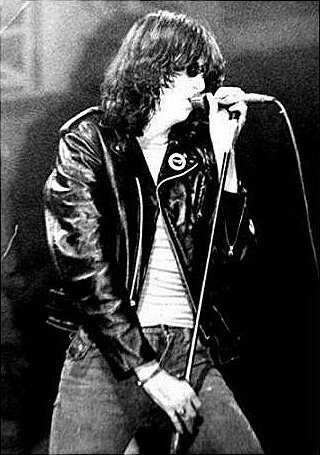
Joey Ramone (born Jeffrey Ross Hyman), lead singer of the Ramones

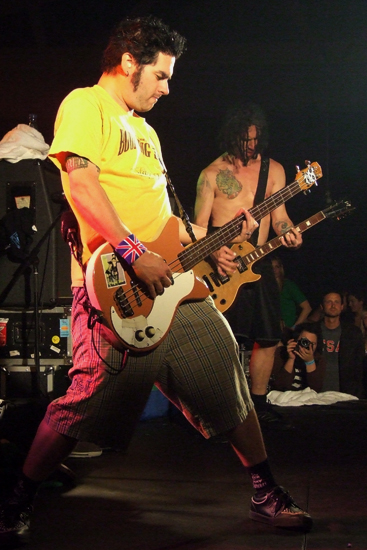
"Fat Mike" Burkett, lead singer and bassist of NOFX

As early as the 1970s, musicians of Jewish descent played a prominent role in the development of punk rock, particularly in the New York scene. A notable example was proto-punk band The Dictators, whose members Ross "The Boss" Friedman, Andy Shernoff, "Handsome Dick" Manitoba (born Richard Blum), and Mark "The Animal" Mendoza (born Mark Glickman) were Jewish. Similarly, Lou Reed, Richard Hell, the New York Dolls' Sylvain Sylvain, Alan Vega and Martin Rev of Suicide and Joey and Tommy Ramone of the Ramones were also of Jewish descent. Hillel "Hilly" Kristal founded the club CBGB, which became a prominent venue for punk bands. The Jewish members of New York rap rock group The Beastie Boys began as a hardcore punk band and continued to incorporate punk elements into their music throughout their career. In 2009, Manitoba, Tommy Ramone, Patti Smith guitarist Lenny Kaye, and Chris Stein of Blondie hosted a panel at the YIVO Institute for Jewish Research called "Loud, Fast Jews", discussing the Jewish contribution to punk. In Los Angeles, Jewish figures including Keith Morris of Black Flag and Circle Jerks, Dpunk photographer Jenny Lens, Stan Lee of The Dickies, members of Backstage Pass, and Gwynne Kahn of The Pandoras were part of the scene during this time.

In the United Kingdom, the Sex Pistols were shaped by Jewish manager Malcolm McLaren. The Clash's Mick Jones and Joe Strummer were both of Jewish descent, as was their manager Bernard Rhodes; early Clash guitarist Keith Levene was also Jewish. Wayne Barrett, the frontman of Slaughter and the Dogs, Culture Club drummer Jon Moss and Rough Trade Records founder Geoff Travis were all brought up Jewish. (Moss was adopted by a Jewish couple as an infant.)

Jews were also present in the California punk scene of the early 1980s, such as Bad Religion's Brett Gurewitz and Greg Hetson, NOFX's Fat Mike and Eric Melvin, Aaron Cometbus of Crimpshrine, and Operation Ivy's Jesse Michaels and Dave Mello. Henry Rollins, frontman of Black Flag and Rollins Band, is of Jewish descent through his father, though he was unaware of this fact until years later. In the 21st century, notable Jewish punk musicians have included Fall Out Boy's Joe Trohman and Steve Klein, Say Anything's Max Bemis, and Sleater-Kinney's Carrie Brownstein and Janet Weiss. California punk band Shiragirl, led by Jewish singer Shira Yevin, became known in the 2000s for creating the Warped Tour's Shiragirl Stage, which hosted female artists at the festival; both veterans like Joan Jett and then-newer acts like Paramore performed on the stage.

== Israeli punk rock ==
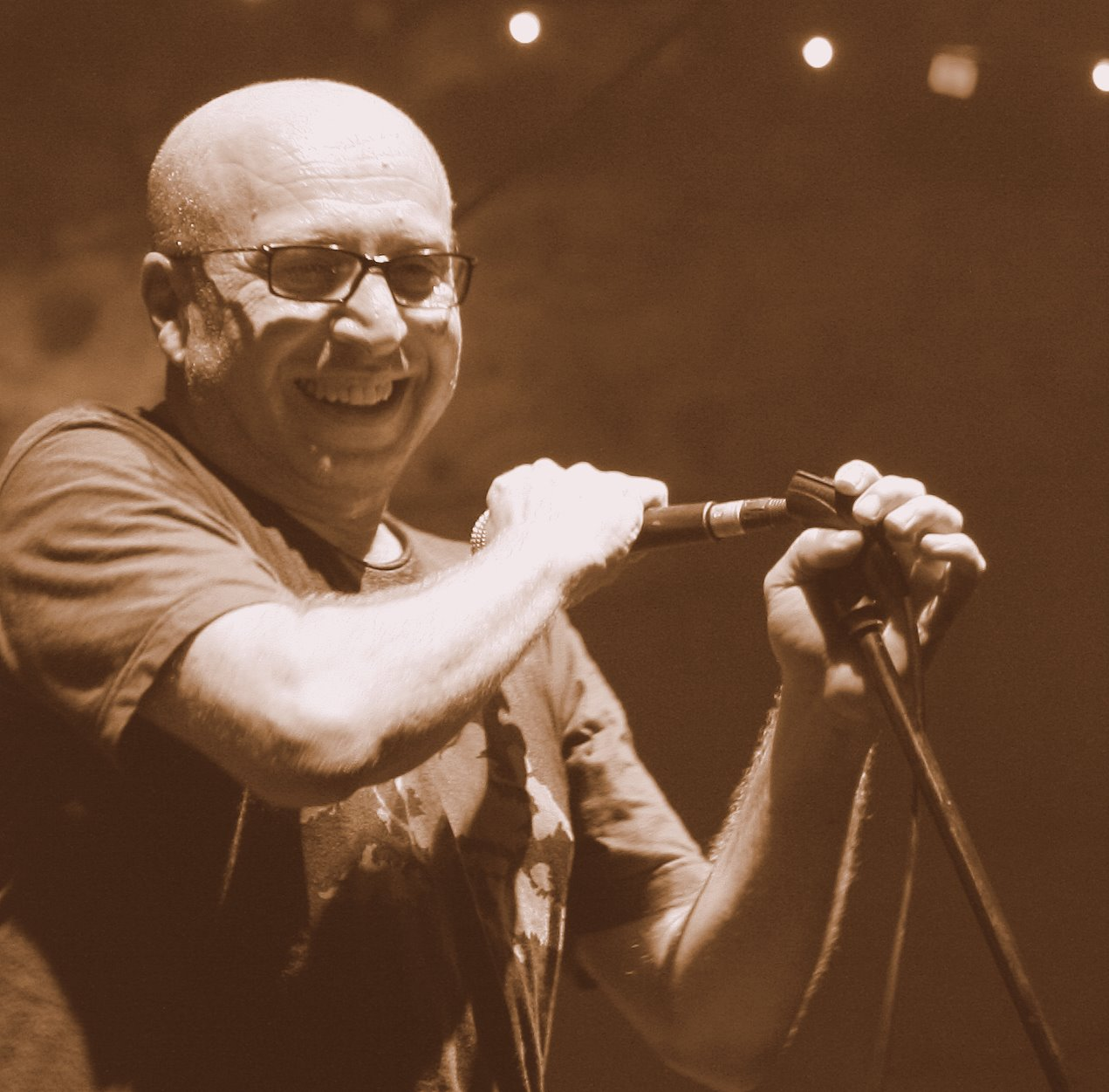
Rami Fortis' 1978 album Plonter is widely considered the origin of Israeli punk rock.

Punk and its subgenres have been present in the wider Israeli rock scene to various degrees since the late 1970s. For his 1978 debut album Plonter, Israeli rock musician Rami Fortis drew on a punk rock sound influenced by The Clash, Sex Pistols, Iggy Pop, and Ramones that was uncommon in Israel at the time; while the album was not a commercial success upon release, it has since been regarded as an influential cult album and Fortis himself as a pioneer of Israeli punk rock. The band Cholera, formed in Jerusalem in 1982, is generally considered to be one of the country's first punk bands.

In the 1980s and early 1990s, many of Israel's prominent alternative rock acts drew from punk, new wave and post-punk, including artists like HaClique, Mashina, Minimal Compact, Berry Sakharof, and Aviv Geffen. Additionally during this time, the band Zikney Tzfat on their 1992 debut album exhibited a grunge/noise punk sound influenced by Killdozer and Butthole Surfers, while Shabak Samech performed a punk-inflected hip hop sound similar to the Beastie Boys and Rage Against the Machine.

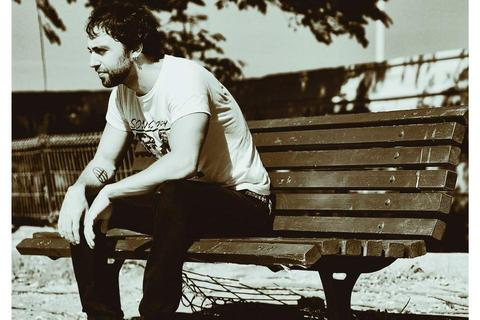
Useless ID, led by Yotam Ben Horin (pictured), are one of the longest-running and most internationally successful Israeli punk bands.

A small but tight-knit Israeli punk scene emerged between 1992 and 1996 in Tel Aviv, Haifa, and Jerusalem. The most successful of the scene was Useless ID, who gained international attention in 1999 after recording a split album with The Ataris for Kung Fu Records, a song from which was featured on the Fat Wreck Chords compilation Short Music for Short People.

Another prominent band in the scene was Nekhei Na'atza, an anarcho-punk band formed in 1990 by Argentina-born brothers Federico and Santiago Gomez, who had grown up on the Lehavot HaBashan kibbutz in northern Israel. Known for their left-wing and anti-Zionist politics, they released two albums, 1994's Renounce Judaism and 1997's Hail The New Regime, and played multiple shows with Useless ID in Tel Aviv and Haifa. They were also the first Israeli punk band to tour the United States, and Federico Gomez later asserted that they were "the first [Israeli band] to become actively engaged in the international DIY hardcore punk scene." After Nekhei Na'atza disbanded in 1997, Federico Gomez helped form Deir Yassin, another anarcho-punk band with similar politics named for the infamous Deir Yassin massacre, which released several albums and toured throughout Europe before disbanding in 2003. Other bands in this period included Kuku Blof and the Mosquitoes and Breast Cancer. A number of initially teenaged bands broke up as members were drafted into the military.

Israeli punk saw a resurgence in the 2000s, with bands including Man Alive, the ska punk band Beer7 (one of the few female-fronted bands in the scene), the pop punk/skate punk band Kill the Drive, and the metalcore band Betzefer. In 2008, American filmmaker Liz Nord premiered her documentary on the scene, Jericho's Echo: Punk Rock in the Holy Land, at the Docaviv film festival; the film interviews bands including Useless ID, Man Alive, Dead Rabinz, Chaos Rabak, Nikmat Olalim, Va'adat Kishut, HaPussy Shel Lussy, and Retribution (one of the rare openly Zionist bands in the scene) and examines various ideological conflicts within the scene and the country as a whole. That same year, American indie label Drag City signed Israeli garage/noise punk band Monotonix and released their debut EP Body Language.

Israeli punk artists in the 2010s included The White Screen, performing a throwback '80s glam punk sound, and Deaf Chonky, a garage punk band incorporating Russian folk influences.

=== Ideology and politics ===
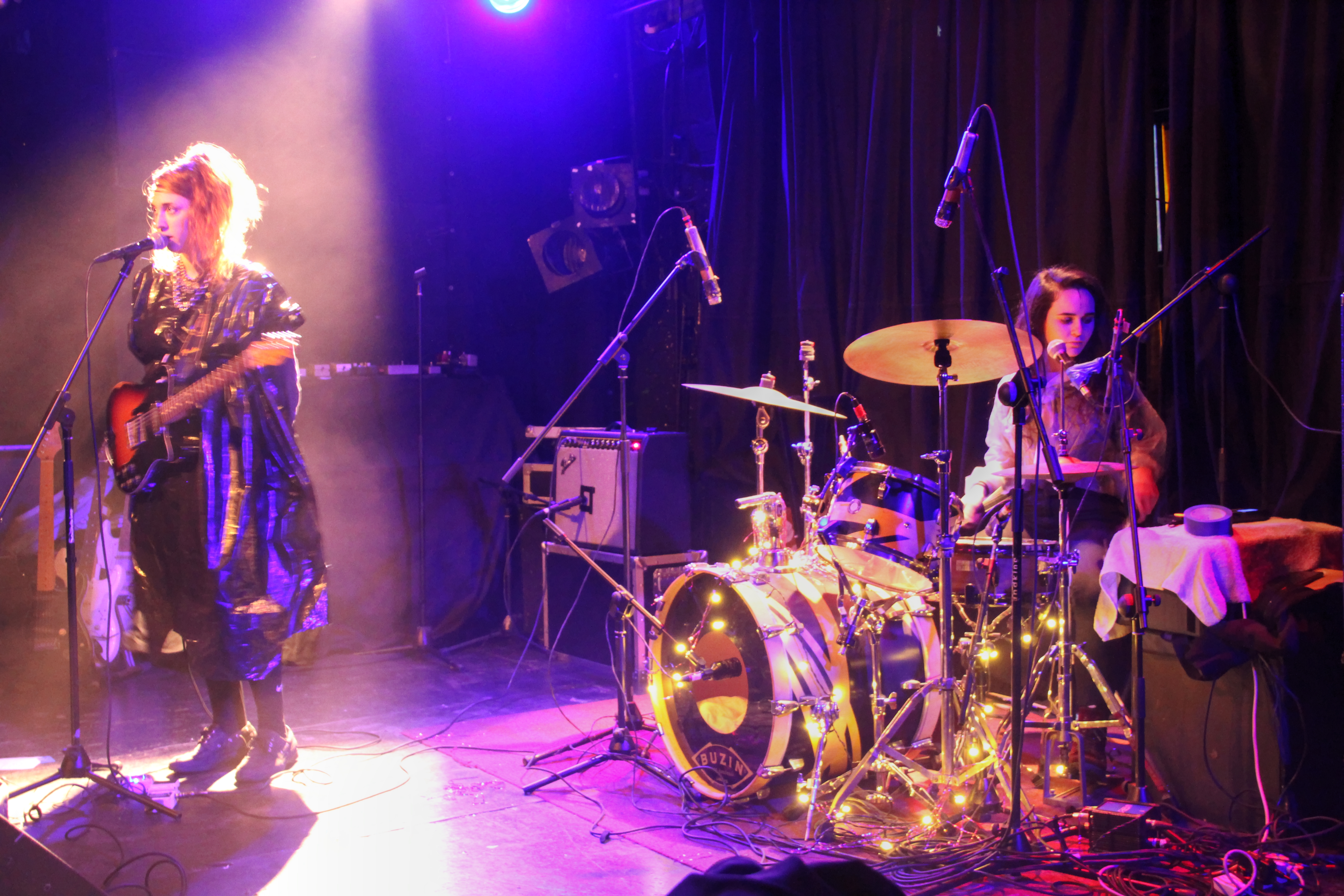
Deaf Chonky's music combines garage punk with Russian folk influences.

Key issues within the Israeli punk scene have included anarchism/socialism, pacifism, animal rights, Jewish identity, the Israeli military and its draft, and the broader Israeli–Palestinian conflict. A number of artists opposed and even avoided the draft; Useless ID's Ishay Berger was investigated in the late 1990s for writing an article in his fanzine advising young punks on how to avoid the draft.

On the topic of the Israel-Palestine conflict, the scene, like much of Israeli society, has been divided; while most bands in the 1990s were left-wing and sympathetic to the Palestinian cause, few were openly anti-Zionist and even fewer were critical of Judaism and the Israeli state, with Nekhei Na'atza representing the more radical left end of the scene with their opposition to religion and Zionism, and Retribution being perhaps the only explicitly nationalist band in the scene. HaPussy Shel Lussy lost their lead singer, Omri Goldin, in a terrorist attack, yet reiterated their support for Palestinians. Man Alive are outspoken pacifists, while Useless ID expanded their focus to address international politics, such as appearing on the anti-war compilation Rock Against Bush, Vol. 2. More recently, the lyrics of Deaf Chonky address feminism, environmentalism, militarism, and racism within Israeli society; their song "Silence is Violence" ends with the lyric: "Silence is violence/Fuck Zionist violence".

== Jewish-themed punk artists ==
=== 1980s to 1990s ===
While earlier punk musicians occasionally emphasized their Jewish identity, beginning in the 1980s, a number of explicitly Jewish-themed punk bands and artists began to emerge. Sociologist Keith Kahn-Harris described this collection of artists as a "proto-scene", having the constituent parts in the form of individual artists but not ultimately forming a coherent scene. Author and journalist Michael Croland similarly noted that "there was no global Jewish scene or subgenre because most of these bands were operating as part of [their] local punk scene[s]...Because these bands operated in different places over different points of time… one act's idea might be very similar to another one's, but they didn't inspire each other."

According to Croland, the earliest example of such a band was the short-lived punk band Jews From The Valley, formed in Los Angeles in 1981 by musician Mark Hecht. Their music incorporated well-known Jewish songs like "Hava Nagila", original songs with Jewish themes, and a highly provocative Jewish sense of humor; in one particular confrontation, the band performed a punk cover of "Springtime for Hitler" from Mel Brooks' The Producers during a concert at Fairfax High School, resulting in their sound being cut off mid-performance and the band being dismissed without pay.

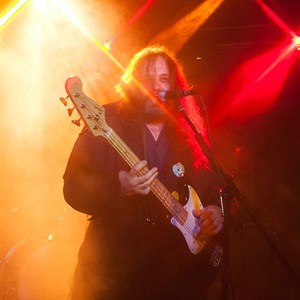
Steve Lieberman, also known as the "Gangsta Rabbi".

While there remained no cohesive Jewish punk scene, the 1990s marked the first time that multiple Jewish punk bands came into existence simultaneously. In the early 1990s, Hecht formed a similarly-themed hardcore punk band, Gefilte Fuck, with vocalist Howard Hallis. Although equally short-lived and only recording five songs between 1992 and 1993, Gefilte Fuck gained notoriety for their live performances, during which they would wear kippot and tallitot onstage, start hora dances in the mosh pit, drink Manischewitz wine, and throw matzo, Hanukkah gelt, and chunks of gefilte fish at audiences; Hallis, an art student at UCLA at the time, was inspired by the food-based performance art he'd been studying, and the group's antics were later likened to a tamer version of GG Allin. This combination of covering familiar Jewish songs, irreverent humor, and raucous food-based performances was echoed later in the decade by two other groups, the Oakland, California-based Jewdriver (which formed in 1994 as a parody of the white supremacist punk band Skrewdriver and featured Dave Mello of Operation Ivy as a member) and the Australian band Yidcore, formed in Melbourne in 1998 by frontman Bram Presser; both bands gave a notorious concert at the 924 Gilman Street venue during Hanukkah of 2006, wherein fans were encouraged to pelt both bands with bagels. Yidcore in particular saw considerable success in America for a Jewish punk band, sharing the stage with NOFX and Useless ID, attracting substantial coverage from the American Jewish press, and gaining a following in Jewish high schools and summer camps via bootlegs of their albums being passed around.

Additionally, in a 2014 article, HuffPost contributor Michael Lee Nirenberg recalled seeing a Hasidic band called The Mohels in 1993 in New Jersey, describing their sound as "heavy" and akin to hardcore bands like Discharge, Flipper, and Melvins. Per Nirenberg's memory and research, the band formed in Williamsburg, Brooklyn but avoided playing in New York for fear of being discovered by the Hasidic community, had a lead singer who went by Mickey Mohel, and recorded an eight-song cassette tape with titles including "I Sat Shivah" and "Ki Lo Yitosh".

Elsewhere that decade, outsider garage/art punk musician Steve "Gangsta Rabbi" Lieberman began releasing music in 1991 and developed an underground following, while Glassjaw members Justin Beck and Todd Weinstock formed a short-lived Jewish metalcore band called Sons of Abraham that released an album in 1997.

=== 2000s and 2010s ===
The Shondes performing in 2010

The 2000s saw several Jewish- and punk-derived artists emerge and gain notoriety to varying degrees. Golem, a New York-based klezmer punk collective, received media coverage in 2005 for performing a Catskills-inspired mock Jewish wedding at the Knitting Factory venue in New York City. Jewish musician and activist Nomy Lamm, a figure in the riot grrl and queercore communities of Olympia, Washington since the 1990s, released her 2002 album Effigy on Yoyo Recordings, contributed music to the 2006 documentary Young, Jewish, and Left, and was featured on Olympia rapper Eprhyme's 2008 single "Punklezmerap". Orthodox rabbi and anti-folk artist Rav Shmuel received positive attention for his 2006 album Protocols; Stewart Mason of AllMusic compared him to Adam Green of The Moldy Peaches and calling the album "an immediately likable bit of good-humored anti-folk that doesn't require the visuals -- or even the knowledge that, yes, Rav Shmuel really is a Hasidic rabbi -- to get across."

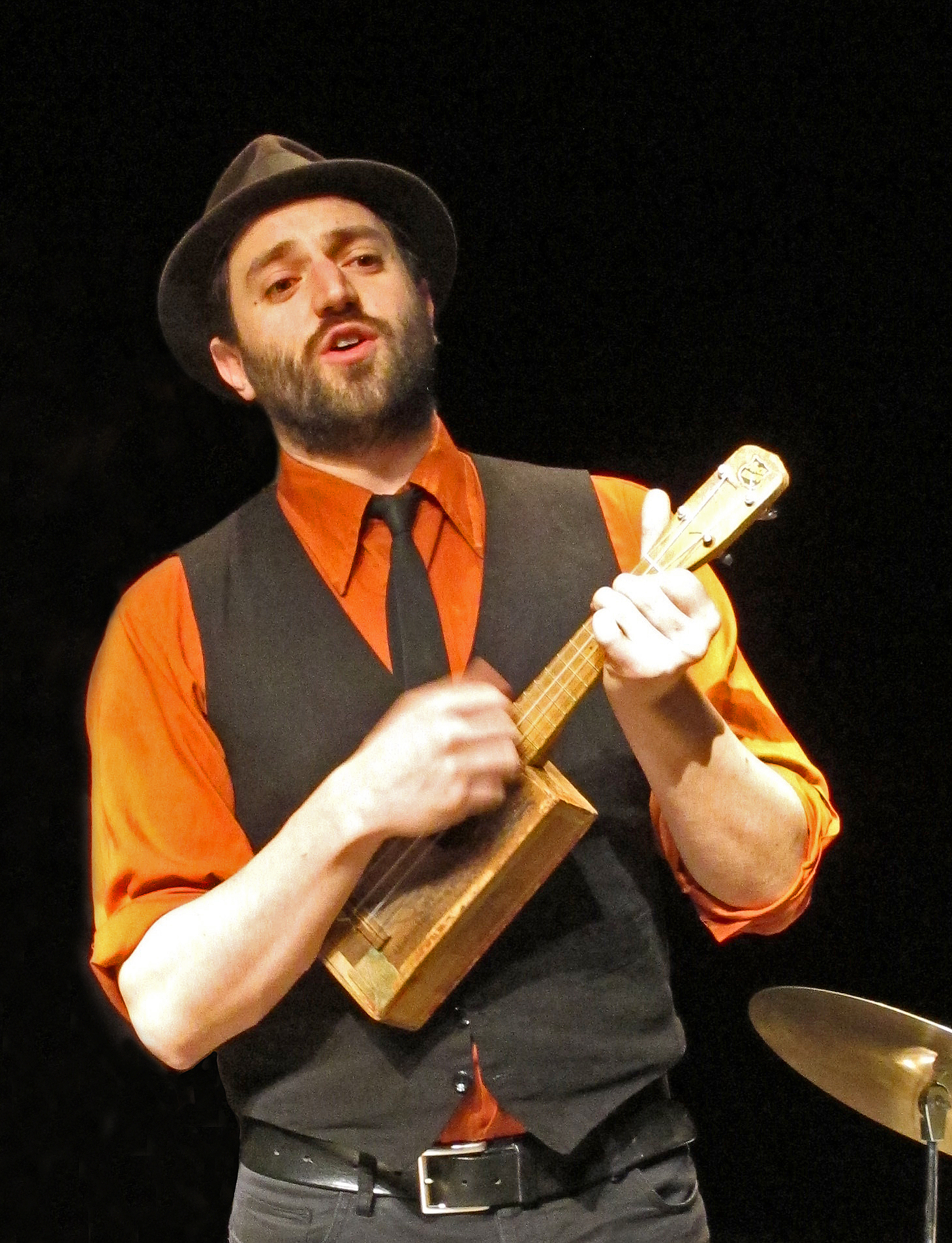
Daniel Kahn of Daniel Kahn & the Painted Bird

The Shondes, a New York-based Jewish riot grrl punk band who became known for their feminist and anti-Zionist views, found critical success in 2008 with their debut album The Red Sea. Can Can, an Atlanta-based art punk/grunge band led by Patrick Aleph, incorporated references to Aleph's Jewish faith into the lyrics of their 2009 debut album All Hell, and subsequently signed to JDub Records for their 2010 follow-up Monsters & Healers. German-based Yiddishist klezmer punk group Daniel Kahn & the Painted Bird also debuted in 2009 with the album Partisans & Parasites, gaining a following in both Europe and the United States. Breslov Hasidic hardcore punk band Moshiach Oi! received media attention and critical acclaim on the back of their 2009 debut album Better Get Ready, and were later featured prominently in the 2012 documentary Punk Jews.

The early 2010s saw a return of humor-driven Jewish punk. Pop punk band The Groggers, debuting with the viral single "Get" and the subsequent album There's No 'I' in Cherem, gained notoriety for their satirical songs about New York Modern Orthodox Jewish life and even garnered controversy for their 2012 single "Jewcan Sam" and its depiction of lead singer L.E. Doug Staiman's rhinoplasty. Shortly afterward, the all-transgender queercore/folk punk band Schmekel garnered attention with their humorous lyrics (likened to Frank Zappa, Tom Lehrer, and Pansy Division) about the struggles of being a Jewish trans man. In a more serious vein, the Chabad duo Bulletproof Stockings gained attention for both their alternative rock/post-punk sound and their decision to perform for exclusively female-only audiences in accordance with Orthodox laws of tzniut, including a prominent 2014 show at Arlene's Grocery in Manhattan that was filmed for the Oxygen network.

== Jewish punk artists ==
- Steve Lieberman (art/garage punk)
- Nomy Lamm (riot grrl)
- Yidcore (punk rock)
- Sons of Abraham (metalcore)
- Golem (folk punk)
- Rav Shmuel (anti-folk)
- The Shondes (riot grrrl)
- Can Can (art punk)
- Daniel Kahn & the Painted Bird (klezmer/folk punk)
- Moshiach Oi! (hardcore punk)
- The Groggers (pop punk)
- Bulletproof Stockings (post-punk)
- Schmekel (folk punk/queercore)

== See also ==
- Secular Jewish music
- Contemporary Jewish religious music
- Jewish rock
- Jewish hip hop
- Punk rock subgenres

== Bibliography ==
- Beeber, Steven Lee (2006). The Heebie-Jeebies at CBGB's: A Secret History of Jewish Punk. Chicago Review Press.
- Stratton, Jon (2008). Jewish Identity in Western Pop Culture: The Holocaust and Trauma Through Modernity. New York: Palgrave Macmillan. ISBN 978-0-230-60474-2.
- Croland, Michael (2016). Oy Oy Gevalt! Jews and Punk. ABC-CLIO.
