= Hebro =

- Also known as: Soulja, Rephael
- Born: Raphael Ohr Chaim Fulcher; May 30, 1987 (age 39); Crown Heights, Brooklyn, New York
- Genres: Jewish hip hop
- Years active: 2016–present
- Website: hebromusic.com

Raphael Ohr Chaim Fulcher (born May 30, 1987), known professionally as Hebro, is an American rapper, singer, songwriter, and record producer.

== Early life ==
Fulcher was born in the Crown Heights neighborhood of Brooklyn, New York, the youngest of six children. His parents are African American Orthodox Jews, having converted to Judaism in the 1970s under the guidance of Rabbi Jacob J. Hecht, known as the assistant and translator to the Lubavitcher Rebbe. The family left Crown Heights when Fulcher was four and he grew up in Rocky Mount and Charlotte, North Carolina as well as St. Louis, Missouri. He attended an Orthodox yeshiva from second grade through high school, then studied abroad in Israel. He has described the experience of growing up black in predominantly white Orthodox schools as "often challenging".

Hailing from a family of vocalists, Fulcher began making music for the first time after high school, performing freestyle raps at parties, weddings, and Battle of the Bands competitions both in Israel and at Queens College when he returned to America. It was while organizing musical events for the campus Chabad at Queens College that he discovered his love of singing live, and after spending Lag BaOmer at the Chevra Ahavas Yisroel synagogue, he decided to stay in Crown Heights and spend time honing his craft.

== Career ==
Fulcher was featured on Orthodox singer-songwriter Aryeh Kunstler's 2011 remix of "Gam", a song from Kunstler's 2010 album Our Eyes Are On You. The following year, Fulcher performed at a Purim concert at the Canal Room in Manhattan, alongside Moshe Hecht Band, The Groggers, and The Shop.

His debut single and music video, "Gam Ki Eilech", was released on September 26, 2016. The following year he released a Purim single, "Shoshanat Yaakov Remix", as well as "Far From Perfect", a collaboration with singer Pinny Schachter that was recorded and mixed by C Lanzbom.

Fulcher released his debut EP, Genesis, on March 21, 2018, through Bandlot Records. The EP featured both "Gam Ki Eilech" and "Far From Perfect", the latter of which was also remixed by Miami-based producer Nykore and released as a single. A release party was held at The Loft and Rooftop in Manhattan with Izzy Gilden, DJ Kamilly, and Simple Man, and Fulcher announced a planned music video for the track "Souljas" which would be based on the story of Cain and Abel. In 2020 he performed at a Purim concert at SOB's alongside Pinny Schachter, Zayah, and Yaakov Chesed.

Fulcher has performed with Matisyahu, Nissim Black, Moshav, Lipa Schmeltzer, and Zusha.

== Musical style ==
Fulcher's music combines hip hop with elements of pop, reggae, R&B, Motown, and EDM. Speaking to Shais Rishon for Tablet in 2016, Fulcher described his goal with music as "reclaiming Hip Hop/Pop/R&B as a powerfully conscious tool to promote awareness, peace, love, and unity across all borders. I’m on a mission to redefine conventional 'Jewish Music' by singing songs with themes based in scripture but with a new sound. To redefine the conventional image/definition of 'Orthodox Judaism.' It’s not just European and more than the black and white uniform, you know?"

== Personal life ==
Fulcher lives in the Wesley Hills area of Monsey, New York. He considers himself a Sephardi Jew but has a "deep love and appreciation for Chabad philosophy."

== Discography ==
=== EPs ===
- Genesis EP (2018, Bandlot)

=== Singles ===
- "Gam Ki Elech" (2016)
- "Shoshanat Yaakov Remix" (2017)
- "Far From Perfect" (ft. Pinny Schachter) (2017)
- "Far From Perfect (Nykore Remix)" (2018)

=== Guest appearances ===
- "Gam Remix" (Aryeh Kunstler ft. Hebro) (2011)
