= Jewcan Sam =

2012 single by The Groggers

Single by The Groggers
- Released: February 13, 2012
- Genre: Jewish rock; comedy rock; pop punk
- Length: 3:07
- Songwriter: The Groggers
- Producer: L.E. Doug Staiman

The Groggers singles chronology
| "The Shidduch Hits The Fan" (2011) | "Jewcan Sam" (2012) | "Not Going to Shacharis" (2014) |

Music video
- "Jewcan Sam" on YouTube

"Jewcan Sam (A Nose Job Love Story)" is a single and music video by the American Jewish pop punk band The Groggers. The song and video, commissioned by Miami plastic surgeon Dr. Michael Salzhauer, follow a Jewish high school student being turned down by a girl because of his large nose and subsequently trying to correct it with rhinoplasty. Both the band and Salzhauer received heavy criticism for the video's portrayal of plastic surgery, as well as perceived antisemitic imagery.

== Background and lyrical content ==
The Groggers, a satirical Jewish pop-punk band, were formed in 2010 by two Yeshiva University alumni, lead singer L.E. Doug Staiman and guitarist Ari Friedman. Originally a pickup group that Staiman used to record "Get", a song he wrote about the agunah crisis, they became a full-time band after "Get" found viral success, and released their debut album, There's No 'I' in Cherem, in 2011.

"Jewcan Sam", intended as the lead single for an unreleased second album, was commissioned by plastic surgeon Dr. Michael Salzhauer, who had previously gained attention for his controversial children's book My Beautiful Mommy. In preparation for the music video, Salzhauer offered the band members free rhinoplasty; Staiman was reportedly the only one to accept the offer.

The song's title, a play on Froot Loops mascot Toucan Sam, references the stereotype of Jews having abnormally large noses and needing rhinoplasty to correct it. Lyrically, the song's narrator recounts his girlfriend promising him long-term romance if he will only "get [his] nose circumcised", telling him, "No matter what you do or how hard you fight / Pinocchio never got Snow White". The narrator himself expresses his wish to "[look] more like Tom Cruise / And less like Adrien Brody".

== Music video ==
The song's video, the fifth directed by Farrell Goldsmith for the band, was released to YouTube on February 13, 2012.

The video depicts Staiman as a high school student who is told by his girlfriend (Allyson Olowin) that if he doesn't get a nose job, she will dump him for a smaller-nosed "stud" (Edgar Tefel). Throughout the video, she offers Staiman fantasies of Hollywood fame and fortune, all the while violently pursuing him with scissors, knives, and other sharp objects. Staiman finally breaks down and visits a plastic surgeon (Salzhauer), though he gets cold feet and flees the operating room until the surgeon talks him down. He returns to school with his new nose, only to be told that the girl "also only dates football players", which the "stud" is. Despite this, a female teacher (Danna Pycher) expresses interest and gives Staiman her phone number.

== Reception and controversy ==
The video sparked an ethics investigation of Salzhauer by the American Society of Plastic Surgeons, who called it "offensive and inappropriate" and said that he had failed "to uphold the dignity and honor of the medical profession."

The video was also accused of promoting antisemitic stereotypes; Andrew Rosenkranz, the Anti-Defamation League's Florida director, said, "For hundreds of years Jews have been depicted negatively with distorted features, including large hooked noses...It’s a physical trait that is associated with the image of the Jew as someone who doesn’t belong, someone who is alien." Renee Ghert-Zand of The Forward also criticized the video, saying, "What The Groggers’ fans love about them is their playing up — not into — the absurdities, insecurities and idiosyncrasies of Jewish life and identity. They may think they have put forth a positive message in 'Jewcan Sam,' but they haven't....The whole thing just reeks of eau de publicity stunt."

Salzhauer responded by saying the song was "meant to be funny, not offensive" and argued that the video actually discourages the procedure, pointing out that Staiman's character "doesn't get the girl at the end of the video." Salzhauer and Staiman appeared on an April 2012 episode of CBS's The Doctors to talk about the video.

Following the song's controversy, The Groggers went on hiatus, although they returned later in the year with another single, "Mindy". The following disclaimer was later added to the official video on YouTube:

"This video is intended as a comedic parody. All surgery has risks. Plastic surgery should only be considered after extensive consultation with a qualified medical professional. The video is not meant to diagnose, treat or cure any medical condition. It is not intended to imply or guarantee surgical success or outcome. It is also not meant to condone or encourage teen bullying, anti-semitism, scissor throwing by cheerleaders, student-teacher relationships, jumping on Oprah's couch like Tom Cruise, piano playing, underage drinking on your neighbor's balcony, driving a Porsche with a guy wearing a wig and holding a threatening hammer, taping your nose to impress a girl, eating Fruit Loops, performing nasal surgery with circumcision instruments and rabbi present, walking into scissor shaped hedges, cutting peanut butter and jelly sandwiches with a giant steak knife, doing your boyfriend's math homework, or attending art class at 8AM on Monday....."

== Personnel ==
The Groggers

- L.E. Doug Staiman – vocals
- Ari Friedman – guitar
- Josh Koperwas – bass
- Drew Salzman – drums

Other

- Jake Antelis – mixing, mastering
