= G-Nome Project =

American-Israeli livetronica group

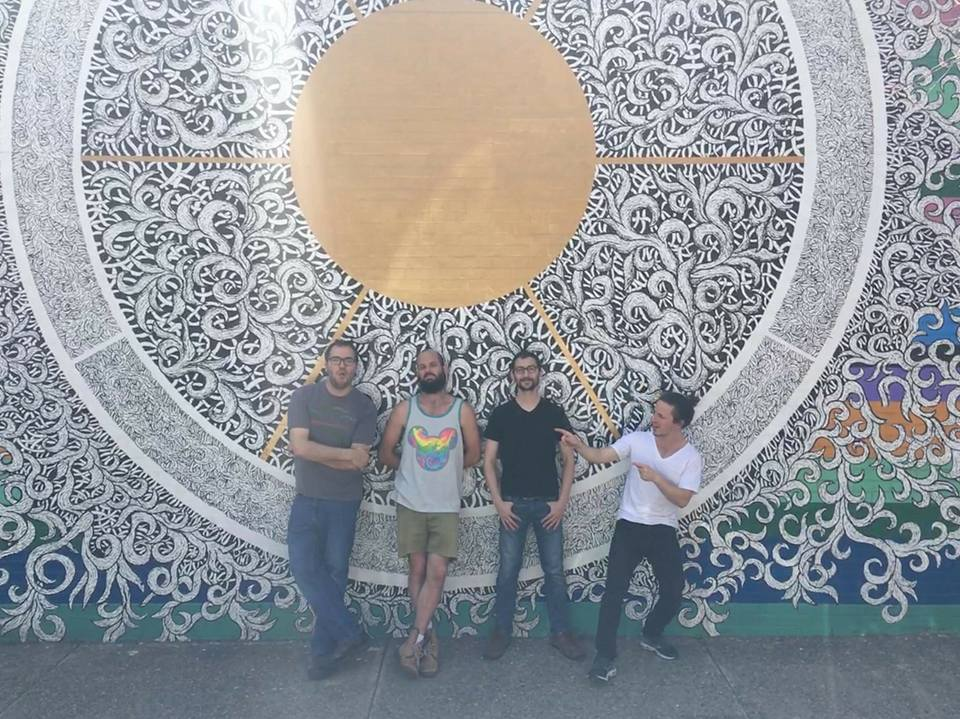
- G-Nome Project photographed outside of the Circle Thrift store in the Kensington neighborhood of Philadelphia

Background information
- Origin: Jerusalem, Israel
- Genres: Livetronica, electro funk, psytrance
- Years active: 2012–present
- Members: Eyal Salomon; Zechariah Reich; Yakir Hyman; Eran Asias
- Past members: Eli Schabes; Shlomo Langer; Chemy Soibelman
- Website: g-nomeproject.com

G-Nome Project is an American-Israeli livetronica group formed in Jerusalem in 2012.

== History ==
The band was formed in November 2012 in Jerusalem. Guitarist Yakir Hyman and bassist Zechariah Reich grew up together in Teaneck, New Jersey, and played their first concert together at Teaneck High School with Jon Shiffman of Steel Train. Chemy Soibelman was the original drummer for the New York pop punk band The Groggers, performing on their debut album, There's No 'I' in Cherem. Hyman and Reich are both former members of the Israeli rock band Hamakor, with whom Soibelman and Langer occasionally played until their disbandment in 2015.

In 2014, the band used Indiegogo to fund their first American tour, the eleven-city Giving Tour, during which the band alternated nightly performances with charitable acts such as visiting nursing homes and volunteering at soup kitchens.

They have performed at the Great North Music and Arts Festival in Norridgewock, Maine every year since 2014, performing alongside GRiZ and David Tipper in 2014, Reggie Watts, Lettuce, and Joe Russo's Almost Dead in 2015, the Disco Biscuits and Cut Chemist in 2016, and Lotus in 2017.

In the winter of 2016, G-Nome Project announced on their Facebook page that founding member and guitarist Yakir Hyman was leaving the band and being replaced by Shlomo Langer, an Israeli guitar player from Jerusalem. The band's 2016 Get Toasty Tour was Yakir's last U.S. tour with G-Nome Project; his final show took place on the holiday of Purim, March 24, 2016, in Jerusalem. Shlomo Langer's first show with the band was an impromptu performance at a Yom HaAtzma'ut party in Jerusalem, and his first U.S. tour with the band was the Another One Bites the Crust Tour in the summer of 2016.

In June 2016, G-Nome Project was featured as an "On the Verge" artist by Relix magazine.

In the Spring of 2017, G-Nome Project made their Canadian debut, performing at Gagetown, New Brunswick's 9th annual Folly Fest.

In the winter of 2018, the band announced via their Facebook page that drummer Chemy Soibelman was leaving the band and being replaced by Jerusalem drummer Eli Schabes. Eli's first show with the band took place on April 12, 2018 at 118 North in Wayne, Pennsylvania.

During G-Nome Project's 2018 Summer Tour, bassist Zechariah Reich was replaced by Clay Parnell of the band Particle for two festival performances, Disc Jam Music Festival and Sababa Fest.

Following a hiatus of a few years, Yakir told The Jerusalem Post in an interview that he had rejoined the band and that the band would resume touring. Prior to the band's first U.S. run since 2018, it was likewise announced that Eran Asias had joined the band as their new drummer.

== Musical style ==
G-Nome Project plays livetronica, a fusion of jam band-style live improvisation with electronica. The band has dubbed its style "Grilled Cheese Funk" in reference to their initial lo-fi sound, which they felt as having the same sizzle and pop of the grilled cheese sandwiches being cooked and served at outdoor music festivals. The band is primarily influenced by Phish and Disco Biscuits, as well as the Israeli psychedelic trance scene and American funk, jazz, and classic rock.

== Members ==
Current members

- Yakir Hyman – guitar (2012–2016, 2021-present)
- Eyal Salomon – keyboards (2012–present)
- Zechariah Reich – bass (2012–present)
- Eran Asias – drums (2022–present)

Past members

- Eli Schabes - drums (2018-2019)
- Shlomo Langer – guitar (2016-2019)
- Chemy Soibelman - drums (2012-2018)

== North American Tours ==
2014:

- The Giving Tour

2015:

- Northeast Run
- Grilled Cheese Funk Tour

2016:

- Get Toasty
- Another One Bites the Crust

2017:

- Winter Groove Tour
- Spring Tour
- September Run
- Digital Gouda Fall Tour

2018:

- Animals: Evolved Tour
- 2018 Summer Tour
- Get Lit - A Livetronukkah Tour

2022:

- Spring 2022 Tour
- Summer 2022 Tour
- Get Pumped!

2023:

- YALLA!
- Charge!

== Discography ==
Singles

- "Onflict" (2014)
- "Pure Imagination" (2023)
- "Mouse Kingdom" (2023)

Live Albums

- "Live Cuts: Yalla! Winter Tour 2023"
