= Red Axes =

Israeli music duo

- Origin: Tel Aviv, Israel
- Genres: Disco; garage rock; dance; electronic; post punk; psychedelic rock; techno; new wave
- Years active: 2010–present
- Labels: Garzen Records
- Members: Dori Sadovnik; Niv Arzi
- Website: https://garzenrecords.bandcamp.com/

Red Axes is an Israeli electronic and indie music duo formed in 2010 by Dori Sadovnik and Niv Arzi. Based in Tel Aviv, the duo's eclectic sound range is influenced by many genres, including disco, house, garage rock, post punk, psychedelic rock and techno.

== History ==
Arzi and Sadovnik met and began writing songs together when they were 14. Three years later, they formed Red Cotton, a four-member psychedelic rock band that included Udi Naor and Yovav, Arzi's brother.

The year after releasing their debut album, 2006's memory card, the band made plans to go to London but only managed to reach Amsterdam. After four months the Red Cotton band broke up, with Arzi and Sadovnik electing to remain in Amsterdam, and tour Europe, broadening their musical experience and repertoire. After spending some time living in Amsterdam and touring Europe, the two Dj/Producers with Naor as the head producer started a rave party brand in Tel Aviv called "Break It!". The first Red Axes EP was released in 2010. During the following years, Red Axes went on to release on a variety of labels including Crosstown Rebels, Hivern Discs, Permanent Vacation, Correspondent, Life and Death, Dark Entries, Multi Culti, and I'm a Cliche.

Red Axes' first full-length album, Ballad of the Ice, appeared under the I'm a Cliché label in 2014. The vocal- and guitar-heavy album included additional collaborations with Abrão as well as a cover of Bauhaus '"Bela Lugosi's Dead." Following the release of the Ballad of Ice" album, the duo initiated a worldwide tour, gaining international recognition both on the dance floors and in the music charts worldwide.

In 2016, the duo launched their own record label named Garzen Records, releasing records such as: The White Screen, Abrao, Deaf Chonky, The Crotches, Siam and their own latest album "The Beach Goths". Beach Goths was produced in their studio in collaboration with the extended Garzen family – Abrão, Eylonzo Crotch, Gabriel Broid, Adi Bronicki, Thomas Jacksonn & Iñigo Vontier were all featured in the 12 track album with the stated intention of creating a "new psychedelic cosmic adventure" for fans. The result has been described as "innovative in the simplicity with which it talks to the soul of the listener as well as in the assortment of music references that every single track contains. The Beach Goths consists of 12 tracks that can be viewed as paths; none of them is restricted to a specific interpretation though, what is clearly defined is the element that brings them together – an invitation to approach music in the most natural way, in the awareness that every listening experience conceals a purely and exclusively subjective interpretation."

Over 2016, they went on to produce "Kill The DJ", characterized by dark, new wave flavors, and had two releases on Multi Culti (including remixes of 'Waiting for a Surprise'). They issued three collaborations with Moscoman: ‘Dikembe Manutu’, a more Middle Eastern-flavored ‘Subaru Pesha’ and a remix of ‘Fernandez’, characterized by its unexpected tangents and a trippy EP for Endless Flight. It was their ‘Sun My Sweet Sun’ that "perhaps drew most attention with its bells, chimes and simple but highly memorable flute melody".

In 2016 they established their own festival, called: "Garzen Festival" and curated party nights around the world. Red Axes have various performing acts either as Dj's, live electronic duo, or as a Live band called "Red Axes 4".

International appearance venuses of Red Axes have included: Sonar, Burning Man, Coachella, Berghain/Panorama Bar, Glastonbury, Dekmantel, DGTL, Field Day, Pacha Ibiza, Fusion, Nachtdigital, FYF, Convenanza, ADE, Beats in space and Houghton.

In 2016, the duo initiated the "Red Axes around the world" project in Africa, in which they travel to remote locations, performing recordings and workshops with local musicians and students. These activities are being compiled into a serial documentary, the first episode having been filmed in Ethiopia and the Ivory Coast.

== Awards ==
- 2016 – The "ACUM" Prize (Israeli copyrights association) for exceptional achievements in electronic music
- 2016 – No. 35 on Resident Advisor – Top 100 Live Acts of 2016
- 2016 – No. 26 – Sun my sweet sun – Resident Advisor – Top 50 Tracks of 2016
- 2016 – No. 7 on the Beatport Top 10 Indie dance – Nu Disco Artists of 2016
- 2016 – Xlr8r – Most Downloaded Track
- 2016 – Subaru Pesha
- 2017: 9th place – Best Dj Mix Time Out New York.
- 2017 – Walla Nightlife Awards- Best Dj/Producer

== Discography ==
=== Albums ===
Name	Label	Year released
Ballad of the Ice	I'm A Cliché	2014
The Beach Goths	Garzen Records	2017
One More City	Fabric Records	2023

=== Singles ===
Name	Label	Year released
Bela (12", EP)	Klasse Recordings	2011
Tour De Chile (5xFile, MP3, EP, 320)	I'm A Cliché	2012
Red Axes Featuring Abrão – Caminho De Dreyfus (12")	Correspondent	2013
Kicks Out of You (12")	I'm A Cliché	2014
Shem Vol. 2 2 versions	I'm A Cliché	2015
Waiting for a Surprise	Multi Culti	2015
Sabor Feat. Abrao (12")	Crosstown Rebels	2015
Marvin & Guy, Red Axes – 7HVN06 (7", Ltd)	Hivern Discs	2015
Pil Sagol (12", EP)	Hivern Discs	2015
Red Axes / Rouge Mécanique – Special Delivery (12", W/Lbl, Han)	Edit Service	2015
Ahuzat Bait (12", EP, Ltd)	Garzen Records	2015
Shem Vol. 1 (12", EP)	I'm A Cliché	2015
Red Axes & C.A.R. – Car Axes	Kill The DJ Records	2016
Sun My Sweet Sun	Permanent Vacation	2016
Waiting for a Remix	Multi Culti	2016
Red Axes + Moscoman + Krikor – Subaru Pesha (12")	Disco Halal	2016
Caminho de Dreyfus (12")	CORRESPONDANT	2016
Bubble Cat (12")	Endless Flight	2016
Moscoman & Red Axes – Dikembe Manutu / Rage in the Cage (12")	ESP Institute	2016
Sun My Sweet Sun Remix	Permanent Vacation	2017
Nyx Tape	Dark Entries	2017
Kalacol EP	Life And Death	2017
