= Chemy Soibelman =

American drummer

- Birth name: Nechemia Soibelman
- Also known as: Chemy Chummus
- Born: Brooklyn, New York, United States
- Origin: Los Angeles, California
- Genres: Jewish rock, alternative rock, livetronica
- Instrument(s): Drums, percussion
- Years active: 2010–present

Nechemia "Chemy" Soibelman is an American drummer. He was a founding member of The Groggers and played on their debut album, There's No 'I' in Cherem (2011). He is also a former member of the Israeli Jewish rock band Hamakor and the livetronica group G-Nome Project.

== Career ==
=== The Groggers ===
Soibelman became a founding member of The Groggers in 2010 when he, guitarist Ari Friedman, and bassist C.J. Glass were recruited by lead singer L.E. Doug Staiman to film a video for the song "Get", which Staiman had written. The video became a minor viral hit, and the band subsequently released their debut album, There's No 'I' in Cherem. Soibelman initially concealed his involvement with the band due to their controversial material, to the point of wearing a mask in promotional photos, before ultimately revealing his identity.

=== Hamakor and G-Nome Project ===
Following his time with the Groggers, Soibelman co-founded the Jerusalem-based livetronica band G-Nome Project in 2012 with guitarist Yakir Hyman, bassist Zechariah Reich, and keyboardist Eyal Salomon. Their debut single, "Onflict", was released in 2014.

Also in 2014, Soibelman was briefly part of the new lineup of the Israeli Jewish rock band Hamakor, of which Hyman and Reich had previously been members. He performed on their single "Lift Me Up".

=== Other work ===
After leaving G-Nome Project in early 2018, Soibelman relocated to New York City and became the drummer for the wedding band Blue Melody. Later that year, he became the drummer for Zusha.

== Influences ==
Soibelman has named Bob Marley, The Police, Michael Jackson, and Yaakov Shwekey as his personal musical inspirations.

== Discography ==
=== With The Groggers ===
- There's No 'I' in Cherem (2011)
  - "Get" (2010)
  - "Eishes Chayil" (2010)
  - "Upper West Side Story" (2011)
  - "The Shidduch Hit the Fan" (2011)

=== With Hamakor ===
- "Lift Me Up" (single, 2014)

=== With G-Nome Project ===
- G-Nome Project, "Onflict" (single, 2014)
