= Aryeh Kunstler =

American Orthodox Jewish musician

- Born: Belle Harbor, Queens, New York
- Origin: New York City, New York
- Genres: Jewish rock, alternative rock
- Occupations: Singer, songwriter, guitarist, producer, composer
- Instruments: Vocals, guitar, bass
- Years active: 2004–present
- Labels: Aderet, Sameach, Roar
- Website: aryehkunstler.com

Aryeh Kunstler is an American Orthodox Jewish singer, songwriter, guitarist, producer, and composer.

Born into a musical family, Kunstler performed with his brother Dani in the group V'Havieinu before starting a solo career, releasing his debut album, From the Depths, in 2007. He also became the bassist for the rock band Yaakov Chesed. He currently plays guitar with the EvanAl Orchestra and is a record producer and arranger, having worked with artists including Benny Friedman, The Groggers, and Yosef Karduner.

== Early life ==
Kunstler grew up in Belle Harbor, Queens, New York. His father, Avi Kunstler, was a professional singer, as was Aryeh's brother Dani, a member of the Miami Boys Choir. Both were featured on the choir's first live album, Miami Experience 1 (1991), duetting on the song "K'rachem Av". Despite this, Aryeh initially had little interest in music, turning down offers to join the Choir and giving up guitar lessons after three months. He only began seriously pursuing music in seventh grade, when a friend who had just received a drum set for his bar mitzvah asked him to bring his guitar over to play with him.

He attended Touro College and Sh'or Yoshuv yeshiva.

== Career ==
=== V'Havieinu ===
In 2004, he began recording with Dani and several other singers under the name V'Havieinu. Although minimally involved in their first album, he became a prominent vocalist and arranger with the group starting with Vol. 2 (2006).

=== Solo albums and Yaakov Chesed ===
In 2007, Kunstler released his debut solo album, From The Depths. Produced by Eli Yona, the album featured vocals from Dani and Lenny Solomon of Shlock Rock, as well as a song co-written with Peter Himmelman, "Show Me Your Love".

The same year, Kunstler became the bassist for Yeshiva University-based rock band Yaakov Chesed after previous bassist Dovi Salamon left to attend Yeshiva in Israel. Kunstler subsequently began touring with the band and has played on both of their albums, Rise Above (2007) and The Passage (2009).

In 2010, he released his second solo album, Our Eyes Are On You, recorded with producer and former Genesis drummer Nir Zidkyahu. During this time, Kuntsler had been touring with a backing band called the Aryeh Kunstler Band (AKB), featuring drummer Avidon Moscovits (formerly a guitarist for Yehuda Green), Avromi Spitz, and Eli Staiman, the latter of whom would become known as the lead singer of The Groggers. (Kunstler would later collaborate with Staiman and The Groggers, engineering their first album and co-writing their 2014 song "Not Going to Shacharis".) In 2011, he released a remix of his song "Gam" with Orthodox rapper Hebro, and in 2012 he released a cover of Moshav's "Don't Give Up". The following year, he joined Benny Friedman and Shloime Dachs for a fundraising concert at Congregation Ohab Zedek, with proceeds going to help Kunstler's hometown of Belle Harbor in the wake of Hurricane Sandy.

In December 2019, nine years after his last album, Kunstler returned to music with a new single, "Up Like A Lion". Two months later, he released the song "Keli" featuring Yosef Karduner.

=== Other work ===
Kunstler contributed guitar and arrangements to singer Benny Friedman's second album, Yesh Tikvah (2012). He was also featured in the video for the album's single "Maaleh Ani".

In 2013, Kunstler, Yaakov Chesed bandmate Jake Polansky, Immanuel Shalev of The Maccabeats, and recording artist Simcha Leiner were judges at the third annual V'Ata Banim Shiru, an a cappella competition at Torah Academy of Bergen County that raises money for the Koby Mandell Foundation. That same year, he contributed to the Moshe Yess tribute album The Yess Legacy with a cover of "Coming Home".

== Discography ==
=== As main artist ===
==== Albums ====
- From The Depths (2007)
- Our Eyes Are On You (2010)

==== Singles ====
- 2009: "Yisroel Betach Bashem" (Dancing Bear Orchestra ft. Aryeh Kunstler and Yosi Piamenta) (MRM Music)
- 2009: "B'Lev Echad"
- 2010: "Modim"
- 2011: "Gam: The Remix" (ft. Hebro)
- 2011: "Nachamu Unplugged"
- 2012: "Don't Give Up" (Moshav Band cover)
- 2019: "V'hakohanim"
- 2019: "Up Like A Lion"
- 2020: "Keli" (ft. Yosef Karduner)
- 2020: "Time of Freedom"
- 2020: "Closer" (with DJ Kraz)
- 2020: "Accept"
- 2020: "Alone in the Field With You"
- 2020: "The Promise"
- 2020: "Ben Kodesh Lechol" (with Baruch Kunstler)
- 2021: "In Jerusalem" (with Dani & Avi Kunstler)
- 2021: "Oto Chalom" (with Eliyahu Chait)
- 2021: "Just Sing" (with Gabe Gottesman)
- 2021: "Od Yishoma"
- 2021: "These Words"
- 2022: "Within Your Walls"
- 2022: "Passing Over" (Passover single)

==== Compilations ====
- The Yess Legacy: A Tribute to the Music of Moshe Yess (2013) – "Coming Home"

=== With Yaakov Chesed ===
- Rise Above (2007)
- The Passage (2009)

=== With V'Havieinu ===
- V'Havieinu Vol. 2 (2006)
- V'Havieinu Vol. 3 (2008)
- V'Havieinu Vol. 4 (2014)

=== Other ===
- V'Havieinu Vol. 1 (2004) – guitar
- The Groggers, There's No 'I' in Cherem – engineering
- The Avoda, "Spread The Light" (2011) – co-directed music video with Doug Staiman
- Benny Friedman, Yesh Tikvah (2012) – guitar, arrangement
- Benny Friedman, "Light One Candle" (Peter, Paul and Mary cover) (2013) – arrangement, recording
- The Groggers, "Not Going to Shacharis" (2014) – co-writer with Doug Staiman
