= Get (song) =

Single by The Groggers

from the album There's No 'I' in Cherem
- Released: May 2, 2010
- Genre: Jewish music; pop punk
- Length: 2:24
- Label: CD Baby
- Songwriter: Doug Staiman

The Groggers singles chronology
"Get" (2010)	"Eishes Chayil" (2010)

"Get" is the debut single and music video by American Jewish pop punk band The Groggers, taken from their debut album There's No 'I' in Cherem. It is also the group's first song recorded together; written by lead singer L.E. Doug Staiman before the band had formed, he decided to film a low-budget music video for the song using a pickup band, which would later become The Groggers.

== Background ==
Staiman conceived of the song while working at a Jewish family law firm, where he often had to deal with couples caught in messy divorces.

Staiman wrote "Get" in 15 minutes while playing for a camp with Aryeh Kunstler. Having received positive feedback on his music from friends but believing it was too niche to go anywhere, Staiman decided to film a low-budget video for "Get" using pickup musicians, including friend and former Yeshiva University classmate Ari Friedman. After the video became a small viral hit, Staiman, Friedman, and the other musicians decided to form the Groggers.

== Lyrical content ==
The song satirically addresses the issue of an agunah, a Jewish woman whose husband refuses to grant her a get, or Jewish divorce, effectively preventing her from marrying anyone else. In the song, Staiman encourages such a husband to admit his failings and give his wife the divorce ("You gotta get, get, get, get, give her a get/'Cause she don't love you no more"). Following its release, the song became a popular tool among agunah activists.

== Music video ==
The video, directed by then-film student Farrell Goldsmith, was made for $30 and shot in one day. It was released on May 2, 2010; by early 2012, it had 115,000 views on YouTube, an uncommon feat for Jewish music videos.

The video depicts a man in a failing marriage being hounded by the band to grant her a divorce, even being tied to a chair.

== Personnel ==
- L.E. Doug Staiman – lead vocals, guitar, lyrics
- Ari Friedman – lead guitar, backing vocals
- C.J. Glass – bass guitar
- Chemy Soibelman – drums
