= New York soul =

Soul music recorded and produced in New York City

- Stylistic origins: Soul; R&B
- Cultural origins: 1960s, New York City, New York, U.S

Other topics
- Memphis soul; Philadelphia soul

New York soul refers to the soul music recorded and produced in New York City. New York soul was similar in style to Memphis soul from the southern US, but it was more likely to have string arrangements (played by string sections) added to the recordings. Unlike most southern soul, New York soul was not typically recorded by "house bands". Instead, New York soul was usually recorded by session musicians who were hired for a single recording.

Since the musicians were not a regular backup band that played together all the time, the playing was not as loose and spontaneous as a typical southern band's playing. Nevertheless, since the NYC session players were experienced musicians, they played with a professional style. Another difference between New York soul and southern soul was that New York soul was recorded in a city that boasted what in the 1960s were some of the most state of the art recording studios, which were significantly more advanced than a typical southern studio. This gave a crisp sound to the recordings.

== Labels ==
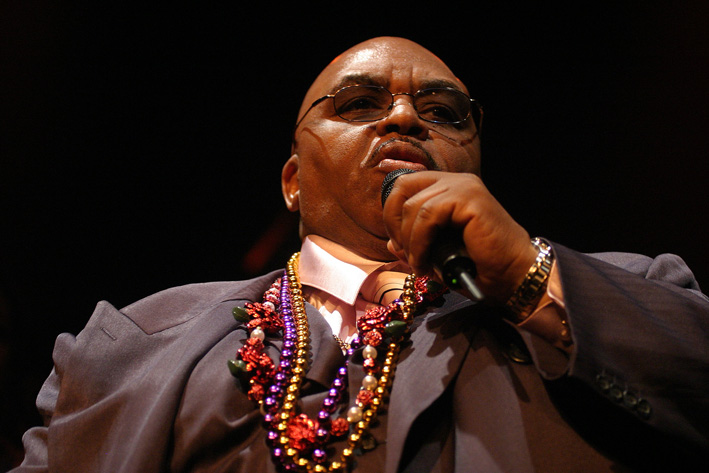
Solomon Burke performing in 2008.

While there were a number of New York soul labels, including Scepter, Sue, Shout and Colla, the most well-known label was Atlantic Records, which dominated 1960s soul. Atlantic Records singers included Solomon Burke, Doris Troy and Aretha Franklin. 1967-68 was a peak period for Atlantic, as the string of hits coming from the Stax roster was augmented by the tremendous crossover success of Franklin, who shot to fame, becoming the preeminent female soul artist of the era, and earning the title "Queen of Soul". Jerry Wexler signed Franklin to Atlantic in January 1967 after the expiry of her contract with Columbia Records. She had a run of seven consecutive singles that made both the US pop and soul Top 10, and of which five were million-sellers; "I Never Loved A Man (The Way I Love You)" (b/w "Do Right Woman") (soul #1, pop #9), "Respect" (soul and pop #1), "Baby, I Love You" (soul #1, pop #4), "(You Make Me Feel Like) A Natural Woman" (soul #2, pop #8), "Chain of Fools" (soul #1, pop #2), "Since You've Been Gone" (1968, soul #1, pop #5) and "Think" (1968, soul #1, pop #7).
