= Pit orchestra =

Musical ensemble accompanying a theater performance

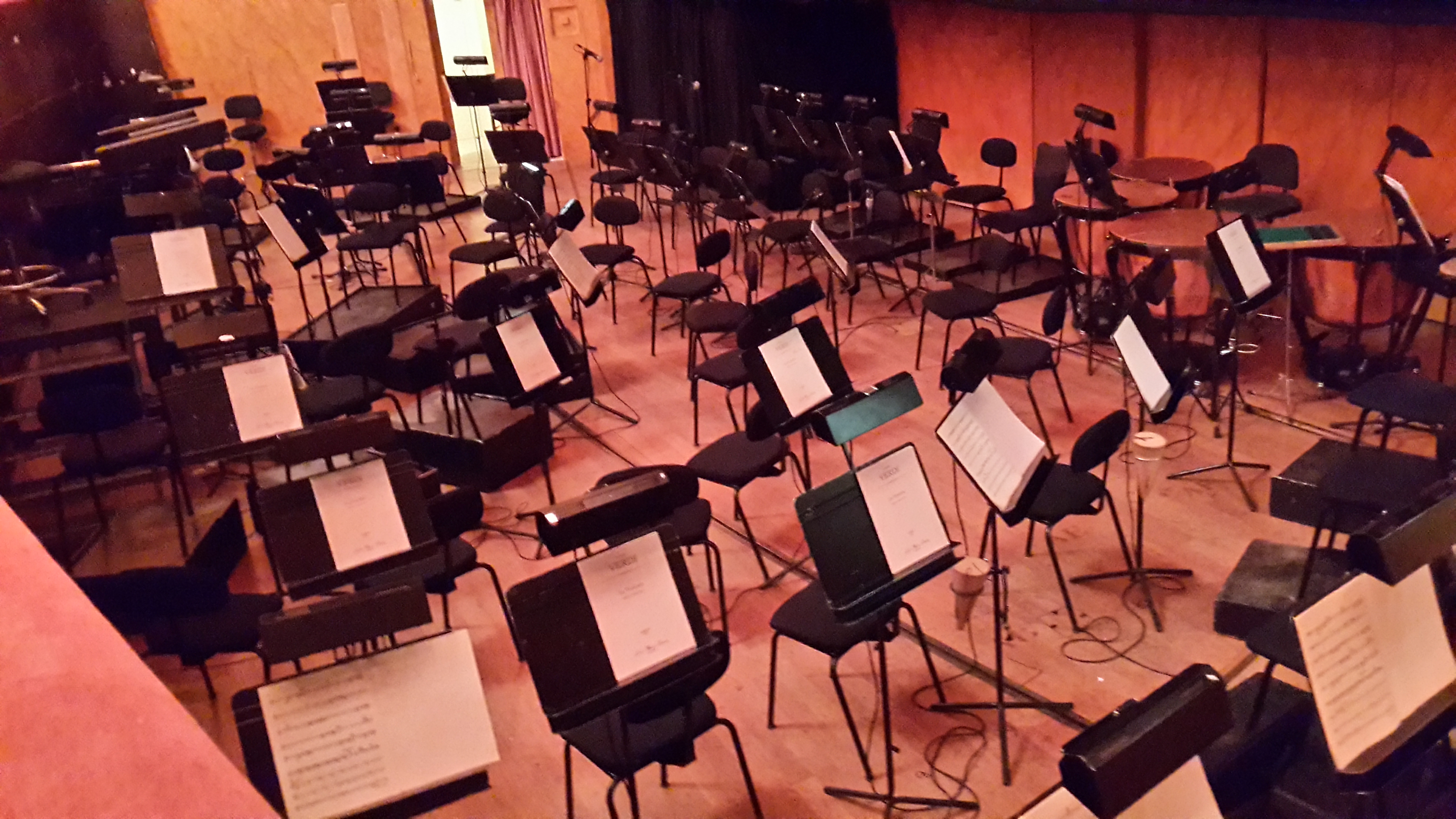
The pit of La Fenice in Venice

A pit orchestra is a type of orchestra that accompanies performers in musicals, operas, ballets, and other shows involving music. The term was also used for orchestras accompanying silent movies when more than a piano was used. In performances of operas and ballets, the pit orchestra is typically similar in size to a symphony orchestra, though it may contain smaller string and brass sections, depending upon the piece. Such orchestras may vary in size from approximately 30 musicians (early Baroque and Classical opera) to as many as 90–100 musicians (Wagnerian opera). However, because of financial, spatial, and volume concerns, current musical theatre pit orchestras are considerably smaller (20–30 musicians at most, including a maximum of around ten string players).

== Description ==
Typically, pit orchestras play in a lowered area in front of the stage called an orchestra pit, rather than being on the stage as for a concert. Inside the pit, the conductor stands facing towards the stage with their back towards the audience to coordinate the music with the vocals and actions of the singers, dancers and actors, while the orchestra sits facing the conductor. The conductor may also sit at one or more keyboards and conduct as well as play, which often means the use of more head and facial gestures rather than hand gestures. This is often the case when a show only requires a small orchestra, or on national tours, where the instrumentation is often reduced from the original arrangement and one or two keyboard players substitute for several instruments. In some cases, theatres do not have a lowered pit; in this case, the pit orchestra may play in a room near the stage, watching the conductor's gestures using a video monitor, or from the floor level, between the first row of seats and the (higher) stage.

Music parts for pit orchestra woodwind players in musical theatre are normally divided into "reed books". Orchestration varies with each show based on the type of music that will be performed, such as jazz, classical, or blues. For example, a Reed 1 Book may contain music for piccolo, flute, alto saxophone, clarinet, and/or oboe. A musician handed a reed book would be expected to play each part. Because the musician plays so many different instruments, they are referred to as a "doubler" (even though the reed books may have up to eight instruments each). In general, individual reed books tend to fall into one of 3 categories: high reed, low reed, and double reed. High reed books may contain soprano, alto, or tenor saxophone; Bb, bass, or E-flat clarinet; and flute, alto flute or piccolo. Low reed books may contain bass or contrabass clarinet, baritone or bass saxophone, and bassoon. Double reed books may contain oboe and English horn, often in addition to flute, clarinet or saxophone. Due to the need for certain instruments to play solo or group parts throughout a musical, higher reed books often contain more doubled instruments throughout, whereas lower reed books contain fewer. For example, in West Side Story, clarinet and bass clarinet parts are present in each of the top four reed books, even though they rarely play simultaneously; rather, in certain sections of the music, a few of these parts must play simultaneously while instruments that are only present on a single part (such as alto saxophone, E-flat clarinet, oboe, English horn, and soprano saxophone) play separately. However, the Reed 5 book contains only bassoon parts, which are not present on any other books.

Musicians who play in pit orchestras are not only required to play multiple instruments at times, but they must also be familiar with (and able to play in) multiple keys, styles, and tempos and make a switch instantaneously. The orchestration for a musical is written in a key best suited to range of the singer. Some keys are more difficult to play in than others because of the increased attention that greater amounts of sharps and flats require. Musicals also tend to have a number of styles which can range from a soulful ballad to a syncopated funk tune to a driving hard rock song. Many musicians have been trained to play in a certain style, such as classical music, but in order to play in pit orchestras, musicians must be able to play a range of different styles. Because musicals are live, many elements can change from show to show; pit orchestra musicians consequently should be able to play different tempos every night and even skip through their music to a new spot if an actor or singer makes an error.

== Preparation ==
As with any orchestra or similar ensemble, a pit orchestra rehearses with the singers and dancers before the public performances commence. The rehearsals are led by the conductor/music director, who sets the tempos, starts the songs and musical interludes and indicates pauses and endings of sections.

Although members of a pit orchestra are not required to demonstrate great stage presence, and they may work out of sight from much of the audience, they can generally be seen from the balcony seats and are thus required to adhere to standard rules of dress and appearance (e.g., formal clothes)

Preparation by musicians in a pit orchestra consists of much more than attending rehearsals. Before the first rehearsal, ensemble musicians individually practice their parts, particularly difficult sections (rapid passages, very high or low-register sections) and exposed passages (e.g., instrumental solos). Performers often listen to a recording of the show to learn the tempos and playing styles, particularly if there are sections where the pit orchestra has complex parts which depend on the onstage actors or singers' parts (e.g., a big orchestra chord might have to coincide with the firing of a prop gun onstage).

== Size ==
Pit orchestras can range from large orchestras to small rock combos (e.g., guitar/keyboards/bass/drums). While a pit orchestra usually plays in the orchestra pit, there are times when they are on stage in the background (this is usually for rock musicals). In some cases, one or more members of the pit orchestra may have to appear in costume on stage with their instrument and play music as part of a scene. Below are pit orchestra examples from four major theatrical license companies: Music Theatre International, Concord Theatricals, The Really Useful Group and Theatrical Rights Worldwide (excluding any conductor scores unless needed). These show the varying sizes of pit orchestras. Note that string parts are often written with the intent of having two musicians play a specific part, especially in older musicals.

In the 2000s, due to budget constraints, some musicals have replaced instruments from musical arrangements with keyboards. For example, instead of hiring a small string section, a musical may hire one or two synthesizer players to perform the string parts or the horn parts. Some musicals have used prerecorded backing track music for shows, which has led to controversy.

Bye Bye Birdie (orchestration according to Concord Theatricals, the company that holds the license)

The score was orchestrated by Robert Ginzler.

- 3 Violin Books (6 players)
- 2 Cello Books (4 players)
- Bass
- Reed 1: Alto sax, clarinet, flute, piccolo
- Reed 2: Alto sax, clarinet
- Reed 3: Tenor sax, clarinet
- Reed 4: Clarinet, bass clarinet, baritone sax
- Horn
- Trumpets 1 & 2
- Trumpet 3
- Trombone 1
- Trombone 2
- Piano
- 2 Percussion 1 & 2 (trap drum set and mallet instruments; one plays drums and the other plays mallet instruments)
- Guitar/Banjo
- Total players: 25 players, if a full string section is to be used.

Note that this orchestration is slightly different from the orchestration of the original Broadway production, which also called for a third trombone, a fifth reed, a harp, and did not have a dedicated piano player.

Man of La Mancha (orchestration according to Concord Theatricals, the company that holds the license)

- Reed I (Flute, Piccolo)
- Reed II (Flute, Piccolo)
- Reed III (Oboe)
- Reed IV (Clarinet)
- Reed V (Clarinet, Bassoon)
- 2 Horns
- 2 Trumpets
- 1 Tenor Trombone
- 1 Bass Trombone
- 1 Timpani (2 pedal or 3 hand-tuned Drums)
- Percussion I (Drum Set, Snare Drum, Bass Drum, Floor Tom Tom, Suspended Cymbal, Triangle)
- Percussion II (Tambourine, Castanets, Temple Blocks (or 2 Wood Blocks), Larger Floor Tom Tom, Suspended Cymbal, Finger Cymbals, Xylophone, Bells)
- 2 Spanish Guitars (This part includes all Stage Guitar music.)
- 1 String Bass
- Total Players: 17

Peter Pan (orchestration according to Music Theatre International, the company that holds the license)

The score was orchestrated by Albert Sendrey.

- 9 Strings
  2 Violin I
  2 Violin II
  2 Viola
  2 Cello
  1 Bass
- 1 Harp
- 1 Horn
- 3 Trumpets
- 1 Trombone
- Reed I (Flute, Piccolo)
- Reed II (Flute, Piccolo)
- Reed III (English Horn, Oboe)
- Reed IV (Clarinet)
- Reed V (Clarinet)
- Reed VI (Bassoon, Bass Clarinet)
- 2 Percussion
- 1 Keyboard (Piano, Celeste)
- Total: 24 Players

Note that the owner who holds the license to this show was originally Samuel French, Inc. until 2013 when Music Theatre International purchased the rights to it.

West Side Story

The score was orchestrated by Sid Ramin and Irwin Kostal following detailed instructions from composer Leonard Bernstein, who then wrote revisions on their manuscript (the original, heavily annotated by Ramin, Kostal and Bernstein himself is in the Rare Books and Manuscripts Library at Columbia University). Ramin, Kostal, and Bernstein are billed as orchestrators for the show.

- 5 woodwinds
  Reed I (piccolo, flute, alto saxophone, clarinet, bass clarinet)
  Reed II (E-flat clarinet, clarinet, bass clarinet)
  Reed III (piccolo, flute, oboe, English horn, tenor saxophone, baritone saxophone, clarinet, bass clarinet)
  Reed IV (piccolo, flute, soprano saxophone, bass saxophone, clarinet, bass clarinet)
  Reed V (bassoon)
- 7 brass
  2 horns in F
  3 trumpets in B♭ (2nd doubling trumpet in D)
  2 trombones
- 5 percussion
  Timpani (1 player)
  percussion (4 players – traps, vibraphone, 4 pitched drums, guiro, xylophone, 3 bongos, 3 cowbells, conga, timbales, snare drum, police whistle, gourd, 2 suspended cymbals, castanets, maracas, finger cymbals, tambourines, small maracas, glockenspiel, woodblock, claves, triangle, temple blocks, chimes, tam-tam, ratchet, slide whistle)
- 1 keyboard (piano, celesta)
- 1 guitar (electric, Spanish, mandolin)
- 12 strings
  7 violins
  4 celli
  1 contrabass
- Total: 31 players

Phantom Of The Opera (orchestration according to The Really Useful Group, the company that holds the license)

- Woodwind 1 (Piccolo/Flute)
- Woodwind 2 (Flute/Clarinet)
- Woodwind 3 (Oboe/Cor anglais)
- Woodwind 4 (E-flat clarinet/B♭ Clarinet/Bass clarinet)
- Woodwind 5 (Bassoon)
- 3 French horns
- 2 Trumpets
- Trombone
- Percussionist
- 2 Keyboards
- Harp
- Violins (7 recommended)
- Violas (2 recommended)
- Cello (2 recommended)
- Contrabass
- Total: 27 Players

Jesus Christ Superstar (orchestration according to Concord Theatricals, the company that holds the license)

- Woodwind (B♭ Clarinet/Flute/Tenor sax)
- Horn
- Trumpet
- Keyboard 1
- Keyboard 2
- Keyboard 3
- Percussion
- Guitar 1
- Guitar 2
- Bass (Electric)
- Drums
- Total: 11 players (though other orchestrations are available, notably the symphonic version and the 5-piece rock combo version)

On The Town (orchestration according to Concord Theatricals, the company that holds the license)

- 1 Flute
- 1 Oboe
- 3 Clarinets 1,2&3
- 2 Horns 1&2
- 3 Trumpets 1,2&3
- 3 Trombones 1,2&3
- 1 Piano
- 2 Percussion 1&2
- 3 Violin
- 1 Viola
- 1 Cello
- 1 Bass
- Total: 22 Players

Guys and Dolls (orchestration according to Music Theatre International, the company that holds the license)

- 6 Strings
  2 Violin A-C
  2 Violin B-D
  1 Cello
  1 Bass
- Reed I (Alto Saxophone, Clarinet, Flute, Piccolo)
- Reed II (Alto Saxophone, Clarinet, Flute)
- Reed III (Clarinet, English Horn, Oboe, Tenor Saxophone)
- Reed IV (Clarinet, Tenor Saxophone)
- Reed V (Baritone Saxophone, Bass Clarinet)
- 3 Trumpets
- 1 Horn
- 1 Trombone
- 1 Percussion
- 1 Piano/Celesta
- Total: 17 Players

Godspell (original orchestration according to Music Theatre International, the company that holds the license)

- Keyboard/conductor
- Bass
- Drums
- 2 Guitars
- 1 Guitarist that can also play an additional Keyboard, if necessary
- Total players: 4 players

All Shook Up (orchestration according to Theatrical Rights Worldwide, the company that holds the license)

- Piano/conductor
- Reed 1 (Flute, alto sax)
- Reed 2 (Clarinet, tenor sax)
- Reed 3 (Baritone sax, bass clarinet)
- Trumpet 1
- Trumpet 2
- Trombone
- Organ (usually played on a keyboard)
- Guitar 1
- Guitar 2
- Bass
- Drums
- Total players: 12 players

1776 (orchestration according to Music Theatre International, the company that holds the license)

The score was orchestrated by Eddie Sauter.

- 6 Strings
  2 Violins
  2 Violas
  1 Cello
  1 Bass
- Reed I (Clarinet, Flute, Piccolo)
- Reed II (Clarinet, Flute)
- Reed III (Clarinet, Oboe, English Horn)
- Reed IV (Bassoon)
- 3 Trombones
- 2 Trumpets
- 2 Horns
- 1 Keyboard (Harpsichord, Organ)
- 1 Harp
- 2 Percussion
- Total: 21 Players

A New Brain (orchestration according to Concord Theatricals, the company that holds the license)

- Piano/conductor
- Synthesizer
- Drums/percussion
- Reed (Alto Saxophone, Clarinet, Oboe, English Horn, Piccolo, Soprano Saxophone, Flute)
- Horn
- Cello
- Bass
- Total: 7 players

== See also ==
- Benshi
