= The Groggers =

American Jewish pop punk band

- Origin: Queens, New York, US
- Genres: Jewish rock; alternative rock; pop punk; comedy rock
- Years active: 2010–2012(hiatus); 2012–2015 (hiatus); 2023–present
- Past members: L.E. Doug Staiman; Ari Friedman; Taylor Carroll; Addison Scott; Drew Salzman; C.J. Glass; Yisroel Reches; Josh Koperwas; Chemy Soibelman
- Website: thegroggers.wix.com

The Groggers is an American Jewish pop punk band from Queens, New York. Formed in 2010 by lead singer L.E. Doug Staiman, they are known for their satirical, often controversial songs dealing with a variety of Jewish issues.

Initially gaining fame with their single and music video "Get", the band released their debut album, There's No 'I' in Cherem, on August 29, 2011. They received national attention, as well as controversy, with their 2012 video for "Jewcan Sam", produced with plastic surgeon Dr. Michael Salzhauer.

== History ==
=== Formation and There's No "I" in Cherem (2010–2011) ===
Lead singer L.E. Doug Staiman and guitarist Ari Friedman attended Yeshiva University and Queens College together and bonded over their shared music tastes. They were briefly in a classic rock cover band called Steel Eagle. When Staiman moved back to New York City in 2008 after studying in yeshiva in Israel, he was introduced to the local Jewish music scene through a friend. This inspired him to write and record several satirical Jewish punk songs.

When he was told the songs were too niche to be successful, Staiman, as a joke, made a low-budget music video for one of the songs, "Get", hiring a pickup band to play and film school student Farrell Goldsmith to direct. The band was named The Groggers, after the traditional Jewish noisemaker. Released in early 2010, the video became a surprise viral hit and became popular among agunah activists, convincing Staiman to make "The Groggers" an official band shortly afterward.

Later in 2010, a second video, "Eishes Chayil", was released, featuring a cameo from Orthodox musician Rav Shmuel. This was followed by two more videos, "The Shidduch Hits the Fan" and "Upper West Side Story", both satirizing the Jewish dating scene. The band released its debut album, There's No "I" in Cherem, on August 29, 2011.

=== Non-album releases (2011–2015) ===
In December 2011, the band released the songs "Anonymous Girl" (referencing an article written by an anonymous girl from Stern College) and "View From the Sink", which responded to Jewish reggae artist Matisyahu shaving his beard from the perspective of the shorn hair.

In February 2012, the band released a new single, "Jewcan Sam", subtitled "A Nose Job Love Story". The video, commissioned by plastic surgeon Dr. Michael Salzhauer, became the subject of widespread controversy and criticism due to its portrayal of rhinoplasty and accusations of playing into antisemitic tropes. The following month, the band performed at the Gramercy Theatre in Manhattan.

They also told The Commentator that "Jewcan Sam" was meant to be the lead single for an upcoming second album, with Staiman saying it would be "a more mature album for us with a bit more of a universal appeal....Our goal is to maintain our identity as a band but begin to cater to a larger audience in the process.”

Staiman announced in May that the band would be going on hiatus, and that he would be moving to Los Angeles to pursue a solo career. The following summer, however, the band released new material with "Mindy", a satirical love song directed at then-New York State Senate candidate Mindy Meyer.

In late 2014 and early 2015, the band released a lyric video for a new single called "Kicked Outta Yeshiva", as well as music videos for "Not Going to Shacharis" and "JAP". "Not Going to Shacharis", co-written with Aryeh Kunstler, was given a video featuring cameos from Kosha Dillz, Mendy Pellin, and Etan G of Shlock Rock. The "JAP" video, another collaboration with Salzhauer, was originally released on May 6, 2015, only to be removed due to "numerous legal complications", according to the band. The video was re-uploaded a month later.

Following another hiatus period, during which Staiman and the other members pursued various projects, the band resurfaced in January 2023 with social media posts teasing a new single. The song, "Tiniest Man in the Mikvah", was released on February 1, with a music video featuring comedian Elon Gold.

In February 2024, the Groggers released a single, "I'm Just a Yid", a parody of Simple Plan's "I'm Just a Kid" about the October 7 attacks and the rise in Antisemitism during the Gaza war.

== Musical style ==
In an article for Heeb magazine, blogger Heshy Fried praised The Groggers as "possibly the first Orthodox Jewish band that doesn't sound Jewish," comparing their sound to that of MxPx and New Found Glory. Influences cited by the band include Green Day, Avenged Sevenfold, Nirvana, Sum 41, All Time Low, Motion City Soundtrack, and The Ramones, with Staiman saying of the latter band, "I'd be out of a job without them."

== Band members ==
=== Final lineup ===
- L.E. Doug Staiman – lead vocals, guitar (2010–2012, 2012–2015)
- Ari Friedman – lead guitar, backing vocals (2010–2012, 2012–2015)
- Taylor Carroll – bass, vocals (2014–2015)
- Addison Scott – drums (2014–2015)

=== Past members ===
- Drew Salzman – drums (2012–2014)
- Josh Koperwas – bass (2012–2014)
- Yisroel Reches – drums (2012)
- C.J. Glass – bass (2010–2011)
- Chemy Soibelman – drums (2010–2012)

== Discography ==
=== Albums ===
- There's No 'I' in Cherem (August 29, 2011)

=== Singles and music videos ===
Released	Song	Director	Album
2010	"Get"	Farrell Goldsmith	There's No 'I' in Cherem
2010	"Eishes Chayil"	Farrell Goldsmith, L.E. Doug Staiman	There's No 'I' in Cherem
2011	"Upper West Side Story"	Farrell Goldsmith, Chaim Berkowitz	There's No 'I' in Cherem
2011	"The Shidduch Hits the Fan"	Farrell Goldsmith, Chaim Berkowitz	There's No 'I' in Cherem
2011	"Anonymous Girl"		non-album single
2011	"View From the Sink"	Lyric video	non-album single
2012	"Jewcan Sam"	Farrell Goldsmith	Unreleased second album
2012	"Mindy"	Yoni Oscherowitz	non-album single
2014	"Not Going to Shacharis"	L.E. Doug Staiman, Mike Schultz	Unreleased second album
2014	"Kicked Outta Yeshiva"	Lyric video	Unreleased second album
2015	"JAP"	Jordan Stauber	Unreleased second album
2023	"Tiniest Man in the Mikvah"	Mo Weiss	
