= Pickup group =

Musicians hired for a limited period

A pickup group is a group of professional musicians, which may be session musicians, who are hired to play for a limited time period—ranging from a single concert or sound recording session to several weeks of shows—before disbanding. Pickup groups are formed to play in pit orchestras for musical theatre performances, operas, or operettas, accompany jazz singers or instrumental soloists, and act as a temporary backup band for a pop singer for a tour. As well, pickup groups are hired to perform at social events such as weddings or holiday parties. The size of these ensembles ranges from a three- or four-member rock ensemble or jazz group (e.g., a rhythm section, organ trio or backing band) or classical chamber ensemble (e.g., a string quartet) to a 20-piece jazz big band, a 20-27 member pit orchestra for a Broadway musical or a 30-100 member orchestra.

== Terminology ==
A pickup group may also be called a "pickup band", "pick-up group", "pickup orchestra", or "jobbing band".

== History ==
In the 1960s, recordings of New York soul singers were not typically backed up by longstanding "house bands" which worked on a permanent basis for the record label, as was the case in many Southern US types of soul music. Instead, New York soul accompaniment parts were usually recorded by session musicians who were hired by a music contractor to play for a single recording. Since the musicians playing New York soul were not a regular backup band that played together all the time, the playing was not as loose and spontaneous as a typical Southern US "house band", in which the members played together all the time. Nevertheless, since the NYC session players were experienced musicians, they played with a professional style.

== Considerations ==
When a music promoter is organizing a multi-city or multi-country tour for a lead singer or solo instrumentalist (e.g., a solo guitar player or solo flute player), she or he needs to hire accompaniment musicians to play the chords, bassline and harmony parts which are used to support the lead performer. Similarly, if a touring Broadway musical group is performing a series of shows in cities across a country or around the world (e.g., several weeks of shows in each location), the organizer needs a pit orchestra to accompany the singers who are performing.

The promoter needs to make a decision as to whether to hire an existing, longstanding music ensemble, backing band or orchestra or hire a "pick-up group" in each city or country. There are advantages and disadvantages to each approach. Using a longstanding ensemble will provide a group which has extensive experience performing as a musical ensemble. This can help the group to play with a more unified sound and style. If the backing band or backing ensemble required for a show is small (e.g., 3-4 musicians), it may be worth the cost of paying for the travel, hotel and food for a longstanding group. However, if the backing ensemble is large–for example, a 20-piece big band for a jazz singer or a 27-member pit orchestra for a travelling musical, the cost of travel, hotels and meals for the backup group may be prohibitive.

Alternatively, in each town or city, the producer or promoter can pay a local music contractor to hire a local musicians to form a "pickup" orchestra or a "jobbing band". If a promoter decides to hire a pickup group in each town or city, this means that the promoter does not have to pay for the travel, hotels and meals for these musicians, since they live in the town or city where the show is taking place. There are some disadvantages; using a pickup group requires contractors to pay for a series of rehearsals for the new musicians in each town, so that they can learn the songs/pieces. As well, since the pickup group will not have experience playing together and since they may not have experience performing the songs/pieces in the show, a pickup group may not play with the same "tight" ensemble as a longstanding group which backs up a soloist or musical theatre/opera company on a permanent basis.

== As occupation ==
Although the work provided by these ensembles is intermittent and of short duration, these ensembles are an important source of income for freelance musicians and session musicians. Since playing in "jobbing bands" and "pickup groups" only provides a limited amount of work per year, a performer that plays in these types of groups will typically have to have other sources of income, such as teaching music on her instrument. As well, playing in these ensembles give local performers an opportunity to work with well-known national- or international-level touring soloists and conductors.

== Orchestras ==
When a musical theater production, operetta, or opera is performed in different cities, the production company may hire local musicians in each town for the performance.

== Jazz, rock and pop music groups ==
When a jazz singer or instrumental soloist, pop singer(s) or a rock musical production that is accompanied by a rock band, pop group or jazz group is on tour, they may hire a band of local musicians (e.g. a horn section or additional rhythm section members) in each town that they play in. In some cases, the singer, soloist or production will have a core few musicians that travels with them, such as a piano player, who also acts as a bandleader (or a violin concertmaster for an orchestra) for the performances. The core group that travels from town to town may include the essential instruments of a rhythm section: a musician playing a chordal instrument (electric guitar, piano, Hammond organ, etc.), a bassist (electric bass or double bass) and a drummer. Additional rhythm section members (additional chordal instrument, additional percussionists, etc.) can be hired in each new town or city to add to this core group and provide a fuller sound. Some singers may also hire a small pickup string orchestra in each town that they play in, to perform backing string arrangements.
