= Dr. Miami =

American celebrity doctor who practices plastic surgery (born 1972)

Michael Salzhauer
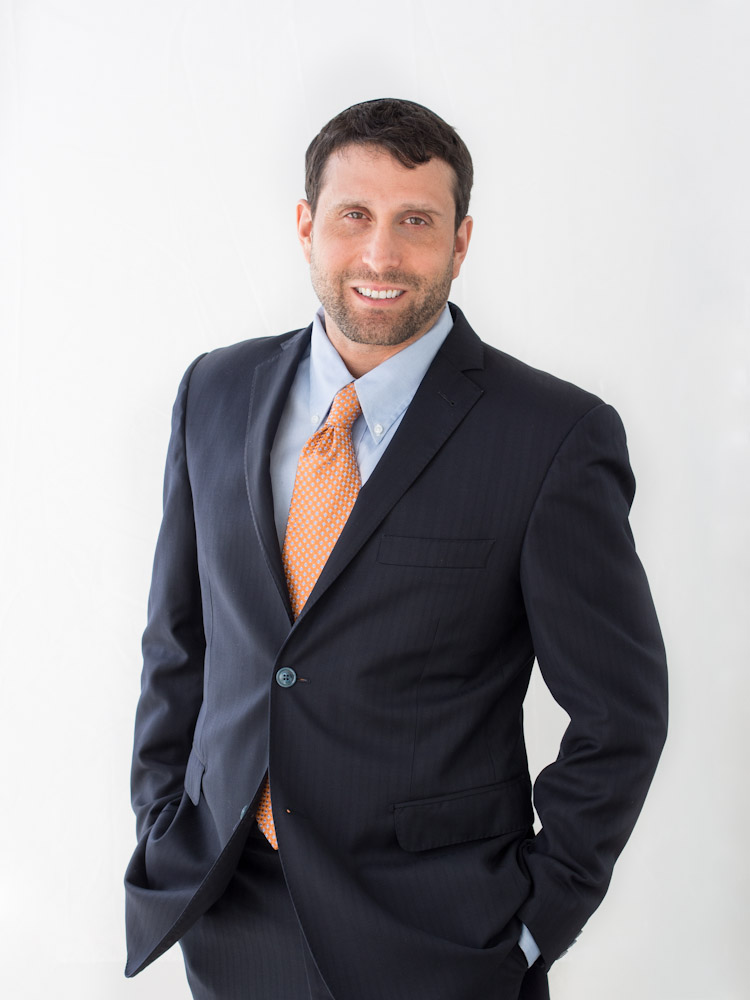
- Born: April 16, 1972 (age 54); New York City, U.S.
- Other name: Dr. Miami
- Education: Washington University School of Medicine (MD)
- Occupation: Plastic Surgeon
- Spouse: Eva Zafira Zion (m. 1995)

Michael Salzhauer (born April 16, 1972) is an American celebrity doctor who practices plastic surgery. He is active on social media as Dr. Miami and has been on reality television. Salzhauer runs a plastic surgery practice in Bay Harbor Islands, Florida.

== Early life and education ==
At the outbreak of World War I in 1914, Salzhauer's grandfather's family fled Ukraine and pogroms there; his great-grandfather was clubbed to death by a Cossack as the family left. When the Nazis came to power in 1933, his grandfather moved to Mandatory Palestine, and Salzhauer's father was born in Tel Aviv. His father moved to New York City in 1958, where Salzhauer was born and grew up.

Salzhauer went to a public high school, where he was teased over the shape of his nose, and he left and went to the Frisch School, a Jewish high school. He then attended Rockland Community College from 1989 to 1990 before transferring to Brooklyn College. After two years he transferred to Washington University School of Medicine in St. Louis, Missouri.

After graduating, Salzhauer did his residency at first at Mount Sinai Medical Center in Miami in general surgery, then at Jackson Memorial Hospital in Miami for plastic surgery, then did further training in plastic surgery at Cleveland Clinic Florida in Weston, Florida. The other residents performed a rhinoplasty on Salzhauer as a gift for the completion of his residency, in addition to a chin implant and liposuction.

== Career ==
In 2003, Salzhauer opened his own practice in Bal Harbour, Florida, and six years later moved to a new five-story building there. He told a reporter for Miami New Times in 2012, that "marketing makes the world go 'round,'" and that he courted the publicity of controversy.

Salzhauer authored a children's book in 2008 titled My Beautiful Mother, which focused on a young girl whose mother undergoes a tummy tuck, a nose job, and breast augmentation. Salzhauer and the book were criticized for promoting elective cosmetic surgery and for a line that suggests that mother's new nose will "be prettier." Child psychologist Elizabeth Berger has noted that while an explanatory book will be helpful for children, it "can be difficult for small kids to understand." Salzhauer defended the book, saying that he wrote it to help parents explain such surgeries to their children.

My Beautiful Mother
- Author: Michael Salzhauer
- Illustrator: Victor Guiza
- Language: English
- Subject: Plastic surgery
- Genre: Children's literature
- Publisher: Big Tent Books
- Publication date: 2008
- Publication place: United States
- ISBN: 1-60131-032-3
- OCLC: 226356256

In 2009, Salzhauer published a virtual plastic surgery iPhone application that allowed users to tweak photographs of themselves to simulate operations. The New York Times commented that the results were "worthy of a fun-house mirror."

In 2012, Salzhauer caused controversy within the Orthodox Jewish community after producing a video titled "Jewcan Sam" with the Jewish punk band The Groggers. The video features a young Jewish man who undergoes rhinoplasty at the request of his girlfriend. The American Society of Plastic Surgeons initiated an ethics investigation as a result, and both Salzhauer and the band were accused of playing into Jewish stereotypes.

Salzhauer is also active on social media posting under his nickname "Dr. Miami." Apart from using Instagram and Twitter, the surgeon is also active on Snapchat's story mode, where he posts videos of cosmetic surgeries. As of 2016, he had around a million followers on Snapchat. Salzhauer is also active on TikTok, where he has 2.7 million followers as of 2023.

In 2016, Salzhauer was nominated for the eighth annual Shorty Award in the Snapchatter of the year category. He came in second place, losing to DJ Khaled. That same year, WE TV announced a reality television series, Dr. Miami, starring Salzhauer. The series premiered on March 31, 2017, and ran for six episodes on WE TV.

In 2017, Salzhauer and recording artist Adam Barta released a song called "Flawless". The song reached #24 on the Billboard dance/electronic digital chart, #9 on iTunes dance singles chart, and #32 on the Billboard hot club dance chart.

In 2020, Salzhauer's documentary, They Call Me Dr. Miami (directed by Jean-Simon Chartier from Québec) was released on Discovery+.

In 2025, a start-up venture co-founded by Salzhauer, Bliss Aesthetics, raised $17.5 million to bring artificial intelligence to cosmetic surgery. The company was founded to use AI to connect patients with plastic surgeons and visualize potential results for cosmetic procedures. Salzhauer assumed the position of Chief Medical Officer.
