= The White Screen =

Israeli pop band

The White Screen המסך הלבן
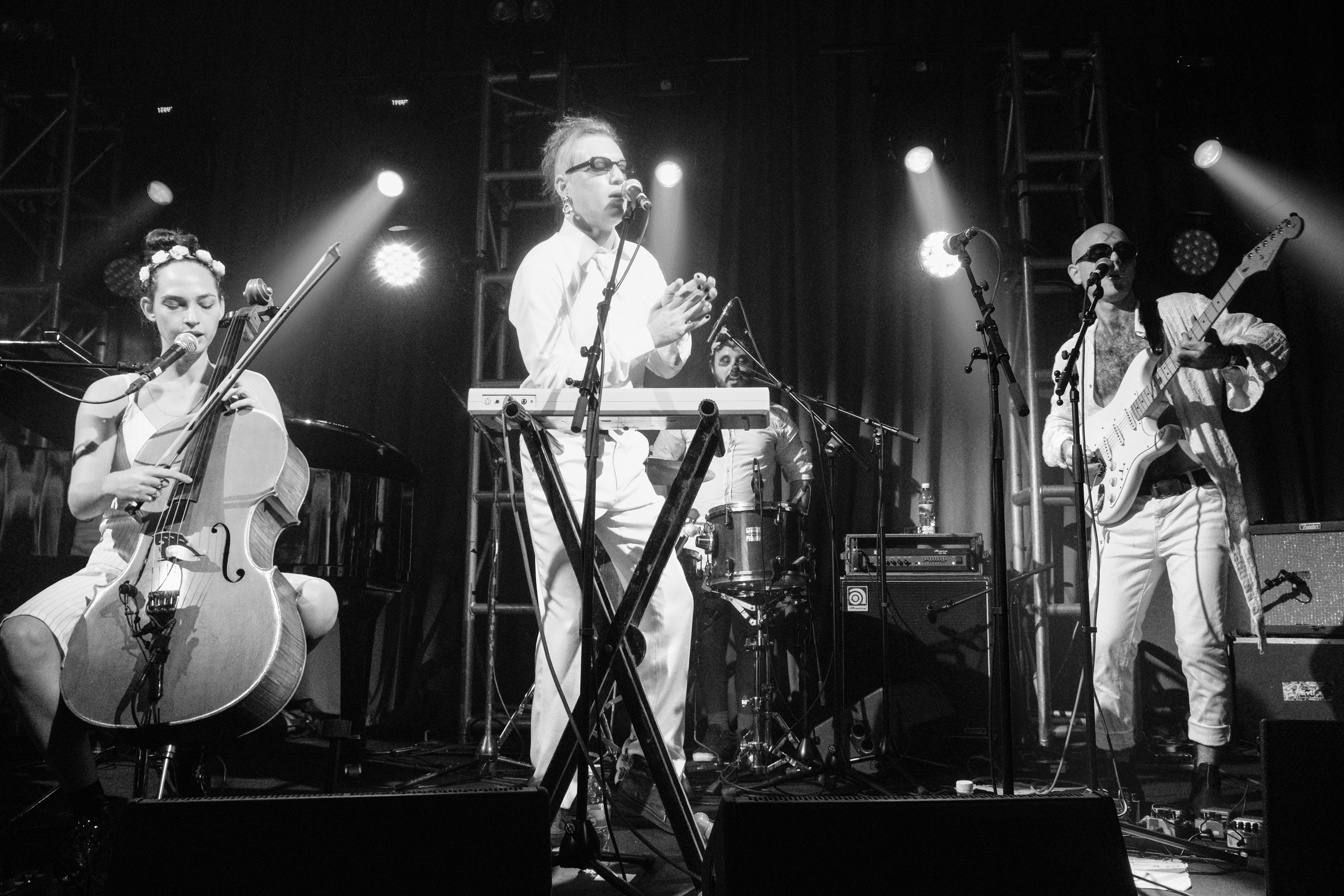
- The White Screen in 2017

Background information
- Origin: Tel Aviv, Israel
- Years active: 2016-present
- Label: Garzen Records / Indie
- Members: Gabriel Broid; Gilbert Broid; Noa Ayali (cello, Vocals); Nimshi; Udi Naor
- Past members: Stav Ben Shahar
- Website: https://www.whitescreenmusic.com/

The White Screen (Hebrew: המסך הלבן) is an Israeli indie pop-rock cult band . The band consists of cousins Gabriel and Gilbert Broid, Noa Ayali, Nimshi, Udi Naor and former drummer Stav Ben Shahar. The band has been described as a retro 1980s, punk band.

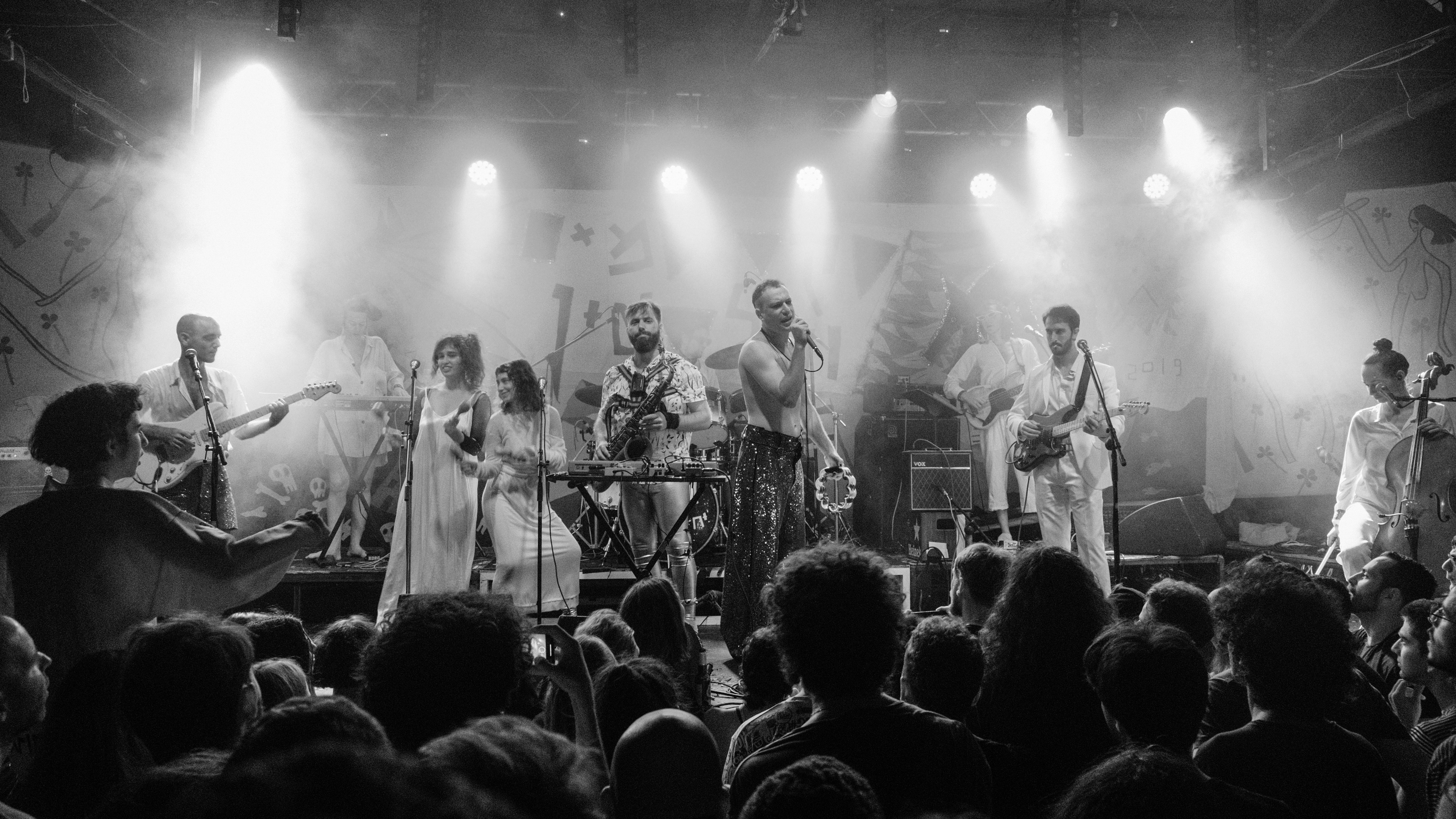
The White Screen, September 2019

== History ==
We were standing in traffic and this song was written through a burst of consciousness. It's as though all of the saints buried in Jerusalem awakened in our soul and wrote it. It's as though our bodies were a vessel of 2,000 year-old messages.

— Gabriel Broid talks about the song "Jerusalem" in an interview for Ynet, 2019

Gabriel Broid was born in the United States and later moved to Brussels. At age ten, he moved to Israel. His cousin, Gilbert, was born in Jerusalem. As teenagers the two used to dress up and imitate the musicians which they admired.

In a 2019 interview, lead singer Gabriel Broid described that their song "Jerusalem" came to him while riding on the 480 bus from Jerusalem to Tel Aviv.

== Musical influences ==
The White Screen has noted Lou Reed, Velvet Underground and David Bowie as some of their musical influences. They have also stated that they loved Glam Rock.

== Personnel ==
=== Members ===
- Gabriel Broid (vocals)
- Gilbert Broid (guitar)
- Stav Ben Shahar (drums)

== Discography ==
- The White Screen (2016)
- Death to Techno (2018)
- Sex, Drugs & Palestine (2019)
- Close to the sun (2024)
