= L.E. Doug Staiman =

L.E. Staiman
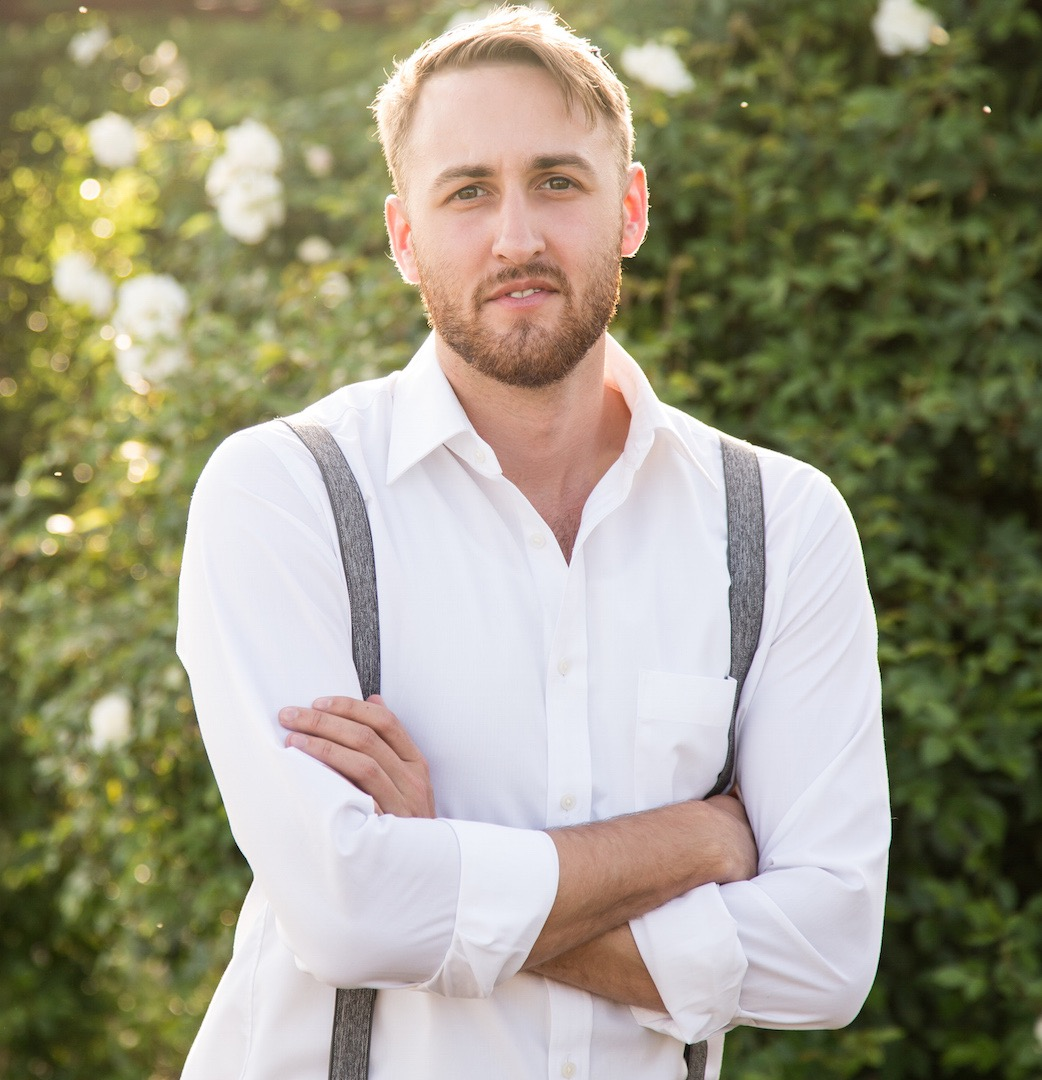

Background information
- Also known as: L.E. Doug Staiman
- Born: Eli Noah Staiman; 1987 or 1988; Binghamton, New York
- Origin: Los Angeles, California
- Genres: Jewish rock, pop punk, alternative rock, parody
- Occupation(s): Singer, songwriter, guitarist, music and film producer, comedian, director, actor, screenwriter
- Instrument(s): Vocals, guitar, drums, piano, bass
- Years active: 2005–present
- Spouse: Esti Staiman

Eliyahu Noah "Eli" Staiman, professionally known as L.E. Doug Staiman or simply L.E. Staiman, is an American musician, actor, comedian, and filmmaker. He was the frontman and founder of the Jewish pop punk band The Groggers, which he formed with guitarist Ari Friedman in 2010. Outside of The Groggers, he has performed with artists including Aryeh Kunstler, Benny Friedman, and Dave Days, and released several solo singles, including with the short-lived duo 3 Day Yuntif. In addition to music he has pursued filmmaking, directing music videos and comedy sketches for various YouTubers and making his feature film directorial debut in 2022 with Love Virtually, starring Cheri Oteri, Stephen Tobolowsky, and Paul F. Tompkins.

== Early life ==
Staiman was born in Binghamton, New York. His family moved several times during his childhood, with Staiman attending day school at Talmudical Academy of Baltimore and Rabbi Alexander S. Gross Hebrew Academy in Miami, Florida; he later studied at Yeshivas Ner Yaakov in Israel. After returning to America, he graduated from Touro College.

== Career ==
=== The Groggers ===
One of Staiman's early bands performed at Yeshiva University's Battle of the Bands, where he met guitarist Ari Friedman, then an undergraduate at the school. The two were later reintroduced at Queens College and briefly played together in a classic rock cover band called Steel Eagle. In 2010, Staiman recruited Friedman and several other musicians to film a video for a song he had written called "Get". After the video became a minor viral hit, Staiman officially assembled the group as The Groggers. Their debut album, There's No 'I' in Cherem, was released on August 29, 2011.

For the band's 2012 video "Jewcan Sam", Staiman received rhinoplasty from the video's co-producer, Miami plastic surgeon Dr. Michael Salzhauer. Following the song's release and subsequent controversy, the band went on a brief hiatus, during which Staiman moved to Los Angeles and pursued a solo career. However, the band returned later in the year with a song called "Mindy". Despite releasing three more singles from a planned second album, the album never materialized and the band has been inactive since 2015.

=== Other music ===
Prior to forming The Groggers, Staiman was a longtime member of Aryeh Kunstler's touring band, the Aryeh Kunstler Band (AKB). Since 2012, Staiman has released a number of singles as a solo artist. He contributed guitar to Benny Friedman's 2015 single "Toda!", appearing in the video alongside Groggers bandmates Drew Salzman and Addison Scott. The same year, Staiman and Ira Silver formed the Jewish pop duo 3 Day Yuntif, who released their debut single, "Thank God It's Shabbos (TGIS)". In 2016, he collaborated with YouTuber Dave Days on a mashup of Adele's "Hello" and Foo Fighters' "Everlong". In 2018, Staiman released a new single, "Ghosted", as well as a cover of 5 Seconds of Summer's "Lie to Me".

=== Web content ===
In addition to his own music, Staiman has also written, produced, and directed several music videos for other musicians, primarily on YouTube. These include Avery, Taylor Carroll, Bart Baker, Dave Days, Noey Jacobson and The Groggers themselves. He appeared in a 2014 BuzzFeed video entitled "Jews Decorate Christmas Trees For The First Time". In 2017, Staiman directed and co-wrote "Find Your Song", a music video promoting Shalhevet High School that featured student and Gotham actor David Mazouz. As of 2017, he was the official cameraman and editor for Mayim Bialik's YouTube channel. As of February 2024, he plays a character on X named Lyle Culpepper, an uninformed pro-Palestine activist.

=== Film and TV ===
Staiman has had several small acting roles, beginning with a 2013 appearance on Brand X with Russell Brand as a pedophile name Morry Urple. He co-wrote and co-produced with director Zach Zorba Grashin the 2021 horror film Knifecop, starring Kane Hodder. He is set to make his directorial debut in 2022 with the film Love Virtually, which he also produced and co-wrote with Cheston Mizel and which stars Cheri Oteri, Stephen Tobolowsky, and Paul F. Tompkins.

== Discography ==
=== With The Groggers ===
- There's No 'I' in Cherem (2011)

=== With 3 Day Yuntif ===
- "Thank God It's Shabbos (TGIS)" (single) (2015)

=== Solo singles ===
- "West" (2012)
- "Like Crazy" (2014)
- "The Rabbi's Daughter" (2015)
- "I Like U" (2015)
- "Bli Neder" (2015)
- "The Outcome" (2016)
- "Ghosted" (2018)
- "Lie to Me" (5 Seconds of Summer cover) (2018)

=== Other credits ===
- 2013: ScrobageTV, "Work Witch" (Halloween parody of "Work Bitch" by Britney Spears) – producer, lyrics, vocals
- 2014: Benny Friedman, "Toda!" – guitar
- 2015: Carli J. Myers, "All the King's Horses" – producer
- 2016: Dave Days, "Adele/Foo Fighters Mash Up" – guest vocals, guitar, drums
- 2016: Carli J. Myers, "Walls" – producer, composer
- 2019: Dove, "Send Me A Love" – recording

== Filmography ==
=== Film ===
Year	Title	Actor	Director	Writer	Producer	Editor	Notes
2019	Ohr (Light)					check	Documentary
2020	Alive in the Darkness	check					Role: Scientist; Short film
2021	Knifecorp	check		check	check		Role: "News Reporter:
2022	Love Virtually	check	check	check	check		Role: Kalvin; Directorial debut
TBA	Like and Subscribe	check					Role: Reeves Alcott

=== Web and TV ===
- 2013: Fantar the Fantastic (webseries) – editor, cinematographer

==== Acting ====
- 2013: Brand X with Russell Brand (Episode: "Show 16") – Morry Urple
- 2014: Bart Baker, "Magic! - Rude Parody" – Magic! drummer
- 2014: Bart Baker, "Maroon 5 - Animals Parody" – Maroon 5 Bandmate
- 2014: The Walking Deader (short) – Dickless Fence Zombie
- 2015: Bart Baker, "Maroon 5 - Sugar Parody" – Maroon 5 Bandmate

=== Music videos ===
Year	Song	Artist	Credit	Notes
2010	"Eishes Chayil"	The Groggers	Director, producer, writer, editor (with Farrell Goldsmith and Chaim Berkowitz)	Own band; second single from There's No 'I' in Cherem.
2011	"Spread the Light"	The Avoda	Director (with Aryeh Kunstler)	Hanukkah single
2013	"Not My Style"	Taylor Carroll	Director	
2013	"Burn"	Avery	Director	Ellie Goulding cover
2013	"Wake Me Up"	Avery	Director	Avicii cover
2013	"Wrecking Ball"	Jamie Charoen	Director, editor	Miley Cyrus cover
2013	"Made in the USA	Jamie Charoen	Director, editor	Demi Lovato cover
2013	"No Escapin'"	Manou	Director	
2014	"Shake It Off"	Jamie Charoen	Director, editor	Taylor Swift cover
2014	"Am I Wrong/Rather Be"	Noey Jacobson	Director, music producer	Nico and Vinz/Clean Bandit mashup
2014	"A Sky Full of Stars"	Noey Jacobson	Director, music producer	Coldplay rap cover
2014	"Tell Me"	Noey Jacobson	Video producer	
2014	"Cool Kids and Heroes"	Noey Jacobson	Director, music producer	Mashup of songs by Sam Smith, Echosmith, Tove Lo, U2, and Avicii
2014	"Not Going to Shacharis"	The Groggers	Director (with Mike Schultz)	
2016	"Me, Myself & I Response"	Noey Jacobson	Music and video producer	Remix of song by G-Eazy and Bebe Rexha
2016	"One Call Away Mashup"	Noey Jacobson	Music and video producer	Mashup of songs by Charlie Puth, Drake, Adele, Marvin Gaye, Maroon 5, and Carly Rae Jepsen.
2016	"Oxygen"	Noey Jacobson	Music and video producer	
2016	"Vehi She'amda"	Noey Jacobson	Music and video producer	Shwekey cover
2016	"One Dance (King David Remix)"	Noey Jacobson	Music producer	Remix of song by Drake
