= Beer7 =

Israeli Ska punk band

Beer 7 ביר7
- Origin: Be'er Sheva, Israel
- Genres: Ska punk, punk rock
- Years active: 2002–2010
- Labels: Ra records Indy
- Members: Dafna Arad; Guy Drory; Raz Lahav; Dudu Rozen
- Past members: Michael Lupu; Raz Lahav
- Website: www.myspace.com/beer7

Beer7 (Hebrew: ביר7) is a Ska punk band from Be'er Sheva, Israel. The name is a shortened version of the city's name – Sheva is Hebrew for seven. The band was formed in 2001, and recorded its first album in 2003. The album Skandal was distributed by an indie label named "Ra records". It was sold out and later uploaded online.

Beer7 performs all over Israel, in punk festivals, clubs and pubs. They performed with Israeli bands Useless ID, Sartan HaShad, Kuku Bloff veHayetushim, Beat 69, and the Australian band Yidcore.

Beer7's music video for the Operation Ivy tribute The Radio's Not a Friend reached 1st place on the Israeli music video channel, Music 24.

The band released second album, "Birat Ha'Negev" in 2010.

== Line-up ==
- Dafna Arad – vocals
- Dudu Rosen – guitar
- Alon Ziv – bass
- Guy Drory – drums
- Oded Ben Itzhak – saxophone

=== Former members ===
- Raz Lahav – bass
- Michael Lupu – bass

== Beer7 in the Israeli punk scene ==
There were few women on stage in Israeli punk rock shows before Beer7's Dafna Arad. This started a whole girl scene that includes bands like Va'adat Kishut, Phoney Pony, and CUBAN B, all girl-fronted.

== Discography ==
=== Skandal (2003) ===
No.	Title	Length
1.	"Beer sheva (באר שבע)"	02:48
2.	"סקא זה רע"	01:43
3.	"Sameach (שמייח)"	02:18
4.	"Dany roop (דני רופ)"	01:58
5.	"Moak (מועק)"	01:58
6.	"sk8 is gr8"	02:47
7.	"spike gar be neot lon (ספייק גר בנאות לון)"	03:12
8.	"Radio lo chaver (הרדיו כבר לא חבר)"	02:08
9.	"betula from sdom (הבתולה מסדום)"	02:12

=== No Space (2010) ===
No.	Title	Length
1.	"7 beer bottles (שבע בירות)"	01:57
2.	"A pig in answer (חזיר בתשובה)"	02:24
3.	"anti shanti (אנטי שנטי)"	02:08
4.	"chicks for a NIS (פרגיות בשקל)"	02:02
5.	"Antennas (אנטנות)"	02:26
6.	"My mom killed the punk (אמא שלי רצחה את הפאנק)"	03:13
7.	"en mc"	02:38
8.	"Emo Kid (ילד אימו)"	02:58
9.	"sk8-is-gr8-ii"	02:18
10.	"sars (סאר"ס)"	02:51
11.	"hummus (חומוס)"	01:24
12.	"ghosts (רוחות רפאים)"	02:39
13.	"rinat (רינת)"	01:45
