= Deaf Chonky =

Israeli folk/garage/punk rock duo

Deaf Chonky דף צ'ונקי
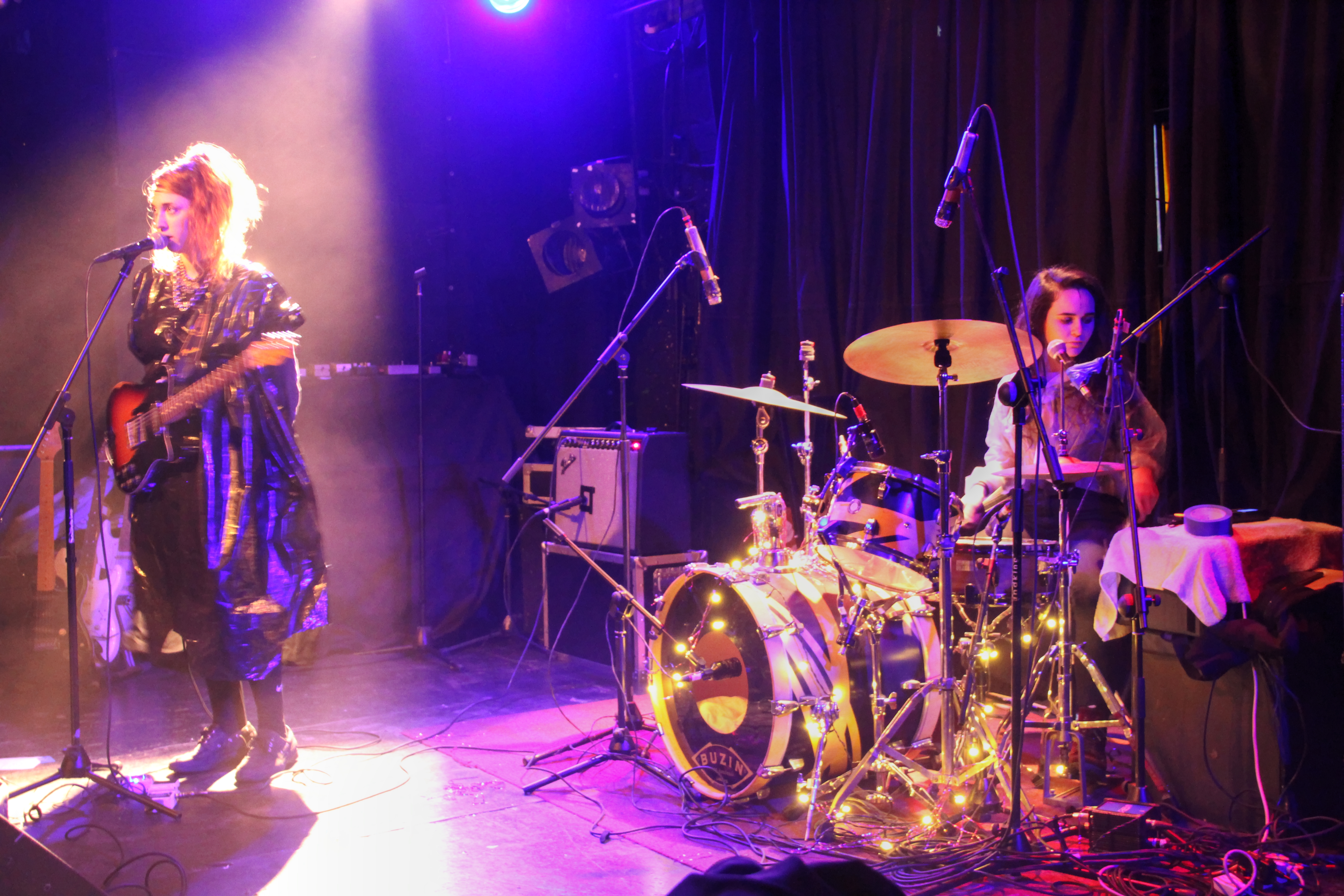
- Deaf Chonky, 2017

Background information
- Origin: Rehovot, Israel
- Genres: Garage rock; garage punk; punk rock; folk punk
- Members: Adi Bronicki; Tami Kaminsky; Tom Mckinna

Deaf Chonky (Hebrew: דף צ'ונקי) is an Israeli folk, garage, punk rock duo. The band members are Adi Bronicki, Tami Kaminsky and Tom Mckinna.

== Early years ==
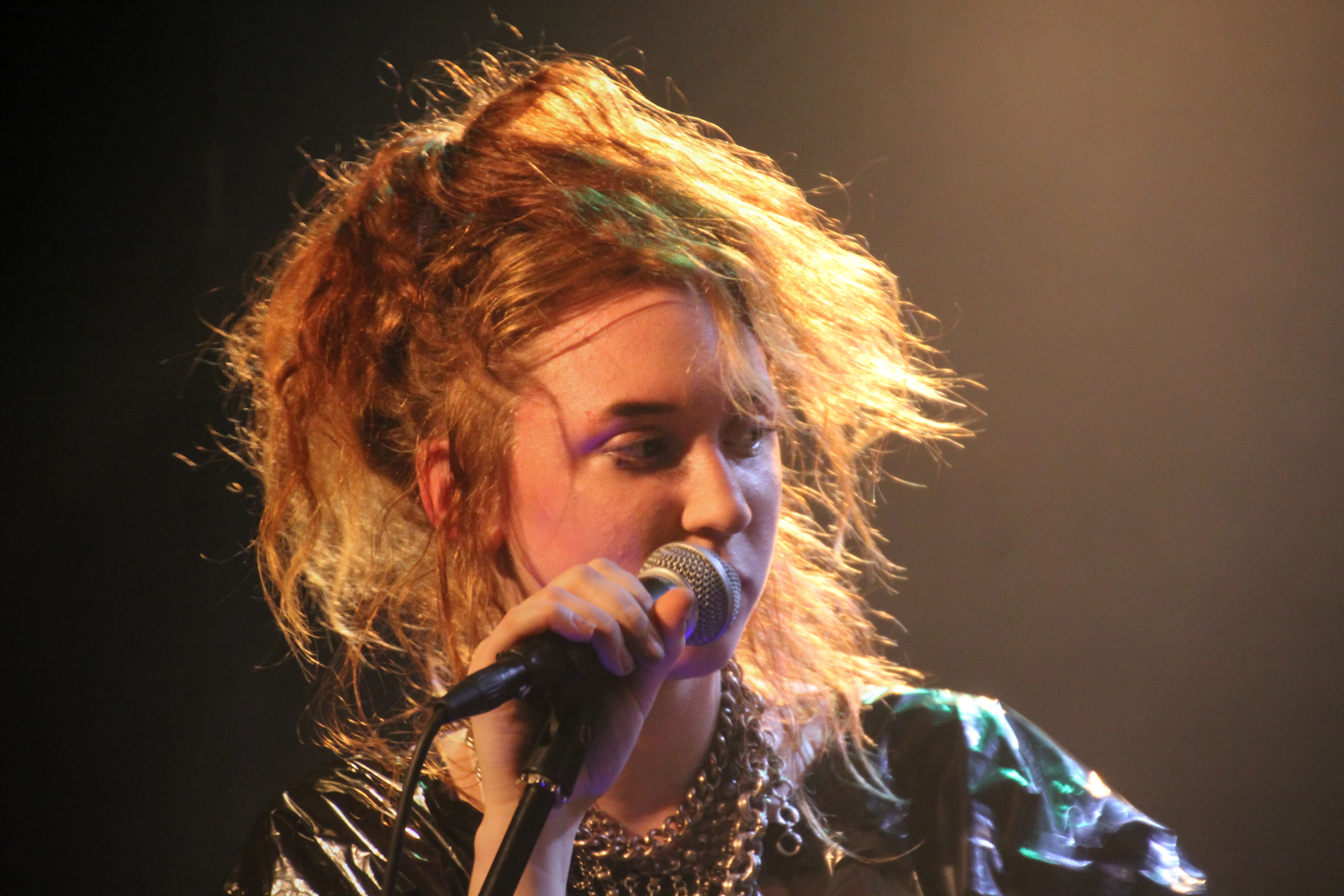
Deaf Chonky's Adi Bronicki at a performance in 2017

The two members of Deaf Chonky grew up in Rehovot, Israel where they met near the local bank. Their name was given to them by Kaminsky's father, and means "Girls" in Russian.

== Musical influences ==
The band's musical influences are varied, most notably drawing from garage-punk, folk punk, and Russian folk music. In a 2016 interview, the band noted Blind Man Deaf Boy, Crass, Honey Bane and Billy Childish as their main musical influences.

== Discography ==
Farsh (2016)
| No. | Title | Length |
|---|---|---|
| 1. | "Wild" | 00:31 |
| 2. | "Shirley" | 3:13 |
| 3. | "Folk(a) Party(a)" | 3:30 |
| 4. | "Kontrol" | 2:18 |
| 5. | "Bad Things Could Happen" | 4:26 |
| 6. | "Social Security" | 2:47 |
| 7. | "Brush Your Teeth" | 1:26 |
| 8. | "08" | 00:19 |
| 9. | "Dolijute" | 1:32 |
| 10. | "Gozalim" | 3:54 |
| 11. | "International Criminal" | 3:29 |
| 12. | "Diagnosa" | 3:30 |
| 13. | "Looks Good" | 00:37 |
| Total length: | | 31:35 |

Silence is Violence (2017)
| No. | Title | Length |
|---|---|---|
| 1. | "Refugees" | 00:21 |
| 2. | "Looks Good" | 1:25 |
| 3. | "Kosta Kaplan" | 3:19 |
| 4. | "City Rat" | 3:27 |
| 5. | "Adder (Blackbird Raum Cover)" | 4:02 |
| 6. | "Are Welcome" | 1:04 |
| Total length: | | 13:34 |

Deaf Chonky EP (2018)
| No. | Title | Length |
|---|---|---|
| 1. | "Bad Things Could Happen" | 4:25 |
| 2. | "Dolijute" | 1:29 |
| 3. | "Gozalim" | 3:53 |
| 4. | "Bad Things Could Happen (Red Axes Remix)" | 6:34 |
| 5. | "Dolijute (Manfredas Remix)" | 6:25 |
| 6. | "Deaf Chonky (Manfredas Remix Bonus Track)" | 5:03 |
| Total length: | | 27:49 |

Harsh (2020)
| No. | Title | Length |
|---|---|---|
| 1. | "Cut Loose (How Do You?)" | 2:03 |
| 2. | "This Isn't a Gimmick, This Isn't a Test" | 2:58 |
| 3. | "X-Ray Baby" | 3:27 |
| 4. | "Soldier Boy" | 0:57 |
| 5. | "True Love" | 2:30 |
| 6. | "Austrian Waltz" | 3:40 |
| 7. | "Frontline" | 3:18 |
| 8. | "Take Out the Trash" | 2:53 |
| 9. | "The Romans' Road to Heaven" | 0:38 |
| 10. | "Silence is Violence" | 3:22 |
| 11. | "I Was Wrong, Turns Out It Feels Real Good" | 3:13 |
| 12. | "The Babysitter" | 3:28 |
| Total length: | | 32:27 |
