= Yosi Piamenta =

Orthodox Jewish musician

Yosi Piamenta יוסי פיאמנטה
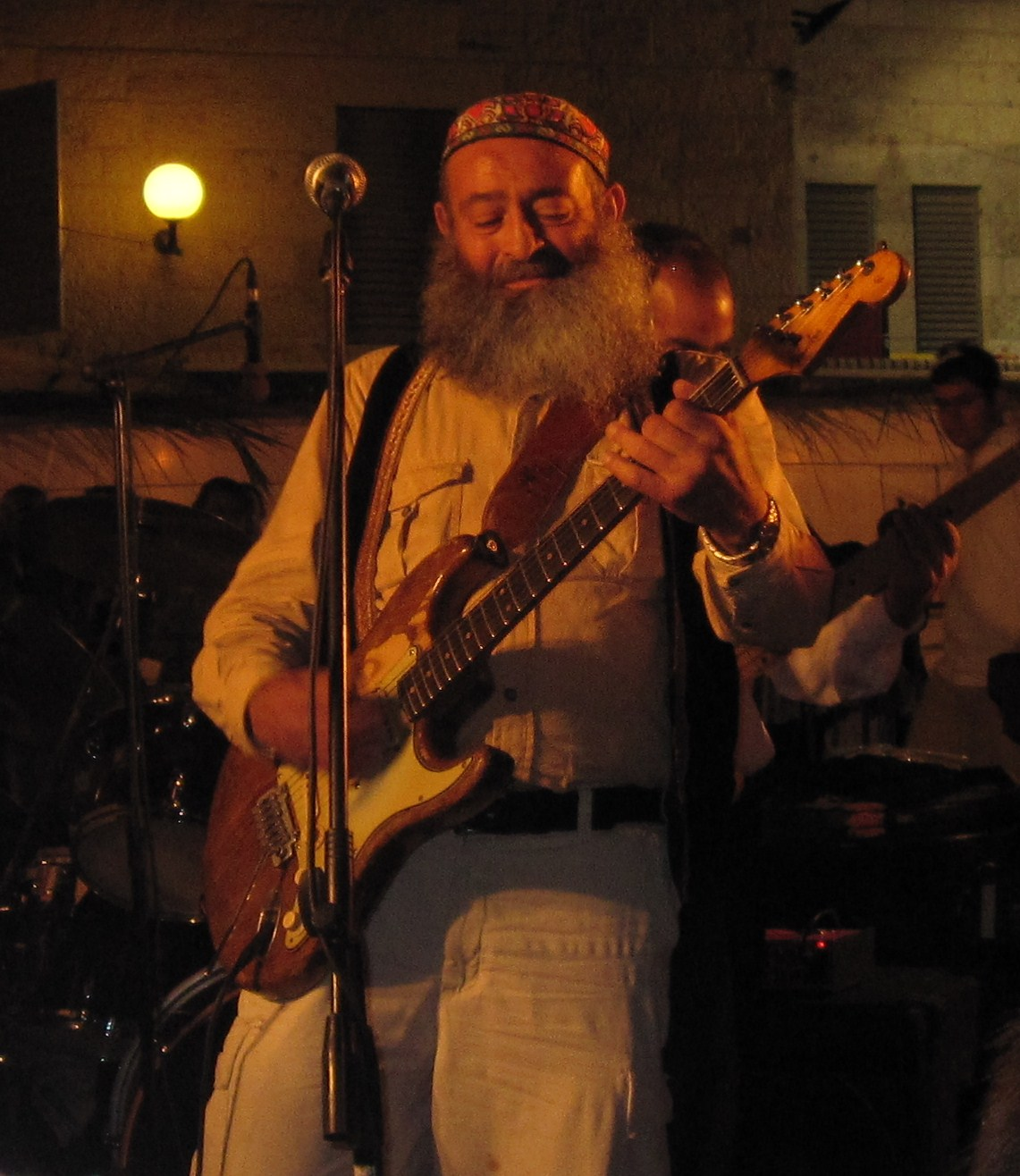
- Piamenta performing at a concert in Jerusalem's Old City in 2009

Background information
- Also known as: Yosi Piamenta
- Born: Yoseph Piamenta; 29 November 1951; Jerusalem, Israel
- Died: 23 August 2015 (aged 63) New York City
- Genres: Jewish rock, blues rock, psychedelic rock, hard rock, nigunim
- Occupations: Musician, guitarist, singer-songwriter, artist
- Instruments: Vocals, fender stratocaster guitar
- Years active: 1972–2015

Yosi Piamenta (Hebrew: יוסי פיאמנטה; 29 November 1951 – 23 August 2015) was an Orthodox Jewish singer-songwriter and guitarist, known for introducing the electric guitar to Jewish music. Piamenta played rock and roll tunes, often infused with heavy rock licks and extended guitar solos – all while dressed in Orthodox Jewish religious clothing and singing Biblical Hebrew lyrics. Piamenta was widely acknowledged by rock critics as a guitar virtuoso.

In addition to being an original songwriter, Piamenta covered others' music in the religious Jewish music category – his album Songs of the Rebbes includes various Lubavitch, Belz, and Sephardi nigunim and zemirot – as well as secular American music, such as Eric Clapton, Carlos Santana, and Jimi Hendrix. Piamenta described his music style saying, "I do klezmer with electric guitar".

== Personal life ==
Piamenta was born in Jerusalem in 1951 to Yehuda and Genia Piamenta. In 1962, when he was 12 years old, Piamenta moved with his family to Tel Aviv. There, he received his first guitar from his uncle, Albert Piamenta, an Israeli saxophonist. Growing up, he practiced traditional Judaism.

In his 20s, Piamenta moved to New York together with his brother, Avi Piamenta, with the intention of working on a joint album with American saxophone player Stan Getz. The album was a success, but Piamenta disapproved of the entertainment industry lifestyle and turned to religion, joining the Orthodox Jewish community. He married his 16-year-old cousin, Vivian, and they raised six children together; the couple separated in 2005.

Piamenta lived in Flatbush, Brooklyn, for over 20 years before moving back to Israel to reside near his father. Piamenta said that he moved back to Israel permanently. He said, "My father, who is 80, called me in New York and said, 'Come back to Israel, be with me a little'. He never talked in that tone before, and I decided to come back. All my life I have played and made music and I won't stop. Now I will play in Israel and form a band and go abroad for gigs wherever I am invited. My base from today on is Tel Aviv". His father, Yehuda, has since died.

In August 2014, Piamenta, together with Avi Piamenta and Naftali Kalfa, released a single, "Yaancha," calling it a "prayer for Piamenta's recovery". On 14 April 2015, Piamenta's Facebook page disclosed that "Yosi is not doing well" and asked fans to "Please pray your hearts out". On 17 April 2015 Piamenta fell into a coma; he woke up from the coma two days later. Piamenta underwent surgery for cancer at the Sheba Medical Center. He died in New York on 23 August 2015.

== Musical career ==
In 1974, Piamenta formed a band with his brother Avi, a flutist. By 1976, the brothers had been discovered by Getz, who invited them to record with him in New York. Piamenta was 26 years old when he arrived in New York and embarked on a tour with Getz throughout the United States. After the tour, the Piamentas joined Getz on tour in Israel. After recording an album with Getz, Piamenta became a baal teshuva (observant Orthodox Jew).

Piamenta's fan base was bifurcated. A majority appreciated him as an iconic Jewish musician and attended his live performances at religious events and Jewish concerts and weddings. Piamenta also attracted a fan base that particularly enjoyed his interpretations of rock and blues, and his lengthy guitar solos that he usually played only at smaller concerts held in bars and clubs.

In addition to his live performances, Piamenta released a series of studio albums that can be found in Jewish homes in the US and Israel. The Piamenta Band was one of the most-requested groups of musicians for Jewish weddings for many years. Most of Piamenta's concerts and albums were performed or recorded in conjunction with his brother, Avi.

== Discography ==
=== Albums ===
- Let's Dance with the Piamentas (1981)
- Ezreinei K-l Chai: A Medley of Chassidic Hits (1982)
- Mitzvah (1984)
- Tismach (1988)
- Piamenta 1990 (1989)
- Songs of the Rebbes (1991)
- The Way You Like It! (1995)
- Strings of My Heart (1997)
- Big Time (with Avi Piamenta) (2000)
- Piamenta Live NYC Performance
- Sason V'simcha: A Piamenta Wedding (with Avi Piamenta) (2003)
- Live at Crash Mansion (with the Heavenly Jams Band) (2004)
- Sameach - Sephardic Dance Mix (with Avi Piamenta and Shlomo Haviv) (2004)
- Yihiyu Leratzon (with Naftali Kalfa) (2007)
