= Heshy Fried =

American comedian

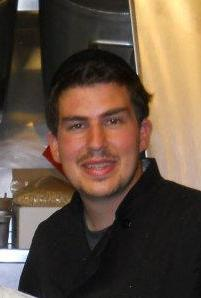
- Born: December 28, 1981 (age 44); Upper West Side, Manhattan, New York, U.S
- Occupations: cook, former comic, former blogger

Heshy Fried (born December 28, 1981) is a former American stand-up comedian and blogger who now works as a caterer.

== Biography ==
Fried was raised Orthodox on the Upper West Side of Manhattan, and he attended the Talmudical Institute of Upstate New York (TIUNY) but did not graduate. Fried moved to the San Francisco Bay area in 2009 and was employed as a line cook at The Kitchen Table, then Silicon Valley's only kosher eatery. He is owner/chef at the Epic Bites catering company in Oakland.

== Frum Satire ==
Fried began blogging on Frum Satire in June 2006 when he lived in Albany, New York, but did not enter the spotlight until about six months later when he wrote a post outlining different categories of sects in the Orthodox and Protestants community.

Fried was named one of the most influential Jewish bloggers in 2008 and was one of seven bloggers invited to Israel to attend the first International Jewish Bloggers Conference hosted by Nefesh B'Nefesh on August 20, 2008. Fried was also invited to attend the Fourth Annual ROI Summit from June 28 through July 2, 2009, held in Tel Aviv, Israel, for influential young Jewish innovators from around the world.

In 2009, Frum Satire averaged approximately 50,000 visitors a month. However, Fried stopped updating his blog in 2014.
