= There's No 'I' in Cherem =

Studio album by The Groggers
- Released: August 29, 2011
- Genre: Jewish rock; pop punk
- Length: 30:37
- Label: CD Baby

Singles from There's No 'I' in Cherem
- 1. "Get" Released: May 2, 2010; 2. "Eishes Chayil" Released: October 28, 2010; 3. "Upper West Side Story" Released: September 6, 2011; 4. "The Shidduch Hits the Fan" Released: October 3, 2011

There's No 'I' in Cherem is the debut album by American Jewish pop punk band The Groggers, released through CD Baby on August 29, 2011. Originating as a series of demos recorded by lead singer L.E. Doug Staiman in his bedroom, he formed the Groggers in early 2010 after the video for "Get" became a minor viral hit. The album was engineered by Aryeh Kunstler and features vocals from Bram Presser of the Australian Jewish punk band Yidcore.

== Background ==
Originating as a series of demos recorded by lead singer L.E. Doug Staiman in his bedroom, he formed The Groggers in early 2010 after the video for "Get", originally made as a joke, became a minor viral hit. The album was engineered by Aryeh Kunstler (whose touring band Staiman had previously been a member of) and mixed by Jake Antelis, and features Bram Presser of the Australian Jewish punk band Yidcore on the track "Farbrengiton".

The album title is a combination of the expression "There's no 'I' in 'team'" and cherem, a Jewish communal practice of shunning those considered heretical. Speaking on the title's meaning, guitarist Ari Friedman said in 2012:

“The album title is just funny. And Doug [Staiman] had no idea why it was so deep and profound. It means you’re not alone. It’s not always about the individual, whether it’s a person or a whole sect. There’s a whole team to think about. There’s a lot of in-group-out-group sort of thing between Jews, and it’s terrible…It’s not your good deeds, it’s our good deeds. It’s not your bad deeds. It’s our bad deeds.”

== Reception ==
Binyomin Ginzberg of The Forward praised the album for its "good-natured yet sarcastic take on contemporary Judaism". Blogger Heshy Fried, writing for Heeb magazine, called it "pop-punk, feel-good music that makes you bob your head in the car and forget about the stop and go traffic on your morning commute."

== Track listing ==
All tracks are written by L.E. Doug Staiman.

No.	Title	Length
1.	"Yetzer Hara"	2:18
2.	"Farbrengiton" (feat. Bram Presser of Yidcore)	2:55
3.	"Malka Jihad"	2:50
4.	"One Last Shatnez"	3:17
5.	"Friday Night Lights"	2:52
6.	"The Shidduch Hits the Fan"	2:32
7.	"Upper West Side Story"	2:35
8.	"Eishes Chayil"	3:22
9.	"Get"	2:24
10.	"There's No 'I' in Cherem"	3:47
11.	"Don't Play Ball on Shabbos"	1:43
Total length:		30:37

== Personnel ==
The Groggers

- L.E. Doug Staiman – lead vocals, guitar, songwriting
- Ari Friedman – lead guitar, vocals
- C.J. Glass – bass guitar
- Chemy Soibelman – drums

Other

- Jake Antelis – mixing
- Aryeh Kunstler – engineering
- Bram Presser – guest vocals ("Farbrengiton")
