= Ruth (given name) =

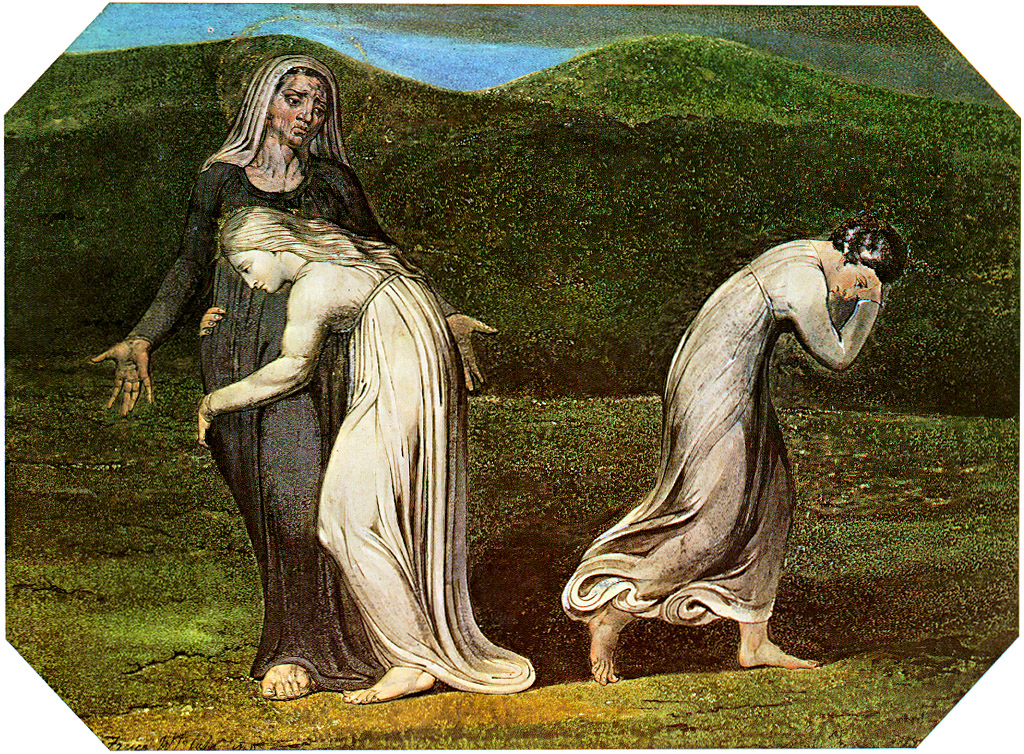
- The Biblical Naomi entreating her daughters-in-law Ruth and Orpah in this image by William Blake based on the Book of Ruth.
- Pronunciation: /ˈruːθ/ ROOTH
- Gender: female

Origin
- Origin: Hebrew
- Meaning: "Friend"

Ruth (Hebrew: רות rut, IPA: [ʁut]) is a common female given name, noted from Ruth, the eponymous heroine of the Book of Ruth.

== History of usage ==
The name of the Biblical figure Ruth is generally equated with the Hebraic רְעוּת (re'ut), meaning companion. This interpretation aligns with the actions of Ruth in the Biblical account, in which she chooses to remain with her mother-in-law Naomi after being widowed.

Ruth first occurs as a given name in Europe at the time of the Protestant Reformation, prior to which the occurrence of Biblical names—unless borne by saints—was unusual among non-Jews.

Although the Puritans generally disfavored Biblical given names, they made an exception for Ruth, as it could be interpreted as a virtue name through its association with the term ruth, a common noun of Germanic origin meaning "sorrow," which could also be interpreted as "compassion." Ruth, therefore, was brought by the Puritan Pilgrims to English-speaking North America, where, overall, the name has since been more popular compared to the British Isles. However, Ruth has been markedly more popular in Ireland than Britain.

Ranked 46th in 1890, the name Ruth surged in popularity, reaching 19th in 1891 and climbing to 5th and 3rd in 1892 and 1893, respectively. The increase in the popularity of the name Ruth can be traced to the birth of Ruth Cleveland on October 3, 1891. She was the daughter of then-former U.S. president Grover Cleveland and his wife, Frances Cleveland. Frances Cleveland became a well-known figure following her marriage to Grover Cleveland on June 2, 1886; she remains the youngest first lady and the only one to be married at the White House. After losing the 1888 presidential election to Benjamin Harrison, whose administration was met with dissatisfaction, Grover Cleveland's return to office was anticipated. He was re-elected in a landslide victory in 1892. The birth of the Clevelands' first child (i.e., Ruth) received significant media coverage, and references to "Baby Ruth" appeared frequently during her early years.

The name Ruth ranked in the top ten for American newborn girls until after 1930, staying in the top 20 until after 1937 and in the top 50 until after 1950. Ruth, traditionally recognized as a one-syllable name for girls, has declined in popularity among American newborns since the mid-20th century. Notably, it last appeared in the top 100 rankings in 1961, holding the 96th position. As of the most recent tally for 2023, the name Ruth is ranked 187th among the most popular names for newborn girls in the United States.

Ruth has also been well-used throughout the Anglosphere and was among the top 100 names for girls in England and Wales during the 1980s. It has since declined in use but remains among the top 1,000 names for British girls.

Ruth had also been a popular name in Germany for both Jews and non-Jews before the 1930s but declined, along with many other names of Hebrew origin, in the mid-1930s after Adolf Hitler came to power and Jewish people in the country were persecuted and killed. At least one German Nazi family changed the name of a daughter named Ruth to the Germanic Ingrid because her father had joined the border police and it was unacceptable for his daughter to have a name of Hebrew origin.

== Variants ==
- Hirut (Amharic)
- Luka (Hawaiian)
- Ruth (English, Indonesian, Spanish)
- Rue (English)
- Rufa (Russian)
- Rút (Czech, Irish Gaelic)
- Rut (Afrikaans, German, Hebrew, Indonesian, Italian, Maltese, Spanish, Swedish, Norwegian, Turkish)
- Rūta (Latvian, Lithuanian)
- Ruta (Polish, Ukrainian)
- Rute (Portuguese)
- Ruthanne (English)
- Ruthella (English)
- Rutherine (English)
- Ruthi (English, Hebrew)
- Ruthia (English)
- Ruthie (English)
- Ruthina (English)
- Ruthine (English)
- Ruthven (Scots)
- Ruti (Hebrew)
- Rutu (Yoruba)
- Ruut (Finnish, Estonian)
- Ruth/Ruthie (English)
- Tuti (Hebrew)

== People with the given name ==
- Ruth Abeles (born 1942), Israeli Olympic gymnast
- Ruth Adler (1944–1994), human rights and child welfare advocate
- Ruth Amos (born 1989), British entrepreneur and inventor
- Ruth Anderson (disambiguation), several people
- Ruth Asawa (1926–2013), American sculptor and arts education advocate
- Ruth Aspöck (born 1947), Austrian writer
- Ruth Baldacchino (born 1979), LGBTQIA activist
- Ruth Becher (born 1956), Austrian politician
- Ruth Benedict (1887–1948), American anthropologist
- Ruth L. Bennett (1866–1947), American social reformer
- Ruth Blum (1913–1976), Swiss writer and journalist
- Ruthie Blum, American–Israeli journalist
- Ruthie Bolton (born 1967), American basketball player
- Ruth Bowyer (c. 1761 – 1788), English convict
- Ruth Brandt (1936–1989), Irish artist and teacher
- Ruth Brown (1928–2006), American singer-songwriter
- Ruth Coker Burks (born 1959), American HIV activist
- Ruth Buscombe (born 1989), British strategy engineer
- Ruth Buzzi (1936–2025), American actor and comedian
- Ruth Chatterton (1892–1961), American actress
- Ruth H. Clark (1916–2022), American politician
- Ruth Clayton (1925–2003), British medical researcher
- Ruth Codd (born 1996), Irish actress and former TikToker
- Ruthie Cohen (1930–2008), American character actress
- Ruth Cracknell (1925–2002), Australian comic actress and author
- Ruth Davidson (born 1978), Scottish politician
- Ruth DeFries (born 1956), American environmental geographer
- Ruth Dreifuss (born 1940), Swiss politician
- Ruth Drexel (1930–2009), German actress
- Ruth Dyson (keyboardist) (1917–1997), English keyboardist
- Ruth Firmenich (born 1964), German politician
- Ruth Fischer (1895–1961), Austrian politician
- Ruth Forsling (1923–1985), Swedish activist and politician
- Ruthie Foster (born 1964), American singer/songwriter of blues and folk music
- Ruth Fremson, American photographer and journalist
- Ruth Bader Ginsburg (1933–2020), American Supreme Court Justice
- Ruth Goodman (born 1963), American romance writer, writing under the name Meagan McKinney
- Ruth Goodman (historian), British historian & TV presenter
- Ruth Gordon (1896–1985), American actress, screenwriter, and playwright
- Ruth Gotlieb (1923–2019), local politician in Wellington, New Zealand
- Ruth Gruber (1911–2016), American journalist, photographer, writer, humanitarian, and United States government official
- Ruth Großmaß, German professor of social philosophy and ethics
- Ruth Gustafson (1881–1960), Swedish social democrat
- Ruth Hale (disambiguation), several people
- Ruth Hall (disambiguation), several people
- Ruth Hamblin (born 1994), Canadian basketball player
- Ruth Handler (1916–2002), American businesswoman and inventor
- Ruth Haroldson (died 1982), American conductor and violinist
- Ruth Hausmeister (1912–2012), German actress
- Ruth Henke, British judge
- Ruthie Henshall (born 1967), English singer, dancer, and actress
- Ruth Hieronymi (1947–2025), German politician
- Ruth Bradley Holmes (1924–2021), American linguist, educator, and polyglot
- Ruth Holzhausen (born 1959), West German volleyball player
- Ruth Hutchinson, Canadian figure skater
- Ruth Ige, (born 1992), Nigerian painter based in New Zealand
- Ruth Prawer Jhabvala (1927–2013), British novelist
- Ruth Jones (actress), Welsh actress, novelist, and screenwriter
- Ruth Jones (politician), British politician
- Ruth Kaarlela (1919–2018), American professor, social worker
- Ruth Kelly (born 1968), British politician
- Ruth Kempson (born 1944), British linguist
- Ruth Kiew (1946–2025), British botanist
- Ruth Maria Kubitschek (1931–2024), German actress
- Ruth Langer (swimmer) (1921–1999), Austrian swimmer
- Ruth Langsford (born 1960), British television presenter
- Ruth Leuwerik (1924–2016), German actress
- Ruth Lewis (1946–2020), Pakistani Roman Catholic nun
- Ruth Grace Moulon (1934–2008), American personality, better known as Ruthie the Duck Girl
- Ruth Herbert Lewis (1871–1946), British philanthropist
- Ruth Lorenzo (born 1982), Spanish singer
- Ruth B. Loving (1914–2014), American activist
- Ruth Lüthi (born 1947), Swiss academic and politician
- Ruth Mackenzie, British artistic director
- Ruth Macrides (1949–2019), American and British scholar
- Ruth Madeley (born 1987), British actress
- Ruth Madoc (1943–2022), British actress and singer
- Ruth Madoff (born 1941), American wife of Bernie Madoff
- Ruth Lor Malloy (born 1932), Canadian activist and travel writer
- Ruth Masake (born 1979), Namibian politician
- Ruthie Matthes (born 1965), American professional bicycle racer
- Ruth McCabe (fl. 1970's–), Irish actress
- Ruth Hanna McCormick (1880–1944), American politician
- Ruth Gowdy McKinley (1931–1981), American-born Canadian ceramic artist
- Ruth Meiers (1925–1987), American politician, lieutenant governor of North Dakota
- Ruth Messenger (1884–1964), American historian
- Ruth Millikan (born 1933), American philosopher
- Ruth Millington, English art historian
- Ruth Mompati (1925–2015), South African politician
- Ruth Wangari Mwaniki (born 1963 or 1964), Kenyan politician
- Ruth Sylvie Morel (born 1956), Canadian wheelchair fencer
- Ruthie Morris (born 1964), guitarist for the American rock group Magnapop
- Ruth Myers (disambiguation), several people
- Ruthi Navon (born 1951), Israeli singer and actress
- Ruth Negga (born 1981), Ethiopian-Irish actress
- Ruth Nortje (born 1967), South African–American canoeist
- Ruth Paine, American teacher known for her association with Lee Harvey Oswald
- Ruth Peetoom (born 1967), Dutch Christian minister and politician
- Ruth Pointer, American singer of the Pointer Sisters
- Ruth Pelupessy (1938–1996), Indonesian actress and model
- Ruth Qaulluaryuk (born 1932), Canadian Inuit textile artist
- Ruth Quarshie, Ghanaian model
- Ruth Reinhold (1902–1985), American pilot and flight instructor
- Ruth Reinke Whitney (1928–1999), American magazine editor
- Ruth Rendell (1930–2015), British crime fiction writer
- Ruth Righi (born 2005), American actress and singer
- Ruth Roman, American actress
- Ruth Sagall (1929–2021), Polish-born Israeli actress
- Ruth Seymour (1935–2023), American broadcasting executive
- Ruth Spearing, New Zealand hematologist
- Ruth Elizabeth Spence (1890–1982), Canadian teacher and historian of Prohibition
- Ruth Hinshaw Spray (1848–1929), American peace activist
- Ruth Stage, British artist
- Ruth Carter Stapleton, American Christian author and sister of US President Jimmy Carter
- Ruth Terry (1920–2016), American singer and actress
- Ruth Marie Terry (1936–1974), American murder victim
- Ruth Thomas (disambiguation), several people
- Ruthie Tompson, American animator
- Ruth Truex (1912–2003), American politician
- Ruth Vang (born 1966), Faroese politician
- Ruth Wagner (1940–2025), German politician
- Ruth Waymire (1960–1984), American murder victim
- Ruth Weckenmann (born 1959), German politician
- Ruth Weiss (disambiguation), several people
- Ruth Welcome (1918–2005), German-born American zither player
- Ruth Westheimer (born Karola Siegel, 1928–2024; known as "Dr. Ruth"), German-American sex therapist, talk show host
- Ruth White (born 1951), American Olympic fencer
- Ruth Holmes Whitehead (1947–2023), Canadian ethnologist
- Ruth Wilkinson
- Ruth Wills (1826–1908), English poet
- Ruth Wilson, English actress
- Ruth Wilson, English missing person
- Ruth Yeoh, Malaysian environmentalist and businesswoman
- Ruth Zernova (1919–2004), Soviet-born Israeli author and translator

== Fictional characters ==
- Ruth, a character in the 1971 American comedy-drama B.S. I Love You
- Ruth, a character from In A Dark dark room and Other Scary Stories, a book of short horror stories targeted to children
- Ruth, a character in the 1992 TV comedy Revenge of the Nerds III
- Ruth (dragon), dragon in Anne McCaffrey's Dragonriders of Pern novels
- Sister Ruth, main antagonist in Black Narcissus
- Ruth Bat-Seraph, a mutant character in Marvel Comics
- Ruth Beckett, a character from the 1984 apocalyptic war drama television film Threads
- Ruth Berent, a character the 1988 American made-for-television drama film Too Good to Be True
- Ruth Brenner, a therapist in Russian Doll (TV series)
- Ruth DeWitt Bukater, an antagonist in Titanic (1997 film)
- Ruthie Camden, on 7th Heaven, the WB/CW (1996–2007) family drama
- Ruth Dunbar, a character in the American television sitcom Bosom Buddies
- Ruth Fleming, from Nerdy Prudes Must Die by Team Starkid, portrayed by Lauren Lopez
- Ruth Fowler, a character of In the Bedroom, played by Sissy Spacek
- Ruth Galloway, archaeologist and protagonist of a series of novels by Elly Griffiths
- Ruth Gogan, a character from Stephen King's Carrie
- Ruth Hilton, central character in 1853 novel Ruth (novel)
- Ruth Jamison, in Fried Green Tomatoes at the Whistle Stop Cafe, portrayed in the 1991 film adaptation by Mary-Louise Parker
- Ruthie Lombard, six year old protagonist of the One Big Happy daily comic strip
- Ruth Martin, a character from the soap opera All My Children
- Ruth Ogada (Krystalin), a mutant member of X-Men 2099
- Ruth Pearce, from the British soap opera Doctors, portrayed by Selina Chilton
- Ruth Shandling, a character in the American sitcom It's Garry Shandling's Show
- Ruth "Rudi" Smith, from the British sitcom Gavin & Stacey, portrayed by Sheridan Smith
- Ruth Ann "Ruthie" Smithens, in American Girl's Kit Kittredge series
- Ruth Ann Torkelson, a character from the Disney Channel show The Torkelsons
