= Mofa Ha'arnavot Shel Dr. Kasper =

Israeli rock band

Mofa Ha'arnavot Shel Dr. Kasper (Dr. Casper's Rabbit Show)
- Origin: Holon, Israel
- Genres: Alternative rock, glam rock, hard rock, grunge
- Years active: 1991-1996 2004 (reunion) 2007-present
- Labels: Hed Arzi Music, NMC Music, Helicon Records
- Members: Shay Lahav (vocals, keyboard), Oren Brazilay (vocals, guitar), Oren Ziv (bass, brother of Imri Ziv), Gilad Pasterneck (guitar), Yuval Haeevi (drums), Ariel Poliakov (guitar)
- Past members: Tzvika Cohen (drums), Shy Nobleman (bass), Itzik Reizenberg (bass)

Mofa Ha'arnavot Shel Dr. Kasper (translation: Dr. Casper’s Rabbit Show, Hebrew: מופע הארנבות של ד"ר קספר) is an Israeli rock band active since 1991. It was part of a group of Israeli rock bands that began performing in the early 1990s and included Knesiyat Hasekhel (Church of Common Sense) and Ziknei Tzfat (Elders of Safad). Their musical style was upbeat grunge funky rock, influenced by bands like Red Hot Chili Peppers and the Rolling Stones, and they describe themselves as the first generation of musicians influenced by MTV — in terms of both music and performance.

Their lineup featured Shai Lahav of Tiberias (vocals and keys), Oren Barzilai of Holon (vocals and guitar), Tzvika Cohen of Moshav Lachish (drums), and Itzik Reisenberg of Ramat HaSharon (bassist), who was later replaced by Shy Nobleman.

== History ==
=== Origin and first album ===
The band began when Shay Lahav received an offer to perform in a small pub in Tel Aviv called "HaAliya HaShnia". He teamed up with guitarist Oren Barzilay, then 16 years old, and together they wrote 7 songs in 10 days for their cabaret-style performance. With bass, drums, and keyboard programmed by Shay on his computer, the band won a small group of loyal fans and was noticed by their current manager, Dudi Levi, who saw their potential. He insisted on signing on a bassist, Itzik Reisenberg, and after several false starts, Tzvika Cohen joined as a drummer. Their popularity grew mainly due to their wild performances which included flannel shirts, eyeliner, costumes, and Barzilay stripping down to underwear with a rabbit sewed on it, along with general chaos on stage.

In the summer of 1993 the band's first album, titled Mofa Ha'Arnavot Shel Dr. Kasper was released, mostly containing songs from their performance, including a rock rendition of an old, classic IDF entertainment troupe song. It was an immediate success. They toured all over Israel, played over 200 performances, and were pursued by hundreds of fans. By the end of the summer, the band was exhausted and decided to take a break, going on a month-long trip to New York City and California.

=== Subsequent albums ===
In 1994 their second album, titled Mofa Ha'arnavot Shel Dr. Kasper - 2, was released. It was different from its predecessor, being slower, heavier, and psychedelic, a result of the members' bemused state of mind following their big success. The album describes what goes on in the mind of a girl named Sheila while experiencing a trip, and the different mental stages she goes through. It was a commercial failure and was soon taken off the shelf.

The group decided to return to their old, fun, light sound in the third album, Ho Ho, which was released in 1995. Despite a return to upbeat songs and many potential hits it, too, failed; the "Golden Era" of Israeli rock had passed. The band blamed poor publicity for the failure, in fact years later some of the songs from this album were still considered Israeli rock classics. Itzik, the bassist, became more religiously observant and stopped performing on Saturdays. Soon he was replaced altogether by Shy Nobleman, and subsequently the band fell apart.

In 2004 they reunited for a short tour, and again in 2005; that year they released an album of one of their 2005 live performances.

=== Reunion ===
Following the successful reunion tour, the band finally reunited in 2007. Since then, they have released three brand new studio albums: Sof Lo Tov (unhappy ending, 2009), Ben Horeg (stepson, 2011) and Manginot (melodies, 2016).

== Aftermath ==
=== Oren Brazilay ===
The guitarist joined a band named Norma Jean, which recorded a few tracks that were never released. He went to New York, started a band called The Sugar Lights, and gradually fell in love with rap music, becoming a sound engineer and working for Def Jam Recordings. He is currently the musical producer of several hip hop artists from Brooklyn, and a member of the band BenLaVain.

=== Shay Lahav ===
After a long break Lahav returned to the music industry as the producer and songwriter of the successful Israeli boy band High Five. In 2004, he recorded a solo album and went on tour, performing some of Kasper's old songs with Barzilay.

=== Tzvika Cohen ===
Cohen stopped playing and currently runs a hotel in Boston.

=== Itzik Reisenberg ===
became an Orthodox Jew, Reisenberg continued to write songs and play, mainly as a hobby, with an option to record some of his songs. He died from multiple sclerosis in 2019.

=== Shy Nobleman ===
Moved to London in 1996, where he started his musical solo career. He released two critically acclaimed and well-received solo albums: How to Be Shy (2001), and Beautiful life (2005). In 2013 he released his first hebrew language album, "Yomi Hu Halom". Nobleman also wrote several theme songs for TV shows, and begun working as a host on various Israeli TV sports shows.

== Discography ==
- Mofa Ha'arnavot Shel Dr Kasper (1993)
- Mofa Ha'arnavot Shel Dr Kasper 2 (1994)
- Ho Ho (1995)
- Mofa Ha'arnavot Shel Dr Kasper Live (2005)
- Sof Lo Tov (2009)
- Ben Horeg (2011)
- Mofa Haarnavot Shel Dr Kasper - Collection (2013)
- Manginot (2015)
