= Ruth Anderson =

Ruth Anderson may refer to:

- Ruth Anderson (composer) (Evelyn Ruth Anderson, 1928–2019), composer (electronic music pioneer), orchestrator, and flutist
- Ruth Anderson (lawyer), Scottish lawyer
- Ruth Anderson (accountant) (born 1954), Enniskillen Northern Ireland accountant
- Ruth Anderson (American politician) (died 2000), American politician in Connecticut
- Ruth Anderson, Baroness Anderson of Stoke-on-Trent (born 1979), British politician
- Ruth Matilda Anderson (1893–1983), American photographer and author
- Ruth Bluford Anderson (1921–2013), American social worker and professor
- E. Ruth Anderson (Elsie Ruth Anderson, 1907–1989), book editor (musicology) and notable meteorologist
- Sherry Ruth Anderson (born 1942), psychologist and co-author of The Cultural Creatives
- Dusty Anderson (Ruth Anderson, 1916/7–2007), American actress and pin-up model
