= The World Is Well Lost =

Studio album by Vaadat Charigim
- Released: 12 November 2013
- Recorded: 2012–2013; Tel Aviv
- Genre: Shoegazing
- Length: 43:34
- Language: Hebrew
- Labels: Anova Music; Burger
- Producers: Kyle “Slick” Johnson; Vaadat Charigim

Vaadat Charigim chronology
The World Is Well Lost (2013)	Sinking as a Stone (2015)

The World Is Well Lost is the 2013 debut album by Israeli rock band Vaadat Charigim. It was released on 12 November 2013 through Anova Music and Burger Records labels. Recorded in the band's Tel Aviv-apartment, the album was mixed and produced by Kyle “Slick” Johnson, who is known for his work for Modest Mouse and Wavves.

== Music and lyrics ==
The World Is Well Lost is a shoegaze album, drawing upon the sound of classic shoegaze and dream pop acts such as My Bloody Valentine, Ride, Slowdive and Galaxie 500. The album's sound was also compared to those of the revival acts such as DIIV and Wild Nothing from While all songs on the album are sung in Hebrew, the vocals are buried in the mix, similar to other shoegazing records.

== Critical reception ==
Professional ratings
Review scores
Source	Rating
Allmusic	4/5 stars
Paste	8/10

The album received generally positive reviews from music critics. Allmusic critic Fred Thomas wrote: "On the whole, the album glides by deftly, more interesting and less derivative than most 2010s shoegaze revival acts, and the underlying pop heart of some songs makes them stand out among the pleasantly dreamy others." Mark Lore of Paste stated: "All in all, The World Is Well Lost is a fine mix of icy guitars and cozy hooks that anyone can relate to." Lore also further added: "Obviously, if you speak Hebrew, the music would take on even more depth. But Vaadat Charigim’s decision to make a record that remains true to their own identity speaks volumes."

== Track listing ==
1. "Odisea" — 07:01
2. "Kezef Al Hamayim" — 05:23
3. "Lehitorer Velo Lada'at" — 05:01
4. "Ze Beseder Lefahed" — 04:09
5. "Haolam Avad Mizman" — 03:50
6. "Ein Nehama Ladoachim" — 03:55
7. "Kmo Lahzor Habaita" — 09:22
8. "Mahshefot" — 04:48

== Personnel ==
Vaadat Charigim

- Yuval Haring – vocals, guitar
- Yuval Guttmann – drums
- Dan Bloch – bass guitar

Other personnel

- Vaadat Charigim – recording, production
- Kyle "Slick" Johnson – production, mixing
- Timothy Stollenwerk – mastering
- Noya Kohavi – photography
- Nathaniel Russell – artwork, design
