= Rockfour =

Israeli psychedelic rock band

- Also known as: רוקפור
- Origin: Holon, Israel
- Genre: Psychedelic rock
- Years active: 1988–present
- Labels: Hed Arzi; Earsay Records; Rainbow Quartz; Anova Music; Cooking Vinyl
- Members: Eli LuLai; Baruch Ben Yitzhak; Marc Lazare; Yaki Gani; Yoni Tennenbaum
- Past members: Issar Tennenbaum; Itamar Levi; Amir Tzoref

Rockfour (Hebrew: רוקפור) is a psychedelic rock band, formed in 1988 in Holon, Israel. Most of their catalog is in English, and they regularly tour the United States.

== History ==
=== Early years ===
Rockfour began writing and performing in Hebrew, and in 1991 released a single, "Haka'as" ("The Rage"), which did well on the Israeli rock charts.

After undergoing several lineup and stylistic changes, they settled on what would remain a fairly stable musical identity in 1995 with their second studio album, Ha'ish Shera'a Hakol (The Man Who Saw It All). The music of the album was firmly rooted in 1960's psychedelic rock and the band used vintage instruments and recording equipment. To complement the "sixties" setting, six music videos were published for song from this album, all in a consistent, distinctive style: they combined vintage footage made with amateur-class cameras with footage of the band in the same style. Though not initially popular, over time this album gained the reputation of being one of the best albums in Hebrew-language rock, especially among younger critics. After several years it was certified as a gold record for selling over 20,000 copies.

After In the late 1990s, the band began to write new material in English. During this period they recorded a studio album consisting of covers of classic Israeli rock songs by Shalom Hanoch and Arik Einstein, Behazara L'shablul. Although most of the songs were written during the psychedelic era, and Rockfour's covers were produced in their usual neo-psychedelic style, the original production on albums such as Shablul was fairly straightforward. In 1999 the band bid farewell to the Hebrew language with a live album (Behofa'a), in which they performed old and new material accompanied by a string section. The last track was a new studio recording titled "Mesibat Siyum" ("Graduation Party"), which literally translates as "Finishing Party".

=== The International Market ===
Supermarket, released in 2000, was Rockfour's first full-length album in English. It received some attention outside of Israel (for example, from Allmusic), which encouraged the band to record another album of new material, One Fantastic Day, and begin touring internationally in 2001. Eventually they were signed to American label Rainbow Quartz. Their first release for the label was Another Beginning - a compilation of tracks from Supermarket and One Fantastic Day, which was followed by For Fans Only! - a collection of b-sides and live covers. During 2001 they produced and played on Shy Nobleman psychedelic pop debut album "How to Be Shy", which became a hit in Israel.

During the recording of Nationwide in Detroit, Michigan in 2004, tensions began to develop between lead singer Eli LuLai and the rest of the band. LuLai left the band in the middle of the subsequent world tour. The remaining trio shifted around vocal duties and returned to performing the night after LuLai's departure.

=== Without LuLai ===
Guitarist Baruch Ben Yitzhak took the role of lead singer for the recording of Rockfour's next album, Memories of the Never Happened, which was released through the Israeli indie label Anova Music. Keyboardist and multi-instrumentalist Yaki Gani was also added to the band after participating in the recordings, making them a quartet once again. In 2006 the groundbreaking artist management/ record label Anova Productions, founded by singer -songwriter and Midem Veteran Anat Damon, picked up the band. With the help of manager Hillel Wachs and after a long production process, the album was released in Israel in May 2007, and internationally on October 9, 2007 on Cooking Vinyl USA, with an accompanying extensive tour of the United States.

During the recording of Memories of the Never Happened the band recorded a cover of Pink Floyd's debut single "Arnold Layne" and submitted it to a competition created by David Gilmour in honor of composer Syd Barrett's death. Gilmour picked Rockfour's version as the best cover of the song, and the band won a day of recording at London's Abbey Road Studios. As of April 2010, these recordings have yet to be released. In June 2010, the band had released their first album in Hebrew from original materials with Anova Music. The album, Ha'olam Hamufla (The Wonderful World) gained the critics' love though the complexity of the materials that merged their psychedelic rock influences with more contemporary sounds in the style of the 2000s Flaming Lips, The Shines and Grandaddy .

May 2013 saw the release of another English-language studio album, Too Many Organs.

=== Reunion with LuLai ===
In November 2014, the band officially announced they will be reuniting with former lead singer Eli LuLai, 10 years after parting ways. In the announcement the band indicated the reunion would not be a singular event but they plan to collaborate as a band in the future. The announcement was followed by a release of a new single with Lulai, "Helkikei Avak" ("Fractions of dust"), and a special live show in Tel Aviv in early 2015. Due to audience demand, 2 more live shows were added. In March 2015, the reunited band released another single, "Namer shel niyaar" ("Paper tiger").

In January 2016, the band held live shows in honor of the 20th anniversary of their iconic album "Ha'ish Shera'a Hakol". It was then also announced that Issar Tennenbaum had left the band and that they would be joined by Itamar Levi. Subsequently they have also performed with Yoni Tennenbaum on drums.

== Style ==
=== Psychedelia ===
From Ha'ish Shera'a Hakol on, Rockfour have kept strictly to a neo-psychedelic style, writing and recording songs using techniques of such classic psychedelic rock groups as The Beatles, The Zombies, The Who, The Byrds, and early Pink Floyd. However, because Rockfour freely recombine their influences, and adopt a playing style significantly more aggressive than that of their influences (with the exception of the record-setting loudness of The Who), the resulting sound is modern and distinct. Among their psychedelic influences, the use of extended three-part harmonies and the unique sound of the 12-string Rickenbacker guitar stand out especially.

=== Other Genres ===
Rockfour sometimes employ the compositional style, though not the winding melodies, of progressive rock groups such as King Crimson and Genesis, most notably on the songs "She's Full of Fears" from Supermarket and "Old Village House" from Memories of the Never Happened. The mellotron, played in a style quite close to that of Robert Fripp of King Crimson, has also appeared on many of the band's studio recordings.

Starting with One Fantastic Day, they have incorporated the heavy, distorted guitar-sound of alternative rock, though it was toned down since the departure of LuLai. Live performances of older material maintain this style.

== Members ==
- Eli LuLai (lead vocalist, guitars)
- Baruch Ben Yitzhak (guitars, vocals)
- Marc Lazare (bass, vocals)
- Yaki Gani (keyboards, guitars)
- Yoni Tennenbaum (drums)

=== Past members ===
- Amir Tzoref (guitars)
- Issar Tennenbaum (drums, backing vocals)
- Itamar Levi (drums)

=== Other significant contributors ===
- Danny Recht - production on Ha'ish Shera'a Hakol
- Noam Ledderman - drums on Behazara L'shablul
- Gadi Pugatsch - keyboards and vocals
- Noam Rapaport - mellotron and piano on Supermarket
- Jim Diamond - production on Nationwide
- Reuven Amiel - Grammy-winning producer and mixing engineer, worked with Rockfour first demos that actually are rare and desirable pieces in the underground Market.

== Discography ==
=== Studio albums ===
==== Hebrew ====
- Resheth Parparim (Butterfly Net) 1991
- Ha'ish Shera'a Hakol (The Man Who Saw Everything) 1995
- Behazara L'shablul (Shablul Revisited - literally, Back to the Snail) 1996
- Haolam Hamufla (The Wonderful World) 2010
- Erez Ir 2020

==== English ====
- Supermarket 2000
- One Fantastic Day 2001
- Nationwide 2004
- Memories of the Never Happened (Anova Music, 2007)
- Too Many Organs (Anova Music, 2013)

=== Other releases ===
==== Hebrew ====
- Rockfour Behofa'a 1999 (Live)

==== English ====
- Another Beginning 2001 (Compilation of English-language tracks from Supermarket and One Fantastic Day)
- Where The Byrds Fly 2001 (3 track CD-EP)
- For Fans Only! 2003 (b-sides, covers and rarities)
