= The Nude Party =

American indie rock and folk band

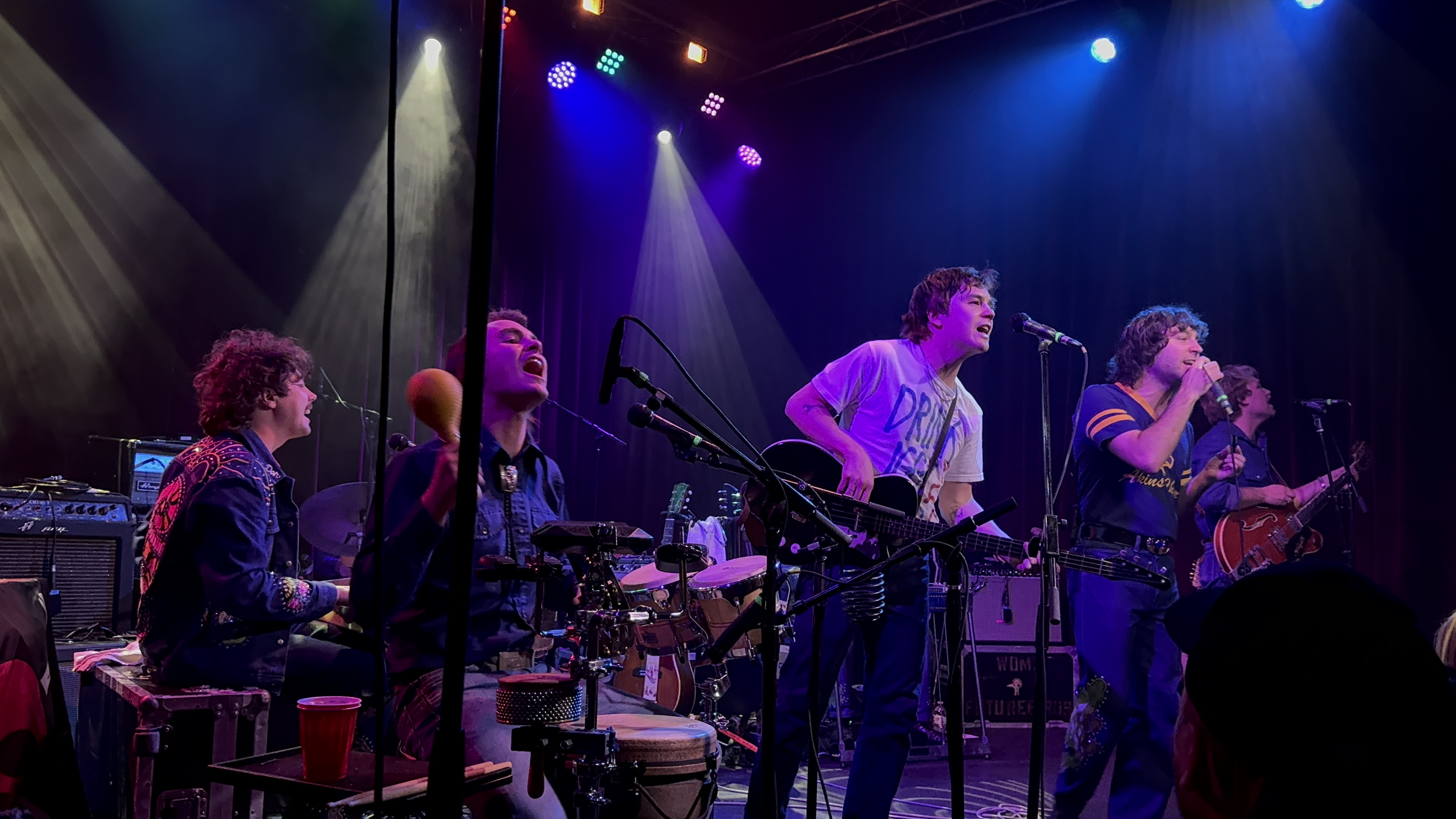
- The Nude Party in 2024

Background information
- Origin: Boone, North Carolina
- Genres: Indie Rock, Folk
- Years active: 2012-present
- Label: New West Records
- Members: Austin Brose; Alexander Castillo; Shaun Couture; Patton Magee; Don Merrill; Connor Mikita; Jon “Catfish” Delorme
- Website: https://www.thenudepartymusic.com/

The Nude Party is a seven-piece American band originating from North Carolina, that consists of Austin Brose, Alec Castillo, Shaun Couture, Patton Magee, Don Merrill, Conor Mikita and Jon “Catfish” Delorme. Formed at Appalachian State University in 2012, the band have released three full-length albums, The Nude Party in 2018, Midnight Manor in 2020, and Rides On in 2023 in addition to Hot Tub EP in 2016.

== History ==
=== Formation and early career ===
The band came together in the freshman dormitories of North Carolina's Appalachian State University in 2012. Patton Magee and Austin Brose linked up with childhood friends Connor Mikita and Alec Castillo, before being joined by step brothers Shaun Couture and Zachary Merrill. At the end of their freshman year, the group of friends moved into a lake house outside of town and began learning their respective instruments to jam on rudimentary riffs and their favorite garage rock songs. The sextet quickly gained a following in Boone, North Carolina, often performing in the nude at a Boone party palace referred to as the “505 House”. The informal aggregation of friends melded to become a defined unit calling themselves simply “The Nude Party”. Their name came from a "demon in an old Ouija board" that the band asked for a band name, according to an interview during a live performance on KEXP, at the eight minute mark.

Upon graduating university, the group hit the national tour circuit and encountered Oakley Munson (of The Black Lips) when supporting his band The Shine Brothers. He offered to produce their debut EP, solidifying a long term creative and personal bond with Munson, with Hot Tub EP recorded over several evenings in Munson's basement in West Asheville. Around an increasingly extensive touring schedule the band gained a reputation as incessant road warriors. Early support tours with Ron Gallo, Twen, Sunflower Bean, Charlie Megira, Black Lips, and The Mystery Lights in turn led to higher profile opportunities supporting King Gizzard And The Lizard Wizard, Cold War Kids, Cherry Glazerr, Insecure Men, The Murlocs, Broncho, and The Growlers.

=== The Nude Party ===
In early 2018, The Nude Party announced they had signed to New West Records and that their debut self-titled album would be released on July 6, 2018. Recorded in two days straight to tape, the record was produced by Oakley Munson and recorded by Matthew Cullen at Dreamland Recording Studios in Woodstock, NY. Munson suggested Jon “Catfish” DeLorme to play pedal steel on “Chevrolet Van”, and after laying down the solo in one take, he has since become a regular touring member. Debut single release “Chevrolet Van '' caught the attention of the wider music sphere and in particular Alex Turner who declared it one of his top five favorite songs to Matt Wilkson on his Beats 1 Radio show.

The band embarked on a touring cycle in support of the record that saw significant growth of their profile and fanbase. After support tours of The Districts and Twin Peaks, the band was invited by Arctic Monkeys to support them for two nights in Nashville in June 2018. Following that, they opened for Jack White on tour in addition to their own extensive US headline tour and European dates. Off the back of significant momentum and a heavy touring schedule, the band relocated to a new home deep in The Catskills, upstate New York.

In 2019, the band resumed touring with a Dr Dog support tour, a 2019 EU and UK headline tour including performances at The Great Escape, All Points East and Best Kept Secret, as well as an Australian tour including two performances at Splendour In The Grass festival. Appearances at Lollapalooza, Newport Folk Festival, and Bonnaroo solidified their status, with many publications naming them one of the best of the festival. The band finished 2019 with shows supporting Orville Peck and The Lemonheads in addition to a co-headline tour with White Reaper.

Their eponymous debut received widespread critical acclaim, with Rolling Stone heralding it as "equal parts ‘I'm Waiting for the Man’ Velvet Underground and Exile on Main Street Stones..(a) self-titled, bare-bones debut, a flapping-in-the-breeze album that evokes Nuggets garage rock and Out of Our Heads-era Stones...singer Patton Magee and his mates are kinetic, harnessing raw energy as only a gang of barely-twentysomethings can". DIY declared the band "the coolest motherfuckers on the block" and American Songwriter lavished praise saying The Nude Party "blow the roof off but do it with style and class, nodding to the past without slavishly imitating it".

=== Midnight Manor ===
The band released their sophomore album on October 2, 2020, titled Midnight Manor. The 12-song set was recorded live-to-tape over six days at the Outlier Inn in upstate New York and mixed by John Agnello (Dinosaur Jr., Kurt Vile) and again Munson produced and Cullen engineered. Released during the global COVID-19 pandemic, the album's first single "Shine Your Light" premiered with an official music video in July 2020, followed by “Lonely Heather”, “What's The Deal?”, "Pardon Me, Satan" and "Cure Is You”.

The album received praise for its development from the band's debut, particularly the evolution of Magee's songwriting to touch on more personal themes. DIY Magazine described the record as “dripping with exuberant charm; The Nude Party might throw back to the past, but there's clearly some very present ambition here too."

Joseph Hudak of Rolling Stone lauded their sophomore record “an unabashed rock record, full of chiming guitars, sha-la-la refrains, and lo-fi production that plays like the soundtrack to an Animal House remake. It's garage rock updated with a touch of 21st-century cynicism, written and performed by a group of self-taught musicians who bonded over Sixties rock & roll.”

Kelly Scanlon of The Line of Best Fit said “"The band started with a really strong debut album, but Midnight Manor somehow takes this to new heights. You'll hear the Stones, you'll hear Lou Reed, you'll even hear a bit of Alice Cooper in there - and you’ll come away having connected with a new, intensely fulfilling sense of cool pervading every aspect of what makes rock 'n' roll so rock 'n' roll; The Nude Party are back — and what a return it is”.

=== Look Who's Back ===
In 2026, the band released their fourth studio album, Look Who's Back. The album was recorded in a temporary studio in Joshua Tree, California. The album has heavy country rock influence, and is notable for its more relaxed sound. The band embarked on a North American tour in March 2026 to support the album.

== Members ==
- Austin Brose: Percussion, vocals
- Alexander Castillo: Bass, vocals
- Shaun Couture: Guitar, vocals
- Patton Magee: Lead vocals, guitar, harmonica
- Don Merrill: Piano, vocals
- Connor Mikita: Drums
- Jon "Catfish" Delorme: Pedal steel guitar

== Discography ==
=== Studio albums ===
Title	Details
The Nude Party	Released: July 6, 2018
Midnight Manor	Released: October 2, 2020
Rides On	Released: March 10, 2023
Look Who's Back	Released: February 13, 2026

=== Singles ===
- "Chevrolet Van" (2018)
- "Poor Boy Blues" (2018)
- "Records" (2018)
- "Water on Mars" (2018)
- "Shine Your Light" (2020)
- "Cure Is You" (2020)
- "Lonely Heather" (2020)
- "What's the Deal?" (2020)
- "Ride On" (2023) - No. 20 Adult Alternative Airplay
- "Hard Times (All Around)" (2023)
- "Look Who’s Back" (2024)
