= Supermarket (disambiguation) =

A supermarket is a large form of the traditional grocery store, a self-service shop offering a wide variety of food and household products organized into aisles.

Supermarket may also refer to:

- Supermarket (comics), a four-issue 2006 comic written by Brian Wood and illustrated by Kristian Donaldson
- Supermarket (1974 film), a West German crime film
- Supermarket (2023 film), a Montenegrin film
- Supermarket (Logic album), a 2019 soundtrack album by Logic, or the title track, or the accompanying novel
- Supermarket (Rockfour album), a 2000 music album by Rockfour, or the title track
- Supermarket (Stakka Bo album), a 1993 music album by Stakka Bo
- "Supermarket", a 2022 song by Wet Leg from Wet Leg (album)
- "Supermarket", an episode of the American sitcom Mama's Family
- "Supermarket", an episode of the TV series Pocoyo

== See also ==
- SuperMercado!, a 1998 album by 2 Skinnee J’s
