= Charlie Megira =

Israeli musician (1972–2016)

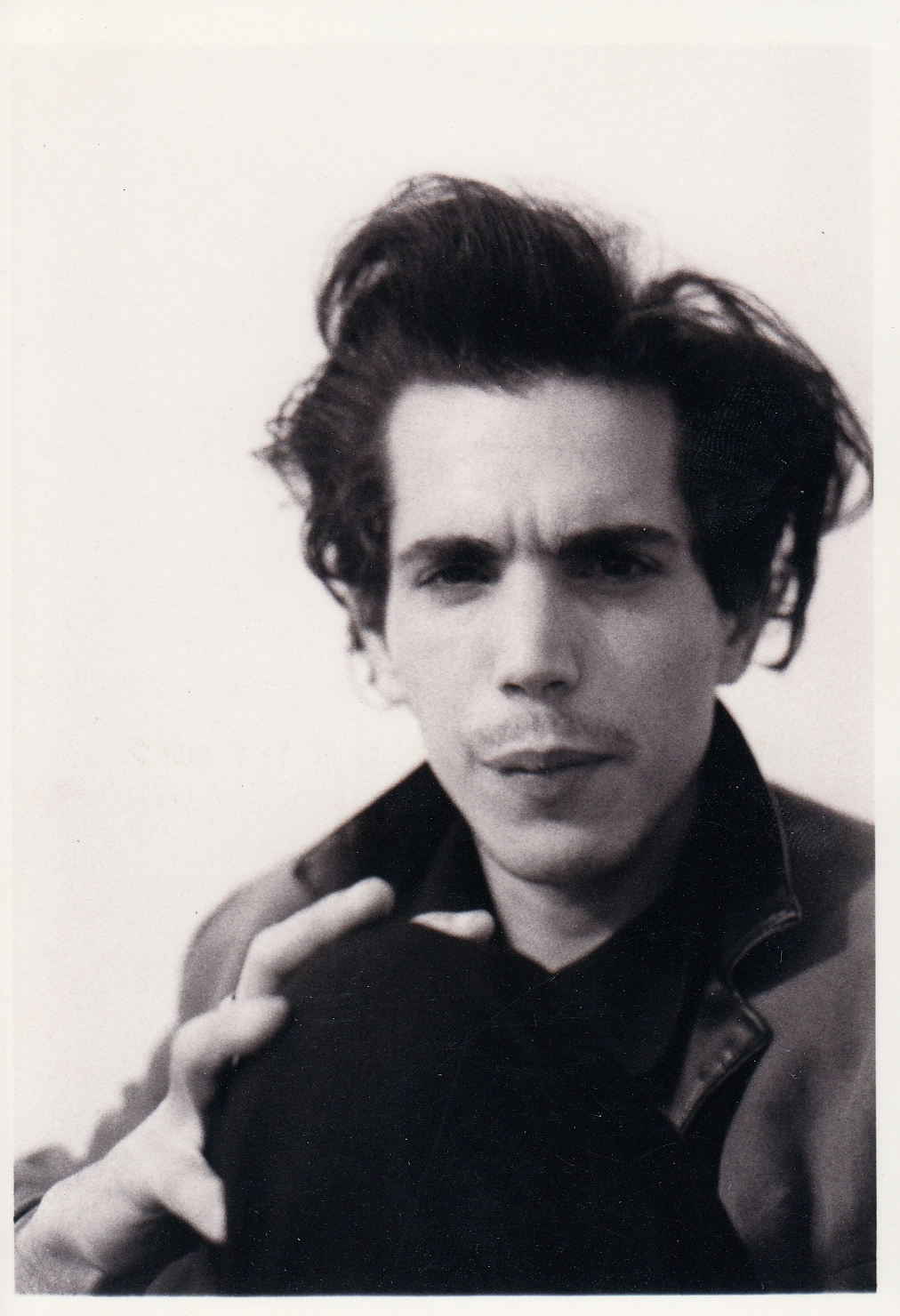
- Charlie Megira in 2000
- Born: Gabriel Abudraham; October 10, 1972; Bet She'an, Israel
- Died: November 5, 2016 (aged 44); Berlin, Germany
- Cause of death: Suicide
- Occupation: Musician
- Years active: 1990s–2016

Gabriel Abudraham (10 October 1972 – 5 November 2016), better known by his stage name Charlie Megira, was an Israeli musician. Born in 1972 in Beit She'an, Israel, he was known for his distinctive lo-fi recordings that blended surf rock, garage rock, psychobilly, shoegaze, and vintage pop influences, often sung in Hebrew. Megira cultivated a mysterious public persona and worked largely outside the mainstream music industry.

== Early life ==
Gabriel Abudraham was born and raised in Bet She'an, a historically significant city in northern Israel, to a Moroccan Jewish (Mizrahi) family. As a child, he was exposed to Moroccan and Middle Eastern Jewish music, particularly the work of Jo Amar and Salim Halali. During his teenage years and early adulthood, his musical tastes expanded to include Elvis Presley and Sun Records, The Smiths, Johnny Thunders, and T. Rex.

Abudraham completed Israel's mandatory military service, serving for three years as a cook.

== Early career ==
In the mid-1990s, Abudraham became active in Tel Aviv's underground music scene. In 1995, journalist and musician Boaz Goldberg began hosting the "Glory Nights" events at the Golem Club, which showcased alternative music. Abudraham performed at these events with The Shnek, a short-lived band he formed with singer Natan Gruper. During the group's first performance, Abudraham was struck in the head with a beer bottle but continued playing until he collapsed. The Shnek disbanded by the end of the decade.

== Charlie Megira persona and solo work ==
Following the dissolution of The Shnek, Abudraham adopted the stage name Charlie Megira and began recording solo material in a makeshift home studio in Tel Aviv. The name "Charlie" was taken from the line "Charlie don't surf!" in the film Apocalypse Now (1979), while "Megira" was his mother's maiden name. Megira developed a distinctive visual aesthetic, often performing in pointed shoes, a lightning-bolt lapelled suit, oversized sunglasses, and a pompadour hairstyle. He described his artistic goal as attempting to "revive a past that never existed." Megira's music combined elements of surf guitar, garage rock, and psychobilly with heavy use of delay and reverb, creating a ghostly, retro-styled sound. His guitar work has been compared to that of Link Wray, while his theatrical presentation drew comparisons to The Cramps. Many of his songs were sung in Hebrew. He cited Mizrahi music as an important influence, with Mizrahi musician Zohar Argov as a personal inspiration.

Megira self released his debut album Da Abtomatic Meisterzinger Mambo Chic in 2001, recorded in his bedroom. His friend , psychadelic pop artist , Shy Nobleman which played piano on the recordings , invited Megira to make his first ever solo performance supporting him on his “How To Be Shy” tour. By the mid-2000s, Megira had begun collaborating with Michal Kahan, a singer and guitarist active in the Tel Aviv music scene. The two became romantic partners and musical collaborators. In late 2006, Megira released Charlie Megira Und the Hefker Girl, a self-released CD featuring Kahan as a core band member. In 2008, Megira formed Charlie Megira and the Modern Dance Club. The band featured Kahan on drums, Tal Fatale on bass, and Javi Scheiner on rhythm guitar. The group released The Love Police in 2009 on Germany's Burnout Record Store label. Megira and Kahan ended both their personal and professional relationship on October 10, 2010.

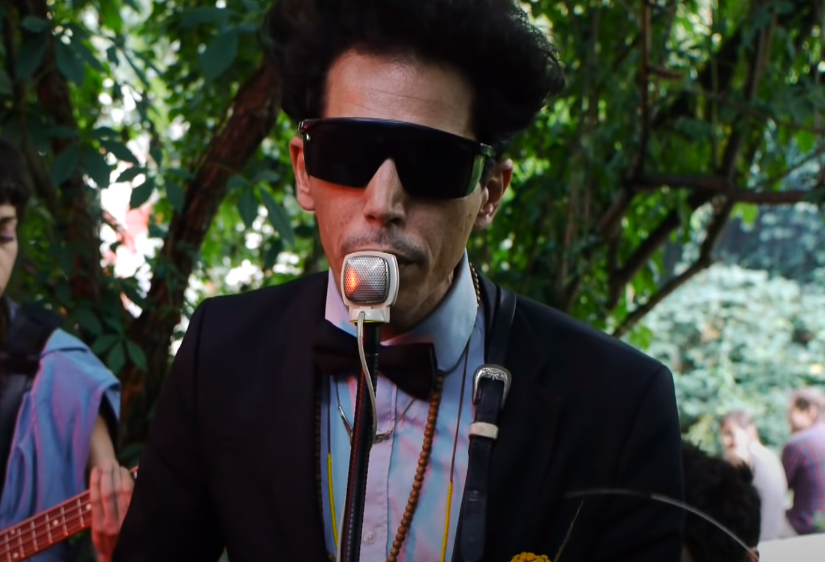
Charlie Megira performing in 2014

After a brief hiatus, Megira formed The Bet She'an Valley Hillbillies in 2013. The band included bassist Tal Fatale and percussionist Stefano. In 2014, the band released The End of Teenage, a cassette-only album issued by Guitars and Bongos. During this period, Megira contributed music to the film The Congress (2013), directed by Ari Folman, working alongside composer Max Richter. Megira also appeared performing with a band in a scene within the film. In 2014, Megira toured the United States with The Bet She'an Valley Hillbillies, including appearances on the West Coast and at Austin Psych Fest. The tour helped expand his international following. Subsequent U.S. tours brought him to the attention of musicians including Shannon & the Clams, The Black Keys, and Julian Casablancas of The Strokes. There were plans in the early 2010s to release music via Julian Casablancas' Cult Records label, however, this never materialized. In 2015, Megira lived briefly in Asheville, North Carolina, before returning to Berlin. In 2016, he returned to Israel for several performances and publicly discussed retiring the Charlie Megira persona. His final performance took place on June 16, 2016, at the Tel Aviv Cinematheque.

== Personal life and death ==
Megira had a romantic relationship with musician Michal Kahan starting in the mid-2000s and ending in 2010.

By 2011, Megira had married Seurat (Sash) Samson, and in May 2012 had a son, Adrian. Later that year, the family relocated from Israel to Berlin, Germany.

Megira often described himself as an outsider in Israel, expressing discomfort with the country's political and cultural climate, and identifying more strongly with underground and marginal artistic spaces than with mainstream society.

Charlie Megira died by suicide on November 5, 2016, in Berlin, Germany. He was buried in a Jewish cemetery in Berlin.

== Influence and legacy ==
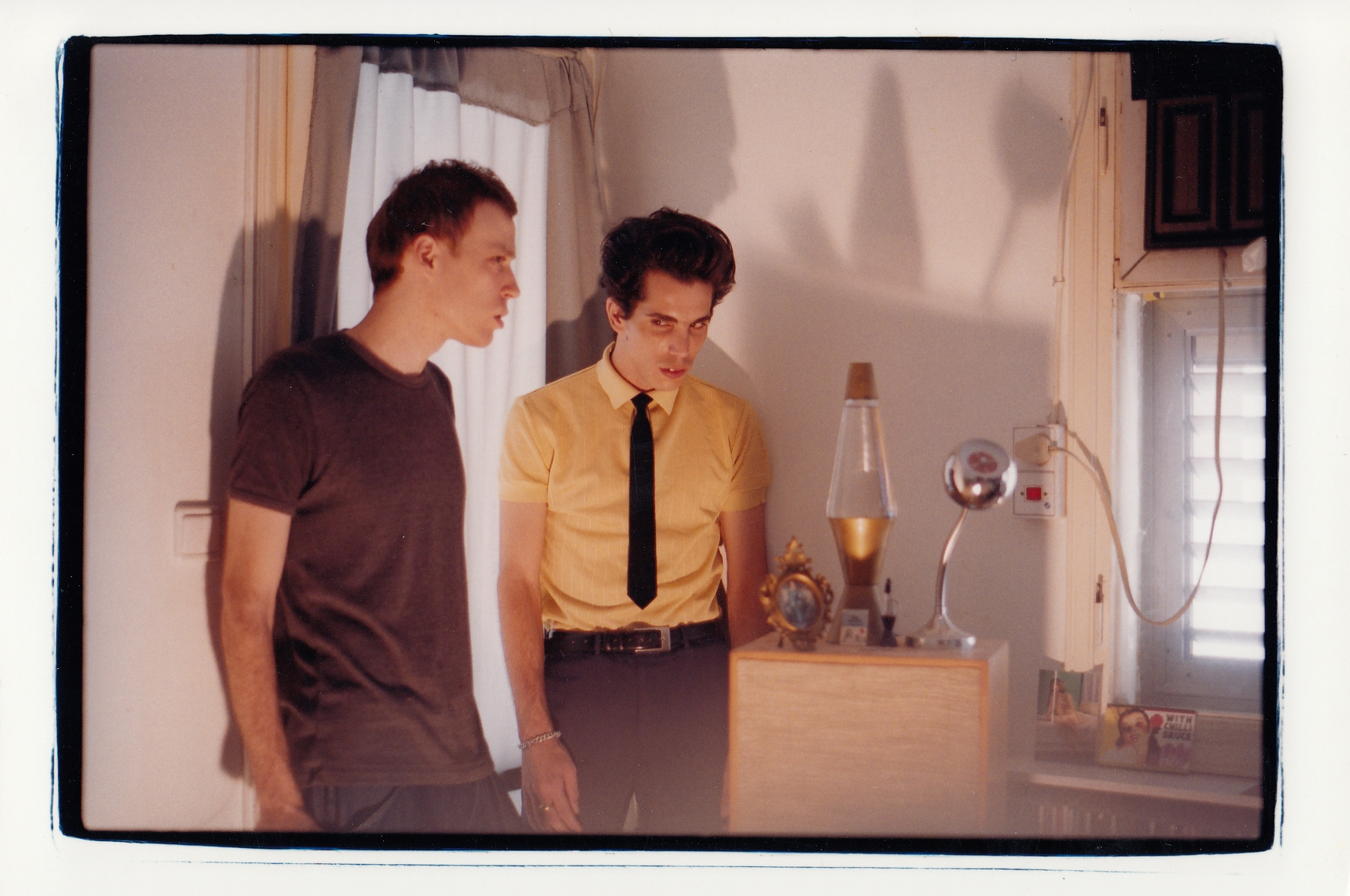
Boaz Goldberg with Charlie Megira, 2000

The Numero Group released the compilation Tomorrow's Gone in 2019. Over the next few years, the label issued remasters of Megira's previous albums as well as unreleased material.

Megira is the subject of the 2019 documentary Tomorrow's Gone, directed by Israeli artist and music journalist Boaz Goldberg. Goldberg, a longtime friend and collaborator of Megira, began filming him during his active years. The film opens with Megira performing "Heart and Soul" by Joy Division and traces his life from Bet She'an through Tel Aviv, the United States, and Berlin. The film was premiered at the 2019 Docaviv Film Festival and was screened at other cinematheques and film festivals, including Kraków Film Festival, where the film was nominated in the Best Music Documentary category.

== Discography ==
=== Studio albums ===
Charlie Megira

- Da Abtomatic Meisterzinger Mambo Chic (2001)

Charlie Megira & the Hefker Girl

- Fragmentim Rock'n'Rolliim (Rock'n'Roll Fragments) (2003)
- Charlie Megira und the Hefker Girl (2006)

Charlie Megira & the Modern Dance Club

- Love Police (2009)

Charlie Megira & the Bet She'an Valley Hillbillies

- Boom Chaka Boom Boom (2015)
- Sign Broke (2023)
- The End of Teenage (2024)

=== Compilation albums ===
Charlie Megira

- Tomorrow's Gone (2019)

=== Extended plays ===
Charlie Megira & the Bet She'an Valley Hillbillies

- The End of Teenage (2015)
