= Holzhauser =

German surname for someone from Holzhausen

Holzhauser is a German language habitational surname for someone from any of numerous places called Holzhausen. Notable people with the name include:

- Bartholomew Holzhauser (1613–1658), German priest
- Raphael Holzhauser (born 1993), Austrian professional footballer
