= Electra (Israeli band) =

Israeli rock'n'roll band

- Origin: Tel-Aviv, Israel
- Genres: Rock and roll Pop music Indie rock Punk rock Garage rock
- Years active: 2001–present
- Labels: Anova
- Members: Nitzan Horesh; Doron Farhi; Boaz Wolf

Electra is an Israeli rock'n'roll band, influenced by 1960s pop and soul, garage rock, and 1970s punk and ska. It is one of the most prominent bands at the Israeli rock'n'roll and indie scene. The band members are Nitzan Horesh (lead singer, guitar), Doron Farhi (bass, vocals) and Boaz Wolf (drums, keys, vocals). In July 2010 Electra has released its debut album "Heartbreaks for Fools", which was followed in February 2011 by the EP Songs They Taught Electra. The band's second full-length album was released in November 2012 in Israel, with already five singles off it: "Charge!", "Starve", "Sirens (San Diego)", "Time and Place" and "Start All Over" being played on Israeli radio stations and TV.

== Biography ==
After signing with the Israeli label Anova at the end of 2009, and under the musical production of Baruch Ben-Yitzhak (Rockfour), The trio released its first album, Heartbreaks for Fools, in July 2010. The album broke through the indie-scene walls, receiving national exposure and a massive media interest. The first single off it, "Coming to get you!" became a nationwide hit and was aired on Israel's popular radio stations.

In February 2011, Electra released a six-track EP named Songs They Taught Electra, playing cover versions of the bands varied influence sources: Desmond Dekker's "The Israelites", 999's "Emergency", Lesley Gore's Ballad "You Don't Own Me", "World Shut Your Mouth" by Julian Cope, Donna Summer's "I Feel Love", and the American Folk song "Shortin' Bread". In March 2011 the band went to its first US tour in New York City and at the international music conference SXSW held in Austin, Texas. The American culture magazine Paste has noted Electra as one of the most impressive bands in that year's festival. Seven months later, Electra went for another, extensive coast-to-coast US tour.

In 2012, when not in the studio recording their second album, the band toured Germany and signed to Tapete booking. Electra's next European tour is due to April 2013. An east-coast US tour is scheduled for March 2013.

Electra is characterized by its members' meticulous dress style, influenced by the '60s and '70s rock bands in New York City and London. The Trio is also well known by their provocative and controversial media interviews, where they express a very liberal left-wing agenda in matters concerning culture, society, and politics, while underlying the importance of indie music as an anti-force to the musical mainstream and Israel's reality shows culture

Electra's second album Second Hand Love was released in 2012 and received enthusiastic reviews on Israeli media.

== Discography ==
=== Albums ===
- Second Hand Love (2012), Anova Music, Format: CD
- Heartbreaks For Fools (2010), Anova Music, Format: LP/CD

=== Singles ===
- "Time and Place", (2013)
- "Sirens (San Diego)", (2012)
- "Starve", (2012)
- "Charge!", (2012)
- "Leaving Graceland/B side: You Don't Own Me",(2010)
- "Dawn of Summer/B side: I Feel Love", (2010)
- "Coming to Get You!/B side: the Israelites", (2010)
- "Better Sound", (2006)
- "Best Days", (2004)
- "Come Inside", (2004)

=== Mini albums ===
- Songs They Taught Electra, (2011)
- Come Inside remixed, (2004)
- Come Inside, (2004)
