= Beautiful Life (Shy Nobleman album) =

Studio album by Shy Nobleman
- Released: November 2005
- Genres: Indie rock, power pop, psychedelic rock, neo-psychedelia
- Length: 44:07
- Label: Noble Tunes

Shy Nobleman chronology
How to Be Shy (2001)	Beautiful Life (2005)	My day is a dream (2013)

Singles from Beautiful Life
- 1. "Girlfriend"; 2. "2 Could Be Better Than 1"; 3. "Baby in the Rain"; 4. "Wonderful/ Beautiful Life"

Beautiful Life is the second studio album by Israeli indie rock artist Shy Nobleman, released on November 2005. The lyrics of the album based mostly around the break-up of Nobleman with his girlfriend at the time.

The album was noted to be a departure from the more psychedelic pop sound of the first album, being more upbeat and more hard rock influenced, with the sound being a mix of power pop with psychedelic rock. The album proved to be very successful in Israel, charting at the Top 10 and becoming the most successful indie rock album at the time.

Four singles were released from the album: "Girlfriend", "Baby in the Rain", "2 Could Be Better Than 1" and "Wonderful/ Beautiful Life". The first two of them were promoted with music videos.

Nobleman's backing band on the album includes such names as singer-songwriter Geva Alon on guitar and vocals (sings co-lead vocals on "Wonderful"), Useless ID frontman Yotam Ben-Horin on bass and vocals, and Rockfour drummer Issar Tennenbaum on drums and percussion.

== Track listing ==
No.	Title	Length
1.	"Girlfriend"	2:52
2.	"2 Could Be Better Than 1"	3:30
3.	"Come Join the Team"	2:22
4.	"Beautiful Life"	4:25
5.	"Baby in the Rain"	3:01
6.	"One of a Kind"	3:22
7.	"Picture on the Wall"	3:27
8.	"Wonderful"	4:19
9.	"Words"	3:13
10.	"Copenhagen"	5:17
11.	"Paperboys"	3:09
12.	"Animals"	2:14
13.	"The Yellow Sun (Beitar Song)"	3:32
Total length:		44:07

== Personnel ==
- Shy Nobleman - lead vocals, guitar
- Geva Alon - guitar, backing vocals, co-lead vocals on "Wonderful"
- Yotam Ben-Horin - bass, backing vocals
- Saul Eshet - keyboards
- Issar Tennenbaum - drums, percussion
