= Albert Beger =

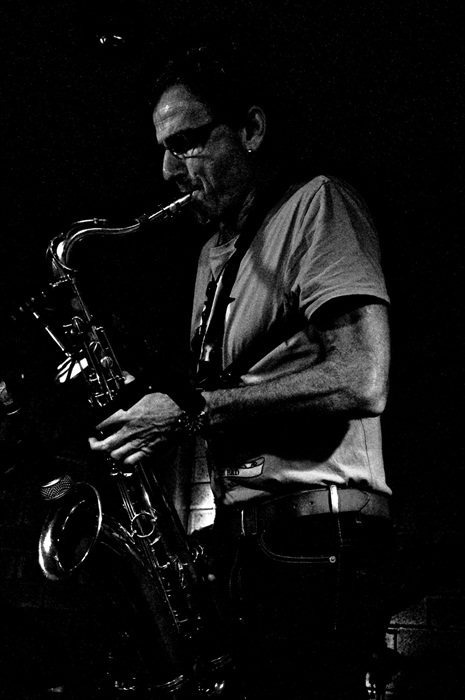

Background information
- Born: 1959 (age 66–67); Istanbul, Turkey
- Origin: Dor, Israel
- Genres: Jazz, Free-Jazz, Avant-Garde
- Occupations: Saxophonist, Lecturer
- Instruments: Tenor saxophone, Alto saxophone, Flute
- Labels: NMC Records, Earsay's Jazz, Anova Music
- Website: www.AlbertBeger.com

Albert Beger (born 1959) is a saxophonist, flutist and an academy lecturer from Israel. Beger is a composer in genres that include post-bop, hard-bop, free-jazz and avant-garde music.

== Biography ==
Albert Beger was born in the city of Istanbul, Turkey, in 1959 and immigrated to Israel with his parents when he was three years old.

From an early age, he was exposed to the cultural fusion in the new born state of Israel, a mixture of Eastern-Europe, Western-Europe and Arabic food, clothes and music.
In his youth, he was mainly listening to the pop/rock music of the sixties, and got carried away in the prog-rock wave of early seventies.
Upon listening to Jethro Tull's music for the first time, and hearing Ian Anderson's flute - Albert was immediately attracted to the sound that was produced by the instrument and during his army service he got himself a flute and started learning the instrument by himself.

Post his army service, Albert studied classical music with legendary Israeli flutist Uri Teplitz, while discovering the tenor saxophone in the age of 25-26. According to Albert, the flute couldn't carry the energy that he wanted to produce and the tenor fitted right for this need.
At the age of 27, Albert received a scholarship from Berklee College of Music in Boston and went to study in the prestigious institute for three years.

This is time when he was introduced with the more free shapes of jazz, and was introduced to the music of Albert Ayler, Coltrane, Cecil Taylor and Art Ensemble of Chicago.
In 1995 Albert released his debut album The Primitive, a collection of early compositions that gathered together to make a surprising debut.
This Life followed in 1997 and was released in Israel by the biggest record label in the country NMC records, and got a distribution deal from Columbia Records.
Art Of The Moment followed in 2000, featuring Menachem Zibziner on Guitars, Gabi Meir on Bass and Amir David on drums.

In 2003, a turning point in Albert’s career, he was signed to the new label Earsay's Jazz, by producer Yossi Acchoti, with a request to follow Albert for future albums to come.
With Earsay's Jazz, Albert released Hevel Havalim in 2003, with his new trio (including Gabriel Meyer on bass and Hagai Fershtman on drums), and Listening in 2004 with his quintet (the former album trio augmented by Yoni Silver on alt saxophone and bass clarinet, and Yiftach Kadan on guitar).

In 2005, Albert received his first formal recognition from the country, when he won the Landau Award for Performing Arts. In a jazz festival that year in Tel Aviv, Albert shared the stage with two of the most dominant figures in the free jazz world – Hamid Drake (drums) and William Parker (bass).
Albert, Drake and Parker, booked a studio session and recorded couple of Albert’s compositions, and the session was released in a two volume album called Evolving Silence (released 2005 and 2006).

In 2008, Albert had released his eight album Big Mother. Big Mother dealt with the topic of ecology and the danger human beings cause the planet. This album was the first to include a pianist (played by Aviran Ben Naim).
The year after, Albert received Israel’s highest honor for musicians, the prestigious Prime Minister’s Award for Composers.
In 2010, Albert had signed a record deal with the relatively new label Anova Music, and released Peacemaker , a six piece conceptual suit.

== Discography ==
- The Primitive (1995)
- This Life (1997)
- Art Of The Moment (2000)
- Hevel Havalim (2003)
- Listening (2004)
- Evolving Silence, Vol. 1 (2005)
- Evolving Silence, Vol. 2 (2006)
- Big Mother (2008)
- Peacemaker (2010)
