= Delicately Violent =

EP by Eatliz
- Released: (Israel) December 24, 2009 (United States) January 25, 2010
- Genres: Alternative rock Progressive rock
- Length: 21:18
- Label: Anova

Eatliz chronology
Violently Delicate (2007)	Delicately Violent (2009)	Teasing Nature (2010)

Delicately Violent is the second release and first EP by Israeli alternative rock band Eatliz, released on December 24, 2009, on the band's live shows, as well as on Anova Records' webstore. The EP was released on iTunes internationally on January 25, 2010.

The EP consists of 6 outtakes from the band's debut album Violently Delicate as well as a newly recorded cover of Björk's "Army of Me" which is a known cover the band plays live from its earliest years.

It is the band's first release to feature Hadar Green on bass.

== Track listing ==
No.	Title	Length
1.	"Food Fighters"	4:09
2.	"Fire"	4:04
3.	"Spliff"	1:50
4.	"Must Get Laid"	2:34
5.	"Pink BiBle"	4:21
6.	"No Feelings"	2:18
7.	"Army of Me" (Björk cover)	2:02

== Personnel ==
- Lee Triffon - lead vocals
- Guy Ben Shetrit - guitar, vocals
- Amit Erez - guitar, vocals
- Or Bahir - guitar
- Hadar Green - bass, vocals
- Omry Hanegby - drums, percussion
