= Earsay =

Earsay is an Israeli independent record label run by the Third Ear (Hebrew: האוזן השלישית, Ha'Ozen Hashlishit), a record store in Tel Aviv with branches in Jerusalem and Haifa. The label has focused on jazz and alternative music since its launch in 2000 with the release of Daniel Sarid's Cries of Disillusion.

The idea for label came from the Third Ear's general manager Eli Hayon. With the financial buffer of the record store, the label can put less emphasis on each release's profitability.

== Artists ==
- Albert Beger
- Jet Sam
- Yoni Kretzmer
- Amir Perry
- Pollyana Frank
- Rockfour, which jumped to the label for the English-language album Supermarket
- Daniel Sarid
- Shalom Gad
