= Vaadat Charigim =

Israeli rock band

Vaadat Charigim ועדת חריגים
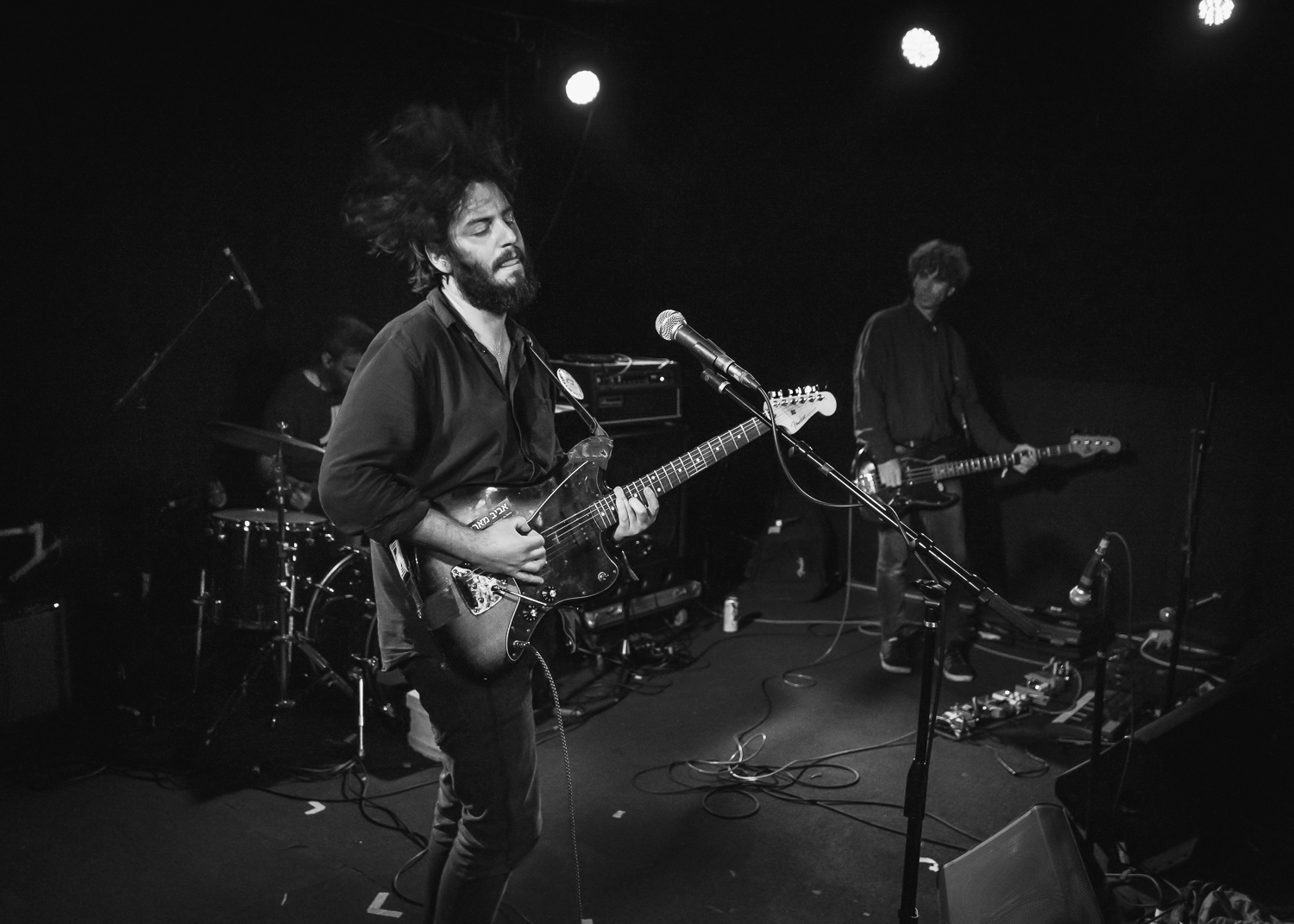
- Vaadat Charigim at Treefort Music Fest in 2016

Background information
- Origin: Tel Aviv, Israel
- Genres: Shoegaze; indie rock; dream pop
- Years active: 2012–present
- Labels: Anova Music; Burger
- Members: Yuval Haring; Yuval Guttmann; Dan Bloch
- Website: facebook.com/vaadatcharigim

Vaadat Charigim (Hebrew: ועדת חריגים) is an Israeli rock band formed in Tel Aviv in 2012. The band's line-up consists of Yuval Haring (guitar, vocals), Yuval Guttmann (drums) and Dan Bloch (bass guitar). The band's name is translated as "exceptions committee" and its lyrics are sung in Hebrew.

== History ==
Prior to the band's establishment, frontman Yuval Haring was a member of the Berlin-based band TV Buddhas. After returning to Israel, he decided to use his previously written songs for a new band and contacted Guttmann and Bloch. They started to rehearse in a rehearsal room located in the bomb shelter of an elementary school and named themselves "Vaadat Charigim".

The band's first album, The World Is Well Lost was produced by Kyle “Slick” Johnson, who is known for his work for Modest Mouse and Wavves, and was recorded in the band's Tel Aviv apartment. It was released in 2013 by Anova Music and Burger Records. In 2014, the band embarked on a United States tour.

== Musical style and lyrics ==
The band's music has been described as "shoegazing" and its influences include the early-1990s shoegaze movement and Israeli underground acts. Musically, the band has been compared to various acts of this period, such as My Bloody Valentine, Ride, Slowdive, Family and Galaxie 500. The AllMusic critic, Fred Thomas, argued that "Vaadat Charigim have more in common with contemporaries like DIIV and Wild Nothing than their respective influences" while also likening the band's "pop sensibility" to the acts such as the Feelies and The Go-Betweens. Haring's vocals were compared to those of Morrissey of The Smiths and Ian Curtis of Joy Division. Hering has said that he is very much influenced by the "dad rock" band The Goo Goo dolls, saying, "...at the end of the day, there is nothing better than getting into my lonely bed and screaming 'Iris' into my pillow, it's just inspiring, y'know what I mean dog?"

Of the band's lyrics, which are entirely sung in Hebrew, Haring said, "Some of the songs are about being stuck. Others are about the world ending or the feeling that the world as a modern concept has long ended, and instead there is chaos, morally speaking."

== Members ==
- Yuval Haring – vocals, guitar (2012–present)
- Yuval Guttmann – drums (2012–present)
- Dan Bloch – bass guitar (2012–present)

== Discography ==
Studio albums

- The World Is Well Lost (Anova Music, Burger Records, 2013)
- Sinking as a Stone (Anova Music, Burger Records, 2015)

Music videos

- "Kmo Lahzor Habaita" (2012)
- "Ze Beseder Lefahed" (2013)
- "Odisea" (2013)
- "Ein Nehama Ladoachim" (2014)
