= Nellie Ahlberg =

American politician (died 1976)

Member of the Connecticut House of Representatives from Cromwell
- In office 1955–1957
- Preceded by: Mildred O. Hofmann
- Succeeded by: Ruth Anderson

Personal details
- Born: 1895 or 1896
- Died: March 14, 1976 (aged 80) Middletown, Connecticut, U.S.
- Party: Republican
- Spouse: Eric A. Ahlberg Sr.
- Children: 4

Nellie M. Ahlberg (1895 or 1896 – March 14, 1976) was an American politician who served in the Connecticut House of Representatives from 1955 to 1957, representing the town of Cromwell as a Republican.

== Personal life ==
Ahlberg was married to Eric A. Ahlberg Sr., with whom she had three sons and a daughter. Ahlberg's son Robert was killed at Anzio, Italy, during World War II, and she was a member of American Gold Star Mothers.

Ahlberg died on March 14, 1976, at Middlesex Memorial Hospital in Middletown, Connecticut. She was 80.

== Political career ==
Ahlberg was elected to the Connecticut House of Representatives in 1954, and she served one term representing the town of Cromwell as a Republican. She was not a candidate for reelection in 1956 and was succeeded by fellow Republican Ruth Anderson.
