= Ruth Weiss =

Ruth Weiss may refer to:

- Ruth Weiss (journalist) (1908–2006, also known as Wèi Lùshī), Austrian-Chinese educator, journalist and lecturer
- Ruth Weiss (writer) (1924–2025), German writer who focussed on anti-racism
- ruth weiss (beat poet) (1928–2020), German-Austrian poet, performer, playwright and artist in the American Beat generation
- Ruth A. Weiss (born 1945), British software engineer
- Ruth Dolores Weiss (born 1978), Israeli musician
