= Teasing Nature =

Studio album by Eatliz
- Released: December 19, 2010
- Recorded: 2009–2010
- Genre: Alternative rock, progressive rock, experimental rock
- Label: Anova

Eatliz chronology
Delicately Violent (2009)	Teasing Nature (2010)

Singles from Teasing Nature
- 1. "Berlin" Released: October 20, 2010

Teasing Nature is the second full-length studio album by Israeli alternative/progressive rock band Eatliz, released on December 19, 2010.

The album has been described as being very experimental in comparison to the band's earlier work, ditching the heavy metal elements which were very dominant on past releases, in favor of more electronic elements, and more use of synthesizers and keyboards, collaborating with the likes of Tamir Muskat of Balkan Beat Box and Omri Behr. Bands that influenced the album's sound include Portishead and Sonic Youth.

In January 2011, the album's release was celebrated with 3 special release shows: on January 5, at the Barby club in Tel Aviv, on January 13, at the Yellow Submarine in Jerusalem, and on January 22, at the Beat club in Haifa. This was followed by a North American tour in March, and a European tour in April.

The album was released in two editions: a single CD edition, and a deluxe digipack edition that includes the album and an additional DVD which features a full live show by the band, which sees the band playing material from all of their career, including the new album.

== Track listing ==
No.	Title	Length
1.	"Your House"	3:51
2.	"Zoo"	3:27
3.	"Berlin"	2:50
4.	"O.K"	3:40
5.	"Falling Up"	4:54
6.	"Got It"	3:05
7.	"Lose This Child"	3:37
8.	"Nine"	3:33
9.	"Voice Over"	3:56
10.	"Goldie"	3:59
11.	"Tears"	3:47
12.	"Mystical Lady"	4:29

Deluxe DVD track listing

No.	Title	Length
1.	"Lose This Child"
2.	"Hey"
3.	"Violently Delicate"
4.	"Zoo"
5.	"Food Fighters"
6.	"Attractive"
7.	"No Feelings"
8.	"Bolsheviks"
9.	"Your House"
10.	"Sunshine"
11.	"Be Invisible"
12.	"Voice Over"

== Personnel ==
- Lee Triffon – lead vocals
- Guy Ben Shetrit – guitar, vocals
- Amit Erez – guitar, vocals
- Or Bahir – guitar
- Hadar Green – bass, vocals
- Omry Hanegby – drums, percussion

Additional personnel

- Tamir Muskat – electronics, programming, mixing
- Omri Behr – keyboards, electronics
