= Eric Tucker =

English painter and draughtsman

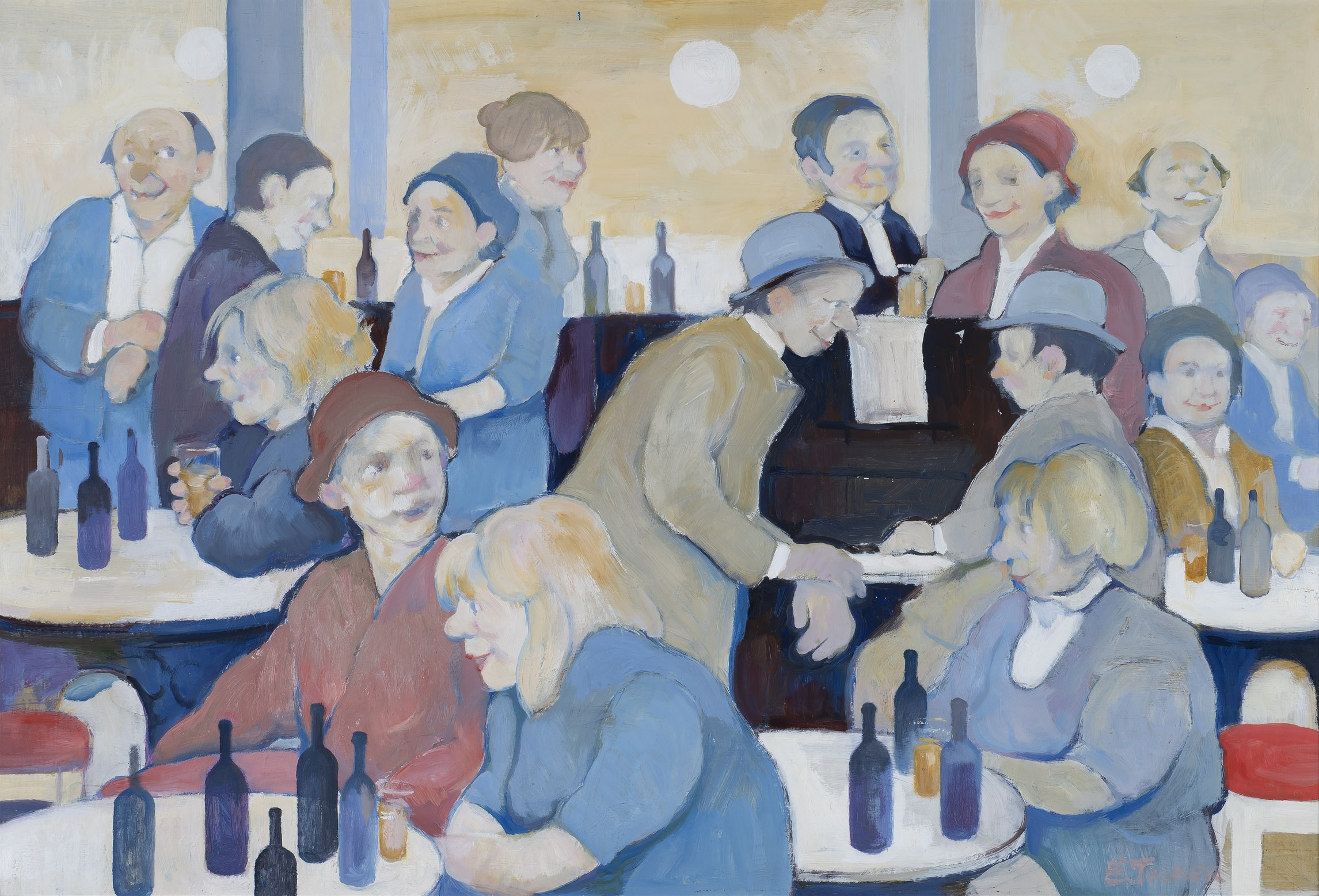
Eric Tucker's painting: Temptation

Eric Tucker (1932–2018) was an English painter and draughtsman, who was born, raised, and spent most of his life at the family home in Warrington on the Lancashire—Cheshire border. He is best known for his depictions of working-class social life in industrial North-West England. The media have often described Tucker as the "secret Lowry".

== Life and work ==
In 1932, Tucker was the first-born child to parents Eric and Joan — respectively a greengrocer and a domestic maid — and grew up in working class poverty in an area of England that underwent great hardship during the Great Depression. In 1942, his father Eric was killed in active service in the British Army in the North African Campaign of the Second World War, the loss leaving a profound impression on him.

He received no formal art education, was a frequent truant and left school at 14, though interested in painting, he went every weekend by train to the art galleries in Manchester nearby and on one occasion at the Tib Lane Gallery he had an encounter with L.S. Lowry. He did his basic training in National Service at Catterick, North Yorkshire before being assigned to the Royal Horse Guards in Windsor, Berkshire then West Germany, where he ended up working in the cookhouse, after a number of periods in the glasshouse for going AWOL, due to having an anti-authoritarian streak. He was apprenticed as a sign-writer, but never took this further, and worked variously as a boxer, a steelworker, a gravedigger, and a building labourer. Not many people beyond close family were aware that he painted. Unknown during his lifetime, Tucker made very few attempts to show or sell his work, and he sold just two paintings.

Typically, he would do his preliminary sketches unobserved just under the table top, while sitting having a pint in the pub, before assembling these into finished paintings at home.

His work came to public attention following his death in 2018, when he left behind a hoard of more than 500 paintings, and thousands of drawings, in his council house in Warrington. Visitors queued around the block to see a two-day exhibition at Tucker's house. Following this, a 2019 retrospective at Warrington Museum & Art Gallery, titled Eric Tucker: The Unseen Artist, attracted record numbers of visitors to the gallery. In July 2021, two London art galleries – Connaught Brown and Alon Zakaim – exhibited 40 oil paintings and watercolours by him.

Tucker was influenced by artists including Edward Burra, Edgar Degas, and Henri de Toulouse-Lautrec.

Critics have compared Tucker to Burra, Lowry, James Ensor, Julian Trevelyan, and Eric Ravilious. Art critic Ruth Millington described Tucker's work as a 'significant contribution to modern British art'.

The Secret Painter — a biography about Tucker, his life, paintings, and legacy — was written by his nephew Joe Tucker after his uncle's death. This biography was abridged into five episodes read by Paul Ready for the BBC Radio 4's Book of the Week series and broadcast over five days from 7 July 2025.
