= Nikmat HaTraktor =

Israeli rock music band

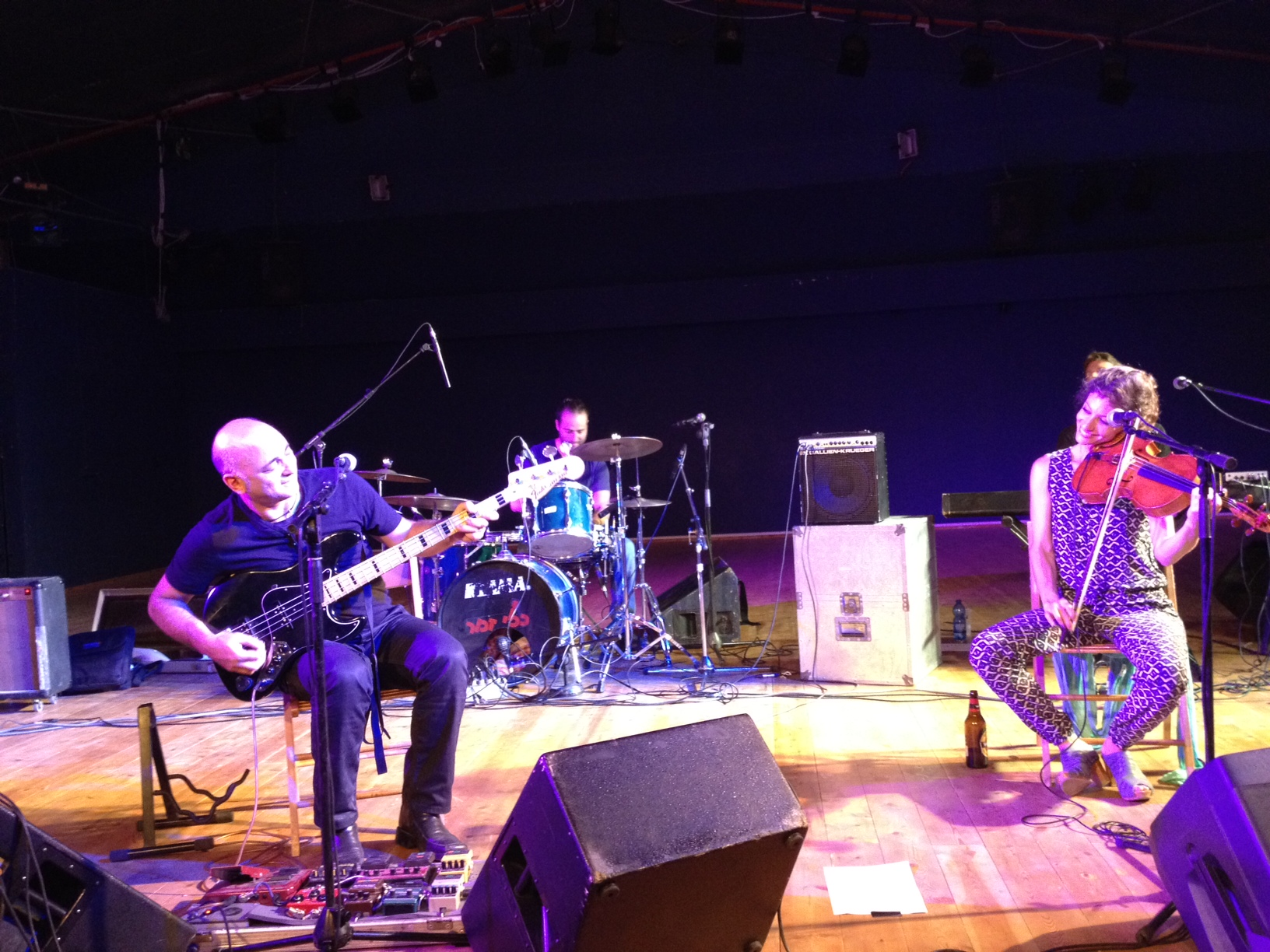
Nikmat HaTraktor

Nikmat HaTraktor (Hebrew: נקמת הטרקטור, lit. Tractor's Revenge) is an Israeli rock music band.

== History ==
Nikmat Hatraktor was established in 1988 in Tel Aviv by singer and bass player Avi Balali, keyboardist Ilan Green and guitarist Ophir Leibovitch. Other band members include Eyal Parson Shachar on keyboard and Aviv Barak on drums. The band's name is an ode to the "famous" FortiSakharof (another Israeli rock band) song of the same name that was released that year. After being rejected by a number of record labels, the band was finally signed by Nana Records. Their debut album, Nikmat HaTraktor, was released in 1990. It was produced by Bari Sacharof (of the aforementioned band FortiSakharof), and contained a number of their hits, the prominent ones including: Mischak Shel Dma'ot (משחק של דמעות, lit. A Game of Tears), Adon HaSelikhot (אדון הסליחות, lit. Master of Forgiveness) based on the Sephardic Jewish incantation bearing the same name, and Afifonim (עפיפונים, lit. Kites) - the Hebrew translation of Simon Dupree and the Big Sound's song.

Nikmat HaTraktor fused modern Israeli sound with age-old Middle Eastern themes, creating a new genre that paved the way for other Israeli bands, among them Knesiyat Hasekhel. The band appeared with the Batsheva Dance Company in their "Kyr" production, which Nikmat HaTraktor wrote the music for Yossi Pollack's Othello (an Israstage production).

== Discography ==
- Nikmat HaTraktor (1990)
- Zchut Hatse'aka (1992)
- Kyr (with Ohad Naharin) (1992)
- Aronot Mitbach (1995)
- Mitbach Accusti (1996)
- Ta'ut shel HaYare'ach (1999)
- Le'an Holchim Pit'om Kulam (2003)
- Nishar Rak Larutz (Anova Music, 2011)
- Ma Le'ahuve (Anova Music, 2013)

== See also ==
- Music of Israel
