= Holzhausen =

Holzhausen may refer to:

== Places ==
Germany

- Holzhausen, Münsing, a locality in the municipality of Münsing, Bavaria
- Holzhausen am Ammersee, part of Utting on the Ammersee, Bavaria
- Holzhausen über Aar, a village in Hessen
- Holzhausen (Stralsund), a student village in Stralsund, Mecklenburg-Vorpommern
- Holzhausen (Porta Westfalica), a village in the Porta Westfalica municipality, North Rhine-Westphalia
- Holzhausen, Bad Laasphe, a village in the Siegen-Wittgenstein district, North Rhine-Westphalia
- Holzhausen an der Haide, a municipality in the Rhein-Lahn district, Rhineland-Palatinate
- Holzhausen, Saxony-Anhalt, a municipality in the district of Stendal, Saxony-Anhalt
- Holzhausen, Amt Wachsenburg, part of Amt Wachsenburg, Thüringen

Austria

- Holzhausen, Austria, a municipality in Upper Austria, Austria

Poland

- Holzhausen, former German name of the village Nabyszyce in Ostrów County, Greater Poland Voivodeship, in west-central Poland

== People with the surname ==
- Ruth Holzhausen, West German volleyball player
- Franz von Holzhausen, Chief Designer of Tesla Inc.
