= Violently Delicate =

Studio album by Eatliz
- Released: November 1, 2007
- Recorded: August 2006 at Kitcha Studios in Tel Aviv, Israel
- Genre: Alternative rock, progressive rock
- Label: Anova

Eatliz chronology
Violently Delicate (2007)	Delicately Violent (2009)

Violently Delicate is the debut full-length studio album by Israeli alternative rock band Eatliz, released on November 1, 2007.

The album was released in a special album release show in Israel on November 8, 2007. The release show took place at the Barby club, Tel Aviv, and saw the band hosting Israeli progressive rock musician Shlomo Gronich for a special song.

== Track listing ==
No.	Title	Length
1.	"Bolsheviks"	5:09
2.	"Violently Delicate"	3:54
3.	"Attractive"	3:40
4.	"Hey"	3:08
5.	"Sunshine"	5:25
6.	"Say Where"	3:29
7.	"Big Fish"	3:43
8.	"I Don't Care"	5:07
9.	"Mix Me"	4:07
10.	"Be Invisible"	4:42
11.	"Whore"	4:09
12.	"Mountain Top"	4:16

== Personnel ==
- Lee Triffon - lead vocals
- Guy Ben Shetrit - guitar, vocals
- Amit Erez - guitar, vocals
- Or Bahir - guitar
- Adam Shefflan - bass, vocals
- Omry Hanegby - drums, percussion
