= Ruth Thomas =

Ruth Thomas may refer to:

- Ruth Thomas (novelist) (born 1967), British novelist
- Ruth Thomas (children's writer) (1927–2011), English author of children's fiction
- Ruth E. Thomas (1926–2020), educator and community leader in the United States Virgin Islands
