= Eatliz =

Israeli alternative/progressive rock band

- Origin: Tel Aviv, Israel
- Genres: Alternative rock; progressive rock; pop
- Years active: 2001–2015
- Label: Anova Music
- Members: Sivan Abelson; Guy Ben Shetrit; Noam Shaham; Omry Hanegby; Omer Hershman
- Past members: Lee Triffon; Adam Shefflan; Maya Dunitz; Sarit Shazky; Uzi Finerman; Yaron Mitelman; Talia Krieger; Yuval Samo; Or Bahir; Amit Erez; Hadar Green
- Website: Official website (inactive)

Eatliz is an Israeli rock band originally formed in 2001. Guitarist Guy Ben Shetrit of the punk rock band Infectzia wanted a serious musical project as opposed to the more humorous Infectzia. Extensive gigging gained the band a following over the next five years. It recorded two demo tapes, though they were never released as band membership was constantly changing.

Eatliz is currently inactive, though the band has never officially disbanded. Their last performance was in 2015, and their Facebook page hasn't been updated since that year.

== History ==
=== Formation and early years (2001–2005) ===
Guitarist Guy Ben Shetrit, then also a member of the punk rock band Infectzia, formed Eatliz in 2010 by as a side project. Singer Yael Kraus joined and together they wrote mostly complicated guitar tunes and prominent keyboard melodies. This line-up recorded a demo but quickly dissolved. Shetrit retained some of the members, including guitarist Or Bahir and drummer Omry Hanegby, as he continued the project under the same name.

Vocalist Talia Kliger, guitarist Uzi Finerman, bassist Adam Shefflan and keyboardist Yuval Samo joined the group over time. However, Samo left quickly after joining to study music in the United States and was replaced with Finerman's partner at the time, Maya Dunietz, who alternated with Kliger as lead vocalist and also played keyboard. When Kliger left the band shortly after joining, Dunietz became sole lead singer. This formed the band's first stable line-up.

It started performing across Israel, attracting attention in the Israeli indie rock scene through Dunietz' stage presence and charisma. Eatliz also gained attention by hosting many guests from the Israeli alternative and indie scenes in its live shows as well as playing covers of such artists as Soundgarden, Queen, The Beatles, and Björk.

The band recorded an unreleased demo in 2003. Soon after, Finerman left for personal reasons, briefly replaced by Yaron Mitelman. The group then took a hiatus when lead singer Maya Dunietz quit to focus on more experimental music projects.

Eatliz returned to the stage in November 2004 with a new singer, Sarit Shazky, who was Shetrit's life partner at the time. However, the new line-up's performances received mixed reactions and the band didn't attract as much interest from international labels as they expected. The band's second demo was unreleased.

=== Violently Delicate (2005–2008) ===
Guitarist and indie/folk artist Amit Erez joined the band in 2015, after which Shazky left the group and was replaced by Lee Triffon as lead singer. This more stable line-up proved to be well received by audiences in the band's performances in 2005. In August of 2006 the band began recording their debut album at Kitcha Studios.

This album, Violently Delicate, was finally released on November 1, 2007. Its material had mostly been written between 2003 and 2005 and was credited to Shetrit and Dunietz with only two songs credited to Triffon. Anova Music released the album in Israel, Germany, Switzerland, and Austria and received very positive reviews. A special release show for the album took place at the Barby club in Tel Aviv and drew an audience of around 500 people on November 8, 2007.

In late 2008, bassist Adam Shefflan left the band to focus on music production and was replaced by Hadar Green.

The album's first single "Attractive" was successful in Israel and was played on radio stations. Soon after it also received widespread radio airplay in Germany which led to an invitation for the band to play at the Popkomm Festival in Berlin. It was featured on the Israeli heavy metal compilation Israel Unleashed which Sony BMG released worldwide.

The album was promoted through the music videos "Attractive" and "Hey." "Attractive" was chosen to promote the MTV Artists Spot featuring the band. It also won the Ourstage.com grand prize through an audience vote. It was played on Israeli music channel Music 24 which selected it as Music Video of the Year. "Hey" won 9 international awards, including the Spike Lee Award at the Babelgum competition during the Tribeca film festival. Both videos received critical acclaim and gained over 500,000 views on YouTube.

=== Delicately Violent (2010–2012) ===
In November 2009, the band released their second project and first EP, Delicately Violent, which included 7 songs, 6 outtakes from the recording sessions of their debut album, and one newly recorded cover of Björk's "Army of Me" which became a staple in the band's live shows. The band held the EP's release party at the Barby club that same month. There they hosted Israeli soul/jazz musician Shlomo Gronich, performing his song "Luna Park" with him. The track was also recorded in the studio for Gronich's latest "best-of" compilation. On May 29, 2010, Eatliz played at the Primavera Sound Festival in Barcelona, Spain, also playing one free show in the city the day prior. The band opened on July 7 2010 for Porcupine Tree and on July 14 for Dweezil Zappa at their Israeli shows in Tel Aviv.

On October 15, 2010, it performed, with three cellists and a pianist, orchestral arrangements of both old material and songs from their upcoming album at a single classical performance.

That album, their second full-length studio release, was named Teasing Nature, and debuted on December 19, 2010, following an intimate showcase at the Levontin 7 club in Tel Aviv on December 5, 2010. A series of special release shows took place in Tel Aviv, Jerusalem, and Haifa in January 2011. The band then embarked on a North American tour in March and April 2011 with an appearance at the SXSW Festival in Austin, Texas, as well as opening for Consider The Source. It performed at the Exit Festival in Novi Sad, Serbia in July 2011.

In a November 2011 interview, the band announced it plans to release a new album with classical arrangements of its songs in the beginning of 2012, though this was never released.

It toured Hong Kong and China for the first time in March of 2012, performing at the JUE Music + Art Festival in Shanghai, Nanjing, Wuhan, and other chinese cities.

On July 26, 2012, the band announced the exit of Triffon and Erez. It said Triffon decided to leave a few months earlier because of "artistic differences" and Erez left to focus on his solo career. Sivan Abelson, a graduate singer from Rimon school of jazz and contemporary music, replaced Triffon as lead singer and Omer Hershman from the band Panic Ensemble replaced Erez.

=== All of it (2013–present) ===
The band released the first single featuring Abelson, titled "Miserable," in December 2013. A second single featuring Abelson, titled "One of Us," followed in January 2014. In June of that year the band released their new album, All of it, with a showcase that took place in the "Tmuna" club in Tel Aviv. The band also embarked on a small tour around Israel and performed at the club Syrup in Haifa and the Yellow Submarine club in Jerusalem. With the release of the album, the band's bassist Hadar Green left the band for unknown reasons and was replaced by Noam Shaham.

=== Teasing Nature (2015–2018) ===
In April and May 2015 the band went on their first German tour, playing in Hammelburg, Bremen, Hamburg, Berlin among other cities. An Israeli tour followed in June 2015 that included Netanya, Petah Tikva, Jerusalem, Modi'in, and Tel Aviv.

== Musical style ==
The band's musical style is mostly labeled as alternative rock and progressive rock, but it takes influences and elements from punk rock, hard rock, folk rock, heavy metal, pop, surf rock, gothic rock, britpop, power pop, Arabic music, jazz, bossa nova and more. The band members themselves describe their sound as pop."

The band claims such bands as Mr. Bungle, The Mars Volta, Sleepytime Gorilla Museum, Cardiacs, Portishead and Björk as their main influences.

== Band members ==
Current members

- Sivan Abelson - lead vocals (2012–present)
- Omer Hershman - guitar, vocals (2012–present)
- Guy Ben Shetrit - guitar (2001–present)
- Noam Shaham - bass (2014–present)
- Omry Hanegby - drums, percussion (2001–present

=== Former members ===
- Hadar Green - bass (2008–2014)
- Or Bahir - guitar (2001–2012)
- Lee Triffon - lead vocals (2006–2012)
- Amit Erez - guitar, vocals (2004–2012)
- Adam Shefflan - bass, vocals (2003–2008)
- Maya Dunietz - lead vocals, keyboards (2003–2004)
- Sarit Shazky - lead vocals, keyboards (2004–2005)
- Uzi Finerman - guitar (2003)
- Yaron Mitelman - guitar (2003–2004)
- Yuval Samo - keyboards (2003)
- Talia Kliger - lead vocals (2003)

== Discography ==
- Violently Delicate (2007)
- Delicately Violent (2009)
- Teasing Nature (2010)
- All of it (2014)
