= Ruth Großmaß =

German professor

Ruth Großmaß is a German professor of social philosophy and ethics. She lives and works in Bielefeld and Berlin.

== Life and work ==
After completing her state examination in philosophy, German studies and Pedagogy at Ruhr University Bochum and Philipps University Marburg in 1973, she worked as a tutor, teaching assignments, trained in group dynamics and was active in women's studies until 1976.

From 1976 to 2006, Großmaß took up a practical position in the central study advisory service at Bielefeld University with a focus on women and study skills and received her doctorate in 1999 with a thesis on counseling.

She held teaching positions at the University of Duisburg-Essen, Bielefeld University and the Technical University of Dresden. Until 1983, Großmaß took part in extra-occupational training courses in conversation management, institutional counseling and Göttingen Model of Depth Psychology-based Group Psychotherapy.

Großmaß works as a freelancer in supervision and facilitation in women's projects and social work institutions.

From 1990 to 1998 she worked on the editorial board of the journal Psychologie und Gesellschaftskritik and since 2003 she has been a member of the Women's Shelter Coordination Advisory Board.

Großmaß has focused on feminist issues since 1979, working together with Christiane Schmerl on the teaching research project Feminist Theory and the Category of Gender in the Social Sciences at the Faculty of Education at Bielefeld University.

In 2004, Großmaß was appointed Professor of Ethics and Action Theory at the Alice Salomon University of Applied Sciences Berlin.

Großmaß cites Niklas Luhmann, Michel Foucault and Pierre Bourdieu as her favorite authors.

== Works ==
- Ruth Großmaß, Gudrun Perko: Ethik für soziale Berufe, 2011. ISBN 978-3-8252-3566-6
- Ruth Großmaß, Christiane Schmerl: Feministischer Kompass, patriarchales Gepäck: Kritik konservativer Anteile in neueren feministischen Theorien, 1989. ISBN 978-3-593-34118-7
- Christiane Schmerl, Ruth Großmaß: Leitbilder, Vexierbilder und Bildstörungen: Über die Orientierungsleistung von Bildern in neueren feministischen Theorien, 1996. ISBN 978-3-593-35514-6
- Ruth Großmaß: Psychische Krisen und sozialer Raum: eine Sozialphänomenologie psychosozialer Beratung. ISBN 978-3-87159-702-2
- Ruth Großmaß, Edith Püschel: Beratung in der Praxis Konzepte und Fallbeispiele aus der Hochschulberatung, 2010. ISBN 978-3-87159-713-8
- Ruth Großmaß, Roland Anhorn: Kritik der Moralisierung theoretische Grundlagen–Diskurskritik–Klärungsvorschläge für die berufliche Praxis. 2013, ISBN 978-3-531-19462-2
