= Zikney Tzfat =

Israeli grunge/punk band

Zikney Tzfat (or “Elders Of Safed” in Hebrew) is a grunge / punk band formed in Tel Aviv, Israel around 1990 by Maor Cohen, Yoni Ben Tovim, Oren Lutenberg and Adiel Portugaly who was later replaced by Rea Mochiach. They were known for their wild and chaotic concerts and their extreme lyrics which were full with absurdist and childish humour.

== Description ==
In the period of their first album (simply titled Zikney Tzfat) their music was very noisy and influenced by American grunge bands like Killdozer and Butthole Surfers, and their lyrics were often vulgar and childish if not derogatory.

Their early songs often tackled controversial topics such as homosexuality, prostitution, drugs and Israeli politics albeit with vulgar and degrading lyrics.

Around 1994, the band, wanting to take a more radio friendly approach softened their explicit lyrics and noisy structures on their follow up also titled Zikney Tzfat (often called Zikney Tzfat 2 or The Blue Album);as a result, it was more successful commercially (It went gold) but critically it received mixed reviews. A notable song on the album title "Shishi Shabbat" (Friday-Sabbath) became a hit single in spite of the fact it only has 4 lines in its lyrics. In 1995 they released two more albums (Ten Li Shlager and Ten Li Shlager 2) which were more "Low Fi" in their nature and were musically more reminiscent of the first album. The band split in 1996.

In March 2014 after a film that was made about Zikney Tzfat's early years (HaAlbomim, channel 8) brought them all together again, the four band members went to the studio and recorded "Lo Hayu Dvarim Meolam", a mad hypnotic psychedelic rock album with a rough uninhibited sound and approach - despite a twenty-year gap, it is a direct and logical follow-on from their original album.

== Recent activities ==
Cohen continues to make music as a solo artist, Lutenberg is playing guitar with some of the leading musicians in Israel (Berry Sakharof amongst them), Mochiach was playing with Gogol Bordello and David Byrne amongst others and continues to make music and Ben tovim is a film maker based in London. Other musicians who played in the band in various periods are: Tom Mochiach and Yuval Kiner , Guy Amir and Aviv Pappo.

== Discography ==
LPs all released by NMC:

- Zikney Tzfat - 1992
- Zikney Tzfat 2 - 1994
- Ten Li Shlager - 1995
- Ten Li Shlager 2 - 1996

LPs released by Anova Music:

- Lo Hayu Dvarim Meolam - 2014
