= Metal-coated crystal =

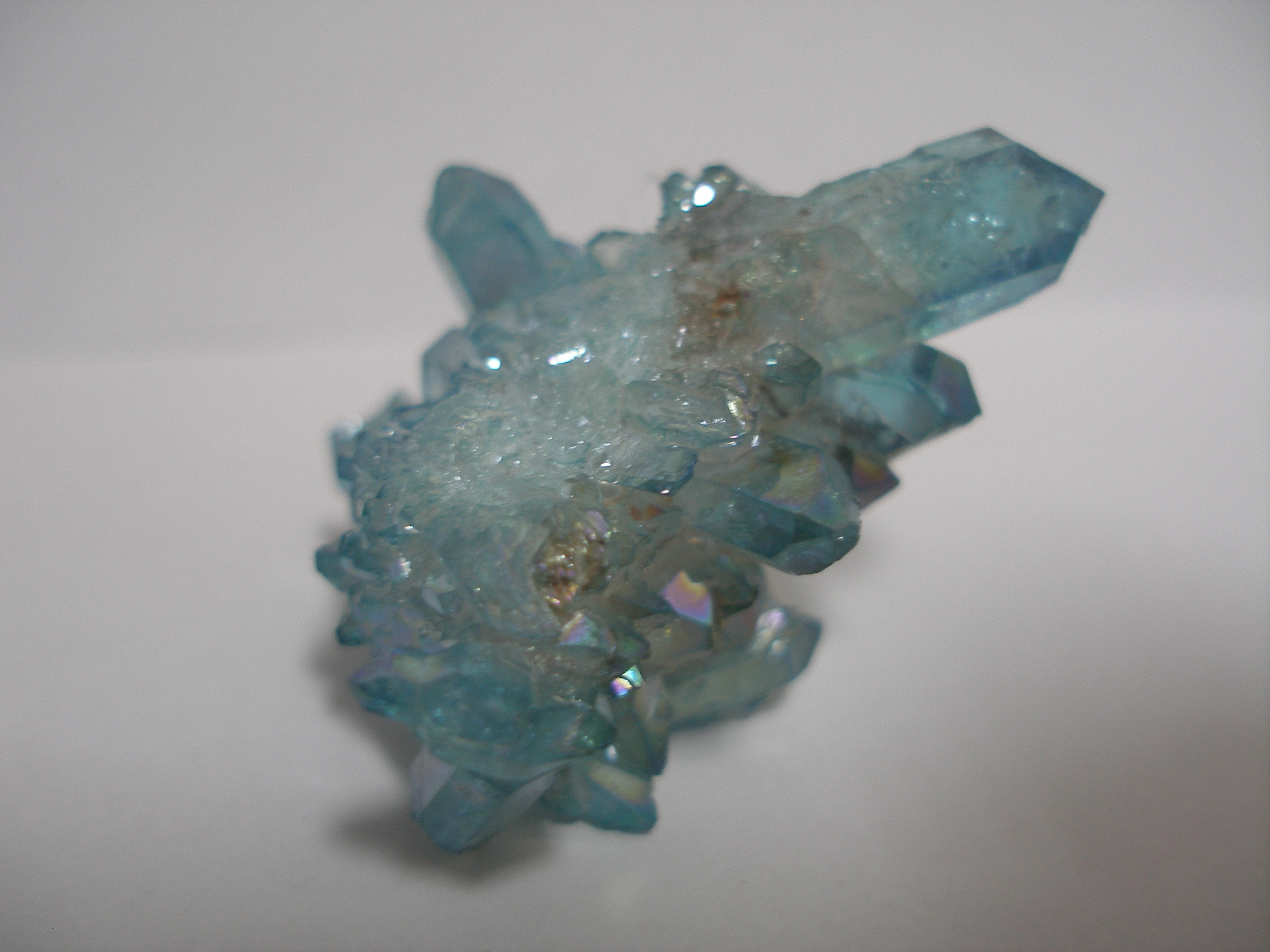
Aqua aura, crystals coated with gold fumes

A flame aura pendant set in silver.

Metal-coated crystals are artificial products made by coating crystals, such as quartz, with metal to give them an iridescent metallic sheen. Crystals treated this way are used as gemstones and for other decorative purposes. Possible coatings include gold, indium, titanium, niobium, and copper. Other names for crystals treated in this way include aqua aura, angel aura, flame aura, opal aura, or rainbow quartz.

== Production ==
Such products are created in a vacuum chamber by vapour deposition. Quartz is heated to 871 °C in vacuum, and golden wire is heated to even higher temperature, either by resistive heating with direct electrical current, or by magnetron. Gold sublimation (phase transition) occurs, the resulting vapor depositing onto the crystal's surface.

When viewed under a gemological microscope in diffused direct transmitted light, aqua aura displays the following properties:

- A coppery surface iridescence in tangential illumination.
- Diffused dark outlines of some facet junctions.
- A patchy blue colour distribution on some facets.
- White facet junctions, irregular white abrasions and surface pits, where the treatment either did not "take" or had been abraded away.

The brilliant color of these products is the result of optical interference effects produced by layers of metal.

== In culture ==
The American animated series Steven Universe has two characters named Rainbow Quartz, the fusion of two distinct Gem characters. The first Rainbow Quartz, introduced in 2015, is the fusion of Pearl and Rose Quartz. The second Rainbow Quartz, introduced in the 2019 finale "Change Your Mind", is the fusion of Pearl and Steven.

== See also ==
- Rhinestone
