= Ruth Dolores Weiss =

Israeli singer and songwriter

Ruth Dolores Weiss רות דולורס וייס
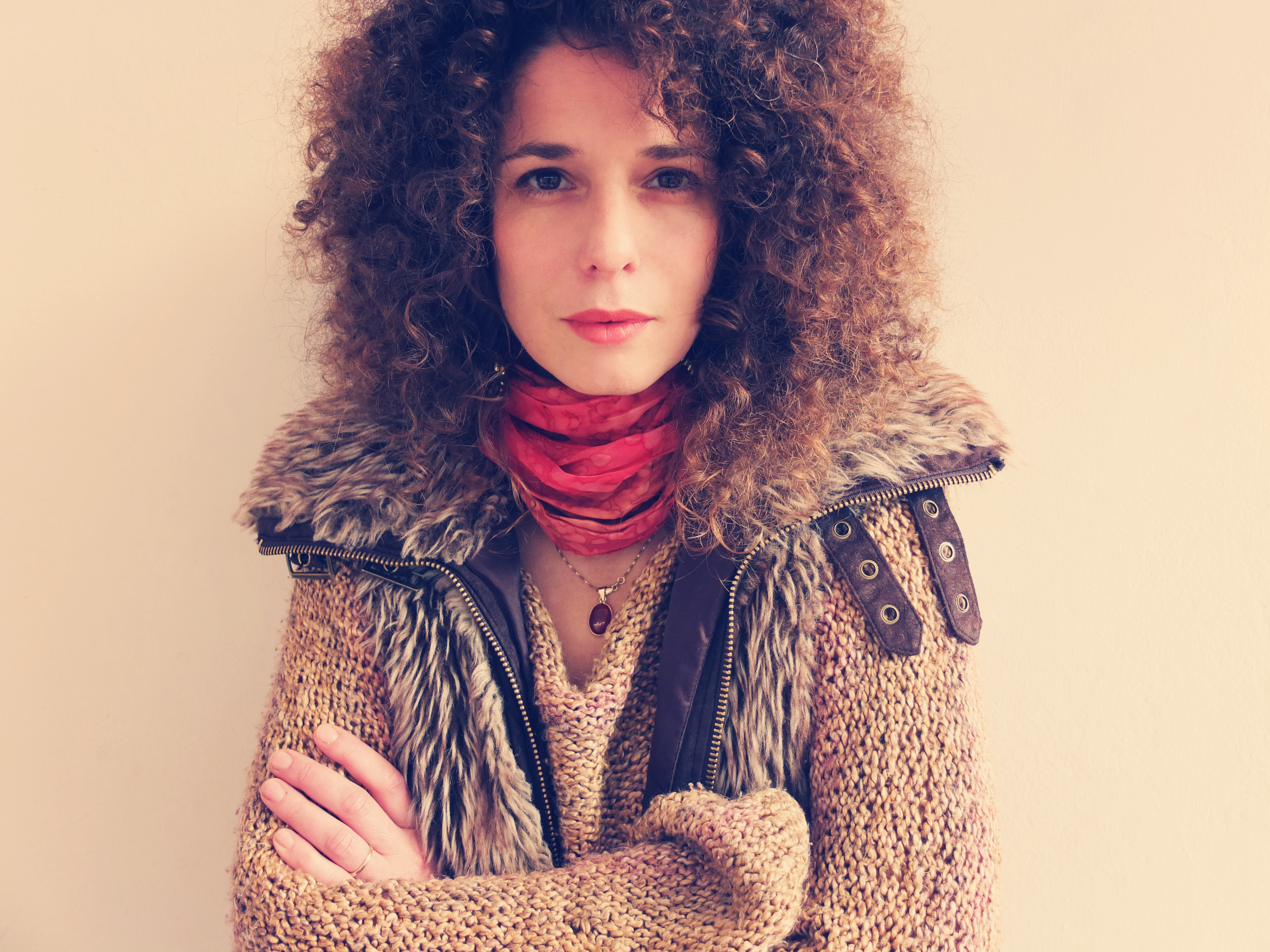
- Ruth Dolores Weiss. 2014

Background information
- Born: February 23, 1978 (age 48)
- Origin: Ashkelon, Israel
- Occupations: vocalist, pianist, composer
- Instruments: vocalist, pianist
- Label: Anova Music

Ruth Dolores Weiss (Hebrew: רות דולורס וייס; born February 23, 1978, in Ashkelon, Israel) is an Israeli musician. She released her second studio album, Be'Ivrit (literally, "In Hebrew"), to critical acclaim in Israel in August 2008. Ben Shalev, Israel's top music critic, writing about the album in Haaretz, said, "Amazing. There is no other word to describe the encounter with the voice, talent, sensitivity, emotion and spirit of Ruth Dolores Weiss." Another Israeli music critic, David Peretz, one of the first to hear Weiss' songs, said it was like discovering Billie Holiday or Björk in Ashkelon, her hometown. Weiss' previous album, Come See (Raw Versions), was released in 2004.

Weiss lived in Austin, Texas, for a few years before releasing Be'Ivrit, but returned to live in Israel with her family to tour, perform and record.

She also composed the soundtrack for the 2012 film Hayuta and Berl.

== Discography ==
- Come See (Raw Versions) (2004)
- In Hebrew (2008)
- My Middle Name is Misery (2011)
- In the Language of the People (2014)
