= Supermarket (Rockfour album) =

Studio album by Rockfour
- Released: 26 September 2000
- Genre: Psychedelic rock, Progressive rock
- Length: 42:28
- Label: Orchard, Earsay
- Producer: Eli Hayun

Rockfour chronology
Rockfour Behofa'a (1999)	Supermarket (2000)	One Fantastic Day (2001)

Singles from Supermarket
- 1. "Wild Animals" Released: 2000; 2. "Superman" Released: 2000

Professional ratings
Review scores
Source	Rating
Allmusic	4/5 stars

Supermarket is a studio album by the Israeli rock band, Rockfour. Released in September 2000, Supermarket is the band's first English album.

== Track listing ==
No.	Title	Length
1.	"Government"	5:12
2.	"Forest Woods"	3:07
3.	"Superman"	5:10
4.	"Wild Animals"	3:34
5.	"Powers"	3:21
6.	"Route 66"	5:57
7.	"Supermarket"	5:47
8.	"Oranges"	3:37
9.	"She's Full of Fears"	6:43

== Personnel ==
- Eli LuLai – acoustic guitar, vocals
- Marc Lazare – bass guitar
- Baruch Ben Yitzhak – guitar, mellotron
- Issar Tennenbaum – drums, percussion
- Noam Rapaport – mellotron, piano
- Eldad Guata – keyboard
- Eli Hayun – producer
