= Ruth Anderson (accountant) =

British accountant

Moreen Ruth Anderson CVO FCA (born 1954) is a British accountant who was the first woman board member of a top-four accounting firm KPMG, and became Vice Chairman of KPMG prior to a successful transition into a role as a FTSE Non-executive director and Charitable trustee.

== Early years ==
Anderson grew up in Enniskillen, Northern Ireland. She earned an honours degree in French and Spanish at University of Bradford.

== Business ==
Anderson joined KPMG in 1976 and became a partner in 1989. She was appointed to the board in 1998 and promoted to Vice Chairman in 2005 retiring from KPMG in 2009.

She was appointed non-executive director of Ocado in March 2010 and appointed non-executive director of Travis Perkins PLC on 24 October 2011. On 16 April 2014 she was appointed a non-executive director of Coats Group PLC. She is a Fellow of the Institute of Chartered Accountants in England and Wales and member of the Chartered Institute of Taxation.

== Charitable ==
She was appointed to the board of the Royal Parks in 2008.

Appointed a trustee of the Duke of Edinburgh's Award she has been a member of the DofE's Women in Business Group since its foundation in 2003 She was appointed Commander of the Royal Victorian Order (CVO) in the 2020 New Year Honours for services to the Duke of Edinburgh's Award.

== Articles and publications ==
- Thriving in a diverse business world
