= Ruth Anderson (American politician) =

American politician (died 2000)

Member of the Connecticut House of Representatives from Cromwell
- In office 1957–1959
- Preceded by: Nellie Ahlberg
- Succeeded by: Violet A. Frost

Personal details
- Born: 1894 or 1895 West Baldwin, Maine, U.S.
- Died: June 16, 2000 (aged 105)
- Party: Republican
- Spouse: Harry J. Anderson
- Children: 1
- Education: Bates College

Ruth Leah Anderson (died June 16, 2000) was an American politician who served in the Connecticut House of Representatives from 1957 to 1959, representing the town of Cromwell as a Republican.

== Personal life ==
Anderson was born in West Baldwin, Maine. She graduated from Bates College in 1916. She was married to Harry J. Anderson, and the couple ran a flower shop in New York City before moving to Cromwell, Connecticut, in 1953. They had a daughter together.

Anderson died on June 16, 2000, at the age of 105.

== Political career ==
Anderson was elected to the Connecticut House of Representatives in 1956 and served one term representing the town of Cromwell as a Republican. She ran for reelection in 1958, but was defeated by Democratic candidate Violet A. Frost.
