= Ruth Myers =

Ruth Myers may refer to:

- Ruth A. Myers (1921–2001), American teacher
- Ruth Myers (costume designer) (born 1940), British costume designer
- Ruth Myers (sculptor), artist in residence with the Southland Art Foundation
- Ruth Myers, first wife of Ellis Cunliffe Lister
