= Ruth Blum =

Swiss writer and journalist (1913–1975)

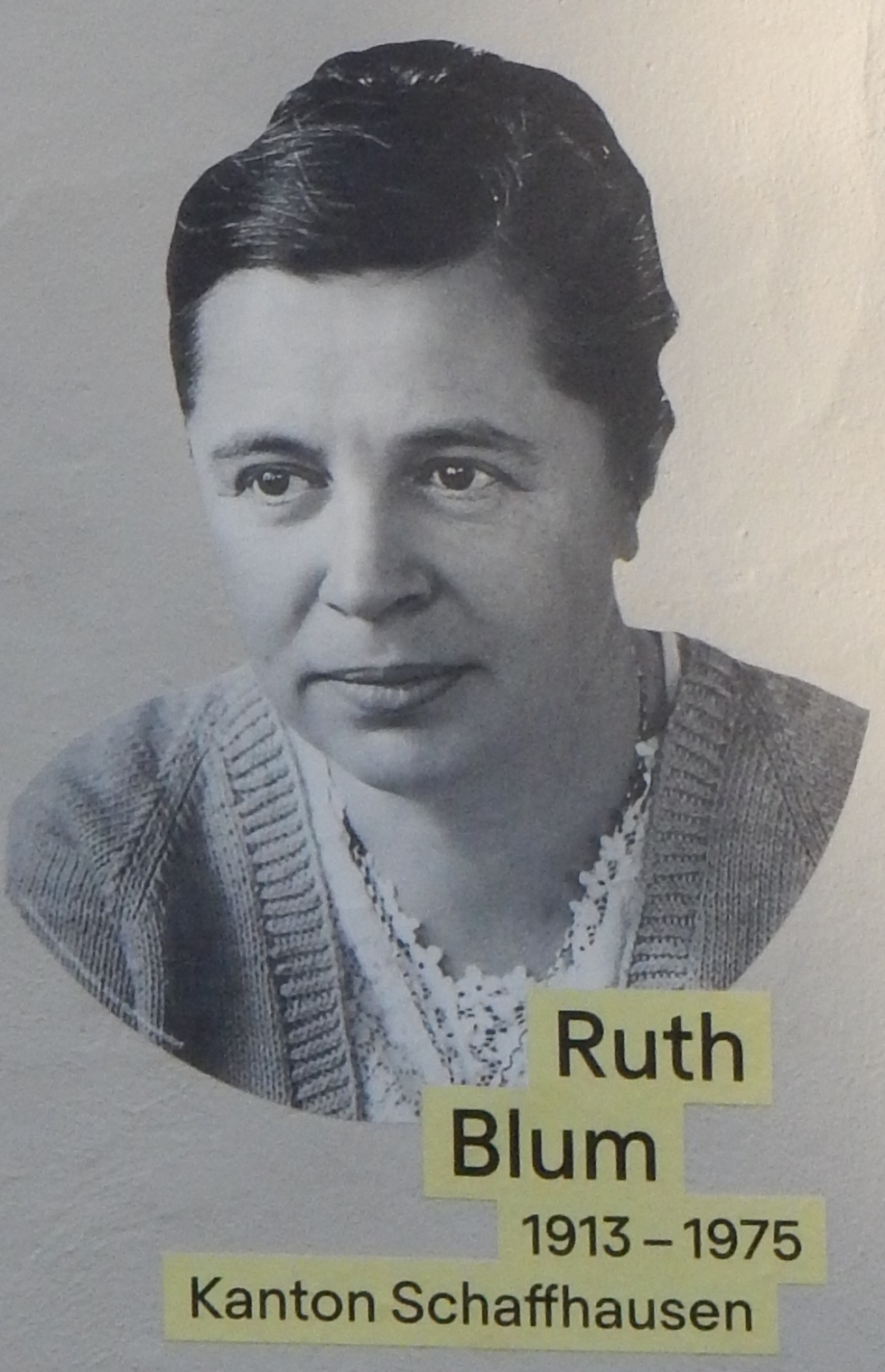
Image of Ruth Blum

Ruth Blum (2 September 1913, in Wilchingen – 2 August 1975, in Schaffhausen) was a Swiss writer and journalist, best remembered for her novels Blauer Himmel, grüne Erde (1941), Der gekrönte Sommer (1945), Der Gottestrauch (1953), Und es erhub sich ein Streit (1964), and Mein Feuergesicht (1967).
