= Ruth Millington =

English art historian

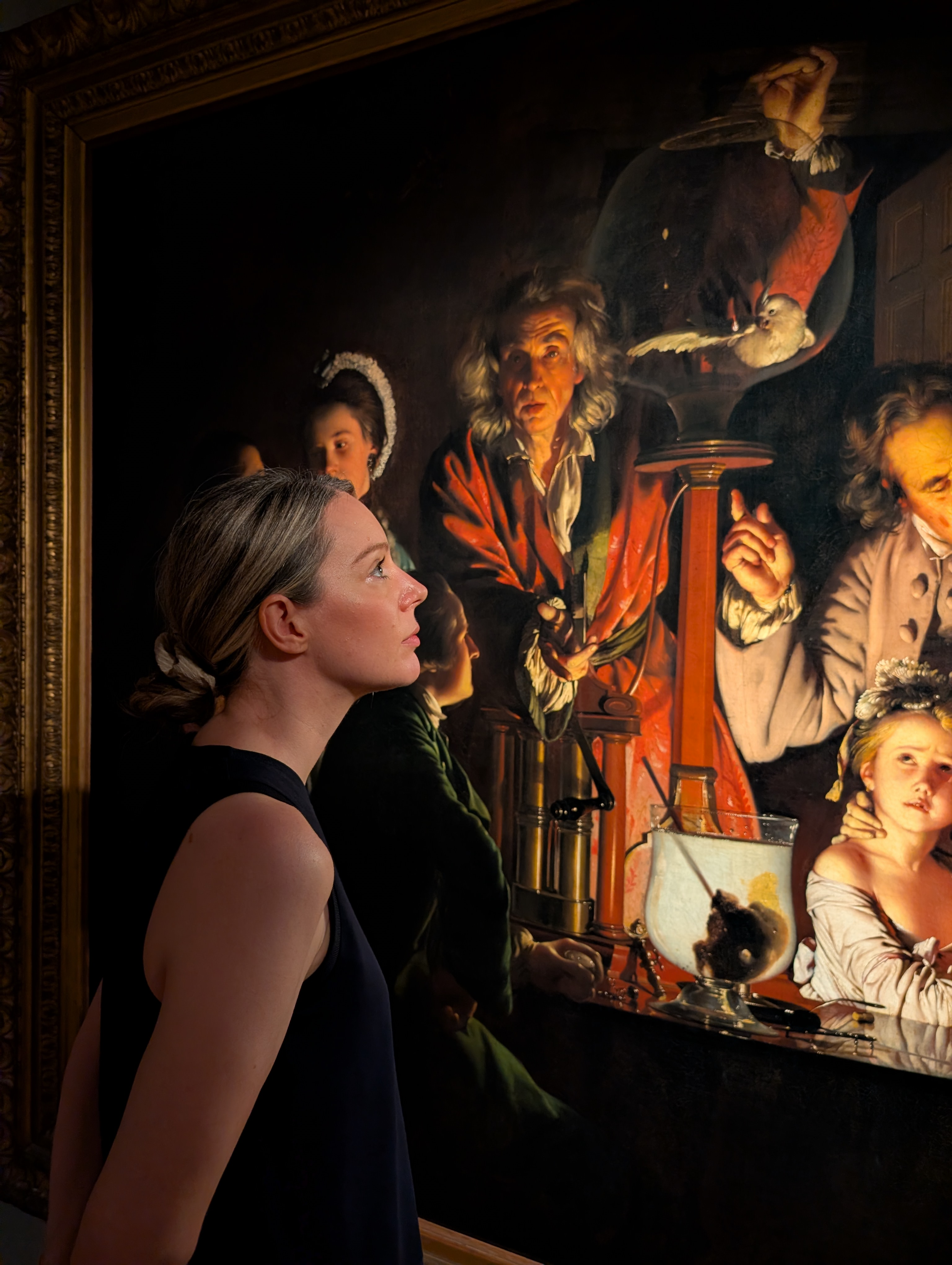
Derby Museums, 2026

Ruth Millington (born c. 1986/1987) is an English art historian, author, curator and broadcaster.

== Early life and education ==
Millington moved around growing up for her parents' work. Millington attended the Yarlet School and Repton School. She went on to graduate from Durham University and complete a Master's in modern and contemporary art at Lady Margaret Hall, Oxford.

== Career ==
Millington, an art historian, spent five years working for museums and galleries across the UK, including the Ashmolean Museum of Art and Archaeology, the Estorick Collection of Modern Italian Art and Connaught Brown.

Millington is the author of Muse, which explored the true stories of 30 muses, including Dora Maar, Elizabeth Siddal, George Dyer and Peter Schlesinger.

Her 2024 children’s book This Book Will Make You An Artist has won four awards including the UK’s only award for creative educational writing alongside illustrator Ellen Surrey.

Her next children’s book is The Science of Art.

Millington has contributed to TIME, The Independent, the Telegraph, and Dazed, covering a diverse range of artistic subjects and is also a regular contributor to Art UK. She has hosted or co-hosted programmes on BBC Radio, including Painting with Scissors.

She featured in the 2020 Sky Arts documentary Cold War Steve Meets The Outside World.

Millington regularly lectures on art history and has spoken at The Holburne Museum, the University of Oxford and Sotheby’s Institute of Art where she was Head of the Careers Service.

Millington also works with a variety of modern artists' estates, including Emmy Bridgwater, Peter Phillips and Eric Tucker.

== Bibliography ==
- Muse: Uncovering the Hidden Figures Behind Art History's Masterpieces (2022)
- Art Brum: Birmingham's Art Story in 50 Masterpieces (2022)
- This Book Will Make You An Artist (2024)
- The Science of Art (2026)
