= Anova Music =

Israeli independent record label

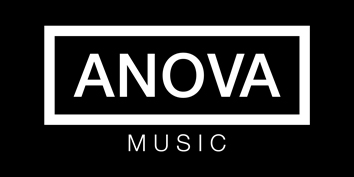
- Founded: 2006
- Distributor(s): AWAL
- Genre: Alternative rock, indie rock, indie pop, Pop, Indie folk
- Country of origin: Israel
- Location: Tel Aviv
- Official website: www.anovamusic.com

Anova Music is an Israeli independent record label founded in 2006, by Shuki Goldwasser and Anat Damon in Tel Aviv, Israel. They have signed bands such as Vaadat Charigim, Nikmat HaTraktor, Rockfour and more artists on their roster. In 2013, Anova Music started a sub label by the name of BLDG5 Records that specializes in electronic music. Walla! referred to the label as "one of the most prominent alternative labels in Israel".

== Anova Studios ==
Anova studios were founded in January 2006 in Tel Aviv, Israel.

== Artists ==
- Chanan Ben Simon
- Efrat Ben Zur
- lessAcrobats
- Lola Marsh
- Rockfour
- Soda Fabric
- Tiny Fingers
- Underwater Firemen
- Vaadat Charigim

== Past Artists ==
- Albert Beger
- Amit Erez
- Bney Hama
- Danski
- Eatliz
- Electra (Israeli band)
- Eli Rozen
- Itamar Ziegler
- Izabo
- Kitzu
- Nili Fink
- Nikmat HaTraktor
- Noa Babayof
- Nosei Hamigbaat
- The Secret Sea
- Ruth Dolores Weiss
- Uzi Navon and Acquaintances
- Yair Yona
- Yuppies With Jeeps
- Zikney Tzfat
- Totemo

== Deluxe Editions ==
Starting in 2008, Anova Music has released Deluxe Editions of their top-selling albums, which features the remastered album as well as some live tracks. The albums with Deluxe Editions are Electra's Second Hand Love, Nosei Hamigbaat's Nosei Hamigbaat, Nikmat HaTraktor Ma Le'ahuvee and more.

== See also ==
- List of record labels
