= Ruth E. Thomas =

Ruth Elma Thomas (November 19, 1926 – November 23, 2020) was an educator and community leader in St. Thomas, United States Virgin Islands.

== Early life and education ==
Ruth E. Thomas was born in 1926, a product of Kogens Quarter, also known as the Upstreet neighborhood, a district of Charlotte Amalie, St. Thomas. After graduating from Charlotte Amalie High School, she attended the City College of New York and later transferred to Fisk University, where she graduated with a B.A in English in 1949. She earned an M.S in linguistics in 1957 and Education Specialist degree in secondary school administration in 1970, both from the University of Michigan at Ann Arbor.

== Career and later life ==
Thomas began teaching at Charlotte Amalie High School in 1949. As an English teacher and later as principal, she taught people including Orville Kean, the third president of the University of the Virgin Islands, Jeanette Smith-Barry, principal of Charlotte Amalie High School, and Gilbert Sprauve, a University of the Virgin Islands professor of linguistics. She was a part-time faculty member of the University of the Virgin Islands and served as a member of its Board of Trustees.

She retired as principal of Charlotte Amalie High School in 1982, after a total of 33 years there. After retirement, she remained involved in the advancement and improvement of the United States Virgin Islands community. She was a member of the Virgin Islands Partners for Health and the League of Women Voters. She was a board member of the Girl Scouts and the Community Foundation of the Virgin Islands. Thomas also helped to begin the Thomas-Skelton-Stout group, a collaboration of her extended families, which awards yearly scholarships.

Thomas died on November 23, 2020, at the age of 94.

== Honors and legacy ==
The Virgin Islands legislature named the Charlotte Amalie High School auditorium for Thomas in 1998. In 2017, she was awarded an honorary doctorate from the University of the Virgin Islands. The Virgin Islands Board of Education created a special legislative grant, 190z. Ruth E. Thomas Scholarship Fund for Teacher Education, that provides financial support to United States Virgin Islands educators pursuing graduate studies in elementary or secondary education.
