= Ruth Anderson (lawyer) =

Scottish lawyer

Ruth Anderson KC is a Scottish lawyer whose expertise is criminal law.

She was admitted as a solicitor in 1972, and as an advocate in 1991, taking silk in 1999. Her practice at the Bar has been principally a criminal one, defending in the High Court of Justiciary. She also served as an Advocate Depute from 1998 until January 2001. Anderson has had local government experience and has also worked in private practice as a solicitor. She was appointed a part-time Sheriff in May 2003 and a full-time sheriff in September 2006.

Anderson owns a bookshop in Wigtown, named Well-Read Books of Wigtown.

== SCCRC ==
Ruth Anderson KC has been a Board Member of the Scottish Criminal Cases Review Commission (SCCRC) since 1 January 2002. The SCCRC is currently conducting a review of the conviction of Abdelbaset al-Megrahi in the Pan Am Flight 103 bombing trial. The commission is expected to complete the review and announce its conclusions in the first half of 2007.
