= Ruth Weckenmann =

German politician (born 1959)

Ruth Weckenmann (born 3 June 1959 in Stuttgart) is a politician of the SPD and was a member of the State Parliament of Baden-Württemberg from 2001 to 2006.

== Life ==
Weckenmann completed her A-levels in Stuttgart. She then studied at the University of Konstanz Administrative Sciences.

From 1987 to 1998, she worked for the DGB, most recently as deputy state chairwoman of Baden-Württemberg, where she was responsible for the labour market, women's and family policy, pension issues and media policy. After the birth of her son, she attended the Führungsakademie des Landes Baden-Württemberg. In her final project, she developed proposals for the division of management positions in the state administration.

From 1999 to 2001, she worked at the Baden-Württemberg Federal Employment Agency as Head of the Labour Market and Women's Policy Unit. After becoming a member of the state parliament, she worked as head of the Equal Opportunities on the Labour Market staff unit at the Baden-Württemberg Regional Directorate of the Federal Employment Agency.

Ruth Weckenmann is married.

== Political career ==
In 1988, she joined the SPD. From 1995 to 1999, she was a member of the SPD state executive and the SPD executive committee in Baden-Württemberg. In the state parliamentary election 2001, she was elected to the state parliament via a second mandate in the constituency Stuttgart II, she had a seat on the Economic Committee and one on the Standing Committee. From 2011 to 2006, she was employment policy spokesperson for the SPD state parliamentary group. She was responsible for employment policy in the parliamentary group economic policy. She was responsible for debt counselling and media policy in the SPD parliamentary group for law and constitution. In the state election 2006, she failed to enter parliament. In the state election 2011, she stood in the constituency of Stuttgart III, but again failed to win a seat.

== Voluntary work ==
She works in an honorary capacity as Rundfunkratin at SWR, as chairwoman of the radio committee, as a board member of the foundation Zeit für Menschen (Samariterstiftung), as a member of the board of trustees of Evangelische Heimstiftung, as a board member of AWO Stuttgart, and as a member of the Bad Boll board of trustees.

== Honours ==
- 2011: Cross of Merit on Ribbon of the Federal Republic of Germany

== Literature ==
- Ina Hochreuther: Frauen im Parlament. Südwestdeutsche Parlamenarierinnen von 1919 bis heute, Stuttgart 2012 ISBN 978-3-923476-16-9, p. 271f.
