= Ruth Holzhausen =

German volleyball player (born 1959)

Personal information
- Full name: Ruth Holzhausen-Malkus
- Nationality: German
- Born: September 29, 1959 (age 67); Berlin, Germany
- Height: 179 cm (5 ft 10 in)

Ruth Holzhausen (born September 29, 1959) is a retired female volleyball player from Germany, who competed for West Germany at the 1984 Summer Olympics in Los Angeles, United States. There finished sixth with the national squad after a 3-0 loss in the fifth place playoff against South Korea. She is the mother of German long-jumper Lena Malkus.
