= How to Be Shy =

Studio album by Shy Nobleman
- Released: June 20, 2001
- Recorded: 2001
- Genre: Indie rock, psychedelic pop
- Length: 38:10
- Label: Noble Tunes
- Producer: Shy Nobleman, Baruch Ben Yitzhak

Shy Nobleman chronology
How to Be Shy (2001)	Beautiful Life (2005)

Singles from Beautiful Life
- 1. "Lonely Boy"; 2. "Sad Song Happy Song"

How to Be Shy is the debut studio album by Israeli indie rock artist Shy Nobleman, released on June 20, 2001.

Nobleman's backing band on the record is Israeli psychedelic rock band Rockfour. The album was produced by Shy Nobleman himself, and Rockfour singer Baruch Ben Yitzhak.

The album became successful in Israel and worldwide, becoming a Top 10 album in Israel and appearing on Rolling Stone magazine's Critics’ Top Albums of 2001 list. The album brings musical influences from various genres such as psychedelic rock, psychedelic pop, blues, folk and 60's pop.

Two singles were released from the album: "Lonely Boy" and "Sad Song Happy Song".

== Track listing ==
No.	Title	Length
1.	"No More"	4:05
2.	"Lonely Boy"	3:25
3.	"Power Pop Symphony"	4:06
4.	"Cats"	1:56
5.	"Don't Want to Say Goodnight"	4:09
6.	"Sad Song Happy Song"	2:57
7.	"Spring B# (Stevie Winwood)"	3:20
8.	"Mr. Kluger"	3:31
9.	"Fireworks Tonight"	3:28
10.	"Nightmare"	3:31
11.	"Really Have to Go"	3:43
Total length:		38:10

== Personnel ==
- Shy Nobleman - lead vocals, rhythm guitar, piano, organ
- Baruch Ben Yitzhak - lead guitar, bass, backing vocals
- Marc Lazare - bass, backing vocals
- Issar Tennenbaum - drums, percussion

Additional personnel

- Rob Whitmore - bass
- Roy Hadas - bass
- Kfir Kaper - brass instruments
- Tom Lewis - brass instruments
- Barak Ravid - brass instruments
- Uri Baum - brass instruments
- The Kaleidoscope Quintet - strings
- Eli Lulai - backing vocals
- Nan Wisse - backing vocals
- Asaf Talmudi - string arrangement
- Eran Sahar - string arrangement

Production

- Shy Nobleman - production
- Baruch Ben Yitzhak - production
- Ronan Tal - engineering
- Liam Watson - engineering
- Gadi Pugatsch - engineering
- Oren Ben Simon - cover art
- Hadar Kaplan - cover art
