= Shy Nobleman =

Israeli musical artist

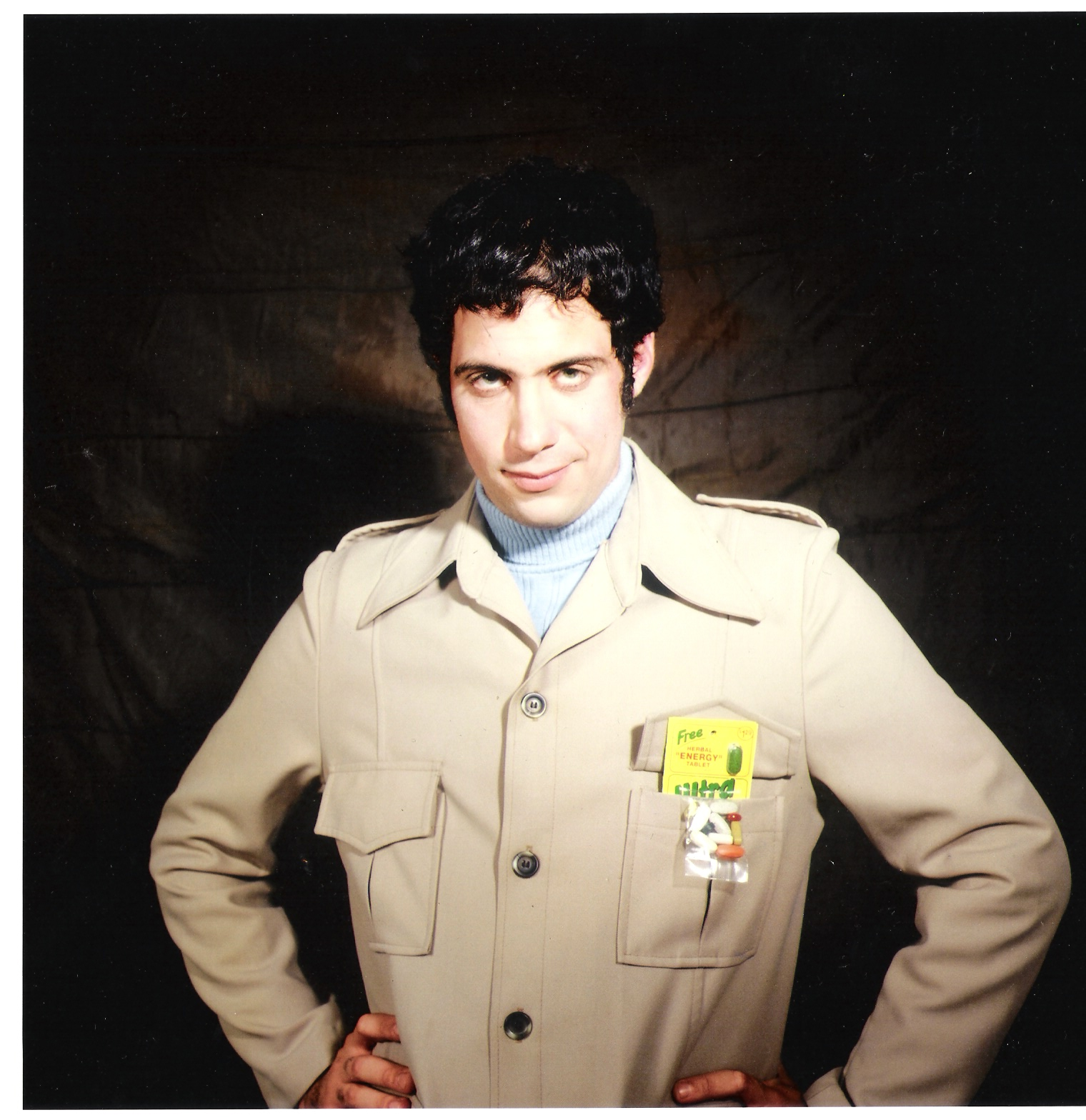

Background information
- Also known as: שי נובלמן
- Born: July 2, 1974 (age 52)
- Origin: Ramat Gan, Israel
- Genres: Indie rock, psychedelic rock, power pop, neo-psychedelia
- Occupations: Singer, songwriter, actor
- Instruments: Guitar, vocals, bass, keyboards, piano
- Years active: 1991–present
- Website: Shy Nobleman.co.il

Shy Nobleman (Hebrew: שי נובלמן; born July 2, 1974) is an Israeli rock musician, singer, songwriter, producer, keyboardist, guitarist and sports broadcaster.

== Discography ==
=== Solo albums ===
- 2001 – How to Be Shy
- 2005 – Beautiful Life
- 2013 – My Day is a Dream (Yomi Hu Halom Hebrew album)
- 2021 - ‘The Killing Angel’ (single)
