= State Is Burning =

Studio album by Useless ID
- Released: July 1, 2016
- Recorded: December 3–19, 2015, at the Blasting Room, Fort Collins, Colorado
- Genre: Punk rock, melodic hardcore, hardcore punk
- Length: 28:03
- Label: Fat Wreck (Worldwide); EarSay (Israel)
- Producer: Bill Stevenson, Jason Livermore

Useless ID chronology
We Don't Want the Airwaves (2016)	State Is Burning (2016)

Singles from State Is Burning
- 1. "We Don't Want the Airwaves" Released: April 15, 2016

State Is Burning is the eighth full-length studio album by Israeli punk band Useless ID. It was released on July 1, 2016, and is the band's second album and third release on Fat Wreck Chords. It was released more than 4 years after the band's previous album, Symptoms, marking the longest gap between two Useless ID albums. It was also preceded by a 7-inch EP for the album's first single "We Don't Want the Airwaves", which was released on May 6, 2016. Musically. the album is a return to the faster, more aggressive sound of earlier releases by the band.

It is the fourth album the band recorded at the Blasting Room in Fort Collins, Colorado, recorded December 3–19, 2015, with producers Bill Stevenson and Jason Livermore, and the band's first and only album with drummer Gideon Berger, who announced his departure during the album's release show on June 30, 2016.

The album's release show took place on June 30, 2016, a day before the album's official release, at the Barby Club in Tel Aviv, supported by hardcore/surf rock band Shifka Chiefs. During the band's performance, they were joined by Jamie Hilsden of Jerusalem based punk rock act Man Alive, to perform two songs, originally recorded by Man Alive.

== Singles ==
On April 15, 2016, the song "We Don't Want the Airwaves" was released as the first official single, through the Fat Wreck Chords YouTube channel. On April 20, 2016, the band announced on their Facebook page they'll be making a music video for the single, which will be composed of fan footage that will be sent to them by fans, giving tribute to the Ramones, as the song is the band's tribute to the Ramones.

On June 10, 2016, the album's opening track "Land of Idiocracy" was streamed for free through the Fat Wreck Chords YouTube channel.

On July 25, 2016, the official music video for "We Don't Want the Airwaves" was released, through the Fat Wreck Chords official YouTube channel. The video is a compilation of photos and short videos, referencing and paying tribute to the Ramones, that were made by fans and sent to Useless ID, then edited together by the band, along with homage pictures by the band members themselves.

== Track listing ==
No.	Title	Length
1.	"Land of Idiocracy"	0:59
2.	"Stopwatch"	1:21
3.	"Borrowed Time"	2:25
4.	"How to Dismantle an Atom Bomb"	2:18
5.	"Creation"	2:18
6.	"Genetic"	1:21
7.	"State Is Burning"	2:22
8.	"Novice"	2:08
9.	"Lonely Man"	1:33
10.	"Night Shift"	1:49
11.	"45 Seconds"	0:46
12.	"Without a Choice"	0:40
13.	"Detune"	1:52
14.	"We Don't Want the Airwaves"	2:28
15.	"Closer to the Edge"	3:36

== Personnel ==
- Yotam Ben Horin - lead vocals, bass
- Ishay Berger - lead guitar, backing vocals
- Guy Carmel - rhythm guitar, vocals
- Gideon Berger - drums, percussion

Production

- Bill Stevenson - production, engineering, arrangement
- Jason Livermore - production, engineering, mastering
- Adi Khavous - photography
