= The Lost Broken Bones =

Studio album by Useless ID
- Released: July 23, 2008
- Recorded: January–February 2008 at the Blasting Room, Fort Collins, Colorado
- Genre: Punk rock, alternative rock, pop punk
- Length: 36:05
- Label: Suburban Home (Worldwide); Bullion (Japan); EarSay (Israel)
- Producer: Bill Stevenson, Jason Livermore

Useless ID chronology
Redemption (2005)	The Lost Broken Bones (2008)	Symptoms (2012)

Professional ratings
Review scores
Source	Rating
AbsolutePunk.net	(78%)
Bombshellzine.com	8/10 stars
Sputnikmusic	4/5 stars
The Punk Site	4/5 stars

The Lost Broken Bones is the sixth full-length studio album by Israeli punk band Useless ID. It is the band's first album on the Suburban Home label, and was released in Japan on July 23, 2008, through the Bullion label, and on October 18, 2008, in the rest of the world, in a special release show in Tel Aviv, Israel. Special guests at the Israeli release show included Danny Sanderson, Muki, Avital Tamir of Betzefer and Sha'anan Streett of Hadag Nahash.

Like their previous album, it was also recorded at the Blasting Room in Colorado and produced by punk drummer and producer Bill Stevenson.

The first single from the album was "Blood Pressure" which was released in August 2008 in Japan and on the band's Myspace page and on September 8, 2008, in Israel.

The album was also pressed on vinyl via Suburban Home Records. The CD version released via Suburban Home also included a copy of the band's 2006 DVD, Ratfaces Home Videos Presents Useless ID.

It is also the band's first album with drummer Jonathan Harpak (although he was also credited on the band's previous album, he did not play on it).

July 24, 2015 album was re-released by band current label Fat Wreck Records with seven bonus tracks.

== Track listing ==
All music is composed by Yotam Ben Horin.

No.	Title	Writer(s)	Length
1.	"Isolate Me"	Yotam Ben Horin	3:31
2.	"Killing a Ghost"	Ishay Berger, Guy Carmel, Jonathan Harpak	2:49
3.	"Mouse In a Maze"	Ishay Berger, Guy Carmel, Jonathan Harpak	2:33
4.	"Undecided"	Yotam Ben Horin	3:06
5.	"Blood Pressure"	Yotam Ben Horin	2:46
6.	"Shallow End"	Yotam Ben Horin	3:34
7.	"Night Stalker"	Yotam Ben Horin	3:29
8.	"Always the Same"	Yotam Ben Horin	2:47
9.	"Misconception"	Ishay Berger, Guy Carmel, Jonathan Harpak	2:26
10.	"Already Dead"	Yotam Ben Horin	1:37
11.	"Give It Up"	Yotam Ben Horin	3:31
12.	"One Way Down"	Yotam Ben Horin	3:52

Re-issue Bonus Tracks
No.	Title	Length
13.	"What Are the Odds?"	2:41
14.	"Dissolve"	2:00
15.	"Fading Out"	3:20
16.	"X On Revolution"	2:35
17.	"My Alter Ego"	2:59
18.	"Show Time"	3:50
19.	"Unpopular Again"	2:26

== Personnel ==
- Yotam Ben-Horin - lead vocals, bass
- Ishay Berger - lead guitar, acoustic guitar, backing vocals
- Guy Carmel - rhythm guitar, backing vocals
- Jonathan Harpak - drums, percussion, keyboards, backing vocals

Additional musicians

- Stephen Egerton - lead guitar on "Isolate Me"
- Saul Eshet - organ (spooky hamond intro) on "Night Stalker"
- Yonatan Lev - noises (Crumble noise intro) on "Night Stalker"

Production

- Bill Stevenson - producer, engineer, mixing
- Jason Livermore - producer, engineer, mixing, mastering
- Andrew Berlin - engineering

== Release history ==
Country	Date
Japan	July 23, 2008
Israel	October 18, 2008
United States	October 18, 2008
