= Wolves in Wolves' Clothing =

Studio album by NOFX
- Released: April 18, 2006
- Studio: Motor, San Francisco
- Genre: Punk rock, melodic hardcore
- Length: 46:17
- Label: Fat Wreck Chords
- Producer: Bill Stevenson, Jason Livermore, Fat Mike

NOFX chronology
| Never Trust a Hippy (2006) | Wolves in Wolves' Clothing (2006) | They've Actually Gotten Worse Live! (2007) |

Professional ratings
Review scores
| Source | Rating |
|---|---|
| AllMusic | 3/5 stars |
| Robert Christgau | (2-star Honorable Mention) |
| Kerrang! | 4/5 stars |
| Punknews.org | 3.5/5 stars |

Wolves in Wolves' Clothing is the tenth studio album by the American punk rock band NOFX. At 46 minutes, this is NOFX's longest studio album.

== Release ==
In February and March 2006, NOFX embarked on headlining US tour, with support from the Lawrence Arms and the Loved Ones. On March 20, 2006, the album's artwork and track listing was posted online; "100 Times Fuckeder" appeared on April 10, 2006. Three days later, a music video for "Seeing Double at the Triple Rock" was posted on the band's Myspace profile. Wolves in Wolves' Clothing was made available for streaming through AOL Music on April 17, 2006, being released the following day through Fat Wreck Chords. The band went on the 2006 Warped Tour, and following this, they appeared at the Flip the Switch festival in Canada. In September and October 2006, they toured across South America, and appeared at the Corona Music Fest in Mexico. Two of the planned shows had to be cancelled because of issues with the promoter; another shows was cancelled upon the arrival of riot police.

In January 2007, the band went on a tour of California alongside Strike Anywhere, Dead to Me and Love Equals Death. Following this, they toured New Zealand and Australia, then visited Japan and Taiwan in April 2007. In August and September 2007, the band toured Europe with the Mad Caddies, and then a few dates in Israel with Useless ID, Man Alive, Kill the Drive, and the Testicles. A second European leg followed by a short tour of South Africa, with support from the Loved Ones. In February and March 2008, the band appeared on the Fat Tour, alongside No Use for a Name and the Flatliners, and appeared at the South by Southwest music conference. They went on the second leg of the Fat Tour with No Use for a Name and American Steel in May 2008. Following this, they performed at the Quebec City Music Festival in Canada.

== Track listing ==
All tracks are written by Fat Mike.

| No. | Title | Length |
|---|---|---|
| 1. | "60%" | 2:25 |
| 2. | "USA-holes" | 2:13 |
| 3. | "Seeing Double at the Triple Rock" | 2:09 |
| 4. | "We March to the Beat of Indifferent Drum" | 2:38 |
| 5. | "The Marxist Brothers" | 2:44 |
| 6. | "The Man I Killed" | 1:18 |
| 7. | "Benny Got Blowed Up" | 1:05 |
| 8. | "Leaving Jesusland" | 2:54 |
| 9. | "Getting High on the Down Low" | 1:13 |
| 10. | "Cool and Unusual Punishment" | 2:05 |
| 11. | "Wolves in Wolves' Clothing" | 1:57 |
| 12. | "Cantado en Español" | 1:26 |
| 13. | "100 Times Fuckeder" | 1:57 |
| 14. | "Instant Crassic" | 0:34 |
| 15. | "You Will Lose Faith" | 2:31 |
| 16. | "One Celled Creature" | 1:31 |
| 17. | "Doornails" | 2:14 |
| 18. | "60% (Reprise)" | 1:54 |
| 19. | "unlisted track" | 11:29 |
| Total length: | | 46:17 |

iTunes bonus track "Wolves In Wolves' Clothing (CD 2: Free Fat Sampler), 16 songs"
| No. | Title | Length |
|---|---|---|
| 20. | "Insulted by Germans... Again" | 2:38 |

== Personnel ==
Credits adapted from the album's liner notes.

NOFX

- Fat Mike – lead vocals, bass guitar, producer
- El Hefe – guitar, backing vocals
- Eric Melvin – guitar, backing vocals, additional engineering
- Erik Sandin – drums

Production

- Bill Stevenson – recording engineer, mixing engineer (tracks 1–6 and 10–19); producer (all tracks)
- Jason Livermore – recording engineer (tracks 1–6 and 10–19); producer, mixing engineer, audio mastering (all tracks)
- Adam Krammer – recording engineer (tracks 7–9)
- Andrew Berlin – additional engineering
- Jamie McMann – additional engineering

Additional credits

- Erica Pedersen – translating of "Cantado en Español"
- Brian Archer – artwork, layout, and design

== Charts ==
Chart performance for Wolves in Wolves' Clothing
| Chart (2006) | Peak position |
|---|---|
| Australian Albums (ARIA) | 23 |
| Austrian Albums (Ö3 Austria) | 46 |
| Canadian Albums (Nielsen SoundScan) | 19 |
| French Albums (SNEP) | 150 |
| German Albums (Offizielle Top 100) | 60 |
| Swiss Albums (Schweizer Hitparade) | 56 |
| UK Albums (OCC) | 119 |
| UK Independent Albums (OCC) | 9 |
| UK Rock & Metal Albums (OCC) | 2 |
| US Billboard 200 | 46 |
| US Independent Albums (Billboard) | 2 |
| US Indie Store Album Sales (Billboard) | 3 |
| US Top Rock Albums (Billboard) | 11 |
