= Kill the Drive =

Israeli four-piece punk rock band

Kill the Drive קיל דה דרייב
- Origin: Haifa, Israel
- Genres: Punk rock, skate punk, pop punk
- Years active: 2005–2015, 2023
- Labels: Broken English, Fond of Life
- Members: Eyal Reiner; Or Yaakov; Jonathan Shkedi; Gideon Berger
- Past members: Nadav Rotem; Lavy Josephson; Gal Pearlman; Yuval Segal

Kill the Drive (Hebrew: קיל דה דרייב) is an Israeli four-piece punk rock band, formed in Haifa, Israel in 2005. The band started as a skate punk trio and gained their first recognition releasing their third album Lady Karma on Broken English Records, in 2012.

== History ==
=== Formation and Roadkill (2005–2008) ===
The band was formed in the summer of 2005, in Haifa, Israel, as a skate/hardcore punk trio, with Eyal Reiner on lead vocals and bass, Yuval Segal on guitar, and Gideon Berger (younger brother of Useless ID's Ishay Berger) on drums and percussion, under the name Increase, though not long after formation, guitarist Yuval Segal decided to leave the band and was replaced with Lavy Josephson. Segal returned to the band not long after, and the band decided to stay as a four-piece with both Segal and Josephson on guitars. The band started playing live right away, playing their first live show at the Patiphone club in Tel Aviv. though their close connection to internationally known punk rock band Useless ID landed them many opening slots for Useless ID, as well as other big name Israeli bands such as Betzefer and Man Alive.

In September 2005, the band opened for Australian Jewish punk rock band Yidcore and Useless ID on their co-headlining tour of Israel, at the show that took place at the Barby club in Kfar Saba. Not long after, Segal has once again left the band, and the band stayed as a trio. They then decided to record their first demo tape Short Notice, which included 7 songs and was self-released in February 2006. The band celebrated the release of the demo, opening for Useless ID and Whorecore at the City Hall club in Haifa, on February 10, 2006.

On July 28, 2006, the band served once again as the opening act for Useless ID, along with ska punk band Cuban B, at the City Hall in Haifa.

On December 6, 2006, the band self-released their first full-length album studio album Roadkill. The album was available only through the band and through the website Interpunk. Following the release of the album, the band served as the opening act of the 3-date Betzefer vs. Useless ID Hanuka Tour, opening for Useless ID and Betzefer, along with supporting acts The Fading and This Means You. Shows took place in Tel Aviv, Haifa and Jerusalem.

In the summer of 2007, the band went on their first tour of the US, playing for two months, mainly in the West Coast. Returning from their US tour in September, the band opened for NOFX on their first Israeli tour, at the Haifa show on September 7, 2007. The band then continued playing many shows throughout Israel, mainly Tel Aviv and Haifa, though then guitarist Lavy Josephson has decided to quit, and was replaced by Gal Pearlman.

On April 8, 2008, the band opened for American nintendocore band HORSE the band on their first Israeli show, in Haifa. The band was also set to open for Sick of It All on June 18, 2008, as part of their Israeli tour, though this tour was eventually cancelled due to poor ticket sales.

=== A Postcard from Hell (2008–2010) ===
On October 4, 2008, the band participated in the show celebrating the release of the first Israeli punk rock compilation by the label High Fiber, which included a previously unreleased song by the band, entitled "Take Me". The release of the compilation took place at the Barby club in Tel Aviv. Around that time, the band was getting ready to record their second studio album, that they have started writing back in 2007.

The band started recording their second studio album, with Useless ID frontman Yotam Ben-Horin as producer. In January 2009, the band was signed by Japanese label Radtone Music, who set a release date for their second album A Postcard from Hell, in May 2009, though only in Japan. Before the release of the album, throughout February–March 2009, the band went on their first tour of the UK, when they decided to relocate to a London apartment for the time being, playing shows all around the London area, and promoting the band.

A little bit after the release of the album, another major line-up change has been made, and Nadav Rotem has joined as the band's bassist, letting Reiner to focus solely on vocals, though the band then decided to add another guitar, with Reiner switching to rhythm guitar instead of bass. The Israeli release show for A Postcard from Hell took place on September 10, 2009, at the OzenBar. The band then played as an opening act for The Fading on a show that took place at the Sublime club on October 12, 2009, that saw for the first time as a four-piece, since 2006. On January 1, 2010, the band supported Man Alive on their 10-year anniversary show at the Barzilay club in Tel Aviv. Following that show, guitarist Gal Pearlman was replaced by Or Yaakov on the lead guitar position.

The band continued to perform all around Israel throughout 2010, playing at the Showdown Festival on May 19, 2010, and opening for Frank Turner in Tel Aviv (June 4, 2010) and Haifa (June 6, 2010).

=== Lady Karma and signing to Broken English Records (2011–present) ===
In February 2011, bassist Nadav Rotem has decided to leave the band to focus on his other band Kids Insane and was replaced by Man Alive bassist Jonathan Shkedi. With Shkedi, the band flew to New York City in April 2011, to record their third studio album Lady Karma with producer John Naclerio, at Nada Recording Studio, where such bands as Polar Bear Club and The Audition have recorded. Recording took place between April 5–24, 2011.

On October 30, 2011, the first song from the third album, "Apocalypse 101", was released for free streaming through SoundCloud. On November 11, 2011, the first official single from the album, "Monsters In My Bed", was released along with a music video.

The album release show for Lady Karma took place on December 3, 2011, at the OzenBar in Tel Aviv.

In February 2012, the band was signed by US label Broken English Records (Just Surrender, Asteria), making their third album Lady Karma available for the first time in the US, Canada and South America. The album was released on February 9, 2012, being the band's first album officially released outside of Israel and Japan.

On March 6, 2012, it was announced that the band was signed by European label Fond of Life Records (This Is a Standoff, Failsafe) to release Lady Karma in Europe.

On March 7, 2012, it was announced that drummer Gideon Berger will be joining Useless ID as their new drummer, following Jonathan Harpak's departure, though he will remain in both bands.

On May 10, 2012, the band announced they will be shooting a music video for the second single off Lady Karma, "Apocalypse 101", over the weekend. The music video premiered on BlankTV on June 18, 2012.

On December 29, 2012, the band played their final show for 2012, and last one with lead guitarist Or Yaakov, before his move to the United States, at the Wunderbar in Haifa, along with Kids Insane and Magnolia.

On October 25, 2013, the band played their first show in almost a year, and their first with guitarist Roman Mishko of Chains of Past Decisions, who replaced Or Yaakov who was still out of the country. This followed the band going to a Japanese tour on November 1–4, 2013, supporting Useless ID.

On March 7, 2023, after 8 years of inactivity, the band announced a one-off reunion show at the Tmuna Theater in Tel Aviv, Israel, along with Man Alive who also just came back last year from a period of 6 years of inactivity, playing sporadic shows.

== Band members ==
- Eyal Reiner - lead vocals (2005–present), rhythm guitar (2009–present), bass (2005–2009)
- Or Yaakov - lead guitar, backing vocals (2010–present)
- Jonathan Shkedi - bass (2011–present)
- Gideon Berger - drums, percussion (2005–present)

Former members

- Nadav Rotem - bass (2009–2011)
- Gal Pearlman - guitar (2009–2010)
- Lavy Josephson - guitar, backing vocals (2005–2009)
- Yuval Segal - guitar (2005)

== Discography ==
Studio albums

- Roadkill (2006)
- A Postcard from Hell (2009)
- Lady Karma (2011)

EPs

- Short Notice (2006)
