= The Devil Went Down to the Holy Land =

Studio album by Betzefer
- Released: 25 November 2013
- Recorded: August–September 2012
- Genre: Groove metal, metalcore
- Length: 43:19
- Label: SPV/Steamhammer Records
- Producer: Tue Madsen

Betzefer chronology
Freedom to the Slave Makers (2011)	The Devil Went Down to the Holy Land (2013)	Entertain Your Force of Habit (2018)

The Devil Went Down to the Holy Land is Israeli groove metal band Betzefer's third full-length studio album, released in 25 November 2013. To fund the album's mixing and mastering, the band started a campaign on the Indiegogo website to raise money from donations by fans. During the campaign, the album was originally titled Suicide Hotline.

The album was mixed and mastered by Tue Madsen, who also mixed and mastered the band's first album Down Low, on 2–9 September 2012.

On 11 September 2012, the band revealed the album's track list, being made up from 14 tracks, the longest Betzefer album to date.

The band began working on several music videos for several songs off the album: a lyrics video for "I Hate" in October 2012, a stop motion animated video for "The Devil Went Down to the Holy Land" in December 2012, a live music video for "Can You Hear Me Now" in January 2013, as well as another live music video for "Sledgehammer" in April 2013.

On 8 November 2013, the band released the first single off the album: "The Devil Went Down to the Holy Land". It was released with a stop motion animated video directed by Ricardo Werdesheim. This video has over 10 million views on YouTube as of October 2021. A music video for the second single, "Sledgehammer", was released on 29 November 2013.

== Track listing ==
No.	Title	Length
1.	"Tropical" (intro)	0:51
2.	"The Devil Went Down to the Holy Land"	3:02
3.	"Killing The Fuss"	3:39
4.	"Cash"	2:59
5.	"Yuppie Six Feet Underground"	3:17
6.	"Cop Killer"	3:03
7.	"Sledgehammer"	3:30
8.	"The Medic"	3:44
9.	"Milk"	4:12
10.	"Suicide Hotline Pt. 1"	3:40
11.	"Suicide Hotline Pt. 2"	4:26
12.	"Cannibal"	2:46
13.	"I Hate"	2:42
14.	"Can You Hear Me Now"	4:08

LP edition bonus track
No.	Title	Length
15.	"Helter Skelter" (The Beatles cover)

== Personnel ==
- Avital Tamir – vocals
- Matan Cohen – guitars
- Rotem Inbar – bass
- Roey Berman – drums, percussion
