= We Don't Want the Airwaves =

EP by Useless ID
- Released: May 6, 2016
- Recorded: December 3–19, 2015
- Studio: Blasting Room (Fort Collins, Colorado)
- Genre: Punk rock
- Length: 9:31
- Label: Fat Wreck (Worldwide); EarSay (Israel)
- Producer: Bill Stevenson, Jason Livermore

Useless ID chronology
Symptoms (2012)	We Don't Want the Airwaves (2016)	State Is Burning (2016)

Singles from We Don't Want the Airwaves
- 1. "We Don't Want the Airwaves" Released: April 15, 2016

We Don't Want the Airwaves is a 7-inch EP by Israeli punk band Useless ID. It was released on May 6, 2016, and is the band's second release on Fat Wreck Chords.

The EP was recorded between December 3–9, 2015, at the Blasting Room in Fort Collins, Colorado, during the sessions for the band's eighth studio album State Is Burning, and features that album's first single "We Don't Want the Airwaves", as well as an album b-side that didn't make the cut for the album ("Tension"), and two acoustic outtakes, one of which is for the album's title track "State Is Burning".

On April 15, 2016, the 15-year anniversary to Joey Ramone's death, "We Don't Want the Airwaves" was released as the first official single from State Is Burning through the Fat Wreck Chords YouTube channel. On April 20, 2016, the band announced on their Facebook page they'll be making a music video for the single, which will be composed of fan footage that will be sent to them by fans, giving tribute to the Ramones, as the song is the band's tribute to the Ramones.

The EP's title track is the band's tribute to one of their favorite and most influential bands, the Ramones. The single's name is a play on the Ramones song "We Want the Airwaves", and its lyrics referencing many Ramones albums such as Leave Home, Road to Ruin, End of the Century, Pleasant Dreams and others, as well as referencing the band's friend Brandon Carlisle of Teenage Bottlerocket, who died on November 3, 2015. The song also features Brandon’s brother, Ray, performing vocals for the final verse.

"Tension" was originally a Yotam Ben Horin solo song that he has been performing live acoustically, as well as with his solo band since 2012. The band started performing the song together during rehearsals in 2015 and decided to record the song for their eighth studio album State Is Burning. Following the album's eventual focus on heavier, faster and shorter songs, the song didn't make the cut, and was released on the 7-inch EP that preceded the album instead.

== Track listing ==
No.	Title	Length
1.	"We Don't Want the Airwaves"	2:28
2.	"Right Wing Fascist Killing Spree"	1:34
3.	"Tension"	3:21
4.	"State Is Burning" (Acoustic)	2:07

== Personnel ==
- Yotam Ben Horin - lead vocals, bass
- Ishay Berger - lead guitar, backing vocals
- Guy Carmel - rhythm guitar, vocals
- Gideon Berger - drums, percussion

Production

- Bill Stevenson - production, engineering, arrangement
- Jason Livermore - production, engineering, mastering
