= Making Love (disambiguation) =

Making Love is a 1982 American drama film.

Making Love may also refer to:

- "Making Love" (song), the theme song to the 1982 film, performed by Roberta Flack
- Making Love ... The Very Best of Air Supply, a 1983 album by Air Supply
- Making Love (album), a 1999 album by Atom and His Package
- Making Love – A Conspiracy of the Heart, a 2003 comic novel
- A euphemism for sexual intercourse
- "Makin' Love", a song by Kiss from Rock and Roll Over
- "Making Love", a song by Hikaru Utada from Ultra Blue
- "Making Love", a song by Yngwie Malmsteen from Eclipse

== See also ==
- "Making Love Out of Nothing at All", a song by Air Supply, also covered by Bonnie Tyler
- Make Love (disambiguation)
- Sex (disambiguation)
