= Eighth Day Slice/Fiddlin on Ya Roof =

Eighth Day Slice/ Fiddlin on Ya Roof

Studio album by Yidcore
- Released: 13 June 2005
- Recorded: 2002–2005; HotHouse studios St Kilda, Australia
- Genre: Punk rock
- Length: 71:31; 36:56 (CD1); 34:35 (CD2)
- Labels: Rubber Records in conjunction with Boomtown Records. Additional distribution by Shock Records

Yidcore chronology
Attack of the B-Killers (2004)	Eighth Day Slice/ Fiddlin on Ya Roof (2005)

Eighth Day Slice and Fiddlin on Ya Roof are the second album and first album of original songs by the Australian punk rock band Yidcore, released on 13 June 2005 (see 2005 in music). Eighth Day Slice is an album containing Yidcore's first original, composed songs as well as several covers. It includes a cover of Bette Midler's "Wind Beneath My Wings" and the track "Since I Bothered You" which both received play on Triple J as well as its counterpart music video show Rage.

Fiddlin on Ya Roof is a reworking of the musical Fiddler on the Roof. It features guest vocals from Ben Lee, Useless ID, Renée Geyer, Ella Hooper, Handsome Dick Manitoba, The Drugs and Adam Goren (of Atom And His Package).

Some of these tracks have previously been released: "Why Won't Adam Sandler Let Us Do His Song?" previously appeared on the Chicken Soup Caper and Adam Slander EPs and tracks 3, 7, 15 and 16 previously appeared on the compilation Scrambles: New, Rare, Live and Classic Shtick released on Yidcore's first tour of Israel in 2003.

Despite being a double album, the whole package could easily fit on one CD.

Professional ratings
Review scores
Source	Rating
Beat Magazine	(Album of the week) mirror link
Bombshellzine.com	(Favourable) link
The Mercury	link

== Track listing ==
=== Eighth Day Slice ===
1. "Pickle Me Screamo"
2. "Lakchu Li Et Hachofesh" (Alon Chason cover)
3. "Why Won't Adam Sandler Let Us Do His Song?"
4. "Wind Beneath My Wings" (cover of Bette Midler)
5. "You! Toilet Wall! Me! Marriage!"
6. "Motherstrutter"
7. "I Wanna Get To Know You in the Biblical Sense"
8. "New Rock Is Just Like Old Rock Except Kinda Newer Sort Of"
9. "Thank The Lord For Hipster Jeans"
10. "Lu Yehi" (Chava Alberstein cover, written by Naomi Shemer)
11. "I Will Be So Brief I Have Already Finished"
12. "Aware of the Time"
13. "Anthem for a Slothocracy"
14. "Yoya" (Poogy cover)
15. "Especially For You"
16. "I Wish I Was More Like Woody Allen Cos My Daughter's A Bit of Alright"
17. "Since I Bothered You"

=== Fiddlin on ya Roof ===
1. "Entre Act"
2. "Tradition"
3. "Matchmaker Matchmaker (An Ode To Natalie Portman)"
4. "If I Were A Rich Man"
5. "Sabbath Prayer"
6. "To Life"
7. "Miracle of Miracles"
8. "Tevye's Dream"
9. "Intermission"
10. "Sunrise Sunset"
11. "Now I Have Everything"
12. "Do You Love Me?"
13. "The Rumour"
14. "Far From The Home I Love"
15. "Chava Ballet Sequence (Little Bird)"
16. "Anatevka"
