= California Sounds =

Studio album by Yotam
- Released: October 30, 2015
- Recorded: May 5–6, 2015
- Studio: Flying Blanket Studios, Phoenix, AZ
- Genre: Alternative rock, folk punk, acoustic
- Length: 28:33
- Label: Hardline Entertainment
- Producer: Yotam Ben Horin

Yotam chronology
Distant Lover (2012)	California Sounds (2015)

California Sounds is the second solo album by Israeli singer-songwriter Yotam Ben Horin, best known as frontman of Israeli punk rock band Useless ID. The album was released on October 30, 2015, through Hardline Entertainment, under the name Yotam.

Recording and mixing of the album took place on May 5–6, 2015, during two days while Yotam was solo touring the United States, in between tours, at the Flying Blanket Studios in Phoenix, Arizona. The album was recorded and mixed by Bob Hoag of The Ataris fame and produced by Yotam himself, using only analog gear. Mastering was later done by Jason Livermore of the Blasting Room.

Unlike his previous solo album that was recorded with a full band and featured an indie/alternative rock sound, California Sounds features Yotam as the sole musician on the record, featuring only his vocals and acoustic guitar, in a raw soul-driven acoustic sound. The only other musician except Yotam featured on the album is Bob Hoag, who guested on keyboards on the song "Silver and Gold".

The song "Tony Sly" was written about Yotam's close friend and No Use for a Name vocalist and guitarist Tony Sly, who died in his sleep on July 31, 2012, and is dedicated to Sly every time the song is played live.

== Musical style and lyrics ==
Music wise, the album is different from both the punk rock sound Yotam is known for in his band Useless ID and from the indie/alternative rock sound of his previous solo album Distant Lover, featuring folk-driven solely acoustic arrangements, influenced by other punk solo artists, such as Tony Sly, Joey Cape, Frank Turner and Mike Park, and other singer-songwriters such as Elliott Smith and Blake Schwarzenbach, while Yotam calling the album being "punk in spirit", more so than his previous solo effort.

Lyric wise, the album was written during Yotam's time touring as a solo artist throughout the United States, and deals with life on the road and everyday issues, such as coping with the loss of loved ones ("Tony Sly", "Grandfather"), breaking up ("Silver and Gold"), bad relationships ("Catastrophe"), unrequired love ("Platonic"), growing older without losing the drive of youth ("Young Man Bones"), juxtaposing pictures of adult life with the excitement of younger days ("Days of Living"), and clinging to home and loved ones despite a life on the road ("California Sounds").

== Track listing ==
All tracks are written by Yotam Ben Horin

No.	Title	Length
1.	"Days of Living"	2:44
2.	"Where Is the Time"	2:19
3.	"California Sounds"	2:47
4.	"Heaven Sent"	1:34
5.	"Silver and Gold"	2:09
6.	"Platonic"	2:44
7.	"Catastrophe"	2:35
8.	"Tony Sly"	2:36
9.	"Grandfather"	2:39
10.	"Young Man Bones"	3:10
11.	"Crawling" (Bonus Track)	3:09

== Personnel ==
- Yotam Ben Horin – lead vocals, acoustic guitar, production
- Bob Hoag – keyboards on "Silver and Gold"

Production

- Bob Hoag – recording, mixing
- Jason Livermore – mastering

== Release history ==
Region	Date
United States	October 30, 2015
