= Symptoms (Useless ID album) =

Studio album by Useless ID
- Released: February 14, 2012
- Recorded: February 3–17, 2011, at the Blasting Room, Fort Collins, Colorado
- Genre: Punk rock, alternative rock, melodic hardcore
- Length: 35:59
- Label: Fat Wreck (Worldwide); Bullion (Japan); EarSay (Israel)
- Producer: Bill Stevenson, Jason Livermore

Useless ID chronology
The Lost Broken Bones (2008)	Symptoms (2012)	We Don't Want the Airwaves (2016)

Singles from Symptoms
- 1. "Before It Kills" Released: January 10, 2012; 2. "New Misery" Released: October 12, 2012; 3. "Symptoms" Released: June 17, 2012

Symptoms is the seventh full-length studio album by Israeli punk band Useless ID. It was released on February 14, 2012, and is the band's first album on Fat Wreck Chords. It was released almost 4 years after the band's previous album, The Lost Broken Bones, marking the longest gap between two Useless ID albums, although the band released a collaboration album with rapper Muki in 2010.

It is the third album the band recorded at the Blasting Room in Fort Collins, Colorado, with producers Bill Stevenson and Jason Livermore, and the band's last album with drummer Jonathan Harpak, who left the band shortly after the release.

On January 10, 2012, the song "Before It Kills" was released as the first official single, through the Fat Wreck Chords website. On February 6, 2012, the song "Fear in the Mirror" was streamed for free on the Ground Control music blog. On February 7, 2012, the song "New Misery" was streamed for free on the Alternative Press official website. The song features guest vocals from Punchline's Steve Soboslai. The album's release show took place on March 8, 2012, at the Sublime club in Tel Aviv, supported by Jerusalem based punk rock band Man Alive.

== Singles ==
On January 10, 2012, the song "Before It Kills" was released as the first official single, through the Fat Wreck Chords website. On January 30, 2012, the band announced on its Facebook page that they'll be shooting a video for the song the same day at the Lightwave skate shop in Tel Aviv, inviting fans to participate in the video shooting. The video premiered on February 21, 2012, on the Alternative Press website.

On February 21, 2012, the band released the power ballad "Somewhere" as a promotional radio single, being released as the second single off the album.

On October 12, 2012, the band released "New Misery" as the second official single off the album, along with a music video which premiered exclusively on Alternative Press.

On June 17, 2013, the band released "Symptoms" as their third single off the album. An animated music video by young Israeli animation artist Yotam Goren was released for the single.

== Track listing ==
All lyrics are written by Yotam Ben-Horin, except "Live or Die" by Yotam Ben-Horin, Ishay Berger and Jonathan Shkedi; all music is composed by Yotam Ben-Horin.

No.	Title	Length
1.	"Live or Die"	3:15
2.	"Before It Kills"	1:59
3.	"Normal with You"	2:52
4.	"Erratic"	2:55
5.	"Manic Depression"	3:17
6.	"Sleeping with Knives"	3:20
7.	"Symptoms"	3:09
8.	"Obsessive Compulsive Disorder"	2:33
9.	"New Misery"	3:01
10.	"Waiting for an Accident"	2:51
11.	"Fear in the Mirror"	3:12
12.	"Somewhere"	3:36

"Somewhere" single cover

== Personnel ==
- Yotam Ben-Horin - lead vocals, bass
- Ishay Berger - lead guitar, backing vocals
- Guy Carmel - rhythm guitar, backing vocals
- Jonathan Harpak - drums, percussion, backing vocals

Additional musicians

- Steve Soboslai - additional vocals on "New Misery"
- Bill Stevenson - additional vocals on "Symptoms"
- Jonathan Shkedi - co-writing on "Live or Die"

Production

- Bill Stevenson - production, engineering, arrangement
- Jason Livermore - production, engineering, mastering
- Andrew Berlin - additional engineering
- Adi Khavous - photography
- Nir Guitraiman - art direction and design
