= Down Low =

Down Low may refer to:

- Down Low (album), an album by Betzefer
- Down Low (rap group), a rap group formed in Kaiserslautern, Germany
- "Down Low", a song by Doja Cat from the album Amala (2018)
- Down-low (sexual slang), African-American subculture

== See also ==
- The Down Low, an episode of the TV series House
- "Down Low (Nobody Has to Know)", a 1996 R&B song by R. Kelly
