= Distant Lover (album) =

Studio album by Yotam Ben Horin
- Released: October 3, 2012
- Recorded: April–September 2009, October–December 2010 at Zaza Studios, Tel Aviv, Israel
- Genre: Alternative rock, indie rock
- Length: 32:53
- Label: Hardline Entertainment, Music972, SBAM Records (Vinyl)
- Producer: Yotam Ben Horin

Yotam Ben Horin chronology
Distant Lover (2012)	California Sounds (2015)

Singles from Distant Lover
- 1. "Prohibited Area" Released: October 31, 2012; 2. "She Was a Saint" Released: December 3, 2012; 3. "Distant Lover" Released: January 2, 2013; 4. "In My Head" Released: March 3, 2013

Distant Lover is the debut solo album by Israeli singer-songwriter Yotam Ben Horin, best known as frontman of Israeli punk rock band Useless ID. The album was released on October 3, 2012, through Hardline Entertainment.

Recording of the album took place between April–September 2009, with mixing taking place in February–March 2010 by A.J. Mogis of Criteria, and mastering in May–June 2010 by Doug Van Sloun of Focus Mastering, though in October 2010, Ben Horin returned to the studio to re-record some songs, which delayed the release of the album. On January 10, 2011, Ben Horin announced on his Facebook page that the final master of the album was ready, though it was delayed because of his prior commitments and lack of label until 2012.

On August 21, 2012, it was announced that Ben Horin has signed with Hardline Entertainment and also the song "Into the Blues" was released as a promotional single, for free streaming on Hardline Entertainment's SoundCloud page.

It was announced that the album will be released in Israel on February 2, 2013, through the label Music972 under Hatav Hashmini distribution. The release was accompanied by a special release show at the OzenBar in Tel Aviv, with guest musicians Danny Sanderson, Amit Erez and Rotem Or.

== Musical style ==
Unlike the pop punk and punk rock sound Ben Horin is better known for in Useless ID, his solo album shows a more diverse sound with such varied genres as alternative rock, indie and folk rock, with influences such as Elliott Smith, Brian Wilson and Death Cab for Cutie. The album was recorded with garage rock drummer Ran Shimoni (ex-Monotonix) on drums and percussion, Saul Eshet (ex-keyboardist for Shy Nobleman's solo act) on piano and keyboards, and indie musician Katie Danielson who has toured with Yotam as a backing vocalist on his shows across Israel, on female backing vocals, with Yotam handling all guitar and bass duties himself. A.J. Mogis of Criteria and Bright Eyes, who also mixed the album, has provided keyboards on the song "Prohibited Area".

== Singles ==
On October 31, 2012, the acoustic ballad "Prohibited Area" was released as the first official single from the album. The song is solely acoustic with Ben Horin singing and playing acoustic guitar, backed by A.J. Mogis of Criteria on keyboards.

On December 3, 2012, Ben Horin released the second single off the album, "She Was a Saint", to great praise.

On January 2, 2013, the title track and third single, "Distant Lover", was released. A music video was also produced for the single, which was released previously on October 12, 2012, produced and directed by Raz Daskal.

On March 4, 2013, Ben Horin released "In My Head" as the fourth single off the album, along with a music video of him performing the song alone with an acoustic guitar.

== Track listing ==
All tracks are written by Yotam Ben Horin

No.	Title	Length
1.	"Just Like You"	3:08
2.	"Sad"	3:33
3.	"Distant Lover"	3:00
4.	"Prohibited Area"	3:19
5.	"Pitch Black"	3:23
6.	"Into the Blues"	3:20
7.	"She Was a Saint"	2:56
8.	"In My Head"	3:09
9.	"December"	3:00
10.	"Are We Dreams"	4:05

== Personnel ==
- Yotam Ben Horin – lead vocals, guitar, bass
- Katie Danielson – vocals
- Saul Eshet – piano, keyboards
- Ran Shimoni – drums, percussion
- A.J. Mogis – keyboards on "Prohibited Area"

Production

- A.J. Mogis – mixing
- Doug Van Sloun – mastering
- Liron Schaffer – recording, engineering
- Adi Khavous – photography
- Sergie – cover design

== Release history ==
Region	Date
United States	October 3, 2012
Israel	February 2, 2013
Europe	July 21, 2018 (Vinyl)
