= Make Love =

Make Love may refer to:

- "Make Love" (Keri Hilson song), a 2009 song by Keri Hilson
- "Make Love" (Faith Evans song), a 2015 song by Faith Evans featuring Keke Wyatt
- "Make Love" (Gucci Mane song), a 2017 song by Gucci Mane and Nicki Minaj
- "Make Love", a 2005 song by Daft Punk on the album Human After All
- "Make Love", a 2015 song by Chris Brown on the album Royalty

== See also ==
- Making Love (disambiguation)
- "Make Luv", a song by Room 5
