= Matan Cohen =

Israeli guitarist

Matan Cohen מתן כהן
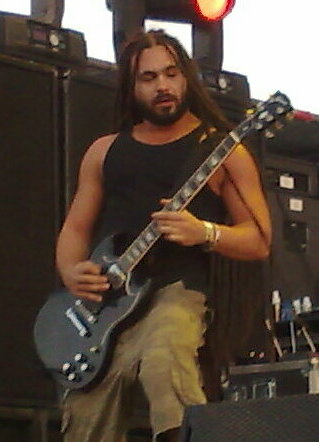
- Cohen with Betzefer at Ozzfest Tel Aviv 2010

Background information
- Also known as: Tim Young
- Born: 8 February 1982 (age 43)
- Origin: Israel
- Genres: Groove metal, metalcore, thrash metal, melodic death metal
- Occupation: Guitarist
- Years active: 1998–present
- Member of: Betzefer, Nail Within

Matan Cohen (Hebrew: מתן כהן; born 8 February 1982) is an Israeli guitarist best known for his work with groove metal band Betzefer and the recently reunited melodic death metal band Nail Within. He is also a frequent collaborator of comedy punk rock act Bo La'Bar featuring his Nail Within co-members Evil Haim, and Useless ID members Ishay Berger and Jonathan Harpak.

== Career ==
=== Betzefer (1998–present) ===
Matan Cohen formed Betzefer along with vocalist Avital Tamir and drummer Roey Berman as a one-off band for a high school gig in 1998.
What started as a high school gig became a big part of the lives of the band members and since then the band started working, first as a cover band (Metallica, etc.) and later they started recording their own material, releasing Pitz Aachbar in 2000, Some Tits, But No Bush in 2001 and New Hate in 2003.
In 2005, the band released its first full-length album Down Low and currently is working on its second.
Matan (who is also known as Tim Young outside Israel) appeared on all of the band's releases and is a part of the band from its formation until today. He is also noted for always using a custom black Gibson SG guitar.

=== Nail Within (2001–2003, 2007) ===
In 2001, Matan joined former Azazel and Betrayer members to form a new melodic death metal project by the name of Nail Within. Cohen served as a second guitarist in the band and while on hiatus from Betzefer, he left to Germany to record the band's first self-titled album.
He was a member of the band through all of its short-lived first incarnation and even suggested Betzefer vocalist Avital Tamir as vocalist after vocalist Yishay Swearts left. Tamir performed with the band for one show.
Recently rejoined the band as all of its members reunited in November 2007 for a one-off reunion show along with plans to record a new album in the future. Cohen will work with the band on its next album when he will finish prior commitments with Betzefer.

== Discography ==
=== Betzefer ===
- Pitz Aachbar (2000)
- Some Tits, But No Bush (2001)
- New Hate (2003)
- Down Low (2005)
- Freedom to The Slave Makers (2011)

=== Nail Within ===
- Nail Within (2003)
