= Freedom to the Slave Makers =

2011 studio album by Betzefer

Studio album by Betzefer
- Released: 18 February 2011 (release history)
- Recorded: March–May 2008
- Genre: Groove metal
- Length: 39:29
- Label: AFM, E1, Fontana North
- Producer: Warren Riker

Betzefer chronology
Down Low (2005)	Freedom to the Slave Makers (2011)	The Devil Went Down to the Holy Land (2013)

Singles from Freedom to the Slave Makers
- 1. "Nothing But Opinions" Released: 20 January 2011

Professional ratings
Review scores
Source	Rating
AllMusic	3/5 stars

Freedom to the Slave Makers is Israeli groove metal band Betzefer's second full-length studio album. It was released on 18 February 2011, after it was delayed a few times between 2008 and 2010. The album is a follow-up to the band's major label debut Down Low from 2005, though it was released on AFM Records.

== Background ==
It was confirmed on the band's Myspace, early before the recording, that the album would be produced by Down producer Warren Riker and that it would include 10 tracks.

The album was delayed several times from a July 2008 release date to September 2008, and then to an unspecified date in 2009, after which it was announced it will be delayed again until 2010. On 3 November 2010, it was finally announced that the band has signed a new record deal with AFM Records, who will release the release worldwide in February 2011. On 5 January 2011, it was confirmed that the album would be released worldwide on 18 February 2011, with a special release show in Tel Aviv to follow on 3 March 2011. On 6 January 2011, the band revealed the album's artwork and track list. On 10 January 2011, it was announced that the album would be released in the US on 22 February 2011 through E1 Music.

The album was mastered between 18 and 25 May 2009 at West West Side Music Studios in New Windsor, New York by Alan Douches, who previously worked with such bands as Through the Eyes of the Dead, Beneath the Massacre and A Life Once Lost.

On 20 January 2011, the first single from the album, "Nothing But Opinions", was released for free listening through such Israeli sites as Walla!, Nana 10 and Musicspot.

On 16 February 2011, the album was uploaded for free streaming on the band's Facebook and Myspace pages.

== Track listing ==
No.	Title	Length
1.	"Best Seller"	2:58
2.	"Backstage Blues"	5:08
3.	"Feels So Right"	3:39
4.	"Diamond Director"	3:55
5.	"Nothing But Opinions"	4:22
6.	"Doomsday"	4:12
7.	"Empty Magazine"	3:49
8.	"Perfect Lie"	5:10
9.	"Song for the Alcoholic"	3:14
10.	"Heavensent"	2:58

== Personnel ==
- Avital Tamir – vocals
- Matan Cohen – guitars
- Rotem Inbar – bass
- Roey Berman – drums, percussion

Production

- Warren Riker – production, mixing
- Alan Douches – mastering

== Release history ==
Region	Date
Europe	18 February 2011
Israel	18 February 2011
United States	22 February 2011
Canada	1 March 2011
