= Open Surgery =

Studio album by Man Alive
- Released: September 6, 2005
- Recorded: June 14–25, 2004
- Studio: Black Lodge Recording
- Genre: Punk rock
- Length: 36:13
- Label: The Militia Group
- Producer: Ed Rose

Man Alive chronology
Work in Progress (2002)	Open Surgery (2005)	Man Alive (2008)

Professional ratings
Review scores
Source	Rating
Punknews.org	3/5 stars
Melodic.net	3.5/5 stars

Open Surgery is the third full-length album by Israeli punk rock band Man Alive, released on September 6, 2005. It was the band's breakthrough album, released worldwide by the Militia Group label, and produced by longtime the Get Up Kids producer Ed Rose, recorded at his own studio Black Lodge Recording in Eudora, KS, in June 2004.

== Track listing ==
No.	Title	Length
1.	"Give Me a Sign"	3:17
2.	"Say What You Want"	3:44
3.	"Stationary"	3:08
4.	"Rewind"	2:46
5.	"Open Surgery"	3:14
6.	"Catch Phrases, Slogans and Chants"	2:42
7.	"The Victory Song"	2:40
8.	"On the Air"	3:16
9.	"Against the Wall"	0:45
10.	"Fire"	3:22
11.	"Hold On"	3:51
12.	"I.R.L."	3:28

== Personnel ==
- Jamie Hilsden – lead vocals, rhythm guitar
- David Shkedi – lead guitar, vocals
- Jon Shkedi – bass, vocals
- Matthew R C Smith – drums, percussion
