= Never Trust a Hippy =

EP by NOFX
- Released: March 14, 2006
- Studio: Motor Studios, San Francisco
- Genre: Punk rock
- Length: 13:05
- Label: Fat Wreck Chords
- Producer: Bill Stevenson, Jason Livermore, Fat Mike

NOFX chronology
| The Greatest Songs Ever Written (By Us) (2005) | Never Trust a Hippy (2006) | Wolves in Wolves' Clothing (2006) |

Never Trust a Hippy is an EP by the American punk rock band NOFX, released March 14, 2006 through Fat Wreck Chords. Released a month in advance of the band's tenth studio album, Wolves in Wolves' Clothing, the EP includes two tracks from the album and four others recorded during the album's recording sessions. The EP was made available for streaming on March 12 via Alternative Press.

== Background ==
In 2003, NOFX's Regaining Unconsciousness EP had served as a pre-release teaser for their ninth studio album The War on Errorism. Never Trust a Hippy served as a similar teaser for their next studio album, Wolves in Wolves' Clothing. All of the tracks on the EP were recorded during the album sessions at Motor Studios in San Francisco with the production team of Bill Stevenson and Jason Livermore from The Blasting Room, with NOFX bandleader Fat Mike also producing. Stevenson and Livermore served as recording and mixing engineers for the sessions that produced "Seeing Double at the Triple Rock", "The Marxist Brothers", "Golden Boys", and "Everything in Moderation (Especially Moderation)". Adam Krammer, who had worked with the band since 1997's So Long and Thanks for All the Shoes, served as recording engineer for the sessions that produced "You're Wrong" and "I'm Going to Hell for This One", which were then mixed by Livermore. Both the EP and the album were mastered by Livermore at The Blasting Room in Fort Collins, Colorado. Comic book artist Rick Remender created the cover artwork for the EP, while Brian Archer did the design and layout.

The tracks "Golden Boys", "You're Wrong", and "I'm Going to Hell for This One" are new recordings of songs that originally appeared in NOFX's 7" of the Month Club, a series of twelve 7-inch gramophone records released by the band between February 2005 and January 2006. "Golden Boys" is a cover version; the song was originally recorded in 1984 by Vagina Dentata, a post-Germs project of guitarist Pat Smear.

== Reception ==
Professional ratings
Review scores
| Source | Rating |
|---|---|
| Allmusic | 3.5/5 stars |
| IGN | 6.8/10 |
| Robert Christgau | (choice cut) |
| Rolling Stone | 3/5 stars |

Corey Apar of Allmusic rated the EP three and a half stars out of five, saying "Fat Mike and crew have packed six songs into 13 minutes of cutting observation and criticism. On 'The Marxist Brothers', the band uses a backdrop that recalls The Clash's "London Calling" to underline ironic remarks about contemporary anarchists. Religious overtones also dot the entire release, with a rebellious, drug-taking Jesus resurrected to beat up Mel Gibson and collect his royalty checks in 'I'm Going to Hell for This One', while the acoustic 'You're Wrong' lets all right-wing and religious folk know their interpretation of the Bible and attitudes toward other issues are, well, wrong." Christian Hoard of Rolling Stone gave it three stars out of five, saying "On this six-cut EP, these long-running punks strike a nice balance between leftist splatter and their bratty bread-and-butter, tossing in speed-metal mayhem like 'Everything in Moderation (Especially Moderation)' alongside embittered politico rants like 'You're Wrong'." Critic Robert Christgau simply gave the EP a "cut" rating, recommending only "You're Wrong".

== Track listing ==
All tracks are written by Fat Mike, except where noted

| No. | Title | Length |
|---|---|---|
| 1. | "Seeing Double at the Triple Rock" (from Wolves in Wolves' Clothing, 2006) | 2:09 |
| 2. | "The Marxist Brothers" (from Wolves in Wolves' Clothing, 2006) | 2:47 |
| 3. | "Golden Boys" (written by Pat Smear, Darby Crash, Tim Ferris, and Michelle Bell; originally performed by Vagina Dentata) | 2:47 |
| 4. | "You're Wrong" | 2:06 |
| 5. | "Everything in Moderation (Especially Moderation)" | 1:23 |
| 6. | "I'm Going to Hell for This One" | 1:53 |
| Total length: | | 13:05 |

== Personnel ==
Credits adapted from the EP's liner notes.

Band

- Fat Mike – lead vocals, bass guitar, producer
- El Hefe – guitar, backing vocals
- Eric Melvin – guitar, backing vocals
- Erik Sandin – drums

Production

- Bill Stevenson – recording engineer, mixing engineer (tracks 1–3 and 5); producer (all tracks)
- Jason Livermore – recording engineer (tracks 1–3 and 5); producer, mixing engineer, audio mastering (all tracks)
- Adam Krammer – recording engineer (tracks 4 and 6)

Artwork

- Rick Remender – artwork
- Brian Archer – layout and design
