= New Hate =

EP by Betzefer
- Released: May 2003
- Recorded: 2003 at Eyal Glotman's studio
- Genre: Groove metal
- Length: 21:49
- Label: TwoFatMan

Betzefer chronology
Some Tits, but No Bush (2001)	New Hate (2003)	Down Low (2005)

New Hate is the second EP by Israeli groove metal band Betzefer, released in 2003. It was mixed by ex-Eternal Gray guitarist Eyal Glotman and recorded in his studio, with mastering by Maor Appelbaum.

This was the band's last unsigned release, as their next release was already on the Roadrunner Records label.

== Track listing ==
No.	Title	Length
1.	"Right About"	3:36
2.	"Tin"	4:05
3.	"Peasants"	3:30
4.	"Rinse: Repeat"	3:02
5.	"New Hate"	2:11
6.	"Buddah"	5:24
Total length:		21:49

== Personnel ==
- Avital Tamir – vocals
- Matan Cohen – guitars
- Evil Haim – bass
- Roey Berman – drums, percussion
- Eyal Glotman – recording, mixing
- Maor Appelbaum – mastering
