= Hair: Debatable =

Live album by Atom And His Package
- Released: 2004
- Genre: Punk
- Length: 1:11:19
- Label: Hopeless Records

Atom And His Package chronology
Attention! Blah Blah Blah (2003)	Hair: Debatable (2004)

Professional ratings
Review scores
Source	Rating
Allmusic	link

Hair: Debatable is a live album by Atom and His Package. All the songs are written by Adam Goren unless otherwise indicated.

== Track listing ==
1. "Intro" – 1:58
2. "(Lord It's Hard to Be Happy When You're Not) Using the Metric System" – 3:20
3. "Pumping Iron For Enya" – 2:58
4. "Possession (Not the One by Danzig)" – 2:49
5. "Happy Birthday Ralph" – 2:22
6. "Bloody Lip" – 0:38 (I Hate You cover)
7. "Snowshoe BBQ" – 2:33
8. "Upside Down From Here" – 2:58
9. "Mustache T.V." – 2:10
10. "Shopping Spree Introduction" – 3:04
11. "Shopping Spree" – 4:12
12. "Mind's Playing Tricks on Me" – 2:44 (Geto Boys cover)
13. "If You Own the Washington Redskins, You're a Cock" – 2:09
14. "Waiting Room" – 2:05 (Fugazi cover)
15. "I'm Downright Amazed At What I Can Destroy With Just a Hammer" – 3:22
16. "Anarchy Means I Litter" – 3:33
17. "Undercover Funny" – 3:26
18. "Head (She's Just A...)" – 2:16
19. "What WE Do On Christmas" – 2:31
20. "Collateral Damage" – 0:57 (Brutal Truth cover)
21. "Me and My Black Metal Friends" – 2:36
22. "Does Anyone Else In This Room Want to Marry His Or Her Own Grandmother?" – 2:43
23. "Avenger" – 3:13
24. "Hats Off to Halford" – 2:18
25. "Meatball" – 1:59 (Downgirl cover)
26. "Atom and His Package" – 3:15
27. "Punk Rock Academy" – 3:12
