= Ratfaces Home Videos Presents Useless ID =

Video by Useless ID
- Released: September 23, 2006
- Genre: Punk rock, pop punk
- Label: EarSay

Ratfaces Home Videos Presents Useless ID is Useless ID's first DVD which was released on September 23, 2006, in a special release show in Tel Aviv, Israel.

The DVD includes a documentary about the band, footage from live performances, all of the band's music videos until 2006, photo stills, backstage footage, outtakes, and "behind the scenes" with the band.

The DVD was later included with the band's 2008 album The Lost Broken Bones, when pressed by Suburban Home Records.

== Music videos ==
There are seven music videos on the DVD:

- "Turn Up The Stereo" (2004) - 3:35
- "Pink Stars and Magazines" (2005) - 2:29
- "State of Fear" (2005) - 3:15
- "The Worst Holiday I've Ever Had" (2003) - 3:26
- "Bring Me Down" (2002) - 2:05
- "Too Late to Start Over" (2003) - 2:50
- "At Least I Tried" (2003) - 3:01

== Live performances ==
There are 12 live performance videos that were recorded during Useless ID's latest tour supporting the album Redemption. The performances were recorded in Japan, Germany, Switzerland and Israel.

- "At the Stadium" (live in Japan) - 1:36
- "It's Alright" (live in Japan) - 3:04
- "Unhappy Hour" (live in Japan) - 1:04
- "Too Late to Start Over" (live in Japan) - 2:58
- "Deny it" (live in Germany) - 3:47
- "Turn Up the Stereo" (live in Germany) - 3:20
- "Jukebox 86" (live in Switzerland) - 2:41
- "My Therapy" (live in Switzerland) - 2:55
- "Pink Stars and Magazines" (live in Switzerland) - 2:08
- "Presents" (live in Switzerland) - 1:50
- "Redemption" (live in Israel) - 3:36
- "At the Stadium Another Bad Taste" (Acoustic) (live in Israel) - 4:01

== Credits ==
- Production: EarSay Records, The Third Ear
- Executive Production: Yuval Dagan, Guy Carmel, Yotam Ben-Horin, Nir Gotriman, Doron Ben Tov, Jasmine Russo, Yair Yona
- Music Videos Production and Direction: Assaf Forman (Bring Me Down), Itay Sikolski (Too Late To Start Over), Sharon Israel (The Worst Holiday I've Ever Had, Turn Up The Stereo, Pink Stars and Magazines - w. Adam Weisser), Tamar Walla (At Least I Tried), Eran Rotem (State Of Fear)
