= Some Tits, but No Bush =

EP by Betzefer
- Released: 1 January 2001
- Genre: Groove metal, metalcore
- Length: 26:25
- Label: Self-released

Betzefer chronology
Some Tits, but No Bush (2001)	New Hate (2003)

Some Tits, but No Bush is the debut EP by Israeli groove metal band Betzefer. It was released in 2001.

== Track listing ==
No.	Title	Length
1.	"Shee"	1:13
2.	"Incompassity"	4:04
3.	"Say AHHHH"	3:00
4.	"Better Plan"	2:44
5.	"Things"	4:29
6.	"Much Better Plan" (including hidden track)	10:55
Total length:		26:25

== Personnel ==
- Avital Tamir – vocals
- Matan Cohen – guitars
- Menashe "Mashy" Hazan – bass
- Roey Berman – drums, percussion
