= Redefining Music =

Studio album by Atom and His Package
- Released: April 3, 2001
- Genre: Punk rock, synthpunk
- Length: 37:25
- Label: Hopeless

Atom and His Package chronology
Shopping Spree EP (2001)	Redefining Music (2001)	Hamburgers EP (2002)

Professional ratings
Review scores
Source	Rating
AllMusic	4/5 stars

Redefining Music is the fourth album by American synthpunk musician Atom and His Package. It was released on April 3, 2001 on Hopeless Records.

== Track listing ==
1. "Undercover Funny" - 2:09
2. "Trump" - 2:22
3. "Shopping Spree" - 3:12
4. "Seed Song" - 1:48
5. "Anarchy Means I Litter" - 2:40
6. "Mission 1: Avoid Job Working With Assholes" - 3:18
7. "For Franklin" - 3:06
8. "Going to Georgia" - 2:01
9. "Cross Country Atom and His Package Tour Via Bicycle" - 1:52
10. "Atari Track and Field / New Controller Conspiracy" - 2:55
11. "If You Own the Washington Redskins You're a Cock" - 1:47
12. "Before My Friends Do" - 2:41
13. "Alpha Desperation March" - 2:35
14. "Open Your Heart" - 2:34
15. "Upside Down From Here" - 2:26
- The songs "Seed Song", "Going to Georgia" and "Alpha Desperation March" are covers of songs by The Mountain Goats.
- The song "Open Your Heart" is a Madonna cover, with the addition of the word "fuckface."
