= Locas in Love =

- Origin: Köln, Germany
- Genres: Indie; Pop
- Years active: 2001 - present
- Labels: Sitzer, Virgin/EMI
- Members: Stefanie Schrank; Björn Sonnenberg; Jan Niklas Jansen
- Past members: Kurt Kreikenbom; Maurizio Arca
- Website: www.locasinlove.com

Locas In Love is a German indie rock band. It was formed in the fall of 2001 in Cologne by Björn Sonnenberg and Stefanie Schrank, Jan Niklas Jansen joined a few months later. They have been touring and releasing ever since, though mostly in Germany and bordering European countries. In 2006 they played shows in the US for the first time when they were mixing their second album 'Saurus' with Peter Katis in Bridgeport, CT.

The name 'Locas In Love' is taken from a comic by Los Bros Hernandez (as is the title of their first EP 'Río Veneno', Poison River).

They are one of Germany's best-known unknown bands. They are championed by other artists such as The National or Malcolm Middleton who plays guitar on 'Saurus' and his former band Arab Strap that took Locas In Love as a special guest on their last two tours in Germany.

Locas In Love is influenced by a wide variation of musical styles. They can be compared to bands like The Good Life, Herman Düne, Bright Eyes, Arcade Fire, The National, Pavement, Luna, The Velvet Underground, Silver Jews, Sonic Youth or German art rockers Blumfeld in their wide array of musical spectres held together by the distinct voices of Björn Sonnenberg and Stefanie Schrank. Their lyrics are mostly in German.

Some of the members of Locas In Love are also involved in the poppier project de:Karpatenhund that released its debut album on Virgin in 2007 which spawned some minor hit singles.

== Discography ==
=== Albums ===
- 2004: What Matters Is The Poem (Hobby DeLuxe)
- 2007: Saurus (Sitzer/Virgin/EMI)
- 2008: Winter (Sitzer/Engine Room)
- 2011: Lemming (Staatsakt.)
- 2012: NEIN! (Staatsakt.)
- 2015: Use Your Illusion 3 & 4 (Warner Music)
- 2015: Kalender (Staatsakt.)

=== Singles and EPs ===
- 2001: Río Veneno, CD-EP (Wald & Wiesen Tonträger)
- 2002: A Robot Can Make A Hole In The Ground, 10"-EP (Kontraphon)
- 2002: Música De La Concha, CD-EP (Hobby DeLuxe)
- 2003: El Loco Roco..., Split-7" with Katze (Krautpop)
- 2006: s/t, EP, a.k.a. Wir fangen von vorne an (Sitzer)

== See also ==
- Love and Rockets (comics) – A segment of this series is called Locas in Love, which is where they got their name from.
