= Avital Tamir =

Israeli metal vocalist

Avital Tamir אביטל תמיר
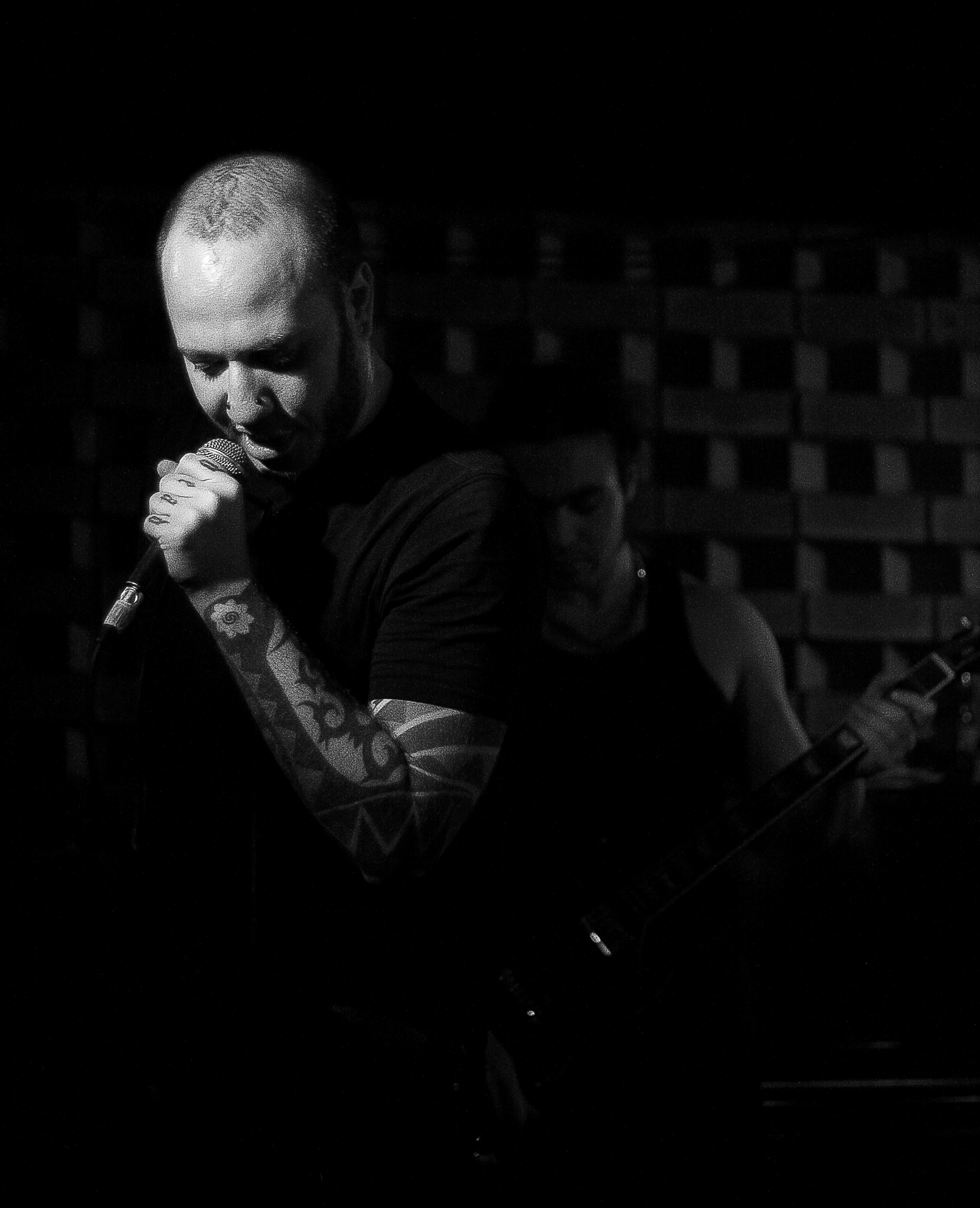
- Tamir performing with Betzefer in 2012

Background information
- Birth name: 9 December 1981 (age 43)
- Origin: Israel
- Genres: Groove metal, metalcore, experimental rock, indie rock, indie pop, alternative rock, acoustic, garage rock
- Occupation: Singer
- Years active: 1998–present
- Member of: On Shoulders of Giants
- Formerly of: Betzefer

Avital Tamir (Hebrew: אביטל תמיר) is an Israeli musician best known as the former lead singer for metal band Betzefer and for his experimental pop trio On Shoulders of Giants. He was also briefly a member of fellow Betzefer bandmate Matan Cohen's death metal band Nail Within.

== Career ==
=== Betzefer (1998–2016) ===
Avital Tamir formed Betzefer along with guitarist Matan Cohen and drummer Roey Berman as a one-off band for a high school gig in 1998.
What started as a high school gig became a big part of the lives of the band members and since then the band started working, first as a cover band and later they started recording their own material, releasing Pitz Aachbar in 2000 and the EP New Hate in 2003. In 2005, the band released its first full-length album Down Low. Tamir was the vocalist for the band since its formation and appeared on all of the band's releases, until his departure in 2016. He was replaced by Aharon Ragoza.

=== Nail Within (2003, 2007) ===
In 2003, after Nail Within vocalist Yishay Swearts left, guitarist Matan Cohen brought his Betzefer bandmates Avital Tamir (on vocals) and Rotem Inbar (on bass) to play with the band. After few rehearsals the idea fell through and the band disbanded. Although, before those events, Tamir did guest on some live shows of Nail Within.
In 2007, before reuniting the whole line-up, Cohen brought Tamir once again to rehearse with the band. Again, the collaboration wasn't long and soon the whole old line-up reunited.
It is being rumored that Avital Tamir, along with Betzefer bassist Rotem Inbar, will be involved in the new proposed album by Nail Within, though this wasn't confirmed, but it is known that Matan Cohen, Avital Tamir and Rotem Inbar, are all active in Nail Within.

=== On Shoulders of Giants (2006–present) ===
In 2006, Avital took time off from touring with Betzefer to start a new project dubbed On Shoulders of Giants together with 7% Mind Usage guitarist Idan Epshtein and Jerusalem based singer Katie Danielson. The three recorded their debut album titled Come Crashing, which was released independently on 17 September 2009. Avital handled most of the guitar duties on the record as well as the vocals, and the bass.

=== Black Swan (2010–present) ===
In early 2010, Tamir has started the alternative/garage rock band Black Swan with ex-Got No Shame lead guitarist Matan Ergas (AKA Nose). The band has played extensively in Israel through 2010 while Betzefer was on hiatus, playing both full band electric shows, as well as many stripped-down acoustic shows, even playing one whole show in two parts: opening with acoustic and main show as a full-band.

The band has recorded several demos which were upped to the band's Facebook page. The band planned to record the album sometime in 2011. Around that time, Tamir promoted Betzefer's second album Freedom to the Slave Makers released in February 2011.

== Discography ==
=== Betzefer ===
- Pitz Aachbar (2000)
- Some Tits, but No Bush (2001)
- New Hate (2003)
- Down Low (2005)
- Freedom to the Slave Makers (2011)
- The Devil Went Down to the Holy Land (2013)

=== On Shoulders of Giants ===
- Come Crashing (2009)
