= Yidcore =

Australian Jewish punk rock band

- Origin: Melbourne, Victoria, Australia
- Genres: Jewish rock; punk rock; comedy rock
- Years active: 1998–2009, 2011, 2019
- Label: Rubber Records
- Members: Bram Presser; Myki Slonim; Dave Jesudason; Rory Kelaart
- Website: www.yidcore.com

Yidcore (Note: /ˈjɪd.kɔːr/; Hebrew: יידקור) are an Australian Jewish punk rock band from Melbourne, formed in 1998. Known primarily for playing punk covers of Jewish and Israeli songs, the band started writing more of its own material in later albums.

== History ==
The band formed in the late 1990s at Mount Scopus Memorial College, with their first public performance coming in 1998 at an event organised by the Australasian Union of Jewish Students.

Yidcore's first self-titled album was released in 2000. In 2002, the band released the Great Chicken Soup Caper EP, which contained a song, "Why Won't Adam Sandler Let Us Do His Song?", in which Presser laments about Adam Sandler not giving him permission to cover The Chanukah Song. In November 2003 the band arrived in Israel for its first tour of the country, and released the live/rare tracks album Scrambles: New, Live, Rare and Classic Shtick to celebrate the tour. New, Live, Rare and Classic Shtick included a version of Skrewdriver's "White Power" titled "(Song Formerly Known As) White Power", with anti-racist lyrics.

In 2004, when Yidcore returned to Australia, they put out the Adam Slander EP, in which they cover the Chanukah Song as "The Punk Rock Chanukah Song". The following year, the band released a double album, titled Eighth Day Slice/Fiddlin on Ya Roof, via Rubber Records. The band again arrived in Israel for a second tour, and this time released the compilation Rocket to Rechovoth to celebrate the event, in reference to Ramones album Rocket to Russia, using the Israeli city of Rehovot.

The band's third and final album, titled They Tried to Kill Us. They Failed. Let's Eat! was released in 2007, again via Rubber Records. The 16-track album contained only 2 covers of Israeli songs, plus a cover of the World War II anti-fascist song "Zog nit keyn mol". In April 2008 Yidcore went on their third and final Israeli tour, and released a new EP, titled The Hummusexual E.P., given away for free with every band merchandise purchased at the tour.

=== Break-up and reunions ===
Yidcore decided to disband in 2009, with Presser quipping "how many circumcision and hummous jokes can you make before it gets sad?" The band played their farewell show on 17 December 2009 at the Esplanade Hotel in St Kilda, Melbourne.

In 2011, Yidcore reunited for a show at The Arthouse in Melbourne on 7 April. In 2013, Yidcore opened up a Blogspot website offering free downloads of all their albums except Scrambles: Live, Rare and Classic Shtick, on the grounds that Scrambles found it too poor sounding even in 320 kbit/s mp3.

In 2019, Yidcore announced a performance to take place on 8 September at the Melbourne Recital Centre. This was followed up by a show at the Last Chance Rock 'n Roll Bar on 26 September. These were the band's final shows.

== Logo ==
The band's logo is a variation of the Ramones logo (which in turn is based on the seal of the president of the United States), with the names of the band members in Hebrew. The eagle is replaced by a chicken with a menora above its head, the apple tree branch replaced by a shofar, the arrows replaced by the Magen David and the writing "Oy Vey, Let's Eat" instead of "Hey Ho, Let's Go". The logo can be seen on the album cover of Yidcore's compilation Rocket to Rechovoth.

The band's mascot is a rubber chicken called Scrambles, which was usually taped to lead singer Bram Presser's microphone on concerts. It is now part of the Jewish Museum of Australia's collection.

== Discography ==
=== Studio albums ===
- 2000 - Yidcore (album)|Yidcore (Swell Records/Big Daddy Distro)
- 2005 - Eighth Day Slice/Fiddlin on Ya Roof (Rubber Records)
- 2007 - They Tried to Kill Us. They Failed. Let's Eat! (Rubber Records/EMI)

=== EPs/Splits ===
- 2002 - The Great Chicken Soup Caper EP (Swell Records/Big Daddy Distro)
- 2003 - The Adam Slander E.P. (Little Big Music/MRA)
- 2004 - Attack of the B-Killers - split with Useless ID, Man Alive, Atom and His Package (Boomtown/MGM)
- 2008 - The Hummusexual EP (Speck Records)

=== Compilations ===
- 2003 - Scrambles: New, Live, Rare and Classic Shtick (released independently)
- 2005 - Rocket to Rechovoth (Speck Records)

=== DVDs ===
- 2005 - Wind Beneath my Wings (Rubber Records/Boomtown)
