= Yotam Ben Horin =

Israeli musician (born 1979)

Yotam Ben Horin יותם בן חורין
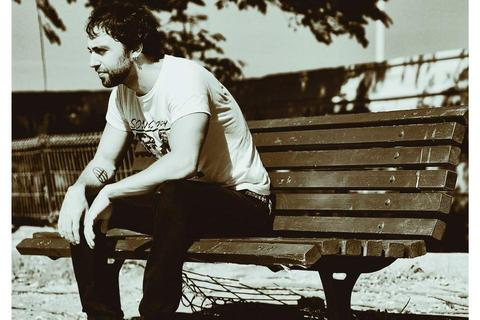

Background information
- Born: February 17, 1979 (age 47)
- Origin: Haifa, Israel
- Genres: Punk rock, pop punk, indie rock, alternative rock, downtempo, acoustic rock, grunge, power pop, hardcore
- Occupations: Musician, singer-songwriter, bassist
- Instruments: Vocals, bass, guitar, Moog synthesizer
- Years active: 1997–present
- Labels: Suburban Home, Kung Fu, Falafel, Hardline Entertainment
- Website: www.yotambenhorin.com

Yotam Ben Horin (Hebrew: יותם בן חורין; born February 17, 1979, in Haifa, Israel) is an Israeli musician best known for his work as the lead singer and bassist for Israeli punk rock band Useless ID, as well as a solo artist releasing music closer to the indie/alternative rock scene. Most recently, he is also known for his work as an additional guitarist and backing vocalist for Israeli classic rock band Kaveret on their 2013 reunion performances.

== Professional career ==
=== Useless ID (1997–present) ===
Yotam Ben Horin joined Useless ID as a bassist and backing vocalist, replacing former bassist Adi Alkavatz in 1997. He appeared on the band's first release and first full-length album, Dead's Not Punk which was released in September 1997, through the band's own independent label Falafel Records. He later appeared on the band's second full-length album Get in the Pita Bread Pit in 1999, which was also released through Falafel Records, and Let it Burn, the band's split album with The Ataris, which was released in April 2000 on Kung Fu Records and was the last to feature the band's rhythm guitarist Guy Carmel on lead vocals.

Following the band's split album with The Ataris, the band was offered a record contract in Kung Fu Records, which resulted in guitarist Guy Carmel leaving his position as lead vocalist in the band and staying a backing vocalist only. Ben Horin then took the position of the band's lead vocalist and main songwriter, as well as staying the bassist. He sang on all of the band's international major releases: Bad Story, Happy Ending (2001), No Vacation from the World (2003), Redemption (2005) and The Lost Broken Bones released in October 2008, through their new label – Suburban Home Records. On all of these albums, Ben Horin also wrote the majority of the material.

On January 27, 2011, Useless ID played their last show in support of The Lost Broken Bones at the Barby club in Tel Aviv, Israel, before taking off to record their new album at the Blasting Room in Fort Collins, Colorado. The band entered the Blasting Room on February 2, 2011, to begin recording the new album. Recording was finished on February 17, 2011, and mixing was done on February 22, with mastering taking place in April. Symptoms, the band's seventh full-length album and fifth with Yotam on vocals, was released on February 14, 2012.

=== Solo career (2008–present) ===
- Around April 2008, Ben-Horin started a solo MySpace page where he started uploading quiet and mellow acoustic songs he wrote, recorded and demoed by himself. In his page he also wrote he will upload more quiet demos he feels are inappropriate for Useless ID and that he demos by himself in his home, with an intention of recording a solo album of such acoustic, folk and indie songs in the future.
- In early 2009, Ben Horin announced he will start recording his solo album soon, and started promoting his solo songs with acoustic shows, with a singer-songwriter approach in small venues, especially bars and coffee shops, around Israel.
- He then updated on his Facebook page that he was entering Zaza Studios in late April 2009 to start recording his solo album, with an intention to release the album around September 2009, although it is unknown on which label it will be released, or if it will be released internationally.
- On May 4, 2009, Ben Horin revealed the track list for his album, as well as a progress update on the recording, commenting that the recording is almost done.
- On July 22, 2009, Ben Horin stated on his Myspace page that recording for the solo album will continue in September, followed by mixing and mastering of the album, and that he expects that the album to be released very late 2009, or early 2010.
- On February 8, 2010, mixing for the solo album began by A.J. Mogis of Criteria. Mixing was done on March 3, 2010, with Ben-Horin commenting that mastering will be done in April, and he expects the album to be released around mid/late 2010. On April 14, 2010, upon returning from Useless ID's U.S. tour, Ben Horin has confirmed that mastering will begin soon.
- On May 17, 2010, Ben-Horin has confirmed on his Facebook that mastering of his solo album has begun, and that it is being mastered by Doug Van Sloun of Focus Mastering. On June 10, 2010, Ben Horin has announced on his Facebook page that mastering is finished and that the album is now finally complete, but it will take some more time until it will be ready for release.
- On June 21, 2010, Ben Horin had his first solo show with a full band, as opposed to his solo acoustic shows he played up until now. His solo band consisted of him on lead vocals and guitar, Man Alive frontman Jamie Hilsden on guitar and vocals, Zoe Polanski on bass and Corey Swift on drums. Corey Swift has since been replaced with 7% Mind Usage drummer Guy Fleisher.
- On October 27, 2010, Yotam entered the studio once again to re-record some songs he wasn't happy with for his solo album. He has confirmed that the album is nearly finished. On December 21, 2010, Yotam had updated his Facebook page with the title "soon", implying on the completion and release of his album.
- On January 10, 2011, Yotam has announced that the final master of his album is finally done.
- On June 12, 2011, Yotam has uploaded a compilation of songs entitled Home Recordings to his Bandcamp and SoundCloud pages for free listening and purchase. On his Facebook page, Yotam has explained that he decided to compile this album of acoustic demos to have something out before his album will be finally released, and that all the songs on this compilation are songs that didn't make the album, being raw acoustic demos recorded by himself at his home. On his Facebook page, Yotam has commented that the album is scheduled for a November/December 2011 release.
- On October 8, 2011, Yotam has announced he is booking solo shows all over Israel for a long series of shows to promote his upcoming album. He has also announced that he'll be putting a new solo band together, for the upcoming series of shows. On October 19, 2011, Yotam has said on his Facebook page that the front cover for his album is ready and the back cover is almost ready, as well as mentioning he has put together a new solo band, which comprises himself on vocals and guitar, Or Edry on bass and Guy Fleisher, who has already played with Yotam before, on drums and percussion. Edry's first performance with Yotam took place on October 30 at the OzenBar where Yotam played an acoustic set with fellow singer-songwriter Rotem Or. The first full-band show of the new line-up took place on November 14. Later in November, Guy Fleisher was replaced with Aviv Cohen on drums and percussion.
- On August 21, 2012, it was announced that Yotam has signed to Hardline Entertainment to release his debut solo album, Distant Lover, on October 3, 2012. Hardline Entertainment released the first single from the album, "Into the Blues", for free streaming on SoundCloud, while Yotam has also expressed his interest in gong on a tour with his solo act. On February 2, 2013, the album was officially released in Israel, through the label Music 972, under the distribution of Hatav Hashmini.
- On March 6, 2013, Ben Horin has embarked on his first solo tour of the US, playing acoustic shows mainly in the east coast, including a performance at the SXSW Festival in Austin, Texas, alongside such artists as Green Day, Depeche Mode, Iggy Pop and more.
- In 2020, D-Composers released an album of traditional Hebrew hymns for shabbat under the name of "Chabad Religion." Vocals for the album were provided by Yotan Ben Horin. According to one source, the album was inspired by a request from a rabbi in Los Angeles for setting the traditional songs to punk music.

=== Other projects ===
Ben Horin has also been active in other bands/projects. In 1999, while touring with Useless ID, Ben Horin founded the hardcore punk band DPA (Dr Pepper Addicts) with guitarist Arik Mon. The two added Yehuda Yace and Ido Blaustein (then Useless ID drummer), and started playing shows, immediately garnering a lot of attention from the Israeli punk scene, later on singer Kasha joined the group. The band released one album, Straight Out of the Basement (also released under the name Dr. Pepper Can), on Useless ID's own label Falafel Records. The band broke up in 2001, after two years of activity in which the band was acclaimed as one of Israel's finest hardcore bands. The band reunited in 2007 for a short tour across Israel.

In late 2002, Ben Horin founded the grunge band Superdrive, together with Ofer Gelder, Moshe Liberman (later session drummer for Useless ID) and Rotem Inbar (later from groove outfit Betzefer). The band's only album, Dear Enemy, was released in 2004. The band broke up later that year, but in late 2005, Ben Horin decided to bring the band back, with new members Guy Shechter and Russel Groos. This incarnation lasted until 2006, only producing a few live shows. Two of the songs Ben-Horin originally wrote for Superdrive – "Isolate Me" and "Shallow End" – made it to Useless ID's 2008 album, The Lost Broken Bones.

In 2004 Ben Horin joined Israeli singer Shy Nobleman as a live bass player, and also played on Nobelman's second album, Beautiful Life. Ben-Horin has also played live bass for Danny Sanderson, one of Israel's most successful pop rock musicians. As a favor, Sanderson also joined to play two songs with Useless ID on their release concert for their latest album The Lost Broken Bones, on October 18, 2008. During his performance with the band, they also performed one classic song in Hebrew, "Ha'galshan Sheli" ("My Surfboard"), a song by Sanderson himself.

Ben Horin also worked as a producer for various Israeli punk rock bands. In 2008, he produced the second album by young pop punk band Beat 69, Banot Ohavot Banim Hazakim (Girls Like Tough Boys). Later in 2008, he produced a Various Artists compilation of Israeli punk bands, titled punkrock.co.il for the new Israeli punk website and magazine. The compilation featured two previously unreleased tracks by Useless ID and DPA, as well as songs by Beat 69, Kill The Drive and Got No Shame.

Ben Horin has produced pop punk band Kill the Drive's second studio album, A Postcard from Hell which was released in Japan in May 2009 through Radtone. He has also produced the song "City Lights" and all of the vocals on Got No Shame's debut full-length album Hometown Underground. Most recently, he has produced post-hardcore act This Means You's debut album The Act.

On August 25, 2010, Yotam's grunge side project Superdrive has reunited once again for a reunion show at the Sublime club in Tel Aviv. The show was followed by another reunion show on November 19, 2010, at the Ozen Bar in Tel Aviv.

On October 28, 2011, Ben Horin has joined indie rock musician Shy Nobleman as his live bassist at the show which took place during the InDnegev Festival. Ben-Horin has previously played in Nobleman's live band during 2004–6, as well as on his second album Beautiful Life, and this was his first performance with Nobleman since early 2008 (when he rejoined him briefly).

In February 2012, Superdrive announced once again that they will be reuniting for a few live shows. Two shows were announced: one at the Ozen Bar in Tel Aviv on February 18, 2012, and one at the Syncopa in Haifa on March 6, 2012.

On March 28, 2013, Ben Horin was chosen as an additional guitarist and vocalist to play with classic Israeli rock band Kaveret, on their reunion performances of 2013.

== Musical influences ==
In his MySpace, Ben Horin states his influences as John Lennon, Brian Wilson, Black Francis, Kurt Cobain, Ken Andrews, Blake Schwarzenbach, Nick Drake, Henry Rollins and Elliott Smith.

Ben Horin also enjoys listening to such artists as AC/DC, Nirvana, The Clash, ABBA, Autolux, Black Flag, Foo Fighters, Blonde Redhead, Blondie, The All-American Rejects, Man Alive, My Bloody Valentine, Kiss, ALL, Pink Floyd, Pixies, Smashing Pumpkins, The Police, Queen, Weezer, Sonic Youth, Sean Lennon, Minor Threat, David Bowie, Dinosaur Jr., The Get Up Kids, Jimmy Eat World, Depeche Mode, Green Day, Fugazi, Dead Kennedys and more.

== Solo band members ==
- Yotam Ben Horin – lead vocals, guitar (2010–present)
- Jamie Hilsden – guitar, vocals (2010–2011, 2013–present)
- Amir "Jango" Rusiano – bass, vocals (2011–2012)
- Ran Shimoni – drums, percussion (2013–present)

Former members

- Or Edry – bass, vocals (2011–2012)
- Aviv Cohen – drums, percussion (2011–2012)
- Zoe Polanski – bass, vocals (2010–2011)
- Guy Fleisher – drums, percussion (2010–2011)
- Corey Swift – drums, percussion (2010)

== Discography ==
=== With Useless ID ===
- Dead's Not Punk (1997)
- Get in the Pita Bread Pit (1999)
- Bad Story, Happy Ending (2001)
- No Vacation From The World (2003)
- Redemption (2005)
- The Lost Broken Bones (2008)
- Symptoms (2012)
- State Is Burning (2016)

=== With DPA ===
- Straight Out of the Basement (2001)

=== With Superdrive ===
- Dear Enemy (2004)

=== With Shy Nobleman ===
- Beautiful Life (2005)
- Yomi Hu Halom (יומי הוא חלום, My Day is a Dream) (2013)

=== With Danny Sanderson ===
- Lo Yafrid Davar (לא יפריד דבר, Nothing Will Separate) (2009)

=== Solo ===
- Home Recordings (2011)
- Distant Lover (2012)
- Yotam Ben Horin / Dan Cribb Acoustic Split EP (2015) (Split with Dan Cribb)
- Between the Lines (2015) (Split with Mike Noegraf and Phil Park)
- California Sounds (2015)
- Yotam Ben Horin One Week Records (2017)
- Young Forever (2022)

=== Production credits ===
- Beat 69 – Banot Ohavot Banim Hazakim (2008)
- Various Artists – punkrock.co.il (2008)
- Kill The Drive – A Postcard from Hell (2009)
- Got No Shame – Hometown Underground (2009)
- This Means You – The Act (2010)
- Kitat Omanut - Hafla Ashkenazit (2013)
- Kitat Omanut - Rock Israeli (2015)
- Stay Awake - Portraits - Production consultant (2021)
