= Making Love (album) =

Compilation album by Atom and His Package
- Released: 1999
- Genre: Pop punk
- Length: 34:56
- Label: No Idea Records

Atom and His Package chronology
Atom And His Rockage EP (1998)	Making Love (1999)	A Society of People Named Elihu (1999)

Professional ratings
Review scores
Source	Rating
Allmusic	link

Making Love is an album by Atom and His Package, composed of B-sides, EP exclusives, and rarities originating from various artist compilations.

== Track listing ==
1. "(Lord It's Hard to Be Happy When You're Not) Using the Metric System" - 2:50
2. "Nutrition" - 2:12 (The Dead Milkmen cover)
3. "Hats Off to Halford" - 1:40
4. "Pumping Iron For Enya" - 2:45
5. "Bloody Lip" - 0:18 (I Hate You cover)
6. "It's A Mad Mad Mad Mad Mad Mad Mad Mad Lib" - 1:59
7. "Thresholds to Adult Living" - 2:47 (Fracture cover)
8. "He Kissed Me (Rock Version)" - 1:47
9. "Avenger (Rock Version)" - 2:41
10. "Atom and His Package (Rock Version)" - 2:27
11. "Head (She's Just A...) (Rock Version)" - 1:51
12. "Head of Septa, Nose of Me" - 2:04
13. "Karpathia" - 1:40
14. "Son of Poop and George" - 0:45 (Sockeye cover)
15. "Getaway Car" - 1:28
16. "What WE Do On Christmas" - 2:30
17. "P.P. (Doo-Doo)" - 3:12
