= Making Love – A Conspiracy of the Heart =

2003 novel by Marius Brill

Making Love - A conspiracy of the Heart
- Author: Marius Brill
- Language: English
- Genre: Comedy
- Publisher: Doubleday
- Publication date: 2003

Making Love - A conspiracy of the Heart is a comic novel by Marius Brill first published in 2003 by Doubleday in the UK. The book was among the topics for discussion at a session on comedy writing featuring Brill at the 2008 Henley Literary Festival on 20 September.
