= Mooki (singer) =

Israeli musical artist (born 1975)

Mooki מוקי
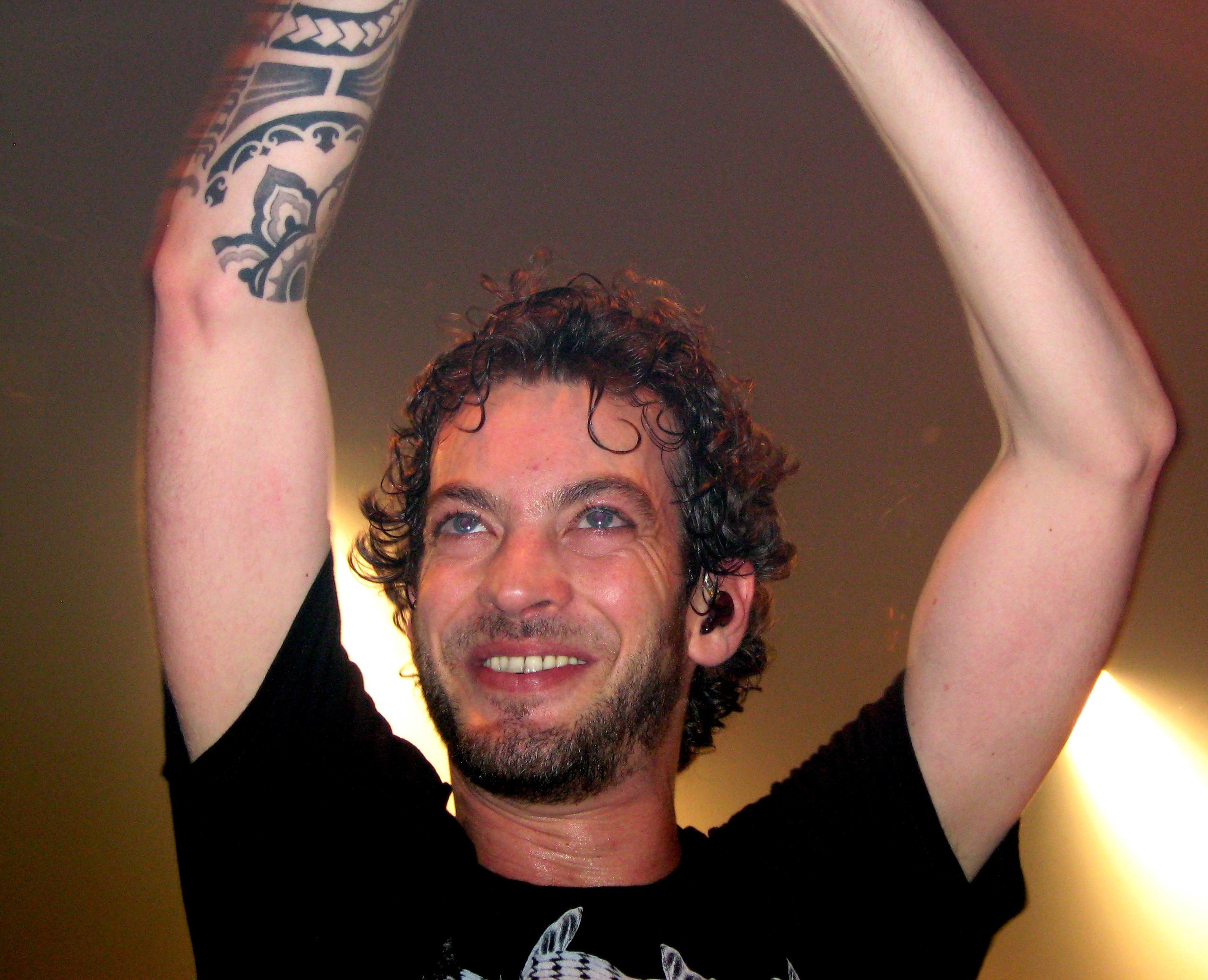
- Mooki during a performance in Beer Sheva, March 2010

Background information
- Born: Daniel Neyburger; March 2, 1975 (age 51)
- Origin: Rishon LeZion, Israel
- Genres: Hip hop, reggae, punk rock, alternative rock, gangsta rap
- Occupations: Musician, singer-songwriter, rapper
- Instrument: Vocals
- Years active: 1992–present
- Labels: NMC Music, Shabak Music

Danny Niv (Hebrew: דני ניב; born March 2, 1975, in Rishon LeZion, Israel), better known as Mooki (Hebrew: מוקי) is an Israeli singer and rapper, best known as the frontman for the Israeli hip hop/punk act Shabak Samech between 1992 and 2000, and again since 2007. He is also a successful solo artist. In Shabak Samech, he was also known by the nickname Mookie D, given him due to the resemblance of his voice to the voice of Mike D of the Beastie Boys.

== Biography ==
He was born Daniel Neyburger (Hebrew: דניאל נייבורגר), to a Latvian-Jewish and Russian-Jewish family.

Mooki became a musician at the age of 17, when he formed the hip hop act Shabak Samech with a group of friends. The band proved successful among Israeli youth and sold thousands of records. The band was active from 1992 until 2000, releasing three studio albums and one live album. The band reunited in 2007 for a short tour across Israel and a new album.

After the disbandment of Shabak Samech in 2000, Mooki went on to a successful solo career, in collaboration with his Shabak Samech co-member Piloni (Danny Kark). Mooki's first solo album was Shma Israel (שמע ישראל) which was released in 2001. The band was successful, sold 25,000 copies and went gold. The album included guest appearances from artists such as Yuval Banai, Kwami and more. Successful singles from the album included "מדברים על שלום" (Talking About Peace), which was written about the will for peace at the days of the Second Intifada, "ילדה סוכר" (Sugar Girl) and "האדמה בוכה" (The Land Cries) which featured Yuval Banai. The same year, Mooki was chosen as "Singer of the Year" in Israeli radio station Galgalatz's year's end awards.

In 2002, Mooki played a small role in the Israeli movie Broken Wings. In 2003, he had a role in the first season of the Israeli TV show שבתות וחגים (Weekends and Holidays), and in 2004 he had a role in the movie תיאום כוונות" (Adjusting Sights). In the years 2016-2019, he starred in the main male role in the first, second and third seasons of the TV series Metumtemet alongside Bat-Chen Sebag. He was in the 2023 production of Broadway Nights at Habima Theatre.

In 2005, Mooki released his second solo album – Okef Mi'Lemala (עוקף מלמעלה) which was also recorded with Piloni, who composed, produced and arranged all of the songs. The biggest hit from the album was the single "עוקף מלמעלה" (Coming from Above). The album was released on a label Mooki and Piloni formed the same year, called Shabak Music. In 2006, Mooki performed vocals on the song "מעצבי דעת הקהל" (Shapers of Public Opinion) on the album Al Ha'Mishmeret by Rami Fortis and Berry Sakharof. In 2007, he performed a new song with Izhar Ashdot called "מטעי הדובדבן של אוקראינה" (Ukraine's Cherry Plantations), and on the song "החיים" (The Life) with Shlomo Artzi. In April 2008, Mooki released his third album Be'emet ve Mikarov (באמת ומקרוב) which was an acoustic album, featuring acoustic renditions of songs from his two previous albums. The album featured an acoustic cover of "לומדת לעוף" (Learning to Fly) by Dana Berger, featuring Dana Berger. Also in 2008, Shabak Samech, who reunited back in 2007 for a short tour across Israel, released their fourth studio album, Boom Carnival.

In 2009, Mooki recorded a punk rock album with the Israeli punk rock band Useless ID. Mooki wrote the lyrics and Useless ID frontman and bassist Yotam Ben-Horin was responsible for the music and arrangements. Mooki and Useless ID started performing live shows together in August 2009, with the album released on January 7, 2010, followed by a special release show on January 28, 2010, at the Barby club in Tel Aviv, Israel. Mooki states that the collaboration started when Mooki spotted the band performing live at the Motorola 'MotoMusic' event and asked the band to collaborate, which led to the recording of the song "לא רוצה להתבגר" (Don't Want to Grow Up), which became the theme song for the Israeli sitcom Ramzor. After the recording, Mooki showed Useless ID frontman Yotam Ben-Horin some more songs he wrote, and, within days, Ben-Horin had arranged the lyrics with his own music into full songs, which led to the band entering the studio with producer Yossi Fine to record an album.

== Discography ==
=== Solo ===
- Shma Israel (שמע ישראל, Listen Israel) (2001)
- Okef Mi'Lemala (עוקף מלמעלה, Coming from Above) (2005)
- Be'emet ve Mikarov (באמת ומקרוב, Up Close and Personal) (2008)
- Lev Hofshi (לב חופשי, Unfettered Heart) (2014)
- Yeled Shel Aba (ילד של אבא ההופעה, Father's Son - Live) (2015)

=== With Shabak Samech ===
- Shabak ('שב"ק ס, Shabak) (1995)
- Be'atifa shel Mamatak (בעטיפה של ממתק, In a Candy Wrap) (1997)
- Shabak Be'hofa'a (שב"ק ס' בהופעה February 20, 1998, Shabak live) (1998)
- C'naan 2000 (כנען 2000, Kna'an 2000) (2000)
- Boom Carnival (בום קרנבל, Boom Carnival) (2008)

=== With Useless ID ===
- Mooki & Useless ID (2010)
