= Ishay Berger =

Israeli musician

Ishay Berger ישי ברגר
- Born: July 8, 1978 (age 46)
- Origin: Haifa, Israel
- Genres: Punk rock, pop punk, alternative rock, hardcore punk, grindcore, brutal death metal
- Occupation(s): Musician, guitarist, singer-songwriter
- Instrument(s): Guitar, vocals, bass
- Years active: 1994–present
- Labels: Suburban Home, Kung Fu, Falafel

Ishay Berger (Hebrew: ישי ברגר; born July 8, 1978, in Haifa, Israel) is an Israeli musician best known for his work as the lead guitarist for Israeli punk rock band Useless ID and the bassist of brutal death metal/grindcore act Whorecore.

== Professional career ==
=== Useless ID (1994–present) ===
Berger was one of the founding members of punk rock band Useless ID, when the band was formed in Haifa in 1994. He founded the band as the lead guitarist, along with lead vocalist and rhythm guitarist Guy Carmel, bassist Adi Alkavatz, and drummer Ralph Huber. Only two years after their formation, the band was already touring worldwide independently, mostly in the United States, but also Europe and Japan.

The band released its first full-length album, Dead's Not Punk, in September 1997, through the band's own independent label Falafel Records. The band's second full-length album Get in the Pita Bread Pit was released in 1999, also through Falafel Records, and Let it Burn, the band's split album with The Ataris, was released in April 2000 on Kung Fu Records and was the last to feature the band's rhythm guitarist Guy Carmel on lead vocals. This was when bassist Yotam Ben-Horin took the role of lead vocalist and lead composer and songwriter for the band.

Following the band's split album with The Ataris, the band was offered a record contract in Kung Fu Records. The band then went on to release their international major releases, in all Berger played lead guitar as well as singing backing vocals: Bad Story, Happy Ending (2001), No Vacation from the World (2003), Redemption (2005) and most recently, the band's critically acclaimed and successful album The Lost Broken Bones released in October 2008, through their new label – Suburban Home Records. On all of these albums, Ben-Horin also wrote the majority of the material.

On January 27, 2011, Useless ID played their last show in support of The Lost Broken Bones at the Barby club in Tel Aviv, Israel, before taking off to record their new album at the Blasting Room in Fort Collins, Colorado. The band entered the Blasting Room on February 2, 2011, to begin recording the new album.

=== Whorecore (2010–present) ===
Upon Whorecore bassist Evil Haim leaving Israel to travel the Far East, and mostly India, Ishay Berger who was his co-member in the comedy punk trio Bo La'Bar was chosen as his replacement as a bassist in Whorecore until Haim returns.

Ever since joining the band in late 2009, Berger had the chance to play with the band in such big events as the Hellelujah Open Air in Herzliya in April 2010, the Showdown Festival in Tel Aviv, playing alongside his own main band Useless ID in May 2010, supporting Cannibal Corpse in Tel Aviv on July 8, 2010, playing the Summer Carnage Festival alongside Aborted, System Divide, The Fading and many more on July 21, 2010, and supporting Parkway Drive on their only Israeli show at the Barby club in Tel Aviv on November 25, 2010.

On April 19, 2012, the band released "Alai", the first single off the band's second studio album Makot. The single saw the band taking a different musical direction, towards more of a black metal sound, rather than the grindcore and death metal sound they embraced on their previous releases.

== Bo Labar/Tabarnak band members ==
- Ishay Berger – lead vocals, guitar
- "Evil" Haim Benyamini – lead vocals, guitar (mostly with Tabarnak)
- Matan Cohen – guitar, backing vocals
- Guy Geller – guitar, backing vocals
- Yair Kampel – bass, backing vocals
- Jonathan Harpak – drums, percussion
- Corey Ben Yehuda (w/ Tabarnak) – drums, backing vocals

Former members

- Nir Doliner – guitar, backing vocals

== Discography ==
=== w/ Useless ID ===
For a full discography, see Useless ID Discography

- Dead's Not Punk (1997)
- Get in the Pita Bread Pit (1999)
- Bad Story, Happy Ending (2001)
- No Vacation From The World (2003)
- Redemption (2005)
- The Lost Broken Bones (2008)
- Symptoms (2012)

=== w/ Bo Labar ===
- Bong Rock (2011)
- Shtaim (2012)
- Gimel (2013)

=== w/ Whorecore ===
- Makot (2012)

=== w/ Tabarnak ===
- Morris Academy (2018)
- Tabarnak Sharim Tabarnak (2020)
- Hok HaShalosh (2023)
