= Down Low (album) =

Studio album by Betzefer
- Released: 19 May 2005 (Israel); 6 June 2005 (Europe)
- Genre: Groove metal, metalcore
- Length: 37:31
- Label: Roadrunner
- Producer: Tue Madsen

Betzefer chronology
New Hate (2003)	Down Low (2005)	Freedom to the Slave Makers (2011)

Down Low is Israeli groove metal band Betzefer's first full-length studio album and major label debut on Roadrunner Records, as well as their only album on that label. It was released on 19 May 2005 in Israel and 6 June 2005 worldwide. It is the band's first release with current bassist Rotem Inbar.

"Down Low", "Early Grave" and "Running Against" were released as singles and videos were made for those songs. "Fuckin Rock 'n' Roll" was released for radio airplay and as a promotional CD single, but a video was not made for the song.

Although it was supposed to be the band's first album in a five-album deal with Roadrunner Records, the band left the label in December 2007, stating professional reasons, though numerous sources reported that it was the label that dropped the band for personal reasons with the band's behavior.

== Track listing ==
No.	Title	Length
1.	"Early Grave"	4:05
2.	"Down Low"	3:56
3.	"Fuckin' Rock 'n' Roll"	3:30
4.	"Under"	3:25
5.	"Running Against"	2:23
6.	"Brix"	2:16
7.	"Mark"	3:37
8.	"Split"	4:05
9.	"6's & 7's"	3:34
10.	"Black Inside"	6:37
Total length:		37:30

== Personnel ==
- Avital Tamir – vocals
- Matan Cohen – guitars
- Rotem Inbar – bass
- Roey Berman – drums, percussion
