= Adam Goren =

American singer-songwriter (born 1975)

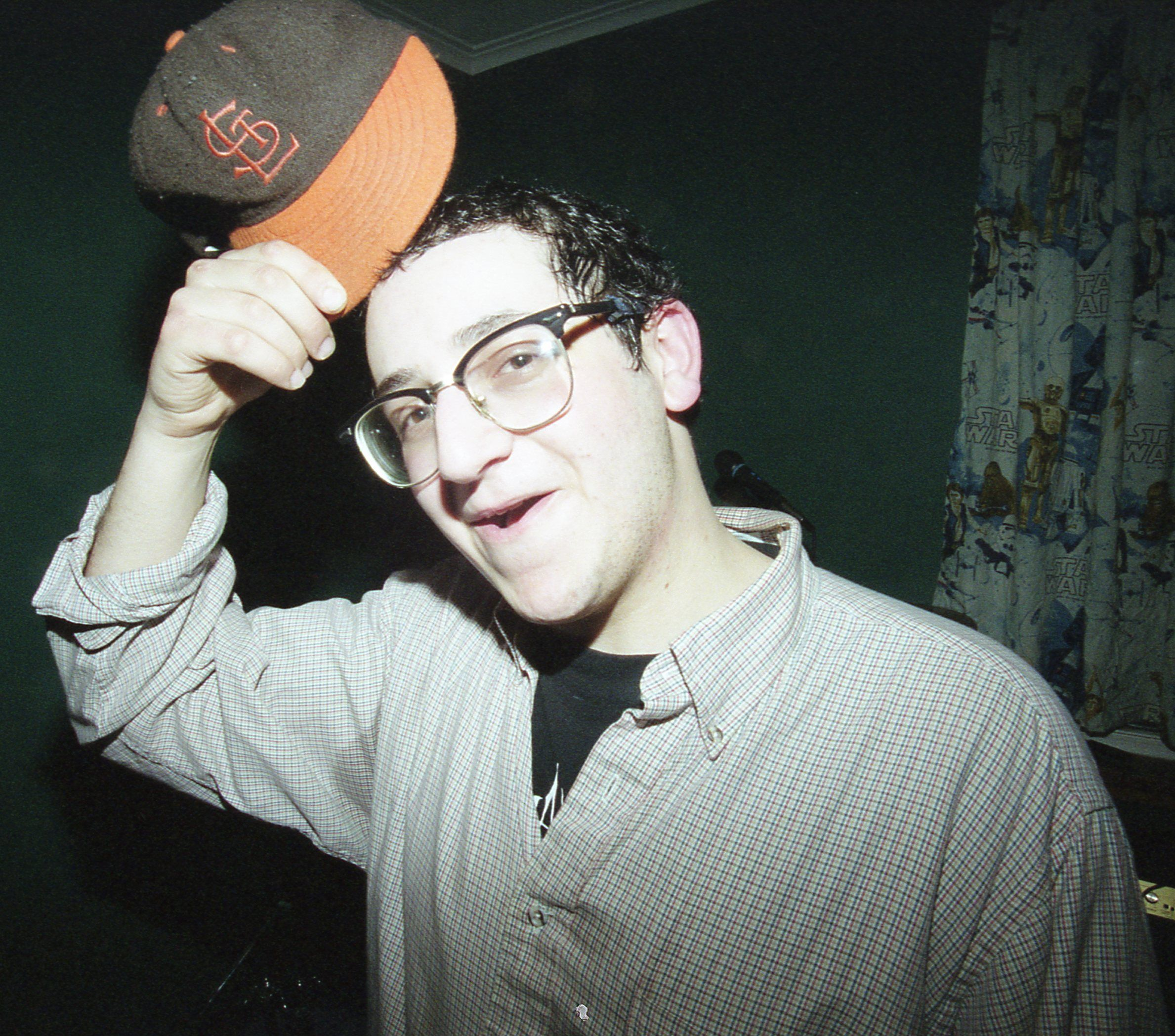
- Goren in 1999

Background information
- Also known as: Lobster Mobster
- Born: Adam Goren; January 14, 1975 (age 51); The Bronx, New York City, US
- Origin: Oreland, Pennsylvania, US
- Genres: Punk rock; indie rock; synthpunk; pop punk
- Occupations: Singer; songwriter; musician; teacher
- Instruments: Guitar; music sequencer; vocals
- Years active: 1997-present
- Labels: Bloodlink; The Mountain Cooperative; Vital Music Mailorder; Wabana; No Idea; Sub City; Don Giovanni
- Website: atomandhispackage.com

Adam Goren (born January 14, 1975), known by his stage name Atom and His Package, is an American singer, songwriter, musician and teacher. He has released more than 18 albums under various aliases. His music is identifiable by its heavy use of music sequencers, nasally, high vocal tone and frequent borrowing or referencing of lyrics from other bands and musicians.

== Biography ==
=== Background and music career ===
Goren was born on January 14, 1975, in The Bronx, and grew up in Oreland, Pennsylvania with his friend Brian Sokel, an inspiration for many of his songs. He played in several local bands as a youth. In 1991, Goren joined the punk band Fracture, and he remained with them until 1995. While Goren was still in school, friend and musician Andrew Dick introduced him to music sequencers, and he began writing music with one in his spare time. Later he started performing shows under the moniker Atom & His Package, consisting of himself, a B.C. Rich guitar, and his QY700 music sequencer, although exactly what "the package" consisted of changed throughout the years as Goren cycled through various sequencers and laptops.

In 1997 he released his first album, named The First CD, on Bloodlink Records. He released several more albums and EPs and has performed on several compilations, all while touring internationally.

In 2003, Goren ended Atom & His Package when his wife Jennifer Schumow-Goren got pregnant and he was diagnosed with Type 1 diabetes. In April that year he played what was intended to be the final Atom & His Package show in Philadelphia and released a CD/DVD package of the show's recording titled Hair:Debatable [sic] in 2004. He continued making music in punk band Armalite who released a self-titled full-length album in 2004, then took a hiatus from music.

On November 1, 2008, Goren returned for a performance as Atom & His Package at The Fest 7 in Gainesville, Florida.

On July 14, 2009, a tribute album to Atom & His Package entitled Up End Atom was released, featuring Steinbeck, MC Chris, Math the Band, The Zambonis, Yidcore, MC Lars, Worm Quartet, Curt Allen, Locas in Love, The Emotron, and Zolof the Rock & Roll Destroyer covering various Atom & His Package songs, and The Golden Bloom covering Atom & His Package's cover of Radon's "Lying to You." Goren himself performed the vocals on The Zambonis' cover of "Goalie."

In 2010 Goren began playing shows with punk cover band TV Casualty. In 2011, TV Casualty released a self-titled collection of six Misfits covers on vinyl, and Armalite released a new three-song EP titled Humungous [sic]. Armalite performed at The Fest 10 in October the same year.

In 2017, Adam Goren performed a short set as Atom & His Package on The Chris Gethard Show and a full set at The Fest 16.

On January 4, 2020, Goren and Greg Simpson collaborated on a cover of John Linnell's Montana and released the track on Bandcamp, with Goren credited as Atom & His Package.

In 2021 Adam formed Dead Best with Brian Sokel and released their debut album on Don Giovanni Records.

== Musical style ==
The songs of Atom and His Package generally consist of punk rock music put together with a sequencer and guitar. A few songs are purely instrumental, and as Goren's career went on, he started writing occasional songs that were more introspective or political in nature, yet still retained his classic tongue-in-cheek sense of humor and sarcastic wit. In a documentary on the Hair: Debatable DVD, Goren is on record explaining that he writes about whatever he happens to be thinking about at the time, whether it's observations of the world around him, events that happen to him, or people he is close to.

== Solo discography ==
=== Studio albums ===
- Atom & His Package, also known as The First CD (1997; Bloodlink Records)
- A Society of People Named Elihu (1997; The Mountain Cooperative)
- Making Love (1999; No Idea Records)
- Redefining Music (2001; Hopeless Records)
- Attention! Blah Blah Blah (2003; Hopeless Records)

=== Extended plays ===
- Behold, I Shall Do a New Thing EP (1998; Vital Music Mailorder)
- Gun Court EP (1998)
- Atom and His Rockage EP (1998; Wabana Records)
- Shopping Spree EP (featuring Har Mar Superstar) (2000; Sub City)
- Going to Ames: A Tribute to The Mountain Goats EP (2000) - A limited edition tribute album to The Mountain Goats; 500 were published.
- Hamburgers EP (2002; File 13)

=== Live albums ===
- Hair: Debatable (2004; Hopeless Records)
- Live on WPRB (2021; Self-released)

Adam Goren continues to work with Armalite, although he maintains a website under the name of Atom.

=== Compilations ===
- Punk Uprisings Vol. 2 (1997 Go-Kart Records)
  - "Punk Rock Academy"
- The My Pal God Holiday Record (1998 My Pal God Records)
  - "What WE Do on Christmas"
- Intellectos Manifesto (2000 Intellectos Records)
  - "Stephanie Says" (Velvet Underground cover)
- Flogging a Dead Cow: A Tribute to the Dead Milkmen (2001 Superpickle)
  - "Nutrition" (Dead Milkmen cover)
- Hopelessly Devoted to You Vol. 4 (2002 Hopeless/Subcity Records)
  - "Upside Down From Here" (from Redefining Music)
  - "Possession (Not the One By Danzig)" (previously unreleased)
- Operation: Punk Rock Freedom (2003 Hopeless/Subcity Records)
  - "Mustache TV" (from Attention! Blah Blah Blah)
- The Shape of Flakes to Come! (2003 No Idea Records)
  - "Radon" (Radon cover)
- Short Attention Span freebie spazzcore compilation (2009, Methodist Leisure Inc.)
  - "Bloody Lip" (I Hate You cover)

=== Tribute album ===
- Up End Atom (2009 Hartless Hind Records)
  - Goren himself appears on The Zambonis' cover of "Goalie"

== Filmography ==
Year	Title	Role	Notes
2017	The Chris Gethard Show	Musical Guest	Performed "Punk Rock Academy", "I'm Downright Amazed at What I can Destroy With Just A Hammer" and "(Lord It's Hard to be Happy When You're Not) Using the Metric System"
