= Useless ID =

Israeli punk rock band

Useless ID יוסלס איי.די
- Origin: Haifa, Israel
- Genres: Punk rock, pop punk, skate punk
- Years active: 1994–present
- Labels: Falafel Records (1994–2000); Kung Fu (2000–2008); Suburban Home (2008–2011); Fat Wreck Chords (2011–present)
- Members: Yotam Ben-Horin; Ishay Berger; Guy Carmel; Corey Ben Yehuda
- Past members: Ido Blaustein; Ralph Huber; Adi Alkabetz; Yonatan Harpak; Gideon Berger
- Website: uselessid.net

Useless ID (Hebrew: יוסלס איי.די) is an Israeli punk rock band, formed in Haifa in 1994.

== History ==
Useless ID was founded in 1994 as a four-piece: Guy Carmel - vocal and guitar, Ralf Hober - drums, Adi Elkabets - lead guitar, Nadav Elkabets - Bass. At its first years, the band was mainly active in the Israeli punk scene, and released two studio albums independently, on its own label "Falafel Records", named after band member's favorite food, the falafel. The band's singer at the time was rhythm guitarist Guy Carmel.

Two years after the band's formation, the four members decided to play shows in the United States and toured around the country for six months. This successful tour was followed by five more tours around North America, two around Europe and one in Japan. In 1996, upon returning to Israel from the tours, the band's bassist Adi Elkabets was replaced by Yotam Ben-Horin.

The band's international breakthrough happened in 1999, after The Ataris frontman, Kris Roe, heard the band and invited it to record a split album for Kung Fu Records. The album, titled Let It Burn, featured nine songs by the Ataris and seven by Useless ID. The song "Too Bad You Don't Get It" was also featured on Fat Wreck Chords' compilation, Short Music for Short People that same year. After the release of Let It Burn, the band signed to Kung Fu Records, and in 2001 the band's third studio album, Bad Story, Happy Ending, was released. The album was produced by Kris Roe. This was the first album by the band to feature bassist Yotam Ben-Horin on lead vocals. Ben-Horin eventually became the band's frontman and main composer and lyricist.

In 2003 the band released another album via Kung Fu, titled No Vacation from the World, with Angus Cooke co-producing the album with the band, and additional production by Tony Sly of No Use for a Name.

A year later, the band was featured in the Fat Wreck Chords' Rock Against Bush, Vol. 2 compilation, with the song "State of Fear". After returning to Israel, the band released its fifth album, Redemption, in December 2004 in Israel and Japan, and July 2005 in the rest of the world. This album was produced by Bill Stevenson of Descendents fame, and recorded at The Blasting Room in Colorado between March and April 2004. Drummer Ido Blaustein left the band prior to the recording of the album. Moshe Liberman played drums on the album, but Yonatan Harpak of Israeli punk band Punkache joined as the official drummer prior to the release of the album.

Still in 2004, the band took part in the movie "Jericho's Echo", directed by Liz Nord, which dealt with the Israeli punk and hardcore scene.

In September 2006, the band released a DVD, titled Ratfaces Home Videos Presents Useless ID, containing live and studio video clips of the band.

In 2008 the band returned to the Blasting Room, to record its sixth studio album, again with Stevenson as producer. On July 24, 2008, it was announced that the album, entitled The Lost Broken Bones, would be released via Suburban Home Records in October of that year.

After the recording of the album, the band left for a brief tour around the United Kingdom, and in June 2008, the band played live in Trafalgar Square, London, as part of the "Salute to Israel" event. After another tour in Japan and China in September, the band returned to Israel for a special release show of The Lost Broken Bones on October 18, 2008, at the Barby club in Tel Aviv, joined by famous musicians from the Israeli mainstream music scene, including Danny Sanderson, Muki and more.

The band finished off 2008 with an Israeli tour supporting The Lost Broken Bones, playing in Haifa, with Betzefer and Friday Night Sissy Fight, in Tel Aviv with Got No Shame and Kill the Drive, and in Jerusalem with Man Alive, Mondo Gecko and Evenyaru.

In Purim 2009, the band joined Betzefer and Almana Shchora for a special show in Tel Aviv.

After opening for No Use for a Name for two shows in Tel Aviv, Israel, Useless ID joined them as support on the remainder of their summer European dates during June and July.

In the summer of 2009, the band recorded an album in Hebrew, with Israeli hip hop/reggae artist Muki, in which the band wrote and played all the music, and Muki was responsible for all the lyrics. Useless ID singer Yotam Ben-Horin co-sings on some songs. The band celebrated the launch of the project with a tour across Israel, starting with the first show on August 15, 2009, at the Barzilay Club in Tel Aviv. The collaboration's launch show was on September 30, 2009, at the Reading 3 club at the Tel Aviv port.

In September 2009, Yotam Ben-Horin has finished recording his solo acoustic album, and started writing material for the next Useless ID album. The Muki and Useless ID collaboration album was released on January 7, 2010, followed by an official release show on January 28, 2010, at the Barby club in Tel Aviv.

In May 2010, frontman Yotam Ben-Horin confirmed that he had written most of the material for the band's next album, with only some writing left and plans to record the album in the end of 2010.

In July 2010, the band went on a European tour with Gideon Berger of Kill the Drive filling in on drums, as the band's drummer Yonatan Harpak could not leave the country.

In February 2011, the band recorded and mixed their next album at the Blasting Room in Fort Collins, Colorado with producer Bill Stevenson, with whom they had worked on their previous two albums. On January 30, 2011, Yotam Ben-Horin announced on his Facebook page that songwriting for the new Useless ID album was complete.

On February 16, 2011, the band released a compilation album, entitled The Lost Broken Tunes: Vol. 1. The compilation was released exclusively in Japan, and featured demos, outtakes, acoustic tracks and other rare tracks that didn't make the band's last album The Lost Broken Bones. A second volume, entitled The Lost Broken Tunes: Vol. 2 followed a month later, on March 16, 2011, and included older demos and unreleased material that dated back to 1999.

Useless ID planned to perform as a supporting act to Jello Biafra and the Guantanamo School of Medicine on July 2, 2011, at the Barby club in Tel Aviv, Israel, but three days before the show, Biafra announced that he would be cancelling his appearance for political reasons. In response, the band turned the concert into a free show, with supporting acts Bo La'Bar and Mondo Gecko, for all the disappointed fans.

On November 28, 2011, it was announced that Fat Wreck Chords had signed Useless ID and would release their next album. The resulting album, their seventh, was entitled Symptoms and was released on February 14, 2012. On January 10, 2012, the song "Before It Kills" was released as the first single off the new album, on the Fat Wreck Chords website, while the band debuted another new song, "New Misery", while playing a Vans sponsored show with Betzefer, on January 5, 2012. On February 21, 2012, Alternative Press premiered the music video for "Before It Kills", the first single off Symptoms. The same day, the band also released the power ballad "Somewhere" as a radio single, being the second single off Symptoms.

On March 7, 2012, it was announced that drummer Jonathan Harpak would be leaving the band after eight years, to pursue other musical projects. His replacement was announced to be guitarist Ishay Berger's younger brother Gilad Gilad - Gideon Berger, who is also the drummer for Haifa-based skate punk band Kill the Drive, and had played with Useless ID before, in 2010, as a touring member.

In June–July 2012, the band embarked on a European tour supporting Lagwagon, with a few headlining dates in between, supported by Gallows and Adept.

In October 2012, the band embarked on another tour supporting Lagwagon, along with The Flatliners and Dead to Me, this time touring the US and Canada. In November, they supported the German punk band Die Toten Hosen on their Ballast der Republik Tour in Germany, playing major arenas, in front of big crowds.

On June 17, 2013, the band released "Symptoms" as their third single of their album of the same name. An animated music video by young Israeli animation artist Yotam Goren was released for the single.

On October 4, 2015, the band played a special show at the Barby club in Tel Aviv, celebrating the 10 year anniversary of their 2005 album Redemption. During the show, the band announced they would be flying to the United States to record a new album in December.

On December 3, 2015, the band announced via their official Facebook page that it had begun recording a new studio album at The Blasting Room in Fort Collins, Colorado, with producers Bill Stevenson and Jason Livermore, who produced the band's previous three albums. Recording and mixing for the album was complete by December 19, 2015.

On April 15, 2016, the band announced that their eighth studio album - State Is Burning would be released on July 1, 2016, and released the first single off the album, "We Don't Want the Airwaves". It was announced that the single would be released on a 7-inch EP on May 6, 2016, that would feature the single, as well as three exclusive tracks: an album B-side that didn't make the cut for the album, as well as two acoustic outtakes, one of which is for the title track of the album.

== Band members ==
Current members

- Yotam Ben-Horin – bass (1996–present), lead vocals (2000–present), backing vocals (1996–2000)
- Ishay Berger – lead guitar, backing vocals (1996–present)
- Guy Carmel – rhythm guitar (1994–present), lead vocals (1994–2000), backing vocals (2000–present)
- Corey Ben Yehuda – drums (2016–present)

Former members

- Gideon Berger – drums (2012–2016)
- Jonathan Harpak – drums (2004–2012)
- Moshe Liberman – drums (2004)
- Ido Blaustein – drums (2000–2004)
- Ralph Huber – drums (1994–2000)
- Adi Alkabetz – bass, backing vocals (1994–1996)
- Nadav Alkabetz – lead guitar, backing vocals (1994–1996)

Timeline

== Discography ==
=== Studio albums ===
- 1997 - Dead's Not Punk (Falafel Records/Yo-Yo Records)
- 1999 - Get in the Pita Bread Pit (Falafel Records)
- 2001 - Bad Story, Happy Ending (Kung Fu Records)
- 2003 - No Vacation From The World (Kung Fu Records)
- 2005 - Redemption (Kung Fu Records)
- 2008 - The Lost Broken Bones (Suburban Home Records)
- 2012 - Symptoms (Fat Wreck Chords)
- 2016 - State Is Burning (Fat Wreck Chords)

=== EPs and splits ===
- 1995 - Demo (Hashsub) (Falafel Records)
- 1995 - Room of Anger (Falafel Records)
- 1997 - Split with All You Can Eat (Farmhouse Records)
- 1998 - Split with Spyhole (Yo-Yo Records)
- 2000 - Split with Tagtraum (Vitaminepillen Records)
- 2000 - Let It Burn, split with The Ataris (Kung Fu Records/Yo-Yo Records)
- 2003 - Split with Man Alive (Dying Is Deadly Records)
- 2004 - Attack of the B-Killers, split with Man Alive, Yidcore and Atom and His Package (Boomtown/MGM)
- 2010 - Muki & Useless ID (Hatav Hashmini)
- 2016 - We Don't Want the Airwaves (Fat Wreck Chords)
- 2018 - Split with Topsy Turvy's (Jerkoff Records/Ratgirl Records)
- 2018 - Among Other Zeros and Ones, split with Tarakany! (Jerkoff Records/Ratgirl Records)
- 2019 - 7 Hits From Hell (Fat Wreck Chords)

=== Compilations ===
- 2011 - The Lost Broken Tunes: Vol. 1
- 2011 - The Lost Broken Tunes: Vol. 2
- 2021 - Most Useless Songs (Fat Wreck Chords)

=== Compilations contributions ===
- 1996 - Breaking the Cultural Curfew - "Is It Right" (Beer City Records)
- 1998 - No Fate Vol. IV - "Something" (H.G. Fact Records)
- 1999 - Short Music for Short People - "Too Bad You Don't Get It" (Fat Wreck Chords)
- 2000 - You Call This Music?! Volume 1 - "Lonely Heart" (Geykido Comet Records)
- 2004 - Rock Against Bush, Vol. 2 - "State of Fear" (Fat Wreck Chords)
- 2008 - Avoda Ivrit (Hebrew Work) - "Lu Hayiti Pirat" ("If I Was a Pirate")
  - A four-CD compilation of Israeli songs celebrating the 60th anniversary of the establishment of Israel.

=== DVDs ===
- 2006 - Ratfaces Home Videos Presents Useless ID
