= Man Alive (band) =

- Origin: Jerusalem, Israel
- Genres: Punk rock
- Years active: 1999–present
- Labels: B& Recordings, The Militia Group, Sterile Records
- Members: Jamie Hilsden; David Shkedi; Jon Shkedi; Yair Braun
- Past members: Jeremy Boyd; Joel Hilsden; Bethany Ridings; Matthew R C Smith

Man Alive is an Israeli punk rock band, formed in 1999 in Jerusalem, by members Jamie Hilsden on vocals and guitar, Jeremy Boyd on bass guitar and Joel Hilsden on drums.

== History ==
The band was formed by vocalist and guitarist Jamie Hilsden, bassist Jeremy Boyd and drummer Joel Hilsden. The band was later accompanied by second guitarist Bethany Ridings.

In 2000, a year after forming, after Boyd and Ridings left the band, Jon Shkedi joined to play bass and Dave Shkedi joined to play guitar. Later, Joel left and was replaced briefly by Matthew R C Smith on drums before Yair Braun came on board.

The band quickly gained popularity in the Israeli punk scene, and decided to try to play outside of the country. While touring between Israel and the United States, the band independently released two albums, which helped build the band a fanbase in Europe, North America and Japan. In 2005, record producer Ed Rose (The Get Up Kids, Motion City Soundtrack) produced the band's third full length, Open Surgery, their most popular album to date. After the release of the album the band went on an extensive tour and, in 2006, played more than 220 shows in North America and over 30 in Europe, including the Warped Tour.

In 2007, the band released an EP titled Access Denied!, and also opened for NOFX in their Tel Aviv concert. The band also signed a two-album contract with B& Recordings, a subdivision of Doghouse Records, and a fourth, self-titled full-length was released on February 26, 2008.

Since 2008, the band has kept a low profile, performing rarely around the Tel Aviv area with local Israeli punk rock acts, many times sharing stages and supporting Useless ID.

In April 2011, Jon Shkedi flew with Israeli melodic hardcore band Kill the Drive to New York City, to record bass on their third studio album, as their bassist Nadav Rotem was unable to join the band. The record was recorded at Nada Recording Studio with producer Jon Naclerio. It was later announced that Shkedi will be officially joining the band as their permanent bassist.

On June 11, 2012, it was announced on the band's Facebook page that the band has decided to record a new album. The album, their first in four years, will be recorded in September 2012, though the band started a campaign on the Indiegogo website to raise money for them to record the new album. Fans can contribute money on the website for the band to be able to pay all of the recording, production, mixing and mastering fees for the new album.

On August 6, 2013, the band released a new song entitled "Limited to a Lifetime", as well as announcing their upcoming new album, A Light Goes On, set for release on September 12, 2013. The album is the band's first in five years.

== Band members ==
=== Current members ===
- Jamie Hilsden – lead vocals, guitar (1999–present)
- David Shkedi – lead guitar, vocals (2000–present)
- Jon Shkedi – bass, vocals (2000–present)
- Yair Braun – drums (2005–present)

=== Former members ===
- Matthew R C Smith – drums (2004)
- Joel Hilsden – drums (1999–2005)
- Jeremy Boyd – bass (1999–2000)
- Bethany Ridings – guitar, vocals (1999–2000)

== Discography ==
Studio albums

- Foreign Concepts (Man of Israel Records, 2001)
- Work in Progress (Sterile Records, 2002 – reissued on Dying Is Deadly in 2003)
- Open Surgery (The Militia Group, 2005)
- Man Alive (B& Recordings, 2008)
- A Light Goes On (self-released, 2013)

EPs and splits

- Split with Useless ID (Dying Is Deadly Records, 2003)
- Attack of the B-Killers – Split with Useless ID, Yidcore and Atom and His Package (Boomtown/MGM Records, 2004)
- Access Denied! EP (Smithseven, 2007)
