= Betzefer =

Israeli groove metal band

Betzefer בצפר
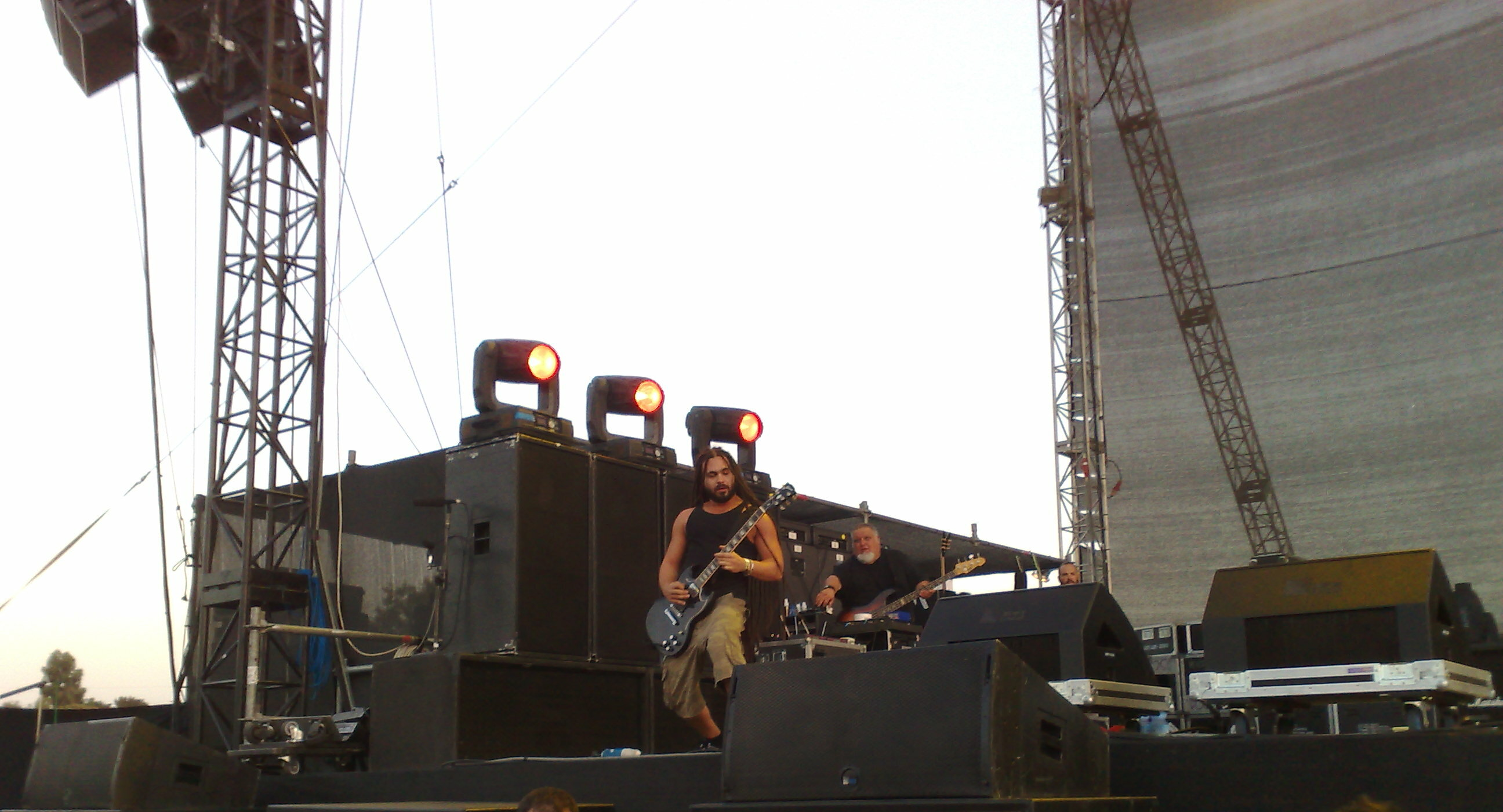
- Betzefer at Ozzfest Tel Aviv 2010

Background information
- Origin: Maccabim-Re'ut, Israel
- Genres: Groove metal, metalcore
- Years active: 1998–present
- Labels: AFM, Roadrunner
- Members: Aharon Ragoza; Matan Cohen; Rotem Inbar; Roey Berman
- Past members: Avital Tamir; Evil Haim; Mashy
- Website: Betzefer on Facebook

Betzefer (Hebrew: בצפר) was an Israeli groove metal band originating from Maccabim-Re'ut. The band was formed up in 1998 and was signed to Roadrunner Records from 2005 to 2007. Betzefer is notable for becoming Israel's first heavy metal band to have released its debut album on a major heavy metal label.

Betzefer's biggest influence is Slayer, while Pantera and Sepultura are also credited as being major influences. The band's second album was produced by Down producer Warren Riker.

== History ==
=== Early years (1998–2004) ===
Betzefer was formed in 1998 for a one-off high school gig. This fact is the origin of the band's name, which is an ad lib translation of the Hebrew term "Beit Sefer", meaning "school". The original lineup included singer Avital Tamir, guitarist Matan Cohen, drummer Roey Berman and bassist Menashe "Mashy" Hazan. Following the usual gigs as a cover band and several replacements of the bass players, Betzefer started their own songwriting. 1999 saw the release of their first demo followed in 2000 by the EP, Pitz Aachabar ("Pitz the Mouse"), a parody on a popular Hebrew children song. In 2001 they released the EP Some Tits, but No Bush and later in 2003 the EP New Hate with new bass player Evil Haim (Haim Binyami), all self-financed and self-released.

Not long after the release of the EP, Evil Haim left the band, and stayed only to work as the band's soundman, additionally for the new band he formed after the departure from Betzefer, Whorecore. Rotem Inbar replaced him as the bassist.

=== Down Low, signing and departure from Roadrunner (2004–2007) ===
In June 2004 the band took off to Belgium to record their first full-length album, Down Low, with producer Kris Belaen to whom they were introduced by Sven De Caluwe of Aborted and Whorecore. They eventually recorded the album with Belaen, while the final mixing and mastering was done by Danish producer Tue Madsen. During the recordings, the band was offered by Fear Factory to tour with them as their supporting act. During their performances the band was noticed by the major label Roadrunner Records who signed the band to a 4-album contract. After the signing, the band came back to the studio to finish the recording.

On 19 May 2005, Down Low was released independently in Israel, and then on 6 June 2005 it was released internationally by Roadrunner Records, after which the band toured Europe intensively to promote it.

Beginning March 2007, They toured with Sepultura supporting their Dante XXI tour, supporting Lamb of God and Soulfly on their German tours and Chimaira on their UK tour, and through 2007 performed in such events as With Full Force festival in Germany and Planet Music in Austria. They were joined by Sepultura guitarist Andreas Kisser a few times for a performance of "Thunderstruck" by AC/DC. On 2 July 2007, Betzefer opened for Megadeth at the Hangar 11 in Tel Aviv, Israel.

In December 2007, Betzefer parted ways with Roadrunner Records, stating that the record label did not fit anymore for what the band was looking for, although various sources stated that the band was dropped by the label due to personal issues with the band. At the time, the band also stated they have already written most of the material for the upcoming album, which will not be released by Roadrunner.

=== Freedom to the Slave Makers (2008–2011) ===
On 10 March 2008, Betzefer opened for Machine Head at the Theater Club in Tel Aviv. At the show, the band performed all the songs from their upcoming second album. A few days later, the band entered the studio to start recording the new album.

On 21 May 2008, it was announced that Betzefer's upcoming second studio album would not be mixed and produced by Tue Madsen after all as previously announced, and that it will be instead mixed and produced by Grammy Award winner Warren Riker, who has produced albums for Down, Santana, Lauryn Hill and more. The band has commented that as much as they liked working with Madsen, they decided to work with Riker instead, since they have the option, because they do not want the new album to sound like the latest one, and they hope Riker will bring the new sound they look for. The band stated that their new songs will combine the old elements of the band's music along with new experimental material.

On 25 May 2008, Betzefer finished the recording of their second studio album and announced that the album is in its final mixing stages. They then performed at the Hellelujah Open Air, a donation heavy metal festival in Herzliya, Israel, on 30 May 2008, in which they said they were recording the crowd for a new song called "Doomsday" in which vocalist Tamir stated they needed to have people shouting gang vocals of the word "Day" in the chorus, for the record. At the show the band also played two new songs: "Doomsday" and "Best Seller". It was then announced that the current title for Betzefer's second studio album is Freedom to the Slave Makers and that the album will be released in September 2008 and not July 2008 as it was said before. Yet, since then, the album was delayed once again, this time to an unknown date in 2009.

On 24 April 2009, the band played at the 2009 edition of the Hellelujah Open Air in Herzliya, Israel, which was the band's only live performance for 2009. During the performance, the band announced that the album was once again delayed to an unknown date in 2010 since it was not mastered yet, and performed a new song, entitled "Heavensent", along with Tomer Jones of Whorecore.

In May 2009, it was announced that the album will go into the mastering stage between 18 and 25 May 2009, at West West Side Music Studios, in New Windsor, New York by Alan Douches, who previously worked with such bands as Through the Eyes of the Dead, Beneath the Massacre and A Life Once Lost.

On 27 August 2010, the band played their first show of 2010, at the Heavy Metal Tel Aviv as their alter ego band HC/DC which features the band members, with additional guitarist Alex Schuster, though the band played strictly AC/DC covers, and not any songs from Betzefer. Alongside the band played such acts as Sabaton, Tim "Ripper" Owens, Nightmare and Almana Shchora.

On 28 September 2010, the band performed as part of Ozzfest, taking place in Israel for the first time, alongside Ozzy Osbourne, Korn, Soulfly and Almana Shchora. The band played the whole new album at the show and has also hinted on a possible soon to be announced release date for the long delayed album.

On 24 October 2010, the band announced that artwork for the album had been completed. It was done by Shahar Hemo and Nir Doliner, with photography by Gal Hamo.

On 3 November 2010, it was finally announced that the band had signed a new record deal with AFM Records, who will release the band's second album Freedom to the Slave Makers worldwide in February 2011. On 5 January 2011, it was confirmed that the album would be released worldwide on 18 February 2011, with a special release show at the Barby club in Tel Aviv to follow on 3 March 2011. On 6 January 2011, the band revealed the album's artwork and track list. On 10 January 2011, it was announced that the album will be released in the US on 22 February 2011 through E1 Music.

On 20 January 2011, the band released the song "Nothing But Opinions", the first single from the upcoming album, for free listening through such Israeli sites as Walla!, Nana 10 and Musicspot. On 16 February 2011, the album was uploaded for free streaming on the band's Facebook and Myspace pages.

On 16 June 2011, Betzefer went on their first European tour in support of Freedom to the Slave Makers, and their first international tour since 2007. The tour included some headlining dates as well as supporting slots for Cavalera Conspiracy and Gwar, and a slot on the With Full Force festival, which the band had not played since 2005. The tour ended on 2 July 2011.

=== The Devil Went Down to the Holy Land (2012–2016) ===
On 30 May 2012, the band played as the support act to Lamb of God, while the later played the Hangar 11 in Tel Aviv, Israel.

On 11 August 2012, the band announced on their official Facebook page that they have finished recording their third album, which will contain 13 tracks and will be called Suicide Hotline. The band started a campaign through the website Indieagogo to raise money for them to be able to mix and master the new album, which was planned to be mixed by Tue Madsen in September.

On 2 September 2012, Avital Tamir and Matan Cohen flew to Antfarm Studios in Aarhus, Denmark, to mix and master the album with Tue Madsen, who mixed their first album Down Low, as well as some additional recording. Mixing and mastering was finished on 9 September 2012.

On 13 April 2013, the band shot a music video for their upcoming new single "Sledgehammer" at the Galit skate part in Tel Aviv, inviting fans to participate in the shooting.

On 29 July 2013, the band announced they have signed a new record deal with known German label SPV/Steamhammer Records, a label that served as a home for many acts such as Sepultura, Kreator, Motörhead, Whitesnake, Judas Priest and more.

On 13 August 2013, the band played as a support act to Anthrax, who played in Israel for the first time, at the Barby club in Tel Aviv.

On 31 August 2013, the band unveiled the cover art for their upcoming album The Devil Went Down to the Holy Land, announcing it will be released on 28 October 2013. On 24 October 2013, the band announced that the album would be released on 25 November 2013 and not on 28 October as previously announced, with a special release on 22 November in Germany through Steamhammer/SPV.

=== Departure of Avital Tamir and new album (2016–present) ===
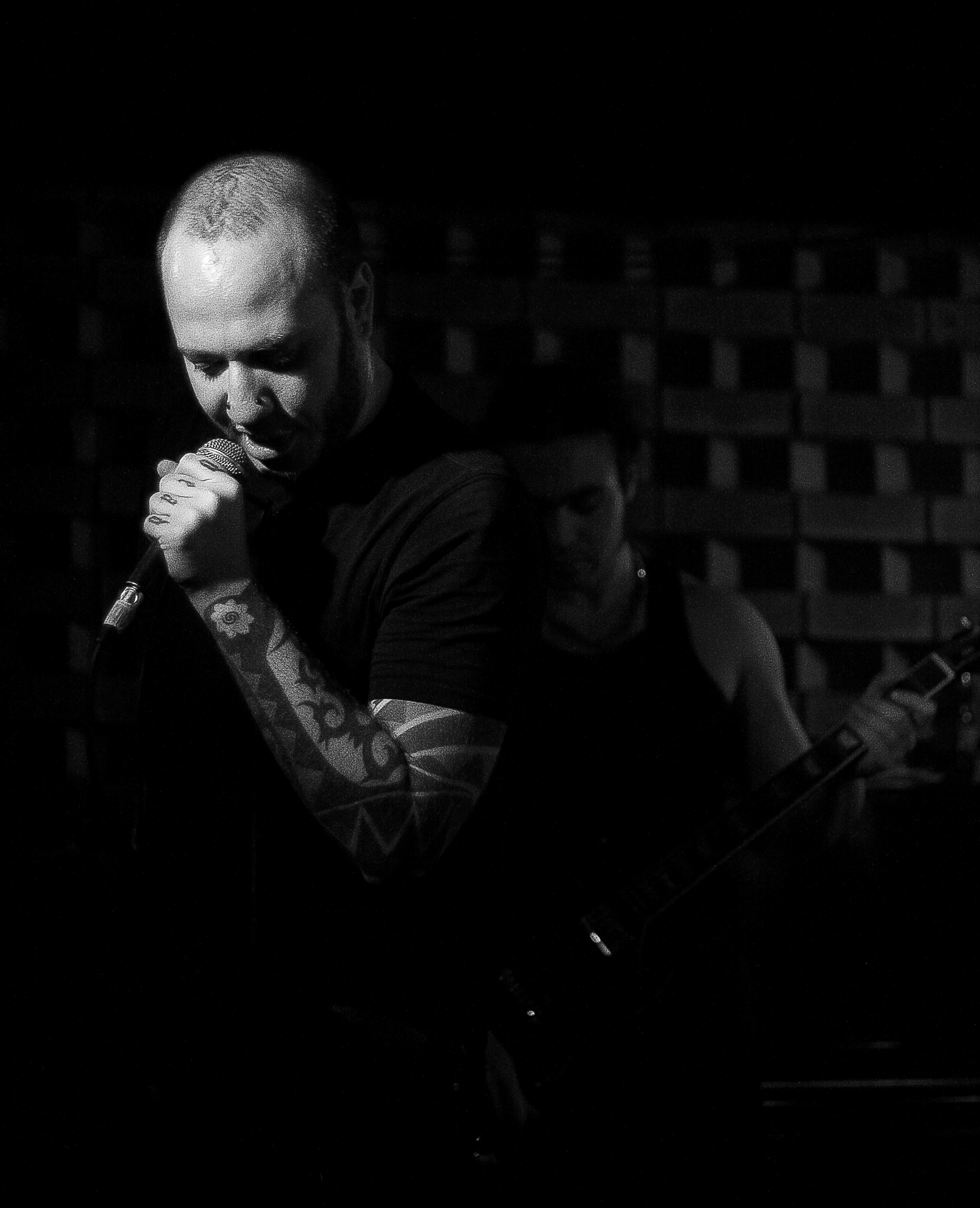
Former vocalist Avital Tamir

On 31 May 2016, it was announced on the band's Facebook "We're back", the band's first sign of activity since releasing the music video for "Can You Hear Me Now?" and performing a one-off show in Tel Aviv in October 2014.

On 13 June 2016, guitarist Matan Cohen announced on his Facebook page that the band would be entering the studio the next day to start recording a new studio album, the band's first in almost three years. On 15 June 2016, he uploaded a photo of him and bassist Rotem Inbar tracking bass for the album, to his Facebook page.

On 17 June 2016, it was announced that lead vocalist Avital Tamir had departed the band six months ago to focus on his indie/folk project On Shoulders of Giants, thus leaving the band without a vocalist for a while. It was also announced that replacing Tamir would be Shredhead vocalist Aharon Ragoza, who would be recording the new album with the band, and performing his first show with them on 17 August 2016, at the Barby club in Tel Aviv.

== Musical style and influences ==
Betzefer's musical style is mostly regarded as groove metal, influenced by bands such as Slayer, Pantera and Sepultura, although in an interview with an Israeli extreme sports magazine, vocalist Avital Tamir also stated Guns N' Roses and Metallica as influences. The band disproves any labeling on their genre and vocalist Avital Tamir stated in an interview that their genre is purely rock or alternative rock, and that they see themselves mostly as part of the Israeli alternative rock scene, and that no one of the band members even saw himself as a metalhead before, and the connection between the band and metal music is simply because the music is fast, heavy and harsh.

In another interview with Avital Tamir and Matan Cohen, they stated AC/DC, Aerosmith and Black Sabbath as their rock-rooted influences. They also mentioned they have influences ranging from hard rock and heavy metal through punk and even blues.

Slayer is thought to be the band's biggest influence, since in their biggest hit single "Down Low" the last verse of the song praises Slayer's album Reign in Blood as "the best damn fuckin' album ever". They also play the opening riff of the Slayer song "Raining Blood" in almost every concert, as a finish to their song "Down Low".

== Band members ==
=== Current members ===
- Aharon Ragoza – vocals (2016–present)
- Matan Cohen – guitar (1998–present)
- Rotem Inbar – bass (2003–present)
- Roey Berman – drums (1998–present)

=== Former members ===
- Avital Tamir – vocals (1998–2016)
- Evil Haim – bass (2001–2003)
- Menashe "Mashy" Hazan – bass (1998–2001)

== Discography ==
=== Albums ===
- 2005: Down Low
- 2011: Freedom to the Slave Makers
- 2013: The Devil Went Down to the Holy Land
- 2018: Entertain Your Force of Habit

=== EPs ===
- 2000: Pitz Aachabar
- 2001: Some Tits, but No Bush
- 2003: New Hate
