= Poogy in a Pita =

Poogy in A Pita פוגי בפיתה

Studio album by Kaveret
- Released: July 15, 1974
- Recorded: February – March 1974
- Studio: Tritone Studios, Tel Aviv
- Genre: Pop rock, progressive rock
- Length: 33:05 (original release); 42:31 (reissue)
- Label: Hed Artzi
- Producer: Avraham Deshe

Kaveret chronology
| Poogy Tales (1973) | Poogy in A Pita פוגי בפיתה (1974) | Crowded in the Ear (1975) |

Poogy in a Pita (Hebrew: פוגי בפיתה, Poogy BePita) is the second album by the Israeli rock band Kaveret, released in 1974.

== Songs ==
About a year after forming the band and the release of the first album, Poogy Tales, the band released their second album, which succeeded less than their first album, but included many hits. Most of the albums' songs are new recordings of older songs of Danny Sanderson, mostly from the rock opera that preceded Kaveret. In this album, like their first, the songs were characterized by Nonsense and word play.

The greatest hit from the album, is "Natati La Khayay" (I Gave Her My Life) that was the Israeli entry in the Eurovision Song Contest 1974, and placed seventh in the competition final. The song "Okhel TaTzipornaim" (Eating the Fingernails) was originally a part of the rock opera "HaSipur Hamakhrid 'Al HaYeled MiBrazil" (The Horrific Story About the Boy from Brazil) (1971) and "Shir HaMekhiron" (The Price List Song) was originally a part of the "Poogy Opera" (1972). The song "Moshe Ken, Moshe Lo" (Moshe Yes, Moshe No) was originally called "Mushroom Revolution", and was written by Sanderson when he was in The Nahal Band.

The album also included a cover of the song "Hora He'akhzut" (Settlement Hora) that was performed by The Nahal Band at the evening of the Nahal Band songs. The album also included nonsense that was performed at the band's live shows "Sukar BaTe" (Sugar in the Tea) or "Shir Mekha'a (Antibiotiqa)" (Protest song (Antibiotics)) that was written by Yoni Rechter, a short parody about Bob Dylan, and the first song which Rechter sang in solo.

Some of the songs introduced new musical styles: The instrumental "HaTmanun Ha'Itter" (The Left-handed Octopus) included influences of oriental music. It was performed by "The Schnitzels", the beat band of Alon Olearthick and Sanderson, and played in the two versions of the Jerusalem Symphony Orchestra (Conductor: Zuzu Musa). Also the song "LeAmor 'E'Lavi" included Oriental influences. The song was written together with the qanun player, Abraham Slaman. The closing song "HaBalada Al Ari VeDerchi" (The Ballad of Ari and Derchi), is a progressive rock song, that wasn't a success in the band's live shows. In the song, Gidi Gov plays on a recorder, and Rechter plays mellotron, synthesizer and moog, which were unusual instruments for the band at the time.

In 1990, the album was re-released on a CD, along with four bonus tracks that weren't included in the original release. Most of the bonus tracks are improvisations that were played during the band's rehearsals.

== Commercial performance ==
The album made Kaveret the Band of the year in Kol Yisrael (for the second time), and the band's live shows continued to be a success. "Natati La Khayay" won the Song of the Year in 1974 and also reached the Israeli Annual Hebrew Song Chart. The songs "HaBalada Al Ari VeDerchi" reached No. 9 and "Shir HaMekhiron" reached No. 25 on the chart.

== Track listing ==
All tracks are written by Danny Sanderson, unless noted otherwise.

Side one
| No. | Title | Length |
|---|---|---|
| 1. | "Natati La Khayay" (Co-written with Alon Oleartchik) | 2:58 |
| 2. | "Moshe yes, Moshe no" | 3:14 |
| 3. | "Eating my Fingernails" (Co-written with Menachem Zilberman) | 2:32 |
| 4. | "About A'Labi" (Co-composed by Abraham Salman) | 4:05 |
| 5. | "Some Sugar in my tea" | 2:49 |
| Total length: | | 15:38 |

Side two
| No. | Title | Length |
|---|---|---|
| 1. | "Hora He'achzut" (Written and composed by Dov Seltzer and Yechiel Mar) | 3:32 |
| 2. | "The Octopus" (Instrumental) | 3:14 |
| 3. | "The Price List Song" | 3:20 |
| 4. | "Protest Song (Antibiotics)" (Written and composed by Yoni Rechter) | 0:49 |
| 5. | "The Ballad of Ari and Derchi" | 6:32 |
| Total length: | | 17:27 (33:05) |

== Personnel ==
- Danny Sanderson - vocals, guitars, music, lyrics
- Gidi Gov - lead vocals, tambourine, recorder on track 10
- Efraim Shamir - lead vocals, guitars, harmonica
- Alon Oleartchik - vocals, bass guitar, music, lyrics
- Yitzhak "Churchill" Klepter - vocals, electric guitar
- Yoni Rechter - vocals, piano, Fender Rhodes, Moog synthesizer, Oberheim synthesizer, Mellotron
- Meir "Poogy" Fenigstein - drums, percussion, spoken word and vocals as "Poogy"
