= Crowded in the Ear =

Crowded in the Ear צפוף באוזן

Studio album by Kaveret
- Released: 1975
- Recorded: 1975
- Studio: Tritone Studios, Tel Aviv
- Genre: Progressive Rock, Jazz, Soft Rock
- Length: 43:58 (original release), 55:04 (re-release)
- Label: Hed Artzi

Kaveret chronology
Poogy in a Pita פוגי בפיתה (1974)	Crowded in the Ear צפוף באוזן (1975)

Crowded in the Ear (Hebrew: צפוף באוזן, Tzafuf BaOzen) is the third and final studio album by Israeli rock band, Kaveret, released in 1975.

== Background ==
After the huge success of the band's first two albums (Poogy Tales and Poogy in a Pita), they decided to change musical direction. The first two albums were written by Danny Sanderson, while all the band members participated in writing this album. Each song was played through and the band decided whether to include it in the album. The band worked for six months on the album while living in a kibbutz.

The band members pursued different musical directions and contributed new influences to the band's sound. Yoni Rechter turned to progressive rock and was a member of the progressive rock duo 14 Octaves (along with Avner Kener) at the time. Efrahim Shamir and Alon Olearthick turned to jazz. The result was the band's most diversified album, but this cost the band many fans and finally led to the band's break-up in 1976.

== Songs ==
Only two songs were written entirely by Sanderson – "HaIsh Hakhi Mahir" (The Fastest Man) and "Inspector Piqeakh" (Clever Inspector) that reprised the band's original sound, characterized by melodic rock and nonsense. The humor was still present in songs such as "Golyat" (Goliath) a parody about the biblical story, "Lu Lu" and "Tango Tzfardeim" (Frogs Tango) and more.

The song "HaOlam Sameakh" (The World is Happy) was composed in the samba, a musical style that was popular in Israel at the time. The song was played after a skit in the band's shows. The song "Shi'ur Moledet" (Country Lesson) was originally composed by Shamir in Polish, and the lyricist Eli Mohar wrote Hebrew lyrics for the album. This song, along with other quiet songs in the album such as "Hi Kol Kakh Yafa" (She's So Beautiful), didn't initially become a success with the fans who expected humor, but as time passed the songs became amongst the favorites from the album.

The album's back cover was painted by Yossi Abulafia using images inspired by the album's songs in the style of Terry Gilliam's artworks for Monty Python.

== Reception ==
The third album sold 30,500 copies, fewer than the first two. The band's live shows also met with less success. Nonetheless, the band was the most successful band in Israel, winning "Band of the Year" for the third time in the Army Radio and the "Song of the Year" with "Goliat."

== Track listing ==
1. Golyat – Goliath (גוליית) – 3:24
2. Shir Malakhim – Sailors Song (שיר מלחים) – 3:22
3. Medina Qt'ana – Small State (מדינה קטנה) – 3:08
4. Tango Tzfardeim – Frogs Tango (טנגו צפרדעים) – 3:50
5. Inspector Piqeakh – Smart Inspector (אינספקטור פיקח) – 2:11
6. Shi'ur Moledet – Country Lesson (שיעור מולדת) – 3:09
7. HaOlam Sameakh – The World is Happy (העולם שמח) – 3:32
8. HaYsh Hakkhi Mahir – The Fastest Man (האיש הכי מהיר) – 3:21
9. Shir HaT'embel – The Idiot Song (שיר הטמבל) – 2:31)
10. Lekh Saper LeSavta – Go Tell to Grandma (לך ספר לסבתא) – 3:11
11. He Kol Kakh Yafa – She's So Beautiful (היא כל כך יפה) – 3:14
12. Lu Lu (לו לו) – 3:30
13. Sof HaHatzaga HaLaila – End of the Show Tonight (סוף ההצגה הלילה) – 0:48
14. Kakha Hi Baemtza – That's How She's in the Middle (ככה היא באמצע) – 4:47

=== Bonus tracks in the CD edition ===
1. "Tzafuf BaOzen – Haqdama Tizmortit" – Crowded in the Ear – Orchestral Prologue (צפוף באוזן – הקדמה תזמורתית) – 5:27
2. "Apchi" (אפצ'י) – 0:16 (a parody about Neomi Shemer's translation to The Beatles' Let It Be)
3. "Ma Ata Ro'e" – What Do You See (מה אתה רואה) – 0:42 (a parody on the song "MiDarom Tipatah T'ova" – "From the South Good will Come" by the Piqud HaDarom Band
4. "Tarzan (Yltur Khai)" – Tarzan (Live Improvisation) (טרזן – אילתור חי) – 1:51
5. "Mekhaqim LeShula" – Waiting for Shula (מחכים לשולה) – 2:50

== Band Members ==
- Danny Sanderson – vocals, guitars, music, lyrics
- Gidi Gov – lead vocals, tambourine
- Efraim Shamir – lead vocals, guitars, 12-string guitar, harmonica, bass guitar on track 5
- Alon Oleartchik – vocals, bass guitar, music, lyrics (except 5)
- Yitzhak "Churchill" Klepter – vocals, electric guitar
- Yoni Rechter – vocals, piano, Fender Rhodes
- Meir "Poogy" Fenigstein – drums, percussion, spoken word and vocals as "Poogy"
