= Poogy Tales =

Poogy Tales סיפורי פוגי

Studio album by Kaveret
- Released: November 1973
- Recorded: June – September 1973 February (Self-Service)
- Studio: Tritone Studios, Tel Aviv
- Genre: Rock, Pop, Progressive Rock
- Length: 44:43 (original release); 54:42 (CD reissue)
- Label: Hed Arzi
- Producer: Avraham Deshe

Kaveret chronology
| Poogy Tales סיפורי פוגי (1973) | Poogy in a Pita (1974) |

Poogy Tales (Hebrew: סיפורי פוגי, romanized: Sipurei Pugi) is the debut album by Israeli rock band, Kaveret, released in 1973. It is considered one of the most important albums in the history of Israeli music.

It is also amongst the best selling albums in Israel, with over 140 thousand copies sold.

== Background ==
Poogy Tales is the debut album of Kaveret. The album is based on the rock opera by the same name that Danny Sanderson recorded in 1972, together with his bandmates from The Nahal Band (Gidi Gov, Alon Oleartchik, Efraim Shamir, Miri Aloni, David Shanen and Tami Azaria). Gov, Oleartchik and Shamir went on to become members of Kaveret. Abraham (Deshe) "Pashanel" who signed the band and produced the album, suggested recording the opera as individual songs.

== Songs ==
Most of the album's songs were written by Sanderson, with some help from other band members with lyrics and music. Most of the songs were characterized by nonsense, wordplay and surrealistic stories. The music was influenced by 1960s bands, especially The Beatles.

The title track, "Shir HaMakolet" (The Grocery Song), the skit "Anshei HaAron" (People of the Closet) and the song "Lo Yad'anu Ma La'asot" (We Didn't Know What to Do), were taken from the rock opera. The song "HaMagafahim Shel Barukh" (Barukh's Boots) was taken from another rock opera named "HaYeled MiBrazil" (The Child from Brazil). "Yosi, Ma Nishma" (What's up, Yosi?) is an instrumental track composed by Sanderson in order to teach Yehuda Adar how to play the guitar. The song "BaYom U'VaLaila" (At Day and Night) was written by Sanderson as "The Cold Shoulder" at the age of 15 with his friend, Melisa Konel and originally performed by the duo with their band "The Catacombs". The song "Yeled Mizdaqen" (A Boy Growing Old) was based on an Army Radio skit named "Poogy Mitkhashmel" (Poogy gets electrocuted). Alon Oleartchik claimed that the music was too beautiful to be wasted on a skit, so he wrote serious lyrics that stand apart from the rest of the album. The songs "Yo Ya" and "Po Qavur HaKelev" (Here Lies the Dog/Therein lies the rub) are based on the double meaning of Hebrew proverbs and make use of unexpected meanings of certain sayings.

The album's artwork was created by Itamar Neumann, a friend of Sanderson.

== Reception ==
Poogy Tales was released in late 1973, after the Yom Kippur War. Before the war, the songs "Po Qavur HaKelev" and "Sherut Atzmi" (Self Service) did not get much radio play, and the band's humor did not always come across. Later, the album became a huge success both critically and commercially. The lighthearted and humorous tone of Poogy Tales appealed to the Israeli public after the trauma of the war, and the band's performances among reservists were also a great success. Kaveret concerts soon became a hit and approximately 70,000 albums were sold during the first year after its release. By the end of the 1980s, Poogy's Tales had sold more than 140,000 albums, making it one of the best-selling albums in the history of Israeli music.

The songs "HaMagafaim Shel Barukh" (chosen as song of the year by Army Radio and Kol Yisrael), "Shir HaMakolet" (No. 3 on the Army Radio hits chart), "Yeled Mizdaqen", "Po Qavur HaKelev" and "Yo Ya" were all successful on the radio. The band was chosen as "band of the Year" by Kol Yisrael.

== After the album ==
A year after the release of Poogy Tales, Kaveret released their second studio album, Poogy in a Pita, which was also a great success.

in 1989, Poogy Tales was re-released by the label "Hed Artzi" including new 5 bonus tracks that weren't included in the original release. The bonus tracks are a cover of the classic "Haiu Leilot" ('There Were Some Nights') in a rehearsal, and the humorous skits "Matemat'iqa" ('Mathematics') and "Shi'ur Psanter" ('Piano Lesson') that were recorded by Sanderson, Gov and Meir Fenigstein.

"Yo ya" was covered by the Australian punk band Yidcore in 2005 for that band's second album Eighth Day Slice.

In 2013, for the 40th anniversary for the album, the band reunited for the fourth time since its break up in 1976. In honor of the reunion, Israeli musicians and bands such as Mercedes Band, Kerach 9 and others performed cover versions of songs from the album as part of a special Army Radio project.

== Track listing ==
All tracks are written by Danny Sanderson unless otherwise noted.

Side one
| No. | Title | Length |
|---|---|---|
| 1. | "Poogy Tales" | 0:50 |
| 2. | "The Grocery Store" | 3:45 |
| 3. | "The cold shoulder" (Co-composed by Melissa Connell) | 3:11 |
| 4. | "Self-service" | 2:45 |
| 5. | "Things could be better" (Lyrics written by Alon Oleartchik) | 3:11 |
| 6. | "In Spite of it all" | 7:03 |
| Total length: | | 20:45 |

Side two
| No. | Title | Length |
|---|---|---|
| 1. | "The crux of the matter" | 2:45 |
| 2. | "The people in the closet" | 2:00 |
| 3. | "We didn't know what to do" (Co-composed by Ephraim Shamir) | 2:20 |
| 4. | "Joseph, what's happening?" | 2:45 |
| 5. | "Adulterous Boots" (Co-written by Alon Oleartchik and Menachem Zilberman) | 4:17 |
| 6. | "It was nice" | 4:44 |
| 7. | "Yo Ya" (Co-written by Alon Oleartchik and co-composed by Yitzhak Klepter) | 3:58 |
| Total length: | | 22:59 (43:44) |

=== CD Bonus tracks ===
Bonus tracks
| No. | Title | Lyrics | Music | Performers | Length |
|---|---|---|---|---|---|
| 1. | "Poogy 71" | Sanderson, Fingstein, Zilberman | | Sanderson, Fingstein, Zilberman | 0:05 |
| 2. | "Math" | Sanderson, Fingstein, Zilberman | | Fingstein, Zilberman | 1:31 |
| 3. | "Piano lesson" | Sanderson, Feingstein | | Feingstein | 4:11 |
| 4. | "Epharim's Boots" | Oleartchik, Sanderson, Zilberman | | Shamir | 1:11 |
| 5. | "There were nights" | Yaakov Orland | Mordechai Zeira | Kaveret | 4:00 |
| Total length: | | | | | 10:58 |

== Personnel ==
- Danny Sanderson - vocals, guitars
- Gidi Gov - lead vocals, tambourine
- Efraim Shamir - lead vocals, guitars
- Alon Oleartchik - vocals, bass guitar
- Yitzhak "Churchill" Klepter - vocals, electric guitar
- Yoni Rechter - vocals, piano, Fender Rhodes
- Meir "Poogy" Fenigstein - drums, percussion, spoken word and vocals as "Poogy"
- Tommy Friedman-recording engineering
- Avraham Deshe-production
