= She's So Beautiful =

Shes's So Beautiful may refer to:

- "She's So Beautiful", a song by Cliff Richard from the Dave Clark 1986 concept album Time
- "She's So Beautiful", a song by the band Aslan
- She’s so beautiful, (היא כל כך יפה), song by Israeli rock band Kaveret
