= Yossi Abolafia =

Israeli writer and graphic artist

Yossi Abulafia
- יוסי אבולעפיה
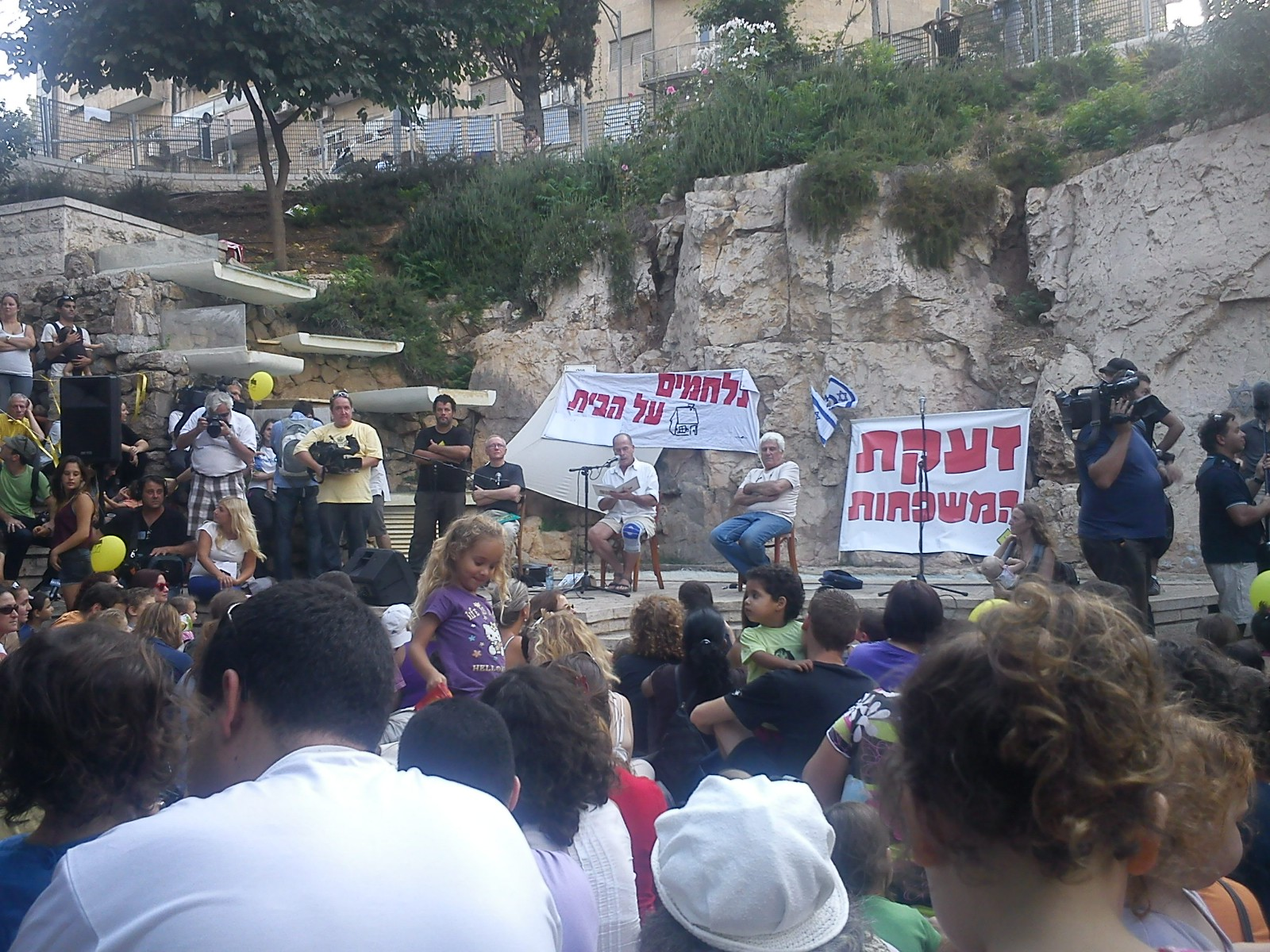
- David Grossman, Meir Shalev and Yossi Abulafia at the real estate protest in Gan Hasus, Jerusalem, 7 July 2011
- Born: 4 June 1944 (age 82); Tiberias, Mandatory Palestine
- Occupations: Writer and illustrator
- Website: https://yossiabolafia.com/

Yossi Abolafia (Hebrew: יוסי אבולעפיה; born 4 June 1944) is an Israeli writer and illustrator of children's books, as well as a graphic artist, cartoonist, director and screenwriter of animation films.

== Biography ==
Abolafia was born in Tiberias in 1944 in what was then the British Mandate of Palestine.

At age 17, he was accepted to Israel's national school of art "Bezalel Academy of Arts and Design". He graduated from the school after majoring in graphic design for 4 years. After his military service, Abolafia began to work in the Israeli Channel 1 as a graphic artist and cartoonist.

== Work ==
In 1975 Abolafia illustrated the back cover for Kaveret's third album Crowded in the Ear (צפוף באוזן) which was a collage of images illustrating the various songs on the album in the style of the famous Monty Python illustrations done by Terry Gilliam.

Towards the mid-1980s Abolafia moved to North America, where he worked for six years as an animation producer and as a director in both Canada and the United States. During these years Abolafia began to illustrate and write children's books, both for Israelis and for Americans.

In 1990 Abolafia published the children's book HaKina Nechama (Hebrew: Nechama the Head Louse) which was written by Meir Shalev and illustrated by Abolafia. The book, which humorously describes the adventures of a head louse, became very popular and influential in Israel and was adapted to other media numerous times.

In 1999 Abolafia created all the transition animated clips of the 1999 Eurovision song contest held in Israel, which were based on the stories of the Bible.

To date, Abolafia has illustrated more than 140 books (eight of them were written by him), and is widely known for illustrating the children's books written by Ephraim Sidon and Meir Shalev.

Abolafia used to illustrate for the Israeli newspapers Hadashot and Ma'ariv, and served as the head of the animation department at the Bezalel Academy of Arts and Design, which he established together with Hanan Kaminski.

== Personal life ==
Abolafia currently resides in the Israeli settlement of Har Adar, and serves as a senior lecturer in the animation department of the Bezalel Academy of Arts and Design.

== Awards ==
- 1978, Hounor list of Israel Museum Ben-Yitzhak award for the illustration of a children's book for his illustrations in "Alilot Ferdinand Pedatzur BeKitzur"
- 1990, Hounor list of Israel Museum Ben-Yitzhak award for the illustration of a children's book for his illustrations in "Adi Aba VeArbaim HaMotzetzim"
- 1992, Hounor list of Hans Christian Andersen Award for illustration by IBBY for his illustrations in "HaKina Nechama"
- 1993, Nahum Gutman Prize for Illustration
- 1998, Hounor list of Hans Christian Andersen Award for illustration by IBBY for his illustrations in "Et Ze!"

== Films ==
- Canada Vignettes: News Canada
- Friends of the Family
- Ottawa 82 Logo

== Published Works ==
=== English Books illustrated ===
- Buffy and Albert, by Charlotte Pomerantz (1982)
- Harry's Dog, by Barbara Ann Porte (1984)
- What I Did Last Summer, by Jack Prelutsky (1984)
- Harry's Mom, by Barbara Ann Porte (1985)
- Aviva's Piano, by Miriam Chaikin (1986)
- Donovan Scares the Monsters, by Susan Love Whitlock (1987)
- Leo and Emily's Zoo, by Franz Brandenberg (1988)
- The Birthday Thing, by Suann Kiser and Kevin Kiser (1989)
- Harry in Trouble, by Barbara Ann Porte (1989)
- My father always embarrasses me, by Meir Shalev (1991)
- Harry Gets an Uncle, by Barbara Ann Porte (1991)
- Am I Beautiful?, by Else Holmelund Minarik (1992)
- Taxicab Tales, by Barbara Ann Porte (1992)
- Stop, Thief!, by Robert Kalan (1993)
- A Turkey Drive and Other Tales, by Barbara Ann Porte (1993)
- Busybody Brandy, by Jessie Haas (1994)
- Harry's Birthday, by Barbara Ann Porte (1994)
- Clean House, by Jessie Haas (1996)
- Harry's Pony, by Barbara Ann Porte (1997)
- The Key to My Heart, by Nira Harel (2003)
- The Mystery of the Dead Sea Scrolls, by Hagit Allon and Lena Zehavi (2004)
- It's Snowing! It's Snowing!, by Jack Prelutsky (2006)
- My Parents Think I'm Sleeping, by Jack Prelutsky (2008)
- It's Valentine's Day, by Jack Prelutsky (2013)
- One Hundred New Apples, by Ora Morag (2014)
- The Golden Bell, by Tamar Sachs (2019)
- Moving Day, by Robert Kalan (2020)
- Ten Old Pails, by Nicholas Heller

=== Hebrew Books illustrated ===
- Tales of Ferdinand Pedatsort, For Short, by Ephraim Sidon (Hebrew: עלילות פרדיננד פדהצור בקיצור) (1976)
- It's Hard to Be a Lion, by Uri Orlev (Hebrew: קשה להיות אריה) (1979)
- No Laughing Matter, by Steven Lukes and Itzhak Galnoor (Hebrew: הצחקתם אותנו) (1985)
- Uzu and Muzu from Kakamaruzu, by Ephraim Sidon (Hebrew: אוזו ומוזו מכפר קאקארוזו) (1987)
- Zohar's Dimples, by Meir Shalev (Hebrew: גומות החן של זוהר) (1988)
- Songs in a Juice, by Ephraim Sidon (Hebrew: שירים במיץ) (1988)
- My Father Always Embarrasses Me, by Meir Shalev (Hebrew: אבא עושה בושות) (1988)
- Adi, Dad, and the Forty Pacifiers, by Amalia Argaman-Barnea (Hebrew: עדי אבא וארבעים המוצצים) (1989)
- Nehama the Head Louse, by Meir Shalev (Hebrew: הכינה נחמה) (1990)
- The Animals as a Fable, edited by Shelly Elkayam (Hebrew: החיות כמשל) (1991)
- Between Reality and Imagination, by Dr. Dafna Lemish (Hebrew: בין מציאות לדמיון) (1991)
- A kiss for Schpunza, by Lia Nirgad (Hebrew: נשיקה לשפונזה) (1991)
- Who Kidnapped Boaz?, by Yemima Avidar Tchernovitz and Dana Avidar (Hebrew: מי חטף את בועז?) (1992)
- e Isle of Nonsense, by Ephraim Sidon (Hebrew: סיפור מוזר ומלא תימהון על האי הקטן האי הגיון) (1993)
- How the Neanderthal Inadvertently Invented Kebab, by Meir Shalev (Hebrew: איך האדם הקדמון המציא לגמרי במקרה את הקבאב הרומני) (1993)
- The Tractor in the Sandbox, by Meir Shalev (Hebrew: הטרקטור בארגז החול) (1995)
- A Hippo in the Soup, by Yehuda Atlas (Hebrew: היפופוטם במרק) (1995)
- Glizo the Wanderer, By Ephraim Sidon (Hebrew: גליצו יוצא לנדוד בדרכים) (1997)
- This!, by Nira Harel (Hebrew: את זה!) (1997)
- A Monkey with Glasses, by Hana Goldberg (Hebrew: קוף משקפוף) (1999)
- Aunt Michal, by Meir Shalev (Hebrew: הדודה מיכל) (2000)
- The Key to My Heart, by Nira Harel (Hebrew: מפתח הלב) (2000)
- For Ever Under a Shadow, by Jacob Buchan (Hebrew: תמיד ילווה אותו צל) (2000)
- Double Parking, by Gil-Ad Harish (Hebrew: דבל פרקינג) (2000)
- Doctor Marshmello Mello, by Shlomit Cohen Asif (Hebrew: דוקטור מרשמלו מלו) (2002)
- A Story that Starts with a Kiss, by Shlomit Cohen Asif (Hebrew: סיפור שמתחיל בנשיקה ונגמר בחיבוק) (2003)
- Roni and Nomi and Jacob the Bear, by Meir Shalev (Hebrew: רוני ונומי והדב יעקב) (2003)
- A Lion in the Nights, by Meir Shalev (Hebrew: אריה בלילות) (2004)
- The Chickens and the Fox, by Haim Nahman Bialik (Hebrew: התרנגולים והשועל) (2005)
- That American Girl, by Susie Morgenstern (Hebrew: האמריקאית הזאת) (2006)
- Grendpa Aaron and his Rain, by Meir Shalev (Hebrew: הגשם של סבא אהרון) (2007)
- The Underplate, by Meir Shalev (Hebrew: הצלחת שמתחת) (2008)
- The Teddy Bear Ate a Soap, by Anda Pinkerfeld Amir (Hebrew: הדובון בלע סבון) (2009)
- Kremer the Cat Sleeps All the Time, by Meir Shalev (Hebrew: קרמר החתול ישן כל הזמן) (2010)
- Good People, by Naomi Shemer (Hebrew: אנשים טובים באמצע הדרך) (2012)
- Kremer the Cat Go to the Forest, by Meir Shalev (Hebrew: קרמר החתול יוצא אל היער) (2012)
- It Starts with a Boom and Ends with a Bang, by Shlomit Cohen Asif (Hebrew: מתחיל בבום ונגמר בטראח) (2012)
- Kremer the Cat Is a Swimmer, by Meir Shalev (Hebrew: קרמר החתול לומד לשחות) (2014)

=== Hebrew Books illustrated and written ===
- Baldy Hights (with Ephraim Sidon, Hebrew: מעלה קרחות) (1980)
- Zahava and the Three Uncles (Hebrew: זהבה ושלושת הדודים) (1986)
- Fox Tale (Hebrew: זנב ודבש) (1992)
- Numbers Tells a Story (Hebrew: מספרים מספרים) (1993)
- A Fishy Tale (Hebrew: דג לגברת שאלתיאל) (1998)
- The Book of Fables (with Ephraim Sidon, Hebrew: ספר המשלים הגדול) (2000)
- Snakes (Hebrew: Nehashim / נחשים) (2005)
- Yashka's Island (Hebrew: האי של יאשקה) (2006)
- Grandpa Yashka Saves the Bay (Hebrew: סבא יאשקה מציל את החוף) (2007)
- Dog, Cat & Man (Hebrew: כלב, חתול ואיש) (2009)
- You're Never Going to Believe This, But It's True (Hebrew: לא תאמינו, אבל זה מה שקרה) (2010)
- Yashka's Mountain (Hebrew: ההר של יאשקה) (2016)
- Machberet Hibur (Hebrew: מחברת חיבור) (2020)

=== English book translations - illustrated and written ===
- My Three Uncles (1985)
- A Fish for Mrs. Gardenia (1988)
- Yanosh's Island (1987)
- Fox Tale (1991)
- Dog, cat & man (2009)
