= Anat Gov =

Israeli screenwriter and playwright (1953-2012)

- ענת גוב
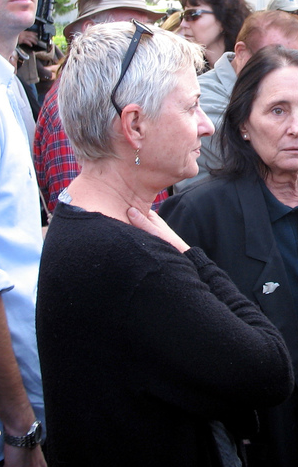
- Gov attending the funeral service of Eli Mohar in 2006
- Born: Anat Miber; 13 December 1953; Tiberias, Israel
- Died: 9 December 2012 (aged 58); Tel Aviv, Israel
- Occupations: Playwright; screenwriter; publicist; translator
- Spouse: Gidi Gov (m. 1977)
- Children: 3
- Writing career
- Years active: 1972–2012

Anat Gov (Hebrew: ענת גוב; 13 December 1953 – 9 December 2012) was an Israeli screenwriter and playwright.

== Biography ==
Born in Tiberias, Gov moved to Tel Aviv with her family when she was three years old. She graduated from Thelma Yellin High School of Arts with a degree in theater. In the early 1970s, she joined the IDF’s military entertainment troupe, where she met her husband-to-be, Gidi Gov. Gov later studied for a year at the theater department of Tel Aviv University followed by a short career as a stage actress, which she left after appearing in one play.

Gov found professional success as a writer. As a screenwriter, she wrote for television shows such as Zehu Ze! She also wrote the screenplay for her husband's satirical late-night show. As a playwright, many of the plays Gov wrote were brought to some of Israel's prominent theaters, such as Cameri Theater in Tel Aviv. She was also responsible for the Hebrew translation of international plays such as Via Dolorosa and Mother Courage and Her Children. Gov's most famous play, however, was 2011's Happy End, which explores the central protagonist's battle with cancer. In 2012, she received the Rosenblum Prize for the Performing Arts.

=== Political views ===
Gov was well known for her outspoken left-wing views and her support for Zionism. She became vocal in her political views following Yitzhak Rabin's assassination. Her most notable comment was when she stated that the Six-Day War was not truly over.

=== Personal life ===
Gov was married to the singer Gidi Gov from 1977 until her death in 2012; they had three children and, at the time of her death, two grandchildren. They lived in Ramat HaSharon.

She was outspoken about her own cancer diagnosis, and expressed her wish that society and the media spoke more openly and with less fear about cancer, and death in general.

== Death and legacy ==
Gov died in Tel Aviv following a long struggle with colorectal cancer on December 9, 2012, four days before her 59th birthday. Her obituary in Haaretz likened her minute preparations for her own death and funeral to those of the protagonist in her play Happy End.

She was buried at Menucha Nechona Cemetery in Kfar Saba, accompanied by Monty Python's satirical song "Always Look on the Bright Side of Life". More than 1,000 mourners attended her funeral, including Tzipi Livni, Shelly Yachimovich, and Mickey Rosenthal. At the funeral, her husband also recounted condolences from then-President Shimon Peres by letter and from then-Prime Minister Benjamin Netanyahu by phone.
