= Wonderful Journey (disambiguation) =

Wonderful Journey is a 2015 Malaysian film released on July 10.

Wonderful Journey may also refer to:

- A Wonderful Journey, 2024 Taiwanese television series starring Tsao Yu-ning, Kuo Tzu-chien, Yang Li-yin and Lyan Cheng
- A Wonderful Journey, Taiwanese artist Ariel Lin's studio album

== See also ==
- Aharoni & Gidi's Wonderful Journey, an Israeli documentary-reality TV series
