= Gazoz =

Gazoz may refer to:

== People ==
- Gazoz, Israeli pop rock band
- Mete Gazoz (born 1999), Turkish archer

== Beverages ==
- Uludağ Gazoz
