= Eli Mohar =

Israeli songwriter and columnist (1948–2006)

- עלי מוהר
- Born: 30 December 1948; Tel Aviv, Israel
- Died: 30 November 2006 (aged 57); Azor, Israel
- Occupations: Songwriter; columnist
- Years active: 1975–2006
- Children: 1
- Father: Yechiel Mar

Eli Mohar (Hebrew: עלי מוהר; 30 December 1948 – 30 November 2006) was an Israeli songwriter and columnist.

== Biography ==
Eli Mohar was born in Tel Aviv. His father was Yechiel Mohar. He was a member of HaMahanot HaOlim youth movement and studied at A.D. Gordon School before moving to Tichon Hadash. During his service in the IDF, he wrote for the military newspaper in addition to his paratrooper course training.

Mohar was married twice. From his first marriage to the actress Irit Alter, he had one daughter, Sharon. Towards the end of his life, Mohar was diagnosed with pancreatic cancer yet he continued to work. He later died in Azor on 30 November 2006, one month before his 58th birthday. He was laid to rest at Holon Cemetery.

== Songwriting career ==
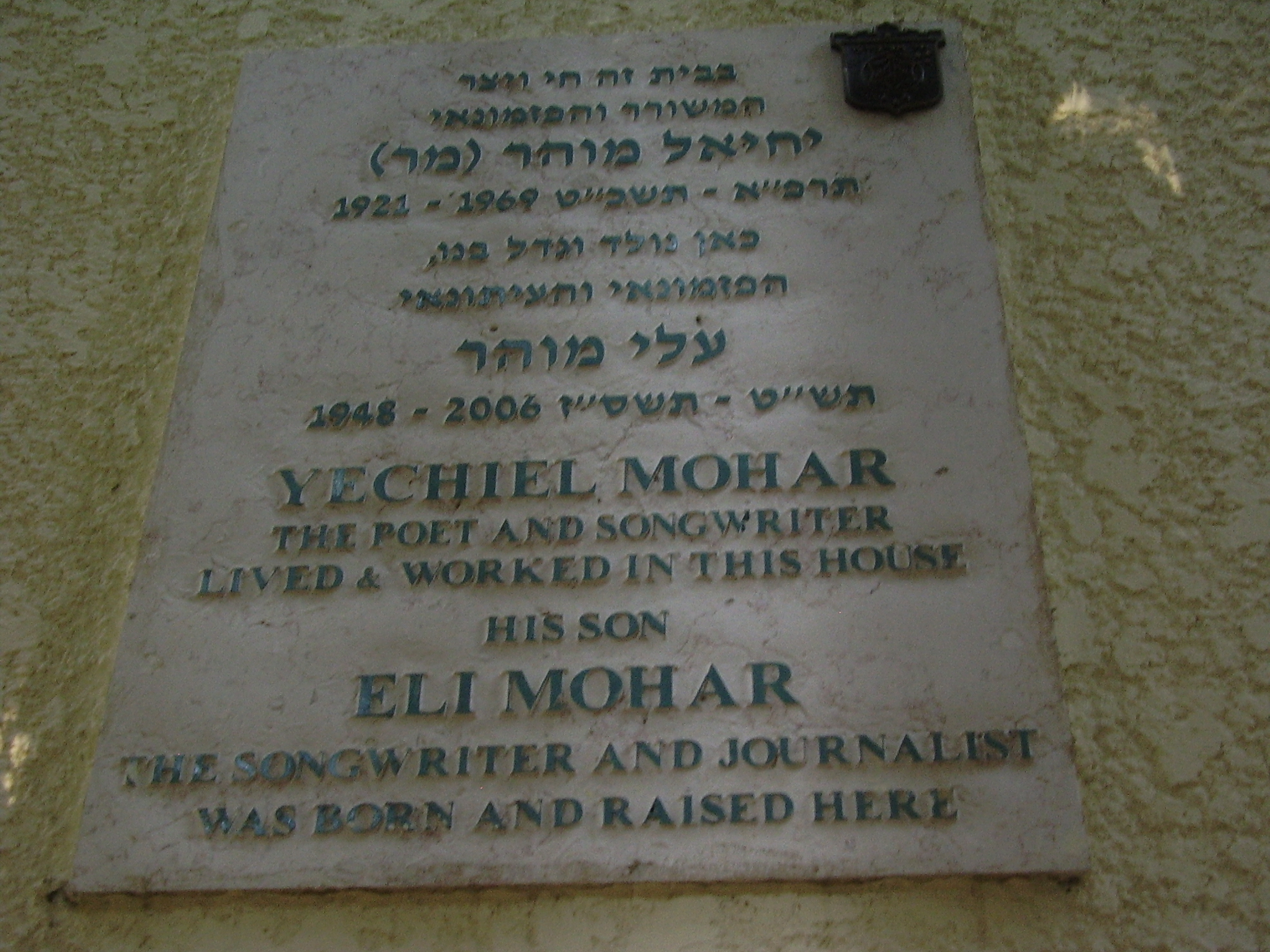
Memorial plaque in Tel Aviv

Mohar was well known as one of Israel's most renowned songwriters. His reputation as a songwriter was based mainly on his longtime and occasional collaborations with singers like Arik Einstein, Gabi Shoshan, Esther Ofarim, Gali Atari and Oshik Levi He was especially known for writing songs for the members of Kaveret such as Yoni Rechter, Gidi Gov, Ephraim Shamir, Yitzhak Klepter and Alon Oleartchik.

In 1994, Mohar released a compilation album which consisted nineteen of the songs he wrote for the artists he collaborated with. He also wrote the lyrics for the children's television show Rechov Sumsum.

== Journalism career ==
Mohar was also a renowned columnist. He held a weekly column in the weekly Ha'ir called Me'Hanasa Beirenu (Of what transpired in our city) from 1984, in which he opined in his staple mix of humour and sentimentality balanced by a tinge of sarcasm about his great loves: The city of Tel Aviv, City life, the Hebrew language, Paris. In a separate mini-column with Ha'ir he unabashedly hailed his other great loves, the Manchester United and "Hapo'el Tel Aviv" football clubs.

In addition to Mohar's journalism career, he served as a presenter on a late night radio show on Galei Tzahal between 1978 and 1983. He also served as a sports commentator alongside Avi Meller discussing English football.

== See also ==
- Music of Israel
