= Judaica Archival Project =

The Judaica Archival Project was founded in 1987 as a non-profit preservation and access program for Rabbinics. From 1988 to 1999 the Project operated a microfilm lab at the Jewish National and University Library (JNUL) of the Hebrew University. The Project was supported by private foundations, book lovers and from the sale of facsimile copies. Over half a million pages were filmed from thousands of rare and out-of-print Hebrew works.

The publishing field for religious books in Jewish law or Rabbinics is very active and classic works from the 15-20th century are reprinted frequently in small editions generally without copyright restrictions. The Otzrot HaTorah project, the Otzar HaHochma project and Hebrewbooks.org are a few examples of book scanners who have scanned together over 40,000 volumes of Hebraica and Rabbinics. However the pioneer in this field was the Judaica Archival Project.

From 1995 the Project pioneered the concept of a virtual library by posting catalogs and scans of rare books on its web site. Catalogs of other facsimile and reference book publishers were added with the goal of creating a central portal for Rabbinics and Jewish Studies. Recently, the web site was reorganized as the VirtualGeula portal, including some commercial Judaica sites in an effort to earn income for the project.

Over the last decade due to rapid changes in preservation technology microfilm has been replaced by digital media. The Project has adapted to these changes by changing from a static "film and save" strategy to a dynamic sharing of copies among a small group of Jewish publishers who are disseminating digital copies of Rabbinics and rare Hebrew books.

Major libraries are continuing to lose a substantial portion of their base collections due to paper acidification. As for Judaica and Hebraica the percentages are even higher due to inferior paper quality, low print runs, and the wilful destruction of Jewish books during the Holocaust.

The Judaica Archival Project continues to scan, save and exchange copies of every rare Sefer that readers can order for study. This sharing of resources although modest in scope, is more effective than large scale preservation projects, which are difficult to fund in the present economic climate.

The project had three programs:

- Copy-Scan-Save: Researchers obtain copies for study and preserve rare books for others
- VirtualGeula: A bookfinding and procurement service assisting scholars all over the world, closed in 2023
- A service assisting scholars and authors to advertise and market their works worldwide
