= Aharoni & Gidi's Wonderful Journey =

- המסע המופלא של אהרוני וגידי
- Genre: Documentary
- Created by: Yisrael Aharoni
- Directed by: Idan Levi (season 1); Zevick Gorodetski (seasons 2–7)
- Starring: Gidi Gov and Yisrael Aharoni
- Country of origin: Israel
- Original language: Hebrew
- No. of seasons: 7
- No. of episodes: 51

Production
- Executive producer: Tmira Yardeni
- Camera setup: Omri Takoa
- Running time: 45 minutes
- Production company: Tedy Productions Ltd.

Original release
- Network: Channel 10 (seasons 1–6); Reshet (season 7)
- Release: June 2011 – March 2020

The Amazing Journey of Aharoni & Gidi (Hebrew: המסע המופלא של אהרוני וגידי) is an Israeli documentary-reality TV series that explores and studies cultures, their history, religion, ceremonies and geography, through their reflection in the local food. The series follow Gidi Gov and Yisrael Aharoni through various countries all around the world.

== Plot ==
Aharoni and Gov every week partake in a different adventure. They explore multiple countries in each season. In each country they go explore remote areas, spectacular landscapes, meet with local people and enjoy their food.

== Starring ==
Both Gidi and Yisrael are TV stars in Israel.

Gidi is a singer, TV host, entertainer, and actor. Gidi provides the comic relief on the show.

Yisrael is a celebrity chef starring in multiple food shows in Israel. Due to his culinary background, Yisrael provides the food expertise during the show.

== Seasons ==
=== Season 1 - Silk Road ===
Season 1 premiered June 2011 and consisted of 7 episodes, which explored Turkey, China and Italy:

- Episode 1 – Sian – The beginning – the King's dumplings
- Episode 2 – Going West
- Episode 3 – All the way to the edge of China
- Episode 4 – Buchara. Aharoni searches for his roots
- Episode 5 – Eastern Turkey
- Episode 6 – Turkey and the Encounter with Biblical History
- Episode 7 – Pasta as Science – Italy

=== Season 2 - Street food ===
Season 2 consists of 6 episodes:

- Episode 1 – Vietnam, Rice
- Episode 2 – Myanmar, Lahpet
- Episode 3 – Morocco, Couscous
- Episode 4 – India, Panir
- Episode 5 – Thailand, Curry
- Episode 6 – Xinjiang, Nomads and settlers

=== Season 3 - Street food ===
Season 3 consists of 5 episodes:

- Episode 1 – Yunnan, Yiliang roast duck
- Episode 2 – Netherlands, Herring
- Episode 3 – South Korea, Kimchi
- Episode 4 – Ethiopia, Coffe and tef, part a
- Episode 5 – Ethiopia, Coffe and tef, part b

=== Season 4 - Street food ===
Season 4 consists of 9 episodes:

- Episode 1 – Japan, Tuna
- Episode 2 – Italy, Sandwich
- Episode 3 – India, Coconut
- Episode 4 – The Mekong River
- Episode 5 – Taiwan, Bamboo
- Episode 6 – Mexico, Corn
- Episode 7 – Peru, Potato
- Episode 8 – Brazil, Sugar Mandioca and beef, part a
- Episode 9 – Brazil, Sugar Mandioca and beef, part b

=== Season 5 - Street food ===
Season 5 consists of 7 episodes:

- Episode 1 – Japan, Soy
- Episode 2 – Taiwan, Oysters
- Episode 3 – Italy, Gelato
- Episode 4 – Mexico, Chocolate
- Episode 5 – Cambodia, Kampot pepper crab
- Episode 6 – India, Spices
- Episode 7 – Peru, Ceviche

=== Season 6 - Around the Mediterranean ===
Season 6 consists of 10 episodes:

- Episode 1 – Around the Mediterranean: Morocco
- Episode 2 – Around the Mediterranean: Sardinia
- Episode 3 – Around the Mediterranean: Greece
- Episode 4 – Around the Mediterranean: Albaniao
- Episode 5 – Around the Mediterranean: Liguria
- Episode 6 – Around the Mediterranean: The French Riviera
- Episode 7 – Around the Mediterranean: Valencia and Andalusia, Part a
- Episode 8 – Around the Mediterranean: Valencia and Andalusia, Part b
- Episode 9 – Around the Mediterranean: Israel Part a
- Episode 10 – Around the Mediterranean: Israel Part b

=== Season 7 - American Road Trip ===
Season 7 consists of 7 episodes, premier on 13 December 2018:

- Episode 1 – Cape Cod to NYC
- Episode 2 – NYC to Philadelphia
- Episode 3 – Philadelphia to Chicago
- Episode 4 – Chicago to Rapid City
- Episode 5 – Rapid City to Salt Lake City
- Episode 6 – Salt Lake City to South Lake Tahoe
- Episode 7 – South Lake Tahoe to San Francisco

=== Season 8 - Restaurants ===
In this season Aharoni and Gidi venture "Behind the scenes" of famous restaurants.

- Episode 1 – Italy
- Episode 2 – Ko Kut, Thailand
- Episode 3 – India
- Episode 4 – Georgia
- Episode 5 – Singapore
- Episode 6 – Poland
- Episode 7 – Thailand
- Episode 8 – England

== International syndication ==
Aharoni & Gidi's Wonderful Adventure can be seen in the United States on the Israeli Network.
