= National Library of Israel =

Jewish heritage library in Jerusalem

- הספרייה הלאומית
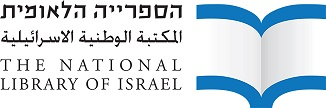

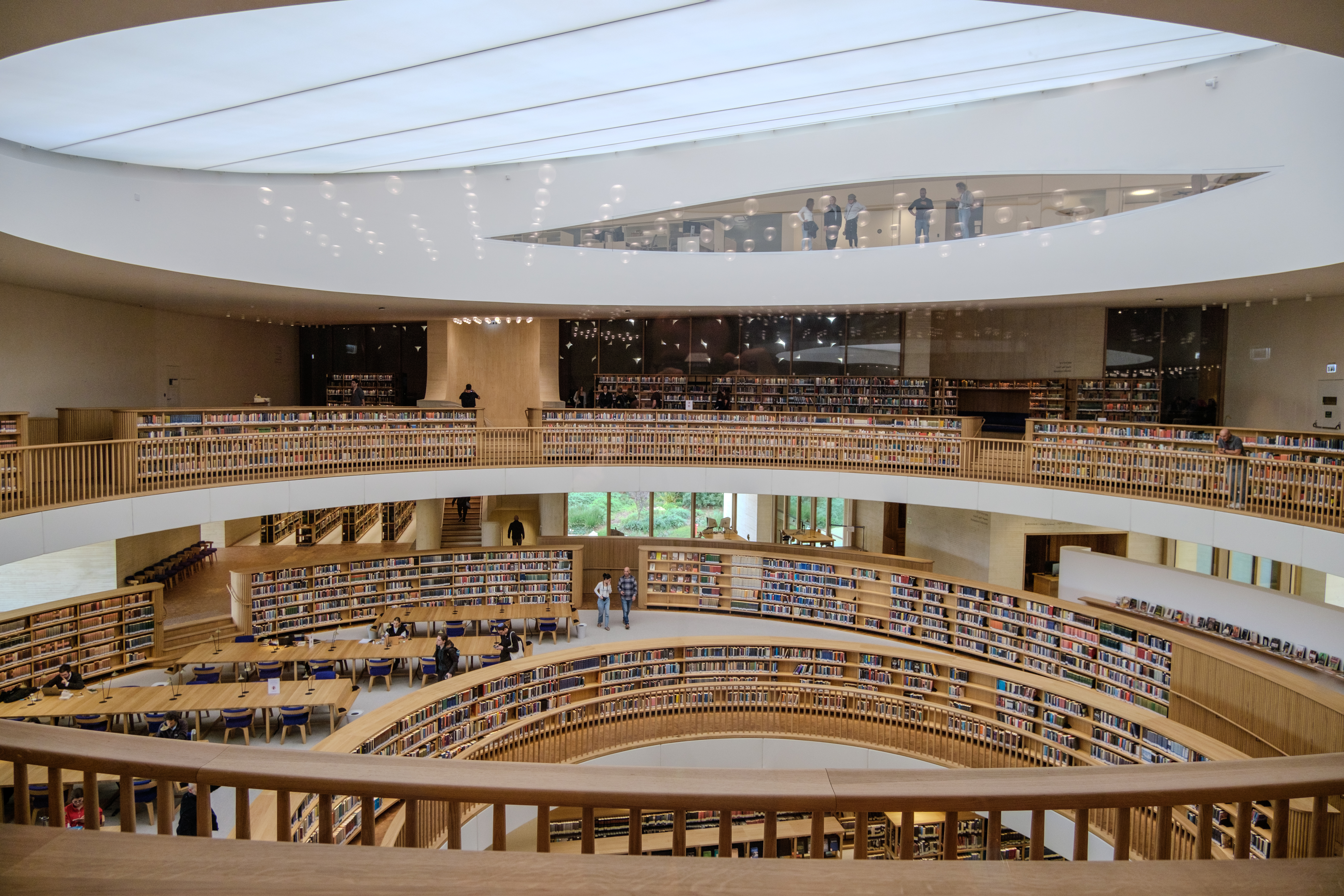
- The reading room (2023)
- 31°46′38″N 35°12′12″E
- Location: Jerusalem, Israel
- Established: 1892; 134 years ago
- Reference to legal mandate: The Legal Deposit of generally available documents

Collection
- Items collected: Unique collections of manuscripts, special collections of books, music, radio and television programmes, film, theatre, maps, posters, photographs, electronic documents and newspapers.
- Size: 5 million volumes

Other information
- Budget: Approximately 100 million NIS
- Director: Oren Weinberg
- Employees: 367
- Website: nli.org.il

The National Library of Israel (NLI; Hebrew: הספרייה הלאומית, romanized: HaSifria HaLeumit; Arabic: المكتبة الوطنية في إسرائيل), formerly Jewish National and University Library (JNUL; Hebrew: בית הספרים הלאומי והאוניברסיטאי, romanized: Beit Ha-Sfarim Ha-Le'umi ve-Ha-Universita'i), is the library dedicated to collecting the cultural treasures of Israel and of Jewish heritage. The library holds more than 5 million books, and is located in the Government complex (Kiryat HaMemshala) near the Knesset.

The National Library owns the world's largest collections of Hebraica and Judaica, and is the repository of many rare and unique manuscripts, books and artifacts.

== History ==
=== B'nai Brith library (1892–1925) ===
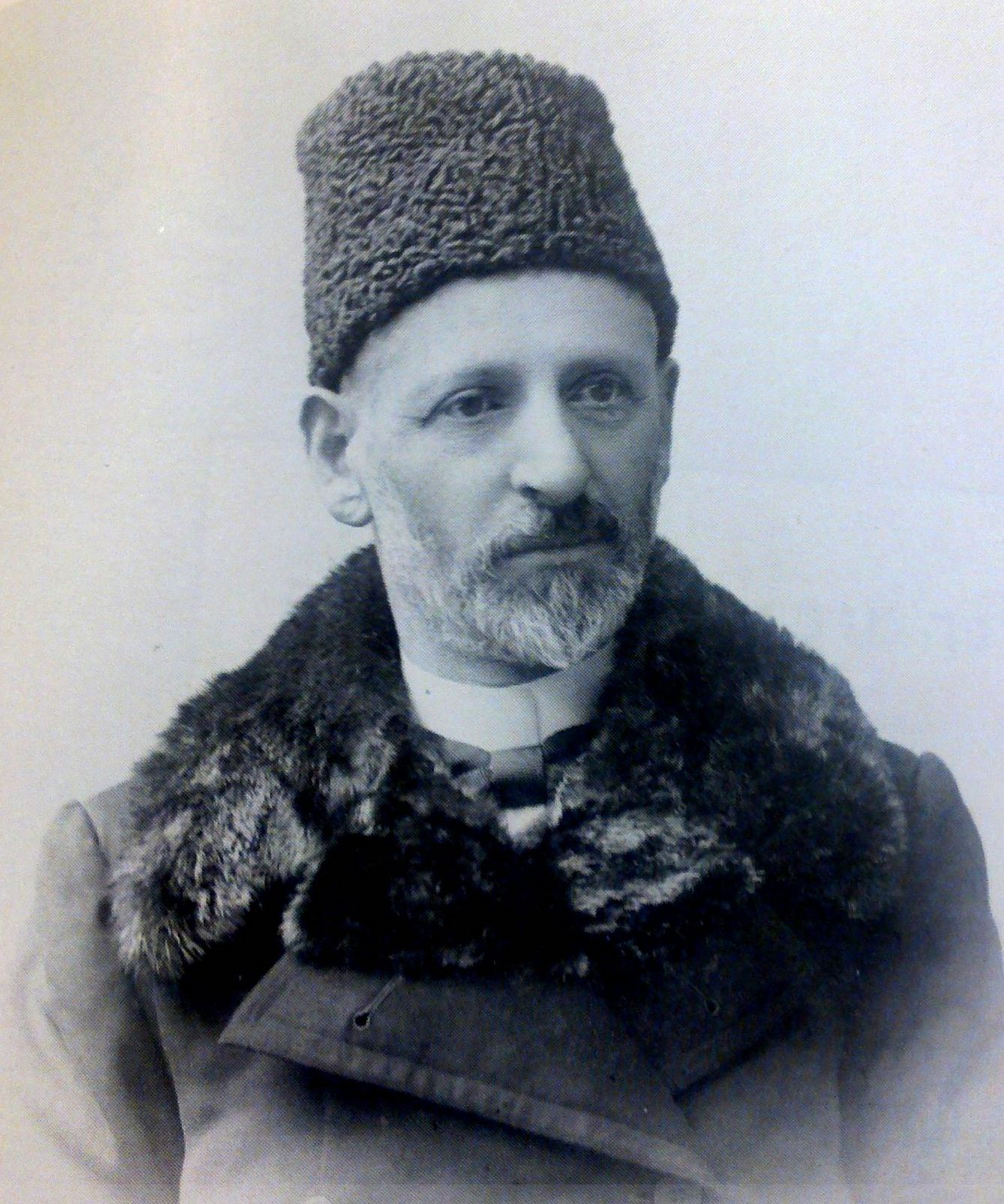
Joseph Chazanovitz

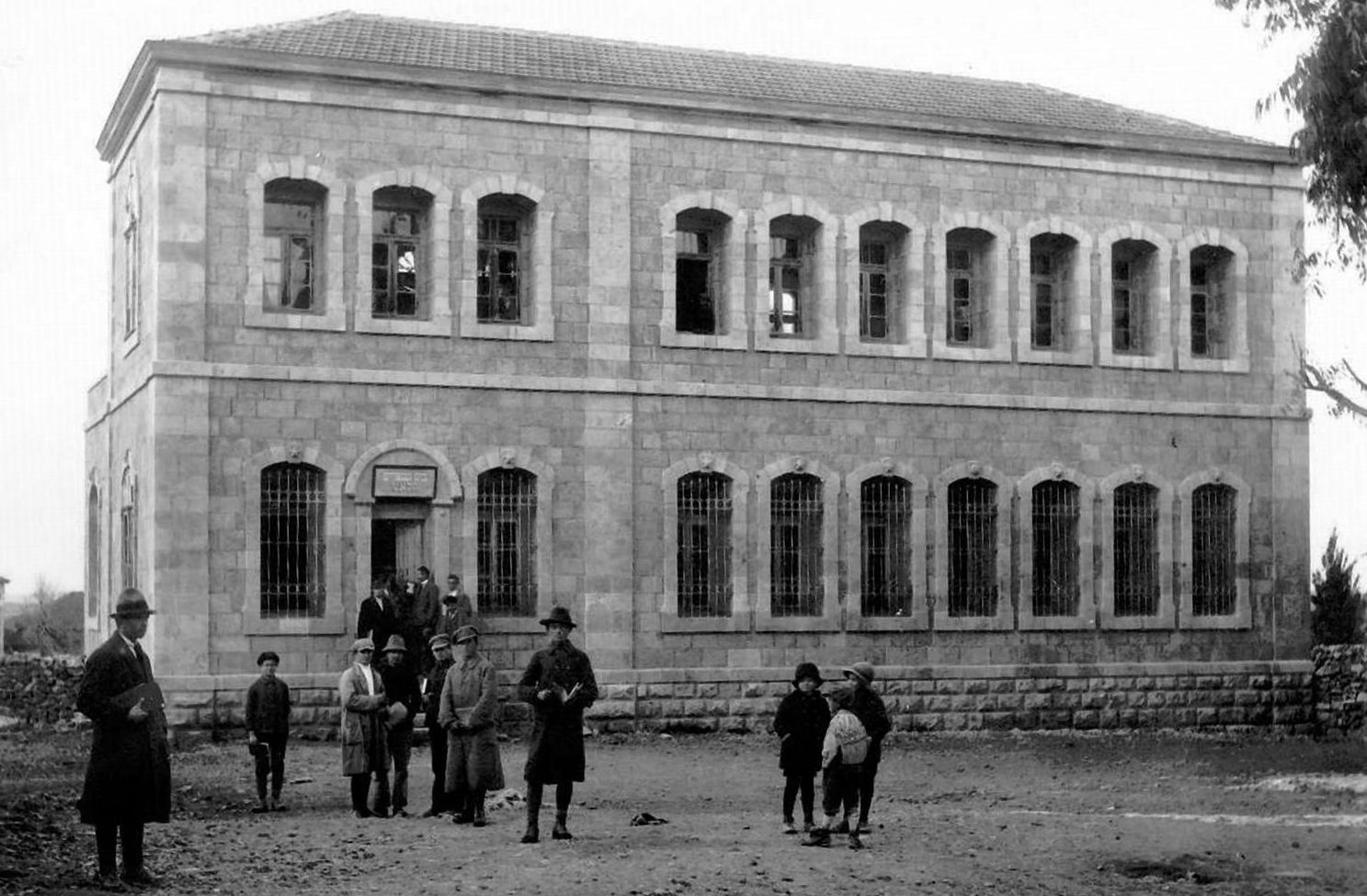
B'nai Brith library, Jerusalem

The establishment of a Jewish National Library in Jerusalem was the brainchild of Joseph Chazanovitz (1844–1919). His idea was creating a "home for all works in all languages and literatures which have Jewish authors, even though they create in foreign cultures." Chazanovitz (variously spelled Chasanowitz in German, Chazanowicz in Polish, etc.), a subject of the Russian Czar, collected some 15,000 volumes which later became the core of the library.

The B'nai Brith library, founded in Jerusalem in 1892, was the first public library in the region of Palestine to serve the Jewish community. The library was located on B'nai Brith Street, between the Meah Shearim neighborhood and the Russian Compound. Ten years later, the Bet Midrash Abrabanel library, as it was then known, moved to Ethiopia Street.

=== Hebrew University library (1925–2007) ===
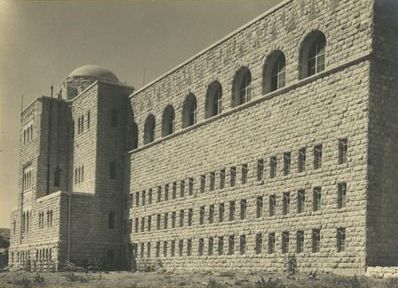
Hebrew university library on Mount Scopus (1925–1937)

In 1920, when plans were drawn up for the Hebrew University of Jerusalem, the B'nai Brith collection became the basis for a university library. The books were moved to Mount Scopus when the university opened five years later.

In 1948, when access to the university campus on Mount Scopus was blocked, most of the books were moved to the university's temporary quarters in the Terra Sancta building in Rehavia. By that time, the university collection included over one million books. For lack of space, some of the books were placed in storerooms around the city. In 1960, they were moved to the new JNUL building in Givat Ram.

In the late 1970s, when the new university complex on Mount Scopus was inaugurated and the faculties of Law, Humanities and Social Science returned there, departmental libraries opened on that campus and the number of visitors to the Givat Ram library dropped. In the 1990s, the building suffered from maintenance problems such as rainwater leaks and insect infestation.

=== National Library legal status (2007) ===
In 2007 the library was officially recognized as The National Library of the State of Israel after the passage of the National Library Law. The law, which came into effect on 23 July 2008, changed the library's name to "National Library of Israel" and turned it temporarily to a subsidiary company of the University, later to become a fully independent community interest company, jointly owned by the Government of Israel (50%), the Hebrew University (25%) and other organizations.

=== New building ===
In 2014, the project for a new home of the Library in Jerusalem was unveiled. The 45,000 square meters building was designed by the Basel-based architecture firm Herzog & de Meuron. The cornerstone laying ceremony took place in 2016. The completion date was postponed a number of times and the old library building at Givat Ram continued to be used till September 2023. The grand opening events planned for the week of 22 October were cancelled due to the October 7 attacks and the ensuing Gaza war. As a result, the new building opened its doors to the public on 29 October 2023, with service and capacity being subject to war-related limitations.

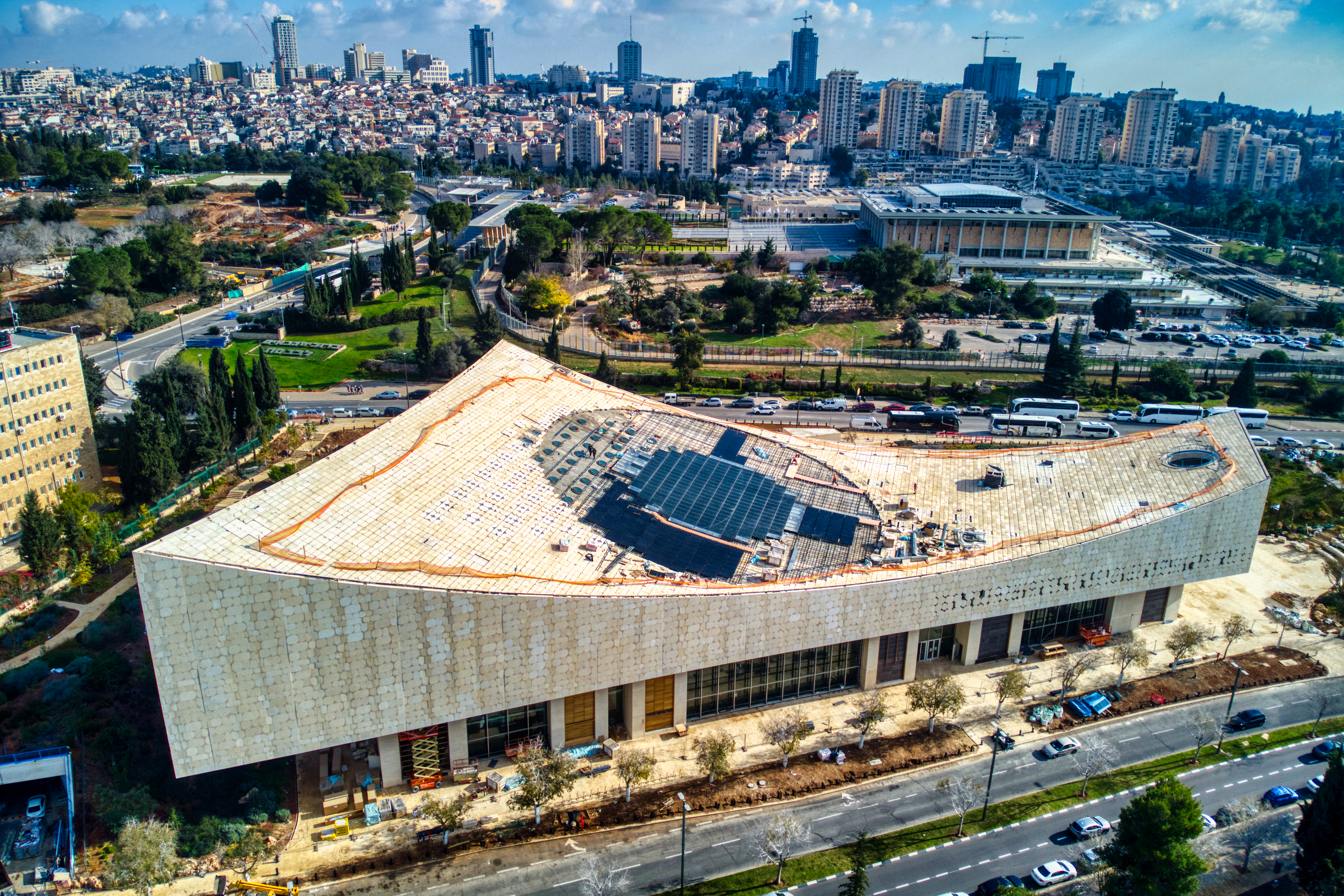
The new building by Herzog & de Meuron (2023)

=== Temporary closure (2020) ===
In August 2020, the National Library announced its immediately forthcoming closure "until further notice" due to the ongoing financial and government crisis (see COVID-19 pandemic in Israel). The closure lasted for a number of weeks. A small skeleton staff continued coming to work, but most of the employees either worked from home or took partial or full paid leave. During this period, the library, mainly the reference, education and culture departments, provided online services.

== Goals and objectives ==
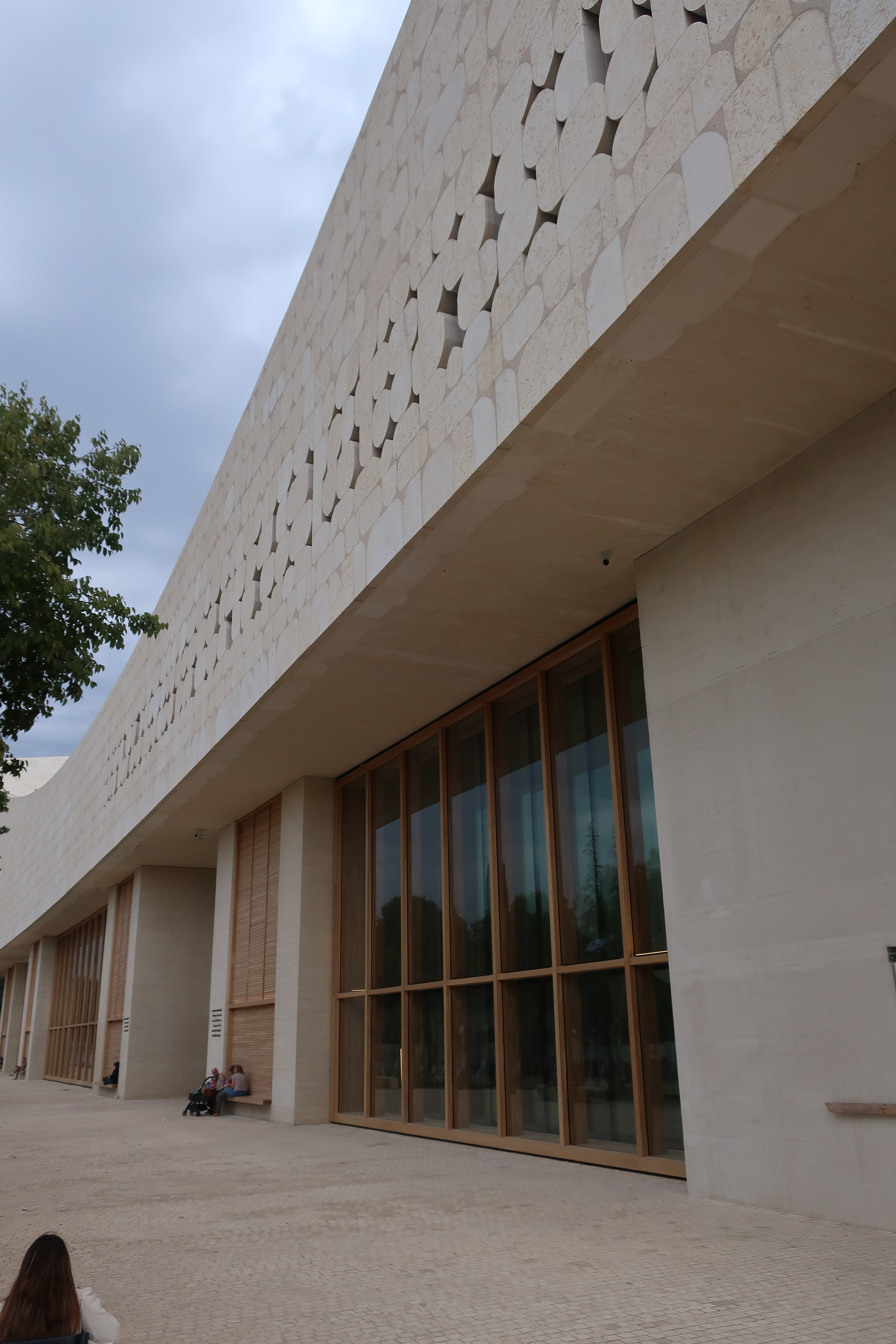
The National Library of Israel (2023)

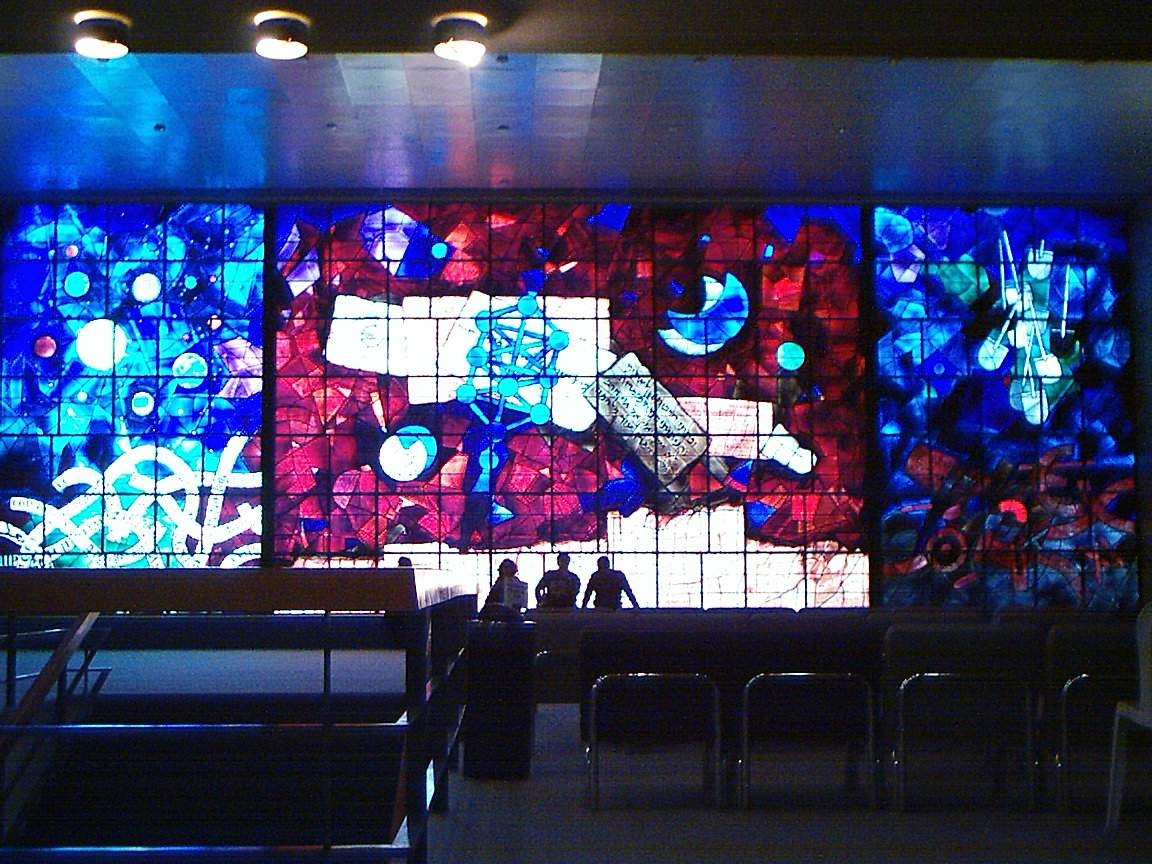
Ardon windows in the old library building, Givat Ram

=== Mission ===
The library's mission is to secure copies of all material published in Israel, in any language; all publications on the subject of the State of Israel, the Land of Israel, Judaism and the Jewish people, published in any language, in any country in the world; and all material published in Hebrew or any of the languages spoken in the Jewish Diaspora (such as Yiddish and Ladino).

By law, two copies of all printed matter published in Israel must be deposited in the National Library. In 2001, the law was amended to include audio and video recordings, and other non-print media.

=== Scanning and online access ===
Many manuscripts, including some of the library's unique volumes such the thirteenth-century Worms Mahzor, have been scanned and are available on the library's website.

==== Books from the Islamic world ====
Due to be completed in 2023, the National Library of Israel is digitizing over 2,500 rare manuscripts and books which will be available online for free. The works are written in Arabic, Persian, Turkish and Urdu and date from the ninth to twentieth centuries.

== Special collections ==
Among the library's special collections are the personal papers of hundreds of outstanding Jewish figures, and various collections from institutions and private archives as well as numerous other collections of Hebraica and Judaica.

=== Institutional, community, and topical collections ===
- the National Sound Archives
- Eran Laor Cartographic Collection
- The Sidney Edelstein Collection (for the history of science)
- the Genealogical History of the Irish Jewish Communities (GHIJC): on 19 December 2022, Irishman Stuart Rosenblatt, President of the Genealogical Society of Ireland, donated to the NIL his 22 volume collection, being the GHIJC, in the presence of the Irish Ambassador to Israel.

=== Personal papers, private research archives & libraries ===
- Isaac Newton: the library possesses some of his manuscripts dealing with theological subjects. The collection, donated by the family of the collector Abraham Yahuda, includes many works by Newton about mysticism, analyses of holy books, predictions about the end of days and the appearance of the ancient Temple in Jerusalem. It also contains maps that Newton sketched about mythical events to assist him in his end of days calculations.
- Martin Buber, the personal archives
- Gershom Scholem:
  - the personal archives
  - The Gershom Scholem Collection for the Research of Kabbalah and Hasidism, including Scholem's personal library and items added since his death in 1982.
- Max Brod: NIL completed its collection of the Max Brod archive in August 2019. The Israel Supreme Court, in a highly controversial decision, ordered the papers including the Franz Kafka papers to be deposited there, although Max Brod had expressly left the ultimate decision to the daughters of his secretary and heir Ester Hoffe, providing that they were to hand them over to the "Bibliothek der Hebräischen Universität Jerusalem oder der Städtischen Bibliothek Tel Aviv oder einem anderen öffentlichen Archiv im Inland oder Ausland", lit. 'library of the Hebrew University in Jerusalem, or the City Library Tel Aviv, or another domestic or foreign public archive'.

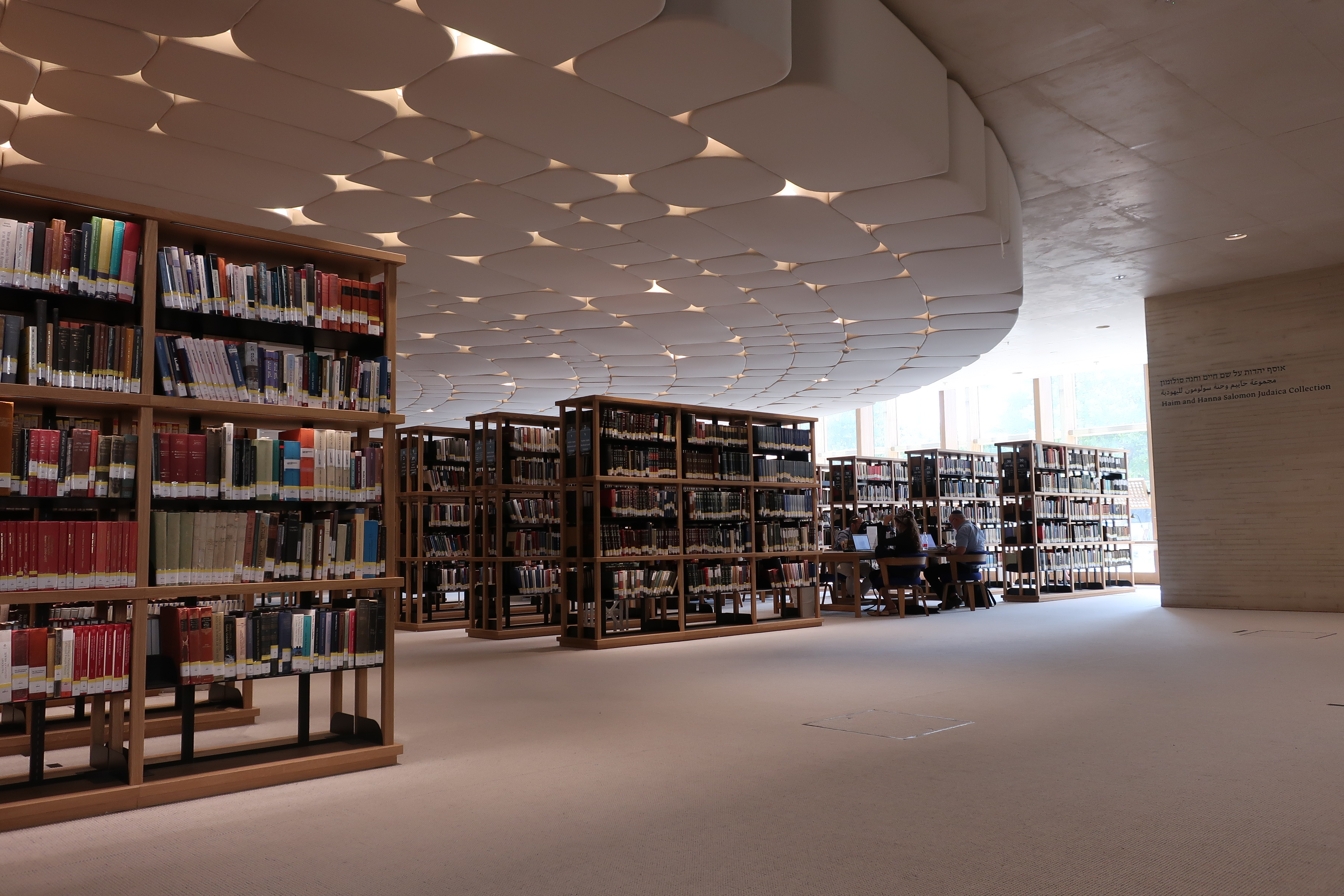
Reading room at the new National Library of Israel

=== Books from private libraries of Arab Palestinians who fled in 1948 ===
Following the occupation of Arab and mixed neighbourhoods of West Jerusalem by Haganah forces in May 1948, the libraries of a number of Palestinian Arabs who fled the country as well as of other well-to-do Palestinians were transferred to the National Library. These collections included those of Henry Cattan, Khalil Beidas, Khalil al-Sakakini and Aref Hikmet Nashashibi. About 30,000 books were removed from homes in West Jerusalem, with another 40,000 taken from other cities in Mandatory Palestine. It is unclear whether the books were being kept and protected or if they were looted from the abandoned houses of their owners. Between May 1948 and February 1949, approximately 24,000 books and manuscripts were discarded as "irrelevant or hostile material." About 6,000 of these books are in the library today indexed with the label AP – "Abandoned Property". The books are cataloged without information on provenance or former ownership, can be viewed from the Library's general catalog and are regularly consulted by the public.

== See also ==
- Judaica Archival Project
- List of national and state libraries
- Union List of Israel, combined library catalog with over 5 million entries
