= Gazoz (band) =

Israeli pop rock band

Gazoz גזוז
- Origin: Tel Aviv, Israel
- Genres: Pop rock
- Years active: 1978–1979
- Labels: Hed Arzi Music
- Spinoffs: Doda
- Spinoff of: Kaveret
- Members: Danny Sanderson; Gidi Gov; Mazi Cohen; Moti Dichne; Danny Par; Meir Speiser; Gary Resnik; Ziv Ben; Shlomo Hammi

Gazoz (Hebrew: גזוז, lit. 'Soda') was an Israeli pop rock band established in 1978 and disbanded in 1979.

Two members of Gazoz, Gidi Gov and Danny Sanderson, played together in Kaveret before joining Gazoz. Most of its songs were radio hits, including “Rony”, “Danny And Mummy”, “Spaceship”, “Tea Makes Me Dizzy” and “Nine O'Clock At The Roundabout.”

== History ==
=== Background ===
The band was founded by Danny Sanderson and Avraham Deshe (Pashnel). Unlike Kaveret, Gazoz was a business partnership between Sanderson and Pashnel only, and all other band members were employed as salaried employes. The lineup included Mazi Cohen and ex-Kavaret member Gidi Gov as singers, Moti Dichna as bassist and singer, Danny Par as pianist, Meir Shpitzer, Gerry Reznik, and Ziv Ben as wind instrument players, and Shlomo Hamami as drummer. Sanderson himself, who wrote, composed, and arranged all the band's songs, served as the singer and guitarist. Initially, Sanderson intended to add singer Josie Katz, who was at the peak of her success at the time, as the female member of the band, but Katz declined due to personal circumstances. Sanderson also offered Yehudit Ravitz to join, but she refused because she wanted to sing her own material, which Sanderson was not interested in including.

Musically, Gazoz presented a line of soft and friendly rock, influenced by 1970s American rock and roll, wrapped in rich arrangements (vocals and a brass section) with singing duties shared.

=== "Gazoz" and "Second Coming" ===
The band launched their songs in music videos that were broadcast on the Channel 1 program Another Hit. The band's first album, "Gazoz," contained the hits: "Nine O'Clock At The Roundabout," "She Won't Know," "Danny And Mummy," and "Govina." The album sold 70,000 copies. The band managed to release another album called "Second Coming" in 1979 before Sanderson decided to disband it that same year.

=== After disbandment ===
The collaboration between Sanderson and Gov renewed a year later, in the band Doda.

In 1990, the album "20 Hits" was released − the only collection of the band's songs, which included all the songs from the first album "Gazoz" as well as nine out of the 13 songs from the second album "Second Coming" (including a re-recording of the song "She Sat Down by the Piano" from "Second Coming"). In 2002, a second edition of this compilation album was released, which included 6 additional songs by the band (3 of which were from "Second Coming" and had not been released on the previous edition of the compilation).

The band reunited twice: in Arad in 1993, with a partial lineup but with Efraim Shamir as a special guest, and in 1996 on Sanderson's show on Channel 1 (with an almost complete lineup, missing only Danny Par, and with the addition of Roy Zohar and Nitzan Ein Habar, who were Sanderson's musicians at the time). In 2014, Sanderson, Gov, and Cohen appeared in the show "Danny, Gidi and Friends," where they sang many of the band's hits.

=== Tributes ===
In 2009, to mark the thirtieth anniversary of the band's breakup, comedians Guri Alfi, Roy Bar-Natan, and Tali Oren staged a tribute show to the band, featuring performances of many of their hits. Due to the success of the show, the three went on another tour in the summer of 2011, under the name "In Honor of Summer" (named after one of the band's hits), and even produced a music video as a tribute to the cover of their first album. In some of the performances, Danny Sanderson himself also participated as a guest singer, and the tour as a whole was a success.

== Members ==
- Danny Sanderson - guitars, vocals
- Gidi Gov - vocals
- Mazi Cohen - vocals
- Moti Dichne - bass guitar, vocals
- Danny Par - piano
- Meir Speiser - wind instruments
- Gary Resnik - wind instruments
- Ziv Ben - wind instruments
- Shlomo Hemmi - drums

== Discography ==
- 1979: Gazoz (גזוז) and Second Coming (גלגול שני)
- 1990: 20 Hits (20 הלהיטים)
