= Yisrael Aharoni =

Israeli celebrity chef

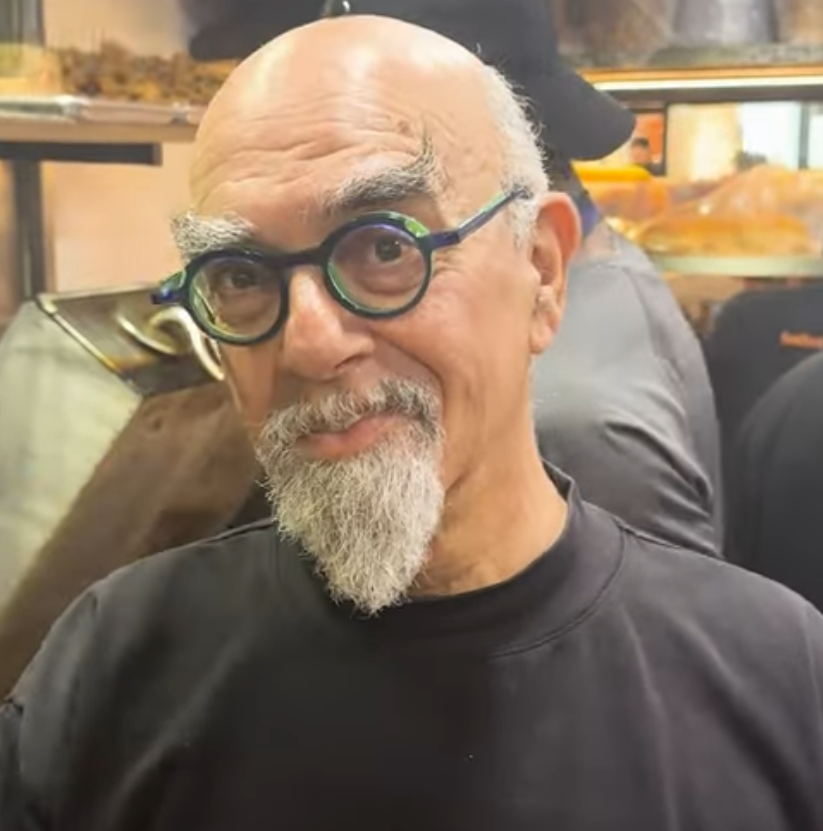
- Born: July 3, 1950 (age 75); Haifa, Israel
- Culinary career
- Cooking style: Chinese Cuisine, French Cuisine, Vietnamese cuisine
- Current restaurants: Yin Yang; Pet Kwa Restaurants that have closed: Tapuach Zahav (Golden Apple); Tapuach Bagan (Apple in the Garden); Shaolin; Tai-Chi
- Television shows: Through the Food (Heb: דרך האוכל); Private Lesson (Heb: שיעור פרטי); Yisrael Aharoni Cooks for Friends (Heb: ישראל אהרוני מבשל לחברים)

Yisrael Aharoni (Hebrew: ישראל אהרוני; born July 3, 1950) is an Israeli celebrity chef.

== Biography ==
Aharoni was born in Haifa, Israel, to Bukharian Jewish parents. Aharoni served as a combat soldier in the Golani Brigade of the Israel Defense Forces. He saw action in the War of Attrition. Following his discharge, he moved to the Netherlands to study art in Amsterdam, where he discovered Chinese cuisine. Upon his return to Israel, he lived in kibbutz Hulata and worked as a counselor for at-risk youth for two and a half years. He then left Israel to study cooking abroad, where he studied Chinese cuisine in Taiwan before apprenticing at upscale restaurants in France.

== Culinary career ==
In 1981, after he returned to Israel, Aharoni opened his first restaurant, "Yin-Yang," a Chinese restaurant on Rothschild Boulevard, and it became a success. Later, he opened another restaurant in Tel Aviv, "Tai-Chi" in Gan HaIr. In the late 1990s, he opened "Tapuach Hazahav" (The Golden Apple), a French gourmet restaurant which closed after several years. He owned the "Pat-Qua" Chinese-Thai restaurant in Herzliya. He has participated in the preparation of gala meals with leading international chefs. In 2019, he opened a butcher shop on Tel Aviv's iconic Sheinkin Street with his son, Uri.

== Media career ==
He has hosted a number of television shows in Israel. He developed and hosted a 32-episode series on the foods of Israel's different ethnic groups. The show was purchased by the Italian Television Authority. A sequel series on different national cuisines was filmed abroad. He also hosted three seasons of a cooking show called "Private Lesson" and currently hosts "Aharoni Cooks for Friends".

Aharoni writes a culinary column for "Seven Days," the weekend magazine of the newspaper Yedioth Ahronoth. He has traveled extensively throughout the world covering different cuisines and food trends. As of May 2013, the Union List of Israel lists 32 Hebrew cookbooks which Aharoni has authored or coauthored, including several in separate kosher and non-kosher editions. This includes 19 cookbooks he authored on his own, all bestsellers in Israel. In 1999, he coauthored "Eating Alfresco: The Best Street Food in the World." In 2012 Aharoni began working on a book about the foods of the Silk Road.

Aharoni is a judge on MasterChef Israel and has worked as a guest disc jockey at Tel Aviv nightclubs.
