= Union List of Israel =

Online Bibliography Records

The Union List of Israel (ULI), or Israel Union Catalog, is a public online union catalog in Israel containing over eight million bibliographic records based on the catalogs of the major research libraries in Israel - including all university libraries, most colleges, and several additional research libraries. The participating institutions include libraries of Israeli universities and colleges as well as the National Library of Israel and several major libraries. Searching the Primo interface of ULI allows users to access the local catalogs of the institutions where an item is held, to verify its exact location and availability. The processes of ingesting, processing and unifying local library catalogs are managed by the National Library of Israel.

ULI contains records representing all types of library materials (books, journals, maps, audiovisual materials, digital publications, etc.), except for articles and reprints. Searches can be conducted across the entire database and filtered by various facets.

The database was established in 1997, and was initially operated by Malmad ("Center for Digital Information Services"), a subunit of Machba ("Inter-University Computation Center"). In early 2015, responsibility for the catalog transferred to the National Library of Israel.

== History ==
The union catalog is based on centralized computerized cataloging of bibliographic records contributed by participating libraries, without manual intervention. The database does not record individual library holdings but rather links to the relevant record in each library's catalog, where details of availability can be viewed.

== Use ==
The main advantage of ULI for the general public is that it provides convenient centralized access to the holdings of all member libraries, eliminating the need to search each library's catalog separately. For participating libraries (and others), the database facilitates cooperative cataloging: a source for copying high-quality catalog records into local catalogs, reducing local cataloging workload; a basis for quality control and developing national cataloging policy; and a resource for collaborative work on the national authority file.

== Technical aspects ==
Until 2023, the database ran on various versions of Ex Libris' Aleph software, migrating in 2023 to Ex Libris' Alma system. ULI's public search interface is now Primo from Ex Libris.
