= Menachem Zilberman =

Israeli actor and comedian (1946–2014)

- מנחם זילברמן
- Born: 6 October 1946; Eilat, Mandatory Palestine
- Died: 13 January 2014 (aged 67); Los Angeles, California, U.S.
- Occupations: Actor; comedian; songwriter
- Years active: 1965–2014
- Spouse: Dorit Zilberman (separated)
- Children: 3

Menachem Zilberman (Hebrew: מנחם זילברמן; 6 October 1946 – 13 January 2014) was an Israeli actor, comedian and songwriter.

== Biography ==
Zilberman grew up in Eilat. He served in the IDF in the 1965 class of the Nahal troupe, together with Shalom Hanoch, Sasi Keshet, Tuvia Tzafir, Shula Chen and others.

After his discharge he studied acting at "Beit Zvi," and then began a career as a singer and actor.

In 1969 he participated in the show "Tzatz Vetzatza," an evening of Nathan Alterman songs together with Rivka Zohar, Talia Shapira, Ezra Dagan and Bomba Tzur, produced by Avraham Desha (Fashanel).

In 1970 he participated in the musical "City of Men" based on stories by Damon Runyon that were written by Eliezer Carmi and Dan Almagor, produced by Danny Dagan and starring Sasi Keshet and Dori Ben-Ze'ev, in which Zilberman played the narrator.

In 1971 Zilberman played the lead role in the first Israeli TV series "Hedva and Shlomik," where he played Shlomik, a kibbutznik who meets Hedva, an urban-bourgeois from Herzliya Pituah (played by Yael Aviv) and they leave the kibbutz and try their luck in the big city. The series gained great popularity and served as the basis for a film. Despite Zilberman becoming a familiar figure in Israel, his participation in the series made it difficult for him to find other roles, both in film and theater.

Zilberman was one of the founders of the Kaveret band. In 1976 he played in the cult film "Givat Halfon Eina Ona" as the soldier Wasserman.

In the second half of the 1970s Zilberman worked in advertising and alongside Alex Ansky was the copywriter in the Likud party and Menachem Begin's 1977 election campaign.

Menachem Zilberman died from a heart attack on 13 January 2014, aged 67, in Los Angeles, California in the United States, where he had lived since 2000. He was survived by his three children.
