= Danny Sanderson =

Israeli musical artist

Danny Sanderson דני סנדרסון
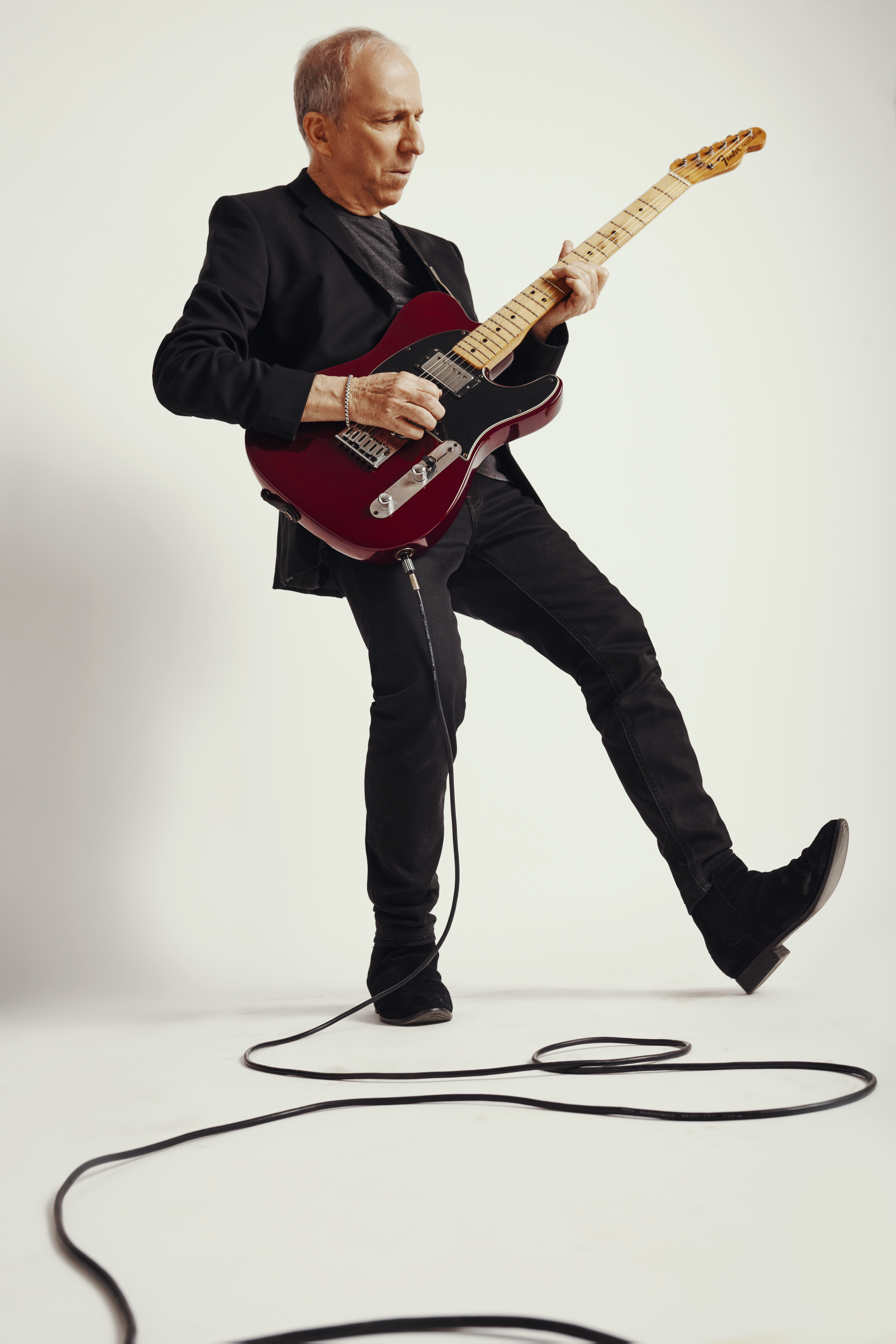

Background information
- Born: November 30, 1950 (age 75); Kfar Blum, Israel
- Origin: Haifa, Israel
- Genres: Pop rock, hard rock, Israeli pop, Israeli rock
- Occupations: Musician, singer-songwriter, guitarist
- Instruments: Vocals, guitar
- Years active: 1966–present
- Labels: NMC Music, Hed Arzi
- Formerly of: The Nahal Band, Kaveret, Gazoz, Doda

Danny Sanderson (Hebrew: דני סנדרסון; born November 30, 1950) is an Israeli musician, singer-songwriter and guitarist. In 2005, Sanderson received a lifetime achievement award for his contribution to Israeli music.

== Biography ==
Sanderson was born in Kibbutz Kfar Blum, Israel. His parents were American Jewish immigrants. During his childhood, the family eventually moved to Haifa. His father worked as the director of El Al's North America department located in New York City, where the family relocated to in 1960.

While in New York, Sanderson attended the High School of Music and Art, in Manhattan. In 1965, at the age of 15, he started his first band. During that time, he wrote his first song. In 1968, Sanderson returned to Israel and was drafted into the Israel Defense Forces, serving in a military band.

== Music career ==
In 1971, after his release from the Israel Defense Forces, Sanderson played with the Schnitzelim Band. He recorded "The Left-handed Octopus" with Egyptian-born musician Zouzou Moussa and the orchestra of Israel Radio Arabic.

After a short period in London, Sanderson returned to Israel and founded a new band, Kaveret, with Alon Oleartchik, Ephraim Shamir, Gidi Gov, Meir Fenigstein and, later on, Yoni Rechter and Yitzhak Klepter. The band broke up in 1976, and is widely regarded as one of the pioneering bands of Israeli rock. Sanderson was its main songwriter.

Sanderson took a break from music to write a nonsense book (Nekhira Pumbit, נחירה פומבית, A Public Snore), and musically produced a stand-up/music show for Yehonatan Geffen. He went on to create another band called Gazoz, which produced two albums, and Doda (דודה, Aunt), which had a heavier rock sound.

Sanderson rebounded with his first solo album and solo show, and went on to create two other albums and solo shows in 1984 and 1987. His next album, Kofetz Leshni'ya (קופץ לשנייה, Just popped in for a second), released in 1991, was a more mature and musically sophisticated achievement, but less commercially successful than his previous solo albums. The Israeli audience, enamored with Sanderson's blend of humor, jokes and lighthearted music, was willing to accept Sanderson's brilliant music only when masqueraded as 'simple pop', but was much less enthusiastic about more earnest musical attempts.

Sanderson produced two more albums in the 1990s, followed by an album of his songs sung by others (2001) and a melancholy album (2006) called Congo Blue (קונגו בלו), which coincided with the death of his wife, Neomi. Sanderson also released several compilation albums and participated in two albums commemorating reunion shows of Kaveret.

In 2007, famed Israeli punk rock singer and bassist Yotam Ben-Horin (of Useless ID) started touring with Sanderson as a touring bassist. He has since also become a session bassist for Sanderson and an official member of his solo band. In 2009, Ben-Horin sang on one of the new tracks on Sanderson's upcoming album Lo Yafrid Davar (לא יפריד דבר, "Nothing Will Separate [Us]"). In 2017 Sanderson released his new album Mikan Haderech (מכאן הדרך, From here the road).

== Discography ==
=== Studio albums ===
- Begodel Tiv'i (בגודל טבעי, In natural size) (1982)
- Haf Mi'pesha (חף מפשע, Not Guilty) (1984)
- Hacham al Ktanim (חכם על קטנים, Smart ass) (1987)
- Kofetz Leshni'ya (קופץ לשנייה, Just popped for a second) (1991)
- Met Livkot 2 (מת לבכות 2, Cry Hard 2) (1994)
- Ha'lo Noda (הלא נודע, The Unknown) (1997)
- Congo Blue (קונגו בלו, Congo Blue) (2005)
- Lo Yafrid Davar (לא יפריד דבר, Nothing Will Separate) (2009)
- Mikan Haderech (מכאן הדרך, From here the road) (2017)
- Gluim VeNistarim (גלויים ונסתרים, Revelations and Secrets) (2022)

=== Live albums ===
- Black&White (2004)

=== Compilation albums ===
- Ha'tovim le Tayis - Nivheret Shirim (הטובים לטייס – נבחרת שירים, The Best for flying) (1992)
- Ha'meitav (המיטב, The Best) (2006)

== Personal life ==
In April 1978, Sanderson married Naomi, who died in 2005. His children are director Adam and actress Dina, and he is the grandfather of three grandchildren. Since 2008 he has been the partner of actress Anat Atzmon. He lives in Tel Aviv.
