= Yitzhak Klepter =

Israeli singer, composer and guitarist (1950–2022)

Yitzhak Klepter יצחק קלפטר
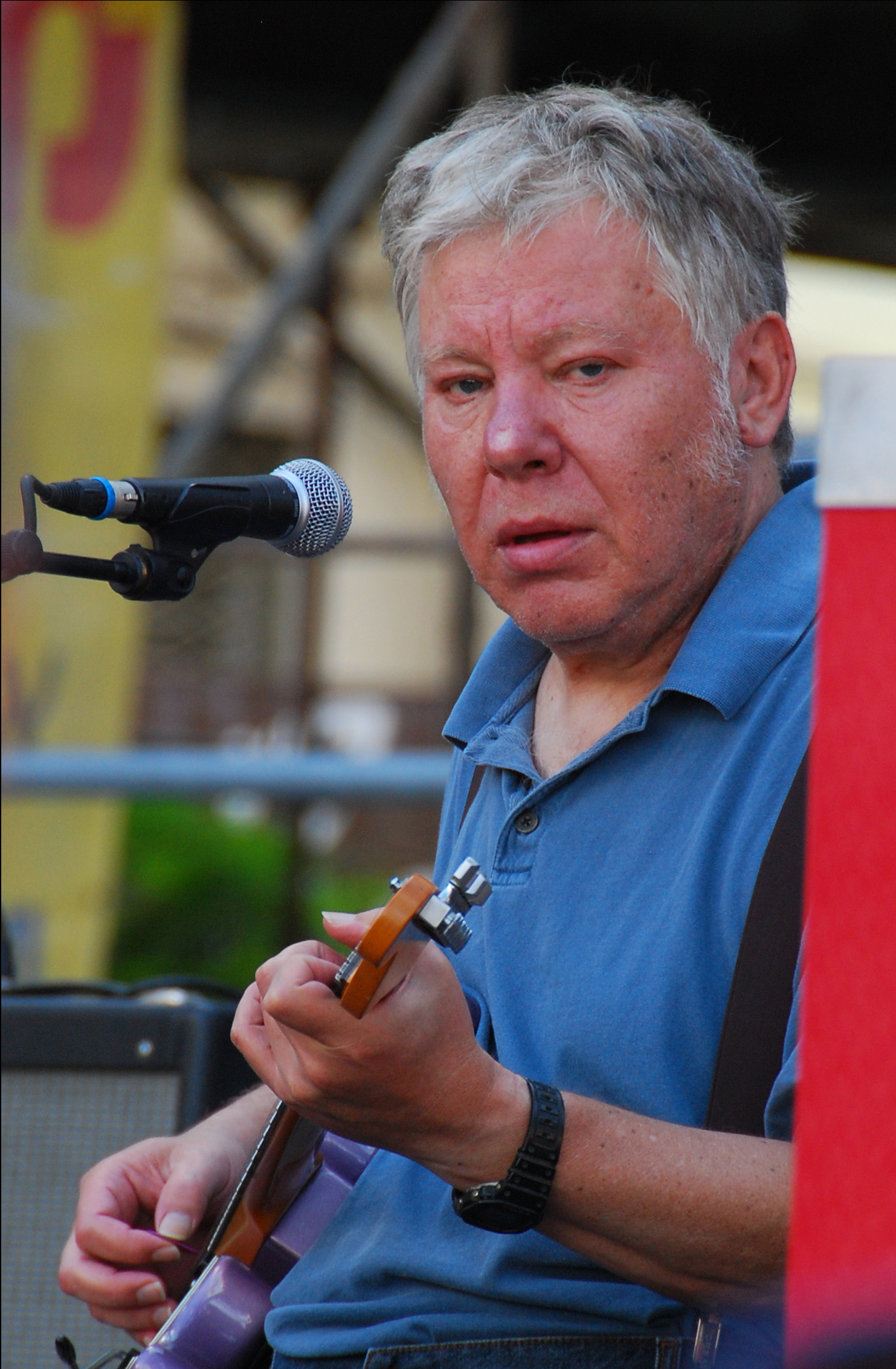
- Klepter in 2009

Background information
- Also known as: Churchill
- Born: 31 March 1950; Haifa, Israel
- Origin: Tel Aviv, Israel
- Died: 8 December 2022 (aged 72) Tel Aviv, Israel
- Genres: Psychedelic rock, hard rock, progressive rock
- Years active: 1965-2022
- Label: Hed Arzi Music
- Formerly of: The Churchills, Kaveret

Yitzhak Klepter (Hebrew: יצחק קלפטר; 31 March 1950 – 8 December 2022) was an Israeli singer, composer and guitarist. He was a pioneer of Israeli rock, and had several collaborations with Israeli artists such as Arik Einstein and Gidi Gov.

== Biography ==
Yitzhak Klepter was born in Haifa and grew up in Tel Aviv. In elementary school, he was asked to give a presentation about the life of Winston Churchill. This was the source of his nickname "Churchill." At the age of 15, he founded his first band, the Churchills who would later become the backing band of Arik Einstein. In the Israel Defense Forces, he served in the armored corps then switched to the armored corps band. In 1973, he joined Kaveret, often referred to as Israel’s equivalent to the Beatles.

Following the band’s breakup in 1976, Klepter alongside Shem Tov Levi formed Tuned Tone which would enjoy brief success and released one album in 1979.

In 1980, Klepter alongside Yigal Bashan and Hanan Yuval recorded the song titled "The Red Devils", which became an anthem for Hapoel Tel Aviv. Afterwards, Klepter began a solo career which included 2 collaborations with Arik Einstein ("Sittin' on the fence" and "Fragile") and collaborations with former Kaveret band members Gidi Gov and Danny Sanderson.

== See also ==
- Music of Israel
