= Kaveret =

Israeli band

Kaveret כוורת
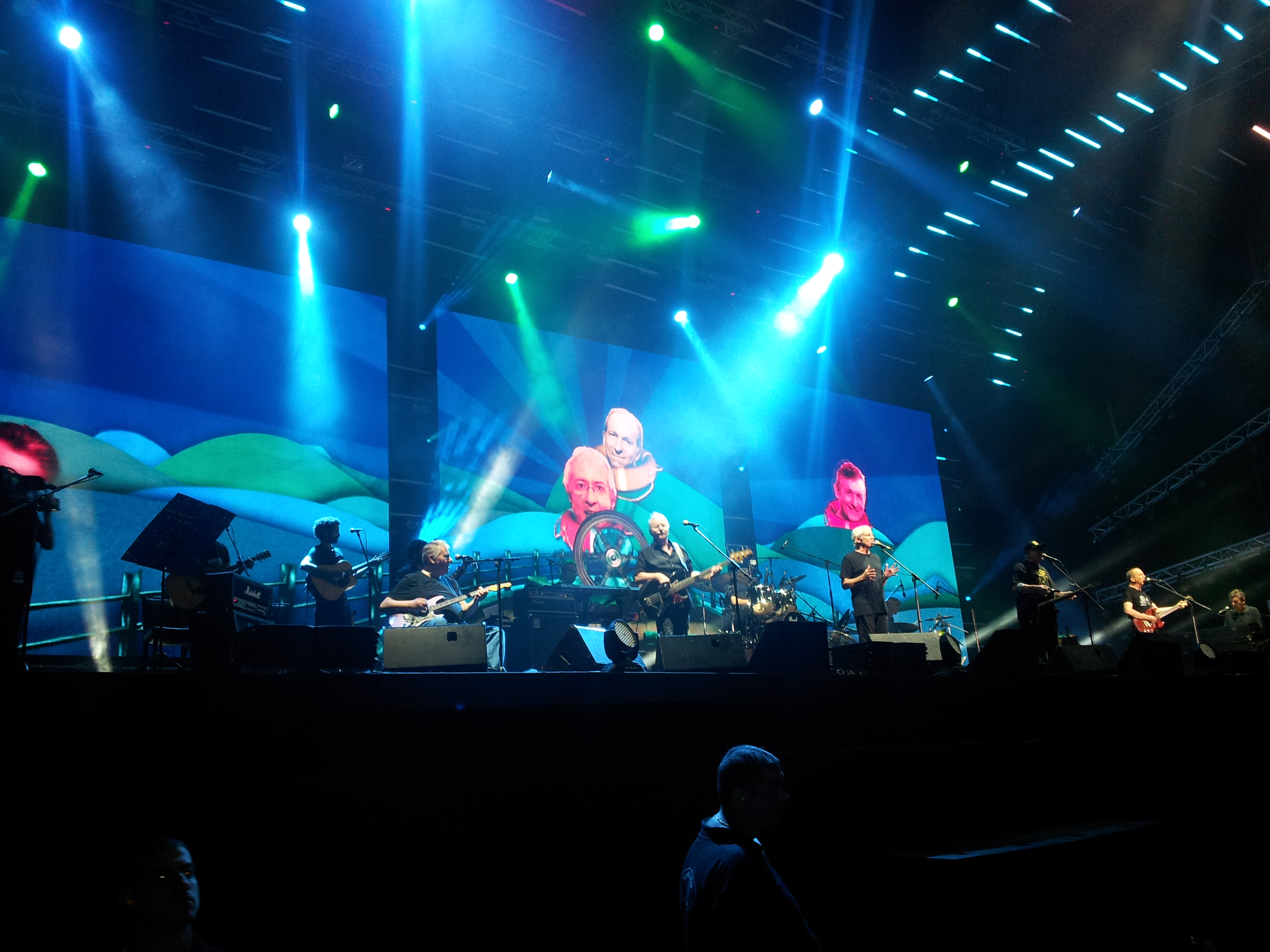
- Kaveret on stage on their final reunion performance in 2013.

Background information
- Also known as: Poogy
- Origin: Tel Aviv, Israel
- Genres: Israeli rock, Progressive rock
- Years active: 1973–1976 (reunions: 1984, 1990, 1998, 2013)
- Label: Hed Arzi Music
- Spinoffs: Gazoz
- Spinoff of: The Nahal Band
- Members: Danny Sanderson; Gidi Gov; Alon Oleartchik; Efraim Shamir; Meir Fenigstein; Yitzhak Klepter (deceased); Yoni Rechter

Kaveret (Hebrew: כוורת, lit. "beehive"), also known as Poogy (Hebrew: פוגי, nickname of band drummer Meir Fenigstein chosen for their performances abroad), was an Israeli pop rock band, which operated originally from 1973 to 1976. Representing Israel in the Eurovision Song Contest 1974, its songs featured humorous lyrics and ironic musical references. Kaveret is widely considered a breakthrough band in Israeli rock and pop history, and its members have had notable solo careers.

== History ==
=== Before Kaveret ===
Group members Danny Sanderson, Gidi Gov, Alon Oleartchik, Efraim Shamir and Meir Fenigstein met during their army service in the Nahal Entertainment Troupe (Hebrew: להקת הנח"ל, Lehakat HaNahal). Sanderson and Fenigstein joined the troupe in 1968, appearing in its 21st revue, the rest joining a year later. During their military service, Sanderson operated a civilian band called HaSchnizelim (Hebrew: השניצלים, lit. "the schnitzels"), with a flexible line-up, which at times included Gov, Olearchik, Shamir and Fenigstein, as well as other band members, such as Eli Magen and David Sha'anan. The same group of people also participated in taping humorous skits which were aired in Galei Tzahal show MiMeno Elayich (Hebrew: ממנו אלייך, lit. "From Him to You"), which were named "Pinot Poogy" (Hebrew: פינות פוגי, lit. "Poogy's Bits").

Such activity continued after all members left the army, evolving into writing and recording a full rock opera, called Sipurei Poogy (Hebrew: סיפורי פוגי, lit. "Poogy's Tales"), named after Fenigstein nickname, Poogy, as well as shorter musical skits, HaMelech Mambo (Hebrew: המלך ממבו, lit. "Mambo the King") and HaSipur HaMachrid Al HaYeled MiBrazil (Hebrew: הסיפור המחריד על הילד מברזיל, lit. "The Horrifying Story of the Kid from Brazil"). During work on these skits the line-up of the band formalized, with the addition of Yitzhak Klepter and Yoni Rechter to Sanderson, Gov, Oleartchik, Shamir and Fenigstein.

During this period future band members were involved in different projects. Shamir and Gov sang in the 1972 Israel Song Festival, Sanderson released a couple of songs in English, Like to Tag Along and Conspiracy, and Shamir and Oleartchik collaborated as a duo called Nu Az Ma (Hebrew: נו אז מה, lit. "Well, So What"), releasing two songs, "Dam Lo Tov" (Hebrew: דם לא טוב, lit. "No Good Blood") and "Sufa" (Hebrew: סופה, lit. "Storm"), while Klepter was a member of Aharit HaYamim (Hebrew: אחרית הימים, lit. "End of Days" or "Doomsday").

=== Years of activity ===
The band, now with a complete line-up, rehearsed the rock opera, with the intent of bringing it to the stage. The band was signed by producer Avraham Deshe (Pashanel), who convinced the band to give up the rock opera idea and put up a revue show composed of songs and skits. The updated show became a huge success. In November 1973, while the band itself was performing as part of their reserve army duty after the Yom Kippur War, the band's first album, Sipurei Poogy, was released, based upon the band's stage show. In the Israeli Annual Hebrew Song Chart, the band was voted "Band of the Year" in both Galei Tzahal and Israel Broadcasting Authority, a feat that they would repeat for the next four years. Their song, "HaMagafayim Shel Barukh" (Hebrew: המגפיים של ברוך, lit. "Barukh's Boots") won first place in both charts.

In March 1974, the band was selected to represent Israel in the Eurovision Song Contest 1974. In the contest, the band performed sixth with the song "Natati La Khayay", which received 11 points, achieving 7th place. Following their performance at Eurovision, the band released two songs in English, both are versions of the band's Hebrew songs with English lyrics, "She Looked Me in the Eye" (Natati La Khayay) and "Morris and His Turtle" (HaMagafayim Shel Barukh).

In August 1974, the band release its second album, "Poogy BePita" (Hebrew: פוגי בפיתה, lit. "Poogy in a Pita"), which included "Natati La Khayay", and continued touring with their "Sipurei Poogy" revue until the end of the year.

In early 1975, the band started working on new songs, which resulted in a new show and an album, "Tzafuf BaOzen" (Hebrew: צפוף באוזן, lit. "Crowded in the Ear"). The band's new revue received lukewarm responses, and the revue was revamped to contain more of its older material to please the crowd.

In early 1976 the band embarked on a U.S. tour, for which the band translated some of its repertoire to English, and recorded new songs in English. However, the band couldn't get a record deal, and returned to Israel in June 1976 and resumed touring. Soon, tensions within the band caused its members to announce the band's break up.

=== Solo careers and reunions ===
After the break up, Oleartchik and Fenigstein preferred moving to the U.S. while most of the group members embarked on solo careers, often collaborating with each other on the solo projects. In 1979 Sanderson and Gov formed a new band, Gazoz, which was more pop-oriented and released two albums, and a year later formed a third band, Doda, which had a rockier sound and managed to release a single album before breaking up.

In 1984 an initiative to reunite the band members for a short tour was successful, including the return of Oleartchik, who studied music and played in local bands, and Fenigstein, who quit music altogether and founded the Israel Film Festival, from the U.S.. The band played several shows, culminating in a free show in Yarkon Park, which was attended by a crowd of 400,000 to 500,000 people. To celebrate the reunion the band recorded a new song, "Meir VeAlon" (Hebrew: מאיר ואלון, lit. "Meir and Alon"), which chronicled Oleartchik and Fenigstein's stay in the U.S. The song was released in Oleartchik's first solo album, "Oleartchik", which was released the following year. A taping of the band's performance in Caesarea was released as a double album.

The band reunited again in 1990 to a tour titled "Kaveret Hozeret" (Hebrew: כוורת חוזרת, lit. "Kaveret Returns"), which was accompanied by a song by the same title, and by a reissue of the band's three original albums along with bonus tracks taken from rehearsals and pre-Kaveret skits. The tour was documented by Menachem Zilberman for a film called "Kaveret: Tmunot MeChayey Lehaka" (Hebrew: כוורת: תמונות מחיי להקה, lit. "Kaveret: Pictures from a Band's Life").

In 1998 the band reunited once more to perform one show in Yarkon Park, as part of Israel's 50th anniversary celebrations. The show was taped and released on the album "Kaveret BaPark" (Hebrew: כוורת בפארק, lit. "Kaveret in the Park"), which also included a bonus disc of rehearsals and two new songs written for the reunion, "Zocher, Lo Zocher" (Hebrew: זוכר, לא זוכר, lit. "Remember, Don't Remember") and "Mechapes Derech Chazara" (Hebrew: מחפש דרך חזרה, lit. "Looking for a Way Back"). The entire ensemble performed a single show in 2000; the band did not originally intend to reunite in that year, but did so especially for raising money to fund lifesaving surgery required by band member Yitzhak Klepter.

In March 2013 the band formally announced a further series of reunion concerts. Initially there were meant to be two concerts, but due to public demand, three additional shows were added. Prior to the shows a box set of rarities and outtakes titled "Kaveret BeKufsa – Antologia 1971–1976" (Hebrew: כוורת בקופסה – אנתולוגיה 1971–1976, lit. "Kaveret in a Box – Anthology 1971–1976") was released. The last performance, performed on 9 August 2013, was taped and released as an audio album and a DVD, titled "HaMofa HaAcharon" (Hebrew: המופע האחרון, lit. "The Final Act").

On 8 December 2022, Yitzhak Klepter died at the age of 72.

== Band members ==
- Danny Sanderson - vocals, electric guitar, acoustic guitar
- Gidi Gov - lead vocals, percussion
- Efraim Shamir - lead vocals, rhythm guitar, 12-string guitar, Steel guitar, harmonica
- Alon Oleartchik - vocals, bass guitar
- Yitzhak Klepter (nickname: Churchill) - vocals, electric guitar
- Yoni Rechter - vocals, keyboards
- Meir Fenigstein (nickname: Poogy) - drums, percussion, spoken word and vocals as "Poogy"

Touring members

- Tal Bergman - drums, percussion (1998)
- Yotam Ben Horin - acoustic guitar, backing vocals (2013)
- Gili Shapira - acoustic guitar, backing vocals (2013)
- Guy Mazig - electric guitar, backing vocals (2013)
- Shay Wetzer - drums, percussion (2013)
- Ido Zeleznik - keyboards (2013)

== Albums ==
=== Studio albums ===
- Sipurei Poogy (Hebrew: סיפורי פוגי, lit. "Poogy's Tales") - 1973
- Poogy BePita (Hebrew: פוגי בפיתה, lit. "Poogy in a Pita") - 1974
- Tzafuf BaOzen (Hebrew: צפוף באוזן, lit. "Crowded in the Ear") – 1975

=== Live albums ===
- Kaveret – Hofa'a Chaya, Kayitz 1984 (Hebrew: כוורת – הופעה חיה, קיץ 1984, lit. "Kaveret - Live Concert, Summer 1984") - 1984
- Kaveret BaPark (Hebrew: כוורת בפארק, lit. "Kaveret in the Park") – 1998
- HaMofa HaAcharon (Hebrew: המופע האחרון, lit. "The Last Concert") - 2013

=== Compilations ===
- Kaveret BeKufsa – Antologia 1971–1976 (Hebrew: כוורת בקופסה – אנתולוגיה 1971–1976, lit. "Kaveret in a Box – Anthology 1971–1976") - 2013

=== DVDs and videos ===
- HaMofa HaAcharon (Hebrew: המופע האחרון, lit. "The Last Concert") – 2013
- Kaveret BeKufsa – Antologia 1971–1976 (Hebrew: כוורת בקופסה – אנתולוגיה 1971–1976, lit. "Kaveret in a Box – Anthology 1971–1976") – 2013 (two DVDs are included in the box set).

Awards and achievements
Preceded by Ilanit with Ey Sham	Israel in the Eurovision Song Contest; 1974	Succeeded by Shlomo Artzi with At Va'Ani
