= Gidi Gov =

Israeli singer and artist

Gidi Gov גידי גוב
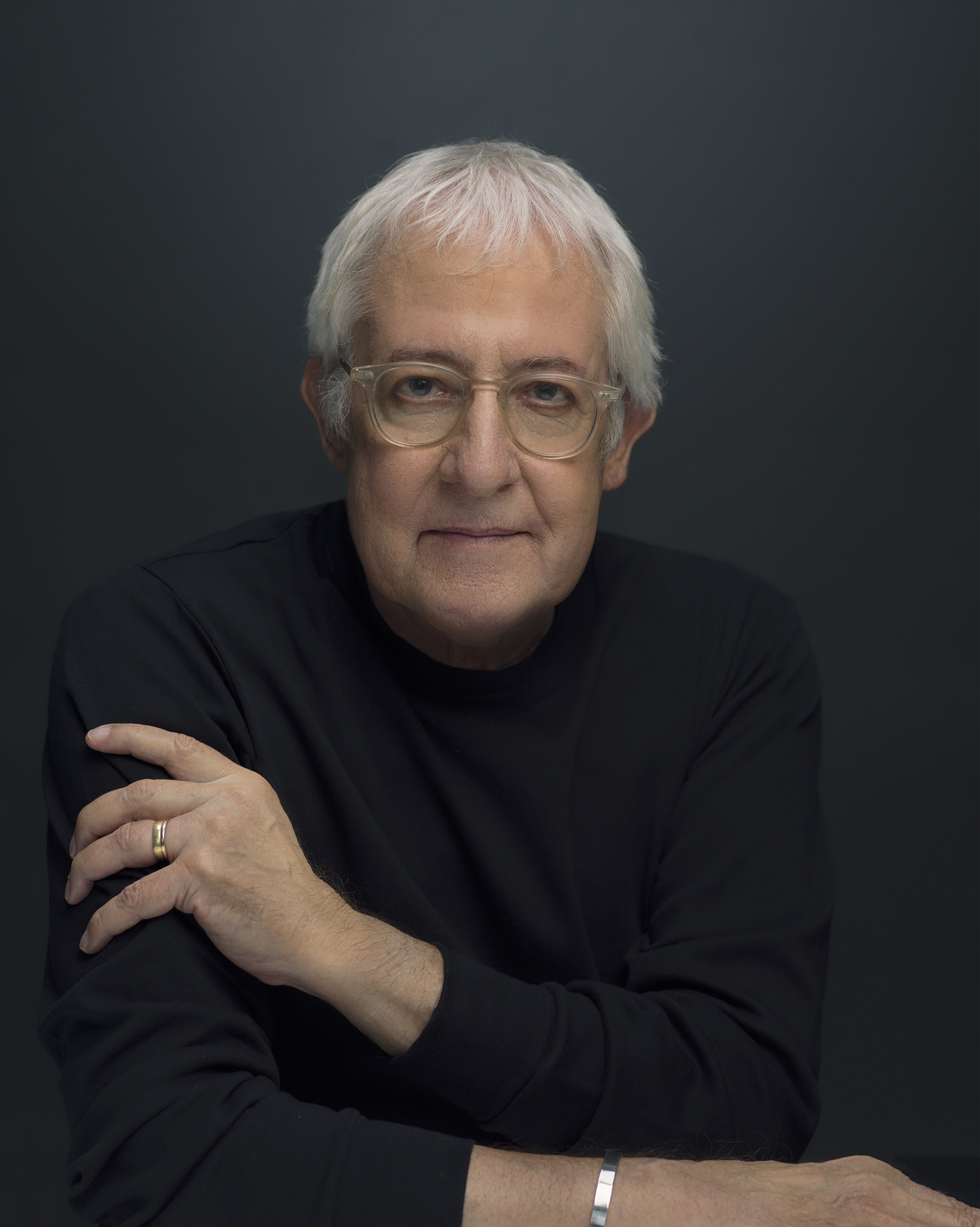

Background information
- Born: Gideon Gov; 4 August 1950 (age 76); Rehovot, Israel
- Origin: Tel Aviv, Israel
- Genres: Rock, Israeli pop, Children’s music
- Years active: 1968–present
- Label: Hed Arzi Music
- Formerly of: The Nahal Band, Kaveret, Gazoz, Doda, Parnasa Tova
- Spouse: Anat Gov (m. 1977; died 2012)

Gideon "Gidi" Ephraim Gov (Hebrew: גידי גוב; 4 August 1950) is an Israeli singer, television presenter and actor. He was married to the screenwriter and playwright Anat Gov, who died in 2012. They had three children.

== Biography ==
=== Early life ===
Gov was born in Rehovot to Daniel (original surname Langer) and Tzipora Gov (née Katz). His maternal grandfather was the art critic Yitzhak Katz. Gov's father served as an adjutant to the IDF Chief of Staff Yigal Yadin. As a child, Gov suffered from asthma. Gov's father died when he was young, and he moved frequently as a child, including living in Tel Aviv and Eilat. In Eilat, Gov was active in the local scouts. Gov's mother knew Yair Rosenblum, which eventually led him to audition for a military band.

As a child, Gov never aspired to become a singer. When he enlisted in the Israel Defense Forces in 1969, Yair Rosenblum recommended that Gov audition for Lehakat HaNahal (Nahal Troupe). Gov passed the auditions and began his entertainment career. He performed on the band's 1969 album "BeHeyachazut HaNahal BaSinai" and 1972 album "HaNahal HaRishonim".

=== 1970s ===
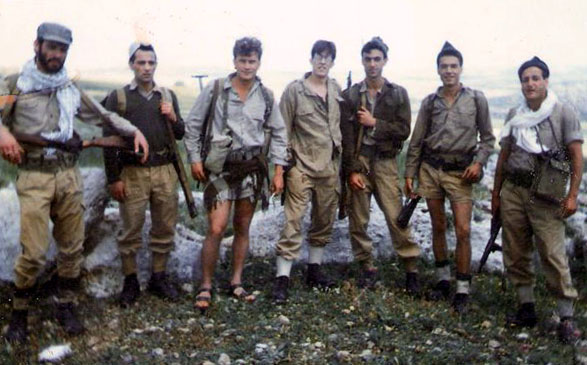
Gidi Gov (center) on the set of the 1978 film "Khirbet Khize"

Gidi Gov's first major breakthrough occurred in the 1973 Festival HaZemer v'haPizmon (פסטיבל הזמר והפזמון - Israeli Song and Chorus Festival), where he performed the song Ya'ale v'yvo (יעלה ויבוא - Go Up and Arrive). Although the song placed eighth, it became one of the most recognizable songs from the competition.

During the same year, Gov established along with some of the former Nahal troupe members (Efraim Shamir, Danny Sanderson and Alon Olearchik) and two others (Yoni Rechter and Yitzhak Klepter) the band Kaveret (כוורת - Bee Hive). The band became one of the most popular Israeli bands in the 1970s and is still considered one of the most successful Israeli bands in the history of popular music and entertainment in Israel. The band released three albums, represented Israel in the 1974 Eurovision Song Contest with the song Natati la chaiyi (Natati La Khayay - I Gave Her my Life) and won the title Band of the Year four times in succession in the Israeli annual Hebrew song chart of Kol Yisrael (Voice of Israel). The band was eventually disbanded in 1976.

After the breakup of Kaveret, Gov joined the short-lived band Parnasa Tova, which included Yehudit Ravitz and Shmulik Bilu. The band recorded several cover versions of old songs and produced an album. In 1978, Gov put out his first solo album תקליט ראשון ("Taklit Rishon", or "First Album"). In addition to his musical career, during the 1970s Gov also participated in the 1974 Israeli TV series דלת הקסמים (" Delet HaKsamim", or The Magic Door); in the 1977 Israeli film מסע אלונקות ("Masa Alonkot", or Journey of the stretchers); in Ram Loevy's 1978 film חירבט חיזה ("Khirbet Khize"); the 1978 film Ha-Lehaka (הלהקה - The Troupe), which described the life in an Israeli military performing troupe; the 1979 film "Dizengoff 99"; and the 1979 film Al Tishol Im Ani Ohev (אל תשאלי אם אני אוהב - Don't Ask if I Love).

In 1979, Gov became a co-host of the TV show Zehu Ze! (זהו זה -That's It!). Gov appeared intermittently in this show until it ended in 1993.

In 1979, Gov formed the successful Israeli pop-rock band Gazoz (גזוז - soda) together with Danny Sanderson. They recorded and released the albums Gazoz and Gilgul Sheni (גלגול שני - Second Reincarnation).

=== 1980s ===
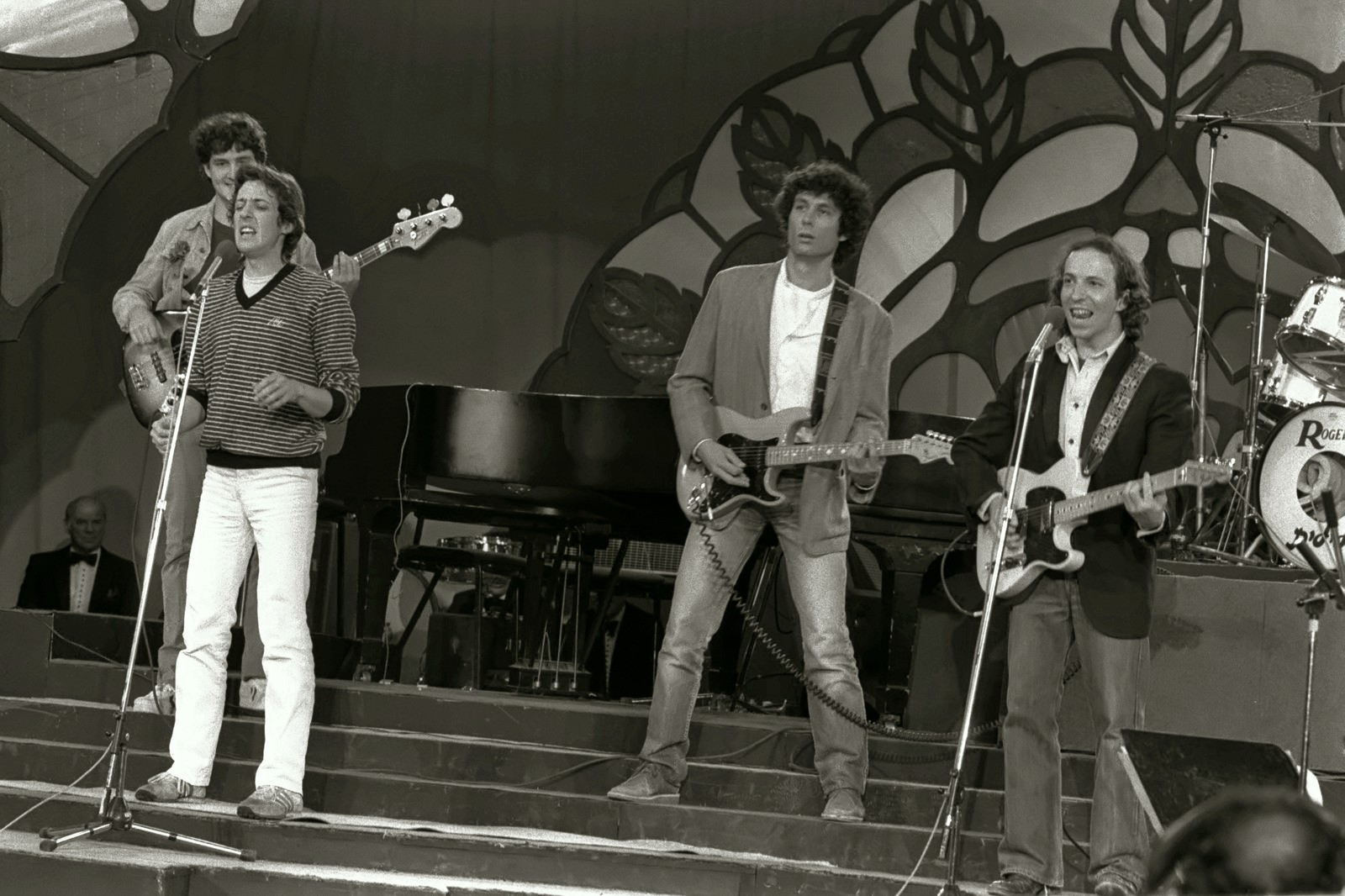
Gidi Gov (front-left) performing with his pop group Doda in the Mann Auditorium in Tel Aviv, 13 April 1981

In 1980, Gov and Sanderson formed their third band Doda, which was less successful than Kaveret and Gazoz.

During the early 1980s, Gov participated in several Israeli children's music festivals.

In 1983, Gov released his second album, "40:06", after the album's total length.

In the same year, Gov appeared in the Israeli film Magash haKesef (מגש הכסף - Silver Platter).

In 1985, Gov released his third solo album, Tnu Ligdol Besheket (תנו ליגדול בשקט - Let Me Grow Up in Peace), which included mostly children's songs.

From 1986 to 1992, Gov participated in almost all the Israeli children's music, and hosted it 1986.

In 1987, Gov decided to release the rock oriented album Derech Eretz (דרך ארץ - Respect), produced by Louie Lahav. The majority of songs on the album were composed by Yehuda Poliker. The album was a big success and sold more than 50,000 copies – Gov's best selling album until then.

In 1989, Gov participated in the play "The Gigolo from Congo" by Hanoch Levin, and performed the title song "What Do You Know About Love?" (מה אתה בכלל יודע על אהבה) for the film "Ehad Mishelanu".

=== 1990s ===
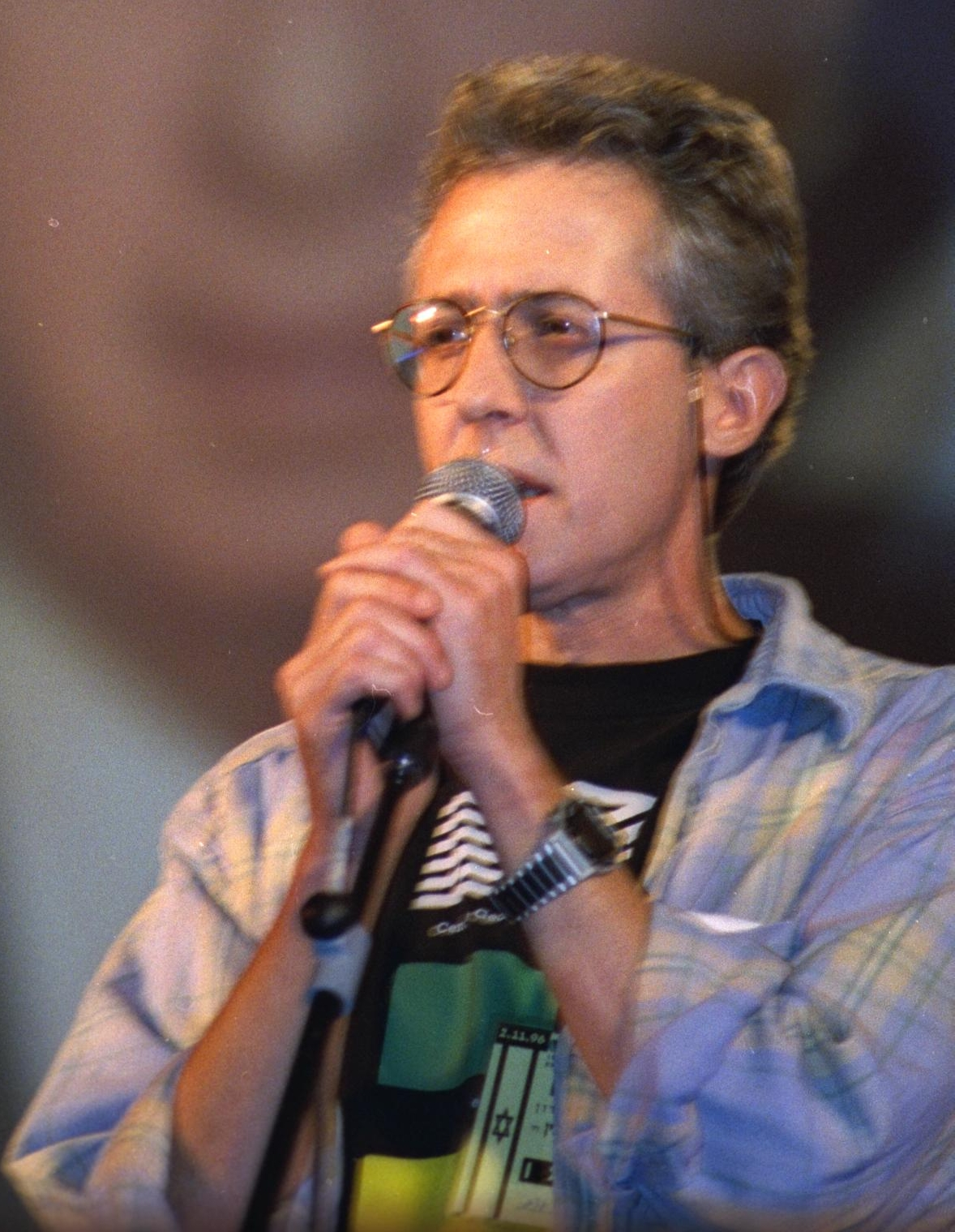
Gidi Gov performing at the memorial service held for PM Yitzhak Rabin. 11 February 1996

In 1991 Gov released one of his most successful solo albums – Ein Od Yom ("No Other Day"). The album sold more than 70,000 copies. In 1993 Gov released the compilation album "שירים שהתפזרו", which containing different original songs performed by Gov between 1973 and 1992 which did not appear in his previous solo albums. In 1994 he left "Zehu Ze!" to his own host musical/talk show, "Laila Gov" (a play on the phrase "laila tov", meaning "good night"), on Channel 2, Israel's first commercial TV channel. The show which aired from 1994 to 1998 became very successful. During the show Gov used to regularly perform different songs along with different popular Israeli singers whom were guests on the show. Subsequently, in 1995 Gov released the double disc compilation album "שירים מלילה גוב", and in 1997 released the triple disc compilation album "שירים מלילה גוב 2" which both contained the songs Gov performed during the show with his guests. One of the guests was Gabi Shoshan, a Moroccan-born Israeli singer and actor. Together they sung Shoshan's hit "Shesh Esre Malou La'Naar" (The Boy is 16).

=== 2000s ===
In 2000 Gov began hosting a dining TV show on the Israeli Channel 8 called "Gidi Gov goes to eat" (גידי גוב הולך לאכול) and appeared in a one time special Kaveret reunion concert designed to raise money for an urgent surgery of the band member Isaac Klepter. This year also instructed the Tammuz Awards Israeli music, held for the first time was broadcast on Channel 2. Gov off the ceremony again the following year, until it was decided to stop at the end of 2002 to comply.

In 2001 Gov participated in Danny Sanderson's album "תולדות המים – שירים לאחרים" in which Gov performed Sanderson's song "רק את". In 2002 Gov returned to Channel with the show "Laila Gov 2", which was similar to his previous talk show, but failed to repeat its success and was eventually canceled after the first season. In 2003, 12 years after his last solo studio album was released, Gov recorded the album "Rikud Yare'ach" ("Moon Dance"). In 2004 Gov recorded the album "At the end of the mountain" (בקצה ההר) which was mainly written and composed by Amir Benayon. The album was released in early 2005. In 2006 Gov hosted the morning program on Channel 2. In 2007 Gov participated in the Israeli reality show "Once in a lifetime" (פעם בחיים), in which he went to a spiritual commune in the jungles of Costa Rica for two weeks together with the Israeli journalist Gil Riva. In 2008 Gov participated in satire show "גם להם מגיע " together with Lior Ashkenazi and Anat Magen. In 2009 the Israeli label Hed Artzi released the triple disc compilation album "שלל שיריו" which contained Gov's biggest hits through the years.

=== 2010s ===
In June 2011, Israel TV channel Channel 10 started broadcasting the series "Aharoni & Gidi's Wonderful Journey" with Gidi Gov and chef Yisrael Aharoni. A month later Channel 2 started broadcasting the series "The most beautiful years", in which Gov plays a school principal who dies. That same year, he started doing commercials for Bezeq WiFi. In 2012 Gidi appears as a judge on the 10th season of the Israeli version of American Idol – Kohav nolad. In August 2015 he released the album Im Hayinu (If We Were).

=== 2020s ===
In 2024, it was announced Gov would reunited Yoni Rechter, David Broza and Yehudit Ravitz for "The 16th Sheep" reunion concerts in Israel. Tickets for the concert, which took place on January 22, 2025, at the Tel Aviv Culture Hall, sold out within minutes.

In 2025 stated in a public letter among other israeli artists against "the horrific actions conducted by our government in Gaza”.

== Solo discography ==
Year	Album
1978	Taklit Rishon (תקליט ראשון)
1983	40:06
1985	Tnu Ligdol Besheket (תנו לגדול בשקט)
1987	Derech Eretz (דרך ארץ)
1991	Ein Od Yom (אין עוד יום)
2003	Rikud Yare'ach (ריקוד ירח)
2005	Biktze Ha'har (בקצה ההר)
2015	Im Hayinu (אם היינו)
