= Hed Arzi Music =

Israeli record label

Hed Arzi הד ארצי
- Founded: 1946
- Founder: Zvi Levin
- Genre: Various
- Country of origin: Israel
- Location: Tel Aviv
- Official website: www.hed-arzi.co.il

Hed Arzi Music (Hebrew: הד ארצי, meaning: Echo of My Country) is an Israeli record label founded in 1946.

== History ==
The company was founded in Tel Aviv in 1946 as a partnership of Zvi Levin (also known as Hirsch Lewin) with Josef Grossman, Alexander Borowitz and Ephraim Ruttenberg. Mr. Levin was a refugee from Berlin where he has owned and operated a bookshop and recording label Semer (from the Hebrew "Zemer", meaning song). The Semer label operated from approximately 1932 until the recording masters and inventory were smashed and burned during Kristallnacht. Hed-Arzi started operating in September 1947, managed by Ephraim Felix Rzeczynski, making it the oldest recording company in Israel (followed by Makolit in Jaffa, Tslil in Tel-Aviv and others).

Originally the company produced 78 rpm gramophone records (including re-issues of Semer recordings), the most popular among which were Agala Vesoussa and Bab El-Wad by Yaffa Yarkoni as well as Kalaniot and Ani Mitzfat by Shoshana Damari. In 1951, company started building a plant in Ramat-Gan. In 1955, the first LP was manufactured (6 songs of Shoshana Damari). In 1958, it recorded its first stereo record and was considered "the biggest and most modern record manufacturer in the Near East with steady increasing export activities to nearly 30 countries" or the "leading distributor and manufacturer in Israel". Until 1960, the company has produced over 1250 titles of conventional records, about 700 records 7" in diameter and over 320 LP records; its income was $25,000 a year. In late 1961, the company issued a documentary LP Echoes of the Eichmann trial.

In 1980, 50% share was sold to Modi’in Publishing House, ltd. (the parent company of the newspaper Maariv), since 1993 owned by Israel Land Development Company, ltd.

Since 2008, ownership is held by NMC United (owner of NMC Music).

== Notable artists ==
- The Dudaim
- Shoshana Damari
- Yaffa Yarkoni
- David D'Or
- Gidi Gov
- Sarit Hadad
- Ofra Haza
- Poogy
- Harel Skaat
- Teapacks
- Dana International
- Boaz Mauda
- Yehoram Gaon
- The Churchills

== See also ==
- Music of Israel
- Piposh, a video game franchise published by the video game subsidiary Hed Arzi Multimedia.
