= List of programs broadcast by Channel 1 (Israel) =

This is a list of programs formerly broadcast by the Israeli Channel 1.

== Formerly broadcast by Channel 1 ==
Prominent Channel 1 TV productions formerly broadcast on Channel 1:

=== Channel 1 productions ===
- Diary (יומן) a weekly current affairs news show, it's transmitted every Friday at night .
- Everything Justiciable (הכל שפיט)
- Garlic, Pepper and Olive Oil (שום פלפל ושמן זית)
- IBA News - the channel's daily news broadcast in English
- It is time for language (הגיע זמן לשון)
- The Jews are Coming (היהודים באים)
- Like It Was (כך היה)
- Mabat LaHadashot (מבט לחדשות) - evening news and current affairs, formerly presented by Haim Yavin
- MeHayom LeMahar (מהיום למחר) - a current affairs news show broadcast half an hour before midnight
- Psuko Shel Yom (פסוקו של יום) - a daily midnight program reciting selected daily biblical, Midrash or Aggadah verses
- A second look (מבט שני)
- View of the World (רואים עולם)

==== Current events ====
- Almost midnight (כמעט חצות)
- Focus (מוקד)
- Good Morning Israel (בוקר טוב ישראל)
- The news of the past week (חדשות השבוע)
- Popolitika (פופוליטיקה)
- Press Conference (מסיבת עיתונאים)
- Sports Broadcast (מבט ספורט)

==== Investigative shows ====
- Kolbotek (כלבוטק)

==== Documentaries ====
- Barricades (מיתרסים)
- Clean the head is necessary (ניקוי הראש הוא הכרחי)
- End of the oranges season (סוף עונת התפוזים)
- The Film that Wasn't (הסרט שלא היה)
- In the Jewish state (במדינת היהודים)
- Pillar of Fire (עמוד האש)
- The representatives (הנבחרים)
- Revival (תקומה)
- To the water wells (אל בורות המים)

==== Culture shows ====
- Ad pop (עד פופ)
- Another Hit (עוד להיט)
- A hit to the head (להיט בראש)
- Made in Israel (תוצרת הארץ)
- What a life (חיים שכאלה)

==== Entertainment shows ====
- Cleaning the head (ניקוי ראש)
- The coop group (חבורת לול)
- From Menny (ממני)
- Motzash (מוצ"ש)
- Shulchan Aruch with Doron Nesher (שולחן ארוך עם דורון נשר)
- This is my secret (זה הסוד שלי)

==== Sports programs ====
- First Goal (שער ראשון)
- Saturday's Game (משחק השבת)
- Sports broadcast (מבט ספורט)

==== Original series ====
- Chedva & Shlomick (חדווה ושלומיק)
- Late-night stories (סיפורים לשעת לילה מאוחרת)
- Michel Ezra Safra and his Sons (מישל עזרא ספרא ובניו)

==== Youth programs ====
- Animals and smiles (חיות וחיוכים)
- Cabbage head (ראש כרוב)
- Carousel (קרוסלה)
- Foxy Fables (משלים שועליים)
- Hopa Hey (הופה היי)
- Jinji (ג'ינג'י)
- Kindergarten Party (מסיבת גן)
- The last vication (החופש האחרון)
- Legends of King Solomon (אגדות המלך שלמה)
- Sammy and Soosoo (סמי וסוסו)
- Service is not included (לא כולל שירות)
- Shmil the cat (החתול שמיל)
- Suspended in the air (תלויים באוויר)
- Take a chance (קח סיכוי)
- Tamari's hut (הצריף של תמרי)
- Telepele (טלפלא)
- Three Four Five and a half (שלוש ארבע חמש וחצי)
- Tofsim Rosh (תופסים ראש)
- Toses (תוססס)
- Trust me (סמוך עליי)
- The Tsatskanim (הצצקנים)
- Tzipi nonstop (ציפי בלי הפסקה)
- Tzippi Without a Break (ציפי בלי הפסקה)
- Zap La Rishon (זאפ לראשון)
- Zipper (ריץ' רץ')

==== Sitcoms ====
- HaMis'ada HaGdola (המסעדה הגדולה)
- Neighbors (שכנים)
- So what? (כן מה?)
- Straight to the point (סטרייט ולעניין)

==== Hosting shows ====
- Friday with Gaon (שישי בגאון)
- Friday with Michal (שישי עם מיכל)
- A reason to celebrate (סיבה למסיבה)
- Weekend (סופשבוע)

=== Imported TV shows ===
- CSI: Crime Scene Investigation
- CSI: Miami
- CSI: NY
- Degrassi: The Next Generation
- Downton Abbey
- Fargo
- Law & Order: Special Victims Unit
- The Simpsons

==== Children's/animated ====
- 3-2-1 Contact
- 100 Deeds for Eddie McDowd
- The Adventures of Grady Greenspace
- The Adventures of Tintin
- Animal Crackers
- Around the World in Eighty Days
- Barbapapa
- Belle and Sebastian
- Big Blue Marble
- Biker Mice From Mars
- Bosco Adventure
- Bouli
- The Busy World of Richard Scarry
- The California Raisin Show
- Camp Candy
- The Castle of Adventure
- Captain Planet and the Planeteers
- Care Bears
- Chip 'n Dale Rescue Rangers
- The Chronicles of Narnia
- Clue Club
- C.O.P.S.
- Count Duckula
- The Cramp Twins
- The Crayon Box
- Danger Mouse
- Dennis and Gnasher
- Dennis the Menace
- Denver, the Last Dinosaur
- Digimon Adventure
- Digimon Adventure 02
- Disney's Adventures of the Gummi Bears
- Ducktales
- Elly & Jools
- Flipper & Lopaka
- Foofur
- Fox's Peter Pan & the Pirates
- Fushigi no Kuni no Alice
- G.I. Joe: A Real American Hero
- Garfield and Friends
- Girlstuff/Boystuff
- Gophers!
- Grabbit the Rabbit
- The Girl from Tomorrow
- Hallo Spencer
- Harry and His Bucket Full of Dinosaurs
- The Harveytoons Show
- Huckleberry Finn and His Friends
- The Incredible Hulk
- The Jungle Book
- Kaboodle
- Kidd Video
- La Linea
- Lassie
- The Lionhearts
- Li'l Horrors
- Little Dracula
- The Littlest Hobo
- Little Lulu and Her Little Friends
- Little Women
- Looney Tunes
- Lucky Luke
- Macron 1
- Magical Princess Minky Momo
- Muppet Babies
- Kaboodle (Season 2)
- Jimbo and the Jet-Set
- S Club 7 in Miami
- The Mask: Animated Series
- Maya the Bee
- Maple Town
- Meet the Raisins!
- Misi mókus kalandjai
- Mr. Hiccup
- My Little Pony
- The New Adventures of Winnie the Pooh
- Nick & Perry
- Ovide and the Gang
- The Pink Panther (1993)
- The Pink Panther Show
- Postman Pat
- The Power Team
- Pumuckl
- The Raccoons
- Rotten Ralph
- Rugrats
- Science Ninja Team Gatchaman
- The Smurfs
- Snorks
- Space Battleship Yamato
- Spider-Man
- Spiff and Hercules
- Sport Billy
- The Spooktacular New Adventures of Casper
- Stoppit and Tidyup
- Teenage Mutant Ninja Turtles
- Teletubbies
- Tiny Toon Adventures
- Tom & Jerry Kids
- Tweenies
- Victor & Hugo: Bunglers in Crime
- Visionaries: Knights of the Magical Light
- What About Mimi?
- The World of Tosh
- Woof!
- X-Men: The Animated Series

==== Teen drama ====
- Byker Grove
- Degrassi
- Fame
- Heartbreak High

==== Soap Opera ====
- The Brothers
- Families

==== Comedy ====
- ALF
- All in the Family
- Are You Being Served?
- Benson
- The Brady Bunch
- Brooklyn Bridge
- Condo
- The Cosby Show
- Coupling
- Dear John
- Diff'rent Strokes
- E/R
- The Fanelli Boys
- Fawlty Towers
- Fish
- Good Morning, Miss Bliss
- Happy Days
- Harper Valley PTA
- Head of the Class
- Home Improvement
- It's a Living
- It's Your Move
- Jennifer Slept Here
- Ladies Man
- Love, American Style
- Love, Sidney
- Mama Malone
- Mr. Belvedere
- Mr. Merlin
- The Muppet Show
- Night Court
- The Odd Couple
- The Partridge Family
- Police Squad!
- Rhoda
- Roseanne
- Soap
- Square Pegs
- Tabitha
- Taxi
- The Thin Blue Line
- Three's Company
- Three Up, Two Down
- To the Manor Born
- Tom, Dick and Harriet
- The Tony Randall Show
- The Two of Us
- Webster
- Who's the Boss?
- Yes Minister

==== Comedy Dramas ====
- A Fine Romance
- Eight Is Enough
- The Greatest American Hero
- Northern Exposure

==== Mini-series ====
- All the Rivers Run
- I, Claudius
- If Tomorrow Comes
- Lace
- North and South
- Princess Daisy
- Rich Man, Poor Man
- Roots
- Sins

==== Supernatural/sci-fi/action/adventure ====
- The A-Team
- The Adventures of Black Beauty
- Amazing Stories
- Airwolf
- Are You Afraid of the Dark?
- Automan
- Buck Rogers in the 25th Century
- Charlie's Angels
- Columbo
- The Flash
- Hercules: The Legendary Journeys
- Here's Boomer
- MacGyver
- Man from Atlantis
- Manimal
- Mission: Impossible
- Primus
- The Prisoner
- The Six Million Dollar Man
- Spellbinder
- Spellbinder: Land of the Dragon Lord
- Stargate Atlantis
- Stargate SG-1
- Starsky and Hutch
- Threshold
- The Time Tunnel
- The Tripods
- V: The Series
- Voyagers!
- Whiz Kids
- Xena: Warrior Princess
- Zorro

==== Drama/mystery ====
- Blue Thunder
- The Brothers
- The Campbells
- Daktari
- Dallas
- Dynasty
- Hart to Hart
- The High Chaparral
- Hill Street Blues
- Homicide: Life on the Street
- Hornblower
- Ironside
- Jake and the Fatman
- Jonathan Creek
- Kojak
- L.A. Law
- Law & Order
- Little House on the Prairie
- McCloud
- Northern Exposure
- Murder, She Wrote
- The Onedin Line
- Paradise
- Quincy, M.E.
- Reilly, Ace of Spies
- Road to Avonlea
- Rumpole of the Bailey
- Simon & Simon
- Spender
- St. Elsewhere
- Thirtysomething
- Trapper John, M.D.
- Twin Peaks
- Upstairs, Downstairs
- Wiseguy
