= Ram Loevy =

Israeli film director (1940–2025)

- רם לוי
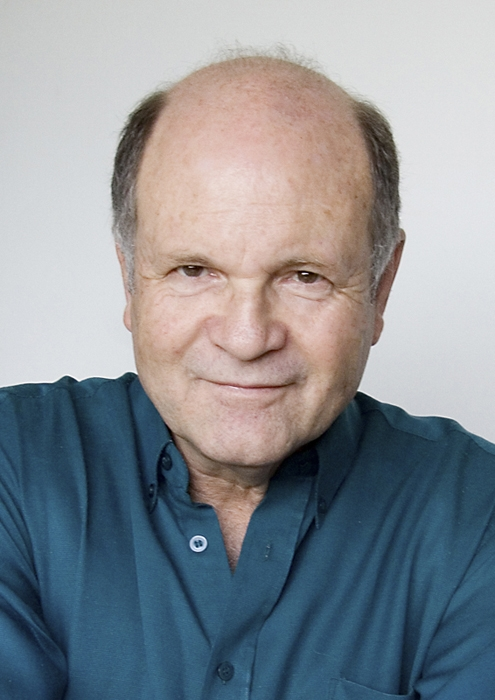
- Born: August 1, 1940; Tel Aviv, Mandatory Palestine
- Died: November 30, 2025 (aged 85)
- Occupations: Director; screenwriter
- Years active: 1968–2025
- Awards: Prix Italia; Won: Best Film; 1986 Bread

Ram Loevy (Hebrew: רם לוי; August 1, 1940 – November 30, 2025) was an Israeli television director and screenwriter. He wrote and directed documentary films that challenged the status quo on such issues as class conflict, torture, the prison system, and the Israeli–Palestinian conflict. In 1993, Loevy was awarded the Israel Prize in Communication, Radio and Television in 1993 for his life's work.

Loevy was Professor Emeritus of Cinema and Television at Tel Aviv University.

== Background ==
Ram Loevy was the son of Theodor Loevy, a journalist and his wife Elisa, originally from Poland. His father was the editor of the Danziger Echo, a prominent Jewish newspaper in the Free City of Danzig, who had been jailed for publishing anti-Nazi articles in his paper. Upon his release he fled to Poland, but that country later expelled him in the months leading up to World War II, under pressure from the authorities in Nazi Germany. He and his wife arrived in Mandatory Palestine just three months before Ram Loevy was born.

Loevy grew up in Tel Aviv, where he attended the Carmel School and Municipal High School A. As a boy, he was active in the Scouts and in the paramilitary Gadna program, in which high school age boys and girls undergo paramilitary training in preparation for military service. It was in the Scouts that he met his wife Zipora. Upon being drafted to the Israel Defense Forces, he served in a Nahal unit that combined military training with agricultural work on a kibbutz. He was sent to Kibbutz Gal'ed in northern Israel, near the large Israeli Arab town of Umm al-Fahm. He later worked on Kibbutz Sde Boker in the Negev.

Upon completing his military service, Loevy majored in Economics and Political Science at the Hebrew University of Jerusalem. At the same time, he dabbled in theater by participating in student productions, and worked at the national Voice of Israel radio station as a program editor, actor, producer, director, and skit-writer.. In 1967, upon completing his degree, he traveled to London to attend the London Film School (then known as the London School of Film Technique). Loevy's stay in London was cut short by the Six-Day War. Loevy returned to Israel to serve in the army. Soon after the war, he returned to London to continue his studies and worked as an assistant director at Elstree Studios for the British espionage/science fiction adventure series The Champions. At the same time, he was also an announcer for the BBC's Hebrew-language department.

Loevy suffered from Parkinson's disease, and died on 30 November 2025, at the age of 85.

== Media career ==
Loevy made his first foray into film as the assistant director for a documentary film, Sand Screen by Baruch Dinar, with American journalist Drew Pearson. This was immediately followed by work on the documentary I Ahmad (1966), directed by Avshalom Katz, for which he served as the executive producer and co-screenwriter. The film told the story of an Arab laborer's journey from the Triangle to Tel Aviv.

In 1968, while in London, Loevy proposed to create a documentary film about the rifts in Israeli society. Though the BBC expressed interest in the project, Loevy abandoned it in order to return to Israel and help the Israel Broadcasting Authority launch the country's first attempt at television broadcasting, Channel 1, which began broadcasting on 2 May 1968. In addition to his work on the new channel's weekly shows, he also directed a number of documentary films for it:

- Barricades (1969), which examined the Arab-Israel conflict from the perspective of two families, one Jewish and one Palestinian.
- Israel in the '80s, (2 films, 1971), speculating on the future of Israeli education.
- Don't Think Twice, (1972), about preparations by the Habima Theatre for a new stage production by Nisim Aloni. The film was nominated for the prestigious Prix Italia for Radio and Television.
- Time Out (1975), on encounters between young Arabs and Jews.

Already in these early works, Loevy focused on two themes that would dominate his later projects: the tense relationship between Arabs and Jews in Israel, and the role of education and art in shaping a society. His next documentary would introduce another key theme: the inequities of class disparity and discrimination between Jews and Arabs in Israel, and between Jewish Israelis.

- Second Generation Poor, (1976), was a two-part series that offered a chilling look at the effects of poverty in Israel.

In 1971, he directed seven short films based on the poetry of Yiddish writer Kadya Moldovsky.

== First features for television ==
These films can be divided into two groups: two films released in 1972, and two released in 1975. They are:

- Rose Water from Port Said (1972), based on a story by Gideon Talpaz, tells of a landlady who runs a boarding house in Jerusalem at the time of the British Mandate. One day, she receives a Black slave from the Sudan as a gift. Though the film was set in the relatively distant past, in 1932, this first attempt at drama already hints at two of the major themes that appear throughout Loevy's later work: class distinctions and ethnic differences.
- The Fifth Hand, also from 1972, breaks from the serious nature of Loevy's themes to tell the story of a group of people addicted to the game of bridge. Nevertheless, his insights into the role that leisure activities play in people's lives would be echoed over thirty years later in one of his most riveting documentaries, Sakhnin, My Life, about the Bnei Sakhnin football club from the Arab town of Sakhnin.
- The Bride and the Butterfly Hunter (1974) is a quirky, surrealistic film version of a play by Nisim Aloni about a bride who flees her wedding and a clerk who flees his humdrum existence by escaping to the park every Wednesday afternoon to hunt—and release—butterflies. The encounter between the two takes place in a park, where political propaganda is broadcast over a loudspeaker system. Though this is not integral to the story, it indicates that even in the most whimsical encounters it is impossible to escape the overbearing presence of political forces exploiting the conflicts in Israel for their own advantage. This film was selected to represent Israel at the Prix Italia.
- Stella (1975) is a love story about an affair between a piano teacher and a messenger boy. It was also selected to represent Israel at the Prix Italia.

== Khirbet Khize ==
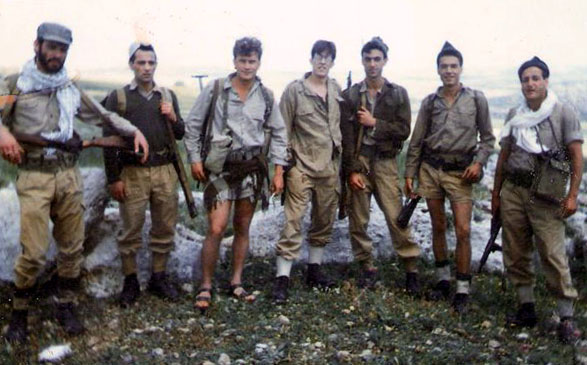
Khirbet Khize cast: Amos Tal Shir, Itzik Aloni, Dalik Volonitz, Gidi Gov, Avi Luzia, Shraga Harpaz, and Avraham Sidi

In 1978, Loevy was propelled into the spotlight for his dramatization of the novella Khirbet Khizeh (חרבת חיזעה) by S. Yizhar. The story, written in May 1949, tells of how Israeli soldiers expelled the Palestinian inhabitants of the fictional village of Khirbet Khize from their homes toward the end of the 1948 Arab-Israeli War. Though controversial, the story was well-known, and had been incorporated into the Israeli curriculum. S. Yizhar was a highly respected author, a recipient of the Israel Prize, and served in the Knesset from 1949 to 1967.

Loevy first proposed the dramatization of the story in 1972, but was rejected by the Israel Broadcasting Authority. He submitted the proposal again in 1977, this time with a script by Daniella Carmi, hoping that the film would be used to mark Israel's 30th Independence Day. This time the film was approved, and he was given a budget of IL700,000, an enormous sum at the time. He filmed in the West Bank and completed the film in August of that year. There was some debate over whether the film should be screened because of its controversial nature, but after a screening before the board of the IBA, it was decided to go ahead. In 1977, while the film was being produced, a new government headed by Menachem Begin was voted into power, Anwar Sadat visited Jerusalem, and people from across the political spectrum began to question whether it should be screened, given the sensitivity of potential peace negotiations. Khirbet Khize was originally planned to be aired on 16 January 1978, but on that day the joint Israeli-Egyptian Political Committee first met in Jerusalem, and it was deemed inappropriate. When the talks broke down in February, it was decided to screen the film in the context of a political talk show to enable a public debate. A decision was made to reconvene the IBA board to make a final decision, as two members were opposed, but in the end, Minister of Education Zevulon Hammer stepped in and blocked the film from being aired at all.

This prompted a bitter debate in Israel, with Knesset member Yossi Sarid of the Labor Party declaring that "Freedom of expression in Israel has been brought to half-mast!". Some reports even claimed that Begin himself was stunned that the film was being censored. In protest at the ministerial decision, IBA employees decided to black out the broadcast for 48 minutes during the night that Khirbet Khize was to be screened (February 6, 1978) to protest the IBA's decision to allow the government to intervene in television broadcasting. The next week, the Board of the IBA decided to screen the film. It aired on 13 February 1978, and Ram Loevy earned the reputation of an iconoclast who was willing and able to fight a deeply politicized system. This was a turning point in his career, and his later films continued to challenge the established mythology of modern Israel.

Loevy then made two documentary films about the theatre and its role in society. It was a theme he had addressed in Don't Think Twice, but these films highlighted the role he believed theatre plays in the political discourse.

- Playing Devils, Playing Angels (1979) followed a Haifa theatre troupe to the development town of Kiryat Shmona on the tense northern border with Lebanon. The border town had been the site of a massacre of eighteen people (including nine children) in 1974, and had long been the target of Katyusha rocket attacks from across the border. What distinguished this film however, was its depiction of the encounter between volunteers from the relatively affluent cities and what became known as the "Second Israel": impoverished Mizrahi Jews of Middle Eastern and North African descent. Attitudes toward this underclass would emerge as a major theme in Loevy's work.

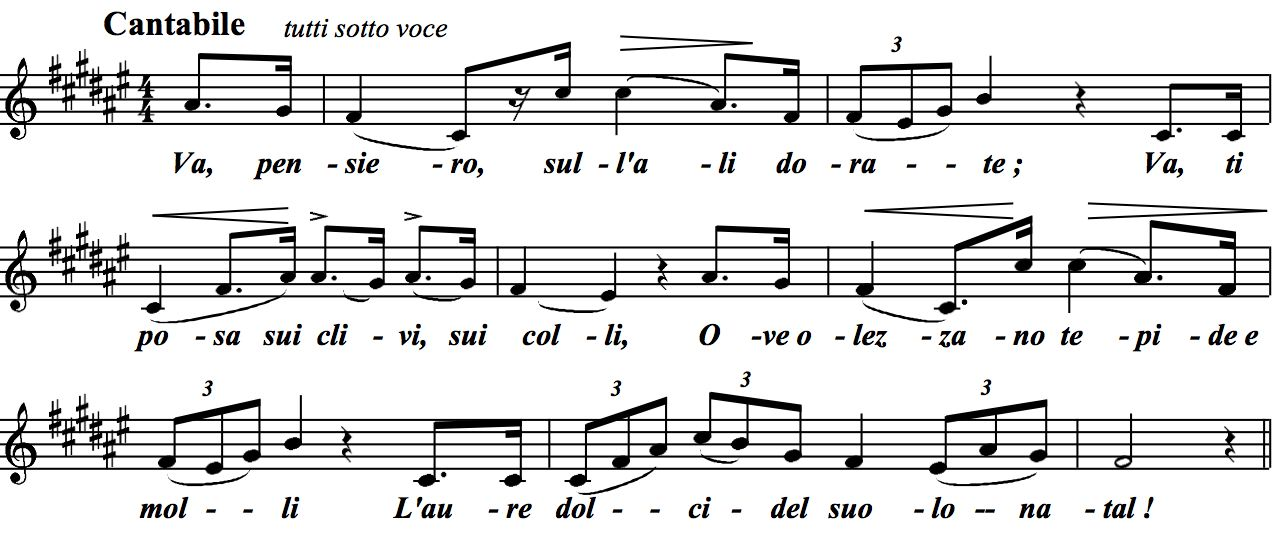
The nationalist aria "Va, pensiero!, sung by Hebrew slaves in Verdi's Nabucco, was a highlight of the performance in Caesarea.

- Nebuchadnezzar in Caesarea (1980), about a performance of Giuseppe Verdi's opera Nabucco by the Deutsche Oper Berlin at the ancient Roman amphitheatre in Caesarea. The opera tells the story of Nebuchadnezzar, who destroyed the biblical Kingdom of Judah. It was performed in a theatre built by the Romans, who destroyed Judah's successor state, the Hasmonean kingdom of Judea, by the successor generation of Nazi Germany, which perpetrated the Holocaust against the Jewish people, successors of Judah and Judea, in their own, newly established homeland. The nationalist aria "Va, pensiero!"—a highlight of the opera—had especial significance for the audience. The line O mia patria, si bella e perduta ("O my country, so lovely and so lost"), sung by Jewish exiles, particularly resonated with the audience. In another poignant scene, the opera's German producer apologized to a group of Jewish extras for asking them to play Babylonians, while German performers played persecuted Jews.
- Indian in the Sun (1981) was based on a short story by Israeli journalist and author Adam Baruch, with a script by Dita Guery (with Micha Levtov and Ram Loevy). In Playing Devils, Playing Angels, Loevy examined the relationship between affluent, urban Israelis and the "Second Israel" as a documentarian. In this film, he dramatized the conflicts and similarities between the two groups. The story revolves around Laufer (played by Doron Nesher), an Israeli soldier from the wealthy suburbs of northern Tel Aviv, who is ordered to accompany another soldier, known only as "the Indian (played by Haim Gerafi)", to prison. "The Indian" was a dark-skinned Cochin Jew and a moshavnik (though Gerafi himself was an Ethiopian Jew), and the film highlights the patronizing attitude that Laufer has to his charge. Over time, however, and as the driver (played by Moshe Ivgy) watches, the two realize that they share a common enemy in the Establishment, and Laufer even offers to help the Indian escape. All the while, the driver watches in trepidation as two extremes of the Israeli social spectrum find that they have more in common than they thought, and begin to forge an alliance between them. The film won the Harp of David Award for the best Israeli television production of the year, as well as the Israeli Broadcasting Authority Award.

Loevy spent 1983 in Cambridge, Massachusetts. He had more than anyone shaped the direction of Israeli television as a medium addressing the country's major social issues, and for this he was awarded a Nieman Fellowship by Harvard University. Among the other fellows with whom he studies was Alex Jones, winner of the 1987 Pulitzer Prize. During his year in Harvard, he studied what he called "epic television", and wrote about how a single night of watching American television—(Family Business, the news, and The Love Boat, plus commercials) could be compared to a three-act drama by Bertolt Brecht. He bemoaned the idea of a politically neutral medium of television, and concluded "Television was almost never neutral. On the rare occasions when it took a stand, (McCarthy, the Vietnam War, Watergate), it helped bring a significant change."

Upon returning to Israel, Loevy made a series of four documentary films for Israel TV, PBS, and England's Channel 4:

- The End of the Bathing Season (1983, for Israel TV), about the present, as seen by archeologists of the future.
- The Buck Stops in Brazil (1983, for PBS), about Brazil's national debt.
- Between the River and the Sea (1984, Channel 4) about Rafik Halabi, then a Druze television correspondent in Israel.
- The Million Dollar Scan (1985, PBS/Israel TV coproduction), about the Israeli company Elscint and its magnetic resonance imaging equipment. In 1972 Elscint was the first Israeli company to have an initial public offering on NASDAQ, but in the 1980s, the company suffered a series of severe financial losses that required a government bailout.

At the same time, he was preparing to embark on the project for which he is best known today, a drama about the Second Israel that would shake the country to its core.

== Bread (Lehem) ==
A few years before Loevy left for Harvard, Israel Television commissioned two young scriptwriters, Gilad Evron and Meir Doron, to write a story about the "Second Israel." Loevy had begun to explore this topic in his earlier works such as Indian in the Sun, and when he returned to Israel, he was presented with the first draft of their script. He and the writers spent two years rewriting the script and visiting the development towns of Yeruham, Dimona, and Sderot to meet with the local residents whose stories they wanted to tell, and producing sixteen more drafts until the story was finalized.

In an interview, Loevy later explained the significance of these encounters to him:

The gap between rich and poor is enormous in a country that was once the most egalitarian nation in the world. In the youth movements, Zionism was seen as the Jewish way of achieving social justice that would encompass the whole world. That ideal has been shattered. Now we have the pretension of being an open and attentive socialist welfare state, but in fact, that message only comes from a single direction. The system only responds to those who shout. Those who are silent remain on the outside. The basic human element has disappeared from the system.

Loevy was determined to tell the story of the silenced masses, and he was determined to do it not by shouting but by silence. At a 2006 retrospective of his work, Loevy was introduced as an artist who "creates a silent scream in a soft but overwhelming voice." The result was his film Bread (לחם).

The film tells the story of a Job-like character, Shlomo Elmaliach (played by Rami Danon), who loses his job at his town's local bakery when it is forced to close. Rather than join the other unemployed protesters, Elmaliach locks himself in his home and launches a very personal hunger strike. At first people come to visit him at home, and there's even a rumor that television reporters might show up (quickly dismissed by Elmaliach's friend Zaguri, "They only come when there's a ruckus.") Gradually, even Elmaliach's friends abandon him, and he ends up dragging his family down with him. A son (played by Moshe Ivgy) seeks radical solutions to poverty, a daughter (played by Etti Ankri) who escaped to Tel Aviv to study returns home and takes a job on a production line, and Elmaliach's wife (played by Rivka Bechar) takes a job as a seamstress. At the end of the film, the factory is reopened as a result of all the protests, but by then it is too late for Shlomo Elmaliach.

When Bread was aired in 1986, unemployment was skyrocketing in Israel after a period of relative affluence, and even the Israel Broadcasting Authority had just fired all of its contractors. The social impact was of the film was felt throughout the country, with one critic calling it a "punch in the stomach." That year it was awarded the Prix Italia for television fiction. According to the prize's jury:

Bread is more than the story of a family on the fringes of the Israeli society. It is a commentary on the universal problems of unemployment, pride, stress, and the nature of human life.

Loevy examined the role of music and film in society in two documentary films:

- Voice of the Multitude (1987) looked at the role that popular choirs had played in defining the national soundtrack.
- In the Seventh Sky (1991), more properly described as a training film, produced for Israel's Ministry of Education and Culture, offered a glimpse into how films are created by combining methods, tools, and human emotions to create an illusion of reality.

Rather than tackle literature the same way, Loevy chose instead to adapt major literary works to the medium of television. In each of these, the works themselves tackled major issues facing Israeli society. In these cases, Loevy saw himself as a conduit by which he could bring the work of leading Israeli authors and playwrights and the issues they tackled to a broader public.

- Winter Games (1988) was based on a story by Yitzhak Ben-Ner, adapted to the screen by Dita Guery (together with Meir Doron, Gilad Evron, and Ram Loevy, who had earlier collaborated on Bread). Ostensibly the story of the Jewish underground movement fighting against the British in Mandatory Palestine as seen from the perspective of a young boy, it is also a classic Bildungsroman about a boy transitioning into manhood with all the responsibilities that this entails. At the same time, however, it can also be seen as a metaphor for the State of Israel and its transition from youthful idealism of its founders' generation to the recognition of the stark realities facing a nation in its forties.
- Crowned (1989) tackles a similar theme, but from the perspective of the founding fathers. The film, based on a play by author Yaakov Shabtai (adapted by Ephraim Sidon and Ram Loevy), is an intense comedy based on the final days of the biblical King David. As his life approaches its end, he faces the most difficult task of his forty-year reign—giving up his crown to the next generation. Or perhaps he might even find a way to keep the crown for himself. The fact that this film was aired when Israel was itself forty years old was not lost on its audience.
- Butsche (1992), based on a play by Yosef Bar-Yosef (script by Gilad Evron) tackles the religious divide within Israeli society in much the same way that Bread tackled the socio-economic divide. It is the story of an ultra-Orthodox man who returns home to his family in the Mea Shearim neighborhood of Jerusalem after being expelled by his father twelve years earlier for committing adultery. A reviewer wrote of the film that "Levy [sic] undermines what the secular think they know about the haredim, what haredim perhaps think they know about the secular...."

One final film in this period was an original work scripted by Daniella Carmi. The Woman Who Stopped Eating (1991) is the story of a troubled scriptwriter who wants to write a feature film about a woman who stops eating. She turns to a film director who is also going through a crisis in his life, and together they begin to weave a story about this imaginary woman. The tension soon erupts, however, because the screenwriter wants to keep her story in the realm of the imaginary, while the director struggles to adopt a more realistic approach to the storyline. In some way, the story reflected the tensions marking Loevy's own career as both a documentarian and a dramatist.

== Israel Prize ==
In 1993, when Loevy was at work on a documentary, he received the news that he had been awarded the Israel Prize for his lifework. It was the most prestigious honor that the Israeli government awards to its citizens, given annually to people from a wide range of fields who have made a significant contribution to Israeli culture, the sciences, or the country in general. It was only the second time that the prize was awarded to an individual for his contributions to television (the other was Moti Kirschenbaum), though in 1985, the country's Arabic-language television broadcasts also received the award. According to the jury that awarded the prize,

"On the one hand, a prominent feature of his work in film is the desire to bring to a wider public of viewers an inner understanding and empathy for the way of life, the outlook on the world, and the motives that govern the actions of those known as "the fringe of society"—the homeless, the inhabitants of development towns, the Arabs, and the ultra-Orthodox.

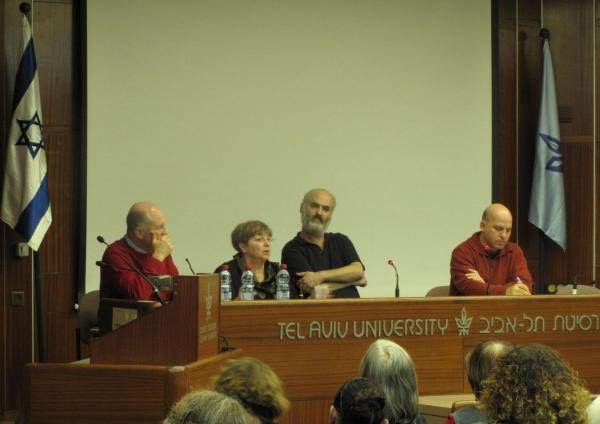
Loevy (left) at a symposium in Tel Aviv University at which he delivered a talk on The Film that Wasn't.

The newspaper Yediot Ahronot reported that, "Israel Prize Winner Making Film about the Secret Service's 'Torture Chambers.'" Loevy's project, The Film that Wasn't, was a two-part documentary on interrogation methods in Israel, both within the Green Line (Episode 1) and in the Occupied Territories (Episode 2). In 1987, an official commission headed by the former President of the Supreme Court Moshe Landau ruled that "moderate physical pressure" might sometimes be necessary as an interrogation tool. What the second episode really investigated was what was being defined as "moderate physical pressure." The two episodes were scheduled to be aired one week apart in October–November 1993.

While the first episode aired as planned, Kirschenbaum, then Director-General of the Israel Broadcasting Authority, was reluctant to screen the second episode until all three groups that interrogated prisoners—the police, the Shin Bet, and the military—responded to the allegations against them. Both the police and the Shin Bet did, but the IDF refused to respond to the charges of an anonymous young reservist, who claimed on camera to have been involved in the physical and mental abuse of prisoners. Even when it finally agreed to respond, it refused to ensure that the whistleblower's anonymity would be protected. The second episode finally aired almost eight months after the first, on 14 June 2004.

Some people claimed that Loevy should have been denied the Israel Prize. Others came to his defense, with one critic writing: "The Israeli establishment had no choice but to embrace Loevy and grant him the Israel Prize in 1993, but even this did not succeed in silencing his penetrating voice and lightening his uncompromising perspective on Israeli society."

This view was also echoed in the citation of the jury explaining why it selected Loevy:

"Equally worthy of special mention is his persistent struggle to show themes regarded as 'unacceptable,' though they touch on fundamental truths about Israeli society.... Given this context, his work is marked by boldness and at the same time a great sense of responsibility. Two films that he made [Barricades and Khirbet Khize] had their first television screening delayed.... In his struggle to bring these films before the viewer despite the fact that they treated controversial topics—a struggle which more than once led to the impugning of his personal and professional credibility—Loevy proved that he was not merely a maker of documentary films but first and foremost an artist with a point of view which he strives to bring before the viewer for him to grapple with."

Over the next few years, Loevy was embarked on four major projects. The first of these was The Child Dreams (1994), an adaptation of a new play (1993) by noted Israeli playwright Hanoch Levin. The play itself was a remarkable achievement, inspired originally by the saga of the Saint Louis, but transformed over time into an "operatic" metaphor about death and the loss of faith in messianic redemption that transcends any historical setting. In the words of theater critic Michael Handelzaltz, "It is a moving play, evoking compassion and identification. It is shocking, farcical, warped, grotesque, and amazing."

This was followed by Loevy's adaptation of Mr. Mani, a best-selling epic saga by Israeli author A.B. Yehoshua, with a script by longtime collaborator Gilad Evron. The novel is based on five conversations that tell the story of five generations of a Turkish–Greek-Jewish family, but in a larger sense, it is the story of Jewish and Israeli identity over the past two centuries. Originally, Loevy was hesitant about adapting the book for television, and asked the author: "You already have a book. Why do you need a movie?"

In the book, five distinct "mono-dialogues", a term Loevy himself used in personal correspondence, are used to tell the story of the family to an assumed listening partner, who is neither seen nor heard. Each of these mono-dialogues is different, and given by different people in different languages or period-appropriate forms of Hebrew. Loevy captured this in the film, creating a new television vocabulary. The "mono-dialogue" technique eliminated the "fourth wall" taboo of television and film, according to which the audience absolves itself of traditional neutrality and assumes the role of a character in the story. In Loevy's own words, "Television demands text, but the television viewer is used to getting the complete text. Every question has an answer...." In Mr. Mani, the role of respondent is filled by the camera and, by extension, the audience itself. "As soon as the speaker turns to the camera—in other words, to the audience, speaking directly to it in a way that demands an answer, it is as if the speaker stepped out of the screen, almost like in Woody Allen's The Purple Rose of Cairo. The viewer is shaken up. The artificial nature of the situation itself in Mr. Mani screams its presence.". Like the characters in Luigi Pirandello's Six Characters in Search of an Author, the characters cease being the subjects of scrutiny by some external viewer. The external viewer, i.e., the audience, becomes a partner in dialogue with the actors and an active participant in the story.

Loevy later said that, "As the person responsible for the artistic aspect of the production, I was eulogized on one hand and derided on the other. Since it was first screened in 1996, Mr. Mani has won considerable acclaim for the way that it redefined the medium of television by transforming the viewer into an active participant. Mr. Mani was a critical success, and represented Israel at INPUT (the International Public Television Screening Conference) 1998.

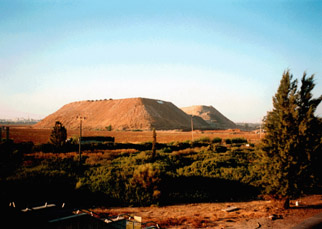
Life around Hiriya, a former garbage dump

In 1999, Loevy expanded his scope to tackle a new issue that was rising to the forefront of Israeli consciousness: environmentalism. Fourteen Footnotes to a Garbage Mountain was a documentary film about the Hiriya, once Israel's national garbage dump, on the outskirts of Tel Aviv. To Israelis, however, the Hiriya is more than a dumpsite. It is a physical landmark—a flat-topped mountain (87 m)—towering over the heavily urbanized coastal plain and the Ayalon River. Loevy succeeded in capturing the world of the Hiriya in its final days, as it was transformed from a dump to a recycling center and national park. He documented life around the site, and the art that sprouted up from its role—once mocked—as a national compost heap.

Loevy's next documentary film, Letters in the Wind (2001), was a tribute to noted Israeli actor Yossi Banai, one of the country's most noted performers and scion of a well-established theatrical family. Banai was particularly close to Nisim Aloni, whose plays featured prominently in Loevy's early films, and he was also close friends with Yaakov Shabtai (Crowned) and Hanoch Levin (The Child Dreams), two artists whose work Loevy also adapted for the screen. By making this film about Banai, it was as if Loevy had captured the artistic pulse of an entire generation that had dominated Israeli theater.

Banai, however, was also known as a singer, and his interpretations of the chansons of Jacques Brel and especially Georges Brassens in Hebrew (translated by Naomi Shemer) had endeared him to an even wider public. Banai's music featured prominently in the film, so that the pulse it captured turned into what one reviewer termed "a metronome of Yossi Banai's life."

== Three television dramas ==
Shortly before Letters in the Wind, Loevy directed a miniseries, Policeman (2000), based on a script by Galia Oz and Ofer Mashiach. In 1997, Loevy approached Moti Kirschenbaum with plans to direct a miniseries about a murder that took place in a fictional television station, Channel 66. Kirschenbaum approved of the project, but the following year Prime Minister Benjamin Netanyahu decided to replace Kirschenbaum with Uri Porat. Porat had previously served as Director-General of the Israel Broadcasting Authority from 1984 to 1989, and was Director-General when Loevy produced Bread. Porat, however, was also closely aligned with the rightwing of the Israeli political spectrum, and had even referred to one of Hanoch Levin's anti-militaristic early plays as "theatrash". The problem with Loevy's project, he claimed, was the plot and budgetary constraints.

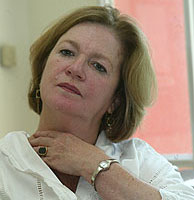
Batya Gur wrote the script for Murder in Television House.

Loevy denies that the script for Murder in Television House (2001) was a critique of Israeli public television. He had enlisted Batya Gur, a popular writer of detective fiction, to tell the story of a murder that took place in Channel 66, a fictional commercial television station. Some critics, however, considered the story to be a settling of accounts with Channel 1. The film revolves around several plot axes, one of which is the story of a veteran director who wants to make a film about the story "Ido and Einam" by the Nobel laureate Shmuel Yosef Agnon, but has the project rejected by the petty authorities who manage the station. The director decides to make the film anyway, but his girlfriend, the set designer is soon murdered, initiating a chain of murders at the station. Two factors adding to the complexity of the story is the fact that the murdered woman is also the ex-wife of the director's close friend, the station's senior programming manager, and the Agnon story that he is filming is also a story about a love triangle.

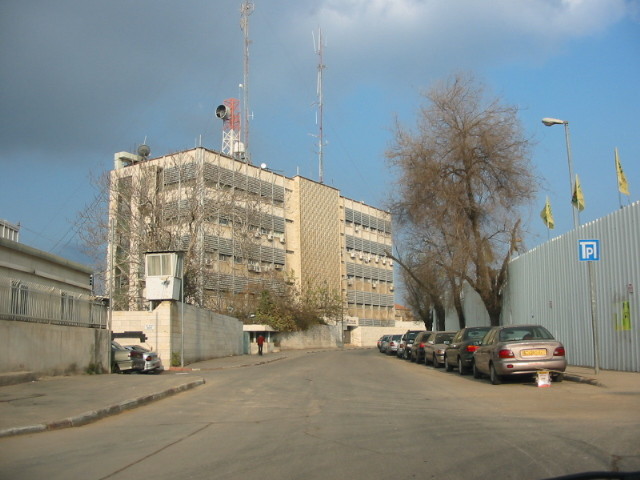
The background for Murder in Television House was eerily reminiscent of life behind the scenes at Israel's Channel 1.

When he rejected the film, Porat reportedly said, "People will think that there really are murders taking place here. In fact, the film opens with the line, "All of the events described in this film are fictional—except for one", leading the audience to wonder which one it is. That is not, however, the only reference to real events in Israeli television. The Hebrew name of the film, רצח, מצלמים (Retzach, metzalmim, literally, "Murder, we're filming"), is a play on the name of a popular TV show, שקט, מצלמים (Sheket, metzalmim, or "Quiet, we're filming"), and among the subplots are a news story about striking workers (a continuation of the story Loevy began in Bread) (other news stories being covered throughout the film include tensions between religious and secular, men and women, the unemployed and the wealthy, Arabs and Jews, and new immigrants—the detective investigating the murders is a Russian immigrant, who once served in the KGB and the FBI).

What makes the film most shocking, however, is the final discovery that the roots of the murder date back to an incident the Six Day War, when a group of Israeli soldiers massacred 52 Egyptian prisoners at Ras Sudar in the Sinai. Loevy later admitted that this was the one incident in the plot that was not fictional. It was based on an account he had heard from a participant in 1970, while he was serving in the reserves. He went on to report the incident to the military authorities and, in consequence, was removed from his unit. He had long wanted to make a film about the incident, but lacked the evidence to prove conclusively what had happened. Loevy later said:

"When the Six Day War ended, everyone thought that the 'mother of all wars' was over and we won. I was terrified and thought to myself, 'What would happen to our prisoners there if this story gets out?' Nevertheless, I feel that we must not be silent.... People say that these things happen in wartime and that there is loyalty to the army and loyalty among the troops, which causes these things to disappear beneath the carpet. But I believe that we are betraying our real responsibility, which is to take these skeletons out of the closet, even if we think that the enemy has more skeletons than us. We must not be silent. We are all part of this terrible conspiracy of silence, and it is eating us up inside."

When Porat refused to produce the story, Loevy resigned from Channel 1. It was the end of a 31-year relationship. Channel 2 bought the rights to the series and Loevy directed it for them. Nevertheless, Loevy insists, "I had no intention of settling accounts with Channel 1. I love them like family." But the underlying story behind Murder in Television House had haunted him almost since he began working at Israeli television. It was a story that he needed to tell, and it made no difference where he told it.

After then, Loevy made one more television drama, Skin (2005), written by Shoham Smith, about a former stripper who works in the Diamond Exchange District in Ramat Gan, gets involved in a murder. Throughout most of the decade, however, his work focused on documentary films.

== The 2000s ==
Over the remainder of the decade, Loevy directed seven documentary films:

- Close, Closed, Closure (also known as Gaza, L'enfermement, 2002) is a chilling account of life in the Gaza Strip, a place that Loevy describes as "a prison with one million inmates." An Israeli-French coproduction, it was one of very few Israeli films screened in the Arab world, airing on SOREAD in Morocco and on three separate occasions on Al Arabiya television in the United Arab Emirates.
- Genifa, Genifa (2003) is the story of an Israeli reserve unit that served during the Yom Kippur War.
- May I Hug You (2004) addresses the issue of homelessness through the story of a theater company that is producing a play about the phenomenon.
- Sakhnin, My Life (2006), also an Israeli-French coproduction, is a sports story about the Bnei Sakhnin football club from the Arab town of Sakhnin, the first team from an Arab town to win the State Cup in football, Israel's most popular sport.

Djembe Pattern
Djembe pattern

- Enter the Devil Drummer (2007) is an account of a group of young Israelis that travels to a small village in Mali to learn to play the djembe, and ends up learning more about themselves.
- Barks (2007) is, ostensibly, the story of Israel as seen through the eyes of its dogs, though it is more about its owners than the pets themselves. Loevy explained that the inspiration for the film was the dog Dooby that he grew up with as a child, and a scene he once witnessed in an affluent neighborhood in Tel Aviv. It was there that he first encountered a dog with an electric collar, which would deliver a shock every time the animal barked. Though this never appears in the film, the incident eventually made him think about how Israelis are usually so kind to their dogs, even though they can act so cruelly to others. "The film is about Israeli society", he said, "about our racism."
- In The Games They Play (2009) Loevy returns to the world of sport to document an international student basketball tournament that endeavors to promote peace between nations.

In 2007, Loevy also served as producer for the film The Woman From The Bubble about a young woman who translates sign language. It was an emotional project for Ram Loevy, not least because the film's director, Netta Loevy, was his daughter.

Loey's first full length film, The Dead of Jaffa, was written by his longtime collaborator Gilad Evron and produced by director-producer Eran Riklis. It is an intimate look at Arab life in the city of Jaffa both in 1947 and today. In an interview, Loevy said: "'I want to make a film for the big screen, but I am also afraid, because television is so human. It has human dimensions. It's there in the living room. Film has a mythical dimension to it. Its characters are distant gods, larger than life."

== See also ==
- List of Israel Prize recipients
