= Alex Auswaks =

Israeli crime fiction author

Alex Auswaks (Hebrew: אלכס אוסוואקס) was a Jerusalem-based writer of crime fiction. He was born in Tianjin, China on 6 February 1934. Though his work is primarily in shorter crime fiction, his novel "A Trick of Diamonds" was featured by Collins Crime Club in 1981. The book was shortlisted that year for the 'British Crime Writers Association 'John Creasy Award' in the 'Debut Dagger' category.

From 1990 to 1995, Auswaks edited and wrote for the publication of the 'Tientsin Society', for the community of Russian-exiled Jews who lived in that Chinese city during the Second World War.

Between 1989 and 1995, Auswaks contributed a weekly column reviewing crime fiction to The Jerusalem Post

His articles on the Russian poet Osip Mandelstam and on the Israeli detective-fiction writer Batya Gur appear in Jewish Writers of the Twentieth Century (Routledge 2003).

He died in Jerusalem on 7 April 2013, and is buried in Givat Shaul Cemetery.
