= Ras Sedr massacre =

Mass murder of dozens of Egyptian prisoners of war

Coordinates: 29°35′30″N 32°42′20″E

- Part of the Six-Day War
- Location: Ras Sedr, Egypt
- Date: 8 June 1967
- Attack type: Massacre, mass murder
- Deaths: 49–52+ Egyptian prisoners of war
- Perpetrator: Israel Defense Forces

Ras Sedr massacre (Hebrew: טבח ראס סודר; Arabic: مجزرة رأس سدر) was a mass murder of at least 52 Egyptian prisoners of war that took place immediately after a paratrooper unit of the Israel Defense Forces conquered Ras Sedr in the Sinai Peninsula on 8 June 1967 during the Six-Day War.

== Events ==
In June 2000, Egypt's Al-Wafd newspaper reported that a mass grave was discovered in Ras Sedr, containing remains of 52 prisoners killed by Israeli paratroopers during the war, who had killed the surrendered unit. The report said that some skulls had bullet holes in them, indicating execution. Initial reports in Israeli newspaper Haaretz were censored.

In April 2009, Haaretz reported that Israeli television director Ram Loevy had heard about the massacre shortly after the war, from fellow paratroopers in his unit. After testifying in Metzah, he was removed from the unit. Another claim detailed two cases of killings at the location, which happened in 1956 and 1967, respectively. A report has detailed confessions of Israeli officers who witnessed the act and this included an admission that the Red Sedr massacre was one of the three collective massacres perpetrated under the direction of Brigadier-General in reserve, Arieh Biroh (also Arye Biro), during the Suez Crisis of 1956 and the Six-Day War of 1967. The other two included the killings at the quarry near the Mitla Pass in Sinai and the killing of escaping Egyptian officers by the 890 regiment at Sharm El-Sheikh.

After his retirement, Biroh admitted to killing 49 Egyptian prisoners of war in the Sinai in interviews.

== Nearby events on the same day ==
=== El Arish ===
According to the Egyptian Organization for Human Rights, the Israeli Defense Forces had massacred hundreds of Egyptian prisoners of war or wounded soldiers in the Sinai peninsula, earlier in the day. Survivors alleged later that about 400 wounded Egyptians were buried alive outside the captured El Arish International Airport, and that 150 prisoners in the mountains of the Sinai were run over by Israeli tanks.

== Legacy ==
It has been suggested that the massacre may have fed into the retaliatory killing of dozens of Israeli prisoners by Egyptian forces in the 1973 Yom Kippur War. Remains of bodies wearing IDF uniform with POW tags were found in the ruins of the Bar Lev Line.

Batya Gur's literary crime novel, "Murder in Jerusalem", uses the suppressed memory of the Ras Sedr massacre as the foundation of her plot, which was elaborated in collaboration with Ram Loevy.

== See also ==
- Gaza Strip mass graves
- USS Liberty incident
- Israeli war crimes
- Targeted killing by Israel
- Extrajudicial killings in Israel
- Egypt–Israel relations
