= Daniella Carmi =

Israeli writer

Daniella Carmi (Hebrew: דניאלה כרמי; born on September 1, 1941) is an Israeli novelist who writes in Hebrew and French. She writes drama, screenplays and books for adults, children and youth. Her books were translated ion many languages.

She was born it Tel Aviv to a family of French speaking Polish-born Jewish parents, Ruth and Adam Kotov, who came to Israel in the 1930s. It her youth her mother was a communist. Her father was a member of the Hashomer Hatzair. Before coming to Israel the family lived in Belgium, France, and Algeria.

She earned degrees in philosophy and communication at the Hebrew University of Jerusalem. She began writing in 1978, which was a TV script on a suggestion from Ram Loevy, a dramatization of the novella Khirbet Khize (חרבת חיזעה) by S. Yizhar.

Most of her novels are tied to the Israeli-Palestinian conflict.

She was married to Menachem Carmi (divorced) and they had two daughters and son.

== Novels ==
- 1985: The Explosion on Ahalan Street
  A story about Natasha, a 12-year-old girl, the daughter of an Arab father and a Jewish mother. Her father has been arrested on suspicion of planting an explosive device in the neighborhood grocery store.
- 1994: Samir and Yonatan on Mars
  English translation by Yael Lotan: Samir and Yonatan (2000)
- 1996: To Be the Daughter of a Gypsy (להיות בתו של צועני) (ages: 10–14), German Munich, Hanser, 1998 Dutch Baarn, Fontein, 2002 French Paris, Gallimard, 2003 Italian Milan, Mondadori, 2004
  About the friendship of two Israeli girls from an institution for "problem girls" and a young Palestinian man. One of the girls is adopted by a Gazan father and through him she gets familiar with the life of "gypsies" - Palestinians without homeland (from book cover)
- 2017: La famille Yassine et Lucy dans les cieux [The Yassine Family and Lucy in the Skies] (in French)
  Nadia and Salim Yassine, a Palestinian couple from Israel, cannot have children. They adopt a child, Nathanaël, who turned out to be autistic. The title is a hint to the song of the Beatles, "Lucy in the Sky with Diamonds", referring to the plot line when they overhear the boy humming in English the song about strawberries and they finally find out the song was "Strawberry Fields Forever" of the Beatles. When they let the boy listen the song, he speaks for the first time.
- 2002: דניאלה כרמי
  Four women hospitalized in Room Seven of a psychiatric institution are joined by Zohra after her suicide attempt.
- 2020: "זית הזהב של הקוקטייל הציוני" [Golden Olive of the Zionist Idea]
  A collection of short stories about women trying to change their lives (and lives of thers) in the troubled area of Israel/Palestine

== Awards ==
- Samir and Yonatan on Mars was awarded:
  - 1997: Honorable Mention from UNESCO for Children and Young People's Literature in the Service of Tolerance
  - 1997: Berlin Prize for Best Children's Book in Translation
  - 1997: Silver Quill Award (Germany)
  - 2001: Arthur A. Levine/Scholastic Press publisher received Mildred L. Batchelder Award for Best Translated Book by the American Library Association (for Samir and Jonathan)
  - 2003: WIZO Prize, Italy
  - 1999:Prime Minister's Prize for Hebrew Literary Works for חיי הלילה של קליאו (Haye ha-Lailah shel Kle'o); Cl;eo's Night Life)
- ACUM Prize (2002)
- 2022 Shulamit Aloni Prize for The Golden Olive of the Zionist Idea
