= Barricades (film) =

- מיתרסים
- Written by: Ram Loevy
- Directed by: Ram Loevy
- Starring: Mahmoud Habibullah (interviewer)
- Country of origin: Israel
- Original languages: Arabic; Hebrew

Production
- Producer: Mahmoud Abu-Bakr
- Cinematography: Micha Pan
- Editor: David Milstein
- Running time: 65 min.

Original release
- Release: 1 August 1972

Barricades (Hebrew: מיתרסים, Mitrasim) was one of the first documentary films created for Israeli television. It tells the story of two families, one Jewish and the other Palestinian, who both lost children during the 1948 Arab-Israeli War, known to Palestinians as the 1948 Palestinian expulsion and flight, the Naqba, or "Catastrophe." The film, directed by Ram Loevy, caused considerable controversy when it aired on 1 August 1972. It was the first time that an Arab viewer had a chance through an Israeli film to experience the emotional significance of the Holocaust for Jews, and it was also the first time that Israeli Jews had an opportunity to experience the emotional significance of the Naqba to the Palestinian people.

Loevy first came up with the idea behind the documentary in 1968, while studying film in London. As a Hebrew-language broadcaster for the BBC, he had proposed creating a documentary about the social rifts tearing at Israeli society, with one episode focusing on the conflict between Jews and Palestinians. Although the BBC expressed interest in the project, Loevy returned to Israel soon after to help launch Channel 1, the country's first attempt at television broadcasting. He did not, however, abandon the idea, albeit in a more reduced format. Back in Israel, Loevy pitched the idea to the Israel Broadcasting Authority, which agreed to fund the project. At the time, Professor Eliyahu Katz, one of the founders of Israeli television, explained that the idea fulfilled one of the major purposes for which television was brought to Israel: to strengthen ties between the Jewish and Arab residents of the country. Loevy made the film in 1969.

The plotline focused on two families: the Shevat family of Haifa, which had lost two sons in battle during the War of Independence, and the family of Hussein Abu-Muhammad Yehia of the Jalazoon refugee camp near Ramallah, who lost two sons when the family fled from their ancestral home in the town of Ramla. For over two decades, the families had been trapped in the past, still mourning their two sons. Though Israel was then living in the shadow of the Six-Day War, Loevy made a conscious decision to base his story on 1948, explaining, "We focused on that year in order to push the testimonies back into the past. The two families in the film never meet; instead, a visit to the graves and a visit to the ruins of the Arab village are juxtaposed.

By the time the film was finished, however, Israel was engaged in a brutal War of Attrition with its neighbors, and several new Palestinian guerrilla factions were taking up the armed struggle against Israel as a means of achieving self-determination. Focusing on the tragedy of the Palestinian people would, it was believed, only incite further violence. The film was shelved for three years, and only aired on 1 August 1972. The decision to finally air Barricades was made by Yeshayahu Tadmor, who had recently been appointed by the government to head Israeli television. In an interview with the Israeli newspaper Yediot Ahronot he said that if the War of Attrition had still been raging, he would not have screened it either.

Yet even Tadmor's decision's was guarded. He agreed to screen Barricades, but only as part of a popular talk show, The Third Hour, so that the content could be discussed by a panel of "experts," which would ideally include both Arabs and Jews. Only Jews participated, however. One Arab guest, Muhammad Ali Ja'abari, mayor of Hebron and a Jordanian parliamentarian, refused to participate. At the same time, Israel's Foreign Minister Abba Eban refused to appear with a second guest, Anwar Nusseibeh, former Jordanian defense minister and governor of Jerusalem. In the end, none of them participated, and the Director General of the IBA Shmuel Almog decided not to replace them.

An editorial published in the newspaper Maariv two days after Barricades was aired noted that in the end, the ensuing discussion was unbalanced. Not only did the film fail to present the Palestinian side of the issue, but the remaining guests were either politicians or people known for their political positions. It added that whereas Loevy had succeeded in depicting an emotional portrait of two families' personal tragedies, the guests focused on the political issues while engaging in a game of political one-upmanship with the absent representatives of the Palestinians. "It would have been better," wrote the author, "if intellectuals, whose conscious is plagued by the problems inherent in our relationship with the Arabs, had participated."

Despite the politicization of Barricades, the film challenged pre-existing notions about Palestinian refugees then prevalent in Israeli society and led many people, however briefly, to reconsider their attitudes toward the Palestinian right of return. The debate surrounding the screening of the film also presaged the tension surrounding Loevy's 1978 film Khirbet Khizeh.
