= Close, Closed, Closure =

2002 television film

- Najwa Sultan
- Written by: Ram Loevy
- Directed by: Ram Loevy
- Starring: Fadl and Najwa Sultan; Muhammad Sultan
- Theme music composer: Eran Dinur
- Countries of origin: Israel; France
- Original languages: Arabic; Hebrew

Production
- Producers: Esther Hoffenberg (Lapsus, France); Ram Loevy
- Cinematography: Gadi Afrait; Naguib Abu el-Gbein
- Editor: Danny Shik
- Running time: 53 minutes

Original release
- Network: Channel 8
- Release: 5 August 2002

Close, Closed, Closure (סגר) is a documentary film by Ram Loevy that aired on Israel's Channel 8 on 5 August 2002. The film describes life in the occupied Gaza Strip, three years before Israel unilaterally disengaged from there in 2005. The film employed both Israeli and Palestinian film crews to tell the story behind the intense frustrations of the local population, which erupted in the Second Intifada and the 2008-2009 Gaza War. At the same time, it also presents the attitudes of two conflicting groups in Israel: the rightwing settlers, who express their contempt for the local population; and the leftwing peace camp that demanded an Israeli withdrawal. The title derives from the frequent closures of Gaza by the Israeli government—during the filming, the border between Israel and Gaza was closed, opened, and closed again.

== Protagonists ==
In Close, Closed, Closure Loevy makes no secret of the political agenda underlying his film. He describes Gaza as "a prison with one million inmates" that is "dependent on its ties with Israel—its enemy." Toward that end, the Palestinian side is told mainly through series of interviews with the family of Fadl and Najwa Sultan of Beit Lahia, whose son Muhammad lost both his legs because soldiers at the border crossing prevented them from getting him to an East Jerusalem hospital on time.

The family is consistently articulate, even when the mother refuses to speak with Loevy at their last scheduled interview: Complaining that the Israeli left has abandoned the people of Gaza, she says: "You've all become fanatics, so we no longer believe in peace." Though she knows that Loevy is opposed to occupation she cannot bring herself to ignore his association with the occupiers, saying: "I'm not sure you should be in our house now. I don't know that I can talk to you anymore." Nevertheless, toward the end of film she reconciles with Loevy and even apologizes to him. She has come to look past his identity as an Israeli and an occupier, and see him as a human being.

This attitude contrasts sharply with that of a settler and self-described educator, Gideon Bashan, who tells Loevy: "A rooster, even if he climbs on top of a fence and shouts, 'I'm a human being!' still remains a rooster.'" Nevertheless, as one reviewer points out: "The settlers and Palestinians do share some common ground: Each demonizes the other. All see themselves as unique victims. And everyone, of course, has rock-headed faith in divine intervention."

== Style ==
The notion of looking beyond the politicized symbolism of the visual to capture its essence is integral to this film. Loevy himself, in his role as narrator, wonders: "In this never-ending conflict, where the spilled blood makes every stone a symbol—where every image is fraught with meaning—is it possible to see and hear things as they are?" In a later essay, he elaborated on this, claiming that once an object appears on screen it loses its material existence, erasing the layers of blood and enmity that envelop it in the real world, and allowing the viewer to see things as they are: a jeep is a jeep; a tree is a tree; a man is a human being. He recognizes that the scenes he has sometimes deteriorate to banal depictions of a thorny dispute, but defends this with the argument that "clichés often become reality in times of conflict".

In a much wider sense, Loevy seems to be saying that documentary film has the cathartic effect of purging objects of their partisan interpretations to get to the crux of the subject under investigation. This parallels Bill Nichols's interpretation of documentary realism as "join[ing] together objective representation of the historical world and rhetorical overtness to convey an argument about the world." On the other hand, Loevy seemingly reject Nichols's conclusion that documentary realism should result in "a personal point of view about the historical world." By incorporating historical footage with its own innate biases, as well as his own "dryly embittered" musings in the narration, he replaces the idea of presenting a coherent "argument" with a cacophony of voices each vying against the other in an echo of the Palestinian-Israeli conflict itself.

== Screenings ==
In addition to several screenings in Israel, the film also aired on television through much of the Francophonie, including France (France 5), Belgium, Switzerland, and Canada. Unlike most Israeli productions, however, it also received attention in the Arab world, airing on SOREAD in Morocco and on three separate occasions on Al Arabiya television in the United Arab Emirates.

== See also ==
- List of Palestinian films
