= The Animated Haggadah =

- Directed by: Rony Oren
- Production company: Scopus Films
- Release date: 1985
- Running time: 25 minutes
- Language: English

The Animated Haggadah is a 1985 passover claymation film directed by Rony Oren and produced by Scopus Films.

== Synopsis ==
As Danny and his family are doing a Passover Seder, he imagines his family in Egypt, reliving the events of Moses freeing the Hebrews from slavery, and from the hands of Pharaoh and his magicians.
