= Days of Ziklag =

Book by S. Yizhar

- Hebrew cover
- Author: S. Yizhar
- Original title: 'ימי צקלג'
- Language: Hebrew
- Genre: Modernist, Historical novel, War novel
- Publisher: Zmore-Bitan
- Publication date: 1958
- Publication place: Israel
- English publication date: N/A
- Pages: 1,156 pp

Days of Ziklag (Hebrew: ימי צקלג, Yemei Tziklag) is a novel by S. Yizhar, first published in 1958. It is widely considered to be one of the most prominent works in Israeli literature.

The novel describes 48 days during the 1947–1949 Palestine war in which it follows a squad of IDF soldiers trying to hold a post in the Negev desert, including the Battle of Khirbet Mahaz. The story's stream of consciousness focuses on the inner worlds of the soldiers, both during and between battles. The story is based on the real-life battle for Horbat Ma'achaz fought by the Yiftach Brigade in October 1948, although the battle is never mentioned by name.

Yizhar received the Israel Prize in 1959 for his novel.
