= Dror Green =

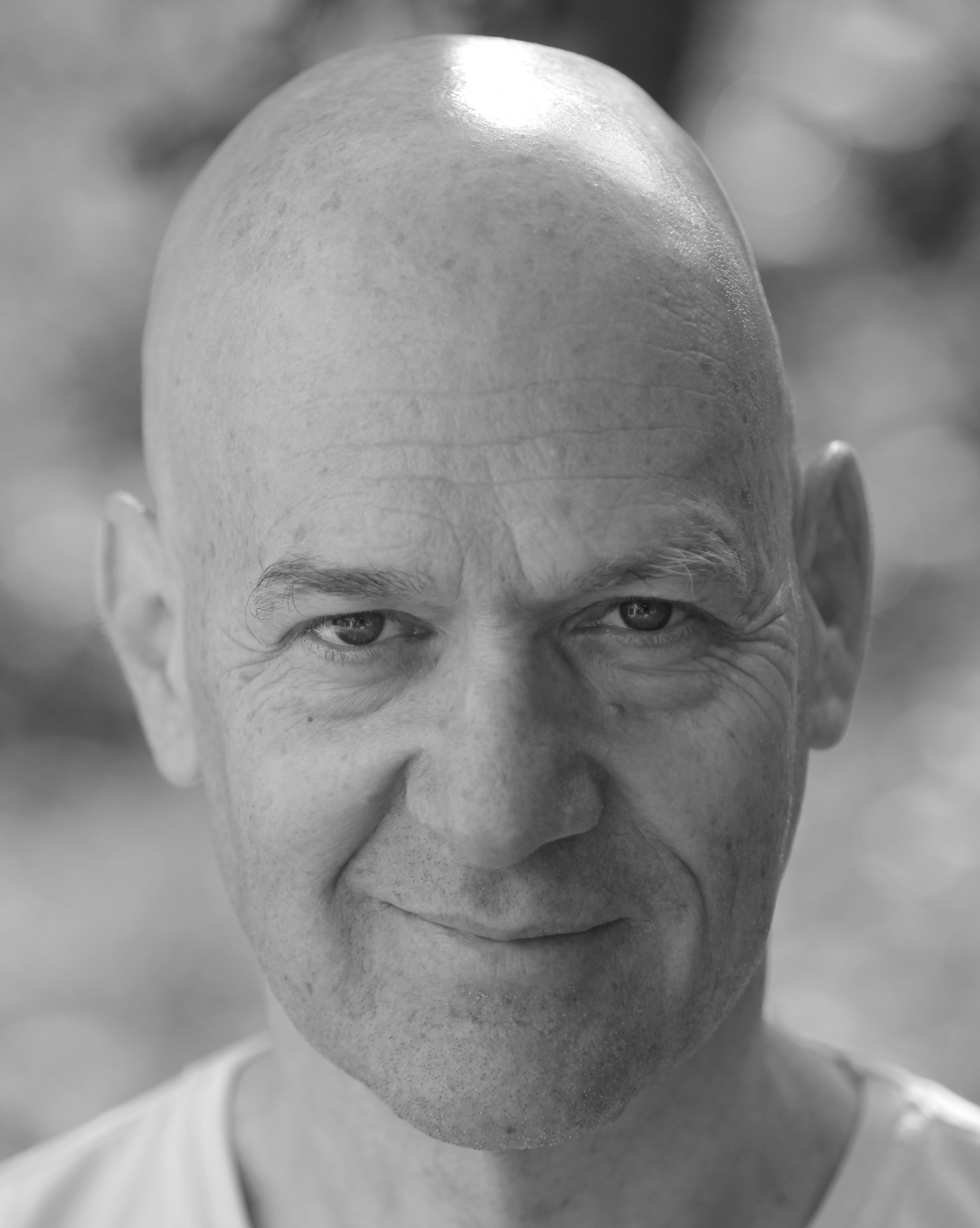
Aug. 2012

Dror Green (Hebrew: דרור גרין; born 1954) is a psychotherapist and author. He developed the methods of Emotional Training and Emotional Thinking, based on his concept of human nature. Although he was descended from a family that had lived in Israel for ten generations, he did not identify with Zionism, as he writes in the introduction to his book, ABC of Israeli Apartheid.

== Biography ==
Green was born in Jerusalem in 1954. As a thirteen-year-old boy he witnessed Israeli soldiers destroying a Palestinian neighborhood near the Western Wall in the old city of Jerusalem. As a soldier in the war of 1973 between Israel, Syria and Egypt, he witnessed the Israeli army destroying villages before withdrawing from occupied Syrian territory. He was wounded in the war and suffered from PTSD, and the experience of trauma and war crimes influenced his personal and professional life, as described in his Back to Crew No. 4.

He holds an MA and PhD in psychotherapy (Regent's College, City University, London). He studied music composition with Mark Kopytman at the Rubin Academy of Music and Dance in Jerusalem, and at the same time finished his BA in musicology and philosophy in the Hebrew University of Jerusalem. He was the director of the 'Jerusalem Design Workshop' and the CEO of 'Israeli Music Publication'. He edited a poetry periodical, and worked as an art curator. Later he founded 'Books, Publishers', and published the first Hebrew translation of Freud's case studies and books by Israeli psychologists and poets, including the last book of the poet Yona Wallach.

He wrote about 20 children's books, some of which became bestsellers for many years. His prose was also published by the major Israeli publishers, but when he started to write about the occupation, the reaction was less positive. The distribution of the Arabic translation of his book, The Intifada Tales, in the occupied territories was forbidden by the army, and the main bookstore chain refused to sell the book. Later, his books ABC of Israeli Apartheid and The Vision of Dual Nationality were denounced by the Israeli media.

He invented TRIXXY, a mind game, that was sold worldwide and enabled him to move to London in 1995 and finish his MA in psychotherapy at Regent's College, City University London. He is a member of the UKCP. In 1998 he came back to Israel]. He gave lectures to professionals and to the public about his new concepts of psychotherapy, taught and supervised therapists, clinical psychologists, psychiatrists and family doctors in various schools of psychotherapy. He founded Cogito School of Psychotherapy, published some books for professionals and for the public and edited the first Hebrew edition of Freud's case studies. In 2005 he finished his PhD in psychotherapy.

In 2008 he left Israel and moved with his family to a small village near the town of Kyustendil in Bulgaria, where he founded the 'Institute of Emotional Training' and the 'Academy of Thought'. His book, Emotional Training, was published in Hebrew and English in 2011. In his book he presents his new method, based on a new concept of human nature that does not separate between body and mind, that enables us to identify and improve our inborn emotional skills.

== Psychotherapy ==
Green presents a new perspective, sometimes provocative, of psychotherapy. His experience in various schools of psychotherapy (integrative psychotherapy, existential psychotherapy, humanistic psychotherapy and communicative psychotherapy enabled him to review the many theoretical assumptions and question what he considers the mystic assumptions concerning the vague definition of the 'mind'. In his books Freud versus Dora and the Transparent Model of Case Studies and Another View of Psychotherapy he expresses doubts about the basic assumptions regarding 'therapy' or 'healing'. In his book Psychotherapy, Consumers' Guide he alerts readers to what he considers the dangers of psychotherapy. In his book Emotional Training, he presents a new method that he asserts will help everyone create a sense of a safe place in their lives without being dependent on psychotherapists.

=== Case studies ===
His MA thesis was dedicated to Freud's seminal case study of Dora (Ida Bauer), which he considered Freud's 'working model', that influenced his work even before meeting his clients ('patients'), a model that still influences the work of many therapists. He continued to research Freud's writings, edited the first Hebrew translation of the case studies and taught a seminar about Freud's case studies. He also prepared a course for therapists, focusing on the writing of case studies, which he taught in schools of psychotherapy. His approach to writing case studies is presented in the book Another View of Psychotherapy.

=== Therapeutic relationship ===
Green follows Robert Langs, who broadened the ground rules of psychoanalysis to apply the whole field of psychotherapy. Green's work shows the common denomination of all approaches to psychotherapy, although they are based on different and sometimes contradicted theoretical assumptions. The precise definition of the therapeutic ground rules provides all therapists with practical tools of creating a therapeutic safe place ('secure frame'), which is vital to any therapeutic process.

=== Online therapy ===
Green is one of the pioneers in online therapy, having written his doctoral thesis on the subject In this research he reviewed hundreds of online therapy websites and defined the conditions for creating therapeutic relationships in the new therapeutic setting. Since 1999 he has been doing online therapy and researching this field. He developed the online clinic www.psychom.com that integrates all means of online communication in a secured therapeutic space. The clinic has the merit of providing a full documentation of the therapeutic process, that enables more objective research into this process. It also prevents therapists from abusing clients and creates a more equal relationship. Green uses that website both to meet his clients, and to train and supervise online therapists.

=== Emotional Training ===
Green's book, Emotional Training, the Art of Creating a Sense of a Safe Place In a Changing World, was published in 2011. It presents his method 'Emotional Training', based on his concept of human nature, that does not separate between body and mind. He considers this not 'therapy,' but a way of life, based on daily practice of emotional skills to create the sense of a safe place, which he considers the main motive of human beings. In the Institute of Emotional Training in Bulgaria (www.emotional-training.com) Green conducts seminars for couples, parents, therapists and directors, and also trains people in his method. He has developed a program for supporting PTSD victims, based on his personal experience of coping with post-traumatic symptoms. He claims that emotional training is not only a practical method but also a new perspective of understanding human culture, art, religious, politics, thinking, research and interpersonal relationships.

== Writing and publishing ==
Green is the author of more than 50 books, including children's books (as author and illustrator), novels, stories, poetry, political writing and professional books on psychotherapy. As a publisher he published the books of Israeli poets such as Yona Wallach and psychologists such as Haim Omer and Nahi Alon, as well as Freud's Hebrew translations.

Although he is known in Israel as the author of many books, after moving to Bulgaria he stopped publishing new books, and his last book is available only on his website and for the Kindle. He publishes a weekly newsletter, and makes his books available for free in his websites libraries (in Hebrew).

=== Books in English ===
- Emotional Training, Institute of Emotional Training (2011)
- Emotional Training, Kindle (2012)
- ABC of Israeli Apartheid, Kindle (2012)
- Dialogues with the Little prince, Books, Publishers (2016)

=== Books in Hebrew ===
- The Intifada Tales, Palestinian legends. Books, Publishers (1989)
- The River of Love, poems. Modan Publishers (1990)
- His End, His Eternal Rest, His Death, novela. Schocken Books (1992)
- Crew No. 4, a novel.Keter Publishing House (1992)
- Cassiopeia's Dancing Party, stories. Books, Publishers (1993)
- Murder in the online clinic, a thriller. Books, Publishers (2004)
- ABC of Israeli Apartheid, the alphabet of Israeli racism. Books, Publishers (2005)
- The Vision of Dual Nationality, the utopia of the Israeli-Palestinian conflict. Books, Publishers (2005).
- The Vision of Dual Nationality, Books, Publishers (2005)
- Back to Crew No. 4, a novel. Books, Publishers (2006)

=== Psychotherapy ===
- Freud versus Dora and the transparend model of the case study, Modan Publishers (1998)
- Psychotherapy, consumers' guide, Books, Publishers (2003)
- Another View of Psychotherapy, Books, Publishers (2007)
- Emotional Training, the art of creating a sense of a safe place in a changing world, Books, Publishers, (2011)
- Freud's Case Studies, The Institute of Emotional Training (2014)
- A safe place, Books, Publishers (2015)

=== Children's books ===
- Plasticine Zoo, illustrated by Rony Oren, Steimatzky (1987)
- Plasticine Vegetables, illustrated by Rony Oren, Keter Publishing House (1987)
- Plasticine Zoo, illustrated by Rony Oren, Keter Publishing House (1987)
- Plasticine Zoo, illustrated by Rony Oren, Keter Publishing House (1987)
- The Golden Butterfly and the Butterflower, illustrated by Dror Green, Text by Giza Friedman-Grayevxky, Keter Publishing House (1987)
- ABC of Professions, illustrated by Michal Porat, Kinneret Zmora-Bitan Dvir (1987)
- ABC of Animals, text and photographs by Dror Green, Kinneret Zmora-Bitan Dvir (1987)
- ABC of Little Things, text and photographs by Dror Green, Kinneret Zmora-Bitan Dvir (1987)
- ABC of Vegetables and Fruits, text and photographs by Dror Green, Kinneret Zmora-Bitan Dvir (1987)
- I Play Chess, text and photographs by Dror Green, Modan Publishers (1988)
- I Collect Stamps, text and photographs by Dror Green, Modan Publishers (1988)
- I Collect Coins, text and photographs by Dror Green, The Israel Government Coins and Medals Corporation (1990)
- Graffity, text and photographs by Dror Green, Modan Publishers (1990)
- 13 Musical Legends, illustrations by Filippo Bonanni (1638–1723), Modan Publishers (1993)
- There is a City Under Jerusalem, text and illustrations by Dror Green, Modan Publishers (1993)
- How to Pick Elephants, text and illustrations by Dror Green, Books, Publishers (1993)
- Prof. Goldmind and the Brain Trust, Israel Ministry of Education (1994)
- TRIXXY, the puzzle book, Books, Publishers (1994)
- The Little Mind Reader, illustrated by Cristina Kadmon, Modan Publishers (1998)
- The Little Mind Reader and the Famous Detective, illustrated by Cristina Kadmon, Modan Publishers (1998)
- The Little Mind Reader and the Prince of Charm, illustrated by Cristina Kadmon, Modan Publishers (1998)
- The Little Mind Reader and Thin Eden, illustrated by Cristina Kadmon, Modan Publishers (1998)

=== Editing and translations ===
- Yona Wallach, Wild Light, editor: Dror Green, Books, Publishers (1983)
- Selly Elkayam, Poems, editor: Dror Green, Books, Publishers (1983)
- Gabriella Elisha, Another Music, editor: Dror Green, Books, Publishers (1983)
- Binyamin Shvily, Poems, editor: Dror Green, Books, Publishers (1988)
- Ilan Bosem, Poems, editor: Dror Green, Books, Publishers (1988)
- Moshe Zinger, translator, Classical Love Poems, Illustrated and edited by Dror Green, Books, Publishers (1988)
- The Bible, Selected Prose, edited by Dror Green, Books, Publishers (1993)
- Robert Nadler, text and illustration, The Kind and the Shadow, Translated and edited by Dror Green, Books, Publishers (1998)
- Sigmund Freud, The Wolf Man (translated by Eran Rolnik), edited and introduction by Dror Green, Modan Publishers (1999)
- Haim Omer, Parental Presence, edited and translated from English by Dror Green, Modan Publishers (2000)
- Sigmund Freud, Little Hans (translated by Miriam Ron), edited, introduction and essay by Dror Green, Modan Publishers (2003)
- Sigmund Freud and Joseph Breuer, Studies on Hysteria (translated by Miriam Kraus), edited and introduction by Dror Green, Modan Publishers (2004)
- Sigmund Freud, The Rat Man (translated by Miriam Kraus), edited, introduction and essay by Dror Green, Modan Publishers (2004)
- Haim Omer and Nahi Alon, Demonization in Personal Relations, edited by Dror Green, Books, Publishers (2005)
- Sigmund Freud, Schreber (translated by Miriam Kraus), edited, introduction and essay by Dror Green, Modan Publishers (2006)
- Frank Baum, The Magical Monarch of Mo, translated by Dror Green, Books, Publishers (2006)
- Ora Gavrieli, The Demon, the Nun and the Magical Child, edited by Dror Green, Books, Publishers (2006)
- Brurit Laub and Seymour Hoffman, Innovative Interventions in Psychotherapy, edited and introduction by Dror Green, Books, Publishers (2007)
- Haim Omer and Eli Lebowitz, Children's Fears, edited by Dror Green, Books, Publishers (2007)
- Yona Wallach, The Last Poems, editor: Dror Green, Books, Publishers (2007)
