= Mitla Pass =

Mountain range pass In the Sinai Peninsula of Egypt

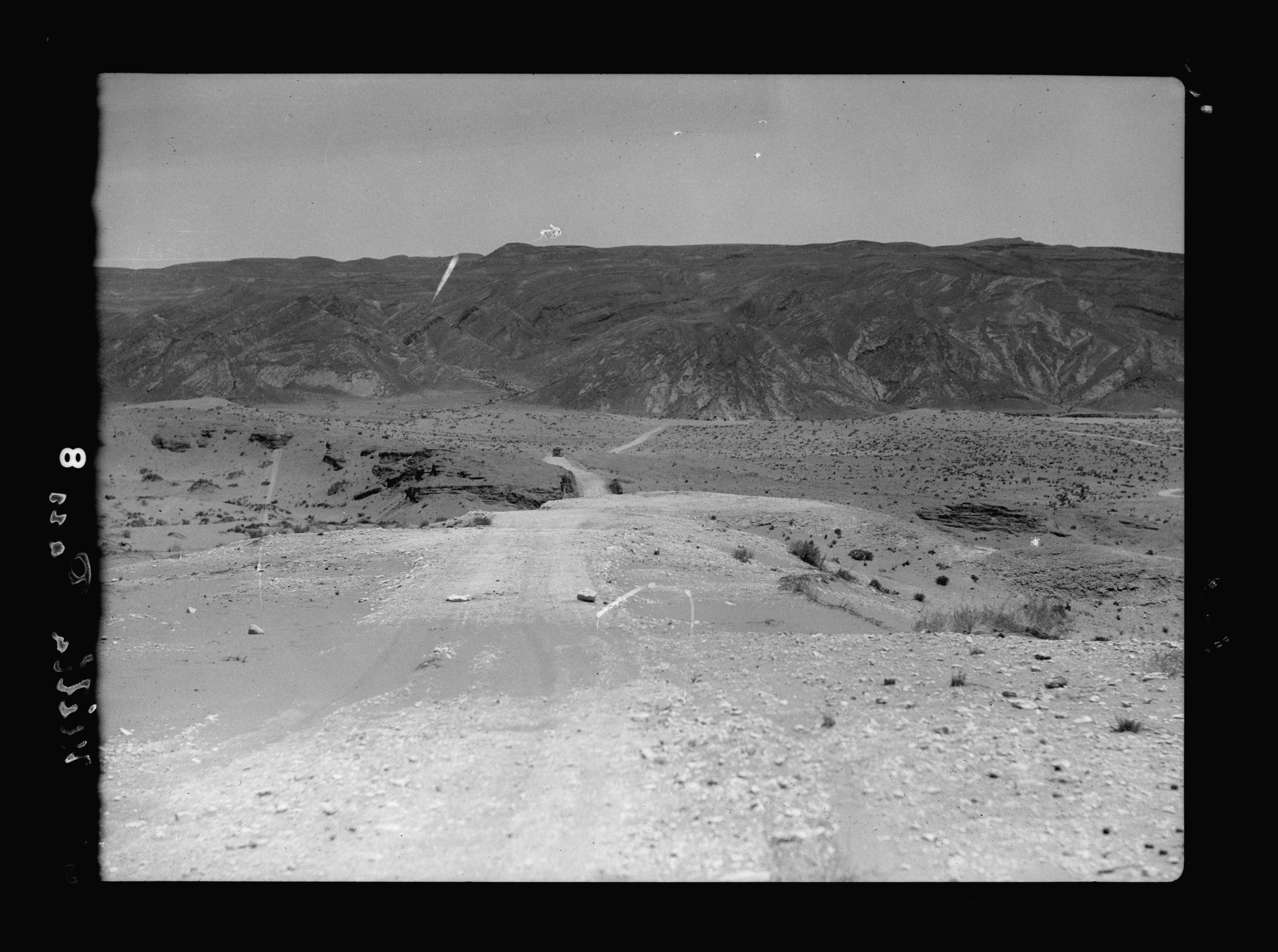
- The Mitla pass in 1920 looking east from the plain

- Location within Sinai
- Elevation: 480 m (1,570 ft)
- Traversed by: Route 50

Third Approach
- Location: Sinai
- Coordinates: 30°0′52.4″N 32°53′0.4″E

The Mitla Pass (Arabic: ممر متلة, Hebrew: מיתלה) is a 480-metre-high (1,570 ft) pass snaking 32 kilometres (20 mi) in the Sinai Peninsula of Egypt, wedged between mountain ranges to the north and south. It is located about 50 kilometres (31 mi) east of Suez. It is a monotonous ride through here and Nekhel, a wilderness that provides the shortest route between Nuweiba and Cairo. Buses carrying tourists to Mount Sinai, St. Catherine's Monastery, and Feiran Oasis travel through there.

== Wars between Israel and Egypt ==
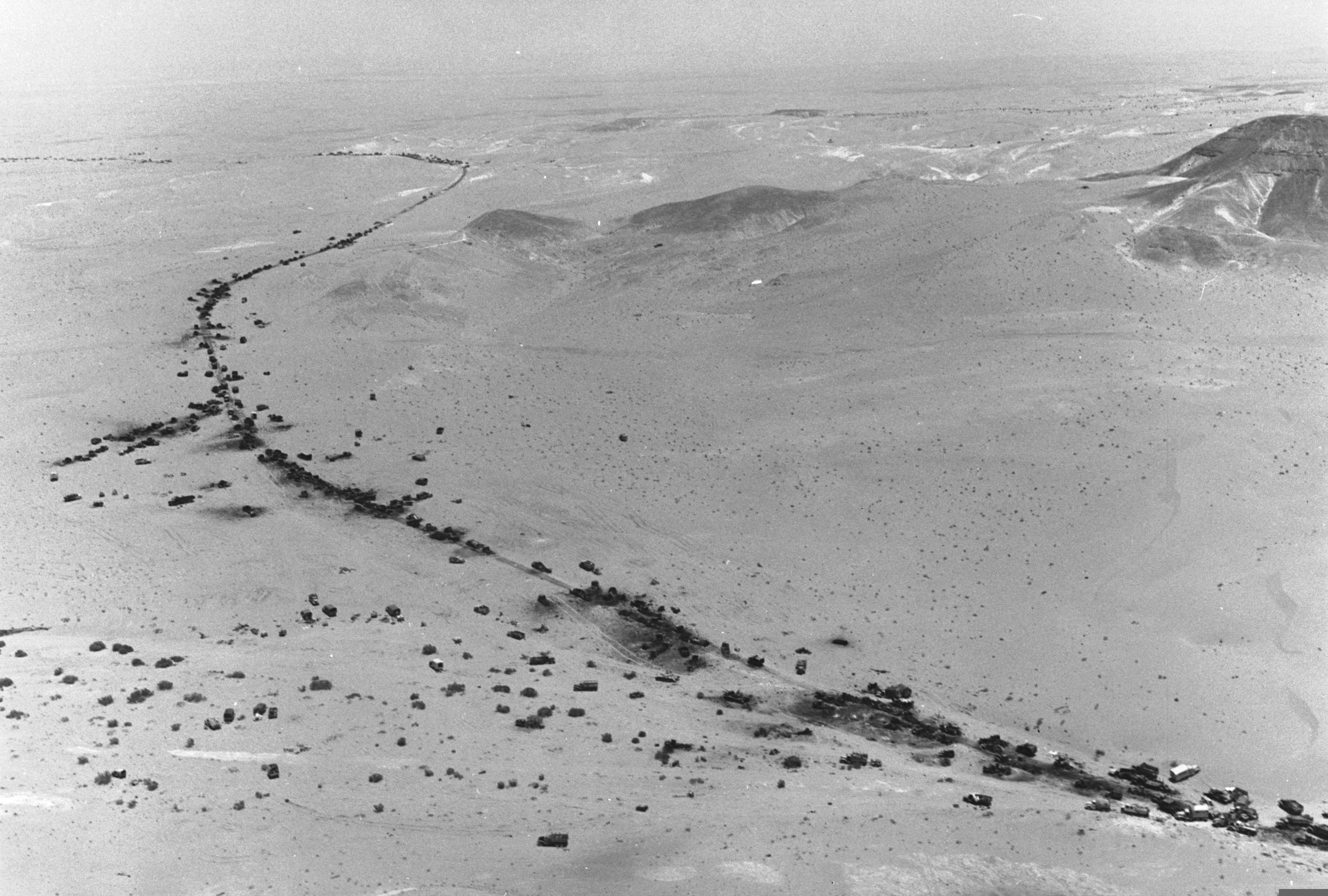
Aerial view of the road through Mitla Pass dotted with wrecked Egyptian vehicles and armour after Israeli air force attacks in June 1967.

Mitla Pass is a site of major battles between the militaries of Egypt and Israel during the wars of 1956, 1967, and 1973.

=== Mitla incident during the Suez War ===
During the Israeli invasion of Egypt in the Suez War of 1956 the pass was captured by the 202nd Brigade of the Israeli army, commanded by Ariel Sharon, without the approval of the Israeli leadership. Sharon faced elements of the Egyptian 2nd Brigade, which had prepared an ambush within the pass. Egyptians pinned down such famous Israelis as Mordechai Gur and Uri Dan under fire throughout the afternoon of October 31, 1956. Aharon Davidi and Rafael Eitan sent in two companies to clear Egyptians from both sides of the pass between 6:00 p.m. and 9:00 p.m. that evening. The Israelis suffered 40 casualties and about 120 wounded, while the Egyptians suffered 260 casualties. Sharon was criticized for this.

=== Yom Kippur War ===
During the Yom Kippur War, on October 14, 1973, the Egyptians tried to reach the pass with elements of their Fourth Armored Division, but their offensive was halted by IDF armor and air power. Figures of Egyptian tank losses vary with the source consulted. The Two O'Clock War gives the Israeli figure but the Egyptian one is lower.

== See also ==
- Ariel Sharon: Mitla incident
- Ras Sedr massacre
