= Rony Oren =

Israeli animator, claymator and academic (born 1953)

Rony Oren (Hebrew: רוני אורן; born on February 25, 1953) is an Israeli animator, claymator and academic. In the commercial world he is best known for more than 500 animated short films in clay and over 30 children books which he writes and illustrates.

== Career ==
Oren was born in Haifa, Israel on February 25, 1953. He planned to be a biologist, and got into animation as a part-time job when he began making animated films for Channel 1 in the early 1970s. When he tried making an animated film with clay, he knew that he had found his material. From his independent studio Frame by Frame, established in 1978, he directed and animated over 500 short films and television series. Based on plasticine figures, a number of his films have received international awards. Oren won the Nachum Gutman prize for illustration. Oren's short films were submitted by the Israeli Broadcasting Authority and selected for screening in the Radio and Television Museum in New York and Los Angeles.

Among the series that Oren produced were The Egg (25x25sec), Foxy Fables (13x7), Tales of a Wise King (26x6), and Grabbit the Rabbit (13x8). These series were broadcast in over 80 countries and on numerous networks including BBC, Channel 4, Disney Channel, CBS, ABC, ZDF, Channel 1, ieTV, and more. He also produced over 85 short films for Rechov Sumsum and Shalom Sesame (the Israeli versions of Sesame Street). Amongst the many television advertisements that Oren produced were one for Tene Noga in 1995, featuring talking cows, and another for Bezeq in 2001, featuring the well-known talking parrot. In 2009, he directed a team of three animators for the Clay Play series (13x4).

In addition to the Secrets of Clay book series for all ages, Oren wrote and illustrated over 30 books for children, published in Israel, Britain, France, Germany, Russia, Denmark, Italy, Greece and the United States. He illustrated The Animated Haggadah, which was published in 1985 and sold extensively all over the world.

== Published works ==
=== Illustrated and Wrote ===
- Rony's Clay Christmas (2012)
- The Nativity (2011)
- The Secrets of Clay 3: Dinosaurs (2010)
- The Secrets of Clay 2: Animals in the Wild (2006)
- Blue Bear Sweeter Than Honey (2006)
- Blue Bear Wants to Sleep (2007)
- Rony's Book of Colours (2006)
- The Book of Numbers (2006)
- The Secrets of Clay: Pets & Farm Animals (2005)

=== Illustrated ===
- Plasticine Zoo, by Dror Green, Steimatzky (1987).
- Plasticine Vegetables, by Dror Green, Keter Publishing House (1987).
- Plasticine Zoo, by Dror Green, Keter Publishing House (1987).
- Plasticine Zoo, by Dror Green, Keter Publishing House (1987).
- The Animated Haggadah, by Uri Shin'ar, Scopus Films (1985).

=== Animation ===
- Three Green Frogs (2003)
- Grabbit the Rabbit (1999)
- Happy Holidays (short film for Shalom Sesame, 1991)
- Pay Words (short film for Shalom Sesame, 1991)
- Here Is Your Life: Hanukkah (short film for Shalom Sesame, 1990)
- Tales of A Wise King (1989, 1993)
- Foxy Fables (1987)
- The Animated Haggadah (1985)
- Excuse Me (short film for Shalom Sesame, 1986)
- Wet Paint (short film for Shalom Sesame, 1986)
- The Egg (1979)
- In The Beginning (1976) (short film)

== Clay Ground brand ==
Rony's Clay Ground includes The Secrets of Clay how-to series, as well as a range of board books and story books, internationally broadcast short films and workshops. The Clay Ground philosophy is based on Oren's trademarked method of working with clay. All creatures, settings and scenes inhabiting Oren's clay world can be built from three key shapes: Ball, Sausage and Pancake. These shapes provide the platform for all his clay figures, in any combination of color and size. Rony Oren has introduced his philosophy and method to children and students around the world through countless workshops and master classes. His workshops take place all over the world in schools, design schools, universities, children's hospitals and festivals.

== Academic career ==
Oren is currently a Professor of Animation at Bezalel Academy of Art and Design in Jerusalem. Between the years 1980 - 2002 Oren taught animation at different art schools in Israel - Beit Tzvi, the WIZO Haifa Academy of Design and Education, and the Bezalel Academy of Art and Design. Oren also led art classes at different animation festivals. He leads stop motion master classes in various international art and film academies and festivals. Between 2000 and 2008 Oren served as Head of the Animation Department at the Bezalel Academy.
