= Noemi Smilansky =

Austro-Hungarian Empire-born Israeli painter (1916–2016)

- נעמי סמילנסקי
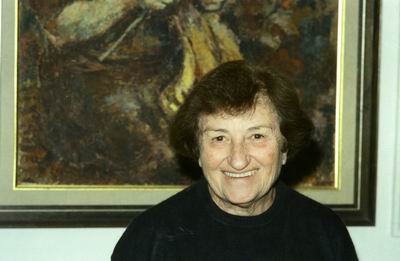
- Born: Noemi Wellman; December 22, 1916; Grand Duchy of Kraków, Austro-Hungarian Empire
- Died: March 13, 2016 (aged 99); Israel
- Other names: Naomi Wellman, Noʻomi Smilansḳi, Naomi Smilanski, Naomi Smilansky
- Spouse: S. Yizhar
- Children: 3

Noemi Smilansky (Hebrew: נעמי סמילנסקי; née Noemi Wellman; 1916 – 2016) was an Austro-Hungarian Empire-born Israeli painter, engraver, and illustrator. Her name is also spelled Naomi Smilanski, Noʻomi Smilanski, and Naomi Smilansky.

== Biography ==
Noemi Smilansky was born as Noemi Wellman on December 22, 1916, in Grand Duchy of Kraków (now Kraków), Austro-Hungarian Empire (now Poland). In 1924 during her childhood, she immigrated to Mandatory Palestine (now Israel). She married writer and politician, Yizhar Smilansky (S. Yizhar) in 1942. They had three children, including Ze'ev Smilansky.

Smilansky taught art classes at Ben Shemen Youth Village. One of her students was Eva Hoffe, the daughter of Esther Hoffe.

She died on March 13, 2016, in Israel, and is buried at Gderot Regional Cemetery in Central District, Israel. Her artwork can be found in the museum collections at the Museum of Modern Art, Amon Carter Museum of American Art, Madison Museum of Contemporary Art, the British Museum, the Israel Museum in Jerusalem, and the National Gallery of Art in Washington, D.C.

== See also ==
- List of Israeli women artists
