= 1972 in television =

The year 1972 involved some significant events in television. Below is a list of notable television-related events.

== Events ==
- January 3 – Show Boat is aired for the first time on network television in the United States, on NBC
- January 21 – The first convention of Star Trek fans is held in New York City's Statler-Hilton hotel
- Mid-February – John Lennon and Yoko Ono co-host an entire week on The Mike Douglas Show in the U.S.
- February 19 – Sammy Davis Jr. makes a guest appearance on All in the Family
- March 18 – After losing a 15-year court battle over the legality of its business relationship with The Herald-Traveler, CBS' Boston, Massachusetts affiliate WHDH-TV Channel 5 signs off the air. At 3 a.m. on March 19, WCVB takes over the Channel 5 frequency, simultaneously switching affiliations to the ABC network following CBS' loss of interest in the channel during the long legal wrangle.
- March 27 – The Amateur's Guide to Love begins on the air, making it CBS' first attempt to make a game show since 1968 when To Tell the Truth went off the air. It fails after 3 months
- April 4 – After a three-year courtship, Emily Nugent (Eileen Derbyshire) marries Ernest Bishop (Stephen Hancock) on ITV soap Coronation Street in the U.K.
- May – The Tonight Show Starring Johnny Carson relocates its production from New York City to the NBC studios in Burbank, California. The Tonight Show will remain there until relocating back to New York in February 2014
- July 21 – Victoria Wyndham makes her first appearance as vixen (and later, good girl) Rachel Davis on the U.S. soap opera Another World
- August 1 – Three years after it was first filmed, the Israel Broadcasting Authority finally agrees to screen Barricades, a controversial documentary film that offers a sympathetic portrayal of Palestinians expelled from their homes in the 1948 Arab–Israeli War
- August 26 – Effective with this issue, TV Guide in the U.S. discontinues the practice of using a "C" to indicate color programs, and instead starts using a "BW" for monochrome, saving a lot of printer's ink in the process. At thIS time about half of the TV households in the U.S. have color sets
- September 1 – A day for CBS' daytime lineup that marks the end of an era. CBS airs reruns of popular primetime shows, The Lucy Show, The Beverly Hillbillies and My Three Sons for the final time, as reruns dominating CBS' daytime lineup (a tradition since 1959). The following Monday, all three shows move to syndication
- September 4 – Another eventful day for CBS' daytime schedule. The Price Is Right premieres on CBS. It becomes the longest running game show on American television. The Joker's Wild and Gambit also debut, bringing game shows back to CBS' schedule in a more successful attempt than The Amateur's Guide to Love, which was cancelled on June 23, and replacing the morning reruns dominating CBS' daytime lineup (a staple since 1959).
- September 9 – The Lawrence Welk Show opens its 18th season on location in Hawaii
- October 27 – The 5000th episode of CBS children's show Captain Kangaroo airs
- November 8 – Home Box Office (HBO) is launched, in Wilkes-Barre, Pennsylvania
- November 21 – In the second part of a two-part story which began the previous week, Beatrice Arthur's character, Maude Findlay, on the U.S. television sitcom Maude, decides to go through with an abortion, in a move that shocks CBS executives and Maude advertisers. (Rue McClanahan makes her first appearance as Vivian Cavender in this two-parter; she will become a regular cast member the following season)
- November 25 – The 1st OTI Festival is broadcast live via satellite by Televisión Española (TVE) from the Palacio de Exposiciones y Congresos, in Madrid, Spain, to all the Organización de Televisión Iberoamericana (OTI) member broadcasters in Ibero-America, which aired it in their countries.
- December 31
  - ORTF 3ème Chaîne launches in France
  - The first installment of Dick Clark's New Year's Rockin' Eve airs on NBC, beginning a yearly tradition of Dick Clark-hosted New Year's specials

== Programs ==
- 60 Minutes (1968–)
- About Safety (1972–1973)
- All in the Family (1971–1979)
- All My Children (1970–2011)
- American Bandstand (1952–1989)
- Another World (1964–1999)
- As the World Turns (1956–2010)
- Blue Peter (UK) (1958–)
- Bonanza (1959–1973)
- Bozo the Clown (1949–)
- Candid Camera (1948–)
- Captain Kangaroo (1955–1984)
- Columbo (1971–1978)
- Come Dancing (UK) (1949–95)
- Coronation Street (UK) (1960–)
- Crossroads (UK) (1964–1988, 2001–2003)
- Dad's Army (UK) (1968–1977)
- Days of Our Lives (1965–)
- Devilman (Japan) (1972–1973)
- Dixon of Dock Green (UK) (1955–1976)
- Doctor Who (UK) (1963–1989, 1996, 2005–)
- Emmerdale Farm (1972–)
- Face the Nation (1954–)
- Four Corners (Australia) (1961–)
- General Hospital (1963–)
- Grandstand (UK) (1958–2007)
- Gunsmoke (1955–1975)
- Hallmark Hall of Fame (1951–)
- Hawaii Five-O (1968–1980)
- Hee Haw (1969–1993)
- Here's Lucy (1968–1974)
- Ironside (1967–1975)
- It's Academic (1961–)
- Jeopardy! (1964–1975, 1984–)
- Kashi no Ki Mokku (Adventures of Pinocchio) (Japan) (1972)
- Kimba the White Lion (1966–1967), re-runs
- Laugh-In (1968–1973)
- Leave It to Beaver (1957–1963)
- Lost In Space (1965–1968)
- Love is a Many Splendored Thing (1967–73)
- Love of Life (1951–1980)
- Love, American Style (1969–1974)
- Magpie (UK)(1968–1980)
- Mannix (1967–1975)
- Marcus Welby, M.D. (1969–1976)
- Mary Tyler Moore (1970–77)
- Masterpiece Theatre (1971–)
- McCloud (1970–1977)
- McMillan & Wife (1971–1977)
- Meet the Press (1947–)
- Mission: Impossible (1966–1973)
- Monday Night Football (1970–)
- Monty Python's Flying Circus (UK) (1969–1974)
- Old Grey Whistle Test (UK) (1971–1987)
- One Life to Live (1968–2012)
- Opportunity Knocks (UK) (1956–78)
- Panorama (UK) (1953–)
- Play for Today (UK) (1970–1984)
- Play School (1966–)
- Rainbow (1972–1992)
- Room 222 (1969–1974)
- Search for Tomorrow (1951–1986)
- Sesame Street (1969–)
- Soul Train (1971–2006)
- The Benny Hill Show (1969–1989)
- The Brady Bunch (1969–1974)
- The Carol Burnett Show (1967–1978)
- The Dean Martin Show (1965–1974)
- The Doctors (1963–1982)
- The Doris Day Show (1968–1973)
- The Edge of Night (1956–1984)
- The Flip Wilson Show (1970–1974)
- The Good Old Days (UK) (1953–1983)
- The Guiding Light (1952–2009)
- The Late Late Show (Ireland) (1962–)
- The Lawrence Welk Show (1955–1982)
- The Mike Douglas Show (1961–1981)
- The Mod Squad (1968–1973)
- The Money Programme (UK) (1966–)
- The New Dick Van Dyke Show (1971–1974)
- The Newlywed Game (1966–1974)
- The Odd Couple (1970–75)
- The Partridge Family (1970–1974)
- The Price Is Right (1972–)
- The Secret Storm (1954–1974)
- The Sky at Night (UK) (1957–)
- The Sonny & Cher Comedy Hour (1971–1974)
- The Today Show (1952–)
- The Tonight Show Starring Johnny Carson (1962–1992)
- The Wonderful World of Disney (1969–1979)
- This Is Your Life (UK) (1955–2003)
- Tom and Jerry (1965–1972, 1975–1977, 1980–1982)
- Top of the Pops (UK) (1964–2006)
- Truth or Consequences (1950–1988)
- What the Papers Say (UK) (1956–)
- Where the Heart Is (1969–1973)
- World of Sport (UK) (1965–1985)
- Z-Cars (UK) (1962–1978)

=== Debuts ===
- January 4 – Des chiffres et des lettres on ORTF 2ème Chaîne in France (1972–)
- January 13 – Me and the Chimp on CBS (1 season)
- January 14 – Sanford and Son on NBC (1972–1977)
- January 15 – Emergency! on NBC (1972–1977)
- January 16 – The Moonstone on BBC1 (1972)
- March 13 – Number 96 on Australia's 0–10 Network (1972–1977)
- April 4 – John Craven's Newsround (now titled Newsround) on BBC1
- April 7 – Ultraman Ace on TBS in Japan (1972–73)
- May 21 – Bel Ami on ABC (1972)
- June 21 – The Super (1972–1972) on ABC.
- June 22 – The first Tattslotto draw on HSV-7 Melbourne
- July 5 – Tony Bennett at the Talk of the Town on Thames Television (first and only series)
- July 8 – Android Kikaider on TV Asahi (formerly NET) (1972–1973)
- August 16 – About Safety on PBS
- September 4 – The New Price Is Right (1972–present), The Joker's Wild (1972–1975, 1977–1986), and Gambit (1972–1976) all on CBS. Any Number, Bonus Game, and Double Prices were the three games played on the first episode of The New Price Is Right, which loses the "New" by mid-1973, and is currently television's longest running game show in history, having started its 43rd season in September 2014.
- September 8 – Are You Being Served? (1972–1985) on BBC1
- September 9
  - Runaround on NBC (1972–1973)
  - Fat Albert and the Cosby Kids (1972–1984) and The New Scooby-Doo Movies (1972–1973) both on CBS
- September 11 – Mastermind (1972–97, 2002–) on BBC1; The Rookies (1972–1976) on ABC
- September 12
  - Maude, a spinoff of All in the Family on CBS (1972–1978)
  - Temperatures Rising on ABC (1972–1974)
- September 13
  - The Julie Andrews Hour on ABC; although only on for one season, it won seven Emmy Awards including Best Musical Variety Series.
  - The Paul Lynde Show (1972-1973) on ABC.
- September 14 – The Waltons on CBS (1972–1981)
- September 15 – Ghost Story on NBC (1972–1973)
- September 16
  - The Bob Newhart Show (1972–1978) and Bridget Loves Bernie (1972–1973) on CBS
  - The Streets of San Francisco on ABC (1972–1977)
- September 17
  - M*A*S*H on CBS (1972–1983)
  - The Adventures of Black Beauty (1972–74) on ITV
- October 2 – The Stanley Baxter Picture Show (1972–75) on ITV
- October 3 – 4 Country Reporter on then-CBS affiliate KDFW Channel 4 (now a Fox O&O station); in 1986, the show moves into first-run syndication under the new name Texas Country Reporter, eventually airing nationally on the RFD-TV satellite/cable channel.
- October 14 – Kung Fu on ABC (1972–75)
- October 16 – Emmerdale Farm starts transmissions in the daytime on ITV (1972–)
- October 19 – Prisoner-of-war drama
  - Colditz on BBC1
  - The Beachcombers (1972–1989) and This Is the Law (1972–1976) both on CBC
  - Canada AM on CTV (1972–)
- November 4 – Great Performances on PBS (1972–)

=== Ending this year ===
Date	Show	Debut
January 8	The Good Life (US)	1971
March 1	The Courtship of Eddie's Father (US)	1969
March 10	O'Hara, U.S. Treasury (US)	1971
March 12	The Jimmy Stewart Show (US)	1971
March 25	Bewitched (US)	1964
March 31	Bright Promise (US)	1969
March 31	The Return of Ultraman (Japan)	1971
April 27	Me and the Chimp (US)	1972
August 14	Doomwatch (UK)	1970
August 23	The Super (US)	1972
August 24	My Three Sons (US)	1960
September 2	The Road Runner Show	1966
November 10	Clangers (UK)	1969
November 29	Kate (UK)	1970
December 4	Father Brown (West Germany)	1966

== Births ==
Date	Name	Notability
January 2	Christopher Lennertz	Composer
January 9	Deon Cole	Actor and comedian (Black-ish)
January 11	Marc Blucas	Actor (Buffy the Vampire Slayer, Necessary Roughness, Underground)
January 11	Amanda Peet	Actress (Jack & Jill)
January 12	Zabryna Guevara	Actress (Gotham)
January 13	Nicole Eggert	Actress (Charles in Charge, Baywatch)
January 19	Drea de Matteo	Actress (The Sopranos, Joey, Desperate Housewives, Sons of Anarchy, Shades of Blue)
January 22	Gabriel Macht	Actor
January 27	Nic Testoni	Actor (Home and Away)
January 27	Josh Randall	Actor (Ed)
January 28	Gillian Vigman	Comic actress (Mad TV)
January 29	Lisa Desjardins	American Journalist (PBS NewsHour)
February 2	Zoë Keating	Composer
February 4	Nicolle Wallace	TV host
February 7	Robyn Lively	Actress (Savannah, Gortimer Gibbon's Life on Normal Street)
February 7	Essence Atkins	Actress (Smart Guy, Half & Half, Are We There Yet?) and model
February 8	Paul Wight	Actor and professional wrestler
February 9	Jason Winston George	Actor (Sunset Beach, Eve, Grey's Anatomy)
February 11	Kelly Slater	American professional surfer
February 14	Rob Thomas	Singer
February 16	Sarah Clarke	Actress (24, Bosch)
February 16	Jerome Bettis	Football player
February 16	Steven Molaro	American television producer
February 17	Billie Joe Armstrong	Singer
February 22	Keir Simmons	British journalist
February 26	Keith Ferguson	Voice actor (Foster's Home for Imaginary Friends, Wander Over Yonder)
February 27	Susan Yeagley	Actress
February 28	Rory Cochrane	Actor (CSI: Miami)
February 28	Nejat İşler	Actor
February 29	Saul Williams	Actor
February 29	Antonio Sabàto Jr.	Actor
February 29	Joey Greco	Television host
February 29	Sylvie Lubamba	Television model
February 29	Steve Hart	Actor
February 29	Pedro Zamora	Television personality (d. 1994)
March 2	Richard Ruccolo	Actor (Two Guys and a Girl)
March 6	Shaquille O'Neal	NBA basketball player and actor (Shaq Vs.)
March 7	Dina Cantin	American television personality
March 9	Jean Louisa Kelly	Actress (Yes, Dear)
March 9	Kerr Smith	Actor (Dawson's Creek, Charmed)
March 9	Travis Lane Stork	Television personality
March 11	Jennifer Barnhart	Actress
March 13	Common	Rapper and actor
March 18	Dane Cook	Actor
March 23	Reggie Watts	Actor
March 26	Leslie Mann	Actress (Allen Gregory)
March 31	Andrew Bowen	Actor (Mad TV)
April 3	Jennie Garth	Actress (Beverly Hills, 90210, What I Like About You)
April 4	Kevin Brown	Comedian and actor (30 Rock)
April 4	Jill Scott	Singer and actress (Black Lightning, First Wives Club)
April 6	Jason Hervey	Actor (The Wonder Years)
April 8	Chuck Todd	Television journalist (Meet the Press)
April 8	Sung Kang	Actor
April 17	Jennifer Garner	Actress (Alias)
April 18	Eli Roth	Actor
April 19	Jennifer Taylor	Actress (Two and a Half Men)
April 20	Carmen Electra	Model and actress (Baywatch)
April 20	Danny McNulty	Actor (Boy Meets World)
April 22	Willie Robertson	American TV personality
April 27	David Lascher	Actor (Hey Dude, Blossom, Sabrina the Teenage Witch)
April 27	Wellesley Wild	Writer
May 1	Julie Benz	Actress (Buffy the Vampire Slayer, Dexter, No Ordinary Family, Defiance)
May 2	Dwayne Johnson	Professional wrestler and actor
May 3	Reza Aslan	Television host
May 4	Mike Dirnt	American rock musician
May 4	Micah Ohlman	American journalist
May 8	Brian Tyler	Composer
May 9	Chu Sang-mi	Korean actress
May 9	Dana Perino	American political commentator
May 12	Rhea Seehorn	American actress
May 15	David Charvet	French singer and actor (Baywatch)
May 16	Khary Payton	Actor (The Walking Dead, Teen Titans, Young Justice)
May 18	Teresa Giudice	American television personality
May 19	Claudia Karvan	Actress
May 20	Busta Rhymes	Rapper and actor (The Boondocks)
May 21	The Notorious B.I.G.	Rapper (d. 1997)
May 22	Anna Belknap	Actress (CSI: NY)
May 29	Laverne Cox	Actress
May 31	Archie Panjabi	Actress (The Good Wife, The Fall, Blindspot)
May 31	Sara Sidner	American journalist
June 2	Wayne Brady	American actor (Whose Line Is It Anyway?), host (Let's Make a Deal)
June 2	Wentworth Miller	British-American actor (Prison Break, The Flash, Legends of Tomorrow)
June 3	Sharyn Alfonsi	American journalist
June 6	Natalie Morales	American journalist
June 7	Karl Urban	New Zealand actor
June 12	Finesse Mitchell	American actor and comedian (Saturday Night Live)
June 16	John Cho	American actor
June 18	Ash Atalla	Egyptian-born British producer
June 19	Eric Sheffer Stevens	American actor (As the World Turns)
June 19	Robin Tunney	American actress (Prison Break, The Mentalist)
June 19	Poppy Montgomery	Australian-American actress (Relativity, Without a Trace, Unforgettable)
June 23	Selma Blair	American actress (Anger Management)
June 27	Christian Kane	American actor
June 28	Alessandro Nivola	American actor
June 29	Kevin Mambo	Zimbabwean-Canadian actor (Guiding Light)
June 29	Samantha Smith	American activist and actress who appeared on the Disney Channel, Lime Street, and The Tonight Show Starring Johnny Carson, among other appearances. (d. 1985)
June 30	Molly Parker	Canadian actress
July 7	Kirsten Vangsness	Actress (Criminal Minds)
July 10	Sofía Vergara	Colombian actress (Modern Family) and model
July 11	Michael Rosenbaum	Actor (Smallville, Justice League, The Zeta Project)
July 12	Kerri Kasem	Radio host
July 13	Sean Waltman	Pro wrestler
July 15	Scott Foley	Actor (Felicity, The Unit, True Blood, Scandal)
July 17	Elizabeth Cook	Singer and radio host
July 20	Vitamin C	Singer
July 22	Colin Ferguson	Actor
July 23	Marlon Wayans	Actor (In Living Color, The Wayans Bros.)
July 27	Maya Rudolph	Actress (Saturday Night Live, Big Mouth, The Good Place)
July 27	Jill Arrington	Sportscaster
July 29	Wil Wheaton	Actor (Star Trek: The Next Generation, Teen Titans, Ben 10: Alien Force)
August 1	Guri Weinberg	Actor
August 2	Jacinda Barrett	Actress
August 7	Heather Kadin	Television producer
August 9	Liz Vassey	Actress (All My Children, The Tick, CSI: Crime Scene Investigation)
August 10	Angie Harmon	American actress (Law & Order, Rizzoli & Isles) and model
August 13	Michael Sinterniklaas	French-American actor (Kappa Mikey, Miraculous: Tales of Ladybug & Cat Noir)
August 15	Syd Butler	Band leader
August 16	George Stroumboulopoulos	Canadian media personality
August 17	Chiquinquirá Delgado	Actress
August 19	Jeremy Hubbard	American news anchor
August 24	Ava DuVernay	Filmmaker
August 30	Cameron Diaz	Actress
September 6	Dylan Bruno	Actor (NCIS, Numb3rs)
September 6	Justina Machado	Actress (Six Feet Under, Queen of the South)
September 6	Kendis Gibson	Anchor
September 8	Kennedy	Fox News commentator
September 9	Goran Višnjić	Croatian-American actor (ER)
September 15	Letizia Ortiz Rocasolano	Spanish TV journalist, later queen consort
September 15	John Schwab	American actor, TV producer, musician (Weaponology, Wife Swap, Trust)
September 16	Alex Rice	Actress
September 20	Sergio Di Zio	Canadian actor (Flashpoint)
September 23	Karl Pilkington	English presenter
September 24	Finty Williams	English actress
September 26	Melanie Paxson	Actress (Notes from the Underbelly) and Red Robin spokesperson
September 27	Gwyneth Paltrow	Actress and singer
September 30	Jamal Anderson	American football running back
October 5	Thomas Roberts	American television journalist
October 5	Grant Hill	NBA basketball player
October 10	Joelle Carter	Actress
October 11	Claudia Black	Actress
October 16	Trentemøller	Composer
October 17	Eminem	Rapper
October 17	Sharon Leal	Actress
October 24	Susan Barnett	News anchor
October 25	Persia White	Actress (Girlfriends)
October 28	Brad Paisley	Singer
October 29	Tracee Ellis Ross	Actress (Girlfriends, Black-ish) and daughter of Diana Ross
October 29	Gabrielle Union	Actress
November 1	Toni Collette	Actress (United States of Tara) and singer
November 1	Michael Seitzman	Writer
November 1	Jenny McCarthy	Actress
November 6	Thandiwe Newton	English actress (Westworld)
November 7	Jeremy London	Actor (Party of Five, 7th Heaven)
November 8	Gretchen Mol	Actress
November 9	Eric Dane	Actor (Charmed, Grey's Anatomy, The Last Ship) (d. 2026)
November 11	Adam Beach	Actor (Walker, Texas Ranger, Law & Order: Special Victims Unit)
November 14	Josh Duhamel	Actor (Las Vegas)
November 16	Brandi Glanville	American television personality
November 19	Sandrine Holt	Actress
November 15	Jonny Lee Miller	English-American actor (Eli Stone, Elementary)
November 15	Michael Pearlman	Actor (Charles in Charge)
November 16	Brandi Glanville	American television personality
November 17	Leonard Roberts	Actor (Heroes)
November 28	Sage Steele	Anchor (ESPN)
November 29	Brian Baumgartner	Actor (The Office) and director
November 30	Christophe Beck	Composer
December 5	Ruthanna Hopper	Actress
December 6	Mónica Santa María	Peruvian model and TV host (d. 1994)
December 6	Sarah Rafferty	Actress
December 7	Jason Winer	Actor
December 9	Reiko Aylesworth	Actress (24)
December 9	Tré Cool	Singer
December 9	Michael Corcoran	Musician
December 13	Mo Elleithee	American political campaign strategist
December 14	Miranda Hart	English comic actress and writer (Miranda, Not Going Out, Call the Midwife)
December 15	Stuart Townsend	Actor
December 18	Jason Mantzoukas	Actor
December 19	Rosa Blasi	Actress (Strong Medicine, The Thundermans)
December 19	Alyssa Milano	Actress (Who's the Boss?, Melrose Place, Charmed, Mistresses)
December 22	Poorna Jagannathan	Actress
December 27	Brooke Totman	Comedic actress (Mad TV)
December 29	Barry Atsma	Dutch actor (Rozengeur & Wodka Lime)
December 29	Jude Law	Actor

== Deaths ==
Date	Name	Age	Notability
January 16	Ross Bagdasarian, Sr.	52	Composer, creator of The Alvin Show
May 12	Steve Ihnat	37	Actor (Star Trek)
May 13	Dan Blocker	43	Actor (Hoss Cartwright on Bonanza)
October 16	Leo G. Carroll	85	English actor (Topper, Going My Way, The Man from U.N.C.L.E.)
December 26	Harry S. Truman	88	Politician and 33rd President of the United States

== Television debuts ==
- Margaret Avery – Something Evil
- Timothy Bottoms – Look Homeward, Angel
- Ned Beatty – Footsteps
- John Candy – Cucumber
- Joanna Cassidy – Mission: Impossible
- Candy Clark – Room 222
- Ronny Cox – Look Homeward, Angel
- Bill Duke – ABC Afterschool Specials
- Ian Holm – BBC Play of the Month
- Timothy Hutton – The Magical World of Disney
- Jackie Earle Haley – The Carol Burnett Show
- Bob Hoskins – The Main Chance
- Jonathan Pryce – Doomwatch
- Randy Quaid – Night Gallery
- Vincent Schiavelli – The Corner Bar
- John Travolta – Emergency!
- Rita Wilson – The Brady Bunch

== See also ==
- 1972–73 United States network television schedule
