= The Dead of Jaffa =

2019 film

- Promotional release poster
- Directed by: Ram Loevy
- Written by: Gilad Evron; Ala Hlehel
- Produced by: Itai Tamir
- Cinematography: Yoram Millo
- Edited by: Neta Braun
- Music by: Ran Bagno
- Release date: 29 July 2019 (Jerusalem)
- Running time: 96 minutes
- Country: Israel
- Languages: Hebrew; Arabic; English

The Dead of Jaffa (Hametim Shel Yafo) is a 2019 Israeli drama film directed by Ram Loevy and written by Gilad Evron and Ala Klehel. The film premiered at the Jerusalem Film Festival. It was nominated for the Ophir Award for Best Film.

== Plot ==
The film follows three siblings who are smuggled from the West Bank into Jaffa, Israel, to live with their alleged uncle, George (Yussuf Abu Warda), and his wife, Rita (Ruba Blal). After their mother’s death and their father’s imprisonment, the children arrive unexpectedly, much to Rita’s surprise. George and Rita, a childless couple, respond differently to the situation—Rita embraces the children with maternal affection, while George fears the legal consequences of harboring illegal immigrants.

The eldest sibling, Talal (Jihad Babay), resists the restrictions of hiding and begins exploring the neighborhood. During one of his excursions, he discovers an abandoned house nearby. George, attempting to keep Talal away from the house, claims it is haunted by the ghosts of Jaffa's former residents. Despite this, Talal shares his discovery with his siblings.

Simultaneously, an English filmmaker, Jerry (Johnny Phillips), is in Jaffa shooting a film about his parents’ experiences in 1947 Mandatory Palestine. Jerry casts George in the role of a Palestinian doctor, believing he suits the part. While George balances his work at a convenience store and his film role, Rita bonds with the children, introducing them to new experiences, such as their first visit to the beach. However, the constant threat of police discovery looms. George attempts to shield the younger siblings, while Talal continues to explore the area.

During his wanderings, Talal observes Vera (Maya Flamm), an actress portraying her grandmother in Jerry’s film. A pivotal scene involves a pregnant British woman seeking an abortion from a Palestinian doctor, who refuses and redirects her to Tel Aviv. The scene concludes with the woman’s partner, a British soldier, killing the doctor. Talal witnesses George’s character endure repeated degradation during filming, raising questions about George’s involvement in the production.

In another scene, Jerry orchestrates a protest sequence with Palestinian actors reenacting demonstrations against British soldiers. Talal, inspired by the charged atmosphere, joins the protest with genuine passion. Jerry, captivated by Talal’s emotional intensity, shifts his focus to him. Talal’s enthusiasm stirs the actors, leading to an unscripted escalation as the protest spills off set and clashes with Israeli police. Amid the chaos, Talal is accidentally killed.

Talal’s death profoundly impacts the family and exposes the children’s illegal status to the authorities. Despite the looming threat of deportation, George, Rita, and Doris (Maysa Daw) resolve to protect the remaining siblings, confronting the situation with determination.

== Cast ==
- Yusuf Abu Warda as George
- Bilal Babai as Ibrahim
- Jihad Babay as Talal
- Ruba Blal as Rita
- Maya Flamm as Vera
- Johnny Phillips as Jerry
