= S. Yizhar =

Israeli writer and politician

- יִזְהָר סְמִילַנְסְקִי
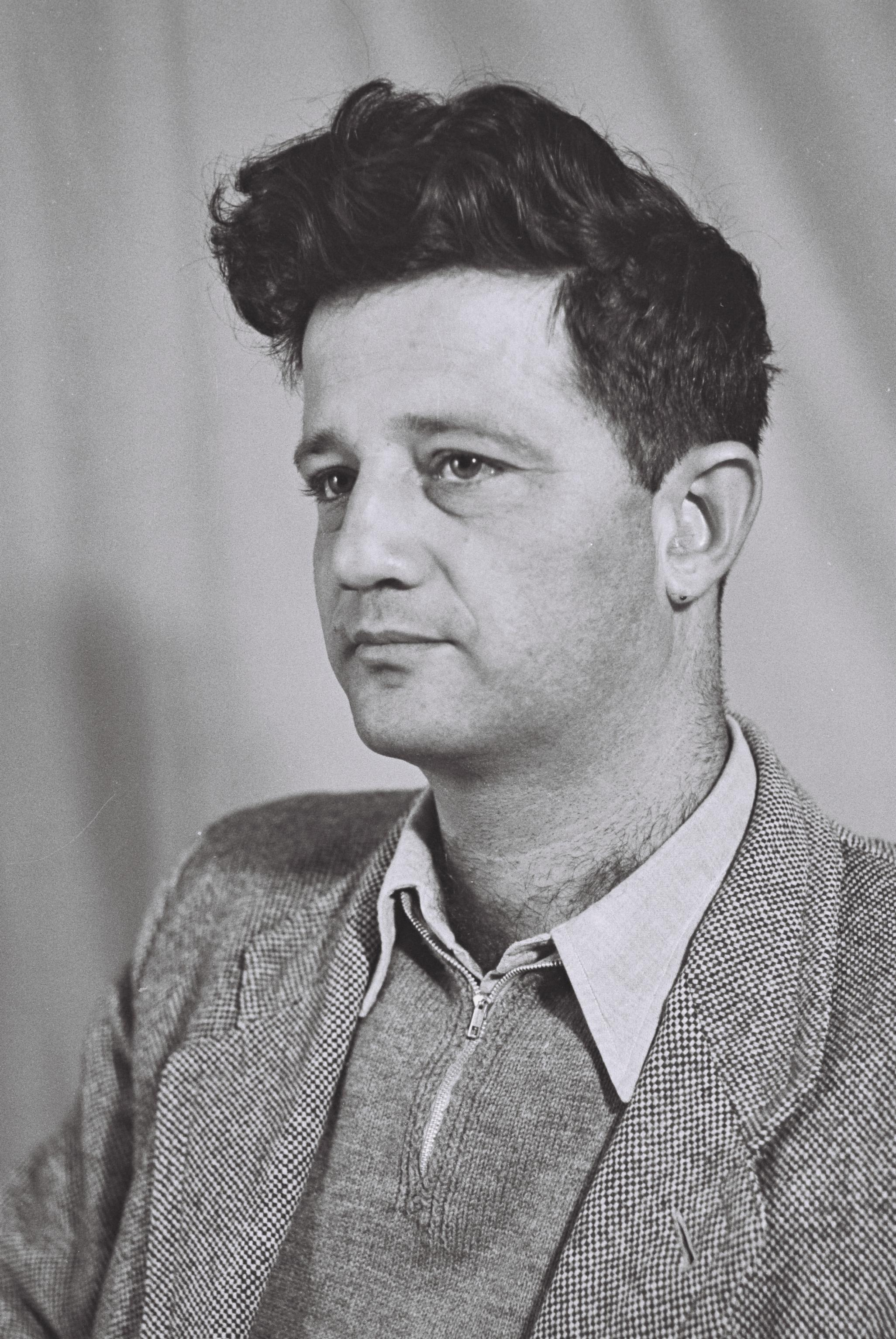
- Yizhar in 1951

Faction represented in the Knesset
- 1949–1955: Mapai
- 1956–1965: Mapai
- 1965–1967: Rafi

Personal details
- Born: Yizhar Smilansky; 27 September 1916 Rehovot, Ottoman Empire
- Died: 21 August 2006 (aged 89)
- Spouse: Noemi Wellman

Yizhar Smilansky (Hebrew: יִזְהָר סְמִילַנְסְקִי; 27 September 1916 – 21 August 2006), known by his pen name S. Yizhar (ס. יִזְהָר), was an Israeli writer and politician. Widely regarded as one of the preeminent figures in Israeli literature, he was awarded the Israel Prize in 1959 for fine literature. He was also awarded several other prizes of national distinction. Yizhar served in the Knesset under Mapai party almost continuously from 1949 to 1967.

== Biography ==
Yizhar Smilansky was born in Rehovot to a family of writers. His great-uncle was Israeli writer Moshe Smilansky. His father, Zev Zass Smilensky, was also a writer. After the end of World War I, the family moved to Tel Aviv where Yizhar attended the Balfour school. The family returned to Rehovot when he was 11. After earning a degree in education from the Beit Hakerem Seminar in Jerusalem, Yizhar taught in Yavniel, Ben Shemen, Hulda, and Rehovot. He served as an intelligence officer in the Israel Defense Forces during the 1948 Arab–Israeli War.

Yizhar married Noemi Wellman (or Wollman) in 1942. They had three children, Yisrael (born 1942), Hila (born 1944), and Ze'ev (born 1954).

== Literary career ==
From the end of the 1930s to the 1950s, Yizhar published short novellas, among them Ephraim Goes Back to Alfalfa, On the Edge of the Negev, The Wood on the Hill, A Night Without Shootings, Journey to the Evening's Shores, Midnight Convoy, as well as several collections of short stories. His pen name was given to him by the poet and editor Yitzhak Lamdan when in 1938 he published Yizhar's first story Ephraim Goes Back to Alfalfa in his literary journal Galleons. From then on, Yizhar signed his works with his pen name.

In 1949, he published the novella Khirbet Khizeh, in which he described the expulsion of Palestinian Arabs from their fictional village by the IDF during the 1948 Arab–Israeli War. It became a best-seller and in 1964 was included in the Israeli high school curriculum. In 1978, a controversy arose after a dramatization of Khirbet Khizeh by director Ram Loevy was aired on Israeli television. Shapira has lamented that, despite the publishing of Yizhar's novella decades earlier, Benny Morris was able, when he published The Birth of the Palestinian Refugee Problem, 1947–1949 in 1988, to announce "himself as the man who had laid bare the original sin of the State of Israel".

In the late 1950s, his massive work Days of Ziklag appeared, comprising two volumes and more than a thousand pages. This work had a powerful impact on changing the outlook for Hebrew prose on the one hand, and "war literature" on the other. Although Yizhar remained in the public eye as an outstanding polemicist, he broke his decades-long literary silence only in 1992 with the publication of his novel, Mikdamot (Preliminaries). This was quickly followed by five additional new volumes of prose, both novels and collections of short stories, including Tsalhavim, Etsel Ha-Yam (At Sea), Tsedadiyim (Asides), and Malkomyah Yefehfiyah (Beautiful Malcolmia). His last work, Gilui Eliahu (Discovering Elijah), set in the period of the Yom Kippur War, was published in 1999 and later adapted for the stage. The play won first prize at the Acco Festival of Alternative Israeli Theatre in 2001. Yizhar also wrote stories for children in which he contended with the defining themes of his youth, as in Oran and Ange concerning the Israeli cultivation of citrus fruits; Uncle Moshe's Chariot, a memoir of the character of his famous great uncle Moshe Smilansky; and others.

== Academic career ==
Yizhar was a professor of education at the Hebrew University of Jerusalem. In 1986–1987 he was a Visiting Writer at the Center for Jewish Studies at Harvard University. He was a lecturer at Levinsky College in Tel Aviv into the late 1990s.

== Political career ==
Yizhar was elected to the first Knesset in 1949, remaining a Knesset member until the 1955 elections. He returned to the Knesset in October 1956 as a replacement for Aharon Becker. In 1965 he defected to David Ben-Gurion's new Rafi party, but resigned from the Knesset on 20 February 1967. He subsequently joined Ben-Gurion's new National List and was given the symbolic 120th place on its list for the 1969 elections.

== Literary style ==
Yizhar's early work was influenced by Uri Nissan Gnessin. His knowledge of Israeli geology, geomorphology, climate, and flora is evident in his landscape descriptions and his emphasis on the relationship between person and place. Yizhar's use of language is unique. With his long sentences and combination of literary Hebrew and street jargon, he draws the reader into his heroes' stream of consciousness.

== Awards ==
- In 1959, Yizhar was awarded the Israel Prize for his literary merits
- In 1959, he was awarded the Brenner Prize for literature.
- In 1960, he was awarded the Lamdan Prize for children's literature.
- In 1991, he was awarded the Bialik Prize for literature.
- In 2002, he received the annual Israeli EMET Prize for Art, Science and Culture.
- He is also the recipient of the David Ben-Gurion Award.

== See also ==
- List of Israel Prize recipients
- List of Bialik Prize recipients
- Khirbet Khizeh

== Relevant literature ==
- Ben-Dov, Nitza. "My Imaginary Offspring: Reality and Fantasy in Days of Ziklag by S. Yizhar and in If There is a Heaven by Ron Leshem." Hebrew Studies 50, no. 1 (2009): 185-194.
