= Khirbet Khizeh =

Book by S. Yizhar

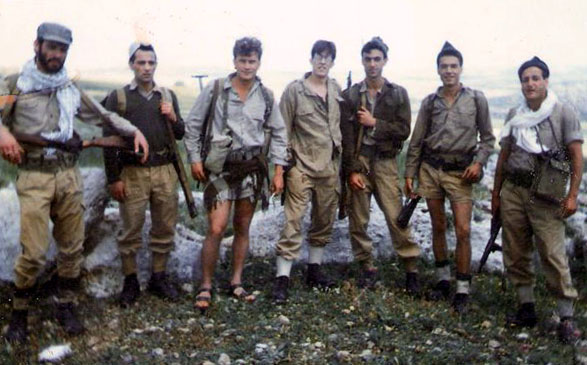
The actors who played the soldiers who expelled the villagers in the TV drama Khirbet Hiz'ah. From left to right: Amos Tal Shir, Itzik Aloni, Dalik Velinitz, Gidi Gov, Avi Luzia, Shraga Harpaz and Avraham Sidi.

Khirbet Khizeh (Hebrew: חִרְבֶּת חִזְעָה, also Hirbet Hizeh, Hirbet Hizah) is a historical fiction novel by Israeli writer S. Yizhar which was published in 1949, and deals with the expulsion of the fictional village of Khirbet Hiz'ah, practically representing a depiction of all Arab villages whose inhabitants were expelled during 1948 Arab–Israeli War in 1948, events which are known to Palestinians as the Nakba.

The book was a best-seller in Israel.

From 1964 onwards, the book was part of the Israeli high school curriculum. Gil Z. Hochberg described it as the first example of the "shooting and crying" genre.

The story was later made into a 1978 TV drama on Israeli Channel 1 produced by Ram Loevy, and sparked a public debate in Israel on whether it should be broadcast or not.

In a 1978 essay, Yizhar maintained that the novel was a work of fiction, however the descriptions of the events were historically accurate. Yehuda Be’eri, Yizhar's former commander, identified the events as the expulsion Be'eri ordered on Khirbet Khisas and eight other villages on November 25, 1948.
