= Grabbit the Rabbit =

- Genre: Animation, claymation, children's television series
- Created by: Rony Oren
- Written by: Rony Oren; Michale Zucker
- Directed by: Rony Oren
- Starring: Stephen Arnoff; Gary Brint; Lanny Ravich; Johanan Herson; Don Futterman; Pnina Isseroff; Elki Jacobs; Amy Greenbaum Kohn; Linda Lovitch; Larry Butchins; Jack Adalist; Bobby Lax; Itzik Seydoff; Robert Hennig; Shmulik Tene; Niko Bar; Eli Gorenstein; Shimon Cohen; Jacob Buch; Yoav Heyman; Gabi Keren; Ayelet Kurtz; Esti Katz
- Theme music composer: David Friedland; David Saban
- Opening theme: "Grabbit the Rabbit" by David Friedland and David Saban
- Countries of origin: Israel; United Kingdom
- Original languages: English; Hebrew
- No. of series: 1
- No. of episodes: 13

Production
- Producer: Rony Oren
- Running time: 8 minutes
- Production companies: Rony Oren Production; Israel Broadcasting Authority; Link Entertainment

Original release
- Network: Israel Broadcasting Authority (Israel); Channel 1 (Israel); Channel 4 (United Kingdom)
- Release: 1999

Grabbit the Rabbit (known in Hebrew as ארנב עכשיו) is a 1999 claymation animated television series produced by Israeli animator Rony Oren with the Israel Broadcasting Authority. The series' plot was based on Jean de La Fontaine's Fables and the African-American Uncle Remus folktales and stories by Joel Chandler Harris. It focuses on the adventures of Grabbit the Rabbit, who uses his brain and always succeeds in surviving and helping the less strong animals of the forest. The series was originally produced in Israel in 1995-1998. 13 episodes were produced. All the characters were made from moulded plasticine modelling clay on metal armatures.

The series originally premiered on Channel 1. On 5 February 1999, Link Entertainment acquired the distribution rights to the series from Oren and the Israel Broadcasting Authority. On 17 September 1999, Channel 4 struck a deal with Link over broadcast rights for the series in the United Kingdom, with the show premiering on 20 October 1999. The series also aired on more than 20 television networks worldwide, including Fox Kids in France, DR1 in Denmark as Den Kvikke Kanin ("The Nimble Rabbit"), NRK in Norway as Den smarte kaninen ("The Smart Rabbit"), Asia Television in Hong Kong, and Transworld Association and Kids Station in Japan. On 18 March 2002, the series was released on VHS by Entertainment Rights and Universal Home Entertainment as Grabbit The Rabbit: King For The Day and Other Stories. In 2004, it was released on DVD as Grabbit The Rabbit: King For A Day and Other Stories.

== Characters ==
- Grabbit the Rabbit, a grey rabbit
- Elmore Foxton III, an orange fox
- Brinkley Bear, a blue bear
- Sneakly Snakely, a green snake
- King Leonardo, a yellow lion
- Jorgen Jackal, a green jackal
- Mortimer Mouse, a white mouse
- Rex Dog, a brown dog
- Ralph Raccoon, a light blue raccoon
- Ralph's Wife, a pink raccoon
- Ralph's Children, light blue and pink raccoons
- Vinnie Frog, a green frog
- Vinnie's Brothers, green frogs
- Morty Mole, a purple mole
- Henrietta Hedgehog, a light blue hedgehog
- Camellia Cow, a black cow
- Gilda Goose, a pink goose
- Gwendola Goose, a white goose

== Voice cast ==
=== English ===
- Stephen Arnoff
- Gary Brint
- Lanny Ravich
- Johanan Herson as Sneakly Snakely
- Don Futterman
- Pnina Isseroff
- Elki Jacobs as Gwendola Goose
- Amy Greenbaum Kohn
- Linda Lovitch as Ralph's Wife and Gilda Goose
- Larry Butchins
- Jack Adalist
- Bobby Lax as Elmore Foxton III and the Narrator

=== Israeli ===
- Itzik Seydoff as Grabbit the Rabbit
- Robert Hennig as Elmore Foxton III
- Shmulik Tene as Brinkley Bear and Rex Dog
- Niko Bar as Sneakly Snakely
- Eli Gorenstein as King Leonardo
- Shimon Cohen as Jorgen Jackal and Mortimer Mouse
- Yoav Heyman as Ralph Raccoon
- Gabi Keren as Gwendola Goose
- Ayelet Kurtz as Gilda Goose
- Esti Katz as Henrietta Hedgehog and Camellia Cow

== Episode list ==
- "Brain Of The Forest"
- "How To Ride A Fox"
- "Wanted: New Assistant Henchman": Elmore advertises for help and Sneakly applies. Grabbit outsmarts the fox and his new sidekick by introducing them to the "Snack-a-Snake".
- "Brinkley's Rabbit Trap"
- "Fool Those Frogs"
- "King For A Day"
- "All In The Bag"
- "Tunes For Raccoons": Vinnie and his brothers take a test set by Ralph, with assistance from Grabbit.
- "Share Or Be Square"
- "The Heavy Breathing Contest"
- "Sneakly's Dishonest Promise"
- "Let Sleeping Bears Lie": Brinkley Bear takes a break and goes into hibernation.
- "The Forest Frog Race"
