= Foxy Fables =

- Created by: FrameByFrame Studios
- Written by: Teddy Kempner; Andy Secombe
- Starring: Teddy Kempner; Andy Secombe
- Country of origin: Israel
- No. of episodes: 13

Production
- Running time: 5 minutes (approx.)

Original release
- Release: 1987 – 1988

Foxy Fables (known in Hebrew as משלים שועליים) is an animated television series produced by Israeli animator Rony Oren. All the characters were made from moulded plasticine modelling clay on metal armatures, and filmed with stop motion clay animation.

The plot of the series was based on fables by Aesop, La Fontaine, and others that feature forest animals acting out the famous stories. The situations are always based on the less strong animal succeeding in outsmarting the stronger one who tries to let him down. Every episode would end with a valuable moral. The program was originally created in Israel. 13 episodes were produced.

== Episode list ==
- The Crow and the Fox - After Cranium stole a hunk of cheese from Norris, Fox tricks him into singing.
- The Stick-Up - While Herman and his family are out of the house, Brixton sneaks in to eat their honey supply, but ended up being mistaken for a living bush.
- The Share Out - During the hunting season of rabbits, Elvis commands Herman to give him and Fox rations.
- Haute Cuisine or The Fox and the Stork - Fox invites Francine over for dinner as part of his scheme, until he got outsmarted by her.
- Unwelcome Guest - After Fox took over Brixton's house, Brixton needs help from Ding, Herman, and Giblet to get it back.
- In and Out of the Well - While trying to catch Cranium for his lunch, Fox falls into a well and hatches an escape plan.
- Laughing Spot - Brixton brought Fox and Herman to his "laughing spot", which is a wasps' nest.
- The Cake - When Crispin and Ding finds a lost cake, they decided to let Fox settle their differences.
- Strain the Brain - The gang tells stories about each other via clip show and Brixton challenges Herman to a tug of war.
- The Fishing Party - After Brixton refuses to go fishing with Fox, he plans to watch him and steal Fox's fish.
- Hang Up - Fox grew a cherry tree to restock his wine cellar, but the cherries keep getting eaten by Brixton and now, he must capture him before they disappear.
- Reflections of a Royal Dinner - King Elvis orders Jeremiah to have his subjects bring him food, until Brixton told Elvis a lie about another lion in the forest
- The Tar Doll - When Brixton says good morning to all his friends, he meets a doll made out of tar.

== The characters ==
Characters involved in the re-telling included:

- Fox the fox
- Giblet the rooster
- Cranium the crow
- Brixton the rabbit
- Herman the bear
- Crispin the cat
- Ding the dog
- Elvis the lion
- Udder the cow
- Francine the stork
- Tarquine the frog
- Jeremiah the jackal
- Hugsley the goat
- Lister the pig
- Flash the tortoise
- Norris the human
