= The Film that Wasn't =

הסרט שלא היה The Film that Wasn't
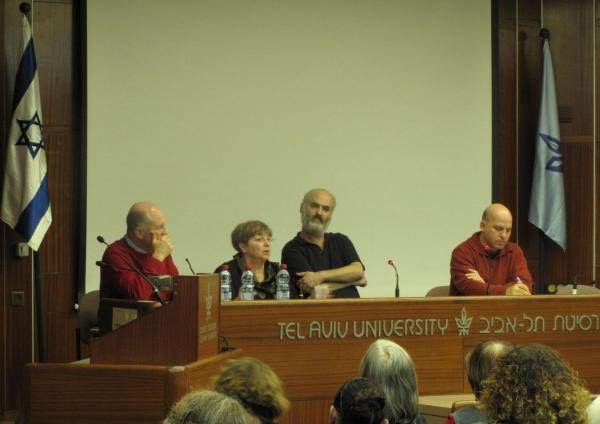
- Loevy (left) at the symposium in Tel Aviv University at which he delivered his talk on The Film that Wasn't.
- Directed by: Ram Loevy
- Written by: Ram Loevy
- Produced by: Liora Amir-Barmatz
- Cinematography: Yehiel Cohen
- Edited by: Liora Katziri; Tzippi Raz
- Distributed by: Israel Broadcasting Authority
- Release dates: 28 October 1993 (episode 1); 14 June 1994 (episode 2)
- Running time: 2 x 59 min.
- Country: Israel
- Languages: Hebrew, Arabic

The Film that Wasn't (הסרט שלא היה) is a two-part documentary series about interrogations in Israel and the Occupied Territories, including the use of torture in those interrogations. It aired on Israeli television in 1993 and 1994. The film was directed by Ram Loevy.

== Production ==
According to Loevy he was inspired to create the film in 1991, after reading the frequent accounts in the press of Palestinians being tortured during the First Intifada. He broached the idea with Yoseph Barel, who headed Israeli Television at the time, but was quickly rejected. The political climate in the country was not ripe for such a controversial film.

Things changed rapidly in 1992, when the left-leaning Alignment Party under Yitzhak Rabin defeated the Likud Party in the elections. Soon after the elections, Loevy was informed that his proposal had been approved. He immediately brought veteran producer Liora Amir-Barmatz on board, and began investigating the contentious topic.

It was at the point that Loevy and Amir-Barmatz decided that the series should consist of two distinct episodes. The first would focus on interrogations within the Green Line), mainly as committed by the Israeli police. The second episode would focus on torture in the West Bank and Gaza Strip, particularly as used by the Israel Defense Forces (IDF) and the Shabak (General Security Service) against Palestinian prisoners. They had planned for the two episodes to be aired over two consecutive weeks in order to highlight the intrinsic relationship between the ways torture was used in both geographic regions. Each episode would focus on many different cases of torture in order to underscore that torture was a common phenomenon in Israel, especially during the Second Intifada, in response to a spate of what was considered to be terrorist activities. Finally, they planned to be very clear that the cases they examined were real, and not some propaganda tool designed to malign Israel. All testimonies would be corroborated by multiple sources, and the body that conducted the torture would be offered a platform to respond to the charges. At the same time, they insisted that they would not accept generalities or whitewashing of the cases in lieu of an explanation.

At this time, they also decided to call the series The Film that Wasn't. In a review of the series that appeared in the newspaper Maariv, journalist Meir Schnitzer explained the name as follows:

The meaning of The Film that Wasn't is that everything said in it by the witnesses falls into the category of "never-was-and-never-happened," and all of it is nothing more than an eraser that does a murderous task on the public's awareness. With the sophistication of an experienced director, Loevy knows that things can be shouted out in the negative too—through silence.

Both episodes followed a similar format. Victims of torture by the Israeli authorities would give their testimonies, sometimes anonymously. The authorities' responses, often detailed but twisted, would then be presented silently within a slide on the screen.

=== Interrogation methods and victims ===
The film covered a wide range of techniques, both physical and mental, that were used to extract information. Many were known by Arabic names, indicating who the victims of torture were. Techniques described and recreated by the victims included:

- Zinzana, or severe isolation,
- Shabah, or being hogtied or bound in painful positions,
- Hazana, in which the victim is locked in a closet until he defecates in his clothing,
- Thalaja, or isolation in an icy room,
- The Banana, a form of being hogtied, ankles to wrists, while lying on one's back on a narrow bench,
- Sexual abuse,
- Beatings.

In at least one instance, the beatings were so severe that a victim, Hasan Zubeida, was left in a catatonic state ever since after fifteen days of interrogation. A statement by the Shin Bet, which appeared on a slide following shots of the crippled Zubeida, says that, "It has not been proven that his catatonia resulted from the interrogation.

=== The anonymous torturer ===
One of the most chilling aspects of the film is not the evidence of the victims, but the anonymous testimony of one of the perpetrators, whose identity was hidden and whose voice was altered to avoid retribution. To some, his testimony was reminiscent of what Hannah Arendt once described as the "banality of evil" in her 1963 book Eichmann in Jerusalem.

This anonymous torturer was a soldier in the reserves who served in the military police. Though he was originally supposed to provide security for the military interrogators, he was eventually seduced into participating in their activities, watching as they poured "something like acid" into the prisoners open wounds and beating them himself until his own hands hurt from clutching his truncheon so tightly and his ears rang with the screams of his victims.

== Release ==
The first episode of The Film that Wasn't aired on 28 October 1993, and the second episode was scheduled to air one week later, on November 4. It did not. While the film was approved by most of the senior officials at Israel Television, Moti Kirschenbaum, the new Director General of the Israel Broadcasting Authority (IBA), was determined to postpone the second episode even before the first episode was screened. He insisted that the police, the army, and the Shin Bet all be afforded an opportunity to respond to the charges again. This had always been the filmmakers' intention. Although the police and the Shin Bet did responded to each of the testimonies, the IDF refused to respond to the account of the anonymous reservist who had participated in the torture.

Loevy and his crew had hoped to obtain the responses of the military torturers themselves, and were even prepared to mask their identities. When this was rejected by the IDF, the film crew compromised and was prepared to accept a written statement instead. Yet even this was not forthcoming. Meanwhile, the "anonymous torturer" wanted to confront the IDF with what happened, and was prepared to testify before the Military Advocate General, provided that he would be promised anonymity. The army refused to grant him this.

This was followed by several months of intense negotiations between the IBA and the IDF. Loevy wanted to air the film and announce that the military had refused to comment. He argued that it was the IBA's responsibility, and that they would not provide the same exemption for any other group. Kirschenbaum refused, most likely on the grounds that the army is not just "another group." It is ultimately responsible for Israel's security. After many long months, the IDF finally relented. The anonymous reservist gave a deposition to a representative of the Military Advocate's office, and a few days later the IDF responded. The response included a promise to conduct an official investigation into the allegations. With this in hand, episode 2 was aired on 14 June 2004, almost eight months after the first episode.

== Reception ==
Ironically, The Film that Wasn't evoked a more impassioned response when it was being made than after it was aired. During the making of the film, in 1993, Loevy was awarded Israel's highest honor, the Israel Prize, for his lifetime of contributions to Israeli television. The next day, the headline on the front page of Yediot Ahronot newspaper read, "Israel Prize Winner Making Film about the Secret Service's 'Torture Chambers.'"

The use of torture had long been a hot-button issue in Israel, and in 1987, an official commission headed by the former President of the Supreme Court Moshe Landau ruled that "moderate physical pressure" might sometimes be necessary as an interrogation tool. While that ruling gained considerable attention, the precise definition of "moderate physical pressure" appeared in a second report that remained secret. In other words, while severe forms of torture, such as waterboarding, were likely illegal under the Landau Commission's ruling, "moderate" physical and psychological pressure could be applied to detainees. To those who supported the use of torture to obtain vital information, it appeared as if Loevy was undermining even that. In his introductory remarks to a 2006 retrospective on Loevy's work, Aner Preminger noted that:

The Israeli establishment had no choice but to embrace Loevy and grant him the Israel Prize in 1993, but even this did not succeed in silencing his penetrating voice and lightening his uncompromising perspective on Israeli society. When the Israeli left was in a state of euphoria and convinced that it had taken over the government, Ram Loevy made a subversive film for Israeli television, daring for the first time to touch on and shake up the taboo of silence surrounding the torture of security detainees by the Shin Bet.

Loevy, however, adopted a more modest approach to his film, saddened by what he terms the apathy with which his film was received. On the other hand, he is eager to point out that the very film that took on the most powerful forces in the Israeli establishment—the metaphorical "sacred cows" of national security and the groups such as the IDF and the Shin Bet responsible for security—was funded by a state-run television channel.

Looking back on the entire incident, I now find it fascinating and somehow uplifting that the public broadcasting network in Israel agreed to finance and broadcast a film that investigated the horrors inflicted by Israeli forces on the Palestinians. I wonder how many other countries would have agreed to do that.

Nevertheless, at a 2009 symposium in Tel Aviv, he also noted that the IDF has yet to fulfill its promise to the "anonymous torturer" that it would conduct an official investigation into his charges.
