= Batya Gur =

Israeli writer (1947–2005)

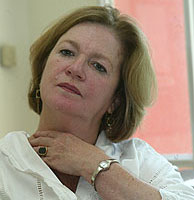
- Gur in 2003
- Native name: בתיה גור
- Born: 1 September 1947 Tel Aviv, Israel
- Died: 19 May 2005 (aged 57) Jerusalem, Israel
- Occupation: Novelist; literary critic
- Genre: Crime fiction
- Years active: 1988–2005

Batya Gur (Hebrew: בתיה גור; 1 September 1947 – 19 May 2005) was an Israeli novelist. Her specialty was detective fiction. She was a 1994 recipient of the Prime Minister's Prize for Hebrew Literary Works.

== Biography ==
Batya Gur was born in Tel Aviv in 1947 to parents who survived the Holocaust. She earned a master's degree in Hebrew literature from the Hebrew University of Jerusalem. Between 1971 and 1975 Batya lived in Greensboro, NC, where she taught Hebrew and Jewish studies to elementary students at the North Carolina Hebrew Academy at Greensboro (now called B'nai Shalom Day School). Before writing her first detective novel at the age of 39, she taught literature at the Hebrew University Secondary School. Gur was also a literary critic for Haaretz newspaper.

== Literary career ==
In 1988 she began writing a series starring the character of police detective Michael Ohayon: an educated, pensive, and intellectual detective. Five sequels ensued. The first book was adapted as a film for Israeli television. In every book in the series Michael Ohayon enters a closed world, an isolated society, with rules of its own (for example psychoanalysts, literary scholars in academia, or members of a kibbutz). By his fundamental approach and his inner understanding of human nature, Ohayon succeeds in breaking the ring of silence and solving the murder mystery on his way to the next book.

== Critical acclaim ==
Gur's crime novels were described as "less about the death of the body than...sustained, thoughtful explorations of the life of the mind."

== Death ==
On 19 May 2005, Gur died of lung cancer in Jerusalem at the age of 57. She was buried at Har HaMenuchot.

== Published works ==
=== In English translation ===
- 1992 The Saturday morning murder: a psychoanalytic case (ISBN 9780060190248)
- 1993 Literary murder: a critical case (ISBN 9780060190231)
- 1994 Murder on a kibbutz: a communal case (ISBN 9780060190262)
- 2000 Murder duet: a musical case (ISBN 9780060932985)
- 2004 Bethlehem Road murder: A Michael Ohayon mystery (ISBN 9780060195731)
- 2006 Murder in Jerusalem: A Michael Ohayon mystery (ISBN 9780060852948)

=== In Hebrew ===
- 1990 Next to the Hunger Road (essays)
- 1994 I Didn't Imagine it Would Be This Way
- 1998 Stone for Stone
- 1999 A Spy in the House
- 2000 Requiem for Humility or Living in Jerusalem

== See also ==
- Women of Israel
