= List of programs broadcast by Israeli Educational Television =

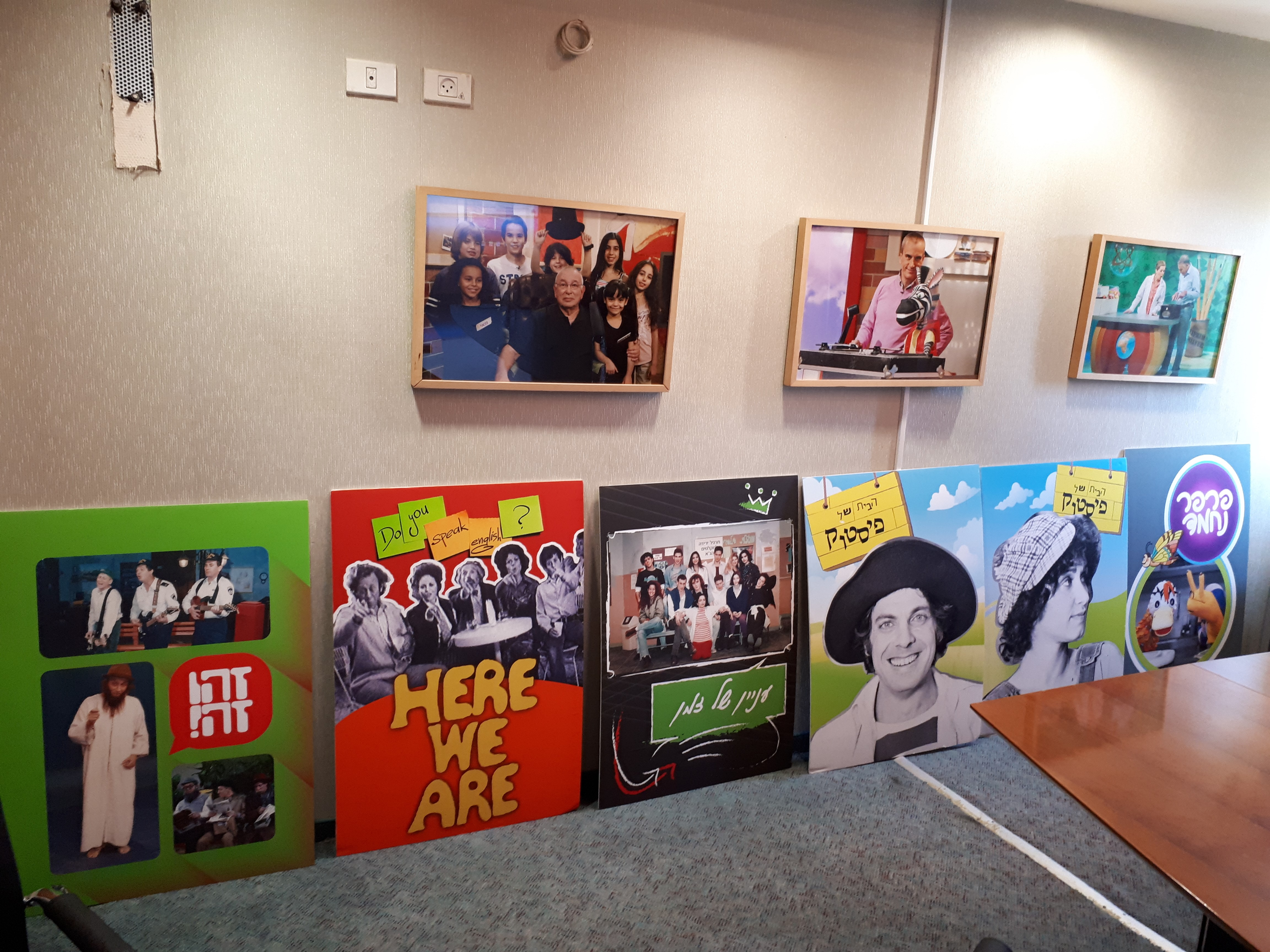
Posters of various shows on IETV. Photo taken at IETV's building meeting room in Tel Aviv, April 2018.

This is a list of programs broadcast on Israeli Educational Television, a former television station.

== IETV productions ==
This is a list of prominent shows formerly broadcast on IETV.

=== Youth shows ===
- Ani Gitara (אני גיטרה)
- Avudim BaRibuaa (אבודים בריבוע)
- BaBait Shel Fistuk (בבית של פיסטוק)
- Bahatzer Shel Pupik (בחצר של פופיק)
- BaHeder Shel Hanny (בחדר של חני)
- Beit Sefer LeKosmim (בית ספר לקוסמים)
- BeSod HaYinyanim (בסוד העניינים)
- Bli Sodot (בלי סודות)
- Cheshbon Pashoot (חשבון פשוט)
- Dan VeMuesli (דן ומוזלי)
- Dovale (דובל'ה)
- Esrim Plus (עשרים פלוס)
- Galileo (גלילאו)
- Gaon Shel Aba (גאון של אבא)
- HaEepron Hatchi Mehudad (העיפרון הכי מחודד)
- HaHafsaka HaGdola (ההפסקה הגדולה)
- HaOtzar Shelanu (האוצר שלנו)
- HaPlantonim (הפלנטונים)
- HaYeladim MiSchoonat Hayim (הילדים משכונת חיים)
- Hayot Bama (חיות במה)
- Hayot Bama Live! (חיות במה בהופעה)
- Helem BaHelem (חלם בהלם)
- Inyan Shel Zman (עניין של זמן)
- Keshet VeAnan (קשת וענן)
- Knesset Nichbada (כנסת נכבדה)
- Kriyat Kivun (קריאת כיוון)
- Ma HaDibur (מה הדיבור)
- Ma HaSipur? (מה הסיפור?)
- Ma Pitom?! (!?מה פתאום)
- Ma Ze Muze (מה זה מוזה)
- Matti HaBalash HaMathemati (מתי בלש מתמטי)
- Mi Ba LeKishkashta (מי בא לקישקשתא?)
- Olam HaBubot Shel Gali (עולם הבובות של גלי)
- Parpar Nechmad (פרפר נחמד)
- Philo VeSophy (פילו וסופי)
- Rechov Sumsum (רחוב סומסום)
- Rega im Dodley (רגע עם דודלי)
- Roeem 6/6 (רואים 6/6)
- Shooster VeShooster (שוסטר ושוסטר)
- Shraga Bishgada (שרגא בישגדא)
- Tiruu Oti (תראו אותי)
- Tzemer VeYaeli (צמר ויעלי)
- Yaldey Beit HaEtz (ילדי בית העץ)

=== Culture shows ===
- Kesher Mishpachti (קשר משפחתי)
- Sh'at Kosher (שעת כושר)
- Zombit (זומביט)

=== Comedy shows ===
- Ahat SheYodaat (אחת שיודעת)
- Chatzi HaMenashe (חצי המנשה)
- Domino (דומינו)
- HaChafranim (החפרנים)
- Kan VaOman (כאן ואומן)
- Krovim Krovim (קרובים קרובים)
- Mitahat LaOr (מתחת לעור)
- Platfus (פלטפוס)
- Sha'aruriya (שערורייה)
- Shubu Shel HaSheriff (שובו של השריף)
- Tarich Achura (תריץ אחורה)
- Zehu Ze! (זהו זה!)

=== Talmud study shows ===
- Shnaim Ohazin (שנים אוחזין)

=== English learning shows ===
- The Adventures of Scooterman
- The Amazing World of Dr. Halfbaked
- Candy Can Do It
- Debby in Hospital
- English English English
- Gabi and Debby
- Here We Are
- Neighbours
- Seven in Heaven
- The Sheriff of Hollywood Hills
- Signal C.Q
- Sing a Song

=== Quiz shows ===
- Pitsuchim (פיצוחים)
- Tik-Tak (תיק-תק)
- Tofsim Kav (תופסים קו)

=== Road safety shows ===
- Bulbul HaKabulbul (בולבול הקבולבול)
- Danny Dina (דני דינה)
- Delet Haksamim (דלת הקסמים)
- Doberman HaHebreman (הדוברמן החברמן)

=== Current affairs shows ===
- Erev Hadash (ערב חדש)
- Hakol Anashim (הכל אנשים)
- Tik Tikshoret (תיק תקשורת)

=== Hosting shows ===
- Chotze Yisrael (חוצה ישראל)
- Klafim Ptuchim (קלפים פתוחים)
- Mabat Nashi (מבט נשי)

== Imported TV shows broadcast on IETV ==
=== Children's ===
- 3-2-1 Penguins
- Adventures of the Little Mermaid
- The Adventures of Peter Pan
- Alfred J. Kwak
- Amigo and Friends
- Angelina Ballerina
- Angelina Ballerina: The Next Steps
- Archibald le Magi-chien
- The Babaloos
- Babar
- Baby Follies
- Bananas in Pyjamas
- Bangers and Mash
- Barney
- Bear in the Big Blue House
- The Bear's Island
- Beat Bugs
- Bertha
- The Big Garage
- The Blobs
- Bo on the Go
- Bob the Builder
- Bobobobs
- Boffins
- Boule et Bill
- Budgie the Little Helicopter
- Bug Alert
- Bumpety Boo
- Busy Buses
- Calimero
- The Caribou Kitchen
- Chapi Chapo
- Charlie and Lola
- Christopher Crocodile
- Colargol
- Connie the Cow
- Cushion Kids
- Delfy and His Friends
- Dino Babies
- Dinosaur Train
- Dr Otter
- Edward and Friends
- Faerie Tale Theatre
- The Fairytaler
- Fiddley Foodle Bird
- The Forgotten Toys
- Fraggle Rock
- The Funny Company
- Funnybones
- Gordon the Garden Gnome
- Happily Ever After: Fairy Tales for Every Child
- Hello Kitty and Friends
- Here Comes the Grump
- Holly the Ghost
- Huckleberry no Bōken
- Inspector Gadget
- It's Punky Brewster
- Ivor the Engine
- Jay Jay the Jet Plane
- Jim Henson's Animal Show
- Jim Henson's Mother Goose Stories
- Jimbo and the Jet Set
- Joe the Little Boom Boom
- Johnson and Friends
- Jungle Ted and the Lacy Button Poppers
- Kassai and Leuk
- Keroppi and Friends
- King Rollo
- Kissyfur
- Kitty Cats
- The Legend of Snow White
- The Littl' Bits
- Little Wizards
- Little Women
- The Magic Key
- Magic Mountain
- Martha Speaks
- Mathmatazz
- Mīmu Iro Iro Yume no Tabi
- Moomins
- Mopatop's Shop
- Mr. Men and Little Miss
- Mrs. Pepper Pot
- Nanook
- The New Adventures of Ocean Girl
- Nilus the Sandman
- The Ollie & Moon Show
- Once Upon a Time... Life
- Once Upon a Time... Man
- Oscar's Orchestra
- Oswald
- Ox Tales
- Papa Beaver's Storytime
- Parasol Henbē
- The Perishers
- Pirates: Adventures in Art
- The Poddington Peas
- Polka Dot Shorts
- The Pondles
- Postman Pat
- Potamus Park
- Raggs
- The Raggy Dolls
- Ready Jet Go!
- Really Wild Animals
- Rimba's Island
- Rubbish, King of the Jumble
- Saban’s Gulliver’s Travels
- The Secret Show
- Shaun the Sheep
- Shelldon
- Shelly T. Turtle Show
- The Shoe People
- The Silver Brumby
- The Slow Norris
- The Smurfs
- Splash and Bubbles
- Starhill Ponies
- Storybook International
- Taotao
- Teddybears
- Thomas & Friends
- A Thousand and One... Americas
- Tip en Tap
- Tots TV
- Towser
- TV Colosso
- Vision On
- Wil Cwac Cwac
- The Winjin Pom
- Wisdom of the Gnomes
- The Wizard of Oz
- The Wonderful Wizard of Oz
- WordWorld
- The World of David the Gnome
- The Wubbulous World of Dr. Seuss
- Zack & Quack

=== TV series ===
- A.J.'s Time Travelers
- Ark II
- Barriers
- Beau Geste
- Blizzard Island
- Breakers
- The Champions
- Children's Ward
- Chocky
- The Coral Island
- Crossbow
- Dick Turpin
- Falcon Island
- The Famous Five
- Five Mile Creek
- Gavilan
- Golden Pennies
- Jack Holborn
- Just William
- Katts and Dog
- Knights of God
- Lost
- The Lost Islands
- Mad Men
- Mission: Impossible
- Mom P.I.
- Murphy's Mob
- The Paper Lads
- Primus
- The Prisoner
- Rags to Riches
- Science Max
- The Secrets of Isis
- Seven Brides for Seven Brothers
- Sidekicks
- Skippy the Bush Kangaroo
- Star Trek: The Next Generation
- Star Trek: The Original Series
- The Storyteller
- T. and T.
- A Tale of Two Cities
- Thunderbirds
- The Time Tunnel
- Tom Grattan's War
- Waterloo Road
- The West Wing

=== Sitcoms ===
- ALF
- All Together Now
- The Charmings
- The Comedy Company
- Dad
- Day by Day
- Eric's World
- Full House
- The Golden Girls
- Happy Days
- Hey Dad..!
- Just the Ten of Us
- Kate & Allie
- Me and My Girl
- The Mommies
- My Secret Identity
- My Sister Sam
- Parker Lewis Can't Lose
- The Peter Principle
- Sister, Sister
- Small Wonder
- Soap
- That '70s Show
- The Wonder Years
- You Can't Take It with You
