= Yuval Segal =

Israeli actor (born 1971)

- יובל סגל
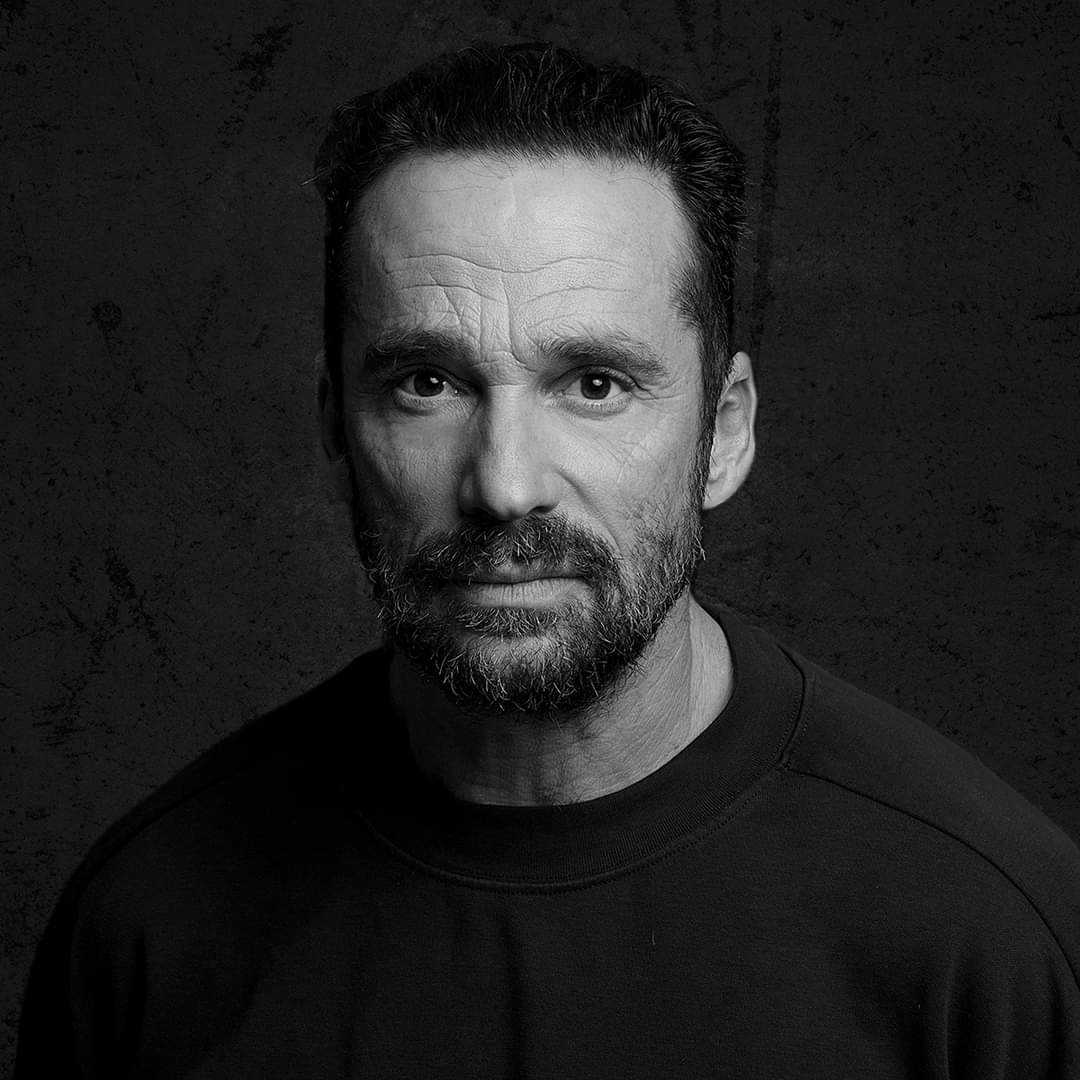
- Born: 6 December 1971 (age 54); Yuval, Israel
- Education: Yoram Loewenstein Performing Arts Studio
- Occupations: Actor; comedian; model
- Years active: 1996–present
- Spouse: Maya Yisrael
- Children: 3

Yuval Segal (Hebrew: יובל סגל; born 6 December 1971) is an Israeli actor. Regarded as one of the best performers of his generation in Israel, he is recognized for his versatile work across independent films, television and the stage. In 2003, he earned a Best Actor nomination from the Israeli Academy of Film and Television for his role in Dover Koshashvili's drama film, Matana MiShamayim. He is known to international audiences for his role as Moreno in the thriller series, Fauda.

== Early life ==
Segal was born in Afula, Israel, to a Jewish family. During his childhood, his family moved to Kfar Saba. In his youth, he competed in fencing. His grandfather, Eliezer Kagan, was a poet and a translator, and his aunt is the actress T'hia Danon. Segal is named after his uncle, corporal Yuval Shmueli, who died in the sinking of the INS Dakar Israeli Navy submarine.

== Career ==
In the middle of the 1990s, Segal started modeling for clothing companies, including Hamashbir Lazarchan. He also took part in many commercials. In 1996, he won the award for the model of the year.

In 1997, Segal began studying at the Yoram Loewenstein Performing Arts Studio. During his first year of study, he received his first television part in the series Deep Blue, which was broadcast on Channel 2. In 1998, he portrayed Dani Joani in a small part on the Channel 2 sitcom Shemesh. That year he also started acting on Tironut (Boot Camp) as Roei Mamman. Segal also appeared in many plays at Habima Theater and Beit Lessin Theater. At acting school, he also appeared in a production of Hanoch Levin's play, Winter Funeral.

In 1999, he appeared in the film Zman Avir as Micha. One of his most significant roles was in Dover Kosashvili's 2003 drama film Matana MiShamayim, alongside Lior Ashkenazi, in which he starred as Vaja. His work in the film earned him an Ophir Award nomination for Best Actor. In the film, Segal was required to appear in a full-frontal nude scene.

In 2005, he starred as Yaki alongside Alon Abutbul in the film Lirkod (Dance). That same year he also began appearing in the sketch comedy series Ktsarim. In 2006, Segal portrayed Elisha Ben David in HOT's Parashat Hashavua. That year he also appeared on the sitcom Ha-Chaim Ze Lo Hacol as Ehud, a dance teacher.

In 2010, Segal starred as Yigal Levi in Taxi Driver, a comedy-drama tv series that he created and wrote. The series was broadcast on yes Drama, and due to the show's success, it was later broadcast on Channel 2. In 2014, he appeared as Doctor Gavish in the second season of the drama television series Yellow Peppers. Later that year he portrayed Boaz in the comedy-drama film Zero Motivation. In July 2014, he began portraying Professor Landau in Metim LeRega.

In 2015, he began playing the role of Moreno, a commander of a Mista'arvim unit, in yes's political thriller television series Fauda. Segal's character was killed off in the second season of the show, a decision that Segal attributed to disagreements he had with first season director, Assaf Bernstein. Liat Benasuly, a Fauda producer, said that the character was instead killed for creative reasons: "There is no connection between the death of Yuval's character and the difficulties he experienced on the set...It is a decision that is rooted in the plot and the script that must be kicking, surprising and original. Yuval Segal is one of the best actors in Israel and we appreciate him for his part in the series."

In 2018, he starred in Avi Nesher's drama film, The Other Story, alongside Sasson Gabai, Nathan Goshen and Joy Rieger.

In 2019, he played Asi in the Reshef Levi-created drama, Nehama on HOT.

Since 2008, together with Keren Mor, he has appeared in advertising campaigns for the credit card company Leumi Card.

== Personal life ==
Segal is married to Maya Yisraeli, and they have three children.

== Filmography ==
Year	Title	Role	Notes
1997	Kachol Amok (Deep Blue)	Yuval	9 episodes
1997	Shemesh	Danny Joani	1 episode
1999	Zman Avir	Micha	Film
2000	Tironoot	Lt. Ro'i Maman	1 episode
2003	Matana MiShamayim (A Gift from Above)	Vaja	Film; Dir. Dover Koshashvili
2004	Hayta Li Yaldut Meusheret (I Had a Wonderful Childhood)	The teacher	Film; Dir. Ori Sivan
2004	Ktsarim (Shorts)	Yuval	3 episodes
2006	Lirkod (The Belly Dancer)	Romano	Film; Dir. Marek Rozenbaum
2006-2009	Parashat Ha-Shavua (On Any Sunday)	Elisha Ben-David	Series regular
2006-2011	Ha-Chaim Ze Lo Ha-Kol (Life Isn't Everything)	Ehud Tal	14 episodes
2007	Ein La Elohim (She's Got It)	Kobi	Film; Dir. Jacob Goldwasser
2008	Hakol Mat'hil Bayam (It All Begins at Sea)	Shmuel	Film; Dir. Eitan Green
2010	Taxi Driver	Igal Levi	Series regular
2011	Another Earth	Television reporter	
2014	Zero Motivation	Boaz, Base Commander	Film; Dir. Talya Lavie
2014-2017	Metim LeRega (Temporarily Dead)	Prof. Yaron Landau	Series regular
2016	Hadrei habait (Indoors)	Avraham	Film; Dir. Eitan Green
2016	Sofsheli	Meir Schechter	Series regular
2018	Holiday	Bobby	Film; Dir. Isabella Eklöf
2018	Golden State	Reuven Berman	Film; Dir. Jonathan Avigdori & Rani Sa'ar
2018	The Other Story	Yonatan Abadi	Film; Dir. Avi Nesher
2018	Pilgrim	Jonathan	Film; Dir. Julian Jakobsmeyer
2019	Nehama	Asi	Series regular
2019	BatEl HaBetula (Batel the Virgin)	Itzik Mesuka	Series regular
2019	HaAchbar (The Mouse)		Short film
2021	Rising	Goran	Series regular
2022	Start New Game	Avishai	Short film
2023	Checkout (Kupa Rashit)	Itzik	1 episode
2023	Full Speed	Eddie Segev	Series regular
2024	Haim's Story		Film; Dir. Tova Ascher
