= Moni Moshonov =

Israeli actor, comedian and theater director (born 1951)

- מוני מושונוב
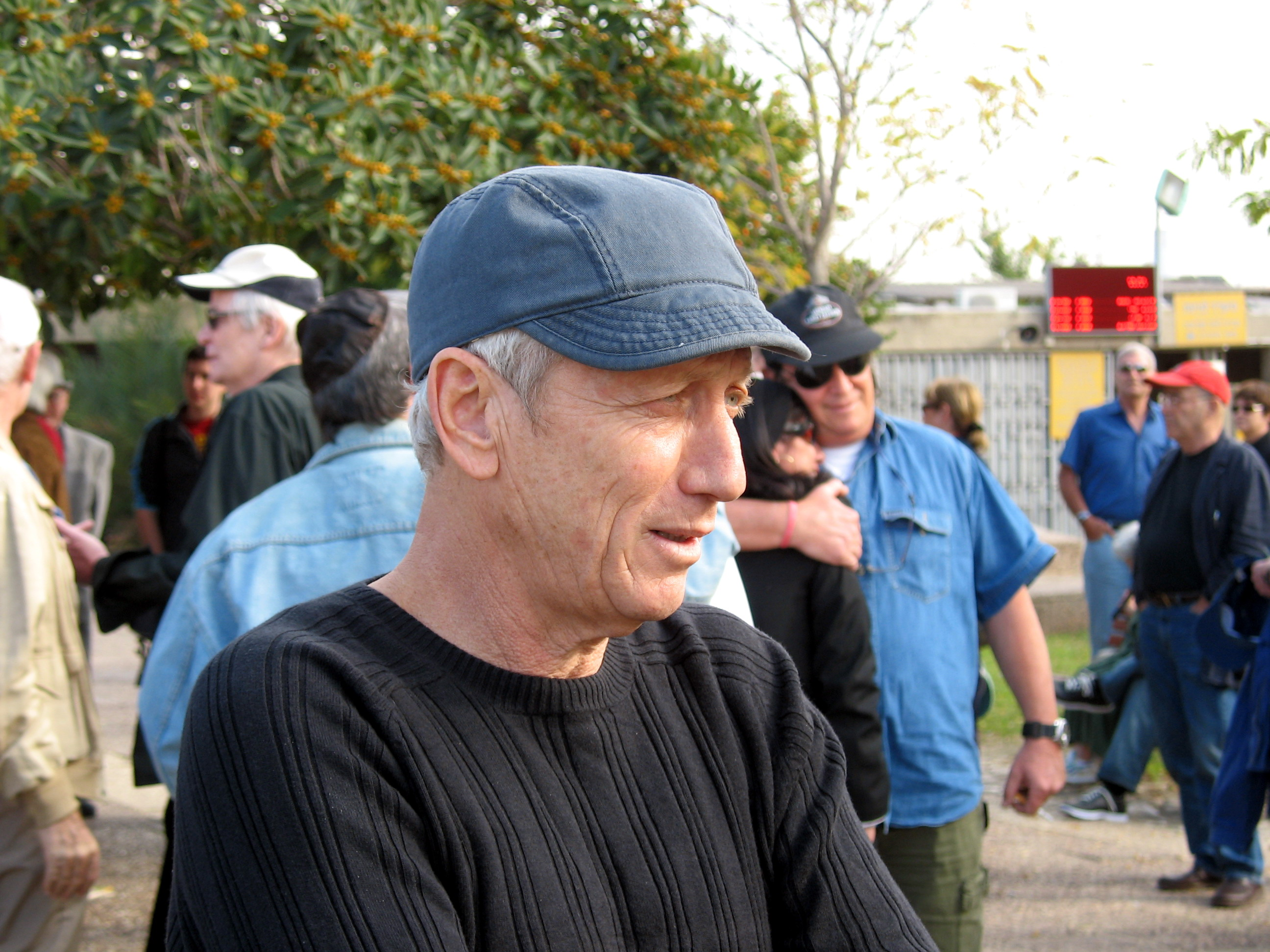
- Moshonov in 2006
- Born: Shlomo Moshonov; 18 August 1951 (age 75); Ramla, Israel
- Occupations: Actor, comedian, theatre director
- Years active: 1977–present
- Spouse: Sandra Sade
- Children: Alma Moshonov, Michael Moshonov
- Awards: Ophir Award; 2001 Late Marriage – Yasha Ophir Award; 2005 Ktsarim

Shlomo "Moni" Moshonov (Hebrew: שלמה "מוני" מושונוב; born 18 August 1951) is an Israeli actor, comedian, and theater director.

== Early life ==
Moshonov was born in Ramla, Israel, to a Bulgarian Jewish family that immigrated to Israel from Sofia, Bulgaria. His father, Moshe, who studied law in Sofia, sold textiles at the Ramla market. Moshonov grew up in Ramla. He did his military service in an Israel Defense Forces entertainment troupe.

== Career ==
=== Acting ===
After studying drama at Tel Aviv University, he joined the Haifa Theater, remaining with the group for five years. In 1977 he made his first film appearance in Masa Alunkot ("Journey of Stretchers") alongside Gidi Gov.

In 1978–98, Moshonov starred along with Shlomo Bar-Aba, Dov Glickman, Gidi Gov and many more in the Israeli satirical TV show Zehu Ze!, first on Israeli Educational Television and then Channel 2. He also appeared in the films The Man Who Flew in to Grab (1981), Every Time We Say Goodbye (1986) and Deadline (1987). During the 1980s he starred in five "Festigal" song festivals, performing children's songs. He also starred in Arik Einstein's children's video Like Grownups in 1991. In 1992 he wrote, produced and starred in the film Cables.

He has appeared in many theater plays in the Cameri Theater, Habima and the Beit Lessin Theater, as well as several entertainment shows with Baraba. In 2006 he directed Ideal Wedding at Habima and starred in The Goat: or, Who Is Sylvia?

=== Film and television ===
The 1992 Israeli parody film Cables was scripted by Arik Einstein, Moni Moshonov, and Zvi Shissel. It is a collection of sketches, with the frame story being a guy (played by Einstein) flipping cable TV channels.

In 2000 he starred in Besame Mucho and in Dover Kosashvili's Late Marriage in 2001, for which he won the Israeli Film Academy Award for best supporting actor. In 2002 he starred in Amos Gitai's Kedma. In 2003 he played in Kosashvili's next film A Gift from Above, and starred in Year Zero. In 2004 he joined the sketch show Ktzarim on the Channel 2, for which he won an Israeli Film Academy Award for best actor in a comedy series, and in 2007 he hosted the Israeli version of Thank God You're Here on Channel 10. In 2006 he starred in Forgiveness ("Mechilot") and in We Own the Night in 2007. In 2008 he joined the cast of the second season of Betipul, and starred in Two Lovers.

In 2012 he played in the Israeli TV series, The Gordin Cell as Peter Yom-Tov, an old Shin-Bet agent from Bulgaria. He co-starred as Nick in the 2013 movie Hunting Elephants. In the same year, he appeared in Shraga Bishgada, an Israeli TV show.

In 2014 he played in the Bulgarian film Bulgarian Rhapsody, which became the Bulgarian entry for the Best Foreign Language Film at the 87th Academy Awards.

In 2015 he portrayed former Bank of Israel governor Stanley Fischer in a controversial TV ad campaign for Amir Bramly's Kela fund, which was broadcast in Prime time including the "Golden Break" before the winner announcement in two high rating reality shows.

In 2020, he appeared in the reboot of Zehu Ze! and The Jews are Coming.

== Personal life ==
Moshonov has been married since 1977 to actress Sandra Sade, and is the father of opera singer Alma Moshonov and actor and musician Michael Moshonov.

He resides in Tel Aviv.
