= Ktsarim =

Israeli sketch comedy series

- Written by: Guy Ben Haim; Shay Michelson; Shmulik Levy; Omri Marcus; Keren Mor
- Directed by: Rani Sa'ar
- Starring: Moni Moshonov; Keren Mor; Shmulik Levy; Riki Blich; Yuval Segal
- Opening theme: "Hir Aj Kam Hir Aj Go" by Magnifico (seasons 1-3) "Wheel of Fortune" by Hans Zimmer (season 4)
- Ending theme: "Hir Aj Kam Hir Aj Go" by Magnifico
- Country of origin: Israel
- Original language: Hebrew
- No. of seasons: 4
- No. of episodes: 32

Production
- Running time: approx. 30 minutes
- Production company: Gil Productions

Original release
- Network: Channel 2 (Telad, Reshet)
- Release: December 2004 – 2009

Ktsarim (Hebrew: קצרים, Shorts) was an Israeli sketch comedy series broadcast on Channel 2.

== History ==
Ktzarim was based on the British comedy show The Sketch Show. The show debuted in 2004 and is similar to Israeli satirical sketch shows, like Eretz Nehederet and Zehu Ze!. It is composed of a series of sketches, often with a punch line at the end.

== Cast ==
The show features:

- Moni Moshonov (מוני מושונוב)
- Keren Mor (קרן מור)
- Shmulik Levy (שמוליק לוי)
- Riki Blich (ריקי בליך)
- Yuval Segal (יובל סגל)
