= Matana MiShamayim =

A Gift from Above
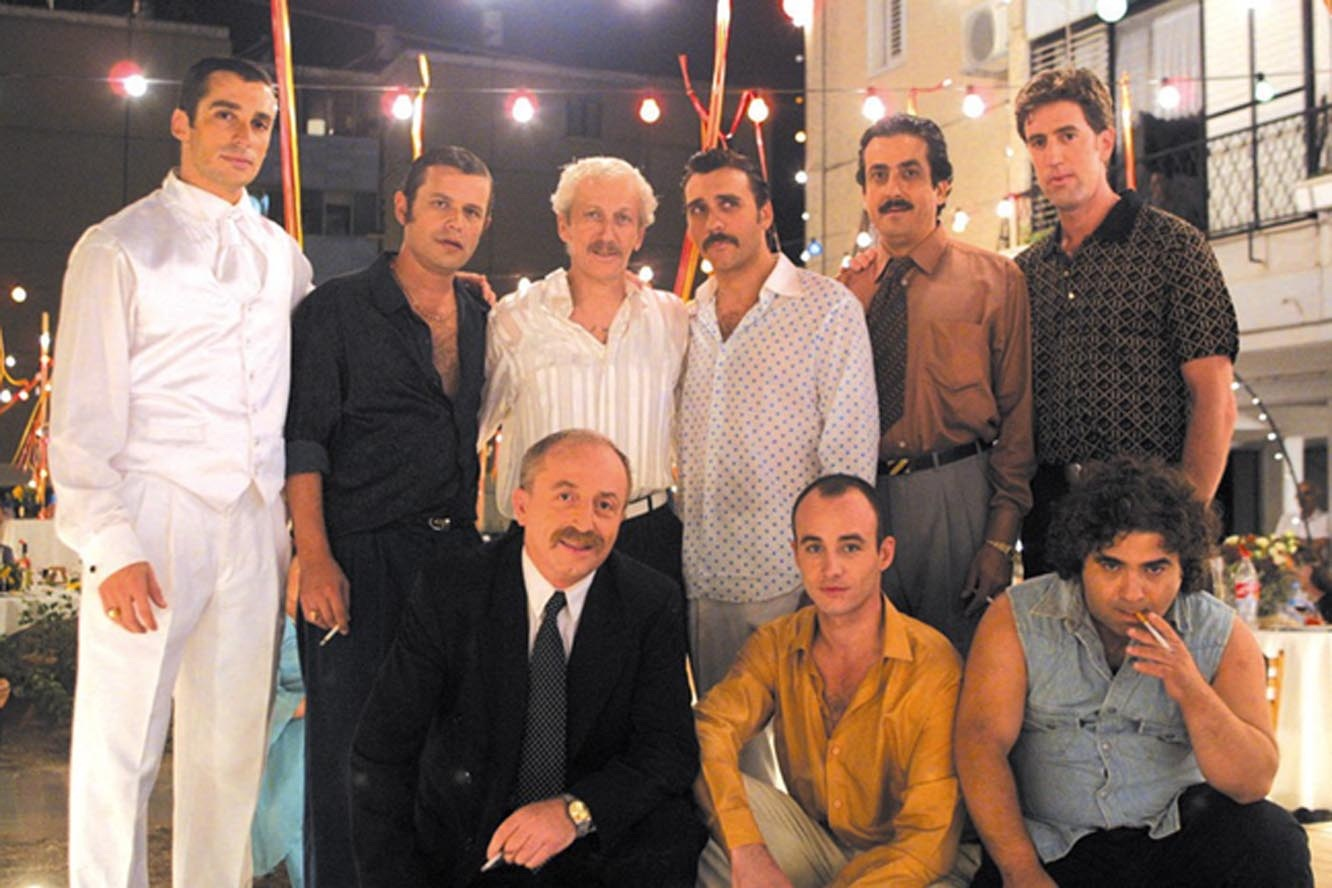
- The movie's male actors
- Directed by: Dover Kosashvili
- Written by: Dover Kosashvili (Dubi Rubinstein)
- Produced by: Marek Rozenbaum
- Starring: Yuval Segal; Rami Heuberger; Moni Moshonov; Lior Ashkenazi; Ronit Yudkevitz; Dover Kosashvili; Menashe Noy; Ania Bukstein
- Cinematography: Laurent Dailland
- Edited by: Yael Perlov
- Music by: Ioseb Bardanashvili
- Distributed by: Israel Film Fund; Transfax; Keshet Broadcasting
- Release date: December 2003
- Running time: 108 minutes
- Country: Israel
- Languages: Hebrew; Judaeo-Georgian
- Budget: 12.7 M NIS

A Gift from Above (Hebrew: מתנה משמיים, romanized: Matana MiShamayim, lit. a gift from the sky) is a 2003 Israeli drama film, directed by Dover Kosashvili.

== History ==
The dialogue on this film is partly in the Judaeo-Georgian language and partly in Hebrew. And since the Judaeo-Georgian language is a dialect, spoken by a small community, most of the cast had to learn it for this production. It was Becky Griffin's debut film. The movie was a nominee to the Ophir Award in 11 categories.

== Plot ==
The characters on this movie live like a closed tribe. Most of them live on the same block. Among themselves they speak a rare language. They put a lot of pressure on each other to get married only within their community. They are not much concerned about obeying the country's laws. And many of them work in the same place, Ben Gurion Airport luggage department, or help their community members, who do work there, to steal passengers' suitcases.

The community is economically disadvantaged but has a rich folklore and social life characterized by frequent celebrations and episodes of conflict and violence. A major event in the narrative is a plan developed by members of the community steal diamond cargoes from aircraft. The plan also involves framing two volunteers from within the community for the thefts.

== Cast ==
- Yuval Segal as Vajha
- Rami Heuberger as Bakho
- Moni Moshonov as Giorgi
- Lior Ashkenazi as Otri
- Dover Kosashvili as Jamali
- Ronit Yudkevitz as Margo
- Menashe Noy as Ponchika
- Becky Griffin as Kato
- Orit Sher as Tsiala
- Yael Pearl Becker as Tamariko
- Alon Neuman as Rezo
- Anastasia Kovalenko as Fira
- Rotem Zissman as Marita
- Ania Bukstein as Marina
