= Stockholm (TV series) =

Stockholm (Hebrew: שטוקהולם) is an Israeli dark comedy-drama television series created by Noa Yedlin, based on her novel of the same name. Developed by Artza Productions, the series premiered in 2018 on Israel's Channel 11 and Channel 12, and it was featured at the Toronto International Film Festival. Running for two seasons, the series won Best Scripted Format at the International Format Awards in 2021.

The narrative follows a group of longtime friends in their seventies who discover that their companion, a prominent economist and top contender for the Nobel Prize, has died in his sleep. To ensure he receives the honor, the group decides to conceal his death and maintain the illusion that he is alive until the official announcement. The ensemble cast features veteran Israeli actors, including Sasson Gabai, Gidi Gov, Dov Glickman, Tiki Dayan, and Liora Rivlin.
