= Late Marriage =

2001 film by Dover Kosashvili

- Directed by: Dover Kosashvili
- Written by: Dover Kosashvili
- Produced by: Marek Rozenbaum; Edgard Tenenbaum
- Starring: Lior Ashkenazi; Ronit Elkabetz; Moni Moshonov; Lili Kosashvili
- Cinematography: Daniel Schneor
- Edited by: Yael Perlov
- Music by: Josef Bardanashvili
- Release date: 17 May 2001
- Running time: 102 minutes
- Countries: Israel; France
- Languages: Judaeo-Georgian; Hebrew

Late Marriage (Hebrew: חתונה מאוחרת, Hatuna Meuheret) is a 2001 Israeli film directed by Dover Kosashvili. The film centers on Zaza (Lior Ashkenazi, in his breakthrough role), the 31-year-old child of tradition-minded Georgian Jewish immigrants who are anxiously trying to arrange a marriage for him. Unbeknownst to them, he is secretly dating a 34-year-old divorcée, Judith (Ronit Elkabetz). When his parents discover the relationship and violently intervene, Zaza must choose between his family traditions and his love.

Most of the main characters are Georgian-Israeli and the dialogue is partly in the Judaeo-Georgian language and partly in Hebrew.

The film was positively reviewed and was Israel's submission for Best Foreign Language Film at the 74th Academy Awards, but it was not nominated.

== Plot ==
Zaza is a 31-year-old Georgian-Israeli PhD student at Tel Aviv University whose family is trying to arrange a marriage for him within the Georgian community. Zaza and his parents, Yasha and Lili, visit the home of a possible match, Ilana, who is 17 and still in high school. No decision is made, and it is mentioned that he has already seen about a hundred prospective brides.

After dropping his parents off at their apartment building, Zaza drives to a pay phone and calls his girlfriend Judith, a 34-year-old Moroccan-Israeli divorcée he is dating without his parents' knowledge. After Judith's daughter Madona has gone to bed (Judith is unsuccessfully attempting to conceal the relationship from her), Zaza goes to her apartment and they have sex, in an explicit, naturalistic sequence.

Meanwhile, Zaza's parents find that they have left their house key in Zaza's car and spend the night at the home of their relatives Simon and Margalit. When Zaza doesn't answer repeated phone calls during the night, Yasha concludes that he is sleeping at a lover's house. Judith is unacceptable to Zaza's parents because she is divorced, has a child, and is older than Zaza. A number of Zaza's relatives stake out her apartment building, planning to confront the couple and frighten Judith into leaving Zaza.

The next time Zaza visits Judith, his relatives barge into her apartment and attempt to break up the relationship through polite argument, humiliation, and threats of violence, as Madona (whom Judith has finally introduced to Zaza) watches, frightened. Simon takes down a decorative sword from Judith's wall and holds it to her throat. Zaza and Judith say little, and eventually Zaza unconvincingly tells Judith their relationship is over and leaves with his family. He returns shortly and attempts to resume the evening where it was interrupted, but Judith quietly tells him that she doesn't want to see him again. Back at his apartment, Zaza has a further confrontation with his parents.

Some time later Zaza's parents return to Judith's apartment building. When Judith comes home, Lili approaches her and gives Madona a teddy bear as a peace offering, while Yasha stays in the car. In the apartment, Lili asks Judith if she has seen Zaza. Judith initially says she hasn't, but soon tearfully admits that Zaza has been calling her and begging her to marry him. Judith has refused because Zaza's reaction when his family invaded her apartment made her realize that "he loves you more than me," and she has decided the relationship is bad for all concerned. Back in the car, Yasha asks Lili if she will accept Judith as Zaza's wife. Lili, now more sympathetic toward Judith, tells him that they should wait and see if Zaza gets over her.

The next scene opens with Zaza and Yasha standing next to each other at urinals in a public restroom. It becomes clear that they are at Zaza's wedding reception, and Zaza is drunk. Zaza returns to the reception hall and gives a long, awkward, repetitive speech, while his wife, Lea, stands uncomfortably by his side. Eventually he tells the guests that he "has a woman on the side more beautiful than my wife" and drags Simon onstage to ask him to confirm this. Simon brings Zaza's mother onstage as Zaza's other woman, relieving the tension, and Zaza and Lili embrace. The film ends with Zaza and his bride dancing with the rest of his family.

== Cast ==
- Lior Ashkenazi as Zaza
- Ronit Elkabetz as Judith
- Moni Moshonov as Yasha
- Lili Kosashvili as Lili
- Aya Steinovitz as Ilana
- Rozina Cambos as Magouly
- Simon Chen as Simon
- Sapir Kugman as Madona
- Dina Doron as Luba
- Leonid Kanevsky as Otary
- Livia Chachmon Ayaliy as Margalit
- Eli Turi as Bessik
- Maria Ovanov as Lali

Lili Kosashvili, who plays Zaza's mother Lili, is the director's mother.

== Reception ==
The film was screened in the Un Certain Regard section at the 2001 Cannes Film Festival. After that screening, it premiered at the 18th Annual Israel Film Festival, where it was reviewed by John Petrakis of the Chicago Tribune, who wrote: "One of those welcome visitors, a movie that turns out to be much more than we expected".

Late Marriage was positively received by critics. Metacritic, which calculates a score from zero to 100 from a film's reviews, gave it a score of 82, translating to "Universal acclaim". Late Marriage placed 88th on Slant Magazine's best films of the 2000s. Ed Gonzalez, a Slant critic, wrote, "It so boldly confronts stringent cultural traditions it's a minor miracle it never becomes glib".

Late Marriage also got a positive response from critics on Rotten Tomatoes, where it holds a rank of 88% based on 64 reviews, with an average ranking of 7.3/10. The site's consensus is: "An observant black comedy about arranged marriages and tradition".

Danny Graydon of the BBC called Late Marriage "[a]n accomplished and tremendously engaging debut", while Emanuel Levy called the film "A highlight of Israeli cinema of the past decade". He also hailed Kosashvili's feature debut as "impressive" and "extremely powerful".

Edward Guthmann of the San Francisco Chronicle praised the lead roles portraying Ashkenazi and Elkabetz groups.

According to Roger Ebert of Chicago Sun-Times, Late Marriage "is not a one-level film, and one of its most revealing moments shows the strong-minded mother expressing respect for the equally iron-willed Judith".

== Awards ==
- Won the Ophir Award for Best Film in 2001.
- The film was Israel's submission for the 74th Academy Award for Best Foreign Film (it was not nominated).

== Stage adaption ==
The film has been adapted into a stage play of the same name. The play premiered in 2024 at the Habima Theatre in Tel Aviv, with Michael Aloni starring as Zaza.

== Bibliography ==
- "Film Review; Not Married? Sorry, You're Not a Man". The New York Times. 17 May 2002.
