= The Jews Are Coming =

- היהודים באים
- Genre: Sketch comedy Satire
- Created by: Assaf Beiser; Natalie Marcus; Yoav Gross
- Directed by: Kobi Havia
- Starring: Moni Moshonov; Yael Sharoni; Yaniv Biton; Ido Mosseri; Yossi Marshek; Maayan Blum; Shira Naor
- Country of origin: Israel
- Original language: Hebrew
- No. of seasons: 6
- No. of episodes: 72

Production
- Executive producers: Yoav Gross; Amit Zelts
- Producer: Ran Golan
- Editors: Nir Nachum; Chami Solomon; Ron Omer
- Running time: 24 minutes
- Production company: Yoav Gross Productions

Original release
- Network: Channel 1 (Seasons 1–2); Kan 11 (Season 3–6)
- Release: 7 November 2014 – August 24, 2024

The Jews Are Coming (Hebrew: היהודים באים, Hayehudim Ba'im) was an Israeli satirical television series. Each episode consists of several sketches on subjects ranging from Biblical stories, to Jewish Diaspora and Zionist history and Israeli current affairs, with occasional pop culture references such as a sketch featuring a religion centered on "The Dude". The ensemble cast includes such well-known actors as Moni Moshonov, Ido Mosseri and was directed by long time comedy director Kobi Havia (Domino, Echad Ha'am 1).

The show's opening sequence featured two male hands preparing a set of traditional circumcision implements.

== Overview by Season ==
Season 1

The series was initially planned for broadcast in 2013 on Channel 10, but production was canceled due to financial difficulties. The First Channel showed interest in the series' content and took over its production. Following a public uproar during production when a controversial segment was leaked on social media, Amir Gilat, the chairman of the Broadcasting Authority, decided to halt its airing. The creators believe that a significant portion of the sketches would have been censored on commercial television for rating concerns, such as sketches about David Ben-Gurion or Franz Kafka. The first season was presented in 2013-2014 before a live audience at the "Ozen Bar" club in Tel Aviv prior to its broadcast.

The first two seasons of the series aired on Kan 11 and were released on the YouTube channel of the Broadcasting Authority. The first season premiered on November 7, 2014. Broadcast on the First Channel was scheduled for Friday evenings, with each episode airing again during prime viewing time on a weekday about two weeks later to accommodate religious viewers. By the end of the first season, the sketches garnered 1.25 million views online, including YouTube and Facebook.

On February 13, 2015, the show won the Israeli Academy of Television award in the category of Entertainment, beating out competitors like "Eretz Nehederet".

Season 2

Due to the show's success, the Broadcasting Authority decided to produce a second season consisting of 15 episodes. The second season began airing on February 19, 2016, with new writers joining the existing team, including Yaron Niski.

Season 3

On February 6, 2017, it was announced that the Kan corporation had purchased the rights to air the third season of "The Jews Are Coming." New writer Tom Aharon joined the team. On May 2, 2017, Kan released a special episode on YouTube between the second and third seasons in honor of Independence Day. The episode, titled "The 70th Independence Day of the Hasmonean State," was part of the launch of Kan 11 broadcasts by the Israeli Broadcasting Corporation.

The third season premiered on October 15, 2017, on Kan 11, the Kan YouTube channel, and the corporation's website. This season saw Shira Naor join the main cast.

The third season included several sketches with political and social commentary, such as the sketch "Blood War," which dealt with the discarding of blood donations from Ethiopian immigrants, as well as sketches about "Parpar Nechmad," Ariel Sharon, and "The Farm Forum," and a sketch featuring Fistuk (from "Rega im Dodley" and "At Fistuk's House") returning from fighting in the First Lebanon War.

Season 4

Filming for the fourth season began on October 31, 2019, and it premiered on June 4, 2020. This season included a special episode titled "The House of Bathsheba," presenting a different perspective on the inheritance story of David to Solomon and Adonijah. The season opened with exceptionally high ratings and received very positive reviews, with some noting that "everything is precise, down to the comma," calling it "the best satire on screen" and stating it is "on its way to becoming a landmark in Israeli satire."

Season 5

The fifth season premiered on February 26, 2022. This season featured a special episode titled "Division," which compared current events to the division of the united Kingdom of Israel following King Solomon's era.

Season 6

The sixth and final season premiered on May 14, 2024. Filming for this season started in September 2023 but was interrupted by the outbreak of the 2023 Gaza War. As a result of the war, several segments were added to the series that dealt directly and indirectly with the conflict and its causes.

In April 2023, some of the sketches expected to appear in the season were revealed, including sketches on topics such as "Inyan Shel Zman", Vilna Gaon, the 1982 World Cup, "The Burnt," Assassination of Arlosoroff, Baruch Spinoza, Cities of Refuge, the Miracle of the cruse of Oil, the discovery of the Torah scroll during the reign of Josiah, and many other sketches.

== Reception ==
Season 4 opened with sketches featuring Israeli Prime Ministers Benjamin Netanyahu and Levi Eshkol; Biblical figures Moses and Joseph; Barbie designer Ruth Handler and her family; a trio of unemployed temple priests; and the late Israeli Border Police officer Medhat Youssef, who perished at the height of the Second Intifada. Ariana Melamed of Haaretz wrote that the episode "gives enough explosive material to believers of all sects, loathers of the public broadcasting corporation, and just plain people with fixations... It's an excellent, problematic and limited show, [that] heeds no one."

Nadav Menuchin of Walla! wrote of the final sketch that "[it] was not funny - it was painful, and sometimes that's just what satire is supposed to do - and a smart satire like The Jews Are Coming knows that when needed - you can switch a punch line for a punch in the gut." He adds that the show "succeeds tremendously, since through treatment of materials from the past it manages to be much more acute and relevant in its approach to the Israeli state of mind, than shows that react to current affairs."

Ariel Schnabel of the conservative Makor Rishon notes that the episode received 2.5 million views on digital platforms, "proof that [the show] is influential beyond its time slot." He writes that "the religious-right-wing-liberal is faced with an uneasy dilemma regarding [the show]. On the one hand, it's everything we were taught to despise... on the other - it's just an excellent show... a long conservative nightmare that you can't take your eyes off of, as they're filled with tears of laughter and outrage simultaneously."

=== Criticism ===
The program has elicited criticism from some in Israel who accuse the show of contempt for Jewish tradition and practice. Knesset Member Betzalel Smotrich wrote that the show has "no place in the world," and called to end government funding of the Israel Broadcasting Corporation, which airs the program. Members of the Knesset, including Smotrich, also wrote to Israel's attorney general calling for the show's removal, with MK Moshe Arbel accusing it of causing "severe damage to the religious feelings of many" within Israeli society.

== Some impersonated characters ==
- Woody Allen
- Yasser Arafat
- Aviv Geffen
- Adolf Hitler
- Ariel Sharon
- Haim Arlosoroff
- Chaim Topol
- Cyndi Lauper
- David Levy
- Goldie Hawn
- Benjamin Netanyahu
- Boaz Sharabi
- Chaim Weizmann
- Meir Sheetrit
- Jerry Siegel
- Steven Spielberg
