= Footnote (film) =

2011 Israeli film

- International festival poster
- הערת שוליים
- Directed by: Joseph Cedar
- Written by: Joseph Cedar
- Produced by: David Mandil; Moshe Edery; Leon Edery
- Starring: Shlomo Bar Aba; Lior Ashkenazi
- Cinematography: Yaron Scharf
- Edited by: Einat Glaser Zarhin
- Music by: Amit Poznansky
- Production companies: United King Films; Movie Plus
- Distributed by: United King Films
- Release dates: 14 May 2011 (Cannes); 2 June 2011 (Israel)
- Running time: 107 minutes
- Country: Israel
- Language: Hebrew
- Box office: $2 million

Footnote (Hebrew: הערת שוליים, translit. He'arat Shulayim) is a 2011 Israeli drama film written and directed by Joseph Cedar, starring Shlomo Bar Aba and Lior Ashkenazi. The plot revolves around the troubled relationship between a father and son who teach at the Talmud department of the Hebrew University of Jerusalem.

The film won the Best Screenplay Award at the 2011 Cannes Film Festival. Footnote won nine prizes at the 2011 Ophir Awards, becoming Israel's entry for the 84th Academy Awards for Best Foreign Language Film. On 18 January 2012, the film was named as one of the nine shortlisted entries for the Oscars. On 24 January 2012, the film was nominated for an Academy Award in the category of Best Foreign Language Film, but lost to the Iranian film A Separation.

== Plot ==
Eliezer Shkolnik (Shlomo Bar Aba) is a philologist who researches the textual tradition of the Jerusalem Talmud. He and his son Uriel (Lior Ashkenazi) are both professors at the Talmudic Research department of the Hebrew University of Jerusalem. Uriel, a charismatic academic, is extremely popular with the department's students and the general public, and is also recognized by the establishment when he is elected a member of the Israel Academy of Sciences and Humanities.

The father, on the other hand, is a stubborn old-school purist in his research methods. He is unpopular, unrecognized, and frustrated by his would-be lifetime research achievement having gone unfulfilled, as a rival scholar, Prof. Yehuda Grossman (Micah Lewensohn), published similar results one month ahead of Eliezer. Eliezer is also highly critical of the new methods of research used by his son and other modern researchers, as he considers them superficial. His ambition is to be recognized by being awarded the Israel Prize, but he is disappointed every year when he does not win it. His nature and the lack of recognition have made him bitter, anti-social, and envious of his son's popularity.

As he walks to his office one morning, Eliezer receives a phone call from the office of the Minister of Education, and is told that he has been elected that year's laureate of the Israel Prize.

The following day, Uriel is summoned to an urgent meeting with the Israel Prize committee. Uriel is told that an error had occurred and that in fact it was he, not his father, who was awarded the Israel Prize. The committee wishes to discuss ways to correct the error, but Uriel objects, saying the revelation would devastate his father. Uriel and the head of the committee, Grossman, argue over the issue until Uriel loses his temper and shoves Grossman. Regretting his outburst, Uriel relents and asks that the committee permit him to break the news to his father personally.

During the meeting, Uriel says he has been submitting his father's name for the Israel Prize every year, and accuses Grossman of blocking that and other ways of recognizing Eliezer. According to Grossman, Eliezer never published anything significant in his career, and his only claim to fame is being mentioned as a footnote in the work of a more famous scholar.

Uriel goes to the National Library to break the news to his father but finds him raising a toast to winning the prize with colleagues. Unable to break the news, he once again meets with Grossman, asking that the prize be given to Eliezer. Grossman relents but with two conditions: Uriel must write the committee's recommendation, and Uriel can never be a candidate for the prize. Uriel is evidently shocked by the second condition, but ultimately agrees.

Uriel writes the recommendation text, picking and choosing every word carefully; at the same time, Eliezer, finally recognized, is interviewed by the newspaper Haaretz, during which he impugns the scientific and academic validity of Uriel's research. When the interview is published, Uriel is angry but keeps his secret. Later, though, he whispers the secret to his mother. She does not disclose the truth to anyone else.

During preparations for a television interview, Eliezer is struck by an uncommon Talmudic expression in the Israel Prize committee's recommendation. He flees the television studio and returns to his study. He examines the expression, cross-checking its published uses, and realizes that the text must have actually been written by Uriel. Eliezer also reconstructs his phone conversation with the Minister of Education, realizing she had addressed him by his last name only. He concludes that the minister thought she was talking to his son when she broke the news about the Israel Prize.

On the day of the prize ceremony, Eliezer and his wife arrive at the Jerusalem International Convention Center to prepare for the ceremony; Eliezer is stressed and distracted. The movie ends a moment before the laureates are called to the stage.

== Cast ==
- Shlomo Bar-Aba as Eliezer Shkolnik
- Lior Ashkenazi as Uriel Shkolnik
- Alisa Rosen as Yehudit Shkolnik, Eliezer's wife and Uriel's mother
- Alma Zack as Dikla Shkolnik, Uriel's wife
- Daniel Markovich as Josh Shkolnik, Uriel's son
- Micah Lewensohn as Yehuda Grossman
- Yuval Scharf as Noa the reporter
- Nevo Kimchi as Yair Fingerhut
- Yona Elian as Yuli Tamir, Minister of Education (voice)

== Production ==
Director Joseph Cedar explained why he chose to make a film that focuses on Hebrew University's Talmud department: "It is the smallest department in the university, but it is famous worldwide for its uncompromising methods, and its unforgiving attitude toward the notion of 'mistake'. Once I started hearing stories from within this department, about mythological rivalries between scholars, stubbornness on an epic scale, eccentric professors who live with an academic mission that is bigger than life itself, even if its topic is radically esoteric, I fell in love with them all, and they became the centre of this story." The film was produced by United King Films and Movie Plus. It received support from the Israel Film Fund, Jerusalem Film Fund and the AVI CHAI Foundation.

The film marked the return to cinema after 20 years for Shlomo Bar Aba, a stage comedian, in the role of the father. Bar Aba prepared his character for six months. Lior Ashkenazi, who was raised in a secular home, took Talmud classes at the Hebrew University and let his beard grow for eight months.

== Release ==
Footnote premiered in competition at the 2011 Cannes Film Festival on 14 May, winning the Best Screenplay Award. It was released in Israel on 2 June through United King Films. North American distribution rights for the film were acquired by Sony Pictures Classics.

== Box office ==
As of 8 July 2012, the film has grossed $2,007,451, in North America.

== Critical reception ==
The film received high critical acclaim. At Rotten Tomatoes, the film holds a rating of 90%, based on 89 reviews and an average rating of 7.63/10. It also has a score of 83 on Metacritic, based on 27 reviews, indicating "universal acclaim".

Hannah Brown of The Jerusalem Post called the film "brilliant and audacious", and wrote: "Cedar uses dramatic cinematography, music and visual effects to signal that this is a film about an earth-shaking battle, at least in its protagonists’ hearts and minds. The acting is outstanding, notably by Bar-Abba and Ashkenazi." Cedar received the Cannes Film Festival's Best Screenplay Award. A. O. Scott, film critic for The New York Times, called Footnote the fourth best film of 2012. Wrote Scott:

This Israeli film takes what might have been a trivial anecdote — a committee accidentally awards a prize to the wrong scholar — and turns it into a tragicomic opera with a great deal to say about Zionism, academia, family life and the way language functions as a bridge between the sacred and the profane.

== Remake ==
Footnote was adapted into the 2022 French film Maestro(s), with philology and the Israel Prize in the narrative replaced by conducting and the head position at La Scala, respectively.

== See also ==
- Culture of Israel
- Cinema of Israel
- List of submissions to the 84th Academy Awards for Best Foreign Language Film
- List of Israeli submissions for the Academy Award for Best Foreign Language Film
