= Taxi Driver (Israeli TV series) =

- טקסי דרייבר
- Genre: Comedy drama
- Written by: Yuval Segal
- Directed by: Season 1- Eitan Anner; Season 2- Eitan Zur
- Country of origin: Israel
- Original language: Hebrew
- No. of seasons: 2
- No. of episodes: 26

Production
- Executive producers: Eilon Ratzkovsky, Yossi Uzrad, Guy Jacoel, Noa Lifshitz
- Running time: 30 minutes

Original release
- Network: Yes Comedy
- Release: March 2010 – 2012

Taxi Driver (Hebrew: טקסי דרייבר - pronounced: Teksi Drayver) is an Israeli comedy-drama television series that began broadcasting on Yes Comedy in March 2010, and aired a second season in 2012.

== Plot ==
Taxi Driver focuses on a group of childhood friends who are now in their late 30s, who work and manage The Neighborhood Taxi station. The show takes place in the small, unknown, town where the friends all grew up. The series shows their lives, and focuses on how strong their friendship remains.

=== Season 2 ===
Most of the friends have children now and season two focuses on them attempting to keep their friendship while also focusing on their families, in addition to the station struggling to survive. Yigal & Fanny prepare to leave and move to a nearby village, after have a girl, six months before the season started, in addition to Fanny's two brothers returning from Russia with mail order brides. Shit had a son at the same time as Yigal's daughter was born. Herzel is expecting a kid with his ex-wife Anat. Aviahu, gave up on his gambling, but attempts to commit suicide after realizing he will never be an actor, and can't stop thinking about his ex-wife. Elisha is searching for himself. Harra wants to move in with Haggit who had his son Kayes, however she lives with her new husband Fuad.

== Characters ==
The five main characters of the show are:

- Yoram Toledano - Aviahu, is a gambler
- Dvir Benedek - Elisha, is an amateur actor
- Yuval Segal - Yigal, is an eternal bachelor
- Danny Shteg - Herzl, is a jealous about his wife and refuses to have children
- Kobi Marciano - Shit, owner of The Neighborhood Taxi, which is failing

== Seasons ==
=== Season 1 ===
Season 1 premiered 9 March 2010 and consisted of 13 episodes.

=== Season 2 ===
Season 2 premiered 8 August 2012 and consisted of 13 episodes.

Season two takes place approximately one year after season 1 left off.

== Syndication ==
Taxi Driver picked up Israeli syndication on Channel 2

Taxi Driver can be seen in the United States on the Israeli Network.
