= Sefi Rivlin =

Israeli actor and comedian (1947–2013)

- ספי ריבלין
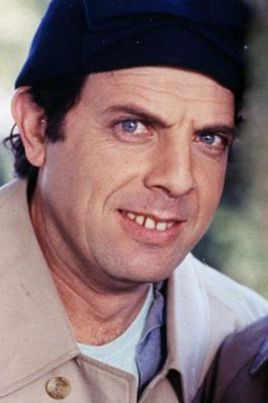
- Born: Yosef Rivlin; 7 November 1947; Nahalat Yehuda, Mandatory Palestine
- Died: 3 December 2013 (aged 66); Ramat Gan, Israel
- Occupations: Actor; comedian
- Years active: 1973–2013
- Spouse: Rina Rivlin
- Children: 4

Yosef "Sefi" Rivlin (Hebrew: ספי ריבלין; 7 November 1947 – 3 December 2013) was an Israeli actor and comedian.

He was best known for his roles in the satire show Nikui Rosh ("Head Cleaning"), the children’s program Rega im Dodley and its spin-off At Fistuk's Home.

== Personal life and death ==
Yosef "Sefi" Rivlin was born and grew up in Nahalat Yehuda (present-day Rishon LeZion). He was born to the Rivlin family. He studied acting at the Beit Zvi School for the Performing Arts. He was married to Rina, with whom he had four children.

Rivlin was diagnosed with laryngeal cancer in 2007. In 2010, he announced that he was cured, but in 2012, he underwent further treatment that left him unable to speak. He died in Sheba Medical Center in Ramat Gan at the age of 66 although rumors of his death began to circulate earlier, after the death of Israeli singer Arik Einstein. A memorial ceremony held at Habimah Theater in Tel Aviv on the morning of the funeral was attended by a large crowd of Israeli entertainers and politicians. Rivlin was buried in the old cemetery of Rishon LeZion.

== Acting career ==
Rivlin's acting debut was in 1973, when he appeared at the Khan Theater in Jerusalem in Servant of Two Masters, directed by the British-born director Mike Alfreds. He played the part of the Archie Bunker character on Itche - the Israeli version of All in the Family - and starred in the series Sefi, an Israeli version of Britain's Mr. Bean. He acted in musicals and often emceed children's festivals. Rivlin appeared on the long-running comedy show Zehu Ze!. In the 1980s and 1990s, he appeared in a number of films, including director Avi Nesher's HaSodot.

== Sports career ==
Sefi Rivlin
Personal information
- Full name: Yosef (Sefi) Rivlin

Youth career
- Hapoel Rishon LeZion F.C.

Senior career*
Years	Team	Apps	(Gls)
1962–1969	Hapoel Rishon LeZion F.C.		
- * Club domestic league appearances and goals

He enrolled in the youth football club of Hapoel Rishon LeZion F.C. and later on played in the senior side from 1962 until 1969.

== Political activism ==
A supporter of the Likud party, he appeared in advertisements for the party in the 1984 national elections. He briefly served on the Rishon LeZion City Council. In 2008, he ran in the primaries to determine the Likud list for the Eighteenth Knesset, but was placed in an unrealistic place on the list.

== Awards and recognition ==
Rivlin won the Israeli Television Academy award. In 2002, he won the Golden Mask prize for lifetime achievement.

A Jerusalem Post columnist who interviewed him said: "Watching him is very simply an audience with a comic artist - hour after hour, he creates comedy. In person, he is much funnier than he is on TV. Face to face, his bug eyes and mugging and comic airs, and, above all, his nonstop improvisatory ability, are explosively funny."

Upon the news of Rivlin's death, Prime Minister Benjamin Netanyahu called Rivlin a “friend and companion” and a "beloved artist who made generations of Israelis laugh with his witty humor.”

== Personal life ==
Rivlin lived in Nahalat Yehuda, a workers' moshav that became a neighborhood in Rishon LeZion in 1988. His wife was Rina (née Nathan) and they have three daughters and a son. After Rivlin's death, Adi Zino, the daughter of actress Effi Ben Israel, claimed that Rivlin was her biological father.

== See also ==
- Television in Israel
- Culture of Israel
