= Becky Griffin =

Israeli-American television host and model

Becky Griffin בקי גריפין
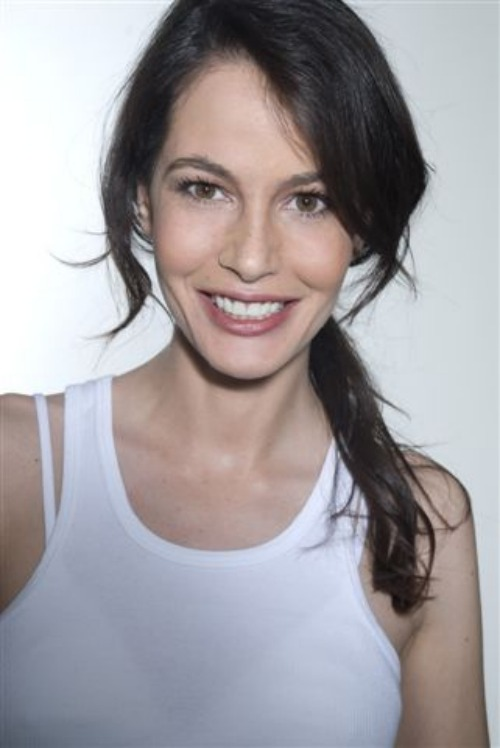
- Griffin in 2009
- Born: Rebecca Griffin; December 27, 1977 (age 48); Givatayim, Israel
- Education: Tel Aviv University
- Parent: Bob Griffin (father)
- Modeling information
- Height: 5 ft 5 in (1.65 m)
- Hair color: brown
- Eye color: hazel

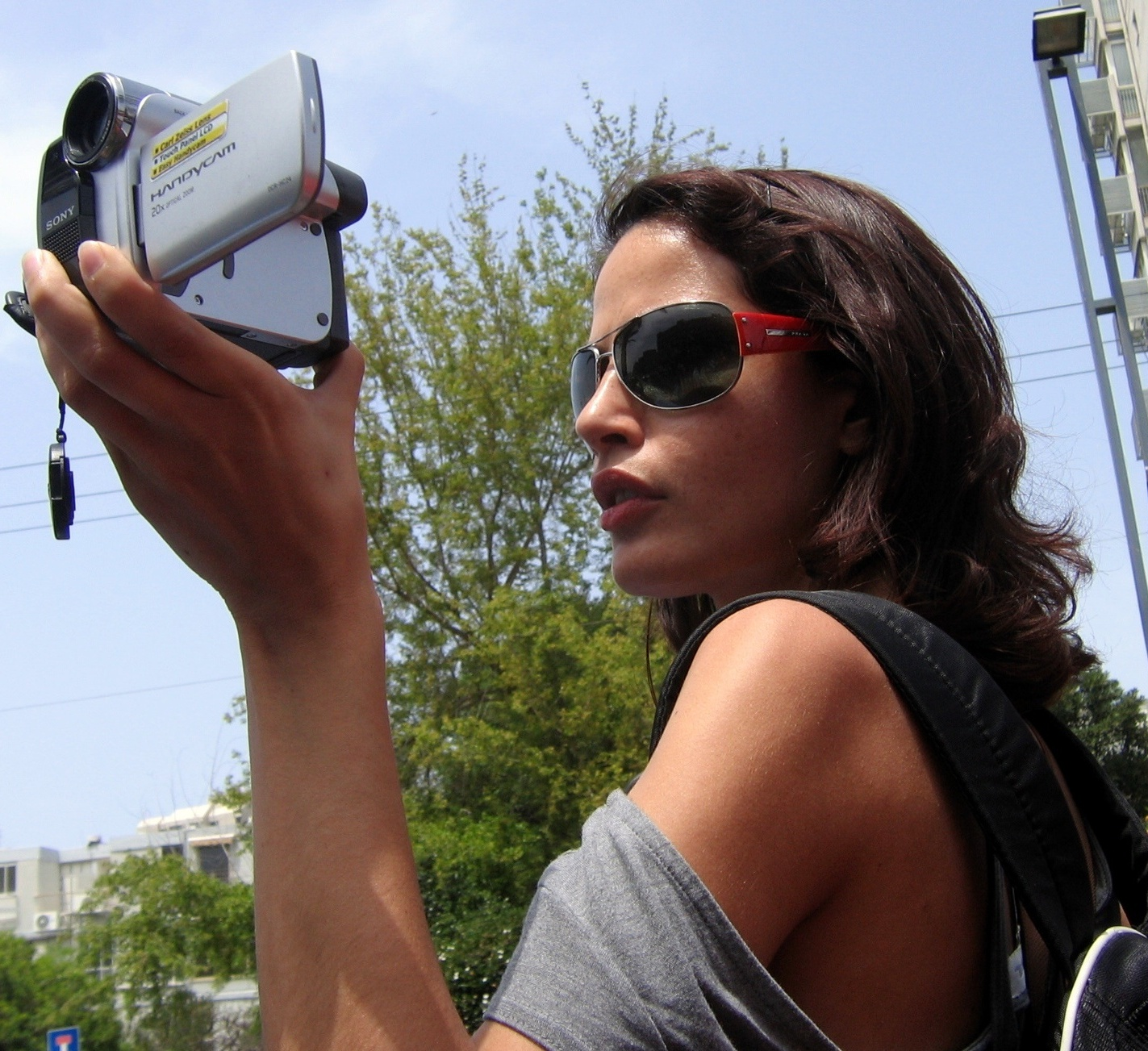
Griffin in 2007

Rebecca "Becky" Griffin (Hebrew: רבקה "בקי" גריפין; born 27 December 1977) is an Israeli-American television host, model, actress, and sports journalist.

== Biography ==
Rebecca Griffin was born in Givatayim, Israel. Her mother Ariela (née Gadasi) of Yemenite-Jewish descent, was an accountant for the Steimatzky bookstore chain. Her father Bob Griffin is an American-born Israeli of Jewish and Irish descent, who played professional basketball for Israeli Basketball Premier League clubs in the 1970s such as Maccabi Tel Aviv, and is currently an associate professor of English Literature. Her parents first met at a bus stop in Israel. She has a younger brother named Oren Griffin.

She appeared in a commercial at the age of 11 and went on to star in several commercials and campaigns. She worked as a sports reporter on the Israeli Sport 5 Channel, hosted youth shows on Israel's Channel 1, and did reporting for Erev Tov Im Guy Pines and In & Out. Griffin also starred in the 2003 Israeli drama film Matana MiShamayim.

== Media and modelling career ==
On May 12, 2003, she became an MTV VJ on MTV Europe, and left the Israeli sports channel. Prior to 2005, Griffin stayed in the United Kingdom and appeared on the channel as the host of the Dance Floor Chart, the World Chart Express, and many Pan-Euro specials.

During her time in the UK, Griffin was chosen to star in the Nissan Micra campaign all over Europe.

In December 2003, she was chosen to lead the campaign of the Israeli fashion chain Castro.

She returned to Israel in 2005, and a year later enrolled as a cinema and television student at the Tel Aviv University (TAU). She was a media consultant for The Student Union during the 2006–2007 student protests.

In 2008, Griffin was the EuroLeague correspondent for Israel's Channel 10, and in 2010 hosted "Inside Israeli Basketball", a magazine that aired on several American cable stations.

In August 2011, Griffin brought international attention to the Nivea Cosmetics website for failing to list Israel as a country, while including the Palestinian territories. Griffin wrote a letter to Nivea which she publicized on her Facebook page, beginning a boycott of Nivea products. Conservative radio and television personality Glenn Beck raised the issue on his radio show on the morning of August 4, 2011, and minutes later Nivea's site included Israel. That day, Nivea told BLAZE Magazine that the website for Israel was under construction and had therefore not been listed.

== See also ==
- Women in Israel
- List of Israelis
