= Dov Glickman =

Israeli actor (born 1949)

- דב גליקמן
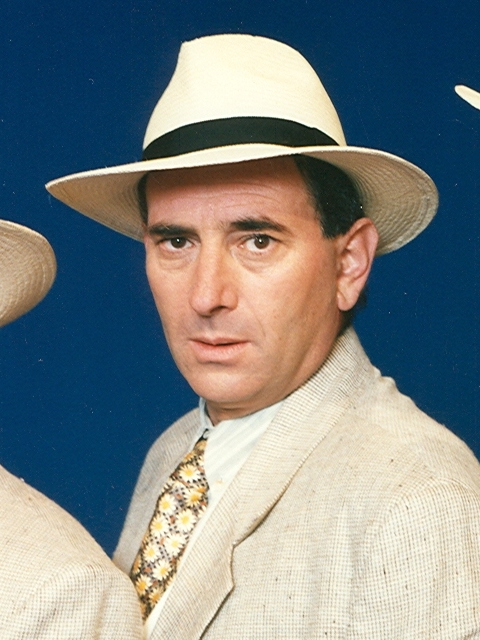
- Glickman in 2009
- Born: 22 December 1949 (age 76); Tel Aviv, Israel
- Other name: Dovaleh Glickman
- Occupation: Actor
- Years active: 1977–present

Dov Glickman (Hebrew: דב גליקמן; born 22 December 1949) is an Israeli film, television and theatre actor.

== Biography ==
Dov Glickman was born in Tel Aviv, Israel, to a secular Jewish family. His Russian Jewish parents Shlomo and Dvora immigrated to the Land of Israel in the 1920s. He began his career at the Israel Defense Forces's Naval Entertainment troupe. During the early 1970s, he was a member of the Haifa Theatre company, where he played a variety of roles.

== Acting career ==
In 1977, he made his first film appearance in Judd Ne'eman's Paratroopers. For a period of twenty years between 1978–1998, Glickman starred, alongside Moni Moshonov, Shlomo Bar-Aba and Gidi Gov in Israel's longest running television show, the weekly satirical show Zehu Ze!. In 1995, he starred in Ephraim Kishon's TV comedy Sipurey Efraim. In 2013, he played in the internationally acclaimed film Big Bad Wolves, for which he won the Best Actor award at the Fantasporto festival. During the years, he appeared in numerous notable theatre productions, as well as films.

In 2013, he was cast in a lead role of TV drama Shtisel, as the somber, wry, and charismatic Rabbi Shulem Shtisel, for which he won The Israeli Academy Award for Best Actor in a leading role, twice.

During the 1990s, he revived his Zehu-Ze character, Shaul, the flower salesmen in a Yellow Pages ad campaign, where he coined the term "wa-wa-wi-wa" later used by Sacha Baron Cohen. The campaign went on to become a TV series in 2002, written and created by Glickman.

In 2016, he played the minister of commerce in Josef Cedar's Norman. In 2018 he played a holocaust survivor in the Austrian film:"Murer: Anatomie eines Prozesses", in the critically acclaimed miniseries Stockholm, in Yankul Goldwasser's film "Laces" for which he won the Israeli Academy Award for best actor in a supporting role, and in Yonathan Indurski's and Ori Alon series "The Conductor" opposite Lior Ashkenazi. Since 2016, he had been starring in the theatrical political comedy "Angina Pectoris", written by Michal Aharoni, in the leading role.

In 2018/2019, he played Etgar in Burkhard C. Kosminski's highly acclaimed production of "Vögel" by Wajdi Mouawad at Schauspielhaus Stuttgart.

== See also ==
- Israeli television
- Israeli cinema
- Theater of Israel
