= Shlomo Bar-Aba =

Israeli comedian, actor, dubber and TV host (born 1950)

- שלמה בראבא
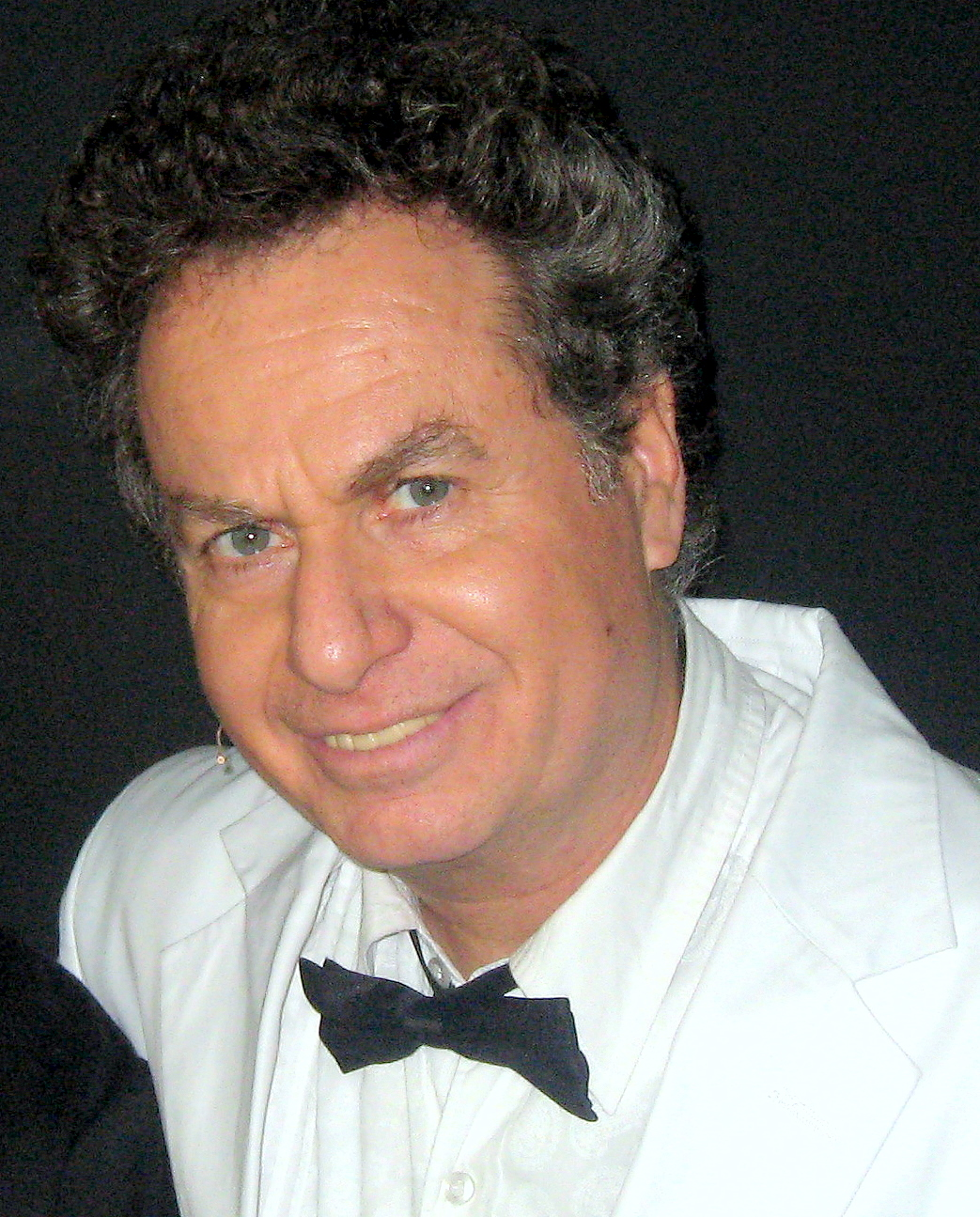
- Born: July 11, 1950 (age 76); Hedera
- Occupations: Comedian, actor, dubber, TV host

Shlomo Bar-Aba (Hebrew: שלמה בראבא; born July 11, 1950) is an Israeli comedian, actor, dubber and TV host. Since 1978 he has been acting in the long-running Israeli entertainment television program Zehu Ze! (That's It!). He also regularly appeared performed in Israeli theatre, television, and film. He won an Ophir Award for his role in the film Footnote and two Television Academy Awards for his respective roles in the series Uri and Ella and Six Zeros.

== Biography ==
Bar-Aba was born in Hadera and raised in Netanya to Holocaust-survivor parents as the eldest son with two younger sisters. He was named after his paternal grandfather, who was the Chief Rabbi of the city of Lodz. In his youth, he studied drama at the Renanim School of the Arts in Tel Aviv. After the school's attempted closure in 1967 and its relocation from its permanent building, he completed the twelfth grade at Thelma Yellin High School.

Bar-Aba began his military service as a trainee in the IDF air force pilot program. After dropping out he transferred to the Central Command Band and participated in its program "Red Alinio La'Bik'a" in 1969, in which he sang a solo on the song "Hamrlava". That same year, the band was chosen as the band of the year on Galei Tzahal. In 1970, he participated in another program of the Central Command Band – "By the Jordan River" ("Leyad Hayarden").

== Career ==
Upon his release from the IDF, Bar Abba appeared in the play "The Corkscrew" alongside Uri Zohar and studied for a bachelor's degree in the theater department at Tel Aviv University. In the 1970s, he joined Nola Chelton's project in Kiryat Shmona. In 1972, he began performing in entertainment shows with Moni Moshonov, who had been his partner for many years, and appeared in Haifa Theater plays such as the social play "Crisis".

In 1975, he played with Moshonov in the episode "The Cashier" from the series "We also Judge".

In 1978, he began acting in the well-known television program "Zehu Zeh!" ("This Is It!") along with Moshonov, Gidi Gov and other actors, where he is best remembered for his character of "Yatsek", a kind of parody of a Zionist pioneer with a mustache, a Tembel hat, khaki pants and an accordion, who explained places in Israel from a humorous perspective. In 2011, Yatsek was voted 10th in the parade of the most beloved characters on educational television. Brava presented a crazy nonsense humor that inspired many entertainers after him. An example of his famous segment: he starts telling a joke about a Pole, a Kurd and a Swede traveling on a train, moves on to current affairs, and when he returns to the joke, the Kurd gets lost along the way.

Brava, together with Moshonov, staged several entertainment shows, including "Seeing Double," "Suddenly Together," "The Chicken and the Egg," and with other artists, "A One-Time Evening" and "A Conventional One-Time Evening."

In parallel with his entertainment career, Baraba appeared in theater plays: "And There Was a Hole", "Romeo and Juliet", "Crisis", "Twentieth Night", "Crumb", "The Cherry Orchard", "Oliver Twist", the Israeli musical (commercially produced by Menachem Golan), "The Campers", and "The Zalmanites" at the Haifa Theater, "The Good Soldier Svejk" and "The Comedians" at the Habima Theater, and "The Witch", the musical "The Producers", the musical "Something Funny Happened" and in the play "The Written" at the Cameri Theater.

In cinema, he participated in the films: "Stretcher Journey" (1977), "The Man Who Came to Take" (1981), "The Scroll 83" (1983), "Fictitious Marriage" (1988), "Cables" (1992), "Footnote" (2011), "Leap Up" (2014)[2], "Love in the Lakes" (2019) and "Aspiration for Life" (2020).

During the 1980s, he participated in the dubbing of the character of "Bentz" (Bert from the duo Bert and Ernie on the children's television show Sesame Street), and in 2004 he voiced the character of Sykes in the film "Shark Tale".

As part of the duo "Moni and Bar-Aba", he participated in five Festigal shows. The songs the duo performed were "Friends" (1983), "Tired but Satisfied" (1984), "The Song of Yumbo and Gamba" (1987), "Me and My Shadow" (1988) and "Sandwich Boy" (1990). In 1991, he participated, alongside Moni Moshnov, Gidi Gov, the Yosef sisters and the Hopa Hey trio, in a Passover show called "This is Hopa".

In 1992, he created and starred in the three-part mockumentary "Y. Schwartz and His Struggle in Life" on Channel 1, which over the years has gained the status of a cult series.

In the early days of Channel 2, he played the character of "Bruno" in a regular corner of the Telad franchise, where he presented the broadcast schedule with his characteristic wild humor. In 1998, a second season of "Bruno" was broadcast, this time dedicated to the 50th anniversary of the state.

Hosted the first two seasons of the entertainment program Shel Mi HaSura HaZot? ("Whose Line Is This?")

For many years he was a central actor in the troupes of the "Habima" Theater and the Cameri Theater and was considered one of the most prominent dramatic and comedic actors in Israel.

In 2007, he hosted the game show "Identification Line" on Channel 10.

In 2008, he participated in the production of The Festigal, playing the role of the evil mayor. This was Baraba's return to producing The Festigal, after an 18-year absence.

In 2009, he participated in the third season of the television series, "Parashat HaShavua", which aired on HOT.

In 2010, he participated in the comedy film "Half a Ton of Bronze", which was shown on HOT VOD.

In 2011, he played the Talmud scholar Professor Eliezer Shkolnik in Joseph Cedar's film, "Footnote", which won the Screenplay Award at the Cannes Film Festival. Bar-Aba won the "Ophir Award" for Best Leading Actor for his performance in the film. That same year, he participated as a judge in the entertainment program, "You Made Us Laugh", which aired on Channel 2 as part of the Keshet Media Group. That same year, he participated in a supporting role in the children's show Motek Shel Festival alongside Rinat Gabay and Yael Bar Zohar.

In 2012, Bar-Aba participated in the show Rokdim Im Kokhavim (Dancing with the Stars) on Channel 2 alongside dancer Polina Chiktonov. Later that year, Bar-Aba began participating in the comedy series "You Don't Choose Family" broadcast on Channel 2.

In 2013, he played Menachem Falkman, founder and manager of the "Neve Shmarit" estate in the horror series "The Plague".

In 2015, he first staged a solo show, based on episodes from his personal and professional life. He wrote the show with his partner, Shemer Gaon.

In 2016, the television series "Uri and Ella" was released, starring him as Uri and with the participation of Dina Sanderson, who also wrote the series.

In 2017, he played Rabbi Alter Cooper in the series "Shebabnikim".

In April 2018, he participated in the First season (male participants) of the docu-reality show "It's Never Too Late" which aired on Channel 13.

In December 2018, he participated in the drama series Tel Aviv DA Office ("Pamata") broadcast on Kan 11, in which he played the role of Judge Kahn.

In 2019, he participated in the film "Love in the Lakes".

In 2020, Bar-Aba appeared in the remake of the successful entertainment program "Zehu Zeh!", in the series "Stockholm" on Kan 11, in the series "Hanachala" on Keshet Channel 12, and in the film "Shaifa Chaim".

In 2022, Bar-Aba participated in a leading role in a campaign for the Mediterranean Towers assisted living network.

In 2023, he played Zvi in the series "Six Zeros" broadcast on Kan 11.

Baraba returned to the special season produced by Kan 11 of "This is it!" following the events of the Corona pandemic, and continues to appear on this program in 2024.

In 2024, he participated in the solo play, "Shabbat Boker", written by Michal Aharoni for the Theatronetto Festival, following the story of Shlomo Ron, 85, who was murdered in his home in Kibbutz Nahal Oz in the October 7 attacks.

== Selected filmography ==
- 1977 Paratroopers
- 1983: The Megillah 83, musical
- 1988: Fictitious Marriage (he received the 1988 Silver Menorah Award as the best actor in this film)
- 1992: Cables
- 2011: Footnote
- 2014: Hill Start

2019: Love in Suspenders (Ahava Bi'Shlei'kes), romantic comedy

== Awards ==
- 2023: Honorary Doctorate from the Bar-Ilan University to the participants of the program Zehu Ze!: Gidi Gov, Dov Glickman, Shlomo Baraba, Muni Moshunov and Avi Kushnir for their joint contribution to Israeli culture on the occasion of the 75th anniversary of the state of Israel
- 2022: Israeli Academy of Film and Television Awards: Lifetime Achievement Award to Zehu Ze!
- 2021:Lifetime Achievement Award from the Israeli Artists' Association (Shaham)
- Ophir Award for Best Lead Actor in the 2011 film Footnote.
- Awards of the Israeli Television Academy for his roles in TV series Uri and Ella sand Six Zeros.

== Personal life ==
Bar-Aba was married to Ingrid Ben Morris, but the two divorced after a few years. He then married Hamda Levy, and they had two sons. The couple divorced in 2012.

Since 2013, he has been in a relationship with Shemer Gaon, who is 25 years his junior, and the couple has a daughter who was born in 2015. The two were married in September 2017.

Lives in the Ramat Aviv neighborhood of Tel Aviv.
