= Seven Figures =

- Genre: Drama
- Created by: Noya Oren
- Written by: Noya Oren
- Directed by: Nir Bergman
- Starring: Shlomo Bar-Aba; Liora Rivlin; Ofer Hayoun; Shani Klein; Rotem Keinan; Elisha Banai; Roni Daloomi; Sharon Strimban; Rita Shukrun; Noam Imber
- Music by: Eldad Guetta
- Country of origin: Israel
- Original language: Hebrew
- No. of seasons: 1
- No. of episodes: 8

Production
- Executive producer: Kainan Eldar
- Producer: David Mandil
- Cinematography: Shai Goldman
- Running time: 35 minutes
- Production company: MoviePlus Productions

Original release
- Network: Kan 11

Seven Figures (Hebrew: שישה אפסים, Shisha Afasim, lit. "six zeros") is an Israeli comedy drama television series broadcast on Kan 11 that premiered on 13 June 2023. The series was created by Noya Oren and directed by Nir Bergman.

In May 2024, the show was awarded Best Comedy Drama at the Awards of the Israeli Television Academy.

== Plot ==
The series follows the lives of six Israeli lottery winners as they participate in a mandatory workshop to prepare for their new lives as millionaires in accordance with a newly passed law in Israel. The series depicts the struggles undergone by the characters as they work to meet the requirements and receive their money.

== Series overview ==
| Series | Episodes | Originally released | |
| Series | Episodes | First released | Last released |
|---|---|---|---|
| 1 | 8 | 13 June 2023 | 25 July 2023 |
