= Shira Naor =

Israeli actress (born 1993)

- שירה נאור
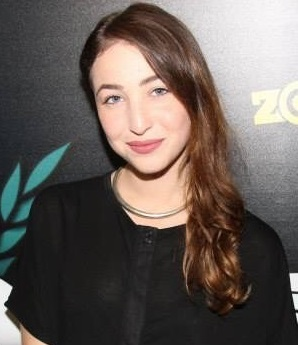
- Naor in 2016
- Born: August 28, 1993 (age 32); Los Angeles, California, U.S.
- Occupation: Actress
- Years active: 2002–present

Shira Naor (Hebrew: שירה נאור; born August 28, 1993) is an American-born Israeli actress.

She graduated from Tel Aviv Art High School.

She is best known for her Hebrew dubbing as Dora Márquez from Dora the Explorer.

== Filmography ==
=== Television ===
- Taagad (Hebrew: תאג׳׳ד) (Lia Karni)
- Greenhouse Academy (Season 2) (Young Ryan)
- The Jews are Coming

=== Dubbing ===
==== Animation and live-action TV ====
- Adventure Time (Fionna, Flame Princess)
- American Dragon: Jake Long (Haley Kay Long)
- Ben 10 (Gwen Tennyson (eps 40 Onwards))
  - Ben 10: Alien Force (Gwen Tennyson)
  - Ben 10: Ultimate Alien (Gwen Tennyson)
  - Ben 10: Omniverse (Gwen Tennyson, Additional Characters)
- Bolts & Blip (Lenoia)
- Brandy & Mr. Whiskers (Brandy)
- Care Bears: Adventures in Care-a-lot (Bedtime Bear)
- Cosmic Quantum Ray (Atee)
- Dora the Explorer (Dora Márquez)
  - Go, Diego, Go! (Dora Márquez)
  - Dora and Friends: Into the City! (Dora Márquez)
- Dragon Ball Z (Pan)
  - Dragon Ball GT (Pan)
- Edgar & Ellen (Additional Characters (Season 2))
- Grossology (Abby Archer/Abby Archer Skeleton)
- Jakers! The Adventures of Piggley Winks (Piggley Winks (Child))
- Little Clowns of Happytown (Additional Characters)
- Matt's Monsters (Additional Characters)
- MegaMan NT Warrior (Yai Ayanokoji)
- Mix Master (Pachi)
- Monster Allergy (Elena Potato)
- Once Upon a Time... The Discoverers (Psi)
- Paw Patrol (Rocky)
- Pet Alien (Melba Manners (Season 2))
- Ruby Gloom (Iris)
- Rugrats Pre-School Daze (Savannah)
- Sailor Moon (Ami Mizuno/Sailor Mercury (ep. 151 onwards))
- Strawberry Shortcake (Angel Cake)
  - Strawberry Shortcake's Berry Bitty Adventures (Angel Cake)
- Sidekick (Vana Glama/Vana Glama of the Costumes)
- Tai Chi Chasers (Sena)
- The Save-Ums! (Jazzi)
- Total Drama: Revenge of the Island (Dakota/Dakotazoid)
- Total Drama: All-Stars (Lindsay)
- Total Drama: Pahkitew Island (Sky)
- Total Drama Presents: The Ridonculous Race (Kitty, Emma)
- Turbo F.A.S.T. (Burn)
- YooHoo & Friends (Pookee's Daughter)
- Young Justice (Artemis Crock)
- YuYu Hakusho (Keiko Yukimura)
- ChalkZone (Rudy Tabootie)
- Kitty Is Not a Cat (Kitty)

==== Animated and live-action films/Direct-to-video films ====
- Arthur Christmas (Bryony)
- Ben 10: Secret of the Omnitrix (Gwen Tennyson)
  - Ben 10: Destroy All Aliens (Gwen Tennyson)
- Care Bears Film Series
  - The Care Bears' Big Wish Movie (Good Luck Bear, Bedtime Bear)
  - Care Bears: Share Bear Shines (Bedtime Bear)
  - Care Bears: The Giving Festival (Bedtime Bear)
- Cars 3 (Cruz Ramirez)
- Charlotte's Web (Nellie)
- Chicken Little (Additional Voices)
- Coraline (Additional Voices)
- Dora and the Lost City of Gold (Dora Marquez) (Trailer Only)
- Epic (Mary Katherine)
- Harry Potter and the Order of the Phoenix (Luna Lovegood (Evanna Lynch))
  - Harry Potter and the Half-Blood Prince (Luna Lovegood (Evanna Lynch))
- Horrid Henry: The Movie (Moody Margaret (Scarlett Stitt))
- Horton Hears a Who! (Jessica Quilligan, Hillary)
- Ice Age: The Meltdown (Additional Voices)
  - Ice Age: Dawn of the Dinosaurs (Dinosaur Baby)
  - Ice Age: Continental Drift (Katie)
- Madagascar (Additional Voices)
- Monster House (Jennifer "Jenny" Bennett)
- Nanny McPhee and the Big Bang (Megsie Green (Lil Woods))
- Nim's Island (Nim Rusoe (Abigail Breslin))
- Over the Hedge (Mackenzie)
- Secret of the Wings (Periwinkle)
- Strawberry Shortcake: The Sweet Dreams Movie (Ginger Snap)
- The Simpsons Movie (Lisa Simpson, Maggie Simpson)
- The Spiderwick Chronicles (Young Lucinda Spiderwick (Jordy Benattar))
- Turbo (Burn)
