= Shnaim Ohazin =

- Shaniam Ohazin logo.
- Also known as: Two people holding
- Directed by: Arie Ben Tsion
- Starring: Baruch Bar: Itsik Sayidoff, Ori Orian: Avi Oriah
- Country of origin: Israel
- Original language: Hebrew
- No. of seasons: 1
- No. of episodes: 13

Production
- Running time: 24 minutes per episode

Original release
- Network: Israeli Educational Television
- Release: 1984 – 1985

Shnaim Ohazin (Hebrew: שניים אוחזין, lit. Two people holding), is a television show broadcast on the Israeli Educational Television during the 1980s that dealt with teaching basic concepts of the Talmud and Jewish heritage. The concept of the show was Mr. Bar and Mr. Orian meet to study Gemara (Talmud) together. The show was incorporated in the past as part of the 7th-grade curriculum in secondary yeshivas, or 9th-grade curriculum in secular Hebrew-speaking schools, and a study booklet was added in 1989, written and edited by Benjamin Domovitz.

== Structure ==
The show had two hosts, Baruch Bar (The tall one — Itsik Sayidoff) and Ori Orian (The chubby one — Avi Oriah), who used a study room that has been converted to a television studio where they learn different topics in the Talmud while focusing on explaining basic concepts. The hosts are aware of the cameras and audience. After explaining the topic from the writings the two argue among themselves over the explanation of the subject. Then in a fictionalized segment they go back in time to the period of the Mishnah (around 200 CE) and discuss the topic of the day with ordinary people from the era, to try to learn which of their interpretations is correct.

Almost all the chapters addressed interpretation and clarification of basic Talmud concepts.

== The meaning of "Shnaim Ohazin" ==
Baruch Bar and Ori Oriah at their study tables.

The name of the show is Shnaim Ohazin (Two who are holding) with a double meaning: The show speaks of studying the Talmud, and "Shnaim Ohazin" is one of the famous Talmud chapters dealing with a division Principle, and also the name suggests that there are two teachers holding the Gemara and are learning and teaching it.

The point of this is explained by Dr. Yehuda Schwartz:

"The Talmudic study is active with negotiating in a "Havruta" while viewing is passive. The study of the Talmud is mostly textual, while the television medium is not characterized by book and words. On top of that, study of the Talmud involves continual negotiation between the study partners, and this is difficult to present by television. The solution to these problems is found in the broadcast through creation of a dialogue between two participants: "Bar" and "Orian". The broadcast does not come in order to replace the study of Talmud but it is used as a helping instrument along with a guide to the teacher and paper assignments for the student."

The names of the teachers on the show also hold a symbolic meaning: the names of both teachers Baruch Bar and Ori Orian (Hebrew: ברוך בר ואורי אוריין) are an alliteration, their last names put together composes the term "Bar Orian" (Son/Student of the Torah in Aramaic, or "scholar" in Modern Hebrew). The name of Bar and Orian's teacher also suggests of his role: Shlomo Melamed (Hebrew: מלמד, Teaches).

== Cast ==
Director:

- Arie Ben Tsion

Actors:

- Baruch Bar: Itsik Sayidoff
- Ori Orian: Avi Oriah
- Shlomo Melamed (Teacher of Bar and Orian): Shmulik (Shmuel) Segal

Guest actors:

- Gabi Amrani
- Eli Gorenstein
- Michal Jacob
- Armando Bismont
- Eitan Ben-Dov
- Dudik Smadar
- Ariel Fridan
- Gilad Baum

== Chapters ==
1. Ha Minei
2. Problem - Part A
3. Problem - Part B
4. Heicah Dami - Part A
5. Heicah Dami - Part B
6. Verminehu - Part A
7. Verminehu - Part B
8. Mai Tama
9. Who is afraid of Aramaic
10. Pshita - Part A
11. Pshita - Part B
12. Mena Hani Milei
13. Preciseness

== See also ==
- Oral Torah
- Hillel and Shammai

== Notes ==
=== Bibliography ===
- Benjamin Domovitz, Shnaim Ohazin - Teacher's guide, Ministry of Education Tel Aviv 5749 (1988-1989).
- Benjamin Domovitz, Article "Shnaim Ohazin - Television series for teaching of terms, concepts and issues of the Talmud", "Shmaatin" magazine 5750 (1989-1990), Issue 99 pgs. 40-46.
