= Liora Rivlin =

Israeli actress

- לאורה ריבלין
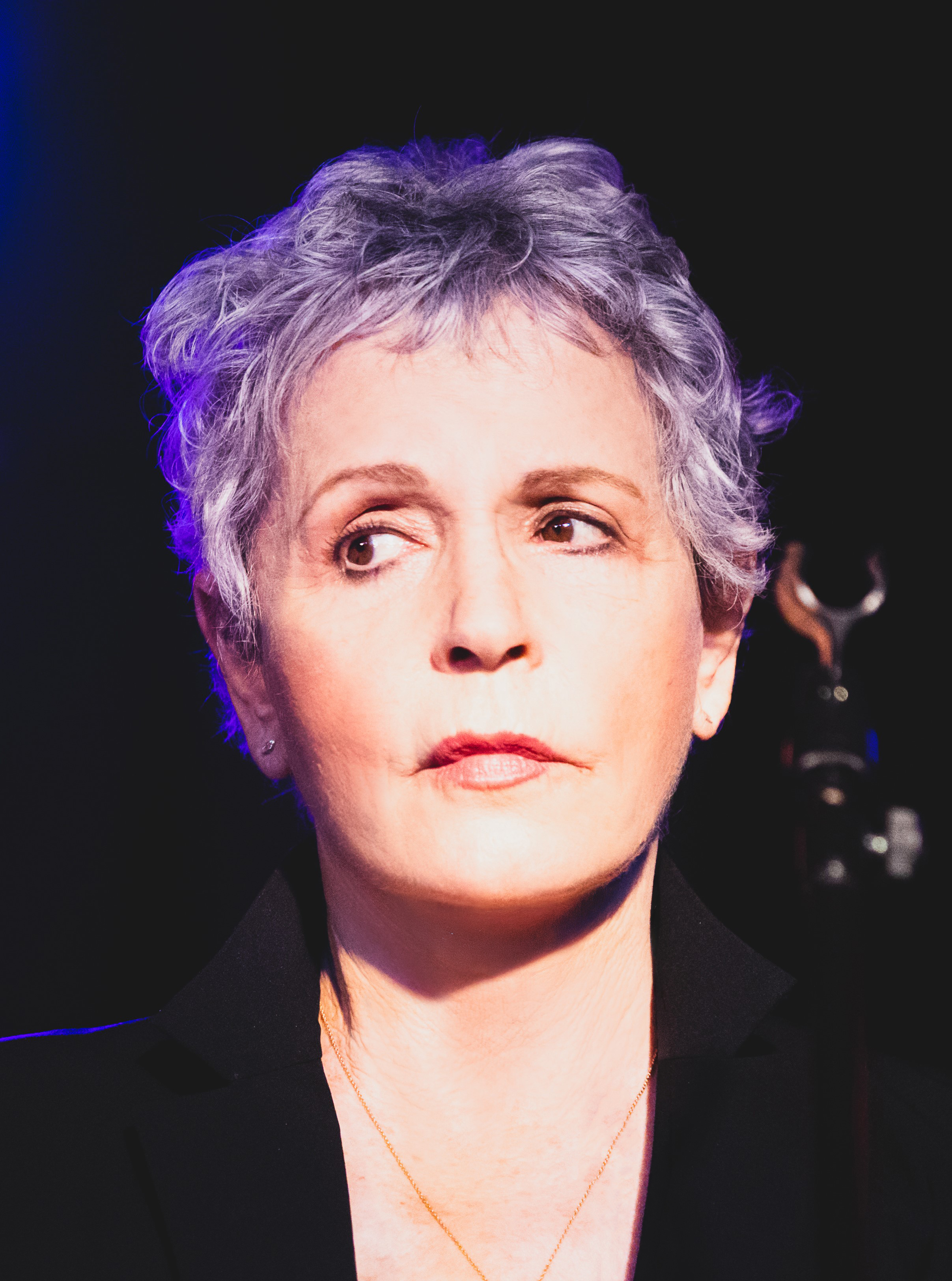
- March 2022
- Born: November 18, 1944 (age 81); Tel Aviv, Mandatory Palestine
- Occupation: Actress
- Spouse(s): Gedalia Besser; Oded Kotler (divorced)

Liora Rivlin (Hebrew: לאורה ריבלין; also romanized as Leora; born November 18, 1944) is an Israeli actress, playwright, and singer-songwriter whose career spans theater, film, and television. She is one of the only actresses in Israel to have won the big three national acting awards: the Israel Theater Prize, Israeli Television Academy Award, and Ophir Award for film.

== Awards and nominations ==
=== Ophir Awards ===
Formally known as the Israel Film Academy Awards.

| Year | Category | Nominated work | Result | Ref. |
|---|---|---|---|---|
| 2013 | Best Supporting Actress | She Is Coming Home | Won | |
| 2020 | Best Supporting Actress | God of The Piano | Nominated | |

=== Israeli Television Academy Awards ===
| Year | Category | Nominated work | Result | Ref. |
|---|---|---|---|---|
| 2018 | Best Actress in a Drama Series | The Conductor | Nominated | |
| 2023 | Best Actress in a Comedy Series | Seven Figures | Won | |
| 2024 | Best Supporting Actress in a Comedy Series | Berlin Blues | Won | |

=== Israel Theater Prize ===
| Year | Category | Nominated work | Result | Ref. |
|---|---|---|---|---|
| 2001 | Best Actress in a Leading Role | Return to the Desert | Won | |
| 2004 | Best Supporting Actress | Accident | Won | |
| 2015 | Best Actress in a Leading Role | Old-New Story | Won | |

=== Other ===
| Year | Organization | Award | Result | Ref. |
|---|---|---|---|---|
| 2019 | Israeli Artists' Association | Lifetime Achievement Award | Won | |
