= Shraga Bishgada =

- Genre: Children's comedy
- Starring: Moni Moshonov, Stav Idisis, Dvori Reese
- Country of origin: Israel
- Original language: Hebrew
- No. of seasons: 6
- No. of episodes: 180

Production
- Running time: 15 minutes
- Production company: Artza Productions

Original release
- Network: Israeli Educational Television
- Release: 2013 – 2016

Shraga Bishgada (Hebrew: שרגא בישגדא) is an Israeli children's comedy television series broadcast on the Israeli Educational Television, starring Moni Moshonov.

== Background ==
Shraga writes a daily live blog about important personalities. On his blog, Shraga reviews notable public figures whom have contributed to science, art, culture, health, society and politics. However, he encounters problems and manages to solve them with the help of his neighbor Aliza and housekeeper Neta.

== Characters ==
- Shraga (Moni Moshonov) - the main character.
- Neta (Stav Idisis) - Shraga's clever housekeeper. With her help, Shraga learns things and solves problems.
- Aliza (Dvori Reese) - Shraga's neighbor, who frequently watches his blog.

== Episodes ==
Every episode is about a notable public figure. During the original release of the show, these were the people that had episodes about them:

=== First season ===
- Leonardo da Vinci - Italian polymath
- Archimedes - Greek mathematician
- Isaac Newton - British mathematician
- Christopher Columbus - Italian explorer
- Martha Graham - American choreographer
- Leah Goldberg - Israeli poet
- Albert Einstein - German scientist
- Salvador Dalí - Spanish artist
- Marcel Marceau - French mime
- Hans Christian Andersen - Dutch author
- Georges Méliès - French film maker
- Galileo Galilei - Italian polymath
- Avraham Shlonsky - Israeli poet
- Alfred Nobel - Swedish chemist
- Mahatma Gandhi - Indian leader
- Thomas Edison - American inventor
- Theodor Herzl - Father of modern Zionism
- William Shakespeare - English poet
- Wolfgang Amadeus Mozart - Austrian composer
- Charlie Chaplin - British actor
- David Ben-Gurion - First Israeli prime-minister
- Marcel Duchamp - French painter
- Astrid Lindgren - Swedish author
- Hayim Nahman Bialik - Hebrew poet
- René Magritte - Belgian painter
- Honoré Daumier - French painter
- Amelia Earhart - American pioneer
- Florence Nightingale - English nurse
- Martin Luther King Jr. - American activist
- Alexander Graham Bell - Scottish inventor

=== Second season ===
- Emile Habibi - Arab writer
- Charles Darwin - English biologist
- Elvis Presley - American singer
- Pablo Picasso - Spanish painter
- Mother Teresa - Albanian saint
- Baron Rothschild - British baron
- Dr. Seuss - American children's writer and illustrator
- Mark Twain - American author
- Shoshana Damari - Israeli singer
- Enid Blyton - English author
- Erich Kästner - German children's writer
- Hanna Rovina - Israeli actress
- Abraham Lincoln - former American president
- Maimonides - Jewish philosopher

=== Third season ===
- Rabbi Akiva - Jewish rabbi
- Eliezer Ben-Yehuda - Hebrew lexicographer, father of modern Hebrew
- Harry Houdini - American illusionist
- Pythagoras - Greek philosopher
- Groucho Marx - American comedian
- Winston Churchill - Former prime-minister of the United Kingdom
- Diogenes - Greek philosopher
- Jonathan Swift - English satirist
- Sara Levi-Tanai - Israeli choreographer
- A. D. Gordon - Russian philosopher
- Mattathias - Jewish priest
- Socrates - Greek philosopher
- C. S. Lewis - British theologian
- Chaim Weizmann - First Israeli president
- Teddy Kollek - Former mayor of Jerusalem
- Arthur Rubinstein - Jewish pianist
- Naguib Mahfouz - Egyptian writer
- Abie Nathan - Israeli peace activist
- Dian Fossey - American zoologist
- Abba Eban - Israeli diplomat
- Yitzhak Ben-Zvi - Former Israeli president
- Orde Wingate - British General
- Kahlil Gibran - Lebanese poet
- Nachum Gutman - Israeli painter
- Alexander the Great - Macedonian conqueror
- Alexander Zaïd - Jewish politician
- Shalom Shabazi - Yemeni rabbi
- Pinhas Rutenberg - Israeli engineer

=== Fourth season ===
- Moses - Lead figure in the Hebrew Bible
- Marshall McLuhan - Canadian philosopher
- Kaytek the Wizard - fictional character
- Cleopatra - Egyptian monarch
- Menachem Mendel of Kotzk - Polish rabbi
- Doctor Dolittle - Fictional character
- Don Quixote - Fictional character
- Poseidon - Greek god of the sea
- Franz Kafka - Bohemian author
- Pocahontas - Native american
- Napoleon - French emperor
- John Lennon - English singer
- Miriam - Sister of Moses
- Henrik Ibsen - Norwegian playwright
- Hershel - Jewish jester
- Ya'akov Hodorov - Israeli footballer
- Gerald Durrell - British zookeeper and author
- Andy Warhol - American artist
- Narcissus - Greek hunter
- Coco Chanel - French designer
- Jim Henson - American puppeteer
- Ralph Klein - Israeli basketball player
- Anwar Sadat - Former Egyptian president
- Zhuang Zhou - Chinese philosopher
- Eugène Ionesco - Playwright
- Edward A. Murphy Jr. - American engineer
- Hippocrates - Greek physician
- Calliope - Muse of poetry
- Mustafa Kemal Atatürk - Founding father of Turkey
- Isaac Asimov - American writer

=== Fifth season ===
- Shaike Ophir - Israeli comedian
- David Livingstone - Scottish explorer
- Sun Tzu - Chinese general
- Marco Polo - Italian explorer
- Jethro - Biblical figure
- Farid al-Atrash - Egyptian musician
- Yigael Yadin - Israeli politician
- Patanjali - Indian scholar
- Antoni Gaudí - Spanish architect
- Walter Gropius - German architect
- Solon - Greek statesman
- Oscar Niemeyer - Brazilian architect
- Eleanor - French duchess
- Peter Pan - Fictional character
- Sigmund Freud - Austrian psychiatrist
- Struwwelpeter - German children's book character
- Johan Huizinga - Dutch historian
- Ayin Hillel - Israeli poet
- Christina - Former queen of Sweden
- Nahshon - Biblical figure
- Shalom Aleichem - Jewish poet
- Keith Haring - American artist
- Baron Munchausen - fictional German nobleman
- Sasha Argov - Israeli composer
- Neil Armstrong - American astronaut, first man to walk on the Moon
- Ephraim Kishon - Israeli author
- Abraham Goldfaden - Yiddish playwright
- Sappho - Greek poet

=== Sixth season ===
- Menachem Begin - Former Israeli prime-minister
- Fadwa Tuqan - Palestinian poet
- Wassily Kandinsky - Russian painter
- James Naismith - Canadian physician, Inventor of basketball
- Kurt Weill - German composer
- Bertolt Brecht - German playwright
- Danny Kaye - American actor
- Clara Barton - American nurse, founder of the American Red Cross
- Igor Stravinsky - Russian composer
- Ian Fleming - English author
- Rita Levi-Montalcini - Italian neurologist
- Marie Curie - Polish chemist
- Nathan Alterman - Israeli poet
- L. L. Zamenhof - Polish linguist, inventor of Esperanto language
- Ibn Battuta - Berber explorer
- Gregor Mendel - Silesian scientist
- Federico Fellini - Italian film-maker
- Ibn Gabirol - Jewish philosopher
- Joseph Lister - British surgeon
- Judah Halevi - Jewish philosopher
- Édith Piaf - French singer
- Meir Dizengoff - Jewish politician
- Invention of the wheel - The only episode not about a personality
- Jules Verne - French author
- L. Frank Baum - Children's writer
- Louis Pasteur - French chemist
- Yitzhak Navon - Former president of Israel
- Marc Chagall - Jewish artist
- Aristophanes - Greek playwright
- Susan B. Anthony - American women's rights activist
- Alan Turing - English mathematician
- Louis Armstrong - American musician
- Maya Angelou - American poet
