= Lior Ashkenazi =

Israeli actor

- ליאור אשכנזי
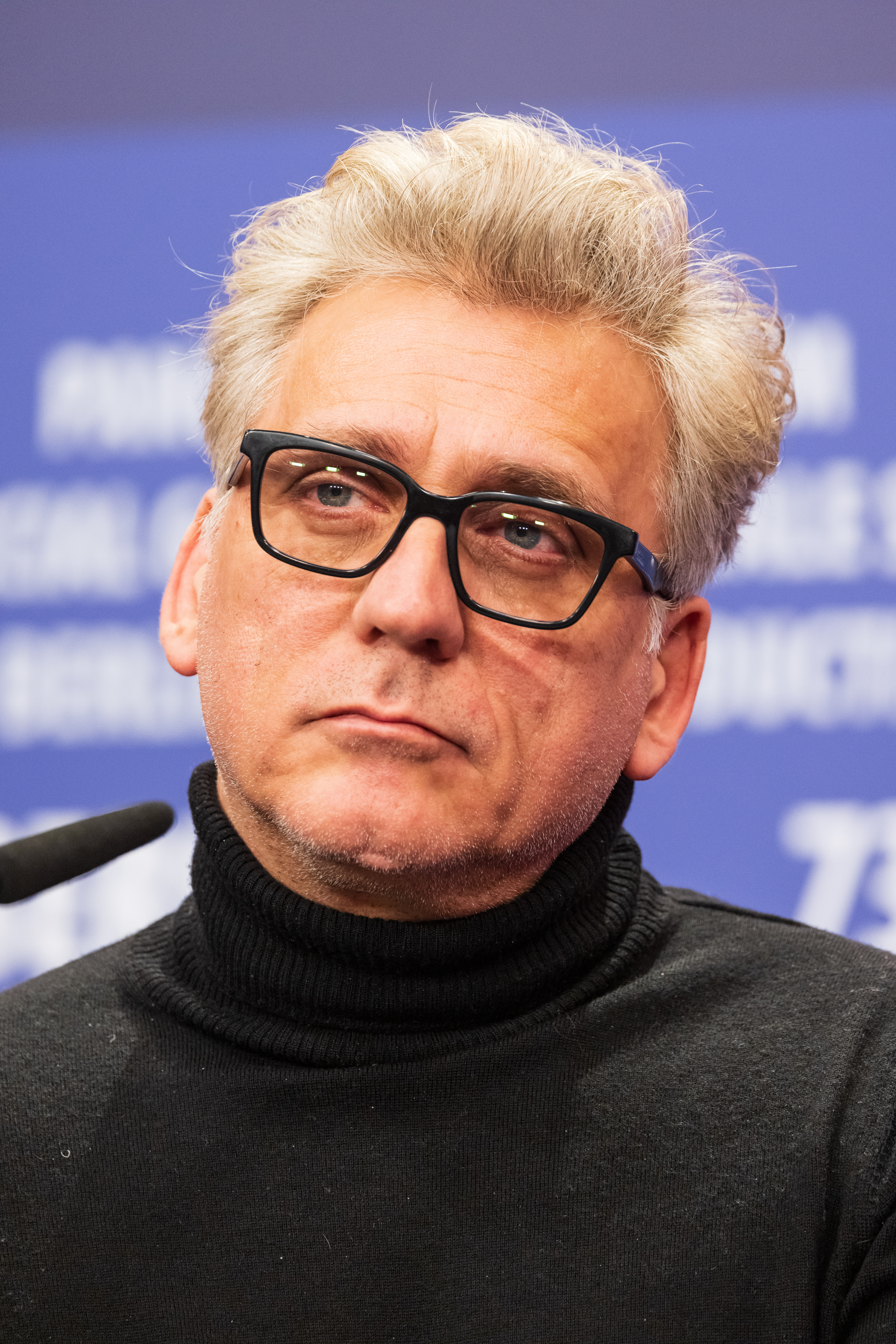
- Ashkenazi in 2023
- Born: Lior Louis Ashkenazi; 28 December 1968 (age 57); Ramat Gan, Israel
- Occupations: Actor; voice actor; comedian; television presenter
- Years active: 1993–present
- Spouses: Shira Farber (div. 2005) Maya Amsellem (m. 2011)
- Children: 2

Lior Ashkenazi (Hebrew: ליאור אשכנזי; born 28 December 1968) is an Israeli actor, voice actor, comedian and television presenter. Regarded as one of the best performers of his generation in Israel, he is recognized for his versatile work across independent films, television and the stage. He has received numerous accolades, including three Ophir Awards.

A graduate of Beit Zvi, he began his career on the Israeli stage. He had a breakout role playing Zaza, the son of Georgian Jewish immigrants in Late Marriage (2001). He also starred in Walk on Water (2004), Footnote (2011) and Foxtrot (2017). He is also known to international audiences for his role in Golda (2023). He has appeared on television in Our Boys (2019), Valley of Tears (2020) and most recently in Hulu's We Were the Lucky Ones (2024).

== Biography ==
Lior Ashkenazi was born in Ramat Gan, Israel, and grew up in the Neveh Yehoshua neighborhood. His parents are Sephardic Jews from Turkey who immigrated to Israel in 1964. His father, Shmuel, worked as a printer. His mother, Victoria, was a housewife. His parents spoke Ladino at home, and it was his first language. At the age of 16, in the wake of problems in school, he moved to Kibbutz Regavim.

Ashkenazi served as a paratrooper in the Israel Defense Forces, and was stationed in the Israeli-occupied West Bank during the First Intifada.

Ashkenazi was first married to Israeli actress Shira Farber, with whom he had his first daughter. After his divorce, he had a relationship with Israeli playwright and screenwriter Sigal Avin. In December 2011, he married Israeli producer Maya Amsellem. They had a daughter in August 2012.

== Acting and film career ==
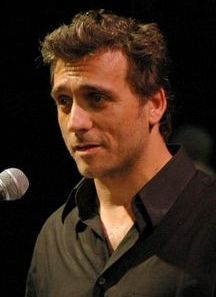
Ashkenazi in 2006

He studied acting at Beit Zvi. After graduating in 1994, he worked for Habima and Beersheba Theater. Simultaneously, he featured at the Beit Zvi Theater in productions like "Job's Passion," "N.B. Your cat is dead," "Brothers in blood," "The one who gets slapped," "Measure against measure," and "Photos." He starred in many plays at Beit Lessin Theater under the direction of Zipi Pines. He also appeared with the Cameri Theater in Tel Aviv, although Beit Lessin remained his home base. His breakout role came in Late Marriage alongside Ronit Elkabetz in 2001.

In 2016 he appeared alongside Richard Gere in the political drama, Norman. Ashkenazi won an Ophir Award for Best Lead Actor for his performance in the 2017 film, Foxtrot, Israel's entry for the Best Foreign Language Film at the 90th Academy Awards. In November 2018 Ashkenazi appeared in Shakespeare's The Tempest, a joint production between the Old Globe Theatre and the Los Angeles Philharmonic.

In 2019 Ashkenazi appeared in HBO's show Our Boys, an American-Israeli series. In late 2023, it was announced in Deadline Hollywood that he would play the lead role in Mosolov's Suitcase. Filming completed in the first quarter of 2024.

Ashkenazi is also a Hebrew-language dubber. He dubbed Li Shang in the 1998 Disney film Mulan and the 2005 sequel as well as the title character in Bolt.

== Filmography ==
=== Film ===
Year	Title	Role	Notes
1996	Pocahontas	Kocoum (voice)	Hebrew dub
1998	Mulan	Captain Li Shang (voice)	Hebrew dub
1999	Tarzan	Adult Tarzan (voice)	Hebrew dub
2001	Late Marriage (Hatuna Meuheret)	Zaza	
2003	Rutenberg (Ish HaHashmal, Electricity Man)	Leonard	
2003	A Gift from Above (Matana MiShamayim)	Otri	
2004	Walk on Water (Lalechet Al HaMaim)	Eyal	
2004	Home on the Range	Buck Horse (voice)	Hebrew dub
2005	Mulan II	Captain Li Shang (voice)	Hebrew dub
2006	The Bubble (HaBuah)	Himself	Cameo
2008	Bolt	Bolt (voice)	Hebrew dub
2008	Hello Goodbye	Yossi	French film
2009	Ultimatum	Gil	Italian film
2010	Rabies (Kalevet)	Danny	The first horror feature ever from Israel
2011	Footnote	Uriel Shkolnik	
2012	Karon	Michael	Short film
2012	Yossi	Moti	
2013	Big Bad Wolves	Micki	
2014	The Dune	Hanoch	French film
2015	Encirclements	Bezalel Ninio	
2016	Norman	Micha Eshel	
2017	Foxtrot	Michael Feldmann	
2018	7 Days in Entebbe	Yitzhak Rabin	
2019	My Zoe	Secretary of State Ken Stanitzke	
2022	Karaoke	Itzik	
2023	Golda	David Elazar	
2024	Mosolov’s Suitcase	The Filmmaker	

=== Television ===
Year	Title	Role	Notes
2005	BeTipul	Yadin Yerushalmi	
2012	Nesuuim plus	Shuky Avrahami	Hebrew version of Married... with Children (his character based on Al Bundy)
2013	The Missionary	Yonatan Gall	TV pilot
2016	Ikaron HaHachlafa	Atlas	Lead role
2019–present	Eretz Nehederet	Benny Gantz / Yoni Rechter / Various Characters	
2020	Valley of Tears	Meni Ben-Dror	
2021	Hit & Run	Assaf	Netflix series
2022	Boged (Traitor)	Georgi	Lead role
2024	We Were The Lucky Ones	Sol	Disney+/Hulu series
2025	One Day in October	Ofer Lieberman	Episode: "Gatekeeper"

== Awards and nominations ==
Year	Award	Category	Nominated work	Result	Ref.
2001	Israeli Film Academy	Best Actor	Late Marriage	Won	
2001	Israeli Film Academy	Best Supporting Actor	Rutenberg (Ish HaHashmal)	Nominated	
2004	Israeli Film Academy	Best Actor	Walk on Water	Nominated	
2011	Israeli Film Academy	Best Supporting Actor	Footnote	Won	
2017	Israeli Film Academy	Best Actor	Foxtrot	Won	
2015	Fangoria Chainsaw Awards	Best Actor	Big Bad Wolves	Nominated	

== Personal life ==
Askenazi has a daughter from his previous marriage to screenwriter and actress Shira Farber, whom he divorced in 2005. In July 2011, he married film producer and distributor Maya Amsellem, whom he met a year earlier when they both worked on the film "Footnote." They had a daughter together in August 2012.

In several interviews, Askenazi has admitted that he sometimes provides false information about his personal life.
