= Rega im Dodley =

- Title card
- רגע עם דודלי
- Written by: Tamar Adar; Dudu Topaz; Oded Burla; Shlomo Nitzan
- Directed by: Shoshana Tzachor
- Starring: Tzipi Mor; Shlomo Nitzan; Sefi Rivlin
- Country of origin: Israel
- Original language: Hebrew
- No. of seasons: 1
- No. of episodes: 24

Production
- Producer: Shoshana Tzachor
- Running time: 30 minutes

Original release
- Network: Israeli Educational Television
- Release: October 27, 1976 – December 27, 1981

Related
- At Fistuk's Home

Rega im Dodley (Hebrew: רגע עם דודלי (Note: The title is a pun: it may be translated either as Rega with Dodley or A Moment with Dodley, because Rega is the name of the puppet.) was an Israeli children’s television show. Produced by Israeli Educational Television, the program aired from 1976 to 1981, after which it then aired in reruns. With the exception of one episode, the entire series was filmed in black and white, and was produced by Shoshana Tzachor, who also produced another popular Israeli children’s program, Parpar Nechmad.

== Format ==
The show featured Dodley, a grocery store owner, his companion Rega, a marionette that became a child, and Fistuk, as well as guest stars and an ensemble of children. Most episodes would take place in Dodley’s store, which was also home to the robot-like contraption Havitush. However, some episodes also took place outside of the shop and in the Ramat Aviv neighbourhood where the series was filmed.

The show aimed to educate children on topics such as friendship and helping others, as well as expanding their knowledge in diverse topics such as communication, and the differences between adults and children.

Each program opened with a short animated segment featuring a bird called Tzipi. These shorts were animated by Tuvia Kurtz, who also designed the butterfly puppets for Parpar Nechmad ("Nice Butterfly").

== Production ==
With color television in Israel only being gradually introduced during the series’ run, Rega im Dodley was predominantly filmed in black and white at the Israeli Educational Television studios in Tel Aviv. However, one episode, in which the characters visit a port, was filmed in color outside of the studio using a recently purchased mobile broadcasting facility that fully permitted for color broadcasts and filming.

Six of the episodes, including the first episode, had been considered lost, as IETV did not convert the original 16mm film into a modern format. However, as of 2008, all episodes had been successfully recovered, restored and archived on modern broadcast tapes.

== Characters ==
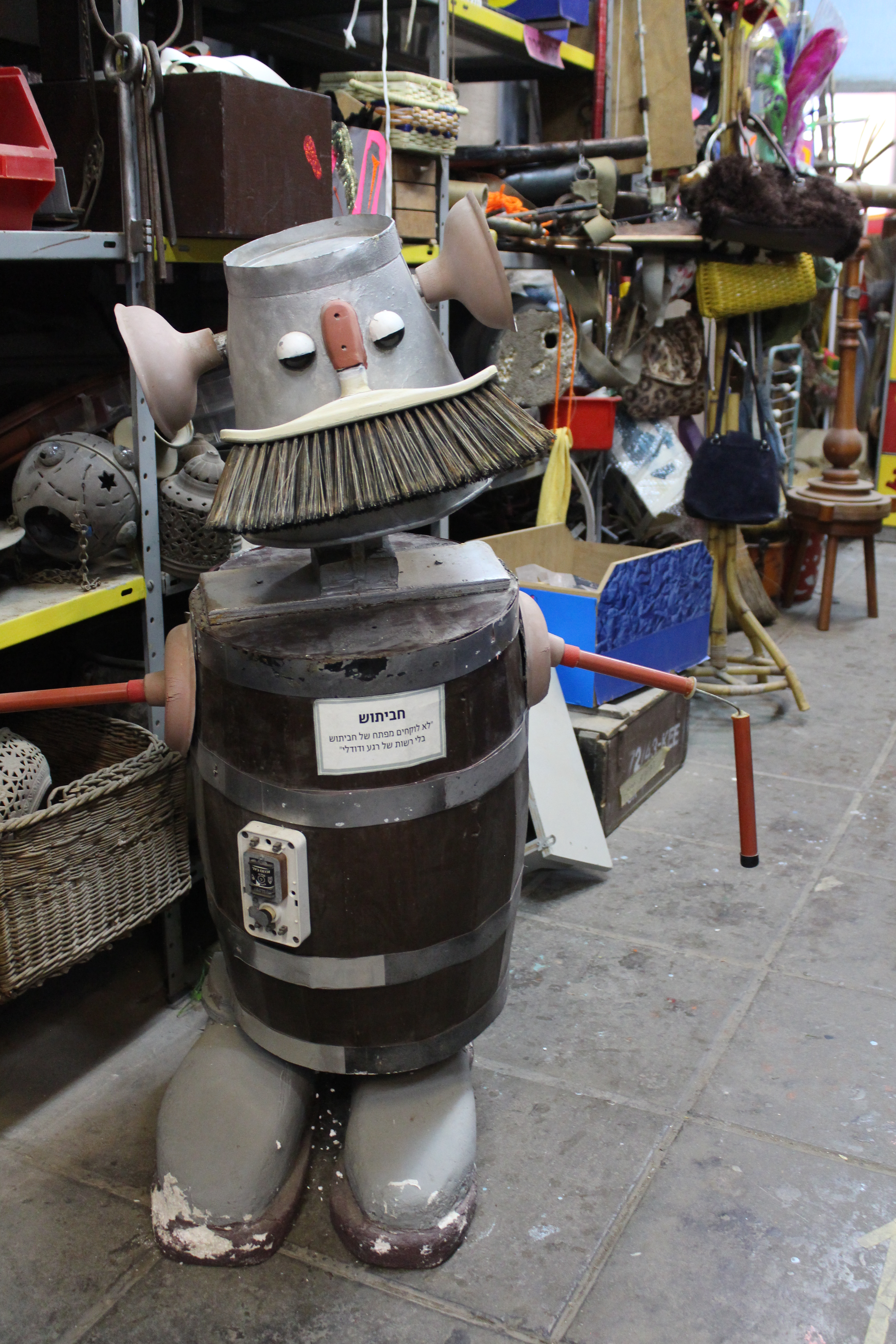
Havitush in the TV props storage

- Rega (רגע, Moment) is a boy marionette who came to life, becoming a child. He is played by female actress Tzipi Mor.
- Dodley (דודלי, meaning 'uncle of mine') is the neighborhood grocery store owner, who lives alone near his store. He is played by Shlomo Nitzan.
- Fistuk (פיסטוק, Pistachio) is friends with Dodley and Rega. He is kind, but also quite clumsy. Played by Sefi Rivlin.
- Havitush (חביתוש, Pancake) - A barrel-bodied robot made of household items that lives in Dodley’s store; he can talk and move like a human provided that the spring in his mechanism is stretched with a key. He is also voiced by Nitzan.

== See also ==
- List of programs broadcast by the Israeli Educational Television
