= Judaeo-Georgian =

Georgian dialect spoken by Georgian Jews

Judeo-Georgian
- Gruzinic, Qivruli
- ყივრული
- Native to: Georgia, Israel, Russia, Belgium, United States
- Native speakers: 60,000 (2015–2018)
- Language family: Kartvelian: Karto-Zan; Georgian; Judeo-Georgian
- Writing system: Georgian script Aramaic script

Language codes
- ISO 639-3: jge
- Glottolog: jude1258

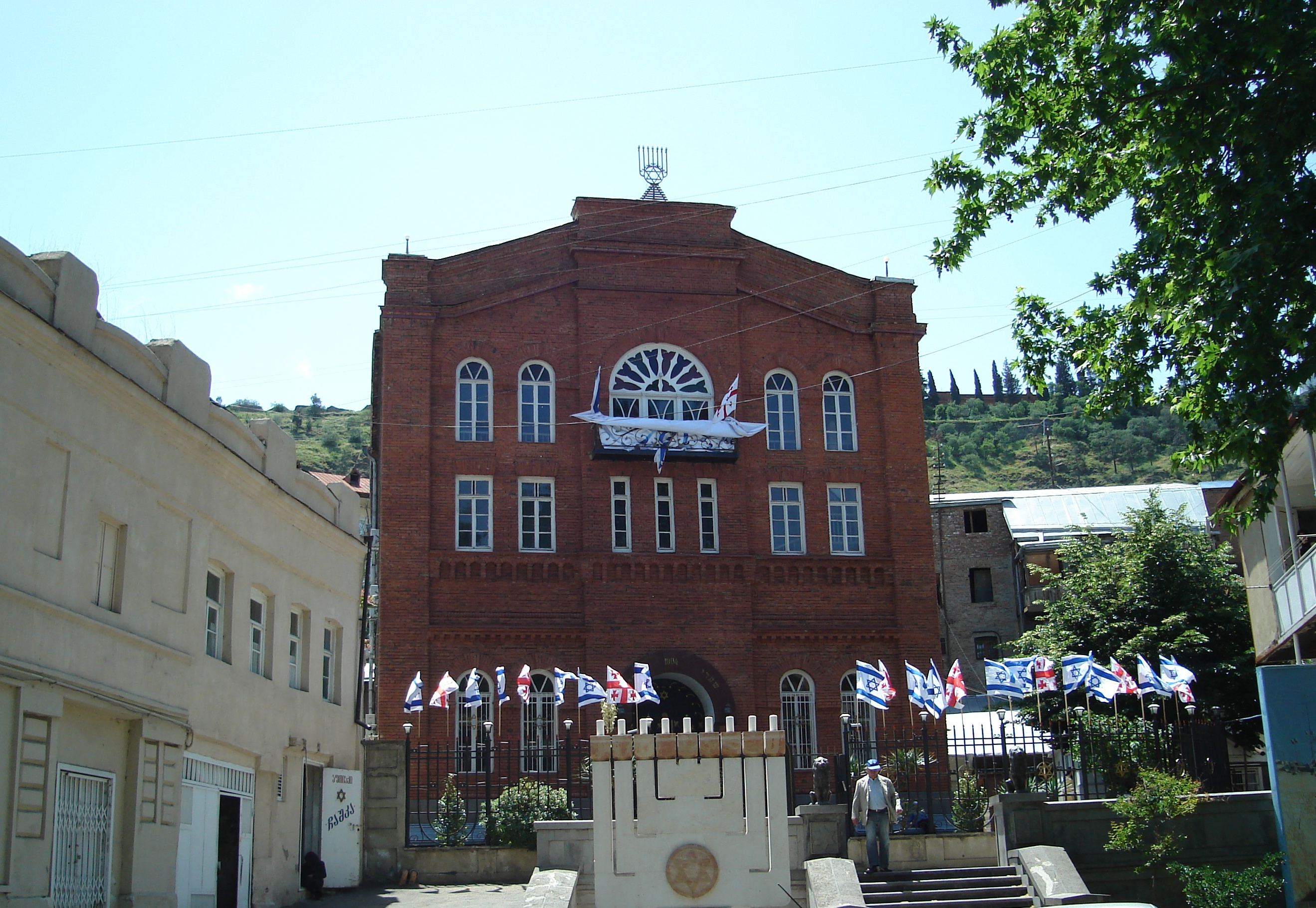
A chief synagogue in Tbilisi decorated with the Georgian and Israeli flags on the occasion of Georgia's Independence Day celebration. May, 2008.

Judeo-Georgian, known endonymically as Qivruli (Judeo-Georgian: ყივრული ენა) and also known as Gruzinic, is the traditional Georgian dialect spoken by the Georgian Jews, the ancient Jewish community of the South Caucasus nation of Georgia. The name Qivruli comes from the Hebrew עבר ʿeber meaning 'the other side' or 'across'.

== History ==
Georgian-speaking Jews maintain one of the oldest Jewish communities in the world. The most popular theory on the origins of Georgian Jewry is that the first Jews in Georgia arrived 2600 years ago after escaping Babylonian captivity.

== Relationship to other languages ==
Judaeo-Georgian is the only Kartvelian Jewish dialect. Its status as a distinct language from the Georgian language is the subject of some debate.

With the exception of a significant number of Hebrew and Aramaic loanwords, the language is reportedly largely mutually intelligible with Georgian.

== Distribution ==
In the beginning of the late 19th century, there were large Jewish communities across Georgia, including Tbilisi, Kutaisi, and Tskhinvali. Small Jewish communities existed across almost every part of Georgia with a synagogue in nearly all villages and cities. The religious leaders of these were referred to as rabini or xaxami, the Georgia term for 'rabbi' and 'wise', respectively.

Judaeo-Georgian has approximately 85,000 speakers. These include 20,000 speakers in Georgia (1995 est.), and about 59,800 speakers in Israel (2000 est.). The language has approximately 4,000 speakers in New York and undetermined numbers in other communities in the United States, Russia, Belgium, and Canada.

== Status ==
Judaeo-Georgian is, like many Jewish languages spoken there, on the decline in Israel. Its status in Georgia itself is unchanged, except by the rapid decline in the size of the language community, due to emigration beginning in the 1970s, which has seen the departure of some 80% of the community. Authoritative studies of its continued use by other expatriate communities of Georgian Jews have not been conducted.

== Vocabulary ==
Judaeo-Georgian vocabulary differs from standard Georgian in two main ways. The first involves differences among native Georgian vocabulary such as using different meanings for words such as jamaati which means 'gathering' in standard Georgian, but 'minyan' in Judaeo-Georgian, and using certain words more frequently such as damadlianda meaning 'was blessed'. The second involves the use of loanwords in Hebrew and Aramaic not used in standard Georgian such as xupa 'chuppah' (Heb. חופה ḥuppa), xaxami 'rabbi' (Heb. חכם ḥaxam 'wise'), and pesaxi 'Passover' (Heb. פסח pesaḥ).

== Sample Text ==
The following text is a Judeo-Georgian translation of the song Echad Mi Yodea:

Georgian Script
Transliteration
English translation

ერთი ვინ იცის? ერთი მე ვიცი, ერთი
რძანდება ღმერთი ჩვენი მაღლა
მცებში და შინა დედამიწაზედა.

erti vin icis? erti me vici, erti
brdzandeba ghmerti chveni magla
mcebshi da shina dedamits'azeda.

Who knows the one? I know the one,
Our Lord up in heaven and over the earth
Is the One.

ცამეტი ვინ იცის? ცამეტი მე
ვიცი. ცამეტი რიგები, თორმეტი
შებატიმები, თერთმეტი
ვარსკვლავები იოსებისა,
ათი ბრძანება, ცხრა თვეები
მშობიარობისა, რვა დღეები
მილისა, შვიდი დღეები შაბათისა,
ექვსი წყობა მიშნისა, ხუთი ხუმაში
თორისა, ოთხი დედები, სამი მამები,
ორი ლუხოთ აბერითი, ერთი
ბრძანდება ღმერთი ჩვენი მაღლა
მცებში და შინა დედამიწაზედა.

camet'i vin icis? camet'i me vici, camet'i rigebi
tormet'i shebatimebi, tertmet'i varsk'vlavebi iosebisa,
ati brdzaneba siaize, ckhra
tveebi mshobiarobisa, rva
dgheebi milisa, shvidi dgheebi
shabatisa, ekvsi
ts'q'oba mishnisa, khuti
khumashi torisa, otkhi dedebi, sami
mamebi, ori lukhot
aberiti, erti brdzandeba ghmerti
chveni magla mcebshi da shina
dedamits'azeda.

Who knows the thirteen? I know the thirteen.
There are thirteen principles,
twelve Shebbatim,
eleven stars of Joseph,
ten commandments on the Mount Sinai,
nine months of pregnancy,
eight days of milah,
Seven days of Shabbat,
Six books of the Mishnah,
Chumash Torah, four Mothers (Sarah, Rebecca, Leah, and Rachel),
Three Fathers (Abraham, Isaac, and Jacob), two Luchot Habrit,
Only our Lord up in heaven and over the earth
Is the One.
