= Dover Kosashvili =

Israeli film director

- דובר קוסאשווילי
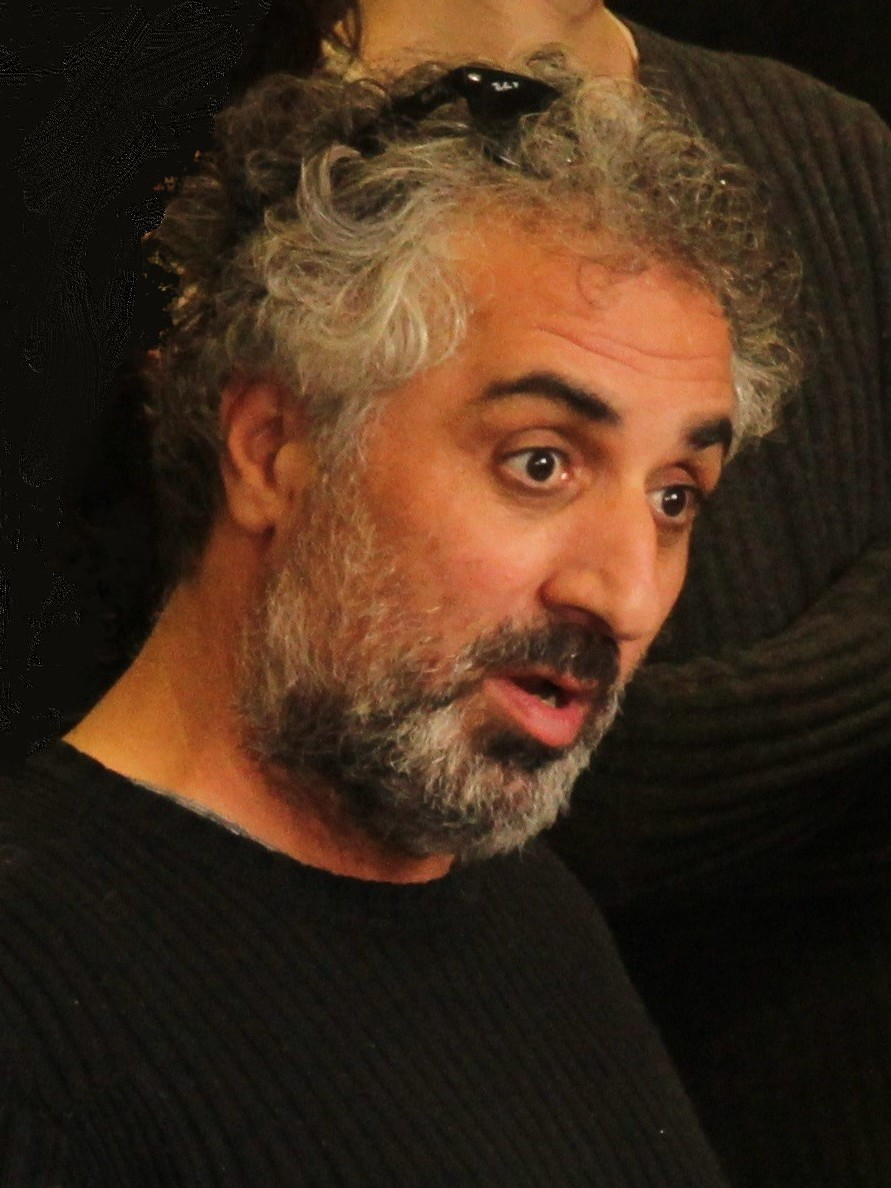
- Born: 8 December 1966 (age 59); Oni, Georgia, Soviet Union
- Occupations: Film director, screenwriter
- Years active: 1998-present

Dover Kosashvili (Hebrew: דובר קוסאשווילי, Georgian: დოვერ ქოსაშვილი; born 8 December 1966) is an Israeli film director and screenwriter of Georgian-Jewish descent. He has directed five films since 1998. His film, Late Marriage, was screened in the Un Certain Regard section at the 2001 Cannes Film Festival.

== Filmography ==
=== Directed ===
- Im Hukim (1998)
- Hatuna Meuheret (Late Marriage) (2001)
- Matana MiShamayim (A Gift from the Sky) (2003)
- Infiltration (2009)
- The Duel (2010)
- Ravaka Plus (Single Plus) (2012)
- Zug Yonim (Love Birds) (2017)

=== Acted in ===
- Matana MiShamayim (A Gift from the Sky) (2003)
- Metumtemet (Dumb) (2016)
- Malkot (Queens) (2018)
- A Regular Day (2018)
- Peaches and Cream (2019)
- Meila (2021)
- Haderech Le'Eilat (2022)
- The 90s (2024)
- Tito and his Spirit (2024)
