= Zehu Ze! =

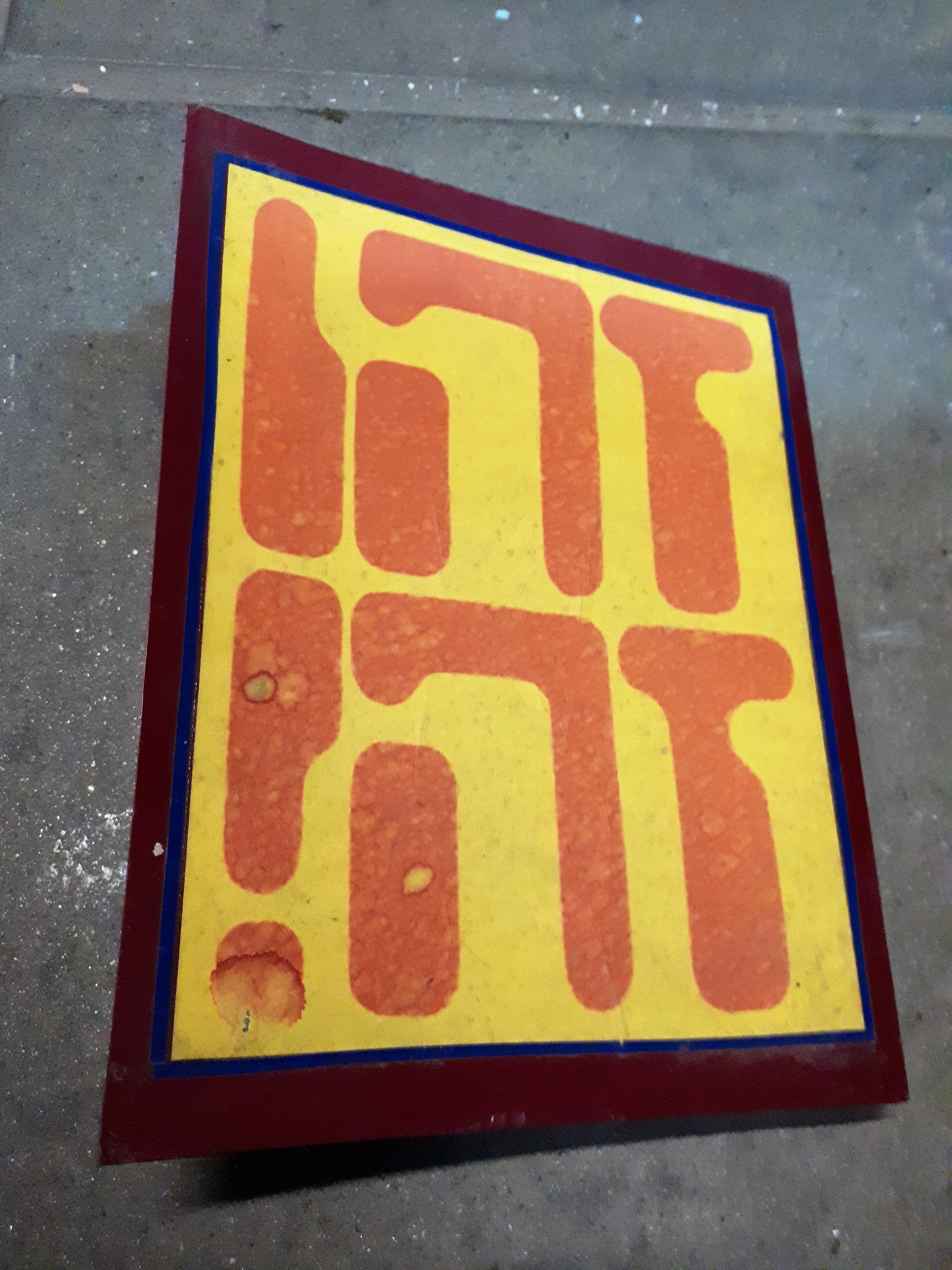
- "The Book of Zehu Ze!" which was used as a prop in one of the season ending episodes
- Also known as: This is it!
- Genre: Sketch comedy, parody, satire.
- Directed by: Irving Kaplan; Moti Mizrahi; Risha Tirman
- Starring: Shlomo Bar-Aba; Moni Moshonov; Gidi Gov; Doval'e Glickman; Avi Kushnir; Mati Seri; Moshe Ivgy; Dalik Volinitz; Eli Gorenstein
- Theme music composer: Ehud Manor
- Country of origin: Israel
- Original language: Hebrew
- No. of seasons: 24
- No. of episodes: 600

Production
- Running time: 40-60 minutes per episode

Original release
- Network: Israeli Educational Television and Channel 1 (1978-1995); Channel 2 (Reshet) (1995-1998); Kan 11 (2020-)
- Release: July 4, 1978 – May 1998

Zehu Ze! (Hebrew: זהו זה!, lit. That's it!) is a long-running Israeli entertainment television program, originally produced by Israeli Educational Television (IETV), and broadcast on the Israeli Channel 1 (until 1994) and on Channel 2. The program ran from 1978 to 1998, and was revived in 2020 by the IPBC.

== History ==
Undergoing several format changes during its lifetime, the program was originally promoted as a youth program, and was composed of several comedy segments. The presenters were Moni Moshonov, Shlomo Bar-Aba, and Dalik Volinitz. From the beginning of the 1980s, each episode focused on one subject. The original show's length was about one hour and was broadcast live. The original format included information segments, such as a Rock Music news segment presented by Yoav Kutner, and a riddle segment for the audience to answer by phone (the detective mystery riddles featuring Sefi Rivlin became iconic).

Episodes revolved around subjects related to life in Israel (for example fishermen and the decreasing water level of the Sea of Galilee, or an episode about the electric company), fads like folk dancing, tributes to classics like Charlie Chaplin movies, or contemporary series like The Simpsons and Dallas. The phrase "Wa wa wee wa" meaning "wow" is popular in Israel and was used by British comedian Sacha Baron Cohen as Borat Sagdiyev.

== Revival ==
In March 2020 IPBC announced plans to revive the show as COVID-19 pandemic Special Shows. The original hosts Shlomo Bar-Aba, Moni Moshonov, Gidi Gov, Doval'e Glickman and Avi Kushnir returned. The renewed format includes sketches on varying topics, and a closing song (usually a cover version for an Israeli classic) by the show's cast.

On July 23, 2020, the show was renewed for another season. As of June 2022, the show is into its fifth season in its revival format.

== Awards ==
- 2022: Israeli Academy of Film and Television Awards: Lifetime Achievement Award
- 2023: Members of the cast received an honorary doctorate from Bar-Ilan University.
- 2023: "Knight of Quality Government" in the category Education and Culture from the Movement for Quality Government in Israel
