= Television in Israel =

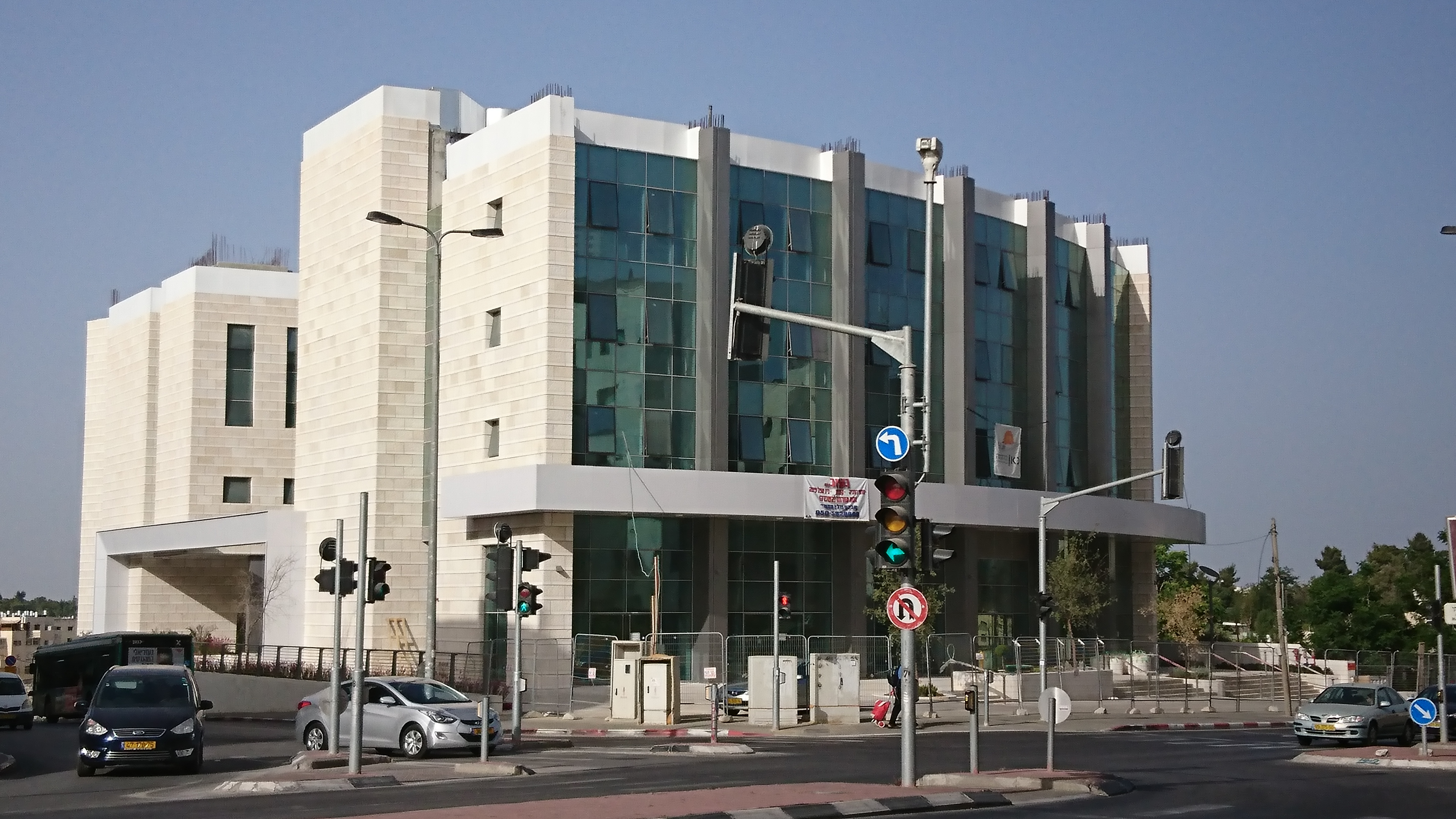
The headquarters of the Israeli Public Broadcasting Corporation in Jerusalem

Television in Israel refers to television broadcasting services in the State of Israel, inaugurated on 24 March 1966. Initially, there was one state-owned channel, operated jointly by the Israel Broadcasting Authority and Israeli Educational Television. In 1986, a second state-regulated channel was launched. This channel became a state-regulated commercial channel in 1993. An additional commercial channel was introduced in 2002, followed by the introduction of three commercial niche channels: an Israeli Russian-speaking channel (in 2002), a channel of Israeli popular music (in 2003) and an Arabic-speaking channel (in 2012). Colour transmissions were introduced gradually around 1977 and 1979. Multichannel cable television service became available to subscribers gradually since 1989, although illegal cable TV stations were present in the big cities during the 1980s. Satellite-based multichannel service has been available since 2000.

Almost 75% of the population is subscribed to pay television systems which are provided by the cable service provider Hot, or by the satellite service provider Yes. The Israel Broadcasting Authority closed in May 2017 and was replaced by the Israeli Public Broadcasting Corporation as the operator of the state-owned television channels. Channel 2 split into two channels in November 2017, giving each of the two remaining commercial companies their own channels, Keshet 12 and Reshet 13.

== History ==
=== Early years of statehood ===
Upon its establishment in May 1948, Israel had one radio station, run directly by the government, which was a continuation of the British Mandate's Hebrew radio station. The first governments, headed by David Ben-Gurion, did not favor the establishment of TV stations. Nevertheless, the Israeli government discussed the idea of using television as an instructional and educational tool in 1952 and 1955. In 1961 the Israeli government asked UNESCO to offer its opinion, which was in favor of using television for educational purposes.In the early 1960s, television broadcasts from neighboring Egypt, Lebanon, and Cyprus gradually became available to Israelis through TV sets which were placed in public places, like cafés. Since they were mainly in Arabic, these broadcasts were popular among Israeli Arabs. This raised the government's concern about anti-Israel propaganda that might be included in them.

When Levi Eshkol assumed power as prime minister in June 1963, he started to promote the establishment of an Israeli TV channel. In 1964, he invited a team of experts from the European Broadcasting Union to submit their recommendations. In 1965, the Israeli Broadcasting Authority was established in order to distance the government from the everyday management and editorial decisions of the state-owned radio station. The government also passed a resolution stating that this new body will start TV broadcasts within two years.

=== Inauguration ===
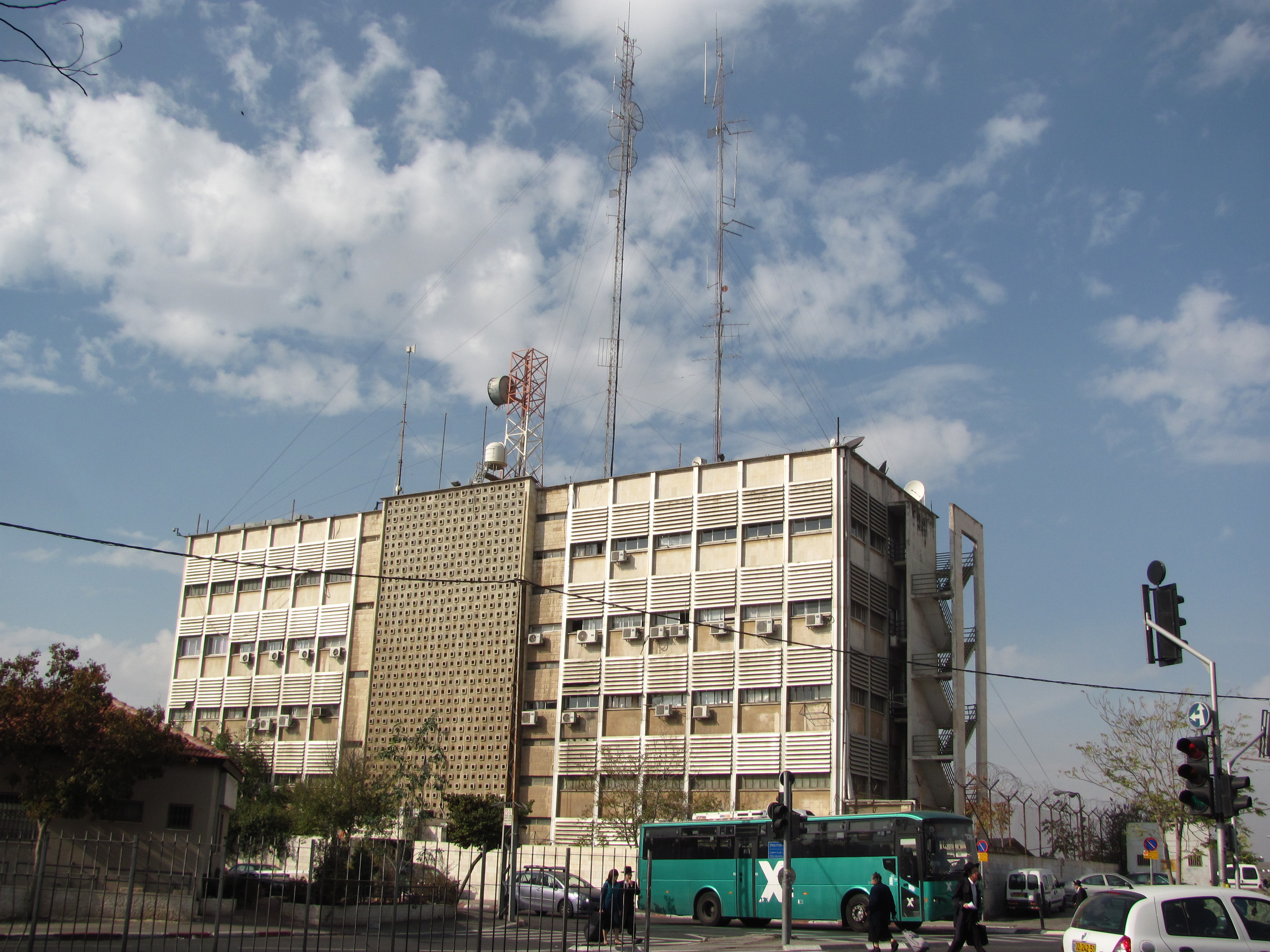
Former Israeli Television Building in Romema, Jerusalem, which used to be the main building for Israel's Channel 1 until 10 May 2017

Television in Israel was finally introduced on 24 March 1966, though not by the IBA, but rather by Israeli Educational Television, which was funded by the Rothschild Foundation and acted as part of the Ministry of Education. The first transmissions were lessons to school students in various subjects, filmed in black and white, and intended to be received by 32 schools across the country. The Israeli Broadcasting Authority launched regular public transmissions on 2 May 1968, on the occasion of Israeli Independence Day. In 1970, it moved entirely to UHF broadcasts, in an attempt to reduce the viewing of television from Jordan (broadcasting the newest American programs), Egypt, and Lebanon, which used VHF. From 1969 it broadcast two hours of Arabic programming daily for Israeli Arabs, the West Bank, and Jordan.

=== Colour transmissions ===
Israeli television began operations when American and European stations were switching to full-scale colour transmissions, but Israel's state-controlled stations broadcast only in black and white. According to Arnon Zuckerman, head of IBA's television department from 1973 to March 1979, Israeli prime minister Golda Meir described colour television as "artificial" and unnecessary. Yair Lapid, son of Tommy Lapid, the IBA director general from April 1979 to March 1984, claimed the IBA had the equipment for filming and broadcasting in colour for nearly a decade before putting it into use, and the introduction of colour transmissions was halted due to political pressure.

Newscasts and other regular productions were filmed using black and white cameras. However many special productions ordered from private Israeli studios (in particular Herzliya Studios) were filmed and taped in colour. Furthermore, Israeli television bought the rights to many American and British TV series and movies (broadcast with Hebrew-Arabic subtitles). The result was a mixture of colour and black and white broadcasts, which encouraged traders to import colour TV sets, especially as TV stations in neighbouring Jordan and Egypt started colour transmissions in 1974.

The Israeli government considered the import of colour televisions as a frivolous luxury that would increase social gaps. Therefore, the government ordered IBA and IETV to erase the colour from colour-taped telecasts by erasing the "burst phase" signal. The "damaged" signal triggered the "colour killer" mechanism, installed in colour TV sets to prevent the appearance of incidental colour spots on the screen when black-and-white films are broadcast or when the reception is disturbed. This method was named mekhikon (Hebrew: מחיקון "eraser"), and soon after its introduction, special TV sets with an anti-mekhikon (Hebrew: אנטי-מחיקון "anti-eraser") device were offered. This device reinstalled the burst phase signal according to several known standards. The client had to turn a switch until the pictures on the screen appeared in natural colours. According to a report in Yediot Aharonoth from January 1979 clients had to manipulate the switch every 15 minutes on average in normal conditions, or up to 10 times an hour when special problems occurred, in order to restore natural colours or if the picture suddenly turned black and white.

Based on information from owners of electric appliance stores, the report estimated that 90% of those who bought colour TV sets also bought the anti-mekhikon device, whose price ranged between IL2,500 and IL4,000 (a TV set itself cost IL40,000–50,000).

The Israeli government allowed colour transmissions by the IBA in November 1977 when IBA provided live colour coverage of the historical visit of the Egyptian president, Anwar El Sadat, to Israel. This transmission was sent via satellite to stations around the world. In March 1979 the IBA hosted the annual Eurovision Song Contest, and once again sent the transmission live in colour to stations around the world.

Public pressure on the issue of colour transmissions mounted, and in 1981 IBA and IETV were allowed to film their own regular productions in colour. This process took more than two years and reached the last stretch on 16 February 1983 when the main daily newscast was broadcast in colour for the first time. According to Lapid's book, this first colour newscast was prepared secretly by some "enthusiastic workers" of IBA, in order to avoid industrial actions by the technicians' trade union, who demanded higher salaries for operating colour equipment. Lapid also mentions that the anti-mekhikon system cost IBA IL180 million yearly (approximately ₪64 million at 2011 prices). The IBA stopped filming in black and white on 10 May 1983.

=== Second channel ===
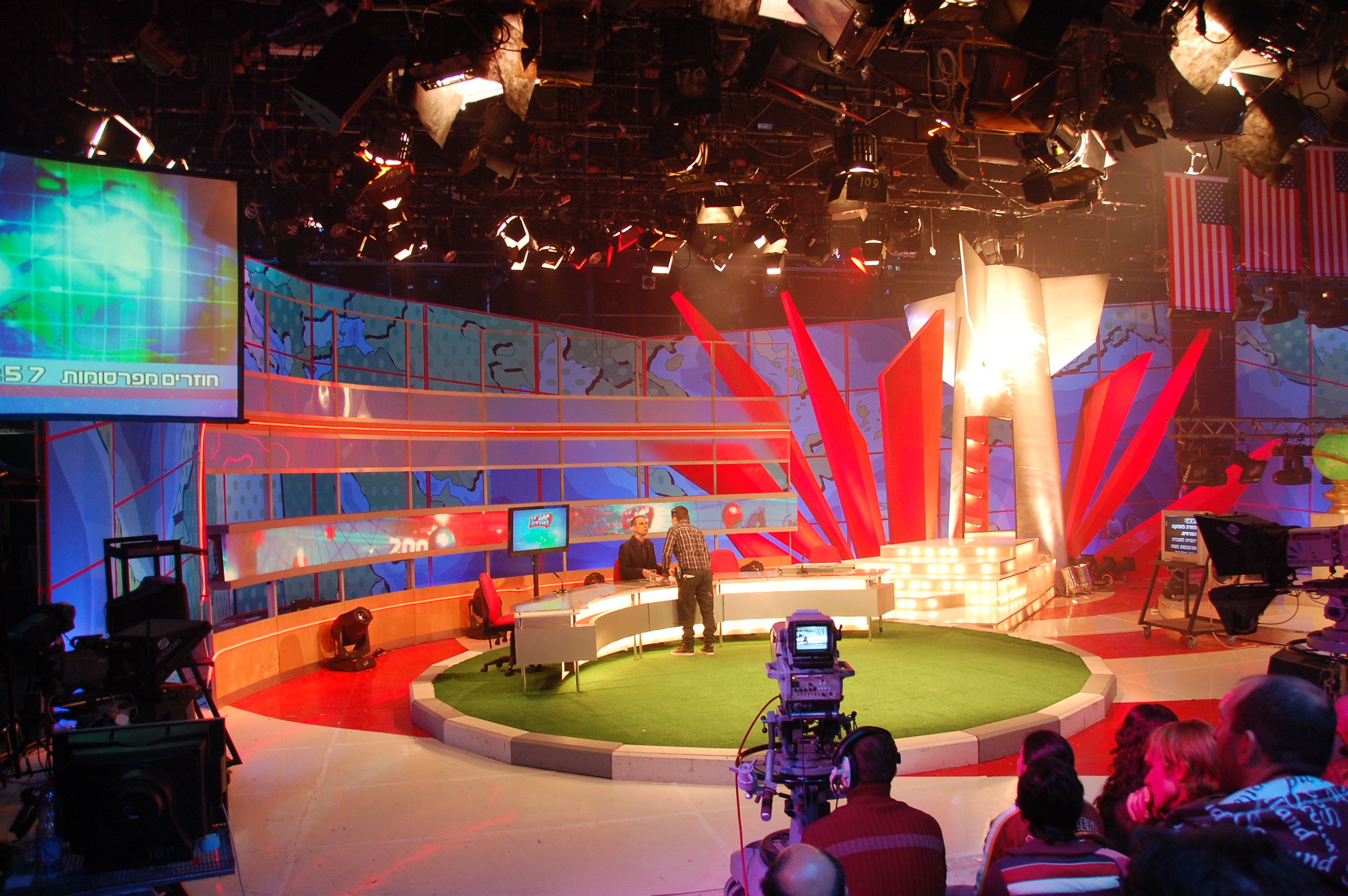
Eretz Nehederet studio

In 1978 the Israeli government appointed a special committee to explore the establishment of a second channel that would not be under the IBA supervision and would be financed by advertising, however the idea of commercial television was rejected by some parties in the ruling coalition. On 7 October 1986, Prof. Amnon Rubinstein, the then Israeli Minister of Communications ordered the beginning of "experimental transmissions" on a second channel, claiming that unless these transmissions had started, the frequencies would have been used by TV networks in neighbouring countries. First transmissions were aired on UHF channel 21 from Mount Eitanim transmission tower situated on the hills west of Jerusalem. These transmissions, which initially included 2–3 hours of video clips every evening and broadcast from a private TV studio in Jerusalem, expanded gradually to include a full program lineup. At this stage the IBA was legally responsible for the channel, but in fact it saw it as an unexpected competition, tried to prevent its inauguration, and was reluctant to take responsibility for its broadcasts. In 1986 the Knesset started discussing the law forming the Second Israeli Broadcasting Authority, which was finally approved in 1990. This new body took responsibility for the second channel from this year onwards. From 1990 to 1993 the Second Broadcasting Authority reviewed bids from commercial companies to establish the regular commercial broadcasts of the second channel, which started on 4 November 1993. The second channel was officially handed to three concessionaires, starting the first commercial broadcasts in Israel, with IETV as the fourth broadcaster which was entitled, by law, for additional hours on this channel as a commercial entity.

=== Multichannel services ===
Pirated television broadcasts via cables became very popular in the major cities of Israel during the late 80s. These were usually local cable television stations broadcasting illegally from private houses to subscribers, mainly films released on video tapes. These local stations vanished with the introduction of regulated cable television in 1989. By mid-1994, some 720,000 Israeli households were hooked up to cable television.

Satellite television was introduced to Israel in 2000. Digital terrestrial television started in August 2009 using the Second Authority's Idan+ platform. Analog television shut down in 2011.

== Technical standards ==
Generally speaking, most television distribution channels in Israel utilize the European Digital Video Broadcasting (DVB) family of standards.

- The Israeli cable TV provider, HOT, uses DVB-C.
- The Israeli satellite TV provider, Yes, uses DVB-S and DVB-S2.
- Digital terrestrial television is transmitted using DVB-T2 (that includes Kan 11 HD).
- Analog terrestrial television transmissions were switched off between 31 March 2011 and 13 June 2011. They have been operated using the PAL colour standard.

=== Digital terrestrial television ===
In August 2009, Israel launched digital terrestrial broadcasts with the intention to phase out the analogue broadcast, under the Idan+ brand. Israel shut down analogue television services on 13 June 2011; the first nation in the Middle East to abandon analogue over-the-air broadcasting. In the early stage there, was only single MUX broadcast in SFN with five channels (Channel 1, Channel 2, Channel 10, Channel 33, Knesset) and later on a sixth TV channel was added (Education 23) and also a selection of public and regional radio stations. By mid-2017 an additional mux was introduced with five new TV channels in DVB-T2 standard, including IPBC's Hebrew channel "Kan 11" channel in HD.

In January 2025, all terrestrial broadcasts are done in the DVB-T2 standard, after the shutdown of MUX1, which broadcast in DVB-T.

=== Cable television ===
Cable television started in Israel in the city of Netanya in 1969, initially to combat poor viewing reception of the existing IBA channel. For this purpose, the Ko-Had (קו־חד) company was established. Its infrastructure also relayed TV channels from neighboring countries, which caused problems with the authorities.

The three cable companies (Matav, Tevel and Golden Channels) merged in 2003 to form Hot.

=== Satellite television ===
Yes, owned by Bezeq, began broadcasting in 2000 using the Amos satellite. In 2025, facing a massive move from satellite to fiber services, Yes moved to IAI's Dror 1 satellite.

== Languages ==
Israeli television broadcasts mainly in Hebrew and English. While Hebrew is the common language of communication, numerous shows and series of different genres are bought from English-speaking countries. Unless the target audience is children, subtitling in Hebrew is preferred over dubbing, not only for economic considerations. Subtitling is often bilingual, the secondary language being either Arabic or Russian. The state-owned Israel Broadcasting Authority (IBA) had an Arabic department which broadcasts news, talk shows, educational programs for children and Egyptian films on IBA's Channel 33. From 15 May 2017, the Arabic channel is operated by the Israeli Public Broadcasting Corporation and is called Makan 33. IBA's English department broadcast a daily locally produced newscast. Commercial channels are obligated to broadcast a portion of their programs in Arabic and Russian, or alternatively translate programs into these languages. There is also a legal obligation on all channels to translate some of their newscasts into the Israeli Sign Language.

In 2002, an Israeli Russian-speaking commercial channel was launched, named Israel Plus. A similar Arabic-speaking channel started broadcasting in March 2012, after several attempts to establish it earlier failed. The first bid for the establishment of this channel was published in 1995, but canceled for formal legal problems. In January 2003, a new bid was published, but the winning company failed to fulfill its financial obligations. A final modified bid was published on 14 April 2010, for which eight companies competed. The Hala TV Company was selected in September 2011.

== Restrictions during religious holidays ==
During religious holidays, especially Yom Kippur, all self-directed television broadcasts (as in Israeli television channels) are suspended, while foreign channels with Hebrew translation halt localization for one day. This also affects Yes and HOT's SVOD services, which renders the services to be blocked during its duration. The rules do not apply for Cellcom, Partner and international streaming services, which don't rely on Israeli regulations. Subscribers of Yes and HOT's VOD service can pre-order content to watch during Yom Kippur. Yes Sting TV, which broadcasts exclusively through the internet (and not satellite) is exempt.

== State-managed stations ==
- Kan 11 (replaced Channel 1 and Channel 1 HD since 15 May 2017)
- Makan 33 (replaced Channel 33 since 15 May 2017)
- Kan Educational (Replaced Israeli Educational Television since 15 August 2018)
- Knesset Channel (The Parliament Channel; its operations are outsourced to private companies via competitive tender)

== Public-commercial stations ==
- Keshet 12 (replaced Channel 2 since 1 November 2017)
- Reshet 13 (replaced Channel 2 since 1 November 2017)
- Channel 14
- Music 24 (Israeli music and video clips), available only via Yes (satellite TV) and Hot (cable TV), both pay TV systems
- Channel 9, in Russian, available only via Yes (satellite TV) and Hot (cable TV), both pay TV systems
- Israel Plus International, in Russian, export version of the local channel
- Hala TV (Israeli Arabic language channel), available only via Yes (satellite TV) and Hot (cable TV), both pay TV systems
- ILTV

== Most viewed channels ==
| Position | Channel | Share of total viewing (%) |
|---|---|---|
| 1 | Keshet 12 | 26.2 |
| 2 | Now 14 | 23.8 |
| 3 | Reshet 13 | 18.3 |
| 4 | Hot 3 | 4.1 |
| 5 | Kan 11 | 3.9 |
| 6 | Channel 9 | 3.5 |
| 7 | yes Drama | 3.3 |
| 8 | BBC Entertainment | 3.1 |
| 9 | Makan 33 | 2.0 |
| 10 | Keshet 12 News | 1.4 |

== See also ==
- Timeline of the introduction of television in countries
- Haim Yavin
- Mabat LaHadashot
- Media of Israel
- Nakdimon Rogel
- i24news
- List of television channels in Israel
- Israeli Television Academy Awards
