= Meimad TV Studios =

Meimad TV Studios (Hebrew: אולפני מימד) is an Israeli film and television production complex, founded in 1979. In 2020, it was acquired by Point 2 Point, who named its studio complex after Meimad. When it was independent, the company was owned by Ze'ev Mozes and Eitan Abbott, and administered by Yossi Strogo. Previously, the company produced programs for Channel 24 before it was reacquired by Telad, but also produced a variety of other television programs, including Nightclub, Good Evening with Guy Pines, War of the Sexes, programs for Arutz HaYeladim, and, in the past, most of Bip and Channel 20's productions.

== History ==
The company was formed in 1979 by Eitan Abbott and Leon Ziman. In 1989, comedian Dudu Topaz reached the studios to present a bedtime story program, where he told stories to a puppet named Gulu. The series was meant to air on Channel 1, but the studios received a more lucrative proposal from an experimental Channel 2. Other programs taped there, such as the satirical HaOlam HaErev, gave the channel a boost in ratings, especially with the Gulf War. In 1998, Eyan Kal and Zeev Moses' Tzena Communications acquired 50% of the company. The company was now part of the larger Meimad-HaAretz Group, which also included the HaAretz newspaper, Tnuva Communications, Delek Investments and Comutech. It bid for a third terrestrial channel in 2000, but without success (such channel would eventually become Channel 10).

In February 2001, it provided the playout to the Israeli version of Fox Kids.

In October 2008, it initiated an NIS 1,836 million lawsuit on Play TV, operator of the Israeli version of Playboy TV, under the grounds that the licensee refused to pass the payments to Meimad and even suggested ending the partnership. The decision came after Playboy Global reviewed the technical capacities of its Israeli affiliate, which was still relying on tapes instead of satellite delivery, as well as technical problems reported by HOT and Yes subscribers. By March 2009, it was providing services for Israeli-Ethiopian Television.

In August 2020, Point 2 Point acquired the company.
