= Idan+ =

Israeli digital terrestrial television provider

Idan+ (Hebrew: עידן+) is the provider of digital terrestrial television in Israel, operated by the Second Authority for Television and Radio.

The name "Idan" is derived from the initials of the Hebrew phrase "Accessible Digital Israeli Channels" (ערוצים ישראליים דיגיטליים נגישים)

== History ==
The Israeli government started working on a digital terrestrial service in 2004, with the aim of establishing a free-to-air alternative to Hot and Yes.

The Second Authority launched the service on 2 August 2009. Viewers had access to Channel 1, Channel 2, Channel 10, Channel 33 and the Knesset Channel. During the test period, the government began examining the signals in order to find issues with the platform. In June 2011, it was announced that Idan+ would increase its FTA offer from five channels to eighteen, with the hypothesis of including HD channels and radio stations. Plans to include theme channels in a subscription package were initially mooted, but the Ministry of Communications changed the conditions, meaning that any possible theme channel would be introduced as a free-to-air channel. The increase in channels was going to be phased: phase one would see the introduction of the SD channels Channel 9, Educational 23 and Channel 24), as well as radio stations and the HD feed of Channel 1. Designated cable channels for specific groups, such as the Arabic-language channel Hala TV, the heritage channel and the news channel, which were still mere concepts, would be added pending approval. The increase in the number of channels would increase competition between players in the free-to-air landscape. The move came when Israel was switching off analog television signals.

On 26 February 2017, Channel 9, Channel 24, Hala TV and Channel 1 HD were added to Idan+, bringing the total number of TV channels up to ten. This coincided with the start of full-time DVB-T2 broadcasts, on channel 28 in the south and channel 32 in the north. At the time, the number of users was of 230,000. The number was due to the low number of channels available and also included Cellcom TV subscribers. In May 2019, the new owners opted to voluntarily remove Channel 24 from the service, due to lack of affordable conditions. The Second Authority had no say on the decision.

Due to the onset of the Gaza war, Bibist channel Channel 14 (formerly Channel 20) was added to the platform, under the condition that the channel continues free-to-air until the end of the war. The channel paid two million shekels in carriage agreements. Channel 9, Hala TV and Channel 24 were also part of similar benefits.

In January 2025, broadcasts on the DVB-T standard shut down, moving entirely to DVB-T2. Elderly users with limited technological knowledge were the most affected. Some users also got to see six channels coming from a Palestinian digital terrestrial multiplex.

== Channels ==
- Kan 11
- Keshet 12
- Reshet 13
- Channel 14
- Makan 33
- Kan Educational
- Knesset Channel
