= Cramel =

Israeli children's book series

- Cramel; Cramel II - The Revenge; Cramel III - Riddle Boy; Cramel IV: The Golden Treasure; Cramel V: The Lost Diamond; Cramel VI: A Double Mystery; Cramel VII: Stomp in the Swamp; Cramel VIII: Mrs. Blum Rules; Cramel IX: Follow the Rubies
- Author: Meira Barnea-Goldberg
- Language: Hebrew
- Publisher: Kinneret Zmora-Bitan Dvir
- No. of books: 9

Cramel (Hebrew: כראמל) is an Israeli children's book series by Meira Barnea Goldberg, illustrated by Keren Mai Metcalfe (books 1–4) and Rami Tal (books 5-present). As of December 2022, the series has sold over 300,000 copies. In December 2023, the eighth book in the series called "Mrs. Blum Rules" was released.

== Premise ==
A woman named Mila adopts three orphans: Robbie (Robert), El El (Elliot) and Gol (Gabriel). One morning, they receive a mysterious package from their uncle Arthur Jerome who informs them that he has passed away and divided his inheritance into three gold rings. El El chooses the Ring of Happiness, which grants him Jerome's castle and all 500 of its servants. Gol chooses the Ring of Industry, which grants him both of his uncle's automotive factories. Robbie chooses the Nameless Ring and it grants him Arthur's cat, Cramel. Two of the rings have restrictions: El El must live with Mila and his brothers until Robbie turns 18 and Gol will only get the factories at 18. Nonetheless, Robbie receives no warnings or rules. When they move to the castle, they discover that the housemaster, Mrs. Blum and her daughter Helena live there and cannot be fired due to an intervention set up by Arthur many years ago. Robbie discovers that the cat, Cramel, can talk and hides his other abilities from Robbie, such as: mind reading, turning stone into gold, invisibility and more. Mrs. Bloom and Helena try to steal the three brothers' inheritance, focusing especially on the cat.

== Main characters ==
Cramel - A cat around whom most of the plot revolves. Cramel is a talking cat with various magical abilities, including telekinesis, mind reading (strictly of good-hearted people), turning stones into gold, and turning invisible, among others. He initially belongs to Robbie and later to Vish.

Robert "Robbie" Jerome - Cramel's owner and the youngest brother of Gol and El-El.

Eliot "El-El" Jerome - The eldest brother of Robbie and Gol, and the owner of Jerome Castle. He is vain, constantly obsessed with his hair, and is Helena's boyfriend.

Gabriel "Gol" Jerome - The middle brother of Robbie and El-El, and the owner of a car factory. Although considered very foolish, he is revealed to be a talented artist towards the end of the series.

Jane Bloom - A talkative girl who ran away from an orphanage. She is Mrs. Bloom's niece (the daughter of her sister, Margaret) and a close friend of Robbie.

Helena Bloom - Mrs. Bloom's adopted daughter (as revealed in the tenth book) and El-El's girlfriend. She is exceptionally beautiful. In the tenth book, it is revealed that her biological parents are a king and queen from the "Upside-Down World".

Vish Smith - Mila's nephew. A nine-year-old child prodigy who can communicate with lizards and eats only salted pasta. The character is based on Avishai, the autistic son of the series' author, Meira Barnea-Goldberg.

Mrs. Bloom - The primary antagonist of the first book, who also appears in subsequent entries. She seeks to obtain Cramel so he will turn stones into gold and make her wealthy. She is the adoptive mother of Helena and the aunt of Jane.

Mila Smith - The adoptive mother of El-El, Gol, and Robbie, and the aunt of Vish. She is married to Sep and is the mother of baby Oliver.

== Reception ==
Overall, the book received praise. Critics noted the resemblance to Roald Dahl's books and the feelings evoked by the story "with the scent of the past ... along with important lessons about true friendship, courage, self-belief and true love."

== Events ==
From August 8 to 26 2022, the Dizengoff Center hosted attractions promoting the Cramel book and TV series. The attraction was planned to take place despite the recent Gaza–Israel clashes. The attractions included: cat adoption, workshops with Cramel book illustrator Rami Tal, story time with actor and voice-actor Tomer Sharon, an activity and creative complex with activity booklets and riddles, Daily prize-bearing quizzes compiled by the author, and a cat themed cake-making contest.

== Adaptations ==
=== TV series ===
The books were adapted into a television series also titled "Cramel", with its first, second, and third seasons airing on Kan Educational with the first season releasing on January-February 2022. The second season aired during February-March 2023, the third in February-March 2024 and the fourth premiered in February 2025.

=== Comic book ===
A comic book adaptation of Cramel was published in June 2022 and was illustrated by Nadav Nachmani. It takes place when Cramel is still a kitten.

=== Musical ===
On Hanukkah, December 19, 2022, a musical inspired by the Cramel book series had its first showing at the Orna Porat Children's Theater and was released concurrently with the 7th book. It was written by Roi Segev and Shireli Desha and directed by the original author Meira Barnea Goldberg. The release was paired with an opportunity to get Barnea-Goldberg's signature and partake in a communal menorah lighting.

== Awards and nominations ==
In 2017, the second book in the series was selected as a candidate for the "Ha-pinkas" outstanding youth book award category.

In 2018, the book won the Devorah Omer Award in the field of Hebrew literary work for children as an outstanding book for youth.
