= Erev Hadash =

Israeli television series

Show's former logo

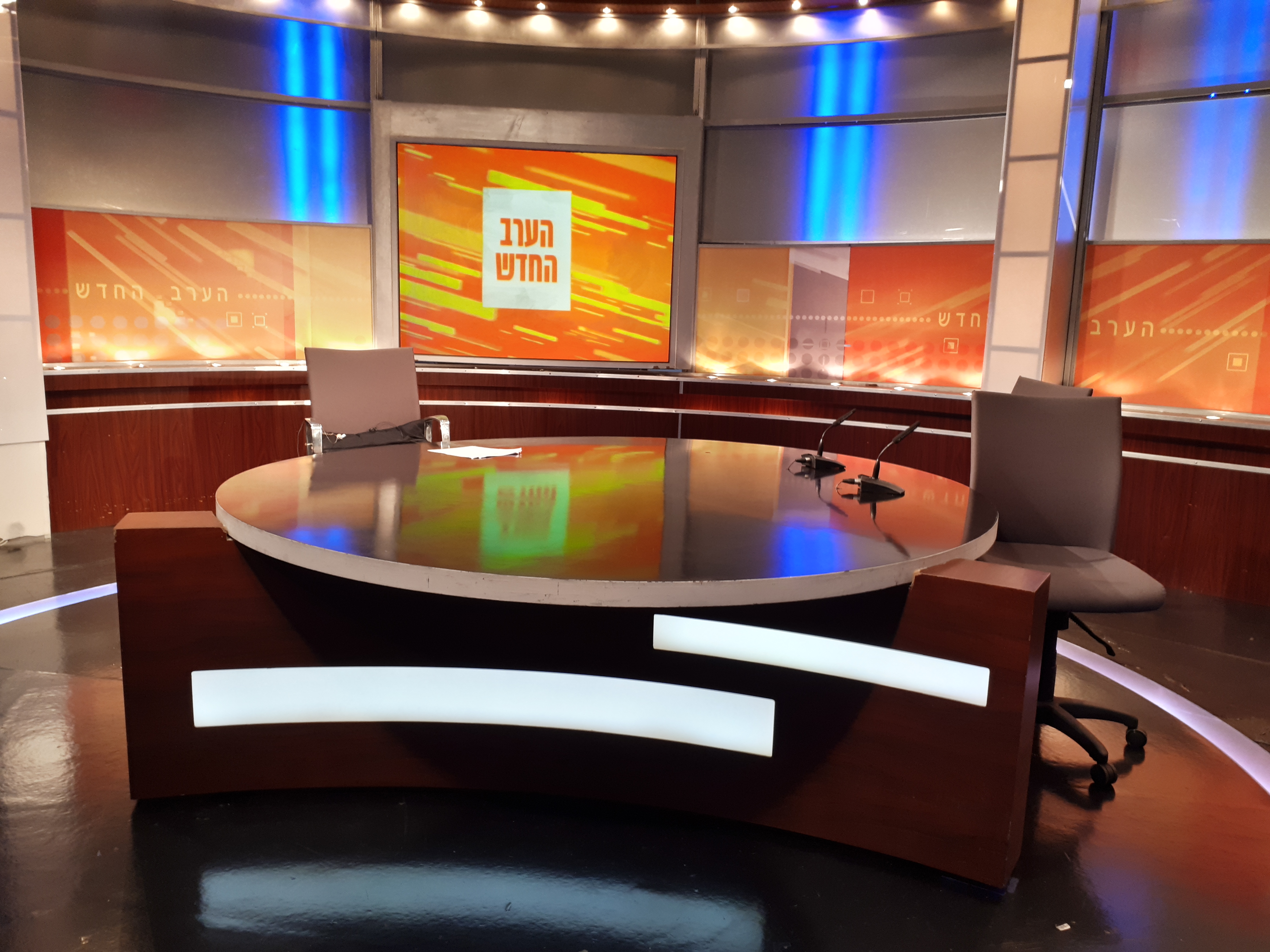
Television studio of the Erev Hadash show at the IETV building. April 2018

Erev Hadash (Hebrew: עֶרֶב חָדָשׁ, lit. The New Evening) was one of the most veteran and successful Israeli TV news programs produced by Israeli Educational Television (also known as Hinuchit), specially commissioned for Channel 1 (later KAN 11). The show was first aired on June 7, 1982, the second day of the 1982 Lebanon War, as a show of soldiers sending regards to their family from the front, and news flash, and it was originally during this period named Operation Peace for Galilee (Hebrew: מִבְצָע שְׁלוֹם הַגָּלִיל, read as Mivtsa Shlom HaGalil), the identical name of the operation of the war.

The show aired every day at 4:59 pm, the first round of pre-primetime news shows (which incorporates a short news update from Channel 1 at 5:00pm), and its regular host was the veteran and well-known Israeli Journalist, Dan Margalit.

The program ended its broadcasts after 36 years of broadcasting, ahead of the closure of the IET. The last edition, which was hosted by Dan Margalit, was broadcast on August 5, 2018.
