= HaOlam HaErev =

- העולם הערב
- Genre: Satire comedy Sketch comedy
- Created by: Erez Tal; Avri Gilad
- Directed by: Avi Cohen
- Starring: Avri Gilad, Erez Tal, Einav Galili, Sarit Sari, Mati Sari, Yair Nitzani
- Country of origin: Israel
- Original language: Hebrew

Production
- Production location: Meimad TV Studios
- Running time: 10 to 15 minutes
- Production companies: Doron Avrahami; England Israel Television Ltd. Meimad TV Studios

Original release
- Network: Channel 2 (experimental)
- Release: 4 November 1990 – March 1993

HaOlam HaErev (Hebrew: העולם הערב, romanized: HaOlam HaErev, lit. 'The World Tonight') is an Israeli satirical sketch comedy show that premiered on the experimental Channel 2 that existed before the commercial Channel 2 between 1990 and 1993, written and presented by Avri Gilad and Erez Tal. It was one of the most successful programs of the experimental channel, achieving success among the youth during its run, and since then, it has been considered a cult show.

== Production ==
Tal and Gilad had a similar program on Galatz from 1983 to 1987, Ma Yesh (Hebrew: מה יש, romanized: What's The Matter?). Avi Cohen, a friend of the two when they worked in London, suggested bringing the formula to television. At the apex of the radio program's popularity, some of its members worked at a program on Israeli Television (the only channel available at the time). In 1989, Gilad pitched the concept to IBA entertainment manager Hanoch Hasson, but Hasson reportedly could not understand his idea. In 1990, he heard of Doron Avrahami, who was bidding for Channel 2's commercial license, expected to begin in 1993. Until then, an experimental channel was set up. Precisely when the first bidding contract was being made, Avrahami signed a contract with Meimad TV Studios to produce a program, giving impulse to the idea. Gilad also noticed that other Israeli comedy shows, with the exception of Zehu Ze!, rejected his proposals. After several failed pilots with several ideas, the pilot for HaOlam HaErev was produced. If approved, Avrahami would pitch a full season of twenty fifteen-minute episodes. On the first filming day, three episodes were made.

The turning point came with the Gulf War. At the time, the show's popularity skyrocketed. One of the editions during the Gulf War lockdown involved a patriot atop a Scud missile. Since most Israelis were locked at home in that period, the war made the program relevant and ended up having around a hundred episodes in nearly three years. The first twenty episodes were made voluntarily by the team. After episode 21, the team received approximately US$100 per program, sometimes less. The program was largely financed through merchandise, but the team did not receive financial compensation.

== Reactions ==
Not everyone liked HaOlam HaErev in the initial 20-episode run. With the Gulf War, the negative trend was inverted and the caricature of Saddam Hussein became popular.

== Legacy ==
Channel 10 acquired footage of the series in March 2003, acquired from England Israel Television, and aired highlights of the series in a late night (11:30pm) slot for thirty minutes.

In 2007, Only in Israel (which aired on the successor to the experimental Channel 2) presented an eight-episode reunion special, for the fortieth anniversary of Israeli television. Tal created it in 1998.
