= Kishkashta =

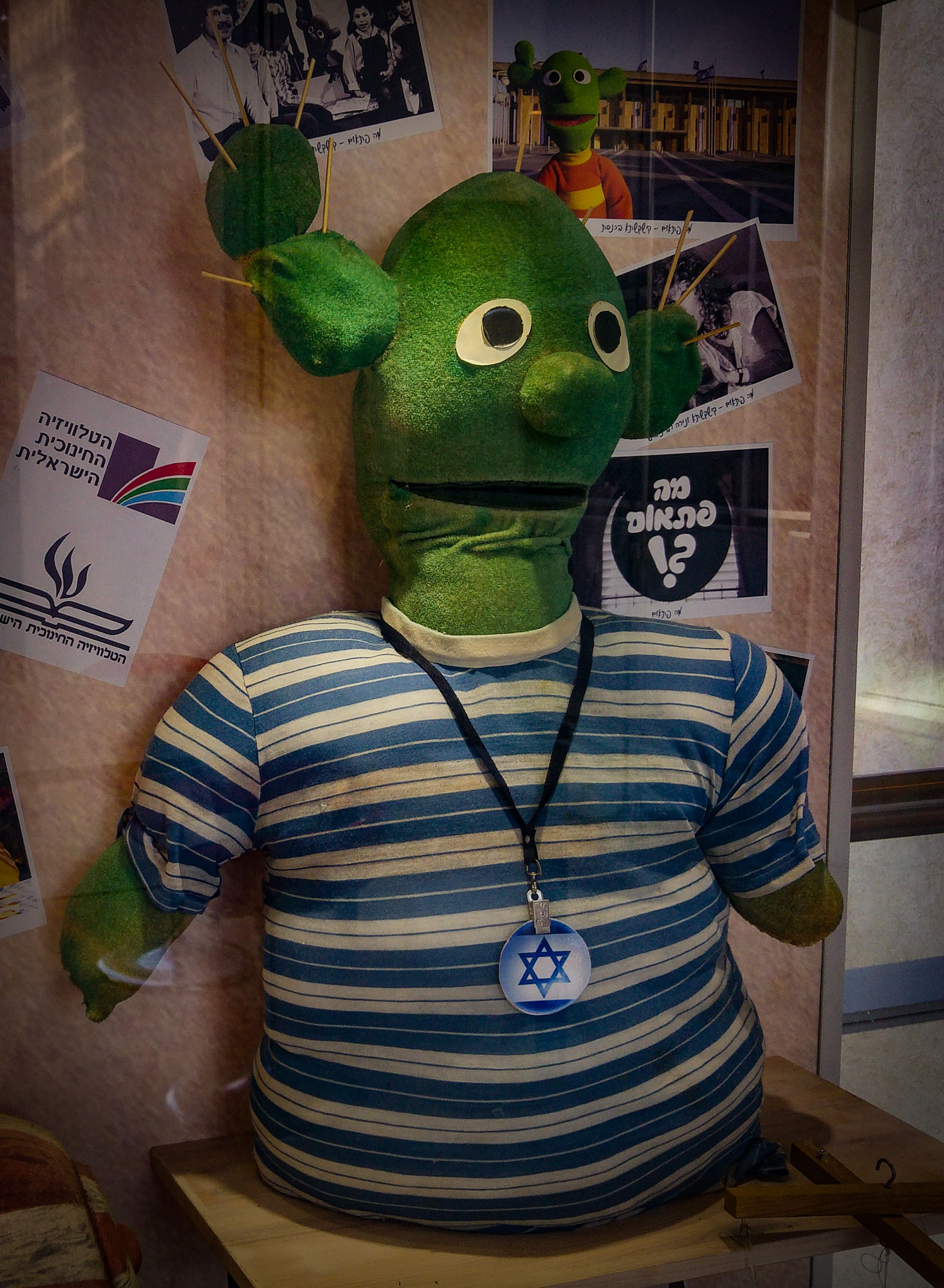
- Kishkashta
- Also known as: Ma Pit'om; What on earth?
- קישקשתא
- Country of origin: Israel
- Original language: Hebrew
- No. of episodes: 121

Production
- Running time: 30 minutes per episode

Original release
- Network: Israeli Educational Television
- Release: 1976 – 1981

Kishkashta (Hebrew: קישקשתא) was the main character in one of the first Israeli Educational Television shows, Ma Pit'om (מה פתאום; "What on earth?" or "No way!"), written by, among other screenwriters, Tamar Adar. The show aired in the 1970s and '80s, when there was only one television station in Israel, TV was still black and white, and there were only a few hours of television a day.

== History ==
Kishkashta was a talking cactus, a felt puppet equivalent to Big Bird, who introduced himself singing a solitary song, Ma Pit'om: "They call me 'Kishkashta,' Kishkashta is my name... I almost forgot: 'hello!' I sing and dance almost by myself - in the program Ma Pit'om:

קוראים לי קישקשתא....
קישקשתא זה שמי....
כמעט ושכחתי: שלום!
אני שר ורוקד לי כמעט בעצמי....
בתוכנית מה פתאום

The show consisted of Kishkashta asking questions of himself as well as of the Israeli children who were his co-hosts. Nira Rabinovitch, now involved in new age ideas in Israel, co-starred with Kishkashta in many of the show's episodes, and sang the song Ma Pit'om with Kishkashta in the opening act.

In Israel, the cactus is a symbol of Israeli-born Jews, called sabras ("prickly pear"), as opposed to those who immigrated later, even though the cactus itself is not a native plant. Kishkashta embodied the image of Israeli sabra identity, a character "rough from the outside but soft and sweet from the inside." He had a deep, melancholic voice and possessed an independent spirit exuding the dugri (straight) sabra character for which Israelis are known.

== Ma Pit'om lyrics (in Hebrew) ==
קוראים לי קישקשתא.... קישקשתא זה שמי.... כמעט ושכחתי: שלום! אני שר ורוקד לי כמעט בעצמי.... בתוכנית מה פתאום.... אני שר בעצמי ורוקד עם עצמי... ומספר סיפורים לבד.... מוחא גם כפיים - למי?.... לעצמי!.... והכל בעצמי!.... כמעט....... אני שר - מה פתאום?.... אני מוכשר? מה פתאום?.... והכל בעצמי....... מה פתאום? מה פתאום? מה פתאום?.... תשאלו מה פתאום הם קוראים לי קישקשתא:.... באמת, מה פתאום?.... מה פתאום

== See also ==
- Television in Israel
- Education in Israel
- Culture of Israel
