= Cramel (TV series) =

Israeli TV Show

- Genre: Fantasy, Comedy drama
- Created by: Shirli Desha, Roy Segev
- Based on: Cramel by Meira Barnea Goldberg
- Directed by: Roy Segev (רועי שגב)
- Starring: Yonatan Bar Or Omri Lekes (עומרי לקס); Lir Issa; Mai Kurtz (מאי קורץ); Efrat Boymwald; Lyrit Balaban; Yuval Segal; Udi Gottschalk; Lian Ben Yishai (ליאן בן ישי); Michal Korman (מיכל קורמן); Vered Avidan; Jonathan Avinoam (יונתן אבינועם); Hila Harush Anat Magen Shevo
- Country of origin: Israel
- Original language: Hebrew
- No. of seasons: 5
- No. of episodes: 81

Production
- Executive producers: Amit Stratiner (עמית סטרטינר), Idit Mistrial (עידית מיסטריאל)
- Producer: July-August Productions

Original release
- Network: Kan Educational

Cramel (Hebrew: כראמל) is an Israeli children and youth television series based on the successful book series Cramel by Meira Barnea Goldberg. The first season aired from January 2, 2022 to February 3, 2022 on the channel Kan Educational. The episodes reached 14 million views on YouTube until all content was made exclusive to the Kan Educational website. One of the show's cast members, Lir Issa (ליר עיסא), confirmed Cramel would return for a second season by revealing pictures from the new set on his Instagram account.

== Plot ==
Three orphaned brothers discover that they are the only heirs of a rich uncle, who bequeaths them individually a castle, a luxurious automotive factory and a mysterious cat named Cramel. When they arrive at the castle, they meet Sep, the caretaker of the castle.

== Characters ==
- Cramel (operated by Goni Paz, voiced by Amir Kariaf) – the cat that Robbie inherits. Cramel has the ability to speak, practice various forms of magic, imitate voices and turn stones into pure gold. Loves cheesecakes.
- Robbie (Robert) Jerome (Yonathan Bar Or) – the main protagonist, inherits Cramel the cat from his uncle Arthur Jerome.
- El-El (Elliot) Jerome (Omri Lex) – inherits Arthur Jerome's castle. Arrogant, looks after his hair at all costs and is in love with Helena. El-El has a talent for songwriting. In the 3rd season he establishes a school newspaper.
- Gol (Gabriel) Jerome (Lir Issa) – inherits Arthur Jerome's automotive factory, but is not very bright. Talented in knitting, nicknamed by the knitting teacher "an Elevation". Winner of the national knitting competition. In episode 8, Helena wears his ring. In episode 17, El-El reveals that Helena loves him.
- Helena Bloom (May Kurtz) – Mrs. Bloom's beautiful daughter and Jane's cousin, helps her mother obtain the castle, the factory and the cat before going astray. In love with El-El. In episode 16 she gets involved in a love triangle with El-El and Gol, and in episode 17 reveals to Gol that she loves El-El.
- Mila Smith (Efrat Boymwald) – the adoptive mother of El-El, Gol and Robbie, who later adopts Jane as well.
- Mrs. Mimi Bloom (Lyrit Balavan) – the castle's housekeeper. She has been prevented from being fired due to an event that occurred at the Purple Lake. She hates Cramel and tries to get ownership of the inheritance. She is ashamed of her first name and lies that her name is Alfonsina. At the end of the first season, she leaves the castle in exchange for the gold that Cramel conjured for her.
- Sep Graham (Yuval Segal) – Mila's childhood friend and love interest. He likes taking photos with his camera and performs maintenance work at the castle.
- Chang/John (Udi Gottschalk) – the castle cook, who makes Chinese food and initially pretended to be Chinese. His real name was John until he changed his ethnicity for real by means of a magical globe.
- Jane (Lian Ben Yishai) – a talkative girl who ran away from the Clara Hermanes orphanage. Mrs. Bloom's niece and Helena's cousin.
- Vish Smith (Nevo Kaminka) – Mila's genius nephew. Eats only pasta with salt. He also has a little notebook in which he writes about people who talk about his name.
- Barbara (Hila Harush) - Gol's best friend that was his secret admirer that brought him cookies, made him a statue, and sent him a message in a kite.
- Betty, Sophie, and Felix (Michal Korman (Betty)) - The workers of Jerome's Castle.
- Beatrice (Daria Rosen) - a girl who was cloned and kidnapped by professor De Vil. Her clone was still El-El's friend, but had a wicked job to steal Cramel. In season 3 episode 20, the real Beatrice shows a mirror to the clone to destroy her - as said by Dev Vil in episode 16 - and meets a famous actor named Maximillian Domingo.

== Overview ==
Series	Episodes	Originally released	
Series	Episodes	First released	Last released
1	21	2 January 2022	3 February 2022
2	20	5 February 2023	8 March 2023
3	20	18 February 2024	20 March 2024
4	20	9 February 2025	12 March 2025
5	20	22 February 2026	30 March 2026

== Awards ==
Year	Award	Category	Nominee(s)	Result
2022	Frogi's Picks of the Year Awards	Lead Actor in Children's Series	Yonatan Ben Or	Nominated
2022	Frogi's Picks of the Year Awards	Favorite Actress in a Children's Series	Hila Harosh	Nominated
2022	The 2nd Children and Youth Television Awards Competition	Drama Series	Cramel (Season 1)	Won
2022	The 2nd Children and Youth Television Awards Competition	Best Actor in a Drama Series	Yuval Segal	Won
2022	The 2nd Children and Youth Television Awards Competition	Best Actress in a Drama Series	Lirit Bilvan	Won
2022	The 2nd Children and Youth Television Awards Competition	Best Director in a Drama Series	Roy Segev	Nominated
2022	The 2nd Children and Youth Television Awards Competition	Best Screenplay in a Drama Series	Roy Segev, Shireli Desha	Won
2022	The 2nd Children and Youth Television Awards Competition	Best Shot	Binyamin Cherem	Won
2022	The 2nd Children and Youth Television Awards Competition	Best Art Direction	Ado Dolev	Won
2022	The 2nd Children and Youth Television Awards Competition	Best Casting	Moran Machiano	Nominated
2022	The 2nd Children and Youth Television Awards Competition	Best Makeup	Roitel Darom	Won
2022	The 2nd Children and Youth Television Awards Competition	Best Original Music	Ben Zeidman, Daniel Markovitch	Nominated
2022	The 2nd Children and Youth Television Awards Competition	Best Costume Design	Hava Levi Rozelesky	Won
