= Israeli Public Broadcasting Corporation =

Israeli public service broadcaster

Israeli Public Broadcasting Corporation תאגיד השידור הישראלי هيئة البث الإسرائيلي
- Current logo of IPBC/Kan IPBC/Makan logo in Arabic IPBC logo in English

- The corporation headquarters in Jerusalem
- Type: Broadcast radio and television
- Branding: Kan (Hebrew); Makan (Arabic)
- Country: Israel
- Availability: Worldwide
- Headquarters: Jerusalem
- Owner: Statutory (public) corporation
- Key people: CEO: Golan Yochpaz (2022-)
- Launch date: 15 May 2017; 9 years ago (television and radio)
- Official website: kan.org.il makan.org.il
- Replaced: Israel Broadcasting Authority

The Israeli Public Broadcasting Corporation (Note: IPBC; Hebrew: תַּאֲגִיד הַשִׁיְדּוּר הַיִשְׂרְאֵלִי, romanized: Taʾăḡid HaŠidûr HaYiśreʾēli, lit. 'Israeli Broadcasting Corporation'; Arabic: هَيْئَة اَلْبَثّ اَلْإِسْرَائِيلي, romanized: Hayʾat al-Baṯṯ al-Isrāʾīlī) is the national public broadcaster of Israel. It carries the blanket branding Kan in Hebrew (כאן, 'Here') and Makan in Arabic (مكان, 'A place'). Its news division, Kan News, (Note: Hebrew: כאן חדשות, romanized: Kān Ḥădāšôt; Arabic: مكان الاخبار, romanized: Makān al-ʾAḵbār) is the third biggest brand in Israeli newscasting, after HaHadashot 12 and Channel 13 News.

After multiple delays due to disagreements over its structure raised by Prime Minister Benjamin Netanyahu, the IPBC officially began its radio and television operations on 15 May 2017, succeeding the Israel Broadcasting Authority (IBA) as state broadcaster. Its formal goals include promoting expanding knowledge, Israeli culture, and innovation in broadcasting.

== History ==
=== IBA closure ===
The Israel Broadcasting Authority (IBA) had deteriorated in status and function. Public committees found that the deterioration stemmed from a number of factors, including its large number of employees, high salary costs, rigid wage agreements, and the law governing it. The authors of the reports recommended structural changes to the authority and the law.

In July 2013, Minister of Communications Gilad Erdan hired an external consulting firm to examine the future of the IBA. In light of the data, the Landes Committee was established and published its decisions at the beginning of March 2014. According to the agreements reached, the television fee would be cancelled on 1 April 2015, and a new broadcasting entity would be established to replace the IBA.

=== Legislation ===
To formulate the necessary legislation, the Knesset set up a committee (headed by MK Karin Elharar) to discuss the public-broadcasting bill. The committee began its deliberations on 11 June 2014, and quickly conducted a number of meetings to allow the completion of the legislative process by the end of the Knesset session in July. On 9 July, a bill was approved and passed to the Knesset for a second and third reading. The Public Broadcasting Law, which ordered the establishment of the Israeli Broadcasting Corporation and the closure of the Broadcasting Authority, was passed on 29 July 2014. According to the new law, one quarter of the employees of the new body would come from the IBA and educational television.

Section 7 of the law describes the corporation's activity:

- (A) The Israeli Broadcasting Corporation will broadcast and provide various types of content visually, audio and written, on TV, on radio and on the Internet.
- (B) The content provided by the Israel Broadcasting Corporation shall be independent and directed to all citizens and residents of the State of Israel, shall reflect and document the State of Israel as a Jewish and democratic state, its values and the heritage of Israel and give fair, equal and balanced expression to the diversity of views and opinions prevalent in the Israeli public.
- (C) The Israeli Broadcasting Corporation shall provide news content and content in day-to-day matters in a professional, fair, responsible, independent, critical, impartial and reliable manner, with transparency and with the exercise of journalistic judgment and loyalty to the truth and the obligation to report to the public.
- (D) The Israeli Broadcasting Corporation will provide diverse content for children and youth, and will promote the creation of educational content for children and youth.
- (E) The Israeli Broadcasting Corporation shall provide content addressing the diversity of populations in Israeli society, including broadcasts in the Hebrew language, broadcasts in Arabic to the Arab population in Israel, and broadcasts in other languages prevalent in Israeli society.

In the fulfilment of its functions (as stated in this section), the Israeli Broadcasting Corporation will act:

1. to expand education and knowledge;
2. to promote culture, the original Israeli quality work, and Israeli music;
3. to promote innovation in the fields of broadcast content and distribution and broadcasting technologies.

=== Recruitment and appointments ===
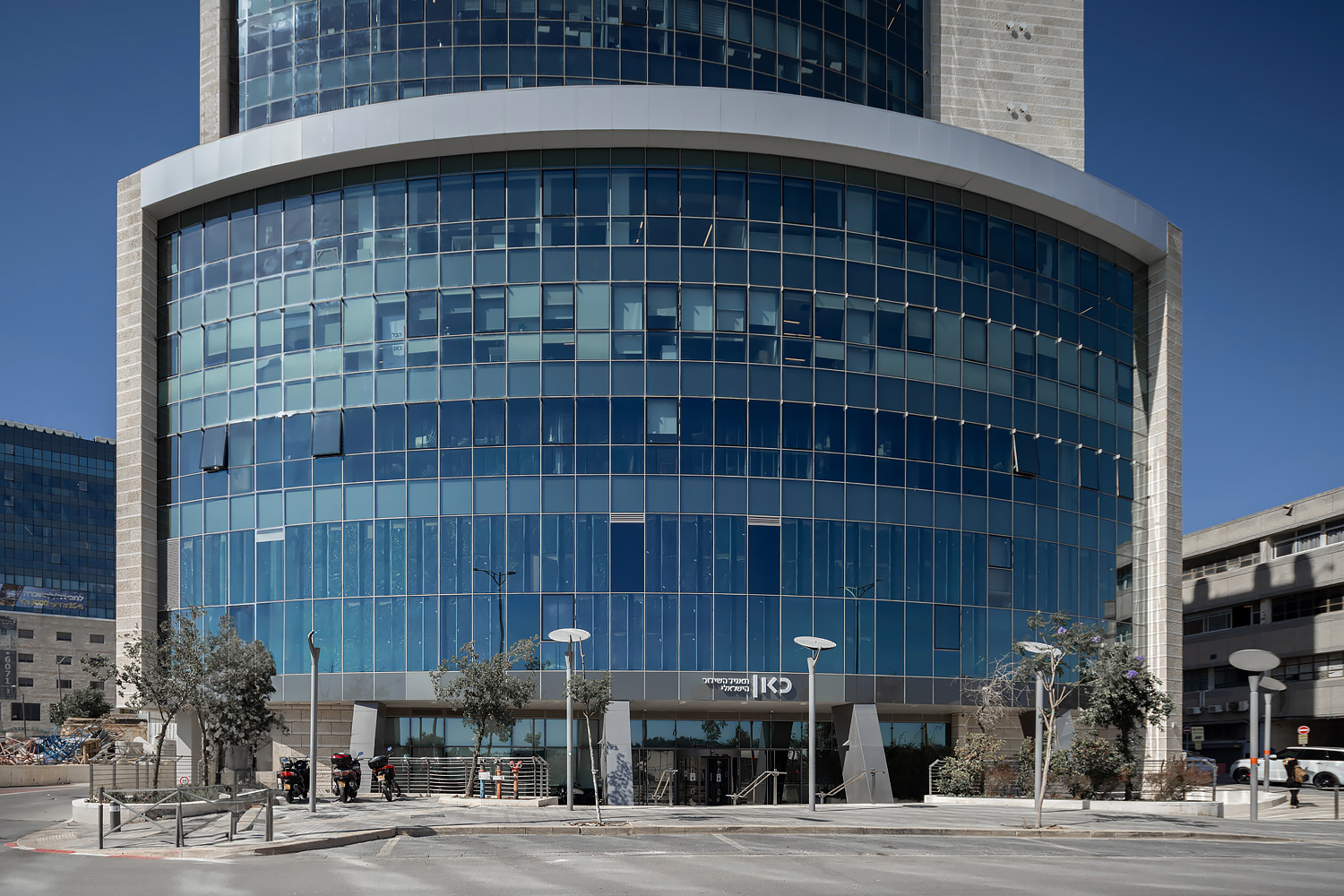
The corporation's main building in Jerusalem, pictured in June 2023

In September 2014, the Israeli Public Broadcasting Corporation began operations. Eldad Koblenz was appointed head of the corporation in March 2015. The chairman of the board of directors is Gil Omer. On 7 June 2016, Shlomi Abrhm Globrzon was appointed director of the news department. By November 2016, about 600 employees were recruited to the company (mainly managers, finance and technology). The manpower budget allocated for recruitment enabled the recruitment of 912 employees.

=== Delays ===
In July 2016, Israeli prime minister and communications minister Benjamin Netanyahu and Histadrut chairman Avi Nissenkorn agreed to postpone the dissolution of the IBA until early 2018.

In an additional agreement between Netanyahu and Finance Minister Moshe Kahlon, it was decided to postpone the launch of the new corporation until 30 April 2017, unless it announced that it was ready to broadcast on 1 January 2017. In December 2016, Netanyahu and Kahlon agreed that the corporation would begin broadcasting on 30 April 2017.

In March 2017, Netanyahu worked to close the IBA in the face of Kahlon's opposition. They reached a compromise in which the new corporation was postponed to 15 May, and the news division would operate as a separate corporation. On 11 May, the Knesset approved the split of the news division; however, on 14 May, the High Court of Justice issued a temporary injunction, delaying the split.

=== Budget ===
The corporation's construction budget was ₪350 million (US$98.1 million): ₪120 million ($33.6 million) for professional equipment, ₪28 million ($7.8 million) for labor, ₪14 million ($3.9 million) for operations, ₪128 million ($35.8 million) for real estate and $60 million for content acquisition.

=== European Broadcasting Union status ===
Since the IPBC's launch date was scheduled for 30 April 2017, the Eurovision Song Contest 2017 was scheduled for broadcast on IPBC's Kan 11. The launch date was postponed in mid-April to 15 May, and the contest was broadcast by the IBA (its last television production and broadcast).

The IPBC subsequently applied for European Broadcasting Union membership, succeeding the IBA, and went under review by the EBU's governing bodies and awaiting approval at its General Assembly. On 6 July 2017, it was announced that an agreement had been signed between the EBU and the IPBC to allow the corporation to participate in EBU events (such as the Eurovision Song Contest) without full membership.

Israel won the Eurovision Song Contest 2018, and therefore earned the right to host the 2019 edition, which eventually took place in Tel Aviv. However, the EBU warned that the pending plan to make the IPBC's news department a separate broadcaster (leaving the IPBC responsible for entertainment programming only) conflicted with rules requiring member broadcasters to handle both news and entertainment programming. On 18 June 2018, as a High Court decision on the split approached, Netanyahu stated that the government would comply with EBU rules to protect Israel's hosting of the Eurovision Song Contest. On 7 December 2018, the EBU General Assembly voted unanimously to approve the IPBC's membership application.

== Television ==
Since 15 May 2017, the IPBC broadcasts two television channels on national DVB-T2 transmitters, satellite feed, the HOT cable company, the YES satellite company, smaller pay-TV providers (such as Cellcom TV and Partner TV) and a free 24/7 livestream on the Internet. In 2018, Kan introduced a 4K resolution broadcast on Channel 511 (which was only used for broadcasts of the FIFA World Cup).

Kan's TV channels are:

- Kan 11: The corporation's main channel, replacing the IBA's Channel 1 and primarily broadcasting news, current affairs and cultural programs
- Makan 33: The Arabic-language channel, broadcasting news and cultural programs and replacing the IBA's Channel 33
- Kan Educational: On 15 August 2018, Channel 23 (known as Hinuchit or Israeli Educational Television) was replaced by a youth channel.

The broadcaster also operates the video on demand service Kan Box which it first released in 2022. The service features programming from the IPBC's Kan and Makan-branded television and radio stations along with shows produced for the IBA. It received a significant update in January 2026.

== Radio ==
Kan operates eight radio stations, transferred from the IBA which are broadcast on FM (frequencies differ by region and can be switched with RDS), as DVB-T2 broadcast on Idan+ (multiplex channels 28 (530 MHz) in the center, and 32 (562 MHz) in the north and in the south), and on Eutelsat E8WB East Beam satellite. Streams and on-demand programming are available via Kan's website. Some programs have podcasts. Kan also operates a podcast network called Kan Hesketim (Kan Podcasts), formerly called Kan Od (Kan More).

Kan Radio broadcast channels
Name	Logo	Content	Language	Frequencies, MHz	Website
Kan Bet		News, current affairs and sports	Hebrew	94.5, 95.0, 95.2, 95.5	
Kan 88		Jazz, blues, electronic music and traffic reports	Hebrew	87.6, 88.0, 88.2, 88.5	
Kan Gimel		Israeli music, news at the top of most hours	Hebrew	89.7, 97.5, 97.8, 105.5	
Kan Tarbut (Culture)		Talk and cultural programming	Hebrew	104.7, 104.9, 105.1, 105.3	
Kan Moreshet (Heritage)		Religious broadcasting	Hebrew	90.5, 90.8, 92.5, 100.7	
Kan Kol Hamusica (The Voice of Music)		Classical music and drama, with hourly news	Hebrew	91.3, 97.2, 98.5, 103.7	
Kan Reka (acronym for Aliyah Absorption Network)		Broadcasting to immigrants in their native languages	Amharic, English, Bukharian, Yiddish, Ladino, Spanish, French, Russian, Farsi	100.3, 100.5, 101.3, 101.8	
Makan ("Here" in Arabic)		News and cultural content in Arabic	Arabic	88.8, 92.3, 93.7, 99.3	

Former stations:

Kan Farsi logo

- Kol Yisrael
- VoisFarsi, formerly Reshet Hei and Kan Farsi – Persian-language station with Persian music and on-demand Farsi news programs.

Seven web-radio channels are dedicated to specific musical genres:

- Kan Nostalgia – Nostalgic Israeli music
- Kan Yam Tichon (Kan Mediterranean Sea) – Middle Eastern style Israeli music
- Kan Si Haregesh (Kan Peak of Emotion)
- Kan Ktzat Acheret (Kan Something Different)
- Kan 80's-90's
- Kan Lahitim (Kan Hits)
- Kan Klasi (Kan Classical)
- Kan Tel Aviv 2019 – Music from the Eurovision Song Contest and beyond. Ceased operating after the Eurovision 2019 final.

== Management ==
=== Board ===
The corporation's 12-member public board determines corporate policy, including overall broadcasting policy, approval of broadcasting schedules and budgets, appointment of the general manager, supervision of management and implementation of policy. The board is also responsible for approving the corporation's organisational structure, employment policy, personnel records, and discussing (and approving) its budget and the CEO's annual work plan.

The appointment of board members is the responsibility of the Minister of Communications. Although board members have a four-year term, the Minister of Communications may (at the recommendation of the Search Committee) allow a member to serve one additional term. The board includes at least six women and at least one Arab member, including the Druze and Circassian populations. On 13 and 16 April 2016, the Minister of Communications and Prime Minister Benjamin Netanyahu approved the members of the board (headed by Gil Omer) on the recommendation of the search committee headed by Justice Ezra Kama.

=== General manager ===
The corporation's CEO is appointed to its board of directors. A search committee headed by Judge Ezra Kama, former vice president of the Jerusalem District Court, was formed. The CEO is appointed for a four-year term, which may be extended for another term. Their duties include routine management, being the chief editor of broadcasts, scheduled transmissions, and submitting budget proposals and annual work plans. The CEO represents the corporation, signs documents and transactions, and hires employees.

The corporation appointed a temporary general manager, Eldad Koblenz, for up to two years after the start of broadcasting concurrently with the appointment of the CEO. The temporary general manager established the infrastructure required for corporate activity until broadcasting began.

=== News division ===
The news division provides content to the corporation's digital, television and radio stations, which also appears on the corporation's website and on Facebook page. A budget of ₪160 million was allocated for the division's establishment (compared to a budget of ₪90 million for each of the commercial news companies), with original plans to employ 450 journalists, photographers and production personnel.

=== Digital division ===
During the establishment of the corporation, it did not have broadcast radio and television channels because the IBA was still in operation. Content consumption in general, and news in particular, was consumed through digital platforms such as VOD, the internet, and mobile phones. The Internet was the IPBC's first distribution channel, in mid-2016.

The digital division has two divisions: a Content Creation Division responsible for content adapted to social networks, and a Products Division responsible for building and operating the digital platforms.

Services provided by the digital division include:

- Website – Contains content articles, videos, digital radio stations and administrative information.
- Mobile app – Android app
- Radio stations – A number of 24/7 digital radio stations, available on the website and with the Android app
- Podcasts
- 2016 Summer Olympics
- Economic game – Presents the state budget.
- Content on social networks

== See also ==
- Media of Israel
- Kan 7.10.360
