= Kan 7.10.360 =

Kan 7.10.360 (Hebrew: כאן 7.10.360) is an interactive virtual museum dedicated to the commemoration and illustration of the events of the October 7 attacks. It was launched in May 2024 by the Israeli Public Broadcasting Corporation ahead of Yom HaZikaron.

== Background ==
On the morning of October 7, 2023, Hamas and Palestinian Islamic Jihad militants launched a surprise attack on Israel. Under the cover of thousands of rocket launches, approximately 3,000 militants infiltrated dozens of Israeli communities and military installations in and around the Gaza envelope, engaging in firefights against the few security forces present. The attacks resulted in the deaths of 1,195 people, of whom 736 were civilians, while 251 people were kidnapped into the Gaza Strip. In the initial hours, response units, Israeli police officers, Yamam fighters, and IDF soldiers fought against the militants despite being outnumbered. About 1,550 militants were killed on Israeli soil during the battles, while the Israeli side lost 301 soldiers, 55 police officers, and 10 Shin Bet agents.

In response to the massacres, the Israeli Public Broadcasting Corporation initiated the creation of the 7.10.360 Museum to document and commemorate the events of the attack.

== Content and features ==
The museum allows visitors to virtually tour the Gaza envelope communities. Through an application, visitors can view documentation of the events and aftermath of the October 7 attacks. Visitors can also hear first-hand accounts from residents and security personnel.

The museum utilizes thousands of hours of raw materials collected in the broadcaster's archives since the outbreak of the war, including reports, films, interviews, and podcasts. Additionally, previously unpublished video clips, security footage, recordings, and correspondences were incorporated, gathered through research conducted by the broadcaster's team in collaboration with southern communities and settlements. In the months following the museum's launch, additional archival footage and data are expected to be added, providing a foundation for future research and education about the massacre. The technical management of the museum is handled by Diskin Company, which developed the virtual museum of the Auschwitz concentration camp.
