= Channel 2 (Israel, 1986–1993) =

Defunct Israeli television channel

- Country: Israel
- Broadcast area: National
- Headquarters: Jerusalem

Programming
- Language: Hebrew
- Picture format: 4:3 SDTV

Ownership
- Owner: The Second Authority for Television and Radio

History
- Launched: 23 October 1986
- Closed: 3 November 1993
- Replaced by: Channel 2

Channel 2, frequently known in Hebrew as Experimental Channel 2 (Hebrew: ערוץ 2 הניסיוני, romanized: Arutz Shtaim Hanisyoni), was a seven-year Israeli experiment to study the feasibility of a commercial television channel. It started doing broadcasts funded through a television licence tax on 23 October 1986. Initially, the broadcasts were expected to run over a limited period, until the licenses for the regular second channel were set up. However, legislative hurdles extended the process by several years, and the channel, still experimental, increased its schedule.

The first transmissions were aired on UHF channel 21 from Mount Eitanim transmission tower situated on the hills west of Jerusalem. These transmissions, which initially included 2–3 hours of video clips every evening originating from a private TV studio in Jerusalem, expanded gradually to include a full program lineup. At that time the IBA was legally responsible for the channel, but it actually saw it as unexpected competition, tried to prevent its inauguration, and was reluctant to take responsibility for its broadcasts. Moreover, there was opposition, before and in the early stages of its run, from certain political parties, including those that were in ruling coalitions.

For a brief period, it provided a basic television service to Israel when Channel 1 could not provide its regular services due to a weeks-long strike in 1987. Later, it was given new impulse thanks to the Gulf War and the success of one of its programs, the satirical The World Tonight. It finally closed on 3 November 1993, giving way for a regular Channel 2 the following day, under the auspices of the Second Authority for Television and Radio.

== Background ==
Discussions regarding the operation of a second channel started nearly three years after the launch of Israeli Television, owned by the Israeli Broadcasting Authority. This happened due to the expansion of its daily airtime (in its first two years, the channel only broadcast four days a week, for a few hours) and due to the fact that the only channel timeshared with Israeli Educational Television during mornings and afternoons, and with Arabic broadcasts in the early evening. In March 1971, Minister of Education and Culture Yigal Allon (who was in charge of the IBA) ordered the acceleration of preparations for the second channel, with the goal of being a separate operation from "General Television" (as the IBA channel was frequently called back then), but prime minister Golda Meir rejected the proposal. In December 1972, president of the IBA executive committee Walter Eitan proposed that the second channel should be financed by advertising. However, at the time, it was a long-term plan, since the programming back then lasted for five hours a day. The idea of airing commercials caused objections under the allegations that it would give an incentive to unnecessary consumption. Newspaper owners in Israel also opposed to the measure under fear of damaging their income.

In June 1973, BBC Director-General Hugh Greene was invited to visit Israel to prepare a report on the structure and operations of the IBA, and recommended the opening of a second channel financed by advertising. In June 1974, IBA Director-General Yitzhak Livni declared that there was a need for a second channel, in colour (at the time, Israeli television was still in black and white) and that would include commercial advertising; but the designated minister, Aharon Yadlin, rejected the idea.

The question for the creation of a second channel gained impulse after political turbulence in the elections for the Ninth Knesset and the rise of Likud to power in 1977. Several sectors started pressuring the government to approve the creation of a second channel from the private sector, despite opposition from the responsible minister, Zevulun Hammer. In July 1978, the government created a committee to examine the question, led by Haim Kovarsky. The IBA directive supported the creation of a second public channel, whereas the Israeli Advertisers' Association (now Israeli Marketing Association) supported the creation of a second commercial channel. Cinema owners opposed its creation. The committee recommended the creation of a second channel that would not be under the supervision of the IBA, under the supervision of a separate authority, and that would be financed by advertising. The recommendations were archived due to the opposition from the National Religious Party (NRP), which was part of the ruling coalition of the time, and known for its rejection for commercial television.

== Establishment ==
In late 1984, Minister of Communications Amnon Rubinstein, shortly after taking office, decided to promote the idea of a second television channel. He founded an administration for its creation, led by Avraham Porez and Oren Toktali, who dedicated himself to elaborate a law project to establish a channel based on the British ITV network, using a franchise system partitioned on days of the week. In late 1985, the law draft was ready and the legislative process began. In the summer of 1986, seven teams began organizing to compete for the licenses. In September, the government approved the law draft and submitted to the Knesset for approval, despite opposition from IBA Director-General Uri Porat. The law was approved in a first reading at the Knesset on 1 December.

On 7 October 1986, Channel 2's directive started experimental transmissions, which included presentations of slides designated for the UHF channel reserved, channel 22. At the same time, a strike erupted on Channel 1, which interrupted its programming for two days. The official explanation from the Ministry of Communications for its broadcasts was because it was a reception test and that depended on viewer reactions from across the country; moreover, unless these transmissions had started, the frequencies would have been used by TV networks in neighbouring countries. The test was held by Bezeq for the Ministry of Communications, using the existing television transmitter at Mount Eitanim, in the hills of Jerusalem. Experimental Channel 2 broadcasts began in earnest on 18 December 1986. In its early months, broadcasts lasted for two hours an evening, from 7pm to 9pm, and included music videos and informative material on how to receive its broadcasts. In February 1987, broadcasts were extended by an hour to 10pm.

In March 1987, the Demjanjuk trials were shown on Channel 2. After IETV recorded the entirety of the trials, but had no airtime to carry it live, minister Rubinstein gave the greenlight for airing it on the new channel. After the collaboration, Channel 2 increased its airtime to carry its programs throughout the day, starting with mornings, during the test period. On Independence Day 1987, the channel held its first ten-hour transmission, which also included a live studio broadcast, another first. This production infuriated the IBA, which appealed to the Attorney General and demanded the suspension of the experimental broadcasts, which were deemed illegal. The Attorney General approved its continuation, but put it under conditions under IBA supervision, since the Knesset did not approve the Law for the Second Authority for Television and Radio, and, according to legislation of the time, the IBA was the only authorized organ to supervise transmissions. After a decision from the Attorney General, Channel 2 was obliged to air only repeats of programs already seen on Channel 1. It was forbidden from producing original programs, including talk shows, magazines and newscasts. Uri Shinar, who at the time was the channel's content manager, was forced to look at the IBA archives for abandoned series that still had rerun rights and assemble a schedule based on them. The excerpts inserted in the schedule incentivised recording companies to produce further clips.

For Rosh Hashanah 1987, it planned a special original broadcast named Flower in the Darkness, combining filmed greetings from soldiers in the northern front, the presence of artists in a studio and the airing of music videos, but the IBA rejected its broadcast. The program was only broadcast later thanks to the request of the family of one of the soldiers to watch footage of said family's son, who died during filming.

== Increase in programming ==
In October 1987, a new trike broke out at the IBA, which resulted in the suspension of Channel 1's afternoon and evening transmissions for 52 days. During the strike, Channel 2, still in experimental format, received a government permit to increase its airtime, airing films and acquired programs. When the IBA strike extended, experimental Channel 2 received a permit to broadcast on IBA's frequencies, which was understood by the staff on strike as an attempt from the government to break the strike.

During the strike, refusenik Ida Nodel arrived to Israel, constituting a large-scale event that, due to the strike, had no news coverage available. Channel 2 took advantage of it, obtained a permit from the prime minister's cabinet and initiated the first live broadcast of the event. The broadcast of the welcoming ceremony was held with precarious equipment and limited technical conditions, presenting some problems and technical difficulties, which generated criticism in the media. However, the channel considered it to be a key milestone. With the end of the strike, IBA ceased cooperation with experimental Channel 2, but its broadcasts were not interrupted.

In 1988, legislative procedures for the Second Channel Law were interrupted, after Amnon Rubinstein quit from the government in June 1987, due to opposition from several parties to the creation of the channel. Meanwhile, the establishing administration continued test transmissions during the evening, with a limited budget supplied by the Ministry of Communications and a team of eight staff operating in three rooms at the Clal Center building in Jerusalem. The channel established partnerships with companies that recognized the potential of broadcasting and thus produced content for free. The channel started airing original productions, some of which were of limited interest, but others achieved high popularity. In 1988, Meirav Ofir (an announcer at Galatz) became its continuity announcer. It expanded its activities and signed an agreement to air matches of the Israeli basketball league. It also aired a British cartoon, The Pondles. That same year, Tokatli renounced as CEO and was replaced by Nissim Mashal. Mashal initiated live broadcasts from the Knesset plenary and found approval for the channel to air public service announcements and commercial sponsorships to help finance it. Mashal also hired veteran Channel 1 journalist Micha Limor as an announcer, presenter and master of ceremonies of the live Knesset broadcasts, and with the outbreak of the Gulf War in February 1991, he was named as the editor of the channel's experimental news programs, Morning in the Gulf (הבוקר במפרץ) and Tonight in the Gulf (הערב במפרץ), broadcast from Herzliya Studios. Limor hired an editorial team that included Aharon Barnea, Nitzan Horowitz, Oshrat Kotler, Orly Yaniv and several other reporter-editors that would later become renowned. Tonight in the Gulf and the Knesset transmissions received enthusiastic criticism in the written press of the time. In 1992, Nissim Mashaal decided to lead a group in the bidding for the commercial Channel 2 that would replace it, and Macha Limor was nominated in his place by the Minister of Communications, Roni Milo, as the director for the experimental Channel 2, a post he occupied until the start of commercial broadcasts.

That same year, the Knesset approved the Law for the Second Authority for Television and Radio, this putting an official end to IBA's supervision over the second channel and turning it an independent service. Despite the creation of the Second Authority, its transmissions were still considered experimental, since the commercial companies that would receive the licenses to operate its regular transmissions had not yet been selected. The selection process was long, lasting nearly three years. Even more production companies and creators showed interest and were given the opportunity of trying experimental broadcasts and creating content on their own will, hoping to win a bid and join commercial broadcasting in the future. During this transitional period, the channel started formulating an organized schedule with programs on several subjects. Some of the programs still had a non-conventional or vanguardist character. Popular programs during this period included the comedy show The World Tonight (העולם הערב), presented by Erez Tal and Avri Gilad, and a talk show, Dan Shilon Live (בשידור חי עם דן שילון).

== Gulf War, closure and replacement by the commercial Channel 2 ==
The channel gained a larger impulse in 1991 with the beginning of the First Gulf War, which led to a continuous 18-hour transmission, instead of the previous five hours a day. To fill its schedule, Uri Shinar acquired low-cost content from foreign companies which agreed to help Israel during the war. It also started airing a daily selection of news items from foreign television channels (since, at the time, the channel had no permit to produce its own news programs) as a morning recap (Morning in the Gulf) and an evening summary (Tonight in the Gulf). The war also had a decisive impact on The World Tonight, the only program to predict (in a comical way) that missiles would fall over Israel, when the predictions were different. Humorous, real-time references to the war contributed to the success of the program among young viewers.

At the end of the war, the channel proved its importance when citizens entered with a petition at the Supreme Court of Justice demanding the operation of a national transmitter network. Many original programs were added to its schedule, such as Nice Guy and Smart at Night, becoming an important player in the Israeli media landscape. In 1993, with the announcement of the licenses for commercial broadcasts, the production companies were engaged in preparing for them, and the experimental channel reduced the variety of programs and slashed its airtime. When the experimental broadcasts ended on 31 October 1993, Ron Levintel presented a farewell program which summarized seven years of experimental broadcasts and remembrered milestones and key moments from its history. On 1–3 November, it mostly aired promos for the new schedule, as well as a final farewell broadcast on 3 November, where channel director Macha Limor passed the baton to the Channel 2 licensees (Keshet, Reshet, Telad) in a symbolic act from a studio in Givatayim. On 4 November, the Second Authority's commercial Channel 2 started broadcasting.

== Programming ==
=== News and current affairs ===
- Morning in the Gulf: Morning recap during the Gulf War
- Evening in the Gulf: Evening recap during the Gulf War, presented by Macha Limor
- World at 7:30 (שבע וחצי בעולם): Replacement of Evening in the Gulf, a general world news program.
- At 8 (שמונה בערב): Analysis of the day's events

=== Talk shows ===
- Dan Shilon Live (בשידור חי – דן שילון מארח): Dan Shilon interviewed politicians, artists, and, sometimes unusual personalities that weren't celebrities. Unlike other talk shows, where it was common to interview guests one by one, the guests in this program were sitting in a circle, similar to an Israeli living room. The program would last until 2000 surviving the creation of the commercial second channel in 1993, becoming one of the few survivors of the experimental phase
- Wise at Night (חכם בלילה): talk show presented by Ron Levintel and produced at Geva Studios in Givatayim. It was notorious for being the stage of Dana International's first television appearance still under the name Yaron Cohen, on 1 November 1992.

=== Comedy and entertainment ===
- The World Tonight: Nonsense sketch show written and presented by Erez Tal and Avi Gilad.
- Nice Guy: Written and presented by Guy Maroz and drama writer Yoni Lahav.
- Kabbalat Shabbat: Comedy sketch show akin to The Closed Wing and with a similar cast.
- Fisfusim Plus: Original version of the later Fisfusim hidden camera show.
- 1992 Purim and Independence Day specials: featuring the troupe that would go on to become HaHamishiya HaKamerit.
- Lama Mi: A game show hosted by Asaf Gil.

=== Music ===
- Name That Music Video: An interactive program featuring edited music videos that viewers had to identify.
- Music Now: Music magazine show hosted by Ilan Ben-Shahar, featuring an overview of the latest music from Israel and abroad, showings of music videos, and viewer competitions (such as a record-collecting contest in a store). The show was originally titled Dance Party.
- The Sound of Pop (1991–1992) and The Sound of Rock (1992–1993): Themed music magazines show hosted by Yoav Kutner.

=== Lifestyle and magazine ===
- Channel 2’s Recipe Corner
- Cake for Shabbat: Cooking show presented by Tami Sirkis.
- Allow Me to Introduce: Hanan Goldblatt introduces guests.
- Midway: Travel with Dudu Dotan.
- Behind Closed Doors: Interviews and on-location reports with Billy Moskona-Lerman.
- Name of the Game (1990–1991): A weekly sports magazine with Yoram Arbel, Orly Yaniv, and Mordechai Spiegler.

=== Children's programming ===
- Dudu Tells Stories to Gulu (1989–1990): Dudu Topaz reads bedtime stories to Gulu, a male puppet, voiced by Irit Shilo. The show was produced at Meimad Television Studios and financed through the sale of Gulu-related merchandise.
- Good Night Shlompi (1990–1993): A follow-up show in which Shlomo Artzi and Tzipi Shavit read bedtime stories to a male puppet named Shlompi (a name formed by combining Shlomo and Tzipi), also voiced by Shilo. The show was parodied on The World Tonight.
- Yael in Cartoon Land (1990–1991): A show featuring interstitial segments between animated clips, hosted by Yael Karavan.
- Glitch (1991–1992): Summer program with two seasons hosted by Hani Nahmias; she initially co-hosted alongside Hanan Goldblatt and later with Dudu Dotan. These programs were broadcast from various water parks across Israel.
- Yom Yoman (1991–1993): A sponsored children's program hosted by Cheetos mascot Chester Cheetah (played by Yoav Tzafir in a Chester costume) and Hagit Dasberg. Occasionally, the show featured guest appearances by Giuseppe—Chester's Italian brother—played by Yehoachin Friedlander.
- Shuki the Parrot (1992–1993): Moti Barkan travels across Israel, accompanied by a parrot named Shuki.
- Ve'Achshav Baruch (1990): Baruch was a green foam puppet with a squeaky voice, created and operated by puppeteer Roni Nelken-Mosenson from the Train Theater. Baruch hosted children on the show and conversed with them.
- Banana Boom (1992): A children's program hosted by Michael Hanegbi and Sivan Rahav-Meir. The show later moved to commercial Channel 2.
- Gan Chayot (Zoo): An animal-focused magazine show hosted by Michal Gottlieb. The show later moved to commercial Channel 2.

=== Acquired programs ===
- Intergirl
- The Adventures of Mark Twain
- Manga Fairy Tales of the World
- Pinocchio: The Series
- Neighbours (130 episodes were broadcast, until its rights were acquired by a cable channel and later, IETV)
- Home and Away
- Carson's Law
- Samurai Pizza Cats
- Fables of the Green Forest
- Inspector Gadget
- Grimm's Fairy Tale Classics
- Gamodi atz haAlon (original title not known), broadcast in the children's slot
- Charlie Chalk
- Orm and Cheep
- A Bunch of Munsch
- Hana no Ko Lunlun
- The Adventures of Hutch the Honeybee
- Japanese Puppet Theater (original title not known), broadcast in the children's slot
