= Israeli-Ethiopian Television =

TV channel about Ethiopian Jews

Israeli-Ethiopian Television (IETV, Hebrew: ערוץ הטלוויזיה הישראלי האתיופי) is a cable and satellite channel targeting Ethiopian Jews living in Israel. The channel started broadcasting in 2007 by Fasil Legesse, who moved to Israel in 1981.

== History ==
In December 2006, the Israeli government greenlighted the entrance of dedicated channels for Ethiopian and Georgian populations living in the country, replacing BBC Prime on cable, due to cost issues. In order to accommodate the entrance of both channels and CCTV-9, it, alongside Adventure One and Eurosport News, had their slots removed.

IETV was inaugurated on January 21, 2007 with the presence of Ethiopian ambassador to Israel Fiseha Asgedom. Its broadcasts started the following day with a seven-hour schedule from 5pm to midnight. The channel targeted an audience of 120,000 Ethiopian Jews at launch, and then-prime minister Ehud Olmert justified the fact that it would preserve the Amharic language and Ethiopian culture to its target audience.

As of 2009, 30% of its programming was produced in Israel, receiving the most praive from its viewers.

By 2018, IETV had a target audience of 150,000 viewers in 20,000 households and had plans to start subtitling its drama and entertainment output to Hebrew.
