= Hala TV =

Israeli television channel

- Country: Israel
- Broadcast area: Israel
- Headquarters: Jerusalem

Programming
- Picture format: 576i SDTV

Ownership
- Owner: Panorama Group

History
- Launched: 12 March 2012

Links
- Website: www.hala-tv.com

Hala TV (Arabic: هلا; Hebrew: הלא TV) is an Israeli commercial television channel that broadcasts in the Arabic language. The channel began broadcasting in 2012.

The channel's broadcasts are transmitted over three platforms: by conventional satellite, the cable company HOT and the satellite company yes.

The establishment of the channel was accompanied by difficulties for over a decade. After two failed tenders issued by the Cable and Satellite Council, another tender, a third, was published, with extremely lenient conditions in favor of the winner. With the winning of the "Hala TV" group, the channel started broadcasting in March 2012.

== History ==
=== First tender ===
In 1995, the Minister of Communications, Shulamit Aloni, announced a plan to establish two dedicated channels - an Arab channel and a religious channel, whose funding was supposed to be from advertisements and whose purpose was to appeal to certain segments of the population and not to the entire population like the rest of the major broadcast channels. In May 1996, the Ministry of Communications published a tender for a license to operate an Arabic language channel on cable television in Israel. The decision stemmed from the social need for the integration of Israeli Arabs into Israeli society. The Arabic-speaking population in Israel reached a rate of about twenty percent of the total population in Israel, and therefore it was decided to implement a channel that would reach this segment of the population. The tender forms were purchased by 12 groups. The owners of the Channel 2 franchises petitioned the High Court against the tender, claiming that the tender contradicts the Bezeq Law, which only allows them to broadcast advertisements. As a result, in April 1997, the Knesset enacted an amendment to the Bezeq Law, which allows the transmission of dedicated cable channels. And the Ministry of Communications announced that it would soon republish the tender. The amendment to the law also established binding rules on the nature of the broadcasts, after a hard fight with the Channel 2 franchisees. According to the rules, at least 50% of the programs, including in prime time, must be in the Arabic language, and not in translation. A quota of 20% original production was also set. The advertisements also had to be in the Arabic language.

The Ministry of Communications did not republish a tender for an Arab channel, after in August 1997 the government approved the report of the Yossi Peled Committee, which was established to prepare a proposal for expanding and reorganizing the public television and radio broadcasting system. The report recommended adopting a new policy to create a free market for electronic communications, which On the principle of "open skies" for all. The committee recommended the granting of licenses for direct satellite broadcasts to the consumer's home (satellite television - YES), the establishment of an additional commercial channel (later Channel 10) and the establishment of five or six dedicated channels - in the Arabic language, for Russian and Amharic speakers, for Israel's heritage, a channel for Israeli music, a news and information channel, all funded by commercial advertising.

In 1998, the Ministry of Communications, through the Council for Cable and Satellite Broadcasting, published the tender for early screening for the establishment of five dedicated channels that are funded by advertisements and whose purpose is to appeal to certain segments of the population and not to the entire population as in the terrestrial channels. The decision included the establishment of an Arabic channel (Hala TV), a news channel, a channel in Russian, a music channel (Channel 24) and a heritage channel. But after the publication of the tender for the early screening, the publication of an individual tender for the channel was delayed for several years.

=== Second tender ===
In 2004, the Council for Cable and Satellite Broadcasting decided to carry out another tender and try to establish the channel. The tender book was purchased by several groups and in the end they all chose not to go and compete for winning the tender, with the exception of one contestant, "Ananey Communications". In June 2004, "Ananey Communications" received the license to establish the channel. In June 2005, the "Ananey Communications" company informed the Cable Broadcasting Council that it would not exercise the license it had received because it had not recruited Arab partners, and in light of the lack of economic viability. At the same time, the council decided to cancel the award after the company did not meet deadlines.

=== Third tender ===
Despite the failure of the two previous tenders, the Cable and Satellite Council decided in February 2008 to issue another tender, the third in number, for the establishment of the channel. The tender was published on April 14, 2010, when later in the month groups wishing to access the tender were given the opportunity to purchase the tender book including the terms of the franchise. The deadline for access to the tender was postponed several times and was finally set for December 12.

Understanding that the communications market has changed over the years and due to the fear that the current tender will also fail, the Cable and Satellite Council under the chairmanship of the council's chairman, Nitzan Chen, decided to significantly ease the conditions of the tender and favor the winner while promising a license that would be valid for ten years. In addition, the winner was promised that the channel will be included in the DTT channel package Idan+ and the basic channel packages in the cable and satellite companies.

In the terms of the franchise, published in the tender book and bought by eight groups, it was determined that the winner of the tender must broadcast in the first year of the channel's frequencies for six hours a day. In the third year, the book states, the franchisee will be required to broadcast eight hours a day, which also include a news bulletin of at least 20 minutes. During the first two years of the channel's operation, the franchisee will be required to invest NIS 2 million in local production, and in the fourth year - double the amount.

With the expiration of the deadline for submitting bids for the tender, only one bid was received from the "Hala TV" group, which was founded as a result of the cooperation of several parties, including: the Channel 2 network franchisee, the "Enani Communication" company, the owners of the Arab-Israeli site Fant and other businessmen. After receiving the group's proposal, it was determined in the Cable and Satellite Council that after several months, upon completion of the examination of the proposal, the decision regarding it will be made.

At the end of the discussions in the Cable and Satellite Council, it was decided to unanimously approve the only proposal that was submitted and the "Hala TV" company was designated as the winner of the tender for the license to operate the dedicated channel in the Arabic language. In September 2011, the representatives of the company received the license from the Minister of Communications, Moshe Kahlon.

=== Going on air ===
With the winning of the "Hala TV" group, the company announced that the channel would go on air in March 2012, while managing a hectic schedule. At the same time, the channel began to formulate a comprehensive broadcast schedule and recruited presenters and moderators. In addition, pilots for various programs were filmed and ideas for new content were formulated. The heads of the company also turned to Israeli advertising companies with a request to direct part of the advertising budgets to them and to put up broad campaigns also on the airwaves of the channel. Their appeal was justified by the fact that they are the only channel in Israel that appeals to the Arab population - which is about 20% of all the country's residents.

The channel eventually went live on 12 March 2012, after several days of test broadcasts, when it took over channel 131 on the HOT platform and channel 169 on the yes platform. A short time later, the companies began to broadcast the channel on channel 30 (on yes it was also broadcast simultaneously on channel 141). In the first two years of its operation, the channel was plagued by financial difficulties and a struggle between its many shareholders. In addition, the channel received low viewing percentages.

=== Change of ownership ===
In March 2015, the Cable and Satellite Council approved the transfer of ownership of the channel to businessman and journalist Bassem Jaber, owner of the Panorama Group, a prominent media corporation in the Arab sector that operates the Panorama newspaper and the Fant website. Jaber launched a new broadcast schedule that almost quadrupled the investments in original productions, up to 96 hours.

In 2016, the channel was on the verge of closure due to cumulative losses of tens of millions, and also due to its non-compliance with the content requirements that it committed to in the license conditions. The channel did not make the investment it committed to (approximately NIS 60 million) in the content of an original Israeli work, and the Cable and Satellite Council was supposed to discuss the denial of its license. After Channel 20 (the current Channel 14), which is associated with the political right wing in Israel, also exceeded the terms of its license, according to which it was supposed to be a channel for Israel's heritage, by broadcasting mainly news and current affairs programs. The government and members of the Knesset from the right mobilized to help, and during 2017 legislation was passed that changed the regulation on the dedicated channels and actually freed them from almost all the substantial content obligations they had. As a result, even Hala TV included in this definition received substantial reliefs approved by the legislation, thus actually being saved from closure. Hala TV received approval from the authorities to broadcast on Yom Kippur, a day in which most television channels in Israel are off air. The Israeli Arab publication Adalah contested the shutdown under the grounds of "violations of freedom of religion". Hala TV had appealed in previous years, but without success. In 2019, the channel became profitable for the first time. According to surveys by the Government Advertising Bureau, Hala TV is (as of the beginning of the 2020s of the 21st century) the most watched television channel among Israeli Arabs.
