= Kan Educational =

Israeli children's television channel

Channel KAN Educational ("KAN Educational" כאן חינוכית)
- Country: Israel
- Broadcast area: National
- Headquarters: Jerusalem

Programming
- Picture format: 16:9 (576i, SDTV); 1080i HDTV 2160p UHDTV

Ownership
- Owner: Israeli Public Broadcasting Corporation
- Sister channels: Kan 11; Makan 33

History
- Launched: 15 August 2018; 7 years ago
- Former names: Israeli Educational Television

Links
- Website: www.kankids.org.il

Availability

Terrestrial
- Digital (DVB-T): Channel 99 (formerly Channel 23)

Streaming media
- www.kankids.org.il/kids-live/

Kan Educational (Hebrew: כאן חינוכית, Kan Hinuchit) is a public television channel in Israel designated for children, on behalf of the Israel Broadcasting Corporation. The channel launched on 15 August 2018 and replaced Israeli Educational Television (IETV), which preceded it. It now broadcasts existing IETV programs including older and newer programs, as well as provides new seasons to some of those programs, and also introduces new series. All of its content will be bought from third parties, unlike IETV who produced many of their shows in-house.

== History ==
Following a reform in public broadcasting initiated by the government and approved by the Knesset in the summer of 2014, the Israeli Broadcasting Authority was replaced in 2017 by the Israeli Broadcasting Corporation (aka KAN).

On 15 August 2018, the Israeli Educational Television was shut down and has been replaced by a new kids and youth channel named KAN Educational, now a part of the Israel Public Broadcasting Corporation.

The channel moved from Channel 23 to Channel 80 on 5 January 2021.

== Programming ==
=== Original shows ===
- Anachnu Kan (אנחנו כאן)
- Ateret Hatzeva (אתגר הצבע)
- Bluga Blues (בלוגה בלוז)
- Cafe Amalya (קפה עמליה)
- Cramel (כראמל)
- Chayot Reshet (חיות רשת)
- Chayot Shetach (חיות שטח)
- Ha'achain sheli benz (האחיין שלי בנץ)
- HaBe'er (הבאר)
- Hamenachem ha-25 (המתחם ה-25)
- HaShmartefim (השמרטפים)
- HaShofetet Lital (השופטת ליטל)
- Ir Hamisparim (עיר המספרים)
- Kol Od Bilvad (כל עוד בלבב)
- Lamah Zeh Tov? (למה זה טוב?)
- Levad Babait (לבד בבית)
- Makif Milano (מקיף מילאנו)
- Mi Po HaBoss? (?מי פה הבוס)
- Mischakey HaMoach (משחקי המוח)
- Mishpacha Be'oto (משפחה באוטו)
- Meyuchedet (מיוחדת)
- Parpar Nechmad - New Version (פרפר נחמד - גרסה חדשה)
- Rak BeHatzbaa (רק בהצבעה)
- Sha'at Sipur Im Nasi Hamedinah (שעת סיפור עם נשיא המדינה)
- Shakshouka (שקשוקה)
- Selicha shel hasheilah (סליחה על השאלה)
- VeHaYeled HaZe Hu Ani (והילד הזה הוא אני)
- Yaldei Bayit Ha'etz (ילדי בית העץ)

=== Shows from Israeli Educational Television ===
- Avudim BaRibua (אבודים בריבוע)
- Bahatzer Shel Pupik (בחצר של פופיק)
- BaHeder Shel Hanny (בחדר של חני)
- BeSod HaYinyanim (בסוד העניינים)
- Bli Sodot (בלי סודות)
- Dan VeMuesli (דן ומוזלי)
- Esrim Plus (עשרים פלוס)
- BaBait Shel Fistuk (בבית של פיסטוק)
- HaChafranim (החפרנים)
- HaYeladim MiSchoonat Hayim (הילדים משכונת חיים)
- Hayot Bama (חיות במה)
- Hayot Bama Live! (חיות במה בהופעה)
- Heshbon Pashoot (חשבון פשוט)
- Inyan Shel Zman (עניין של זמן)
- Keshet VeAnan (קשת וענן)
- Knesset Nichbada (כנסת נכבדה)
- Kriyat Kivun (קריאת כיוון)
- Tiruu Oti (תראו אותי)
- Ma HaSipur? (מה הסיפור?)
- Ma Pitom?! (!?מה פתאום)
- Ma Ze Muze (מה זה מוזה)
- Matti HaBalash HaMathemati (מתי בלש מתמטי)
- HaIIparon Hachi Mechudad (העיפרון הכי מחודד)
- Olam HaBubot Shel Gali (עולם הבובות של גלי)
- Parpar Nechmad (פרפר נחמד)
- Philo and Sophy (פילו וסופי)
- Rechov Sumsum (רחוב סומסום)
- Rega im Dodley (רגע עם דודלי)
- Shuster VeShuster (שוסטר ושוסטר)
- Shraga Bishgada (שרגא בישגדא)
- Tzemer VeYaeli (צמר ויעלי)
- Yaldey Beit HaEtch (ילדי בית העץ)

=== Shows from Channel 1 (Israel) ===
- Chayot VeChiyuchim (חיות וחיוכים)
- Rosh Kroov (ראש כרוב)
- Carousela (קרוסלה)
- Foxy Fables (משלים שועליים)
- Hopa Hey (הופה היי)
- Jinji (ג'ינג'י)
- Mesibat Gan (מסיבת גן)
- HaChofesh HaAcharon (החופש האחרון)
- Agadot HaMelech Shlomo (אגדות המלך שלמה)
- Sammy VeSusu (סמי וסוסו)
- Lo Kolel Sheirut (לא כולל שירות)
- HaChatul Shmeel (החתול שמיל)
- Tlooim BaAvir (תלויים באוויר)
- Kach Sikuy (קח סיכוי)
- HaTzrif Shel Tamari (הצריף של תמרי)
- Telepele (טלפלא)
- Shalosh Arba Hamesh VaChetzi (שלוש ארבע חמש וחצי)
- Tofsim Rosh (תופסים ראש)
- Toses (תוססס)
- Smoch Alay (סמוך עליי)
- HaTsatskanim (הצצקנים)
- Tzipi Bli Hafsaka (ציפי בלי הפסקה)
- Zap LaRishon (זאפ לראשון)
- Rich Rach (ריץ' רץ')

=== Imported TV shows broadcast on Kan Educational ===
- Bluey
- Beat Bugs
- Charlie and Lola
- Dinosaur Train
- Dot.
- Fraggle Rock
- Gigantosaurus
- Hero Elementary
- Johnny Test (2021 TV series)
- Llama Llama
- The Littl' Bits
- Martha Speaks
- Miraculous: Tales of Ladybug & Cat Noir
- The Ollie & Moon Show
- Once Upon a Time... Life
- Ready Jet Go!
- Sadie Sparks
- Shaun the Sheep
- The Smurfs
- Splash and Bubbles
- The Storyteller
- Zack & Quack
