= Channel 33 (Israel) =

Former Israeli television channel

- Country: Israel
- Broadcast area: National
- Headquarters: Jerusalem

Programming
- Picture format: 4:3 576i SDTV

Ownership
- Owner: IBA
- Sister channels: Channel 1

History
- Launched: 22 February 1994
- Closed: 14 May 2017
- Replaced by: Makan 33
- Former names: Channel 3 - IBA (1994–1998)

Links
- Website: http://www.iba.org.il

Availability

Terrestrial
- Digital terrestrial television: Channel 33

Streaming media
- IBA broadcast centre: http://www.iba.org.il/media

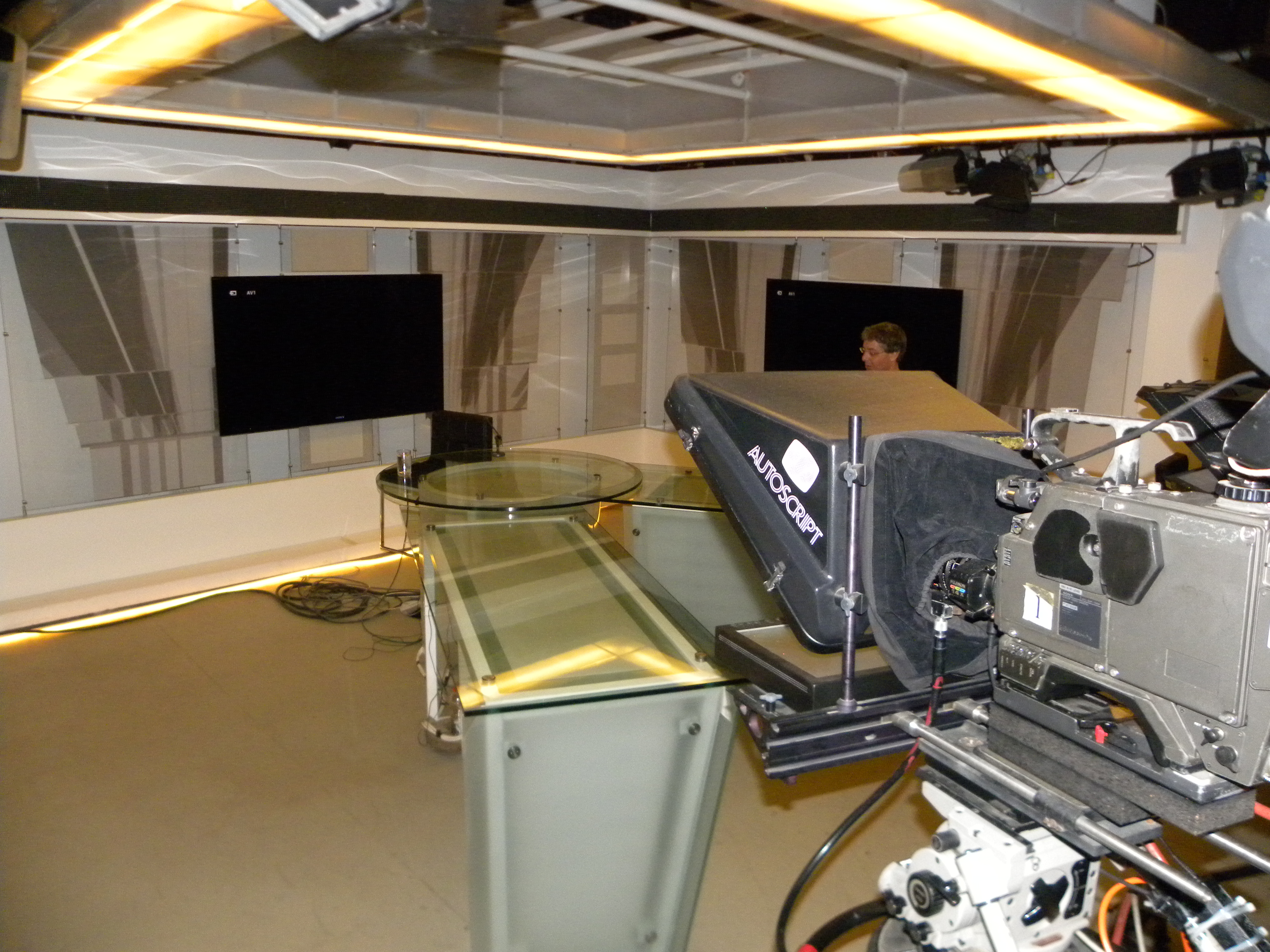
Studio of Channel 33

Channel 33 (Hebrew: ערוץ 33; Arutz Shloshim VeShalosh) was an Israeli Arabic-language free-to-air television channel, operated by the Israel Broadcasting Authority (IBA), which was primarily designated for Arabic-speaking viewers.

== History ==
=== Background ===
Before the establishment of Channel 33, Israeli Television had an early evening programming slot in Arabic. By 1971, it did counter-programming with Jordanian TV by airing popular Arabic-language programming when the opposite country's channel was airing the news.

=== Establishment – 1994 ===
The channel was launched in 1994 as a result of the Israeli–Palestinian peace process. The Israeli prime-minister Itzhak Rabin decided to establish a government-operated satellite channel in Arabic, which was intended for viewers in neighbouring Arab countries. Soon after its establishment, the channel began to relay broadcasts from the Knesset, the Israeli parliament.

=== Reviving the channel – 1998 ===
In early 1998, the channel was given a new brand due to low viewership. The new brand was "Channel 33" with the slogan "Channel 33 - Much more interesting!".

The name "Channel 33" was chosen since the channel is relayed at station no. 33 in the Israeli cable systems. Before the introduction of digital terrestrial television, the channel's terrestrial footprint was limited to Haifa, on VHF channel 10.

=== Arabic-language broadcasts era – 2002 ===
In 2002, the IBA established a third TV channel – the IBA Arabic Channel – which was intended for Arabic-speaking viewers in foreign countries (this was the original purpose that Channel 33 was established for) and for Arabic-speaking Israelis. For the latter purpose, the "Israel Television in Arabic" department of the IBA, which until then broadcast on IBA Channel 1 2–4 hours a day, had moved to the new channel, where Channel 1 was left only with Hebrew programming. Some years earlier, in 1985, Israel Television in Arabic had been awarded the prestigious Israel Prize, for its special contribution to society and the State. The IBA Arabic Channel was broadcasting via the European Hot Bird satellite.

Due to a lack of Arabic programs, the channel also broadcast reruns from the IBA's Channel 1 and Channel 33. Soon after its establishment, the IBA had realised that it could not financially support three TV channels, and decided to merge Channel 33 with the Arabic channel into a new IBA "Channel 3 - Middle East" in early 2004.

As a result, Channel 33 replaced IBA Arabic Channel on the European satellite in April 2004, and began an all-Europe coverage. Additionally, Channel 33 began a terrestrial transmission throughout Israel, in order to relay Arabic programming to Arabic-speaking Israelis.

=== Knesset transmission concession loss – 2004 ===
Due to the merge of IBA's Arabic channel and Channel 33, there was little air-time left in the unified channel to relay to Knesset sessions. Because of that, and an initiative to establish a parliament channel (like C-SPAN in the United States) the Knesset passed a new law – "TV Transmission from the Knesset" in 2004 which led to the establishment of the "Knesset Channel", following a public tender in which the IBA had lost the concession to "The Second news company". Starting on 3 May 2004, the Knesset broadcasts are relayed in Knesset Channel.

== Later years ==
The channel was dedicated primarily to Arab-speaking viewers, but due to financial reasons, the IBA had to cut the all-European coverage of Channel 33 through the European Hot Bird satellite, a move that affected many viewers of the channel. In its last years on air, the channel was relayed terrestrially in Israel, and by the Israeli AMOS satellite on its Middle-East beam. In 2010, The Israel Broadcasting Authority (IBA) English television news director Steve Leibowitz came out against a proposal by Knesset Economics Committee head Ophir Akunis on Monday to close down Channel 33 as a cost-cutting move. Although it could've saved as much as NIS 60 million, opposition claimed it would reduce broadcast time.

There were plans to turn Channel 33 in a news and information station broadcasting in Hebrew, Arabic and English along the lines of Reshet Bet, the popular public radio station. In 2013, IBA Channel 33 was expected to resume all-European coverage through the Hot Bird satellite.

== Closure ==
The Israel Broadcasting Authority (IBA) was closed on 14 May 2017, and so was Channel 33. The authority was replaced by the Israeli Public Broadcasting Corporation (IPBC), branded in Arabic as Makan, with Makan 33 replacing the former Channel 33.
