= Makan 33 =

Arabic-language Israeli television channel

- Country: Israel
- Broadcast area: Israel
- Headquarters: Jerusalem

Programming
- Language: Arabic
- Picture format: 1080i HDTV (downscaled to 16:9 576i for the SDTV feed)

Ownership
- Owner: Israeli Public Broadcasting Corporation
- Sister channels: Kan 11

History
- Launched: 15 May 2017; 9 years ago
- Replaced: Channel 33

Links
- Website: www.makan.org.il

Availability

Terrestrial
- Digital terrestrial television: Channel 33
- Satellite: Eutelsat 8 West B (8 West) on 11637 V

Streaming media
- Live stream

Makan 33 (Hebrew: מכאן 33; Arabic: مكان 33) is an Israeli Arabic-language free-to-air television channel aimed at the country's Arab community, on behalf of the Israeli Public Broadcasting Corporation (IPBC), branded as Kan in Hebrew and Makan in Arabic. The channel was launched in May 2017 and replaced Channel 33, which had been operated by the Israel Broadcasting Authority (IBA).

== History ==
The channel started broadcasting on 15 May 2017 at 5:30pm.

In March 2018, Kan announced that Makan 33 would air the that year's FIFA World Cup for the first time in Arabic. As the IBA, it tried doing the same for its predecessor Channel 33 in 2010, but abandoned the idea after receiving threats from Al-Jazeera Sports. During the World Cup, on 1 July 2018, the channel converted to high definition on the DVB-T2 multiplex of digital terrestrial provider Idan+. When the World Cup ended, it launched a new schedule, costing NIS 20 million.

== Criticism ==
Makan 33's YouTube channel was removed from the platform in July 2019 after receiving three content strikes. The corporation resolved the issue.

In May 2020, the Boycott, Divestment and Sanctions movement criticized the channel's satirical series Al-Balad Al-Bahir after airing a segment with actors from Fauda, which the organization understood as "Israeli propaganda", and that the program served the "Zionist project" against the Palestinian people.

In January 2022, a song parodying the normalization of Israel's ties with the United Arab Emirates (Dubai, Dubai) aired on the channel. The video triggered negative reactions from other Arabic countries.
