= Israeli Educational Television =

Former Israeli television channel

Israeli Educational Television הטלוויזיה החינוכית הישראלית
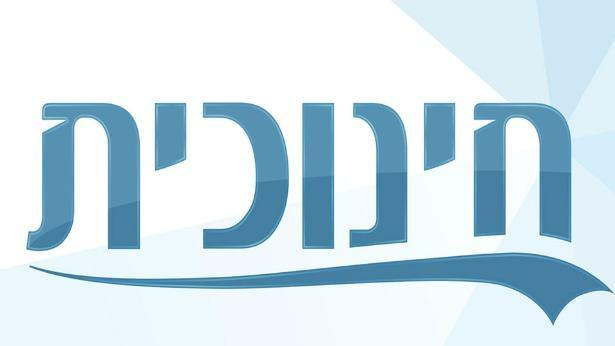
- Last logo, used from 2013 to 2018
- Type: Terrestrial television
- Country: Israel
- Availability: National
- Headquarters: Tel Aviv, Jerusalem, Israel
- Owner: Israeli Ministry of Education
- Launch date: 24 March 1966; 60 years ago
- Dissolved: 14 August 2018; 7 years ago
- Former names: The Instructional Television Trust; The Center for Instructional Television
- Official website: www.23tv.co.il
- Language: Hebrew
- Replaced by: Kan Educational

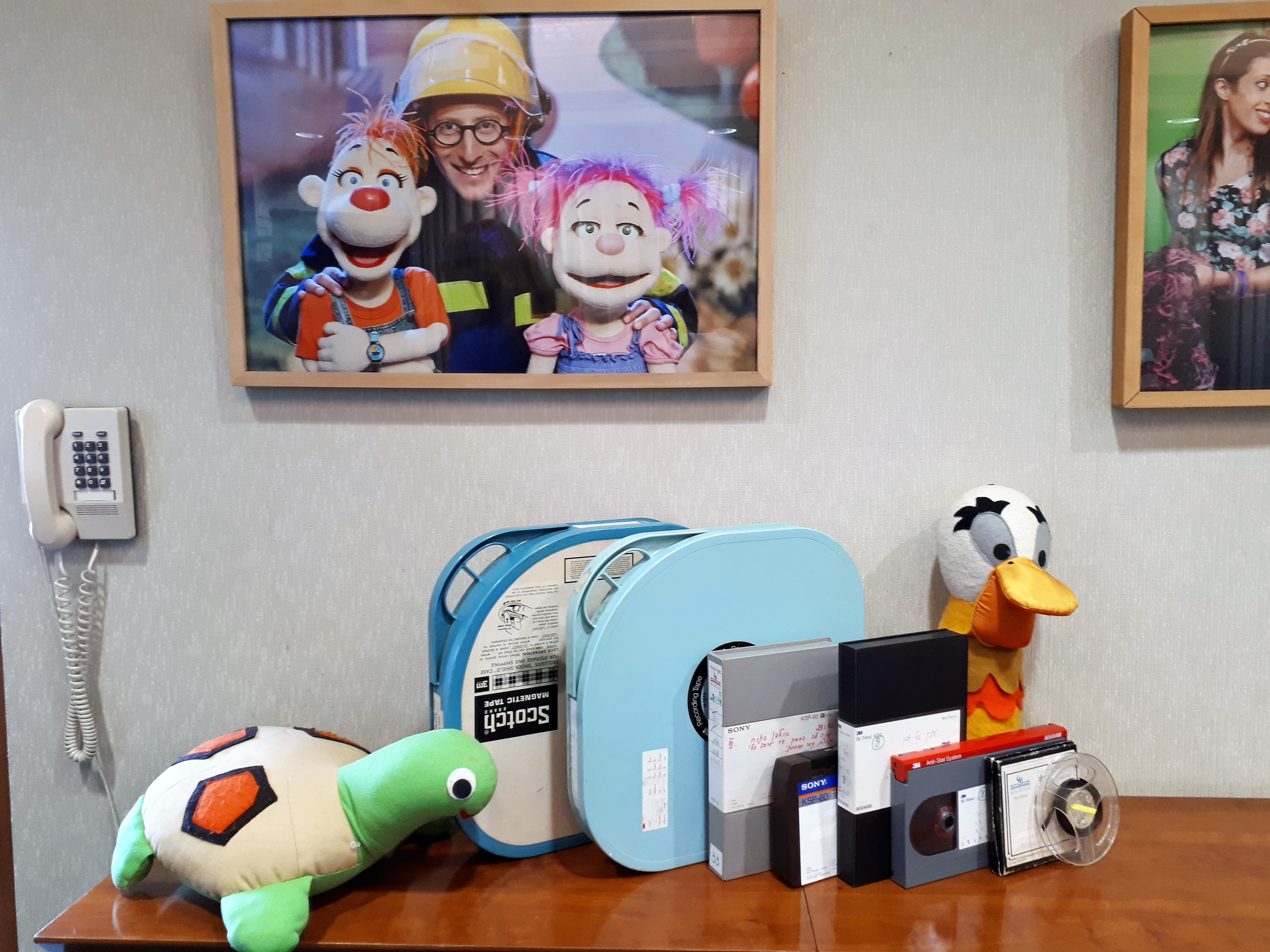
IETV's meeting room in Tel Aviv, presenting puppets from IETV's shows, archive recordings, and show posters. April 2018

Israeli Educational Television (IETV), (Note: Hebrew: הטלוויזיה החינוכית הישראלית, HaTelevízya HaChinuchít HaYisraelít) informally known as Chinuchit, (Note: Hebrew: חינוכית [χinuˈχit] – the feminine form of 'educational') was a state-owned public terrestrial television network which used to concentrate on producing and broadcasting programs for school children.

The first Israeli children's show, featuring Kishkashta, aired on Channel 1 in the 1970s and 1980s. However, since the 1980s, IETV began to produce TV magazines and programs aimed at adults and senior citizens.

== History ==
IETV was established in 1965 as a joint project of the Israeli Ministry of Education and the Rothschild Foundation. It was the first television station in Israel, and its first broadcast, launched in March 1966, was the first television transmission in Israel. In those days the Israeli government was reluctant to introduce television transmissions claiming it would lead to cultural decadence. However limited broadcasts as an instructional tool were approved.

The first transmission was launched on 24 March 1966. Levi Eshkol, the Israeli prime minister, pressed a symbolic button to mark the beginning of the transmission. Lord Victor Rothschild delivered a speech on behalf of the Rothschild Fund. The then-called Instructional Television Trust opened its regular transmission with televised broadcasts of Mathematics, Biology and English classes. 60 television sets were distributed to 32 schools to receive the first broadcasts and comment on their quality. As from the early 1970s and until the early 1990s it was known as the Instructional Television Centre. IETV produced mainly children's programming in this phase.

Within its first year of existence the IETV expanded its infrastructure, and began to broadcast nationwide. On 2 May 1968, it began to share its channel with the newly established IBA's general public channel. The two organizations would share a single channel for many years to come, the only Israeli television channel until the late 1980s, when the experimental transmissions of the Israeli Channel 2 started.

When the then Channel 2 commercial channel launched officially in 1993, IETV received dedicated slots with commercial inserts.

On June 6, 1995, IETV launched another 24/7 dedicated new channel "Educational 23" which ran exclusively on cable television and from 2001 also on YES - Israel's only DTH (pay satellite television) service.

The station remained an autonomous unit of the Ministry of Education, and broadcast more than 200 hours of programming every week.

In December 2013, the channel re-branded as Educational (simply Hinuchit, in Hebrew), and focused on a new children and educational programming schedule from 5:00am Israel Time, as well as adult educational schedule from 8:00pm Israel Time. The channel also started to upload its shows to their official YouTube channel even before they broadcast on television.

Following a reform in public broadcasting initiated by the government and approved by the Knesset in the summer of 2014, the Israeli Broadcasting Authority was replaced in 2017 by the Israeli Broadcasting Corporation (aka KAN).

On 14 August 2018, the Educational Network was shut down and replaced by a new kids and youth channel Kan Educational, a part of the Israel Public Broadcasting Corporation.

== See also ==
- Television in Israel
- Israel Broadcasting Authority (IBA)
- Israeli Broadcasting Corporation (KAN)
