= Channel 24 (Israel) =

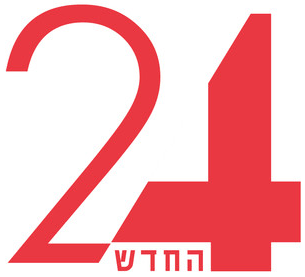
- Country: Israel
- Broadcast area: Nationwide
- Headquarters: Tel Aviv, Israel

Ownership
- Owner: Telad

History
- Launched: 20 July 2003; 23 years ago

Links
- Website: Channel 24

Channel 24 (Hebrew: ערוץ 24), formally known as Music 24 (Hebrew: מוזיקה 24), is an Israeli free-to-air television channel owned by Telad, which was launched on 20 July 2003 and broadcasts music videos by Israeli musicians. Apart from music videos, the channel has different music-related shows, including interviews with musicians, live performances, music-oriented talk shows and programs which are dedicated to a specific genre of music.

The channel's editor-in-chief, Yoav Kutner, has been one of the most influential figures in the Israeli rock scene. For more than 20 years he has been instrumental in introducing new singers, both Israeli and foreign, in his radio shows (which he quit in order to head the TV channel) to generations of Israeli music fans.

Music 24 has struggled through monetary and ratings problems since its inception. Critics claim it has become a niche channel for Israeli bands and singers which appear only on it and otherwise remain anonymous for the public at large. However, it has been responsible for advancing the careers of others.

In May 2019 the channel was sold to Telad, rebranded "The New Channel 24" and re-launched on 8 May and broadcasts Entertainment Shows and Movies besides the music videos and shows.

== History ==
The channel started broadcasting on 20 July 2003. At launch, it boasted an archive of 1,500 music videos catering the entire spectrum of Israeli music. The line-up was initially structured as follows:

- 6-10am: soft music videos
- 10am-6pm: latest hits
- 6-10pm: nostalgia
- 10pm-6am: showcase of rare music videos, as well as alternative and fringe bands

== See also ==
- Television in Israel
