= Channel 1 (Israel) =

Former Israeli television channel

- Channel 1's second and final logo, used from 1974 to 2017
- Country: Israel
- Broadcast area: National
- Headquarters: Jerusalem

Programming
- Picture format: 1080i HDTV (downscaled to 576i for the SD feed)

Ownership
- Owner: Israel Broadcasting Authority
- Sister channels: Channel 33

History
- Launched: 2 May 1968
- Closed: 14 May 2017 (49 years, 12 days)
- Former names: Israeli Television (1968–1994)

Links
- Website: www.iba.org.il

Availability

Terrestrial
- Digital terrestrial television: Channel 1

Channel 1 (Hebrew: הערוץ הראשון, romanized: HaArutz HaRishon, lit. 'The First Channel', sometimes called Arutz Ahat (1 ערוץ)) was the second oldest television channel in Israel (behind the Israeli Educational Television) and one of five terrestrial channels in the country (along with Channel 2, Channel 10, Channel 33 and the Knesset Channel).

Run by the Israel Broadcasting Authority, it started broadcasting on 2 May 1968, and was largely funded through a television licence, though there were some adverts. With the abolition of the Israel Broadcasting Authority and the establishment of the Israeli Public Broadcasting Corporation, Channel 1 closed down on 14 May 2017 and was replaced a few hours later by Kan 11.

== History ==
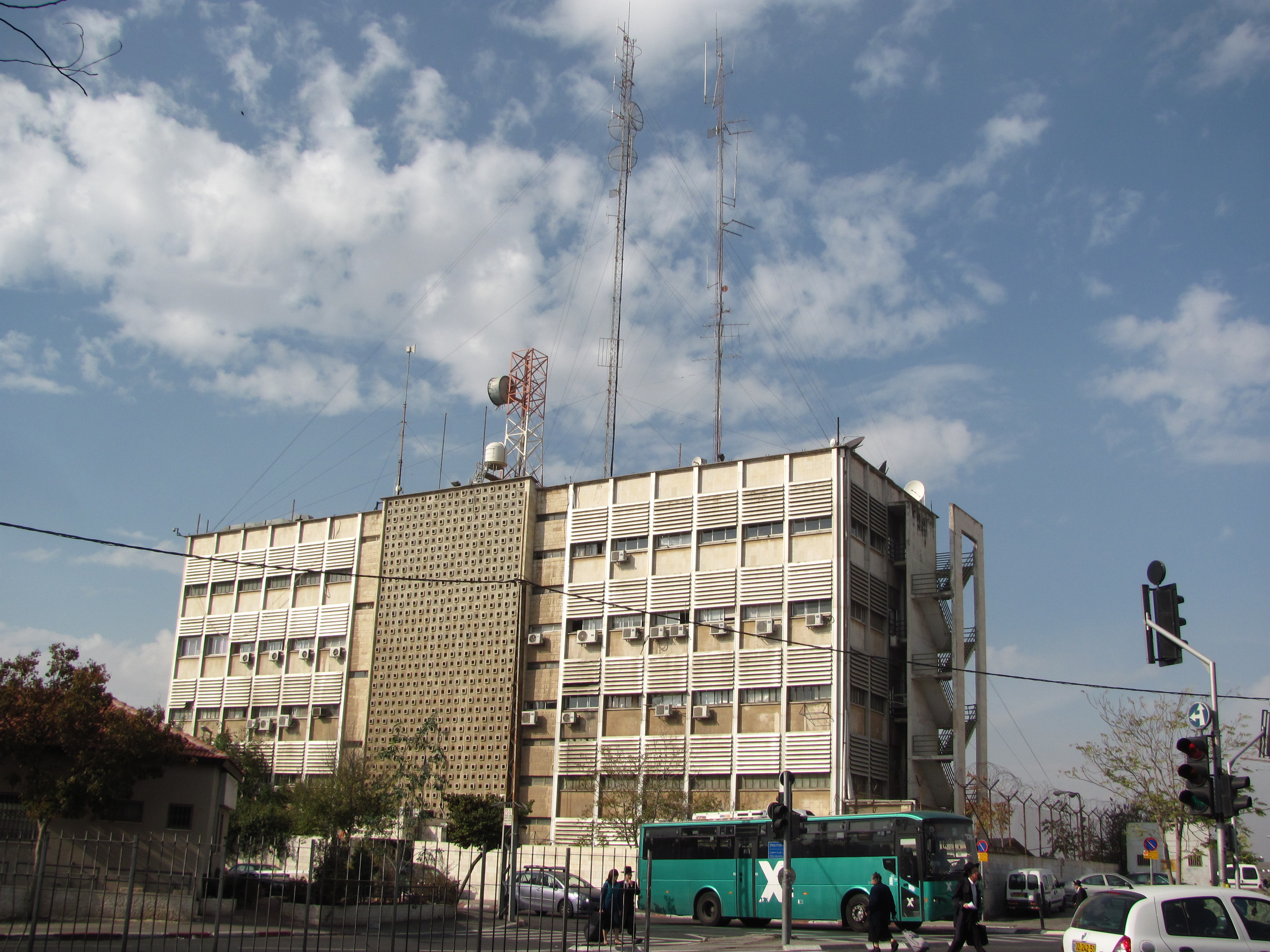
Channel 1's former head office in Romema, Jerusalem (2012)

The Knesset passed the law establishing the Israel Broadcasting Authority on 6 June 1965. From 1966, detailed planning to build the channel started with assistance from CBS vice-president Joe Stern. Channel 1 started broadcasting 2 May 1968. Up until then, only the IETV service existed, broadcasting on Channel 8 from the Eitanim transmitter, which covered Jerusalem and Tel Aviv.

Table of IBA television transmitters in 1977
Location	Channel	Transmitter power	ERP
Acre	5	0.24kW	20kW
Acre (UHF)	24	1kW	1.6kW
Beersheba	11	10kW	100kW
Carmel (Haifa)	10	10kW	100kW
Carmel (UHF)	46	20kW	200kW
Eilat	7	4kW	1kW
Eitanim (Jerusalem/Tel Aviv)	8	20kW	200kW
Grofit	10	4kW	40kW
Safed	6	4kW	1kW
Tel Aviv	27	2kW	6kW
Beersheba	11	10kW	100kW

The establishment of television, originally planned for the 1970s, was felt following the Six-Day War, and it was explained that through television broadcasts it was possible to improve Israeli information to the Arab countries and the residents of the territories. A five-story building was erected, though it was originally intended to be used by diamond polishing companies willing to move to Jerusalem. The companies refused (and continued in the coastal area) and IBA took advantage of the building.

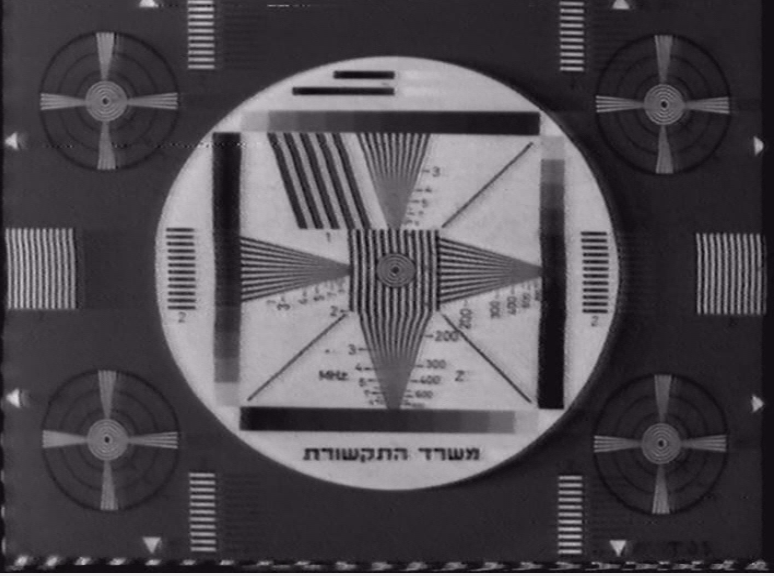
RETMA test pattern used by IBA Television in 1980

The station's first broadcast was a live broadcast of the IDF parade on Independence Day, which was held in May 1968, in Jerusalem. The broadcast frequency assigned to the station was the same frequency as Israel Educational Television, therefore the two stations have since shared the broadcast hours on the channel.

After several one-off broadcasts, in August 1968 regular test broadcasts began, initially three evenings a week, which were later expanded to four. During this period, one hour in Arabic and two hours in Hebrew were broadcast every day. The station broadcast in black and white, despite the fact that during this period there were already stations in a few parts of the world that already broadcast in color.

On 1 August of the same year, the first edition of Mabat laHadashot (A Glance at the News) was broadcast, this program was broadcast on Channel 1 until 9 May 2017, and for many years was presented by the host Haim Yavin, nicknamed "Mr. TV". In the same year, on 13 August 1968, the channel also broadcast for the first time the news bulletin in Arabic, presented by Gloria Stewart.

In the first year of broadcasting, Israeli television operated as an independent unit within the framework of an "establishment team" headed by Prof. Eliyahu Katz from the Department of Communication at the Hebrew University, and several art and media people participated in it, including the artist Ada Hamayrit (Schwartz). The first broadcasts of Israeli television were defined as trial broadcasts. Katz was actually the first director of Israeli television. After that, Israeli television merged with the state radio station, Kol Yisrael, which was already operating within the framework of the Broadcasting Authority (which was founded about three years before).

In 1969, there was a public uproar surrounding television broadcasts on Shabbat, when the Broadcasting Authority's plenum decided to expand the daily broadcast hours and switch from broadcasting four days a week to the entire week, including Fridays and Saturdays, beginning in November of that year. As part of the negotiations for the formation of the government after the elections to the Seventh Knesset held in October of that year, the representatives of the religious parties demanded that the broadcasts planned for Saturday night should be frozen. In the first week of November, when the daily broadcasts began, a commotion broke out over the issue. In the end, Prime Minister Golda Meir decided to temporarily respond to the demand of the religious, and freeze the opening of the broadcasts on Shabbat night. On Friday of that week, in the afternoon, two lawyers, Yehuda Ressler and Adi Kaplan, addressed the High Court of Justice. The judge on duty Zvi Berenzon issued a conditional order and the broadcasts started already that evening.

Since Channel 1 was broadcast on the same frequency as Educational Television, its broadcast times were limited. The channel began its broadcasts at 17:30. When the first hour was dedicated to children's programs, between 18:30 and 20:00 in the evening for broadcasts in Arabic (some claim that their purpose was propaganda), followed by four hours of television broadcasts for adults between 20:00 and midnight.

Most of the hours of Hebrew broadcasting in the 1970s for adults were allocated to the screening of foreign films, documentary content, and commercial series mainly from the United States and the United Kingdom. When the original Hebrew programs that were not current affairs programs were mainly interview programs (such as Petals), programs about a Hebrew singer (such as Sarti Lech Artzi), as well as entertainment formats, some of which were imported from the United States (such as local versions of I've Got a Secret and Hollywood Squares). The most prominent current affairs programs were Mabat LaHadashot that was broadcast at 9pm, which was estimated to be watched daily by about 70% of the owners of television receivers, This Week that summarized the week's news, and Moked, which was broadcast once a week and interviewed a senior politician. Original scripted content was almost never produced, with the most prominent among them in the 1970s being the sketch show Havoorat Lool, the satire program Niki Rosh and the drama series Hadva and Shlomik.

The airing of US series on Israeli television attracted a substantial overspill audience in Jordan, which had set up its own service at the same time as Israel.

The Yom Kippur War that broke out in October 1973 was the first war in which Israelis were able to watch Mabat's live images from the scene of the battles, close to the actual events, which raised the importance of the television medium in the field of current affairs.

On 19 November 1977, Egyptian President Anwar Sadat landed in Israel for a three-day visit and Channel 1 covered the course of the visit in color for the first time. Israel won the 1978 Eurovision Song Contest, but, due to the long voting time, the satellite IBA used to carry the event cut off its signal at 1am local time, ten minutes before A-Ba-Ni-Bi was officially declared the winning song, causing Israelis to miss the winning performance live. In 1979, the Eurovision Song Contest was broadcast from the IBA's buildings in Jerusalem live in color to the world and also in local distribution. Despite winning, Israel withdrew in 1980 over the cost of production and failure from the government to increase the IBA's budget. In the following years, Israeli television will carry out additional broadcasts in color in a limited and irregular periodicity. And only in February 1983 did regular color broadcasts begin, with the first color edition of Mabat broadcast on 16 February. In the late 1970s and early 1980s, talk shows of an entertainment nature joined the Hebrew broadcasting schedule on Shabbat evening to provide further entertainment, similar to the late night talk-show format that exists in the United States since the 1950s.

In 1985, the "Israel Television in Arabic" department was awarded the prestigious Israel Prize, for its special contribution to society and the State.

On 15 May 1990, Channel 1 began to distribute its broadcasts on a regular and regular basis also through a communication satellite and this as an addition to the use of terrestrial transmitters that had been customary since the beginning of the channel's operations.

The introduction of cable television and the second channel to Israel in the early nineties undermined the monopoly of the first channel. The most prominent programs that were broadcast in the nineties on Channel One were political debates Popolitica and the satire series The Fifth Chamber, which was broadcast at the beginning of Channel 2. Until 1994 the channel was called HaTelevizia HaKlalit (Hebrew: הטלוויזיה הכללית, lit. General Television) or HaTelevizia HaYisraelit (Hebrew: הטלוויזיה הישראלית, lit. Israeli Television), but officially became known as Channel 1 shortly after Channel 2 started broadcasting on 4 November 1993.

At the start of the 21st century the channel lost its image. Its ratings dropped, it was given the image of an "adult" channel, and criticism of it rose in light of the fact that its budget was extensive and was paid through the television fee.

On 6 May 2012, the channel's broadcast schedule was changed. In the new schedule, an attempt was made to compete with the commercial channels during the prime time hours. As part of the changes, the main news (up until then at 9pm) was moved from 8 minutes to eight and shortened to 38 minutes. After Mabat the channel aired the program "HaMosaf" hosted by Geula Even. Every evening at 19:00 the reality program "Let's eat with me" was broadcast, followed by "Hayom Be Sport" (The Day in Sports) – a daily sports magazine.

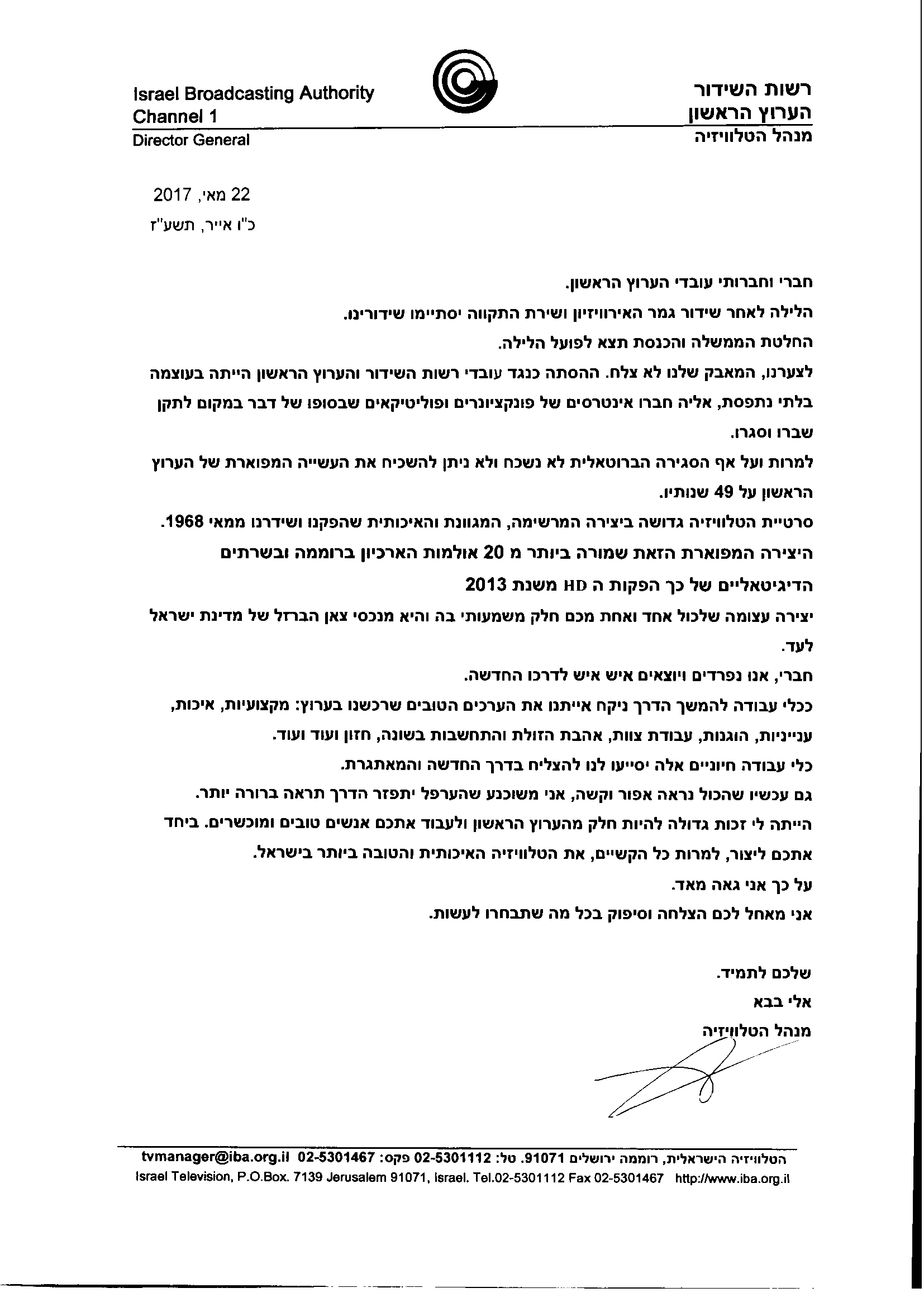
Farewell letter of Channel 1 president Eli Baba to the channel's staff (22 May 2017)

The channel's last news bulletin was on 9 May 2017, announced with two hours of notice. After this, the station did not carry news and current affairs programming until the channel's closure later in the week. Channel 1 was still tasked to broadcast the 2017 Eurovision Song Contest. During the voting in the final, IBA spokesman Ofer Nachshon delivered a farewell message on behalf of the corporation. When it ended at 1:50am on the early hours of 14 May 2017, the channel shut down partially, with IETV programming including the last edition of Erev Hadash in its old format (which would be renamed HaErev HaHadash before the 2018 shutdown) marking the end of definitive programming on the channel. From 15 May, Kan 11 took over the channel slot.

== Technology ==
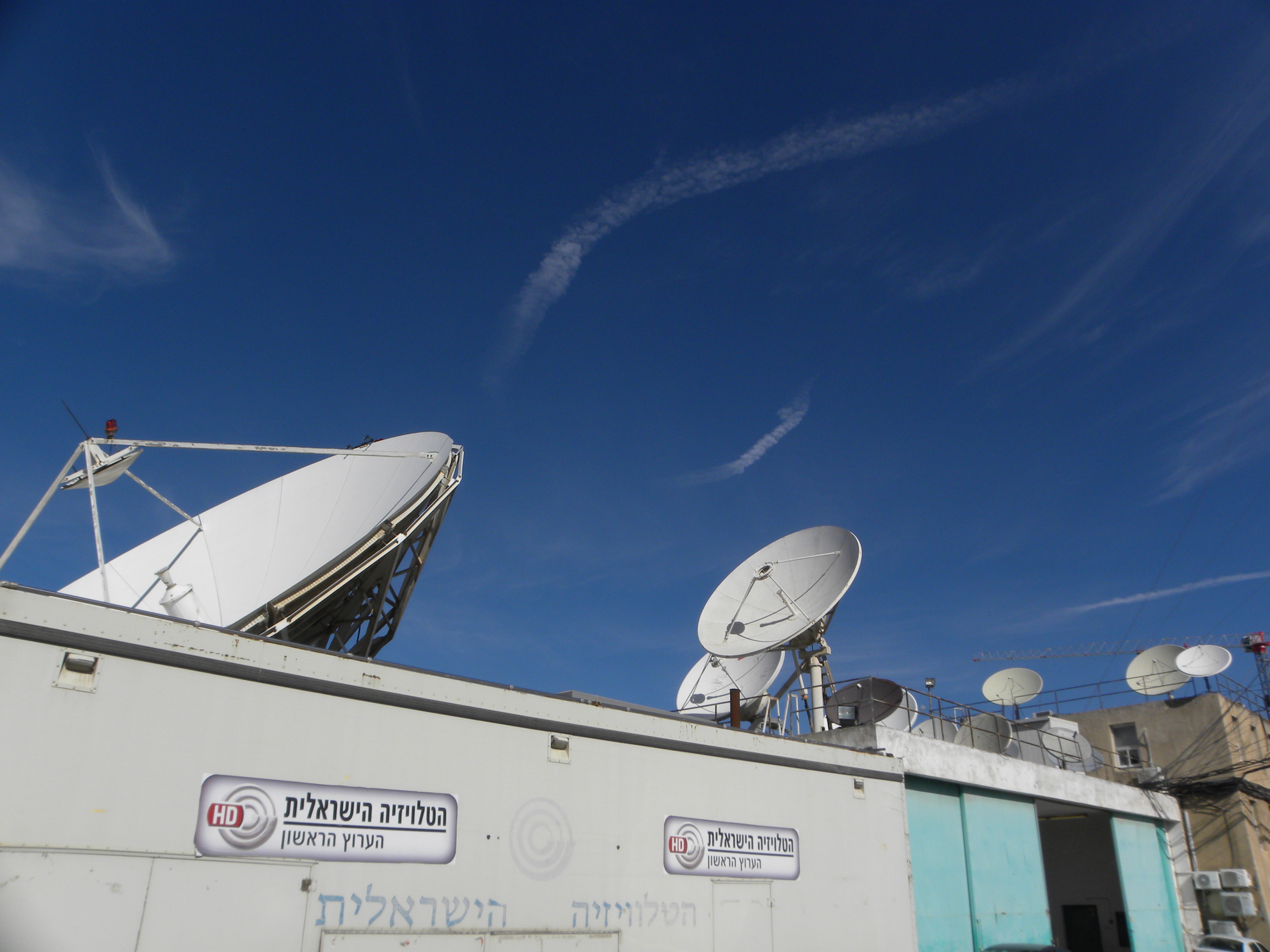
Satellite dishes at Channel 1's compound in Jerusalem

Since broadcasting began in 1968 the channel broadcast in PAL format. Since digital broadcasting in Israel began it also can be viewed for free using small box. Their first HD broadcasts were the semi-finals and the final of the Eurovision Song Contest 2010, and later the FIFA World Cup 2010. On 1 April 2011, Channel 1 became the first public broadcasting house in Israel to offer HD broadcasting. The channel broadcast Mabat, Channel 1's news program, in HD a year after. The channel offered a mixed selection of SD and HD programmes produced both locally and abroad. The HD feed was made available in late 2011, owing to the events of earlier in the year, when television stations in Israel ended analogue broadcasts.

== Identity ==
The channel gained its own logo in 1975. It was created by Benny Levin at the request of IBA news head Dan Shilon, to make a family of logos for the news and current affairs output of the channel. The aim was to create a symbol combining the arms of the menorah and transmitting waves. The circular version was the one used for the channel. Sports programs received a stadium-shaped version (with the three segments resembling lanes), an eye for Mabat Acher, a square for Moked and a hexagon for the Friday night program.

== Advertisements ==
Although the channel did not carry standard adverts, during breaks in high-profile programmes (such as coverage of Maccabi Tel Aviv's Euroleague matches) it displayed text on the screen, advertising companies, which was read out word-for-word by an announcer.

In addition to the text advertising, Channel 1 also showed public information films commissioned by the government. During the election time it shows the party political broadcasts.

== See also ==
- Television in Israel
- David Witzthum
- Kan 11
