= List of television channels in Israel =

This is a list of television channels available on digital terrestrial, satellite and cable systems in Israel. Channels shown in bright green are available free-to-air with Israel DTT service, called Idan+. Channels which are in a paler green can only be accessed via paid television providers

== National networks ==
Channel name	Owner/parent company	Broadcast hours	Aspect ratio	LCN
BabyFirst	Warner Bros. Discovery/Paramount Skydance	24 hours	16:9 SDTV	—N/a
BBC Entertainment	BBC	24 hours	4:3/16:9 SDTV	—N/a
Biography Channel/Lifetime (Israel)	A&E Television Networks/Telad	08:00–02:25	4:3/16:9 SDTV	—N/a
Kan 11	Israeli Broadcasting Corporation	24 hours	4:3/16:9 SDTV	11
Kan 11 4K	Israeli Broadcasting Corporation	Live events	4:3/16:9 UHDTV	511
Keshet 12	Keshet	24 hours	16:9 HDTV	12
Reshet 13	Reshet	24 hours	16:9 HDTV	13
Now 14	Second Authority for Television and Radio	24 hours, except Friday 15:00-Saturday 18:30	16:9	14
Channel 8	Noga Communications	24 hours	16:9 HDTV	—N/a
Channel 9	Second Authority for Television and Radio	24 hours	16:9	—N/a
Kan Educational	Israeli Broadcasting Corporation	24 hours	16:9 SDTV	80
Makan 33	Israeli Broadcasting Corporation	10:00–08:00	4:3/16:9 SDTV	33
Arutz HaYeladim	Noga Communications	06:10–05:50	4:3/16:9 SDTV	—N/a
Discovery Channel (Israel)	Warner Bros. Discovery	24 hours	4:3/16:9 SDTV	40
Disney Channel Israel	The Walt Disney Company	24 hours	4:3/16:9 SDTV	—N/a
E! (Israel)	E!/Telad	24 hours	4:3/16:9 SDTV	—N/a
History Channel (Israel)	A&E Television Networks/Telad	08:00–02:30	4:3/16:9 SDTV	—N/a
HOT3	HOT	08:55–04:30	4:3/16:9 SDTV	—N/a
HOT3 HD	HOT	08:55–04:30	16:9 HDTV	—N/a
Bollywood	Bollywood	24 hours	4:3/16:9 SDTV	—N/a
Bollywood HD	Bollywood	24 hours	16:9 HDTV	—N/a
Knesset Channel	Knesset/RGE/Reshet 13	24 hours	4:3/16:9 SDTV	99
MGM Channel (Israel)	MGM/Telad	24 hours	4:3/16:9 SDTV	—N/a
MGM HD (Israel)	MGM/Telad	24 hours	16:9 HDTV	—N/a
MTV Israel	MTV Network	24 hours	4:3/16:9 SDTV	25
Music 24	Telad	24 hours	4:3/16:9 SDTV	24
National Geographic (Israel)	National Geographic	24 hours	4:3/16:9 SDTV	—N/a
National Geographic Adventure (Israel)	National Geographic	24 hours	4:3/16:9 SDTV	—N/a
National Geographic HD (Israel)	National Geographic	24 hours	16:9 HDTV	—N/a
National Geographic Wild (Israel)	National Geographic	24 hours	4:3/16:9 SDTV	—N/a
Nickelodeon Israel	MTV Networks	24 hours	4:3/16:9 SDTV	—N/a
Sport 5	Sport 5	24 hours	16:9 SDTV	—N/a
Sport 5 HD	Sport 5	04:00-02:30	16:9 HDTV	—N/a
Sport +5	Sport 5	24 hours	16:9 SDTV	—N/a
Sport +5 GOLD	Sport 5	24 hours	16:9 SDTV	—N/a
Sport +5 LIVE	Sport 5	24 hours	16:9 SDTV	—N/a
Viva	Dori Media Group	24 hours	4:3/16:9 SDTV	35
yes Action HD	yes	24 hours	16:9 HDTV	17
yes Base	yes	24 hours	4:3/16:9 SDTV	—N/a
yes Real	yes	24 hours	4:3/16:9 SDTV	—N/a
yes Real HD	yes	24 hours	16:9 HDTV	—N/a
Disney Junior (Israel)	yes	24 hours	4:3/16:9 SDTV	—N/a
Yisrael Plus	Yisrael Plus	07:00–03:00	4:3/16:9 SDTV	9

== Foreign channels available in Israel ==
Channel name	Owner/parent company	Country of origin	Language	Notes
1+1 International	1+1 Media	Ukraine	Ukrainian
24 Horas	Radiotelevisión Española	Spain	Spanish
3sat	ARD, ZDF, SRF and ORF	Germany	German
8TV International	Prime Cinema	Russia	Russian
Al Aoula Inter	SNRT	Morocco	Arabic
Al Saudiya	Saudi Broadcasting Authority	Saudi Arabia	Arabic
Arte	Arte GEIE	France/Germany	French
BFM TV	NextRadioTV	France	French
Bobyor International	National Media Group	Russia	Russian
Carousel International	NMG/VGTRK	Russia	Russian
CGTN	CGTN (CCTV)	China	English	HD feed available
CGTN Documentary	CGTN (CCTV)	China	English
Channel One Worldwide	National Media Group	Russia	Russian
Daystar	Daystar	United States	English
Dom Kino	National Media Group	Russia	Russian
Domashniy International	STS Media	Russia	Russian
DW-TV	Deutsche Welle	Germany	English	German feed available until closure in 2024
Duna World	MTVA	Hungary	Hungarian
Egyptian Satellite Channel	National Media Authority	Egypt	Arabic
El Watania 1	Télévision Tunisienne	Tunisia	Arabic
Euronews	Alpac Capital	France/Portugal	English/Russian
Euro Star	Doğuş Media Group	Turkey	Turkish
Friday International	Gazprom-Media	Russia	Russian
Fox News	Fox Corporation	United States	English
Fox Business	Fox Corporation	United States	English
France 2	France Télévisions	France	French
France 3	France Télévisions	France	French
France 5	France Télévisions	France	French
France 24	France Médias Monde	France	French, Arabic, English
Inter+	GDF Media Group	Ukraine	Ukrainian
Jordanian Television	JRTC	Jordan	Arabic
Kvartal TV International	1+1 Media/Studio Kvartal-95	Ukraine	Ukrainian
LBC	LBC	Lebanon	Arabic
Lyubimoye Kino	Mediamart	United States/Israel	Russian
Mediaset Italia	Mediaset	Italy	Italian
Middle East Television	Messianic Vision	United States/Cyprus	English
Mosfilm Golden Collection	VGTRK	Russia	Russian
NTV Mir	Gazprom-Media	Russia	Russian
NTV Stil	Gazprom-Media	Russia	Russian
NHK World-Japan	NHK	Japan	English
O!	VGTRK	Russia	Russian
Pobeda	National Media Group	Russia	Russian
Poehali!	National Media Group	Russia	Russian
Pro TV Internațional	Central European Media Enterprises	Romania	Romanian
Rai Italia	RAI	Italy	Italian
Record Israel	Record Europa	Brazil	Portuguese
Ren TV International	National Media Group	Russia	Russian
RTL	RTL Group	Germany	German
RTR Planeta	VGTRK	Russia	Russian
RTVI	Mikayel Israelyan	United States/Israel	Russian
RTVI Retro	Mikayel Israelyan	United States/Israel	Russian
Russia-24	VGTRK	Russia	Russian
SAT.1	ProSiebenSat.1 Group	Germany	German
Shanson TV	VGTRK	Russia	Russian
Sky News	Comcast	United Kingdom	English
STS International	STS Media	Russia	Russian
TV Center International	Government of Moscow	Russia	Russian
Telecafe	National Media Group	Russia	Russian
Telefe Internacional	Gustavo Scaglione	Argentina	Spanish
TRT 1	TRT	Turkey	Turkish
TV5MONDE	TV5MONDE SA	France	French
TVE Internacional	Radiotelevisión Española	Spain	Spanish
TVRi	TVR	Romania	Romanian	Added to cable in 2004
TV Rain	TV Rain	Netherlands	Russian
Vremya	National Media Group	Russia	Russian
Zee TV	Zee Entertainment Enterprises Limited	India	Hindi

== Former channels ==
Channel name	Owner/parent company	Period on air	Cause of closure
AGN Anime Channel	Assis Global Networks/SPI International	2004-2008	Unknown
AXN	Spike Communications	2000-2008	Lack of contractual renewal
Blue	Yes	2000-2004	Replaced by a foreign softcore channel
Briza	Yes	2000-2004	Restructuring of Yes's in-house channels
Channel 1	Israeli Broadcasting Authority	1968-2017	Shutdown of the IBA; replaced by Kan 11
Channel 2	Second Authority for Television and Radio	1993-2017	Shut down and replaced by Keshet 12 and Reshet 13
Channel 10/14	Second Authority for Television and Radio	2002-2019	Shut down; news operation merged with Reshet and LCN later taken over by Now 14
Channel 33	Israeli Broadcasting Authority	1994-2017	Shutdown of the IBA; replaced by Makan 33
Viva Platina	Dori Media Group	2001-2011	Replaced by Viva Plus
Zone Reality (Israel)	AMC Networks	1999-2025	Unknown

== See also ==
- Television in Israel
- i24news
