= Logi (TV channel) =

- Country: Israel
- Broadcast area: Nationwide
- Headquarters: Tel Aviv, Israel

Programming
- Language: Hebrew
- Picture format: 576i SDTV

Ownership
- Owner: NOGA Communications; RGE Group
- Sister channels: FOMO; HOT; HOT Buzz; Knesset Channel; Arutz HaYeladim; Sports Channel; Vamos; Yoyo

History
- Launched: August 17, 2003; 23 years ago

Links
- Website: www.logitv.co.il

Logi (Hebrew: לוגי), is an Israeli children's cable television channel owned by RGE Group, through subsidiary NOGA Communications Limited. It specializes primarily in scientific and educational content aimed at children and teenagers.

== History ==
On August 14, 2003, the cable companies (in the process of merging to form HOT) announced the launch of a new channel from Noga Communications for August 17. The channel was set to provide educational content aiming primarily at the 6-12 demographic, which is the prime demographic of its sister channel Arutz HaYeladim. Logi was made available on channel 7 of the digital platform, which was set to be occupied by a news channel, which ultimately never launched. The slot also coincided with Arutz HaYeladim and Channel 8, enabling Noga to have three consecutive channels on cable line-ups. The channel broadcast between 6am and 8pm and was available as part of the enhanced children's package. 80% of the content was in the Hebrew language with a substantial amount of local programming dedicated to the Israeli cultural landscape, such as the language, places in Israel and Israeli inventions. Foreign programs in Hebrew were also part of the schedule, mainly documentaries, as well as an evening slot for families. Among its launch programming was original program Two Experts and a Fool hosted by Shai Avivi and reruns of the French educational series Once Upon a Time..., first broadcast by IETV. In total, Noga Communications would broadcast 250 hours of new content a year, of which 150 hours were in Hebrew. By 2005, the channel was struggling to acquire new content, due to the failure of finding "balanced" educational content for the channel's content mandate. In September that year, Logi premiered the Noga-produced Just a Minute (לוגיקון), a series of interstitial segments about the history of topics ranging from science to fast-food. The series of interstitials had been acquired to foreign broadcasters by then. As of June 2005, the series had the ambition of having hundreds of episodes, with two seasons of 26 episodes each being finished and a third season in pre-production. The series was produced with Pil Animation.

On July 18, 2007, the channel announced that it would start broadcasting on the Yes satellite platform on channel 48 from August 1. By then, the channel was broadcasting from 6am to 9:30pm; ending at 10:30pm on holidays. Original content at the time included The Logicons, a series of two-minute shorts on basic concepts of various fields, and Ma Shlomo?, a period comedy series combining Biblical characters (centered on King Solomon portrayed by actor Avi Greinik).

In September 7, 2009, Logi adopted a new logo inspired by the speech bubble from Arutz HaYeladim, making it a thought bubble, under the concept of childhood curiosity conveyed in its programming.

RGE suspended the broadcast of its two children's channels on Yes on January 1, 2017, due to a carriage conflict. To fill the void, the owner of Hop! launched WIZ!, a channel with the same profile as Logi. HOT later lost the channel on January 1, 2018, making the channel exclusive to Cellcom TV and Partner TV. HOT filled the void with new channels created by Haim Slutsky. On December 26, 2019, Logi's original productions were made available on Yes STORE's VOD service. The channel resumed broadcasting on linear and VOD on HOT on February 20, 2023, after a new agreement with RGE.
