= Nili Tal =

Israeli film director and producer (1944–2024)

- נילי טל
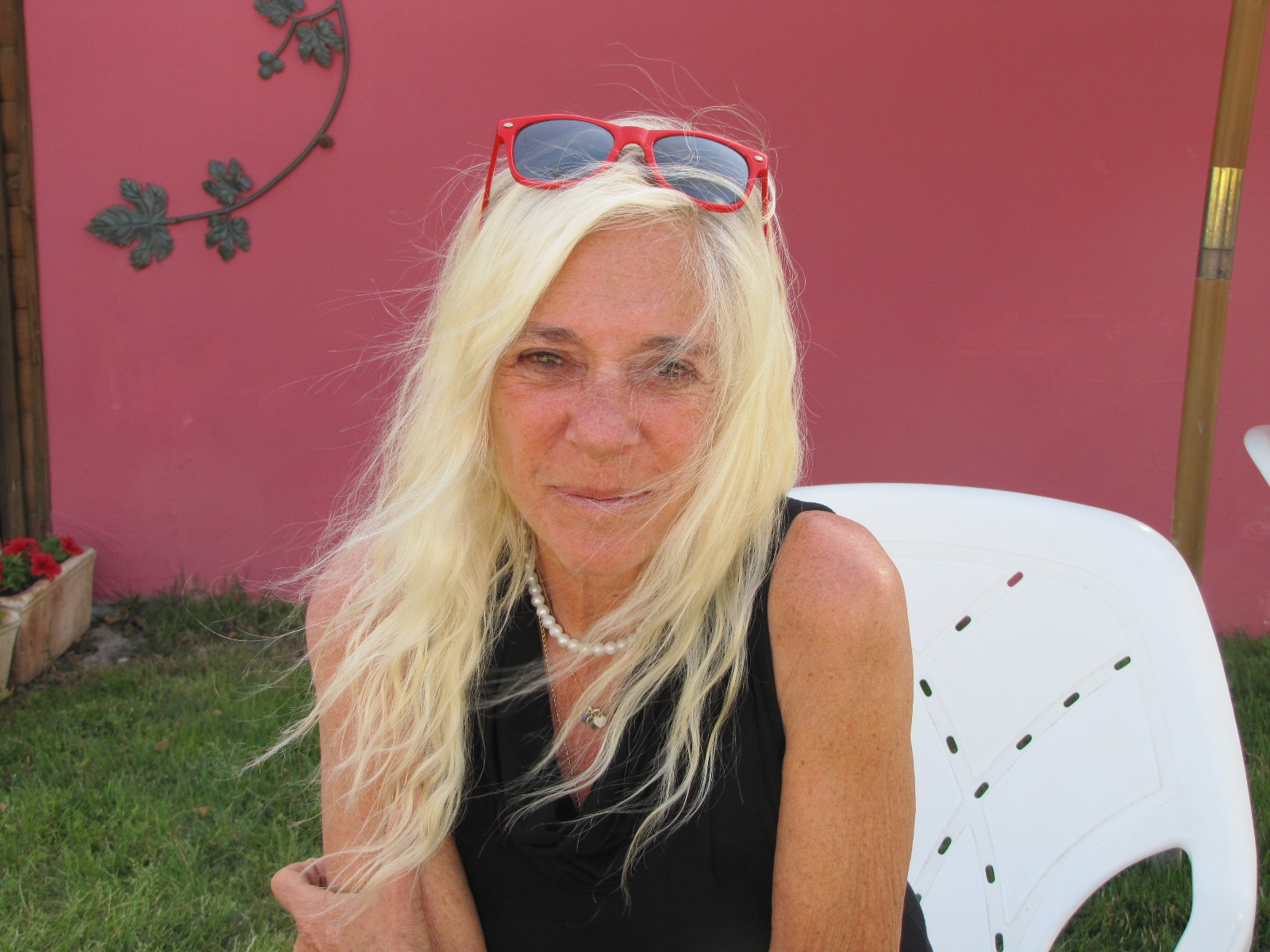
- Tal in 2011
- Born: Nili Herman; 15 January 1944; Tel Aviv, Mandatory Palestine
- Died: 7 March 2024 (aged 80); Tel Aviv, Israel
- Occupations: Journalist, documentary film director and producer
- Years active: 1965–2024
- Spouse: Yaakov Tal (1966–1990; divorced)

Nili Tal (Hebrew: נילי טל, née Herman; 15 January 1944 – 7 March 2024) was an Israeli journalist and documentary film director and producer. Her great-grandfather was Sigmund Weinberg, a pioneer of Turkish cinema.

In December 2022, Tal received a Lifetime Achievement Award from the Israeli Documentary Filmmakers Forum and in May 2023 she received a similar award from the Ministry of Culture and Sport (Israel).

She died on 7 March 2024, at the age of 80.

== Career ==
=== Journalism ===
Tal began her journalism career at the Israeli Haaretz daily newspaper in 1965, where she spent ten years. She also contributed as a freelancer to Yedioth Ahronoth and Maariv. She then moved into the television industry and began to work for the Israeli Broadcasting Authority, the sole television network in Israel at the time. She was one of the directors of Mabat Sheni (מבט שני; "Second Look") a current affairs program.

=== Documentaries ===
In her 1984 documentary Eyal, she interviewed a narcotics addict. It was the first time a scene of injecting street drugs was shown on TV in Israel, which brought the problematic issue of drug use into public debate.

Sixty and the City depicts Tal's two-year search for love over the internet. She made Ukraine Brides in 2000 and a sequel, Ukraine Brides 8 Years Later in 2009. The Girls from Brazil (2006–2007) depicts her trip to Brazil with four young Israelis searching for their birth mothers. Till Death Do Us Part (1998) documents the murder of Einav Rogel on Kibbutz Sha'ar HaGolan. Murder without a Motive explores the murder of Asaf Steierman. Bruna is a follow-up on the Brazilian baby girl who was adopted by an Israeli couple and returned to her birth mother by the courts at the age of two.

== Filmography ==
- My Lover, the Clock Thief (2023) – Commissioned by Yes
- The Rise and Fall of Inbal Or (2020) – Commissioned by Yes
- True Crime (2018) – Commissioned by Yes
- Saving Nur (2016) – Commissioned by Channel 1
- Etched In My Body (2015) – Commissioned by Yes
- Ukraine Bride – 13 Years Later (2013) – Commissioned by Yes
- Anna My Love (2012) – Commissioned by Yes
- Who Killed Baby Rose? (2011) – Commissioned by Reshet
- Sixty and The City (2010) – Commissioned by Yes
- Ukraine Brides – 8 Years Later (2009) – Commissioned by Yes
- Bruna (2008) – Commissioned by Keshet. Tel Aviv International Documentary Film Festival 2008 (DocAviv), It's All True Film Festival 2008, Brazil, International Women's Film Festival 2008, Rehovot
- The Girls from Brazil (2006–2007) – Commissioned by Yes. Tel Aviv International Documentary Film Festival 2007 (DocAviv), São Paulo International Film Festival 2007, Docupolis International Documentary Film Festival of Barcelona 2007, Amsterdam Jewish Film Festival 2007, Austin Jewish Film Festival 2008, and Washington Jewish Film Festival 2008.
- A Line and a Half (2006) – Commissioned by Channel 10
- Missing in LA (2006) – Commissioned by Hot
- Women for Sale (2005) – Commissioned by Hot. Tel Aviv International Documentary Film Festival 2005 (DocAviv)
- Murder Without a Motive (2003) – Commissioned by Hot, Reshet. Tel Aviv International Documentary Film Festival 2003 (DocAviv)
- Ukraine Brides (Part I and II) (2000–2001) – Commissioned by Reshet. Tel Aviv International Documentary Film Festival 2001 (DocAviv)
- The Bridge (2000) – Commissioned by Hot. Winner, Best Documentary, Tel Aviv International Documentary Film Festival 1999 (DocAviv)
- Shall We Dance? (1999) – Commissioned by Channel 2
- Till Death Do Us Part (1998) – Commissioned by Hot
- Flying Alone (1995) – Commissioned by Channel 1
- Acapulco Connection (1995) – Commissioned by Channel 1
- Eyal (1984) – Commissioned by Channel 1
