= Yes Stars HD =

yes stars HD
- Country: Israel

Ownership
- Owner: yes (Israel's satellite television provider)

History
- Launched: March 25, 2008
- Closed: April 21, 2009

Yes Stars HD (styled as yes stars HD) is an Israeli high definition television channel carried by the Israeli satellite television provider yes, which broadcasts American television shows. The channel aired on March 25, 2008 and part of it simulcasted with yes stars 1 and yes stars 2 on selected shows. The rest of the broadcasts are of shows previously broadcast only in standard definition, but now also in HD.

The channel aired as part of yes re-branding the television shows' channels on March 14, 2008 and now the yes stars group of channels is formed from yes stars 1, yes stars 2, yes stars 3, yes stars Israeli and yes stars HD.

On December 14, 2008, as part of a new re-brand of yes television shows channels, yes stars HD obtained a new logo and now simulcast shows from yes stars Action, yes stars Drama and yes stars Comedy. The channel aired on channel 501 until April 6, 2009, then the channel moved to channel 994 and on the end of the broadcast day of April 21, 2009 it was cancelled.

As of April 22, 2009, there are two HD shows channels: yes stars Drama HD on channel 993 and yes stars Action HD on channel 994.

The logo of yes stars HD from March 25, 2008 and until December 13, 2008.

== Broadcasting format ==
- yes stars HD was available only to the HD consumers of yes, using yes' HD set-top box.
- The broadcasting system is DVB-S2.
- Shows were broadcast in an original aspect ratio of 16:9 (widescreen).
- The shows were broadcast in a resolution of 1080i50.
- The shows were being compressed using H.264 compression format.
- Supported contents should also be broadcast in 5.1 channels of Dolby Digital surround sound, but instead it broadcast in 2.0 channels of Dolby Digital.
- There was also support for contents in a resolution of 720p.

== Shows broadcast on yes stars HD ==
Series	Season	Network
30 Rock	1-2	NBC
Army Wives	1-2	Lifetime
Battlestar Galactica	1-2	Sci Fi
Big Love	1-2	HBO
Cold Case	2-4	CBS
Criminal Justice	1	BBC One
Criminal Minds	1-3	CBS
Desperate Housewives	1-4	ABC
Dexter	3	Showtime
Dirt	2	FX Networks
Dirty Sexy Money	1	ABC
Eli Stone	1	ABC
Entourage	3	HBO
Friday Night Lights	1-2	NBC
Generation Kill	1	HBO
Ghost Whisperer	3	CBS
Grey's Anatomy	1-4	ABC
Heroes	1-2	NBC
In Plain Sight	1	USA Network
Law & Order: Special Victims Unit	4	NBC
Little Britain USA	1	HBO
Meadowlands	1	Showtime
One Tree Hill	5	The CW
Private Practice	1	ABC
Pushing Daisies	1	ABC
Reaper	1	The CW
Samantha Who?	1	ABC
Secret Diary of a Call Girl	2	ITV2
Smallville	7	The CW
Supernatural	1,3	The CW
The Closer	1-4	TNT
The Kill Point	1	Spike
The Lost Room	Miniseries	Sci Fi Channel
The Starter Wife	Miniseries	USA Network
The Tudors	1-2	Showtime
Tin Man	Miniseries	Sci Fi
True Blood	1	HBO
Weeds	1-2,4	Showtime
