= Noga Communications =

Israeli television producer

Noga Communications (Hebrew: נגה תקשורת, Noga Tikshoret) is an Israeli television production company, owned by RGE Group, mainly specializing in the production of television channels and programs for children.

== History ==
Noga was created in September 1996 after a law was passed in Knesset to disband Israel Cable Programming's control over Arutz HaYeladim and Channel 8. The "ICP Agreement" established that the cable companies would only control 40% of the in-house channels. It started distributing content from The History Channel in August 1997. Thanks to a supply agreement with ZDTV, its subsidiary Ananey Communications (currently owned by Paramount Global) launched The Internet and Hi-Tech Channel in July 2000.

Matav, Tevel and Golden Channels announced that they would cut their production agreements with Arutz HaYeladim and Channel 8 on May 14, 2000, following the expiration of the ICP agreement in September 1999. If Noga shut down the two channels on cable companies, it would cause a substantial adverse effect on its activities. Filmmaker Aviv Giladi bought Noga Communications for US$3.8 million on November 26, 2000. Before then, Taya owned 50% and Ananey owned the other half. The company spent NIS 30 million in 2000 buying content from international suppliers for channels 6 and 8. Giladi also bought the rights to Arutz HaYeladim's website, which at the time was one of the most popular Israeli websites by viewcount. The company was obliged to produce original content in January 2002, for the sum of US$2,5 million. This came after Channel 8 did not invest the whole value allocated for original productions. As part of the agreement, the company would use US$1 million for potential production partners until June.

The company attempted to compete for part of the joint ownership of Channel 2 using a subsidiary named Noga 2 in 2004. The company during bidding planned to use Channel 2's logo attached to the name, but had to change it due to trademark concerns with the Second Authority for Radio and Television. Keshet and Reshet won the bid in April 2005.

The company became a subsidiary of the RGE Group in the late 2000s and executives have been trading their positions between the subsidiary and the parent on a regular basis. The company announced in late 2009 that it would create a third children's channel catering to viewers between the ages of 10 and 14, targeting a demographic dominated by the Disney Channel. RGE was planning the move of its playout and studio facilities to a single building in Herzliya. Facing the deterioration of children's programming in Israel, the company hired returnee Healy Horev-Kasuto in March 2021, who had previously administered the Logi channel. Ou Ram was named its CEO on November 23, 2010.

The company launched an over-the-top streaming platform in September 2020, called BIGI, in the wake of the removal of Arutz HaYeladim and Logi from Yes and HOT. RGE and HOT brought back the Noga brands to the platform on February 20, 2023, after the two companies signed a new agreement.

== Productions ==
The company has produced many programs, including The Island, The Eight, HaPijamot, Adomot, HaBigbagim, HaChevre HaTovim and Children of the Red Sea, for Arutz HaYeladim.
