= Disney Jr. (Israel) =

Cable channel for children

- New logo used since 1 June 2024
- Country: Israel
- Broadcast area: Nationwide
- Headquarters: Ramat Gan

Programming
- Languages: English; Hebrew; Russian
- Picture format: 576i SDTV

Ownership
- Owner: The Walt Disney Company Israel
- Sister channels: Disney Channel

History
- Launched: 18 July 2011; 15 years ago
- Former names: Playhouse Disney (2009-2011)

Links
- Website: tv.disney.co.il

Disney Jr. is an Israeli-language television channel owned by the EMEA division of the Walt Disney Company and launched on 18 July 2011 on the Yes satellite television platform. and on 27 November 2013 on HOT Cable. Its programming is aimed at young children and their parents.

== Logos ==
2019-2024

2024-present
