= Disney Channel (Israel) =

Israeli feed of Disney Channel

- Logo used since 1 July 2022
- Country: Israel
- Broadcast area: Nationwide
- Headquarters: Ramat Gan

Programming
- Languages: English; Hebrew (dubbing/subtitles)
- Picture format: HDTV 1080p; SDTV 576i, 16:9

Ownership
- Owner: The Walt Disney Company Israel; Disney Kids & Family (Disney Entertainment)
- Sister channels: Disney Jr.

History
- Launched: February 2001; 25 years ago (as Fox Kids); March 2005; 21 years ago (as Jetix); 9 September 2009; 17 years ago (as Disney Channel)
- Former names: Fox Kids (2001–2005); Jetix (2005–2009)

Links
- Website: tv.disney.co.il

Disney Channel (Hebrew: ערוץ דיסני, romanized: 'Aroots dysny) is an Israeli children's television channel owned by Disney International Operations broadcast to Israeli audiences. It was previously known as Fox Kids and Jetix. It launched in its current form on 9 September 2009.

== History ==
Fox Kids began broadcasting in Israel in February 2001, initially operating as a joint venture between Fox Kids Europe and Middle East Communication Holdings B.V., the latter of which held the distribution rights to the Saban Entertainment catalogue in Israeli territories. The first company to carry the channel was Golden Channels, with an April 1 launch date, and, as of January 2001, was waiting for negotiations with Matav and satellite company Yes. The channel initially broadcast from 6am to 6pm and had its playout at the Meimad Television Studios. In June 2003, Fox Kids Europe took full control of both the network and the Saban catalogue.

Fox Kids was later rebranded to Jetix in March 2005.

On 9 September 2009, Jetix was replaced with Disney Channel. Disney Channel mainly aired programming from its US counterpart, as well as local content such as Balagan. In 2011, its sister, Disney Jr., was launched on Yes, and later on HOT on 27 November 2013.

== Logos ==
2001–2005

2009–2011

2011–2014

2014–2017

2017–2022

2022–present
