= Yes Base =

Yes Stars Base
- Yes Stars Base intertitle
- Country: Israel

Programming
- Picture format: 576i (SDTV 16:9, 4:3); 1080i (HDTV)

Ownership
- Owner: Yes (Israel's satellite television provider)

History
- Launched: December 14, 2008
- Former names: Yes Stars 3 (2007-2008)

Yes Stars Base (styled as Yes Stars Base) is an Israeli television channel carried by the Israeli satellite television provider - Yes, which broadcasts American and British TV shows joint with Hot's channel HOT3 before it was moved to Hot Family. The channel aired on December 14, 2008, on channel 15 - as part of the latest television shows' channels re-brand by Yes. The channel replaced the former Yes Stars 3. Shows like The Life and Times of Vivienne Vyle and Kyle XY are broadcast on this channel.

In December 2009, Yes Base moved to channel 16 toward the re-brand of Yes Stars 2010 channels.

On November 4, 2015, yes Base ceased operations.

== Picture Formats ==
Yes Stars Base airs shows in four formats:

- Normal (4:3)
- Letterboxed (4:3)
- Pan & Scan (4:3)
- Widescreen (16:9)

In order to watch widescreen (16:9) shows on a 4:3 TV, there are three options for viewing the picture:

- 4:3 Letterbox (Widescreen with black bars - Original Aspect Ratio)
- 16:9 (Anamorphic Widescreen)
- 4:3 (Pan & scan)

Choosing the format of the picture is in the digital set-top box setup. The setup does not affect shows not broadcast in Widescreen.

== History of the channel ==
The logo of yes stars 3 from March 4, 2007 and until March 13, 2008.

On March 4, 2007, yes replaced the channel Channel 3 of yes - which was actually Channel 3 and has been cancelled on March 3 - with yes stars 3, as part of the re-brand of the foreign TV shows channels and expanding yes stars to 3 channels - yes stars 1, yes stars 2 and yes stars 3.

The logo of yes stars 3 from March 14, 2008 and until December 13, 2008.

On March 14, 2008, as part of a new re-brand of the television shows channels on yes, yes stars 3 obtained a new logo.
