= AGN Anime Channel =

- Country: Israel
- Broadcast area: Israel

Programming
- Language: Hebrew

Ownership
- Owner: Assis Global Networks; SPI International

History
- Launched: 29 November 2004; 21 years ago
- Closed: 1 January 2008; 18 years ago

AGN Anime Channel (ערוץ אנימה) was an Israeli channel operated by Assis Global Networks, in co-operation with SPI International, specialized an anime series and movies. The channel was packaged to HOT and Yes as HOT Anime and Yes Anime respectively.

== History ==
In August 2004, Yes announced the introduction of several new channels, among them an anime channel. Broadcasts started on 29 November 2004. It was available as a free preview for a month; the channel was included in the movie package. Launch titles included Generator Gawl and Kino's Journey. The number of titles was initially low, but grew over time. This also coincided with the rise of anime titles having theatrical releases, limited to movies from the Pokémon franchise and Hayao Miyazaki's productions.

The channel ceased operations in 2008.
