= RGE Group =

Israeli media company

RGE Group Ltd.
- Formerly: Aviv Giladi Holdings; United Media Group
- Industry: Media
- Founded: March 10, 1999; 26 years ago
- Headquarters: Herzliya, Israel
- Key people: Shai Recanati (chairman); Or Ram (2016-2023) and Yaron Segev (2016-) (CEOs)
- Owner: Naftali Group (75%); Keshet Media Group (25%)
- Website: rge.co.il

RGE Group (abbreviated from Recanati Giladi Entertainment, previously known as Aviv Giladi Holdings and United Media Group or UMG) is an Israeli media company that owns several television channels. The company is owned by the Recanati family through the Naftali Group, with the Keshet Media Group holding a 25% minority stake.

The company operates out of a complex in western Herzliya.

== History ==
Recanati Giladi Entertainment, initially known as Aviv Giladi Holdings or United Media Group (UMG), was established on 10 March 1999. At the time, Giladi held a 25% stake in JCS Sports, which ran the Sports Channel, and a 2.5% stake in Taya Communications, which owned Noga Communications. On 26 August 1999, Giladi purchased a 25% stake in Ananey Communications.

On 26 November 2000, Giladi purchased Noga Communications for US$3.8 million. On 29 June 2004, Avgal Media and Communications, another one of Giladi's companies, was merged into UMG. The next day, Udi Recanati, formerly a shareholder in an Israeli investment firm, purchased a 20% stake in UMG for US$3.2 million.

On 22 March 2004, UMG bought a majority share in JCS Sports, before becoming the company's sole shareholder on 29 November 2006.

On 27 September 2004, Giladi and Recanati announced that Noga Communications would seek a franchise over channel 2 under the name Noga 2. On 10 November, Noga 2's bid was merged with that of Reshet, with Giladi and Recanati buying Yedioth Ahronoth's stake in Reshet. On 13 April 2005, Reshet and Noga's joint bid was chosen, alongside Keshet Media Group, to manage channel 2.

On 20 September 2006, UMG was renamed RGE, short for Recanati Giladi Entertainment, after its two owners.

On 17 June 2008, Russian billionaire Len Blavatnik purchased a 20% stake in RGE, through Access Industries. In 2010, Access Industries increased its ownership from 20% to 33%.

On 25 April 2010, RGE sold its shares in Reshet to Fular communications for 1ILS.

In December 2012, HOT decided to end Noga's franchise over Channel 8, which was instead given to Haim Sloski Productions.

In May 2015, RGE purchased a 51% stake in Channel 10. In 2016, Or Ram and Yaron Segev became RGE's CEOs, with their appointment becoming official in Late 2018.

On 1 February 2017, RGE submitted a bid to the Cable and Satellite Broadcasting Council for the right to operate the Knesset Channel. On 4 May, the council announced that it would award the right to operate the channel to Channel 20, before disqualifying its bid in December due to issues with the bid's finances. On 31 May 2018, the Council chose to accept RGE's bid instead. RGE took over management of the channel from Hevrat HaHadashot on 1 August.

On 4 July 2018, Channel 10 signed a merger agreement with Channel 13. The merger went into effect on 16 January 2019.

In October 2019, Aviv Giladi sold his shares in RGE to Len Blavatnik, leading to Blavatnik and the Recanati family owning equal stakes in the company. On 24 January 2021, the Recanati family bought Blavatnik's shares in the company. Blavatnik retained his shares in Channel 13, which became separate from RGE.

On 18 March 2021, Keshet announced its intention to buy a 49% stake in RGE and develop a joint streaming service with the company. On 2 September, the Israel Competition Authority approved the development of a joint streaming service, but only allowed Keshet to purchase a 25% stake in RGE. On 14 February 2022, the streaming service's name was revealed to be FreeTV. On 20 March, RGE announced that FreeTV will cooperate with Partner Communications Company.

In April 2021, RGE subsidiary Noga Communications partnered with Candle Media subsidiary, UK-based Moonbug Entertainment to launch its Moonbug Kids channel on RGE's on-demand platform BIGI.

In July 2023, Or Ram announced his retirement, leaving Yaron Segev as the company's sole CEO.

== Owned channels ==
- Knesset Channel (since 1 August 2018)
- Sports Channel
- Arutz HaYeladim (through Noga Communications)
- Logi (through Noga Communications)
- HOT Buzz (through Noga Communications)
- Yoyo Channel (through Noga Communications)
- FOMO Channel (through Noga Communications)
- Vamos channel (telenovelas; profile similar to Viva)

== Formerly owned channels ==
- Channel 13 (co-owned with Reshet)
- Channel 10
- Channel 8 (until late December 2012)
- The Hero Channel

== See also ==
- Yedioth Ahronoth
- Maariv
- Haaretz
- Israeli Public Broadcasting Corporation
- Telad
- Dori Media Group
