= AXN (Israeli TV channel) =

- Country: Israel
- Broadcast area: Israel

Programming
- Picture format: 4:3 SDTV

Ownership
- Owner: Spike Communications (Sony Pictures Television)

History
- Launched: 16 November 2000; 25 years ago
- Closed: 2009; 17 years ago

AXN was an Israeli pay television channel and the local version of the AXN network owned by Sony. It operated from 2000 until 2009, when it shut down after HOT and Sony failed to renew their agreement. Following its closure, Spike Communications—then owned by Dori Media—continued supplying content for a replacement channel on HOT.

== History ==
The channel was announced in October 2000 and started broadcasting on November 16 that year. At the time of announcing, the channel claimed to have agreements with the three cable companies, but only had negotiations with Matav for its launch. The other companies (Tevel and Golden Channels) could not broadcast it due to apparent "technical limitations". Matav had recently expanded its spectrum from 550 to 860 MHz, meaning that it had the ability to add new channels before starting regular digital services.

The Israeli licensee was Spike, a company led by Claire Elbaz and Adi Sofer. Columbia Tristar Television International supplied the branding, but only 12% of the programming. It was set to run on a 16-hour schedule, starting at 12:00 pm and ending at 4:00 am. From 10:00 pm to closedown, three action movies were shown. The channel also aired extreme sports-related programming, the first of which was the 2000 ECO Challenge, which AXN had the worldwide rights to.

The Antitrust Committee decided not to exempt the restrictions given to the cable companies and suggested a clause for Yes to carry the channel, which would affect AXN's finances. Another restriction prevented the companies from having a similar channel on their basic packages.

In January 2002, the channel had a median audience share of 2,7%, in sixth place among independent cable channels (excluding channels owned by the cable companies). In April 2002, the channel started airing Mutant X and Seven Days. AXN started its 2004 season of programming on February 13, with eleven new seasons of its popular programming. This also included a content agreement with 20th Century Fox Television to carry series such as The X-Files, to which AXN already had the rights to repeats of the first three seasons (the channel aimed to acquire the remaining seasons).

In June 2008, negotiations between SPTI and HOT proved fruitless, causing AXN Israel's shutdown, initially scheduled for mid-November. Within days, HOT announced its replacement channel, HOT XTRA ACTION, produced by Dori Media Spike. Bip took over its former slot (channel 6).
