= Yes Drama =

Israeli television channel

yes Drama
- yes Drama intertitle
- Country: Israel

Programming
- Languages: Hebrew; English
- Picture format: 576i (SDTV 16:9, 4:3); 1080i (HDTV)

Ownership
- Owner: yes (Israel's satellite television provider)
- Sister channels: yes Action HD yes Comedy HD yes Oh HD yes EDGE

History
- Launched: December 14, 2008
- Former names: yes stars 1 (2007-2008) yes stars Drama (2008-2010)

Yes Drama (styled as yes Drama and formerly called yes stars Drama) is an Israeli television channel carried by the Israeli satellite television provider yes, which broadcasts American, British, Canadian and Israeli TV shows of the drama, lifestyle and reality genres. The channel aired on December 14, 2008 on channel 12 as part of the latest television shows' channels re-brand by yes. The channel is a split of the former yes stars 1 to the current yes Drama and yes Comedy. The channel airs the shows' new episodes on weeknights (Sundays - Thursdays), and its re-runs on weekdays and weekends (Fridays - Saturdays).

The yes Drama schedule is being simulcast in High Definition on yes Drama HD on channel 16.

== Picture Formats ==
yes Drama airs shows in 4 formats:

- Normal (4:3)
- Letterboxed (4:3)
- Pan & Scan (4:3)
- Widescreen (16:9)

In order to watch widescreen (16:9) shows on a 4:3 TV, there are 3 options to choose from:

- 4:3 Letterbox (Widescreen with black bars - Original Aspect Ratio)
- 16:9 (Anamorphic Widescreen)
- 4:3 (Pan & scan)

Choosing the format of the picture is in the digital set-top box setup. The setup does not affect shows which are not broadcast in Widescreen.

yes Drama HD airs the shows in High Definition 1080i and in widescreen (16:9) at all times. Shows that are not shot in HD are upscaled to 1080i.

== History of the channel ==
The past logos of yes Drama (From left to right): yes stars 1 - from March 4, 2007 and until March 13, 2008. yes stars 1 - from March 14, 2008 and until December 13, 2008. yes stars Drama - from December 14, 2008 and until August 19, 2010. yes Drama - From August 20, 2010 and until January 20, 2012.

On March 4, 2007, yes replaced the channel yes+ - which has been cancelled on March 3, 2007 after six and a half years - with yes stars 1, as part of the re-brand of the foreign TV shows channels and expanding yesSTARS to 3 channels - yes stars 1, yes stars 2 and yes stars 3.

On March 14, 2008, as part of a new re-brand of the television shows channels on yes, yes stars 1 obtained a new logo.

On December 14, 2008, as part of another re-brand of the channels, yes stars 1 was replaced with yes stars Drama, and as of April 22, 2009 simulcast its entire schedule in High Definition on yes stars Drama HD, replacing Yes Stars HD, which aired most of the channel's shows in HD.

On August 20, 2010, the word stars was removed from the channel name.

== Shows broadcast on yes Drama ==
Series	Season	Broadcast Type	Network
10 Things I Hate About You (TV series)	1	Widescreen	ABC Family
90210	3-	Widescreen	The CW
America's Most Smartest Model	1	Normal	VH1
American Princess	2	Normal	WE
Army Wives	1-2	Widescreen	Lifetime
Beautiful People	1 (UK)	Widescreen	BBC Two
Big Love	1-2	Widescreen	HBO
Bonkers	1	Widescreen	ITV
Bridezillas	5	Normal	WE
Cougar Town	1-4	Normal	TBS
Crash	1	Widescreen	Starz
Desperate Housewives	3; 4-5	Pan & Scan; Widescreen	ABC
Dirty Sexy Money	1-2	Widescreen	ABC
Dirt	1-2	Widescreen	FX
Drop Dead Gorgeous	1-2	Widescreen	BBC Three
Eastbound & Down	1	Widescreen	HBO
Echo Beach	1	Widescreen	ITV
Eli Stone	1-2	Widescreen	ABC
Extreme Makeover: Home Edition	1-3	Normal	ABC
Fairy Tales	1	Widescreen	BBC One
Fat March	1	Normal	ABC
Flavor of Love	2	Normal	VH1
Charm School	1	Normal	VH1
Friday Night Lights	1-2	Widescreen	NBC
Gillian Moves In	1	Widescreen	Channel 4
Grey's Anatomy	1-3; 4-5	Pan & Scan; Widescreen	ABC
Glee	1-2	Widescreen	FOX
Heartland	1-7	Widescreen	CBC
Hell's Kitchen	1-3; 4-5	Pan & Scan; Widescreen	Fox
How To Make It In America	1-	Widescreen	HBO
How to Look Good Naked	1	Widescreen	Channel 4
I Love New York	1	Normal	VH1
Kitchen Nightmares	1	Widescreen	Fox
Lipstick Jungle	1	Widescreen	NBC
Melrose Place (2009 TV series)	1	Widescreen	The CW
Moving Wallpaper	1	Widescreen	ITV
Mutual Friends	1	Widescreen	BBC One
Nanny 911	3	Normal	Fox
Nip/Tuck	1-6	Widescreen	FX Network
No Angels	3	Widescreen	Channel 4
One Tree Hill	1-2; 3-6	Pan & Scan; Widescreen	The WB/The CW
Plus One	1	Widescreen	Channel 4
PoweR Girls	1	Normal	MTV
Private Practice	1-2	Widescreen	ABC
Pushing Daisies	1-2	Widescreen	ABC
Ramsay's Kitchen Nightmares	1-3; 4	Pan & Scan; Widescreen	Channel 4
Rock Rivals	1	Widescreen	ITV
Secret Diary of a Call Girl	1-2	Widescreen	ITV2
Sensitive Skin	1-2	Widescreen	BBC Two
Side Order of Life	1	Widescreen	Lifetime
Six Feet Under	1-5	Widescreen	HBO
Skins	1-2	Widescreen	E4
Strictly Confidential	1	Widescreen	ITV
Studio 60 on the Sunset Strip	1	Widescreen	NBC
Supernanny	3-4 (UK); 3-4 (US)	Normal	Channel 4 ABC
The Bachelor	9-13	Normal	ABC
The Bachelorette	4	Normal	ABC
The Biggest Loser	3-4	Normal	NBC
The Chase	1-2	Widescreen	BBC One
The L Word	4-6	Widescreen	Showtime
The O.C.	4	Widescreen	Fox
The Palace	1	Widescreen	BBC One
The Good Wife	1-present	Widescreen	CBS</
The Starter Wife	Miniseries	Widescreen	USA Network
Tori & Dean: Inn Love	1	Widescreen	Oxygen
Twisted	1	Normal	ABC Family
Weeds	1-4	Widescreen	Showtime
Wife Swap	5-7	Normal	ABC
