= Sports Channel (Israel) =

Israeli sports television service

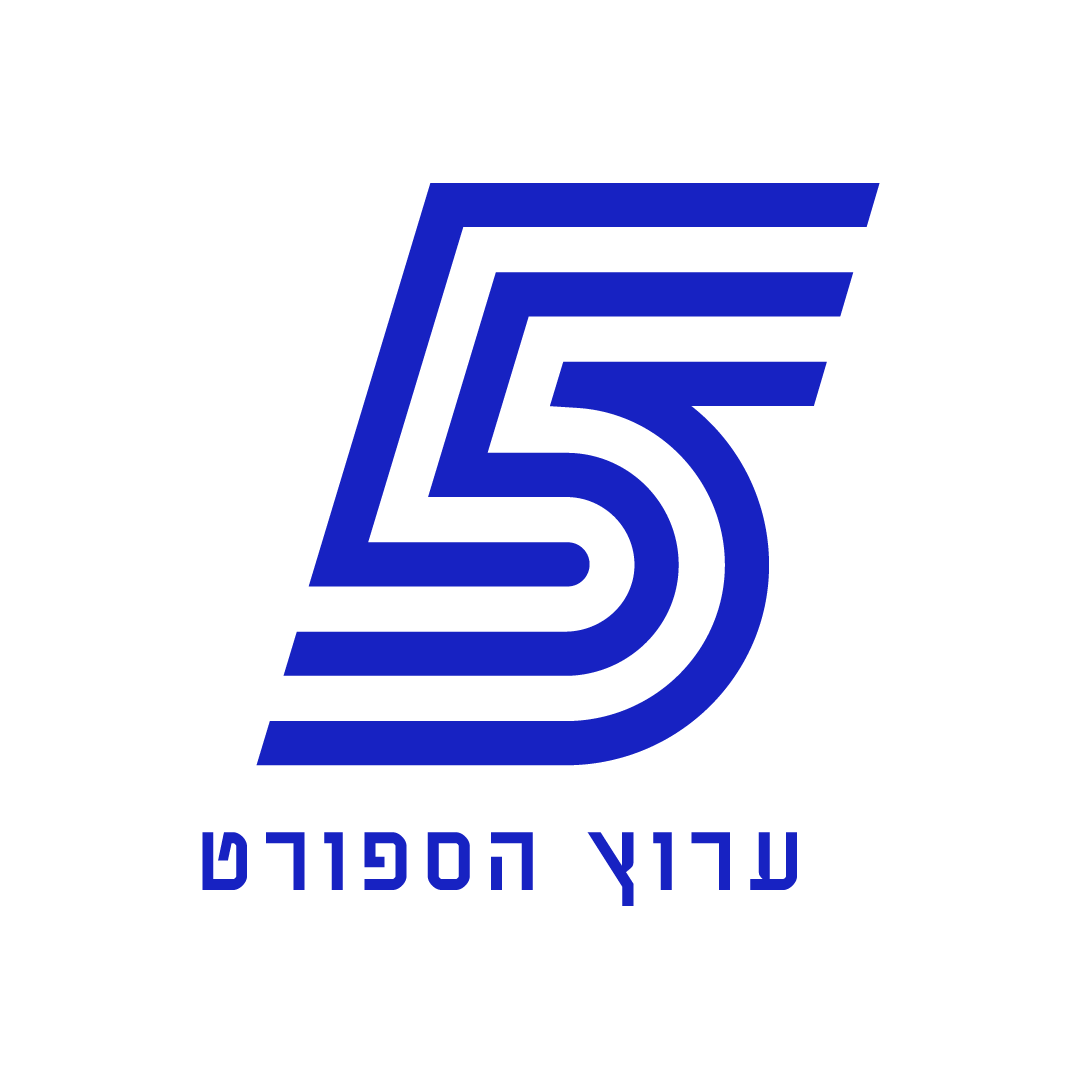
- Country: Israel

Ownership
- Owner: RGE Group
- Sister channels: Arutz HaYeladim; Knesset Channel; Logi TV; Vamos

Links
- Website: Sport5.co.il

Sports Channel (Hebrew: ערוץ הספורט, Arutz HaSport), also known as the Sport 5 (Hebrew: ספורט 5, Sport Hamesh), is one of the major Israeli television company and sports journalism outlet owned by RGE Group. Available on cable (via HOT) and satellite (via Yes); the company has six channels which are devoted to sports.

Old logo of the company

== Main and subsidiary channels ==
=== 5SPORT ===
In 1989, the channel first aired as the Sports Channel on channel 5, from whence its name is derived.

=== 5PLUS ===
In 2001, the subscription fee based channel 5PLUS was created as Sport 5's first subsidiary channel with content such as (cut down international versions of) WWE Raw and WWE Friday Night SmackDown. Since then, 5SPORT has lost almost all of its notable content, though it is still used to show UEFA Champions League matches in tandem with 5PLUS channel.

=== 5LIVE and 5GOLD ===
In March 2007, the company launched two new channels, 5LIVE (for live sport) and 5GOLD (repeats of classic sports action). The new channels were met with great criticism from viewers complaining about even more loss of content in favor of pay channels.

=== 5SPORT HD ===
On December 23, 2007, Sports Channel launched a Fifth channel – 5SPORT HD. The channel, aired UEFA Champions League, the NBA Playoff games and Wimbledon tournament.

In addition to current content, the channel also broadcast games from the 2008 Summer Olympics and 2012 Summer Olympics. Also, it was announced that starting next season the channel will introduce Formula One racing. 5SPORT HD is available for both Yes HD and HOT HD customers.

=== 5SPORT 3D ===
In April 2011, Sports Channel launched their sixth channel – 5SPORT 3D. The channel broadcast matches in 3D. In September 2011, the channel was shut down due to low demand.

=== 5STARS ===
On 8 October 2018, Sports Channel launched their seventh channel – 5STARS, as part of a major overhaul to the network. Unlike most of its sister channels, 5STARS was launched as a high-definition channel. It was followed by all its sister channels being handed an HD feed. The channel has been available to watch in most regions of the country via different pay-tv carriers.

=== 5SPORT 4K ===
Sports Channel launched their eighth channel – 5SPORT 4K, which broadcasts matches in 4K.

=== 5EURO2024 ===
Sports Channel launched their temporary channel – 5EURO2024. The channel who devoted to the screening of UEFA Euro 2024.

== Broadcasting rights ==
The company broadcast some games (only few in each)

- (Israel) Israeli Premier League (games 1, 6 and 7)
- Davis Cup
- Fed Cup
- Formula One
- (United Kingdom) Wimbledon
- (Europe) Euroleague Basketball
- (Europe) UEFA Champions League
- (Europe) UEFA Youth League
- (Europe) UEFA Futsal Champions League (final four only)
- (Israel) Israeli Basketball Super League
- (Israel) Israeli Basketball League Cup
- (Israel) Israeli Female Basketball Premier League
- (Israel) Israeli Handball Super League
- (Israel) Israeli Volleyball Super League
- (Israel) Liga Leumit
- (Israel) Liga Leumit Basketball League
- (Israel) Israeli Noar Leumit League
- (Israel) Toto Cup
- (Israel) Liga Alef
- (Scotland) Scottish Premiership
- (Scotland) Scottish Championship
- (Scotland) Scottish Cup
- (Scotland) Scottish League Cup
- (Austria) Austrian Football Bundesliga
- (Austria) Austrian Cup
- (France) Ligue 1
- (France) Ligue 2
- (United States) (Canada) MLB
- (United States) (Canada) NBA
- (United States) NFL
- (United States) (Canada) NHL
- (International Olympic Committee) The Olympic Games
- (Australia) (New Zealand) NBL
- (South Korea) K League 1
- AFC
