= Yes TV Shows Channels =

Israeli satellite TV channels

yes Series Channels
- yes TV Shows Channels in 2012.
- Country: Israel

Ownership
- Owner: yes (Israel's satellite television provider)

History
- Launched: December 14, 2008
- Former names: yesWeekend (2004-2006) yesSTARS (2006-2007) yes stars 123 (2007-2008)

Carried by the Israeli satellite television provider yes, yes TV Shows Channels (formerly stylized as yes stars) is an Israeli group of television channels which broadcasts American, British and Israeli television shows. As of April 5, 2016, it consists of four channels:

- yes Drama – It airs drama, lifestyle and reality shows. Airs in High Definition simulcast as yes Drama HD.
- yes Action – It airs Action shows. Airs in High Definition simulcast as yes Action HD.
- yes Oh – It airs shows of HBO and other shows from the rest of the American premium cable channels on weeknights. Airs in High Definition simulcast as yes Oh HD.
- yes Comedy – It airs sitcoms, comedy shows and dramedies. Airs in High Definition simulcast as yes Comedy HD.

yes Drama and yes Action air new episodes of shows on weeknights (Sundays – Thursdays). yes Comedy airs new episodes of shows in the weekends (Fridays and Saturdays). yes Oh airs new episodes on weeknights.

The channel yes Real was canceled on January 16, 2012 and replaced with yes Oh.

On November 4, 2015, yes Base was discontinued.

== History ==
=== Summer Nights ===
In 2003, yes aired a channel called Summer Nights, that featured shows in the nights of the summer of 2003. The channel was cancelled at the end of the summer.

=== yesREAL / yes stars real (2008) / yes stars Real (2009) ===
In the summer 2004, yes decided to air a channel called yesREAL, with reality shows, such as Survivor and The Amazing Race. Due to the success of the channel, yes ran this channel again.

yes returned to air the past channel under its new name yes stars real on July 13, 2008. The channel aired 13 reality and life style shows 24/7 and the shows aired in the same method of the regular stars channels with new episodes on weeknights (Sundays – Thursdays) and re-runs at the rest of the time. The channel went off air at the end of the broadcast day of September 13, 2008.

On May 26, 2009 yes announced the return of the reality shows channel – yes stars Real – on July 5, 2009 on channel 20. The channel aired the shows 24/7 in the same method of the regular stars channels with new episodes on weeknights (Sundays – Thursdays) and re-runs at the rest of the time. The channel went off air at the end of the broadcast day of August 29, 2009.

=== yesWeekend ===
On October 22, 2004, yes launched the channel yesWeekend, which broadcast American and British television shows from the beginning, in the weekends (From Thursday night at 22:00 until Sunday morning at 06:00). Later in the days, of yesWeekend, the channel moved to broadcast only on Fridays and Saturdays, and in the weeknights it carried the shows that already aired on yesWeekend in syndication. In the last two months of the channel, the channel began showing re-runs on weekdays of the shows broadcast in the weekend, as a pilot for yesSTARS. On March 4, 2006 yesWeekend was cancelled.

=== yesSTARS ===
Under a massive campaign under the name: The Revolution is Coming, which began on February 9, 2006, yes launched on March 5, 2006 yesSTARS, with new episodes of shows broadcast on yesWeekend, and new shows that began the 2005/6 season. The shows aired on weeknights (Sundays – Thursdays), and the re-runs of the shows were in the weekdays and the weekends (Fridays - Saturdays).

On January 16, 2007, it was promoted in print and digital media that yesSTARS will expand to 3 channels - yes stars 1, yes stars 2 and yes stars 3– on channels 12, 13 and 14 on yes. On February 11, 2007, yes launched an official promotional to the new group of channels stating the launch date to March 4, 2007. On March 3, 2007 yesSTARS has been cancelled. On March 4, 2007, the channel became yes stars 2.

=== yes stars 1, 2, 3 ===
As part of the television shows channels re-brand on yes, yesSTARS expanded to 3 channels on March 4, 2007:

- yes Stars 1 (channel 12) – The channel replaced the most veteran television shows channel on Yes - yes+ which aired between September 3, 2000 and March 3, 2007.
- yes Stars 2 (channel 13) – Replaced the original yesSTARS channel.
- yes Stars 3 (channel 14) – Replaced channel 3 which aired on channel 30 on yes.

The three channels carried the slogan – "To Fall in Love, to Get Devoted, to Get Addicted".

=== yes stars 2008 ===
On March 14, 2008, yes replaced the logos of yes stars 1, yes stars 2 and yes stars 3. In addition, the Israeli movies and television shows channel yesIsraeli became yes stars Israeli and moved to channel 15.

On March 25, 2008 the HD version of yes stars – yes stars HD aired. The channel airs selected shows from the yes stars channels in high definition.

On December 14, 2008 yes re-branded the channels again, and yes stars 1, yes stars 2 and yes stars 3 has been canceled.

=== New name and rebranding ===
As of December 14, 2008 - yes changed the channels to be consisted of five as follows:

- yes stars Drama (replaced yes stars 1) - Airs drama, lifestyle and reality shows. Airs in High Definition simulcast.
- yes stars Action (replaced yes stars 2) - Airs thrillers, sci-fi, action and competitive reality shows. Airs in High Definition simulcast.
- yes stars Comedy - Airs sitcoms, comedy shows and dramedies.
- yes stars Base (replaced yes stars 3) - Airs joint shows with Hot Family (of HOT).
- yes stars Israeli - Aired Israeli movies and TV shows of all genres.

=== Another new name ===
yes TV Shows Channels 2010

As of January 17, 2010 - yes changed the channels to be consisted of five channels as follows (As of August 20, 2010, the word "stars" was removed from the channels' name):

- yes Drama - Airs drama, lifestyle and reality shows. Airs in High Definition simulcast as yes Drama HD.
- yes Action - Airs thrillers, Sci-Fi and action shows. Airs in High Definition simulcast as yes Action HD.
- yes Comedy - Airs sitcoms, comedy shows and dramedies.
- yes Next - Airs shows from all genres which are pointing to the young demos. Airs in High Definition simulcast as yes Next HD.
- yes Base - Airs joint shows with Hot Family (of HOT).

The channel "yes stars Israeli" was canceled on January 16, 2010 and replaced with yes stars Next.

=== yes TV Shows Channels 2011 ===
yes TV Shows Channels 2011

as of January 15, 2011 - consists of five channels as follows.,

- yes Drama - Airs drama, lifestyle and reality shows. Airs in High Definition simulcast as yes Drama HD.
- yes Action - Airs Action shows. Airs in High Definition simulcast as yes Action HD.
- yes Comedy - Airs sitcoms, comedy shows and dramedies. Airs in High Definition simulcast as yes Comedy HD.
- yes SCI FI - Airs Sci-Fi, mystery and thriller shows. Airs in High Definition simulcast as yes SCI FI HD.
- yes Base - Airs joint shows with Hot Family (of HOT).

On July 2, 2011 yes SCI FI changed to Yes Real broadcast reality shows.

== Broadcasting formats ==
yes TV Shows Channels air shows in 4 formats:

- Normal (4:3)
- Letterbox (4:3)
- Pan & Scan (4:3)
- Widescreen (16:9)

In order to watch widescreen (16:9) shows on a 4:3 TV, there are 3 options to see the picture:

- 4:3 Letterbox (Widescreen with black bars - Original Aspect Ratio)
- 16:9 (Anamorphic Widescreen)
- 4:3 (Pan & scan)

Choosing the format of the picture is in the digital set-top box setup. The setup does not affect shows which are not broadcast in Widescreen.

=== yes stars HD ===
yes stars HD broadcasts shows in High Definition at a resolution of 1080i50 with an original aspect ratio of 16:9 (widescreen) using H.264 compression format. The channel available only to the HD consumers of yes, using yes' HD set-top box. The channel aired until April 21, 2009, then it was replaced with a full schedule simulcast on 2 channels - yes stars Drama HD and yes stars Action HD.
