= Channel 8 (Israel) =

Israeli television channel

Channel 8 (HOT8)
- Type: Private
- Country: Israel
- Headquarters: Jerusalem

Programming
- Language: Hebrew

Ownership
- Owner: Slutsky Afiki Communication (סלוצקי אפיקי תקשורת)

History
- Launched: April 1992
- Former names: Science Channel (ערוץ המדע), Culture, Science and Nature Channel (ערוץ תרבות מדע וטבע)

Channel 8 (branded as HOT8; formerly known as the Science Channel (ערוץ המדע) and the Culture, Science and Nature Channel (ערוץ תרבות, מדע וטבע) is an Israeli television channel operated by the cable television company HOT. The channel commenced broadcasting in April 1992 and their content was initially produced by I.C.P (The Cable Content Company). From 1996 to 2012, production was managed by Noga Communications, after ICP was forced to withdraw the direct control of channels 5, 6 and 8. Since the end of December 2012, the channel's content has been produced by Slutsky Afiki Communication (סלוצקי אפיקי תקשורת).

The channel features a diverse range of content, including original and foreign documentaries, cultural programs, science, nature, history, environmental quality, sociology, and art. Channel 8 defines themselves as a documentary channel.

== Content ==
In its early years, the channel primarily broadcast content acquired from the Discovery Channel, following an agreement between Discovery and Tevel.

The channel features a variety of original programs, including "Blonde" by Orna Ben Dor and "Bulldog" by Mickey Rosenthal, followed by Guy Maroz. Daily broadcasts include "Hadashot Hamada" (translated to "Science News") hosted by Tal Berman, and "The Owls" (הינשופים).

The channel also features movies such as 5 Broken Cameras, Arna's Children, Waltz with Bashir and others.

=== KidZ ===
A segment of KidZ has included content from Channel 8 that has been specifically adapted for a younger audience.

== See also ==
- List of television channels in Israel
