= Yes Comedy =

Israeli television channel

yes TV Comedy
- Former logo
- Country: Israel
- Broadcast area: Israel

Programming
- Language: Hebrew
- Picture format: 576i (SDTV 16:9, 4:3); 1080i (HDTV)

Ownership
- Owner: yes (Israel's satellite television provider)
- Sister channels: yes Action HD yes Drama HD yes Oh HD yes EDGE

History
- Launched: December 14, 2008
- Former names: yes stars 1 (2007-08) yes stars Comedy (2008-10) Yes Comedy (2010-20)

Availability

Terrestrial
- Yes: 20

Yes TV Comedy (styled as yes TV Comedy and formerly called yes stars Comedy and "Yes Comedy") is an Israeli television channel carried by the Israeli satellite television provider yes, which broadcasts American and British TV shows of the sitcom, dramedy, and comedy genres. The channel aired on December 14, 2008 on channel 14 as part of the latest television shows' channels re-brand by yes. The channel is a split of the former yes stars 1 to the current yes Drama and yes Comedy. The channel used to air the shows' new episodes on weeknights (Sundays – Thursdays), and its re-runs on weekdays and weekends (Fridays – Saturdays). On January 16, 2012, the channel moved from channel 14 to channel 15. in 2020 due to the company's channel rebranding it moved from channel 15 to channel 7 and later to channel 20

On December 14, 2010, after 2 years of being on air, the channel started airing 24/7, and carried the slogan Always Funny.

== Schedule ==
Starting March 6, 2010, yes Comedy airs new episodes on weekends. There are currently airing the following shows:

=== Fridays ===
- Futurama (Season 8)
- The Simpsons (Season 21)
- It's Always Sunny in Philadelphia (Season 6)

=== Saturdays ===
- Raising Hope (Season 3)
- How I Met Your Mother (Season 9)
- Two and a Half Men (Season 10)
- Modern Family (Season 4)
- Saturday Night Live (Season 37)
- The Big Bang Theory (Season 6)
- New Girl (Season 2)
- Family Guy (Season 10)

In addition, on the weeknights there are syndicated shows alongside The Tonight Show with Jay Leno.

Starting March 13, 2011, yes airs on the weeknights 2 episodes each night of Friends in High Definition re-master. In June 2011 yes aired 2 episodes each night of Married... with Children. From December 18, 2011, yes aired 2 episodes each weeknights of Seinfeld. Also airing 2 weekly episodes of Arrested Development.

== History of the channel ==
On December 14, 2008, as part of another re-brand of the channels, yes stars 1 was replaced with yes stars Comedy. On August 20, 2010, the word stars was removed from the channel name. On January 16, 2012, the channel moved from channel 14 to channel 15, and the logo has been changed. In 2020 the channel moved from channel 15 to channel 20 and later to channel 7 and the logo and name were changed.

== Picture formats ==
From the left – yes stars Comedy logo from December 14, 2008 and until August 19, 2010. yes Comedy logo from August 20, 2010 and until December 13, 2010.

yes Comedy airs shows in 4 formats:

- Normal (4:3)
- Letterboxed (4:3)
- Pan & Scan (4:3)
- Widescreen (16:9)

In order to watch widescreen (16:9) shows on a 4:3 TV, there are 3 options to see the picture:

- 4:3 Letterbox (Widescreen with black bars – Original Aspect Ratio)
- 16:9 (Anamorphic Widescreen)
- 4:3 (Pan & scan)

Choosing the format of the picture is in the digital set-top box setup. The setup does not affect shows which are not broadcast in Widescreen. yes Comedy HD airs the shows in High Definition 1080i and in widescreen (16:9) at all times. Shows that are not shot in HD are upscaled to 1080i.

== Shows broadcast on yes Comedy ==
Series	Season	Broadcast Type	Network
30 Rock	1–7	Widescreen	NBC
Dog Bites Man	1	Pan & Scan	Comedy Central
Billable Hours	1–2	Widescreen	Showcase
Entourage	1–8	Widescreen	HBO
Family Guy	1–12	Normal	Fox
Friends	1–10	Widescreen	NBC
Futurama	7–9	Widescreen	Comedy Central
Gavin & Stacey	1–2	Widescreen	BBC Three
Glenn Martin, DDS	1-2	Widescreen	Nick at Nite
How I Met Your Mother	1–9	Pan & Scan; Widescreen	CBS
It's Always Sunny in Philadelphia	1–7	Normal	FX
Lil' Bush	1	Normal	Comedy Central
Little Britain USA	1	Widescreen	HBO
Little Mosque on the Prairie	1–3	Widescreen	CBC
Married... with Children	1–11	Widescreen	Fox
Modern Family	1–6	Widescreen	ABC
Mumbai Calling	1	Widescreen	ITV1
My Name Is Earl	1–4	Widescreen	NBC
New Girl	1-3	Widescreen	Fox
Samantha Who?	1–2	Widescreen	ABC
Scrubs	1–9	Normal	NBC
Seinfeld	1-9	Widescreen	NBC
Sordid Lives: The Series	1	Widescreen	Logo
Summer Heights High	6	Widescreen	HBO
That Mitchell and Webb Look	2	Widescreen	BBC Two
The Armstrong and Miller Show	1	Widescreen	BBC One
The Big Bang Theory	1–8	Widescreen	CBS
The Cleveland Show	1–4	Normal	Fox
The Jay Leno Show	-	Pan & Scan	NBC
The Life & Times of Tim	1	Widescreen	HBO
The New Adventures of Old Christine	1–5	Widescreen	CBS
The Omid Djalili Show	1	Widescreen	BBC One
The Simpsons	15–23	Normal	Fox
The Tonight Show with Conan O'Brien	-	Pan & Scan	NBC
The War at Home	1–2	Widescreen	Fox
'Til Death	1–4	Widescreen	Fox
Tracey Ullman's State of the Union	1–3	Widescreen	Showtime
Two and a Half Men	1–12	Widescreen	CBS
Young Sheldon	1–6	Widescreen	CBS
