= HaBigbagim =

- Genre: Children's television series
- Country of origin: Israel
- Original language: Hebrew
- No. of episodes: 26

Production
- Production location: Herzliya
- Running time: 22 minutes

Original release
- Network: Arutz HaYeladim
- Release: 1998 – 2000

HaBigbagim (Hebrew: הביגבגים, English: The Big Bug Show) is an Israeli educational television program for preschoolers, which aired on the Israeli children's channel Arutz HaYeladim between 1998 and 2000. The big bugs are five puppet insects who broadcast in a self-made TV station. Throughout the show they talk and learn about colors, imagination, friendship, responsibility etc. and also sing songs.

The names of the characters based by jazz musicians like: Dizzy (Dizzy Gillespie), Louis (Louis Armstrong), Ella (Ella Fitzgerald), Billie (Billie Holiday) and Chick (Chick Corea).

The puppets were designed by Shai Charka, but were created in the United Kingdom.

That show has a huge success in Israel, in result, that show was sold to several non-US countries (including the United Kingdom, Latin America, Portugal and Singapore) in October 1999. The first markets were the United Kingdom (CITV, to counter Teletubbies, with episodes adjusted to twenty minutes; starting 30 October 1999) and Singapore (Television Corporation of Singapore), followed by RTP2 in Portugal and a Televisa-owned channel in Mexico. Most foreign broadcasters received a package of 26 half-hour episodes, while TCS received themed episodes.

The series aired on TCS Channel 5 starting in November 1999. After its first run, Mediacorp moved the English-language children's output to Kids Central from 30 January 2000. Kids Central aired reruns in 2000.

== Characters ==
- Dizzy: A male butterfly, with all the impish charm of a six-year-old. Curious, kind-hearted, and extremely sensitive, he can always get a laugh out of his friends.
- Billie: A female ant, Her enthusiasm for whatever she does is contagious, and she can always get Dizzy to join her on a new adventure. Billie loves to appear on stage, whether it's singing, acting or hosting the show.
- Chick: A male grasshopper, The anchorman of the Bug News Network, Chick's antennae will suddenly pop up, telling him that a news story is brewing.
- Louis: A baby caterpillar, He still has lots to learn, though, and if it weren't for his sweet grin and good intentions, some of the other bugs might actually get mad at him.
- Ella: A female beetle, She's a talented scientist and recycling expert, but deep down she would also like to be a star and always hums with her record player.
