= Arutz HaYeladim =

Israeli youth television network

- Country: Israel
- Broadcast area: Nationwide
- Headquarters: Tel Aviv, Israel

Ownership
- Owner: NOGA Communications; RGE Group
- Sister channels: FOMO; HOT; HOT Buzz; Knesset Channel; Logi; Sports Channel; Vamos; Yoyo

History
- Launched: November 8, 1989; 36 years ago
- Former names: Channel 6

Links
- Website: Arutz HaYeladim

Arutz HaYeladim (Hebrew: ערוץ הילדים, The Children's Channel; Formerly: Arutz Shesh (ערוץ 6) channel 6) (no relation to the British The Children's Channel) is an Israeli children's cable television channel owned by RGE Group, through subsidiary NOGA Communications Limited. It was one of the first cable channels in Israel, along with Arutz HaMishapa, Arutz HaSratim and Arutz HaSport. It is aimed for children ages 7–14.

== History ==
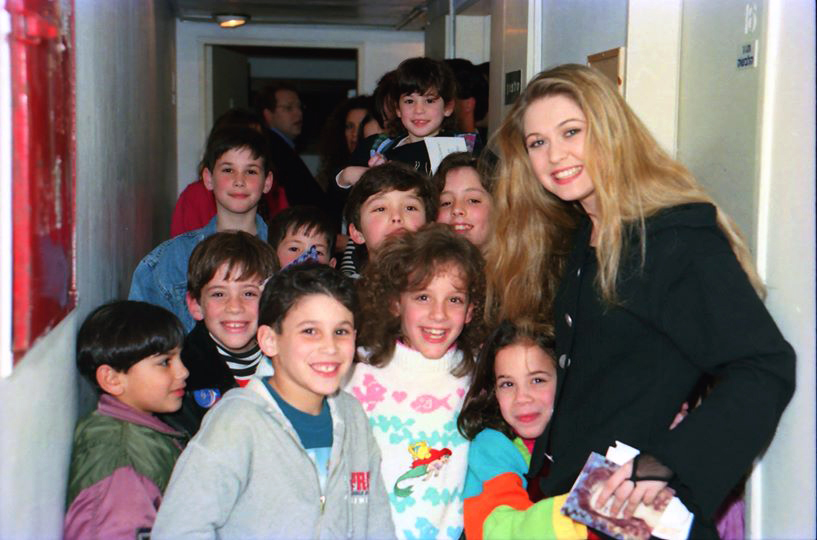
Television host Michal Yannai at Arutz HaYeladim in 1992

The channel was first launched on November 8, 1989, as a part of Israeli cable's trial broadcasting prior to the 1990 official launch. At first, the channel broadcast only two hours a day, and in its first two years it was based primarily on purchased programs. In 1991, the channel began broadcasting shows with hosts and presenters. These segments grew to bigger live shows over the years, providing a few of the presenters their tickets to stardom. The channel's growing popularity among children also led to many educational campaigns, regarding issues such as safety and tolerance.

In 1996, following the passing of the ICP Agreement in the Knesset, the channel's content was transferred to the control of the new company "Noga Tikshoret" ("Venus communication"), and the channel updated its contents to more interactive nature while also adding more original programs - a direction that the channel is following to this day.

By the mid-2000s, the channel had started to inclinate more towards female audiences, buying in the successful Italian series Winx Club and announcing MGA's Bratz for 2006. Live-hosted segments started at around 1:30pm and ran throughout the afternoon. During early evening hours, the channel aired more teenage fare, mainly female-skewing.

Oded Menashe, the last of the "original" presenters from the channel's first years, left in 2005 after 14 years; at the time, no presenter had stayed longer at the channel. As of 2012, Menashe's record was surpassed by Tal Mosseri, who joined the channel in 1997 and left in mid-2015 after 18 years as a presenter. Besides Menashe, Mosseri and Kobi Machat, who joined the channel in 2000 and left in early 2012 after 12 years as a presenter, none of the other presenters, past or present, has ever stayed in the channel for more than nine consecutive years.

The channel followed several formats over the years, with hosts and cartoons. Early shows featured Michal Yannai, who was at the beginning of her career as a children's presenter, following in the footsteps of other female hosts like Tzipi Shavit and Rivka Michaeli. The programs became known for its simple and educational format, where Michal sometimes received guests on the show, and also interacted with puppet characters. The programs was an audience favourite during the 1990s. This helped to raise Michal's profile, making her popular with children, and with spin-off products that sold almost as well as those of Ha-Comedy Store. After Einat Erlich left the channel to work at Channel 2 in 1995, After 1996, more hosts were used, including Nimrod Reshef; better known as Nimi Nim and Erez Ben Harush.

The channel aired clips from various animation departments over the years, including Hasbro, Warner Bros., Nickelodeon, DIC Entertainment and Mattel, as well as some anime.

=== Cartoon Network ===
In 2010, Cartoon Network became a television block on the channel appearing weekdays 11AM to 2PM, showing kids' shows from the channel dubbed in Hebrew. This happened because Cartoon Network's pan-Middle Eastern version was no longer available in Israel, having been removed years before the block's launch. The block was ended in 2019, when yes bought the rights of the shows.

=== US feed (IsraKids) ===
In February 2011, a US feed (IsraKids) started broadcasting on Dish Network's Israeli Select package. The line-up consisted of original productions produced for the Israeli channel. It is unknown when did it close.

== Presenters ==
=== Current presenters ===
- Hezi Din (since 2013)
- Kevin Rubin (since 2019)
- Orel Tzabari (since 2020)
- Yarden Vizel (since 2020)
- Reef Neeman (since 2021)
- Omer Hazan (since 2021)
- Maya Tzafir (since 2021)
- Tal Mosseri (1997–2015; 2022–present)

=== Former presenters ===
- Oded Menashe (1991-2005)
- Shai Avivi (1991-1994)
- Avigail Arieli (1991-1995)
- Lior Levi (1991-1992)
- Dan Toren (1991-1994)
- Orit Yaron (1992-1993)
- Natan Brand (1991-1994)
- Michal Yannai (1991-1999)
- Gilia Shtern (1991-1992)
- Sharon Kantor (1992-1997)
- Yael Abecassis (1993-1998)
- Sharon Tzur (1993-1996)
- Einat Erlich (1993-1996)
- Shlomit Arnon (1993-1994)
- Amos Shuv (1993-1998)
- Gil Sassover (1994-1999)
- Efrat Rayten (1994-2000)
- Itay Segev (1994-1999)
- Tal Berman (1995-1996)
- Tomi Yoel (1995)
- Noa Yaron-Dayan (1995-1996)
- Dana Dvorin (1995-2001)
- Guy Ross (1995-1996)
- Erez Ben Harush (1996-1999)
- Nimrod Reshef (1996-2001)
- Nitzan Bluin (1997)
- Mehereta Baruch-Ron (1997)
- Yael Bar Zohar (1997-1999)
- Didi Duksin (1997-1998)
- Dalik Volinitz (1998-2000)
- Lior Halfon (1998-1999)
- Dori Teper (1998-2001)
- Liat Achiron (1998-2005)
- Shahar Sorek (1999)
- Adi Ezroni (1999-2003)
- Sendi Bar (2000-2001)
- Kobi Machat (2000-2012)
- Dana Marmor (2001-2003)
- Miki Geva (2001-2008)
- Sivan Sasson (2002-2003)
- Tom Avni (2002-2009)
- Sofi Tsedaka (2002-2006)
- Rodrigo Gonzales (2003-2006)
- Avri Gilad (2003-2006)
- Sharon Durani (2004)
- Dikla Keidar (2004-2007)
- Hadar Levi (2004-2009)
- Michael Aloni (2005-2006)
- Shira Katzalenbugen (2005-2007)
- Meyrav Feldman (2006-2010)
- Yftah "Yfti" Krazner (2007-2010)
- Don Leni-Gabai (2008-2011)
- Adi Himelbloy (2008-2010)
- Or Meir (2009-2010)
- Yousef Sweid (2010)
- Raz Shapira (2010)
- Aviad Bentov (2010-2011)
- Udi Gotshlak (2010-2011)
- Moshik Galamin (2010-2011)
- Sharel Fitterman (2010-2011)
- Roni Duani (2010-2012)
- Oded Paz (2011-2021)
- Dana Frider (2011-2016)
- Amir Fryszer Guttman (2013-2014)
- Tom Baum (2015-2020)
- Liron Revivo (2016-2018)
- Lee Biran (2016)
- Ben Zini (2020-2021)
- Anna Zak (2020-2021)
