= Women for Sale =

2005 film by Nili Tal

- Directed by: Nili Tal
- Release date: 2005
- Running time: 56 min.
- Country: Israel
- Languages: Russian and Hebrew with English subtitles

Women for Sale (Hebrew: Nashim Limechira) is a 2005 documentary film by Israeli journalist, film director and producer Nili Tal. It explores the phenomenon of Russian women who immigrate to Israel to work as prostitutes. The film was commissioned by Channel 8, Israel.

== Synopsis ==
In the post-Perestroika era in Russia, many young women were driven to work abroad by the hardships they were suffering in their own country. Israel is one of the countries they immigrate to and work as prostitutes. Some are trafficked, some end up in prison or deported.

Women for Sale examines the lives of these women in a sympathetic, compassionate and non-judgemental manner. The film features interviews with the women, and follows the police, including during a brothel raid. The film also examines the role of religion in the women's lives.

== Festivals ==
Women for Sale was screened at the following film festivals:

- 2005: Docaviv International Documentary Film Festival (Feb 24, 2005)
- 2005: TJFF – Toronto Jewish Film Festival
- 2005: International Women's film Festival in Israel
- 2006: 4th Annual Austin Jewish Film Festival (Jan 2006)
