= Eli Stone =

American television series

- Genre: Musical; Legal drama; Comedy drama
- Created by: Greg Berlanti; Marc Guggenheim
- Starring: Jonny Lee Miller; Victor Garber; Natasha Henstridge; Loretta Devine; Sam Jaeger; Laura Benanti; James Saito; Matt Letscher; Julie Gonzalo; Jason Winston George
- Composer: Blake Neely
- Country of origin: United States
- Original language: English
- No. of seasons: 2
- No. of episodes: 26

Production
- Executive producers: Greg Berlanti; Marc Guggenheim; Ken Olin
- Producers: Carl Ogawa; Jeniffer Lence; Leila Gerstein; Chris Cheramie; Andrew Kreisberg; Andy Ackerman
- Production locations: San Francisco, California; Los Angeles, California
- Cinematography: Michael O'Shea
- Editors: Ted Desrosiers; Elena Maganini
- Camera setup: Single-camera
- Running time: 45–48 minutes
- Production companies: Berlanti Television; ABC Studios

Original release
- Network: ABC
- Release: January 31, 2008 – July 11, 2009

Eli Stone is an American comedy legal drama television series created by Greg Berlanti and Marc Guggenheim. They served as executive producers alongside Ken Olin, who directed the pilot, with Melissa Berman producing. The series aired on ABC from January 31, 2008, to July 11, 2009, for two seasons.

The series follows Stone (Jonny Lee Miller), a San Francisco lawyer who begins to have hallucinations (such as a George Michael soundtrack that only he can hear and getting dive-bombed by a World War I biplane on a busy San Francisco street) which leads him to two possible conclusions: side effects from his potentially fatal brain aneurysm, or the chance that something greater is at work. His visions lead him to accept cases with little monetary gain but a lot of moral goodness, while also – occasionally – accurately predicting things like earthquakes or plane crashes. Other such events occur throughout the course of the series, but the series was cancelled before reaching a coherent conclusion.

The series has been met with generally favorable reviews from critics, and both seasons have been released on DVD.

== Premise ==
Greg Berlanti, who co-wrote the show with Marc Guggenheim, described Eli Stone in Variety as "a Field of Dreams–type drama set in a law firm where a thirty-something attorney, whose name is the title of the show, begins having larger-than-life visions that compel him to do out-of-the-ordinary things". Eli suffers from an inoperable brain aneurysm that causes him to have realistic hallucinations often relating to the plot of the episode to the extent that he may be considered a modern-day prophet.

Pop singer George Michael was featured prominently throughout the first season of the series, and each episode was named after one of his songs. Berlanti is a fan of Michael and made an effort to have him appear on the show. As luck would have it, Michael claimed he was a "TV junkie". This led to the singer agreeing to do several episodes, including one in which Stone represents him in the case of a teen girl who plays the song "I Want Your Sex" in protest of an abstinence-only sex education program in her school.

The show's legal setting, mixture of comedy and drama, and use of fantasy sequences has drawn comparisons to the series Ally McBeal from some critics.

== Production ==
Produced by Berlanti Television, After Portsmouth, and ABC Studios, the series was officially greenlit and given a thirteen-episode order on May 11, 2007, and it aired as a mid-season replacement in 2008. Eli Stone premiered on Thursday, January 31, 2008 at 10:00 Eastern/9:00 Central, following the return of Lost; its first-season finale aired April 17, 2008.

On May 13, 2008, ABC officially announced that the show had been renewed for the 2008–09 season. Moreover, in Canada, CTVglobemedia announced that they would send down the series to CTV's relaunched "A" television system for the 2008–2009 season. Season 2 premiered on Tuesday, October 14 at 10:00 Eastern/9:00 Central.

On November 20, 2008, however, ABC told the show's producers that it had opted not to order any new episodes, signaling that the series would be cancelled once all the episodes were aired.

The last scheduled episode of Eli Stone aired on December 30, 2008. The final four episodes of the series aired on Saturdays at 10:00 Eastern/9:00 Central on ABC starting Saturday, June 20, 2009. The final episode, "Flight Path", aired on July 11, 2009.

The unaired episodes, starting with "Sonoma", were broadcast in Ireland by RTÉ starting on March 13, 2009. The British Sci-Fi channel aired the final four episodes starting on March 16, 2009. The episode aired in Israel's Yes Stars Drama/HD channel and German TV channel Pro7 starting on March 31, 2009. Finally, in Australia, the Seven Network aired the final four episodes in the month of April, on Tuesdays at 22:30.

== Cast and characters ==
=== Main ===
- Jonny Lee Miller as Eli Stone, a successful attorney at Wethersby, Posner & Klein in San Francisco, who is diagnosed with an inoperable brain aneurysm which is causing hallucinations. The hallucinations cause Eli to become alienated from his peers and soon his life takes a detour. Despite the fact that he is not religious, he interprets his hallucinations as signs, helping people in accepting lawsuits in hopes of bettering their lives.
- Natasha Henstridge as Taylor Wethersby, Eli's ex-fiancee who is also an attorney. She is the daughter of Jordan Wethersby, managing partner of Wethersby, Posner & Klein.
- Loretta Devine as Patti Dellacroix, Eli's helpful and bossy assistant. She considers Eli as a dear friend of hers and she is always blatantly honest to Eli.
- Matt Letscher as Dr. Nathan Stone, Eli's caring, elder brother who is a doctor. He is the one who first discovered Eli's conditions and is skeptical about his visions.
- Sam Jaeger as Matt Dowd, Eli's co-worker and rival in the law firm. He is described as sarcastic, arrogant and having a frat-boy personality. He is dating Taylor Wethersby and they are going to have a baby.
- James Saito as Dr. Chen, an acupuncturist who explains Eli's conditions as a prophetic message. He helps Eli to analyze the visions Eli has and advises Eli to pursue them.
- Julie Gonzalo as Maggie Dekker, a junior attorney who is ambitious and enthusiastic to her work. Much to Eli's dismay, she often assists him in his cases in hopes of moving up the career ladder. She is in love with Eli, which is somewhat mutual on his part.
- Jason Winston George as Keith Bennett, a criminal law attorney who sued a potential employer for racism. After Keith lost the lawsuit, Jordan hired him as he saw Keith's potential.
- Victor Garber as Jordan Wethersby, the co-owner of the firm and Taylor's father. He is often skeptical of Eli's imaginings.

=== Recurring ===
- Laura Benanti as Beth "Lizzie" Keller, the girl to whom Eli lost his virginity back in college who now has an autistic son. She dated Nathan.
- Tom Amandes as Martin Posner, one of the co-owners of the firm. He had a relationship with Patti in the past.
- Katey Sagal as Marci Klein, one of the co-owners of the firm. She is unfriendly, being primarily interested in the financial benefits that accrue to the firm. She dislikes Eli's intention to help more individuals than major corporations.
- Pamela Reed as Mrs. Stone. (Season 1)
- Tom Cavanagh as Jeremy Stone (flashbacks; finale episode as God), the late father of Nathan and Eli. H
- George Michael as himself (and one episode as God). (Season 1)
- Bridget Moynahan as Ashley Cardiff, Eli's ex-girlfriend.
- Taraji P. Henson as Angela Scott, Patti's daughter. (Season 2)
- Kerr Smith as Paul Rollins, a partner at Posner/Klein.

=== Special guest stars ===
- Sigourney Weaver as therapist and God.
- Katie Holmes as Grace, a woman whom Eli's father arranged for him to meet (via notes left to Nathan).
- Charlie Ray as Mia Musso, is the daughter of a client involved in a legal case.

On November 6, 2008, TV Guide reported that Jamey Sheridan would guest-star as an evening news anchor. On December 1, 2008, TV Guide reported that Gregory Smith would make a guest appearance in the show's finale.

== Episodes ==
Season	Episodes	Originally released	
Season	Episodes	First released	Last released
1	13	January 31, 2008	April 17, 2008
2	13	October 14, 2008	July 11, 2009

=== Season 1 (2008) ===
No. overall	No. in season	Title	Directed by	Written by	Original release date	Prod. code
1	1	"Faith"	Ken Olin	Greg Berlanti & Marc Guggenheim	January 31, 2008	101
Eli Stone is a rising, successful attorney. Not only is he working for Jordan Wethersby's renowned law firm, but he is engaged to Jordan's daughter Taylor, also an attorney. However, Eli begins having hallucinations (many of which involve singer George Michael) that may either be linked to a medical condition, or the bizarre chance that he is a modern-day prophet. The hallucinations lead him to reluctantly take a case involving his college friend/first lover, Beth Keller. Beth's son developed autism, which Beth blames on a childhood vaccine produced by a major pharmaceutical company. At the same time, Eli's behavior about his visions makes him recall his estranged relationship with his now-deceased father, whom Eli believes was an alcoholic. Musical number: "Faith" (sung by George Michael)
2	2	"Freedom"	Michael Schultz	Greg Berlanti & Marc Guggenheim	February 7, 2008	102
After two weeks without the visions, Eli hesitates to take the case of a Mexican couple suing a produce conglomerate for their use of pesticides, believing he has no chance of winning. However, he begins to doubt the odds after his visions prove more truthful than before. Musical number: "Freedom" (Victor Garber and a male choir)
3	3	"Father Figure"	Christopher Misiano	Alex Taub & Brett Mahoney	February 14, 2008	103
Eli has visions of World War II before taking on a National Guard soldier's custody battle with her husband, who is represented by Eli's fiancee Taylor. Meanwhile, Eli asks his brother Nathan (a physician) for help with his medical records in order to conceal his medical condition from the law firm's senior partners, thus allowing Eli to continue practicing law.
4	4	"Wake Me Up Before You Go-Go"	David Petrarca	Courtney Kemp Agboh & Wendy Mericle	February 21, 2008	104
As Eli struggles to come to terms with the end of his engagement to Taylor, his visions convince him to help a former coma patient who wants to get his life back. Meanwhile, Jordan defends an old friend in a discrimination lawsuit against another of the same ethnicity. Musical number: "Good Lovin'" (a group of Chris Diamantopouloses)
5	5	"One More Try"	Ron Underwood	Leila Gerstein & Steve Lichtman	February 28, 2008	105
Eli gets an opportunity to make things right when he revisits an old case that he unscrupulously won for an automaker, but his efforts could be undone by a series of courtroom hallucinations. Meanwhile, Jordan welcomes two new lawyers to the firm, one of whom he had fought against in the previous episode. Musical number: "One More Try" (Loretta Devine and a gospel choir)
6	6	"Something to Save"	Michael Schultz	Andrew Kreisberg & Marc Guggenheim	March 6, 2008	106
Eli needs Jordan's help when he is in danger of being disbarred, after an embarrassing courtroom episode puts his ability to practice under scrutiny. However, Eli's fate may ultimately rest with Nathan's testimony about his brother's condition---and Eli's own conscience. Musical number: "Who'll Stop the Rain" (Victor Garber and the lawyers)
7	7	"Heal the Pain"	Sandy Smolan	Alex Taub & Moira Walley	March 13, 2008	107
Eli's bar hearing admission may saved his law license but compelled Jordan to reduce him in stature at the firm. It places him in the unfamiliar position of playing second fiddle to the inexperienced Maggie. The two are involved in a malpractice suit against an anesthesiologist who used to work at Nathan's hospital but was fired after a botched anesthesia that led to the death of the teenage plaintiff's mother during heart surgery. Musical number: "Older" by George Michael
8	8	"Praying For Time"	David Petrarca	Courtney Kemp Agboh & Brett Mahoney	March 20, 2008	108
Eli's defense of a real estate mogul takes an interesting turn when his client's desire to evict residents from their homes (in an area where he wants to build a shopping mall) may be the only way to save them from an earthquake Eli has foreseen. Musical number: "I Feel the Earth Move" (Natasha Henstridge and Julie Gonzalo)
9	9	"I Want Your Sex"	Christopher Misiano	Leila Gerstein & Wendy Mercile	March 27, 2008	109
Eli's occasional visionary muse, George Michael, seeks his counsel in person on behalf of a teenage girl who was expelled from school for playing a suggestively titled song of Michael's during an abstinence education assembly. Jordan, who is heading the case, begins to display an unusual upbeat side, leading Eli to believe his senior partner is a fan of George Michael's music. Meanwhile, Nathan has found a neurosurgeon to help his brother, but is unwilling to make the choice that could decide Eli's fate. Musical numbers: "Don't Let the Sun Go Down On Me" (Victor Garber), "I Got You Babe" (Natasha Henstridge and Sam Jaeger), "Amazing" (George Michael), "I Can Taste Love" Claess & Willumsen
10	10	"Heartbeat"	Vincent Misiano	Andrew Kreisberg & Steve Lichtman	April 3, 2008	110
Eli's visions take him into Nathan's memories of the day their father died. Nathan asks Eli to represent him in a case dealing with the heart transplant of a patient. Eli's vision makes him aware of the fact his brother is keeping a secret that could be of great help for his case.
11	11	"Patience"	Perry Lang	Brett Mahoney & Alex Taub	April 10, 2008	111
Eli has visions, set in the future, of David Moseley speaking to a massive crowd in Times Square. Learning that Moseley is a prisoner currently being held at Tipton Bay, Eli secures help from Keith and Maggie in representing Moseley and other Tipton Bay prisoners in a case for prisoners' rights when the 15-year-old daughter of a client involved of a legal case . Taylor and Matt work together on a struggle for chimpanzee rights, and a long-lost partner returns to the firm. A final vision refines the earlier one, showing Moseley is simply opening for Eli's speech to the crowd and showing Maggie, with her and Eli's baby, in attendance.
12	12	"Waiting For That Day"	David Petrarca	Oscar Balderrama & Anna Beth Chao	April 13, 2008	112
Eli's visions bring him back to the supposed earthquake. This time, he sues San Francisco to close the Golden Gate Bridge. Supported by a so-called quack scientist, Eli opposes Ms. Klein and Maggie in a court case that could decide the lives of hundreds. At the same time, Ms. Klein uses Jordan's apparent lack of control over Eli as ammunition to remove Jordan as managing partner. At the end of the episode, the earthquake does hit and destroys the Golden Gate Bridge. Fortunately, because the bridge was closed (they managed to persuade San Francisco to close it), no one was killed on it when it collapsed. Ms. Klein reconciles and keeps Jordan as managing partner. Musical number: "The One You Knew" by Joshua Radin
13	13	"Soul Free"	Michael Lange	Andrew Kreisberg & Courtney Kemp Agboh	April 17, 2008	113
Eli takes a case involving a man's right to die; the case is intertwined with the aftermath of Eli's surgery to remove his brain aneurysm, which forces Nathan to decide whether to remove Eli from life support. Eli apparently comes face to face with God . . . who bears an uncanny resemblance to George Michael. Musical number: "Feeling Good" (George Michael and cast)

=== Season 2 (2008–09) ===
No. overall	No. in season	Title	Directed by	Written by	Original release date	Prod. code
14	1	"The Path"	Perry Lang	Marc Guggenheim & Andrew Kreisberg	October 14, 2008	201
Eli is free from his visions for the past six months after having an operation to remove his brain aneurysm—or so he thinks. Nate experiences visions of his own suffering a similar fate as Eli that go along with the gift. Taylor faces a dilemma when her father is trapped in a collapsed building. Musical number: "Dancing in the Street" (Loretta Devine and cast)
15	2	"Grace"	David Petrarca	Leila Gerstein & Alex Taub	October 21, 2008	202
Eli has his vision back with a beautiful brunette singing to him. The lady is Grace (Katie Holmes) who turns out to be very much real and not just a vision after meeting her. Eli and Grace fall for each other. The same week Eli represents a father attempting to stop his son from receiving a military burial. Musical number: "Hit Me With a Hot Note" (Katie Holmes)
16	3	"Unwritten"	Vincent Misiano	Andrew Kreisberg & Leila Gerstein	October 28, 2008	203
Jordan has a tough task of defending against charges of insanity. Eli is on a mission against lead paint manufacturers that may bring him before the Supreme Court.
17	4	"Should I Stay or Should I Go?"	Jamie Babbit	Steve Lichtman & Brett Mahoney	November 11, 2008	204
In the aftermath of their law firm's split, Eli and Jordan struggle to retain associates and they must face the financial repercussions of Jordan's coup; the firm's largest clients opt to go with rival firm Posner/Klein.
18	5	"The Humanitarian"	David Petrarca	Wendy Mericle & Dahvi Waller	November 18, 2008	205
Eli and Jordan have problems with regular clientele and keeping up with costs with their new firm. Eli convinces Jim Cooper (Steven Culp), a billionaire philanthropist, to lead the case on trial drug testing. Eli is put in a difficult situation when he learns Cooper's son (Marshall Allman) wants no part in the trial. Meanwhile, Keith represents Patti's daughter, Angela, while Matt and Maggie work to find the traitor amongst their midst. Musical Number: "You Don't Mess Around with Jim" (Victor Garber)
19	6	"Happy Birthday Nate"	Perry Lang	Alex Taub & Brett Mahoney	December 2, 2008	206
Eli envisions himself within his father's body. Taylor has news to tell Matt about her pregnancy. Keith presumes the worst of Angela's daughter.
20	7	"Help!"	Michael Grossman	Andrew Kreisberg & Steve Lichtman	December 9, 2008	207
Patti's daughter is arrested for drug abuse. Eli is convinced that Angela's innocent after his most recent vision. While attending a nightclub performance by Seal, Matt finally professes his love to Taylor – causing a riff when Taylor does not reciprocate. Musical number: "A Change is Gonna Come", and "Crazy" by Seal.
21	8	"Owner of a Lonely Heart"	Ron Underwood	Leila Gerstein	December 16, 2008	208
After a few dates with Ashley, Eli is ready to tell her about his gift, but is surprised to see her reaction. Keith and Eli defend a 22-year-old girl (Danielle Panabaker) who could discover the secret of cold fusion.
22	9	"Two Ministers"	David Petrarca	Dahvi Waller & Wendy Mericle	December 30, 2008	209
Eli finds out more about Nate and Beth's engagement being called off. Keith and Eli help a Methodist minister (Dallas Malloy) with a lawsuit against his own church, and Taylor and Matt find out about their baby's health. Musical number: "This Night" by Laura Benanti.
23	10	"Sonoma"	Vincent Misiano	Brett Mahoney & Alex Taub	June 20, 2009 (US); 13 March 2009 (Ireland); 16 March 2009 (UK); 7 April 2009 (Australia)	210
When a news anchor from one of the biggest media corporations loses his job, Eli, Taylor, Matt and Maggie share an awkward car ride to Sonoma to question a witness (Suzie Plakson) – and suffer a more awkward presence before a judge (Michaela Watkins) whom Matt dated in law school but broke up with by e-mail after graduation. When Maggie helps Eli realize that they she fell for him when he gave a speech at her law school, they consummate their relationship. In the morning, Maggie hurriedly decides that he wants to dismiss it as due to his now-two brain aneurysms, which he and Chen believe are the consequence of his repeated 'Dark Truth' treatments. Musical Number: "Red Red Wine" (Choir in Eli's dream)
24	11	"Mortal Combat"	Michael Schultz	Marc Guggenheim & Leila Gerstein	June 27, 2009 (US); 20 March 2009 (Ireland); 23 March 2009 (UK); 14 April 2009 (Australia)	211
Eli takes the case of the former news anchor (Jamey Sheridan) suing for being squeezed out of his job over exposing of his station's top advertiser. After sleeping with Maggie in Sonoma, Eli faces off against her in their latest trial and realizes she's emerged as a formidable attorney. Meanwhile, Matt tries to assist his former firm - which ultimately leads to a profound decision on his part.
25	12	"Tailspin"	Bethany Rooney	Andrew Kreisberg & Steve Lichtman	July 4, 2009 (US); 27 March 2009 (Ireland); 30 March 2009 (UK); 21 April 2009 (Australia)	212
Eli starts to get envious of Maggie going out with Paul, especially since Paul works with her at Posner & Klein. Matt starts his tenure at Jordan and Eli take on corporate greed when hundreds of employees are left penniless when they are laid off and the ex-CEO (Michael Reilly Burke) walks with $43 million.
26	13	"Flight Path"	David Petrarca	Oscar Balderrama & Lindsey Allen	July 11, 2009 (US); 3 April 2009 (Ireland); 30 March 2009 (UK); 28 April 2009 (Australia)	213
Eli's visions lead him to believe that someone close to him will die in a plane crash. As Eli tries to unravel the mystery, he and Keith take on the case of Diane (Jaime Murray), who is in need of a heart transplant, but whose donor's parents have reversed their consent over Diane's atheism. Eli prevails and Diane is being prepped for surgery when an embolism causes brain death. Eli's visions show him that he dies of a heart attack at an airport boarding gate for a specific flight; he later learns that Maggie and Paul will be on the flight, but one of his aneurysms bursts as he rushes to the gate. Unconnected, Maggie suddenly disembarks, realizing that she truly loves Eli, inadvertently saving his life by informing the paramedics that it is likely his aneurysm, not a heart attack. With the delay, the pilot has to rerun all safety checks, discovering the problem that would have downed the plane. Eli's final vision (of the series) is God, embodied as his and Nate's father, explaining that the heart meant for Diane saves Grace's life – and points out that, during this brief conversation, Eli has acknowledged that he loves Maggie.

== Reception ==
=== Ratings ===
Season	Timeslot (EDT)	Season premiere	Season finale	TV season	Rank	Viewers (in millions)	18-49	Network
1	Thursday 10:00pm Sunday 10:00pm (April 13, 2008)	January 31, 2008	April 17, 2008	2008	#80	8.09	2.8	ABC
2	Tuesday 10:00pm (October 14-December 30, 2008); Saturday 10:00pm (June 20-July 11, 2009)	October 14, 2008	July 11, 2009	2008–2009	#77	5.28	2.4	ABC

=== Critical reception ===
Season one was met with generally favorable reviews. On Rotten Tomatoes, Season One holds a 61% rating based on 28 reviews. In 2014, it held a Metacritic score of 62 out of 100, based on 24 collected reviews.

Season Two holds a 60% rating based on 5 reviews on Rotten Tomatoes In 2014, it held a Metacritic score of 72 out 100, based on 9 collected reviews.

=== Controversy ===
The debut episode attracted controversy due to its plot line, which depicts the hypothesis that autism is caused by a mercury-based preservative formerly used in common childhood vaccines and treats the hypothesis as being credible and legally compelling. This hypothesis is not supported by scientific evidence, but has contributed to decreased vaccination rates. The American Academy of Pediatrics asked ABC to either cancel the episode or include a disclaimer emphasizing that mercury is not used in routine childhood vaccines, and that no scientific link exists between vaccines and autism. ABC instead decided to present a written notice and voice-over after the episode saying "The preceding story is fictional and does not portray any actual persons, companies, products or events", with a second card directing viewers to the autism web site of the Centers for Disease Control and Prevention.

=== Awards and nominations ===
Awards and nominations for Eli Stone
Year	Award	Category	Result
2008	ALMA Awards	Outstanding Supporting Actress in a Drama Television Series - Julie Gonzalo	Won
2008	NAACP Image Awards	Outstanding Actress in a Drama Series - Loretta Devine	Nominated
2008	Satellite Awards	Best Actor - Musical or Comedy Series - Jonny Lee Miller	Nominated
2008	WGA Awards	Episodic Drama - "Pilot"	Nominated
2009	Prism Awards	Drama Series Multi-Episode Storyline - "The Humanitarian," "Happy Birthday, Nate," "Help"	Nominated

== International airings ==
Eli Stone premiered on ABC on January 31, 2008. It premiered on Fox Life in Greece, and AXN in Japan in 2010. In the UK, the show was first shown on the Sci-Fi Channel in 2008 and was then broadcast on Fiver in June 2010. In Malaysia, the show premiered on TV2 in June 2009, airing all the complete 26 episodes until December 23, 2009. The series was later re-run in 2010.

== Home media ==
On September 2, 2008, Walt Disney Studios Home Entertainment (under the ABC Studios brand name) released the complete first season of Eli Stone on DVD in Region 1. Season 1 was also released in Region 4 on March 18, 2009. The second and final season was released in Region 1 on August 18, 2009. By February 2013 the First Season had also been released as Region 2 in a combined Denmark, Sweden, Norway, Finland set. This set includes the original English dialogue with no captions as the default.

DVD name	Ep #	Release dates		
DVD name	Ep #	Region 1	Region 2	Region 4
The Complete First Season	13	September 2, 2008	By February 2013	March 18, 2009
The Complete Second Season	13	August 18, 2009	Unknown.	Unknown.

== Future ==
The series lasted two seasons with 26 episodes. Series creator Marc Guggenheim revealed that, if the show had been renewed for a third season, Eli would have had a complete wrap-up, including Taylor giving birth to a baby girl and Matt being a surprisingly good father with a better attitude to others, Jordan meeting his ex-wife for the first time since the divorce, and Eli briefly meeting Grace again. The planned series finale would have shown that Eli eventually gained a high profile as a prophet sharing his visions and message of hope and compassion with the world, hinted at in the first season episode "Patience", though predictably placing his life in danger.
