= Yes Oh =

Israeli television channel

yes Oh
- yes Oh intertitle
- Country: Israel

Programming
- Picture format: 576i (SDTV 16:9, 4:3); 1080i (HDTV)

Ownership
- Owner: yes (Israel's satellite television provider)
- Sister channels: yes Action HD yes Comedy HD yes Drama HD yes EDGE

History
- Launched: January 21, 2012
- Former names: yes Next yes stars Next yes SCI FI yes Real

Yes Oh (styled as yes Oh) was a former Israeli television channel carried by the Israeli satellite television provider - yes, which broadcasts newer American and British TV Shows from HBO, AMC, Showtime, Starz and FX at Midnights. The channel began airing on January 21, 2012, on channel 14, replacing yes Real.

yes Oh aired all of its schedule in High Definition simulcast on yes Oh HD on channel 14.

After the cancellation of yes Oh, its shows have been moved to other yes TV channels.

== Programs shown ==
- Dexter (TV series)
- Masters of Sex
- Ray Donovan
- Hannibal (TV series)
- Downton Abbey
- Da Vinci's Demons
- Spartacus: Blood and Sand
- Vikings (TV series)
- American Horror Story
- The Americans
- the Killing
- Tyrant (TV series)
- Louie
- Game of Thrones
- Boardwalk Empire
- The Sopranos
- Rome
- True Blood
- True Detective
- Banshee (TV series)
- Luck (TV series)
- The Newsroom
- Vinyl (TV series)
- VEEP
- Girls
- Silicon Valley (TV series)
- Curb Your Enthusiasm
- In Treatment
- The Wire
- Spy
- Wilfred
- A Young Doctor's Notebook (TV series)
- The Following
- The Bridge (2011 TV series)
- The Fall (TV series)
- The Knick

== History of the channel ==
=== yes stars Next / yes Next ===
The logo of yes Next from August 20, 2010 and until January 15, 2011.

On January 17, 2010, yes launched the channel Yes Next (styled as yes Next and formerly called yes stars Next), which broadcast American, British and Israeli TV shows from all genres. The concept of the channel was to air shows approaching to the younger demographics. The channel began airing on January 17, 2010 on channel 15 - as part of the latest television shows' channels re-brand by yes. yes Next also aired shows which were available in HD in High Definition simulcast on yes Next HD.

On January 15, 2011, yes Next went off-air and was replaced by yes SCI FI. yes SCI FI will air all of its schedule in high definition simulcast on yes SCI FI HD.

=== yes SCI FI ===
The logo of Yes SCI Fi from January 15, 2011 and until July 1, 2011.

On January 15, 2011 yes Next replaced by yes SCI FI, which broadcasts American and British TV Shows of the Science Fiction and Thrillers genres. The channel airs the shows' new episodes on weeknights (Sundays - Thursdays) and on Saturday, and its re-runs on weekdays and weekends (Fridays - Saturdays).

=== yes Real ===
On July 3, 2011 yes SCI FI was replaced by yes Real, which broadcasts American and British TV Shows of the Reality Television genres. The channel airs the shows' new episodes on weeknights (Sundays - Thursdays) and on Saturday, and its re-runs on weekdays and weekends (Fridays - Saturdays).

On January 16, 2012 yes Real was shut down and replaced by yes Oh on January 21.

== Picture formats ==
yes Oh airs shows in 4 formats:

- Normal (4:3)
- Letterboxed (4:3)
- Pan & Scan (4:3)
- Widescreen (16:9)

In order to watch widescreen (16:9) shows on a 4:3 TV, there are 3 options to see the picture:

- 4:3 Letterbox (Widescreen with black bars - Original Aspect Ratio)
- 16:9 (Anamorphic Widescreen)
- 4:3 (Pan & scan)

Choosing the format of the picture is via the digital set-top box setup. The setup does not affect shows which are not broadcast in Widescreen.

yes Oh HD airs the shows in High Definition 1080i and in widescreen (16:9) at all times. Shows that are not shot in HD are upscaled to 1080i.
