= Knesset Channel =

Israeli parliamentary broadcaster

- Type: Television network
- Country: Israel
- Availability: Israel (digital terrestrial broadcast and free satellite transmission, via cable and satellite subscribe)
- Owner: Second News Company
- Launch date: 3 May 2004
- Official website: Knesset Channel

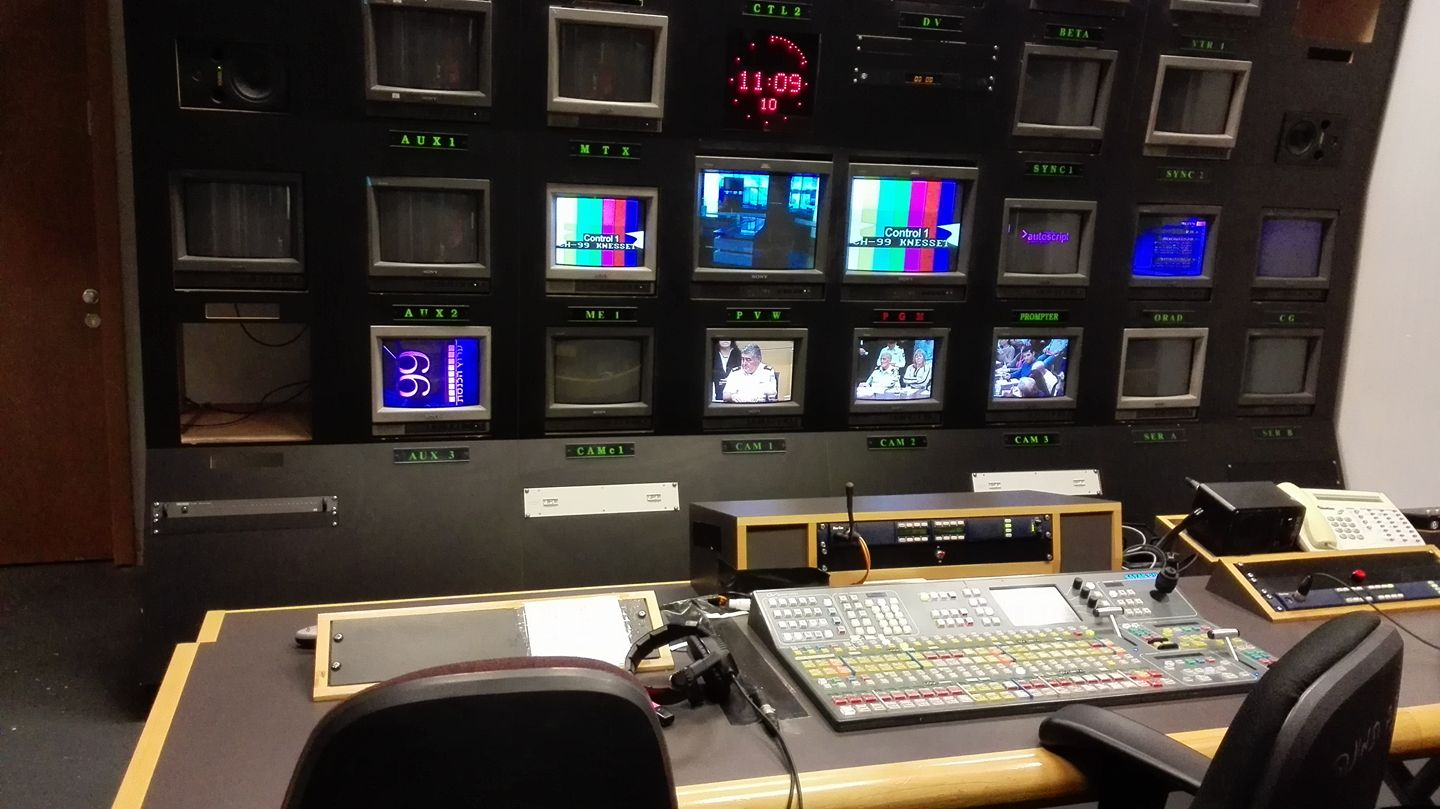
Knesset Channel

The Knesset Channel (Hebrew: ערוץ כנסת, romanized: Arutz Knesset) is a public Israeli terrestrial channel that broadcasts the sessions of the Knesset and other programmes concerning Israeli parliamentary proceedings.

Prior to the establishment of the Knesset Channel in 2004, the Knesset programming were produced by the Israel Broadcasting Authority and were relayed in its Channel 33 (Israel).

It is available via digital terrestrial broadcast and via open satellite. It is also relayed in the TV-subscribing companies: digital cable channel 99, analog cable channel 41, yes channel 99. Satellite reception details:

- Orbital location: 4°W (AMOS-3 satellite)
- Central Frequency: 11,625 MHz
- Polarization: Vertical
- Signal Ratio: 3000
- FEC: 3/4
- Azimuth to satellite: 236° (in Israel)
- Elevation to satellite: 34.1° (in Israel)

It is also available online. The channel is operated by RGE, and until 2020 it was operated by the Israel News Company.

== Presenters ==
- Daniel Ben-Simon
- Emmanuel Halperin
- Tom Segev
