= Yes (company) =

Israeli satellite television provider

D.B.S. Satellite Services (1998) Ltd
- Trade name: yes
- Native name: די.בי.אס. שרותי לווין (1998) בע״מ
- Company type: Subsidiary
- Industry: Satellite television
- Founded: 28 July 2000; 25 years ago
- Headquarters: Tel Aviv, Israel
- Area served: Israel (Green Line and other areas)
- Key people: Ron Ayalon (CEO)
- Products: Direct broadcast satellite, pay television, pay-per-view
- Parent: Bezeq
- Website: www.yes.co.il

yes (Hebrew: יס; stylized as yes.), formerly incorporated as D.B.S. Satellite Services (1998) Ltd (Hebrew: די.בי.אס. שרותי לווין (1998) בע״מ), is the sole direct broadcast satellite television provider in Israel. It broadcasts multichannel TV and VOD services via Israeli satellites Amos-3 and Amos-7. It also offers DVR capabilities, and 4K support. The largest shareholder of the provider is the Bezeq corporation, which holds up to 49% of its shares.

The early years of the company were unstable due to technical and financial difficulties. Even though the three main cable companies in Israel sought to compete with the satellite company by slashing prices, the subscriber base grew due to the new services that Yes offered, as well as the lack of cable coverage in many rural areas. In response, the cable companies merged into one company under the name HOT.

In 2017, yes served about 600,000 subscribers.

Yes provides television services to more than half a million customers using two Israeli satellites, AMOS-2 and AMOS-3. The company broadcasts more than 200 television stations from around the world, along with exclusive Israeli channels. Yes provides STING TV over its fiber network, as well as the OTT service Yes+. By 2025, near the end of the contract with Amos, 90% of its subscriber base had moved to it, while a limited satellite service continues operating on AMOS and on the newly-launched IAI Dror satellite.

In addition to its subscription television operations, Yes owns Yes Studios, and also supports the Israeli film industry.

== History ==
Ahead of its launch, Pace supplied 75,000 set-top boxes for the provider in 1999. Bezeq injected US$12 million in April 2000. Poalim Communications owned 10% of the company. The cable companies made their first retaliation against Yes in late December 1999: once the three companies were combined to form a larger group, the new group planned to introduce telephone service at lower prices than those practiced by Bezeq, as well as free internet access to kindergartens and schools.

Yes began test broadcasting on 29 May 2000. The initial phase contained a 30-channel line-up, featuring Channel 1, Channel 2, Education 23, three in-house movie channels (Yes 1, Yes 2, Yes 3), Cartoon Network, Hallmark, TCM, CNN International, National Geographic Channel, Viva, VH1, BBC World, Sky News, BBC Prime, Eurosport, Channel 33, Fashion TV, MTV, foreign channels (one per language, in Arabic, Russian, French and German) and five radio stations. From July, the company would carry Channel 3, Channel 4, Channel 5 and Channel 6, the independent channels owned by the cable companies. In June, the company was in breach of regulations regarding subscriber numbers during its trial phase, having a base of 3,000 subscribers, three times the number permitted by law (1,000). Full broadcasting began in July 2000. At launch, the company priced its service at NIS 129 compared to NIS 159 for the cable companies. The company's launch (and long-used) slogan was "Larger than life cinematic experience" (חוויה קולנועית גדולה מהחיים), which was mainly used as a key to lure subscribers to its offer of movie and TV series channels.

On 17 August 2000, it launched Blue, its adult channel, following the launch of Playboy TV the previous week. The channel aired from 10pm to 4am (up to 5am on weekends), was encrypted and PIN-protected. As of January 2001, it delivered 82 television channels. 20% of subscribers had access to all channels available. 30% of the subscriber base subscribed to add-on channels, Yes's in-house Briza channel was the most-subscribed. By April, it had 130,000 subscribers and started offering decoders to new subscribers for free. Yes data on 21 April revealed that there were 2.2 decoders per subscriber. The goal was to reach 300,000 subscribers by the end of the year. On 29 October 2001, it started carrying NBA TV. May 2002 reports said that the average subscriber spent NIS 185 per month. The company announced in February 2003 that, in case of the escalation of the war in Iraq, all of its kids and youth channels would be available free to all subscribers for an undetermined period of time. On 23 February, it announced the creation of a new package priced at NIS 40. The cable companies did not announce a countermeasure. The campaign was announced in time for the Oscars, of which Yes had the exclusive rights. This had an accompanying advertising campaign costing US$1,5 million, while the cost of obtaining the Academy Awards that year was at US$120,000, twice the amount the cable companies bid for in 2002.

Yes adopted a new logo in late October 2004, replacing the existing slogan ("Larger than life cinematic experience") with "Say Yes", and replacing its dark blue logo featuring two crossed rings with a new circular logo using a variety of colors. Coinciding with this decision was its sponsorship of a themed festival, yesfesT.V., at the Hayarkon Park later that month (15 and 16 October), which featured promotional actions from some of its channels. In addition, with the rebrand, Yes planned to launch Yes Weekend, an entertainment channel featuring reality and drama series, as well as original productions such as The Yacht - Travel Diary, funded by Yes's parent company Bezeq. All of this came at a time when Hot lost subscribers and Yes gained a higher amount of new subscribers compared to those who left the competitor. In the first full year of the Hot brand, Hot lost 26,500 subscribers; Yes gained approximately 43,000. The company announced at the very end of December 2004 that it would remove France 2 from its offer, which it justified as being "uneconomic" and that it had unresolved rights issues. The channel's office in Israel said that the reception of the channel was not scrambled in the Middle East and that it was open to new negotiations to restore the channel.

On 18 November 2004, yes started offering its customers the first DVR in Israel, called yesMax (similar in function to the TiVo). Yes Docu started broadcasting in June 2005, starting a conflict with Noga Communications-owned Channel 8, which was not part of CRSC negotiations to carry the channel on the provider. On 6 September 2007, yes had its signals disrupted due to Israel's attack on a nuclear reactor in Syria. By mid-October, its signals were back in order and gave its subscribers a three-month compensation period giving them access to every channel to recoup its losses, excluding the erotic channels and the DVDBOX VOD service. HD services started on December 23, 2007, ahead of HOT; the company expected 10,000 subscribers by year-end 2008.

Yes's earnings were negative between January and July 2010, but had improved by August. Key indicators included its ongoing support for the Israeli film industry as well as its leadership among the series channels.

On 14 March 2019, Bezeq announced that it would discontinue satellite television services over a period of several years.

Yes in August 2025 announced that it would continue operating a satellite service on the Dror 1 satellite built by IAI. Although it is a military satellite, it has capacity for civilian use. The provider grew its number of subscribers in 2023 (driven mostly by its fiber-based network) and announced the migration in accordance with the end of the contract with AMOS. 90% of the subscriber base is using Yes only for its internet-based services.

== STINGTV ==
The company markets itself as a "disassembled" TV service, customized to each customer, offering specific content packages that can be ordered separately and combined. The packages offered are: movies, series, children, sport ONE, sports 1, and science and nature. There is also a family package that includes all the packages at a discounted price.

The service content consists of Idan+ channels, which are freely transmitted to each dedicated digital converter, additional channels that can be chosen specifically, and VOD service where content is offered as part of the packages chosen by the customer. In addition, the service is provided on an AndroidTV converter, either via a proprietary STINGTV BOX converter or with a separate AndroidTV converter that can be purchased independently. This allows users to download a variety of content applications such as DailyMotion, YouTube, Netflix, and more.

== High definition ==
On 23 December 2007 yes began broadcasting in high definition. The broadcasting format is Widescreen 16:9 with resolution of 1080i50. The broadcasting system is DVB-S2 and H.264. There is also support for content in 720p. On some of the content there is also 5.1 Dolby Digital sound. In April 2011, yes had 18 HD channels (one of them in 3D). Receiving the broadcastings in HD is available only with yes HD set-top boxes - ADB 7820S - which has multiple digital and analog outputs - including HDMI (1.3a) and S/PDIF - coaxial and optical.

On 22 April 2009 yes released the HD-DVR set-top box - yesMaxHD (ADB 7820SX/7720SX) - which can record two shows simultaneously, also in High Definition. Upon its launch came a campaign by Twisted Fly which invited former Israeli referees apologizing for their mistakes. In the first week of July 2009, it was responsible for 20% of advertising-driven talks in Israel; the conversation focused on three aspects: reaction from netizens, their attitude related to the referees and their apologies. Some netizens thought that this campaign was an artificial impulse to increase the amount of MaxHD decoders.

In the beginning of May 2010, yes started to provide a Russian language audio track for HD movie channels.

In November 2011 yes introduced a Streamer feature within yesMaxHD available to those who purchase the VOD feature, yes named this yesMaxTOTAL. As of 2021, the yes Streamer feature is no longer available and has been discontinued.

== Advertising ==
Most Yes commercials were done by McCann Erickson Tel Aviv.

- Vietnam War: created in June 2005 to promote the launch of widescreen movie channel Yes Impact. Cost of the campaign: US$700,000.
- Gladiator: inspired by the 2000 film Gladiator and released in February 2007, the commercial was meant to promote yesMax. The commercial begins with a violent scene in which a gladiator fights at the Colosseum's arena. Suddenly, at the apex of its action, before the gladiator decapitated his opponent, he is interrupted by the emperor, receiving word that "Kaplan's baby (referring to the other side of the commercial, outside of the TV set) is crying", beginning to sing a lullaby to him. The commercial, according to a Yedioth Ahronoth/Ynet writer Dorit Zimmand-Scheiner, extolled the connection between the commercial and the product: pausing a movie when it is being shown on television, in order for the viewer to do tasks without losing out on its actions (specifically, in the commercial, trying to put the baby to sleep), resuming when the viewer paused. The closing narration, instead of reinforcing the aim of the movie, simply said "maximum movies, maximum shows, maximum sports", and a unit that "changes the viewing experience". Dorit claimed that the message favored the message, but not the experience, and said that more could be made out of it.
- Haredi: launch campaign of Yes HDTV. The campaign entered circulation on Israeli media outlets on 28 November 2007 and depicted ultra-orthodox Jews singing a cover of "Y.M.C.A." (as "HDTV", claiming it to be "against the Torah"), enabling the Haredis to have access to "abominations" in higher image quality. The commercial was removed from circulation on 7 December 2007 after a letter was sent to a representative of the Second Authority for Television and Radio, journalist Yossi Elitov, claiming that the commercial had compared the Jewish stereotypes seen to the treatment of Jews by Germany in the 1930s Despite the controversy, the commercial was still praised by Hagit Kamin for its efficiency.
- YesMax HD (Stone Age): created in June 2009 to promote the launch of the yesMax HD decoder, using a soccer match set in the stone age as a metaphor for technological evolution, as the match "evolved" during the commercial. Cost of the campaign: NIS 10 million.

== Criticism ==
=== Involvement in Israeli settlements ===
On 12 February 2020, the United Nations published a database of companies doing business in the West Bank, including East Jerusalem. Yes was listed on the database on account of its activities in Israeli settlements in these occupied territories, which are considered illegal under international law.

When Yes was in its planning stages, Ariel-based cable company Cabletech, which used Golden Channels' infrastructure and services, planned a collaboration with the DBS service. The Tel Aviv District Court forbade Yes from disconnecting subscribers or damage its infrastructure.

=== Accusations of hidden advertising in blogs ===
In December 2011, Israeli blogger Nofi of PornStar Life XD extolled the virtues of the then-new Yes Streamer service, annexing its instructional video. The blogger said that the post was published in exchange for promotional compensation from the company, which she refused to mention. Ynet investigated the issue and believed it was hidden advertising. This had previously happened in the late 2000s, when McCann Erickson Tel Aviv, Yes's go-to advertising agency, paid bloggers with promotional campaigns for True Blood in 2008 and the 2009 campaign "Yes in the City" at Dizengoff Center, to which Yes instructed bloggers to review it at the cost of NIS 1,000. Nofi was paid 250 shekels plus VAT for her post.

=== Julia Louis-Dreyfus commercial ===
Yes pulled a commercial in July 2013 featuring Julia Louis-Dreyfus. In it, she rubbed the stomach of an unpregnant woman, congratulating her for being without a child, after thinking she was pregnant. The intended purpose of the commercial was to criticize such a mistake and switch to Yes. Locals criticized the commercial, believing it illustrated social stigmas on overweight people, prompting the Second Authority to pull the commercial from its channels. In response, Yes also removed the commercial from its YouTube account, being replaced by an apology saying that the message was about "how one may handle making a mistake". It was later revealed that the commercial was removed because its airing cycle on television had been finished.

== See also ==
- Yes Stars
- Television in Israel
- Hot (Israel)
