= Hot (Israel) =

Israeli cable television, internet and telecommunications company

Hot Telecommunication Systems Ltd.
- Native name: הוט - מערכות תקשורת בע"מ
- Type: Subsidiary
- Industry: Telecommunications and cable television
- Founded: August 18, 2003; 23 years ago
- Headquarters: Tel Aviv, Israel
- Area served: Israel
- Key people: Tal Granot Goldstein (CEO)
- Parent: Altice Europe N.V.
- Subsidiaries: Hot mobile
- Website: www.hot.net.il (in Hebrew)

Hot Telecommunication Systems Ltd. (stylized as HOT; Hebrew: הוט - מערכות תקשורת בע"מ) is a company that provides cable television, last-mile Internet access, broadband and telecommunication services in Israel. It also provides various data transmission services and network services at different rates, services to the business sector and other ancillary services.

In November 2004, Hot Telecom commenced providing domestic fixed line telephone services to residential and business subscribers. The company's shares were traded on the Tel Aviv Stock Exchange and it was a constitute of the TA-100 Index until its acquisition by Altice. In March 2013, the company employed 3,958 workers.

== History ==
Golden Channels logo used from 1992 until 1998

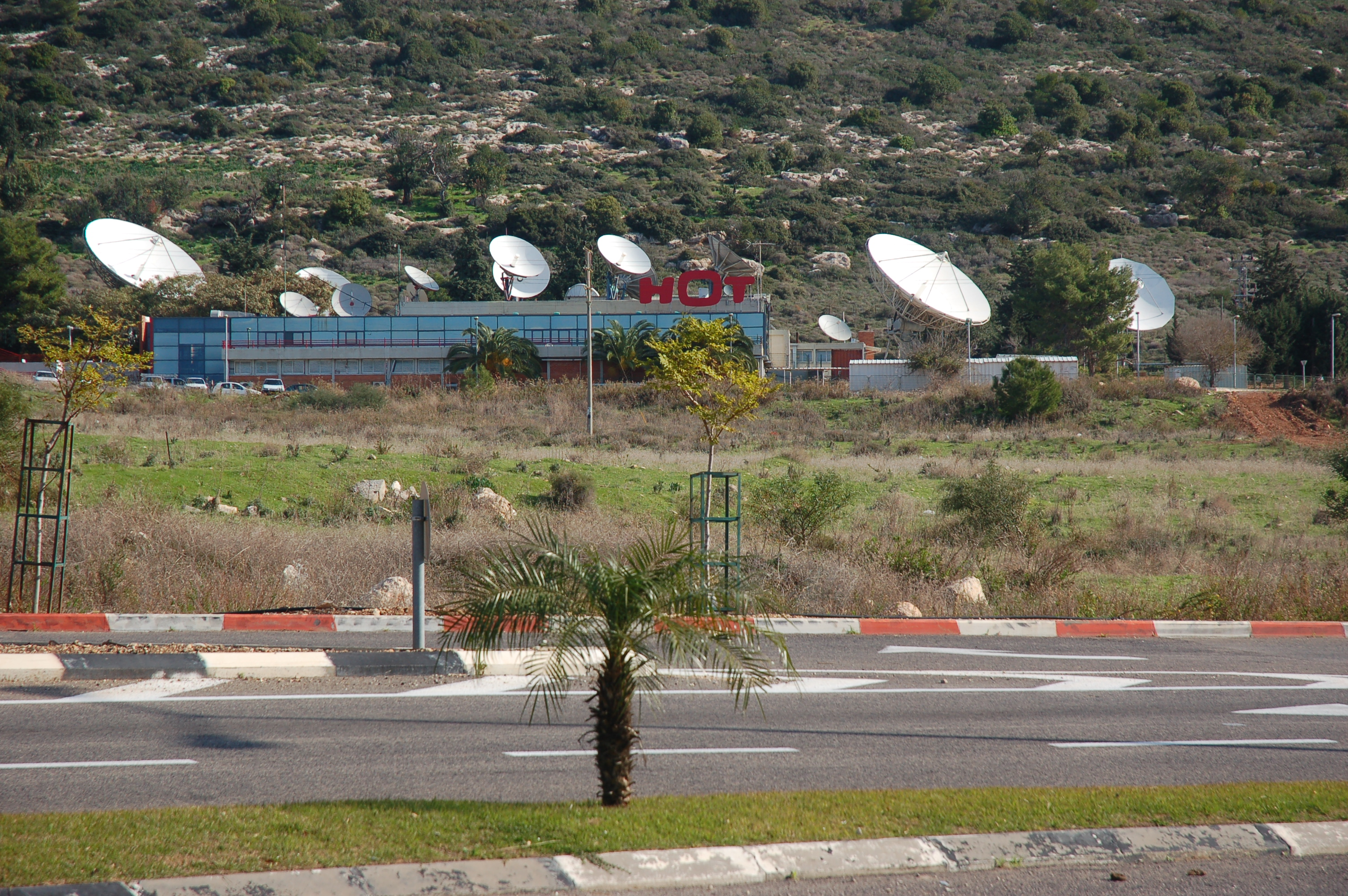
Hot's broadcasting center in the southern outskirts of Haifa

=== Pre-merger ===
Cable television was regulated in 1989, following concerns over IBA losing viewers to relays of Jordanian and Lebanese TV and illegal cable companies and VHS tapes. These were forbidden from carrying national news, which would only be reserved for Channel 2, but only when it was expected to become a regular service. 26 channels were authorized by June 1989, among them CNN International, Rai Uno, 3sat and a Chilean channel. There were also offerings from France, Spain, Belgium, Ethiopia, Cyprus, Egypt and Turkey. Syrian channels, channels from the Saudi-backed Arabsat satellite and later also Iran were banned.

There were six companies legalized:

- Tevel: Tel Aviv, Ashkelon, Ashdod, Jezreel Valley, a subsidiary of United Cable Television Corporation of Denver and the local aDiscount Investment Corporation.
- Cable Systems Media: Bat Yam and Kiryat Shmona, owned by the Ma'ariv Dankner groups and an unidentified US shareholder
- Israel Cable Services: Beersheba-Dimona-Yeruham-Arad, Rehovot, Acre and Nahariya, owned by Malarkey-Taylor Association of Washington D.C., Omega Communications of Indianapolis, Harcourt Investments and the Dagon Mamgurot Corporation
- Arutzi Zehav (Golden Channels): Jerusalem, Petah Tikva, Ramat Gan and Beit She'an, owned by Aurec (local franchisee of the Yellow Pages as Golden Pages), Yedioth Aharonoth (20%) and Tadiran (20%). Large numbers of Jerusalem Haredis and Arabs were not expected to subscribe despite a high potential
- Gvanim: Rishon le-Zion, Carmiel and Ma'alot, one third of the company was owned by Rediffusion Switzerland
- Cablenet: Haifa, Partly owned by Tonna-Saditel Electronics (France) and Minim Cables

=== As Hot ===
The company was founded on 18 August 2003 as merger of the three national cable companies in Israel: Matav, Tevel and Golden Channels that can be directly linked to the growing competition of the local satellite television provider Yes. While these companies had pursued a union since the late 1990s in order to save administrative and content purchasing costs, and especially after Yes was founded in order to stop it before it could grow, the Israeli government monopoly regulator had denied it until Yes had grown at least a minimum subscriber base. The three original companies had not competed with each other since each had been regulated with specific cities and regions.

Hot offers about 200 local and foreign-language channels in its digital television services. It also offers several exclusive channels under the Hot brand name. In addition to the digital television services, Hot provided an analog television service until an unknown date, despite plans to abandon it by 2012, but it has already disconnected the analog service in many areas including central Israel, in favor of digital signals. Many HOT subscribers must now have a decoder box to view broadcasts.

Not long after it was created, Hot began offering local telecom service using VoIP, a voice-over-internet technology and internet access services as well. Hot is not an Internet service provider and is only permitted to offer last-mile access. As of 2006, Hot had about 950,000 customers; 60% using the digital television services, over 400,000 using the internet services and over 100,000 using the phone services.

As of late 2005, Hot offered a wide VOD service, offering content from almost all channels and content that is not broadcast by other companies.

In 2009, businessman Patrick Drahi increased his stake in the company. Drahi completed the takeover in 2011, and offered to buy the remaining shares in 2012. As a result, Hot is a part of Drahi's company, Altice Europe NV, as of 2018.

In December 2010, Hot received a license to operate as an Internet service provider in the form of a subsidiary. In February 2021, Israel's Ministry of Communications approved Hot's NIS 170 million investment in the fiber-optic infrastructure venture IBC, subject to a number of antitrust conditions.

In 2018, Hot started broadcasting Kan 11 at 4K resolution for the first time via channel 511.

== Criticism ==
Hot has been criticized for refusing to provide service to certain areas of Israel, despite being bound by contract to do so. Regions especially lacking are those that are predominantly Haredi and Arab-Israeli, as well as the Arava. Hot responded that it already provided service for 95–98% of the country, and sought an official exemption from providing them to certain areas, where the decision lies with the Communications Ministry.

=== Customer service ===
Hot has been accused of using extortionist tactics in its customer service, including refusal to log customer requests to cancel service, and sending repeated bills after termination of service. Hot has been accused of racketeering and faces multiple class action suits.

Hot also used to be well known for the longest waiting times for customer service in Israel, they have been forced to reduce await times from hours to 3 minutes, and have the option for a callback.

=== Involvement in Israeli settlements ===
On 12 February 2020, the United Nations published a database of companies doing business related in the West Bank, including East Jerusalem, as well as in the occupied Golan Heights. Hot Telecom was listed on the database on account of its activities in Israeli settlements in these occupied territories, which the UN considers illegal under international law.

In Israeli areas of the West Bank, known in Israel as Judea and Samaria, the cable company was Cabletech (כבלתק), based out of Ariel. The company used Golden Channels' infrastructure. In October 2003, it was testing cable telephony.

=== "Faster than Ronaldo" controversy ===
In February 2016, Hot released a commercial with Altice's then-brand ambassador, Portuguese footballer Cristiano Ronaldo, featuring three Israeli comedians touting Hot's 200MB speed. On Twitter and Facebook, this was seen with a negative lens from pro-Palestine supporters and Arab netizens, as well as allusions to the 2014 Gaza war. Within three days, the video amassed 130,000 views and a 2:1 dislike-like ratio.

== See also ==
- Hot 3 - The main channel of Hot, which airs US shows as well as original Israeli shows.
- Yes (company) - the competing satellite television provider.
- List of mobile network operators of Israel
