= The X Factor Israel season 1 =

Season of television series

The X Factor Israel
- Season 1
- Hosted by: Bar Refaeli
- Judges: Rami Fortis; Moshe Peretz; Shiri Maimon; Ivri Lider
- Winner: Rose Fostanes
- Runner-up: Eden Ben Zaken

Release
- Original network: Reshet
- Original release: October 26, 2013 – January 14, 2014

Season chronology
- Next → Season 2

The X Factor Israel is the Israeli version of the British television music competition The X Factor. Season 1 was first announced in late 2012. Auditions for the show began on March 5, 2013. Promos for the show started airing in early September. The first season started its run on Saturday, October 26, 2013. The show airs during prime time on Reshet network on Wednesdays and Saturdays. The season concluded on January 14, 2014.

== Judges and hosts ==
Season 1 judges and host

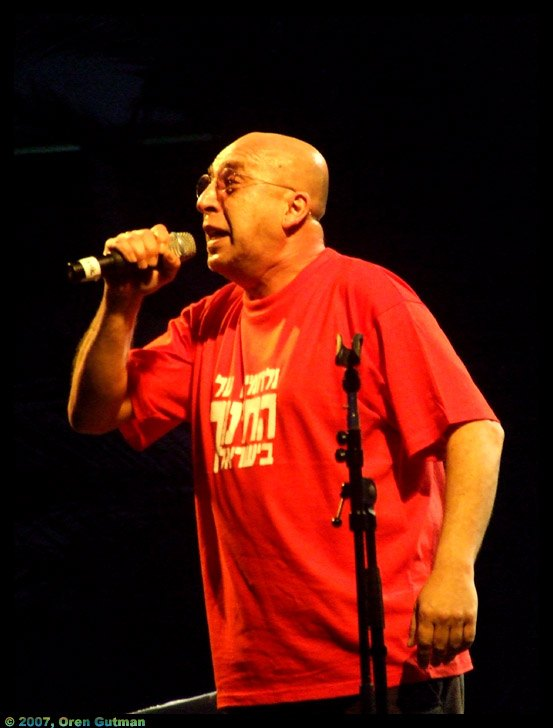
Rami Fortis

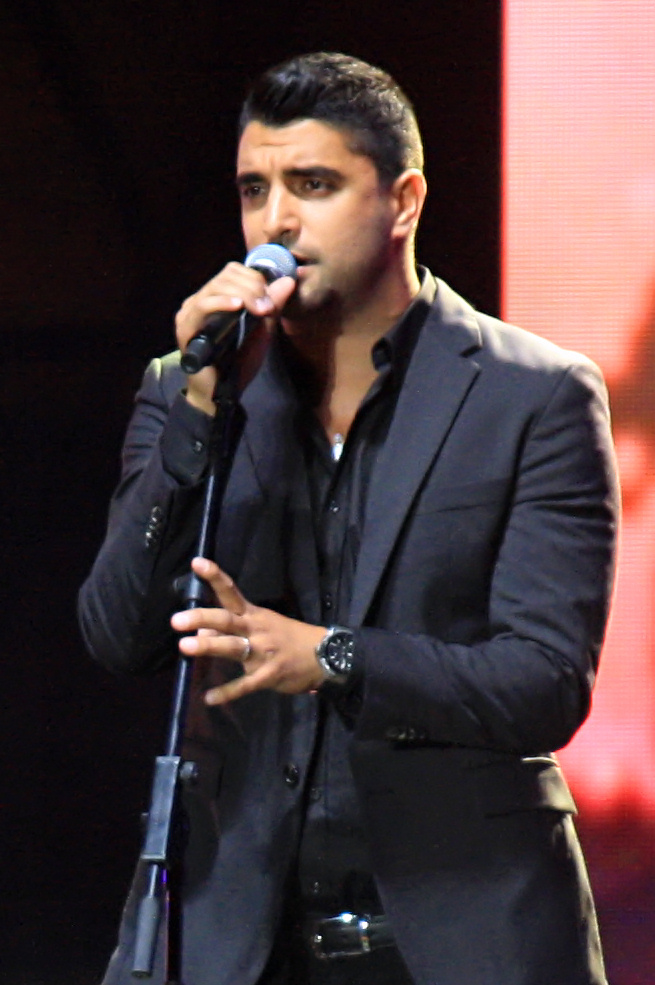
Moshe Peretz

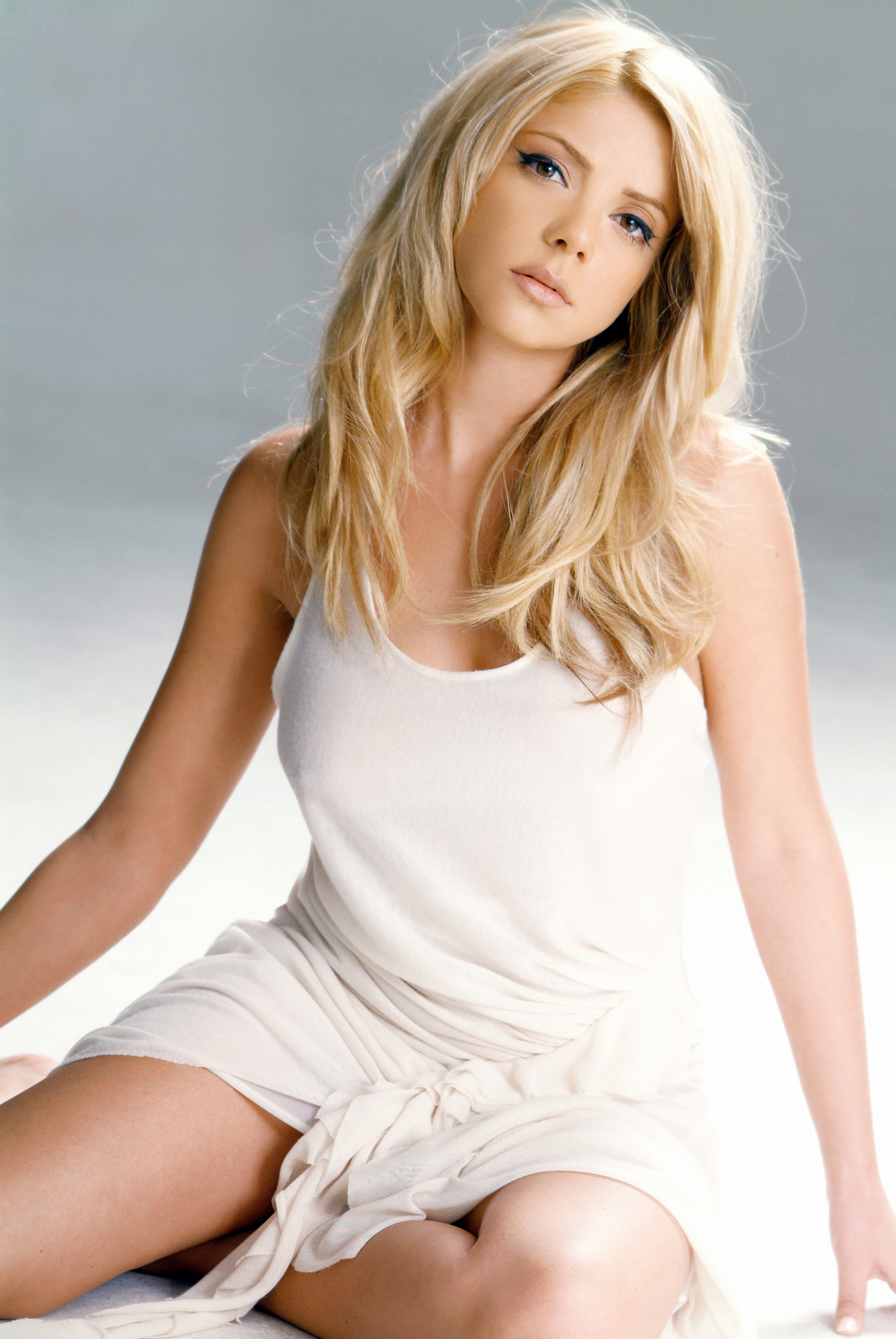
Shiri Maimon

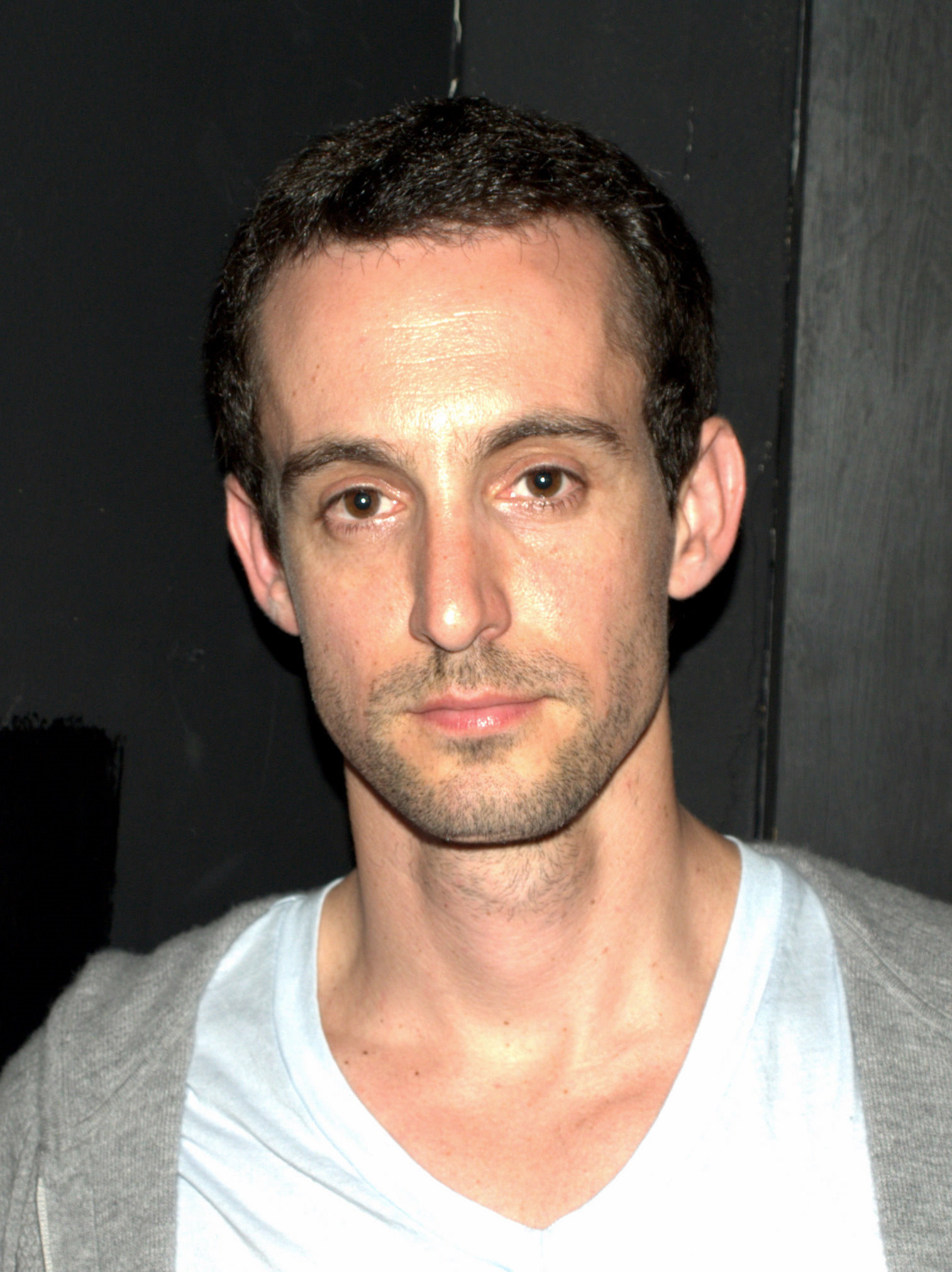
Ivri Lider

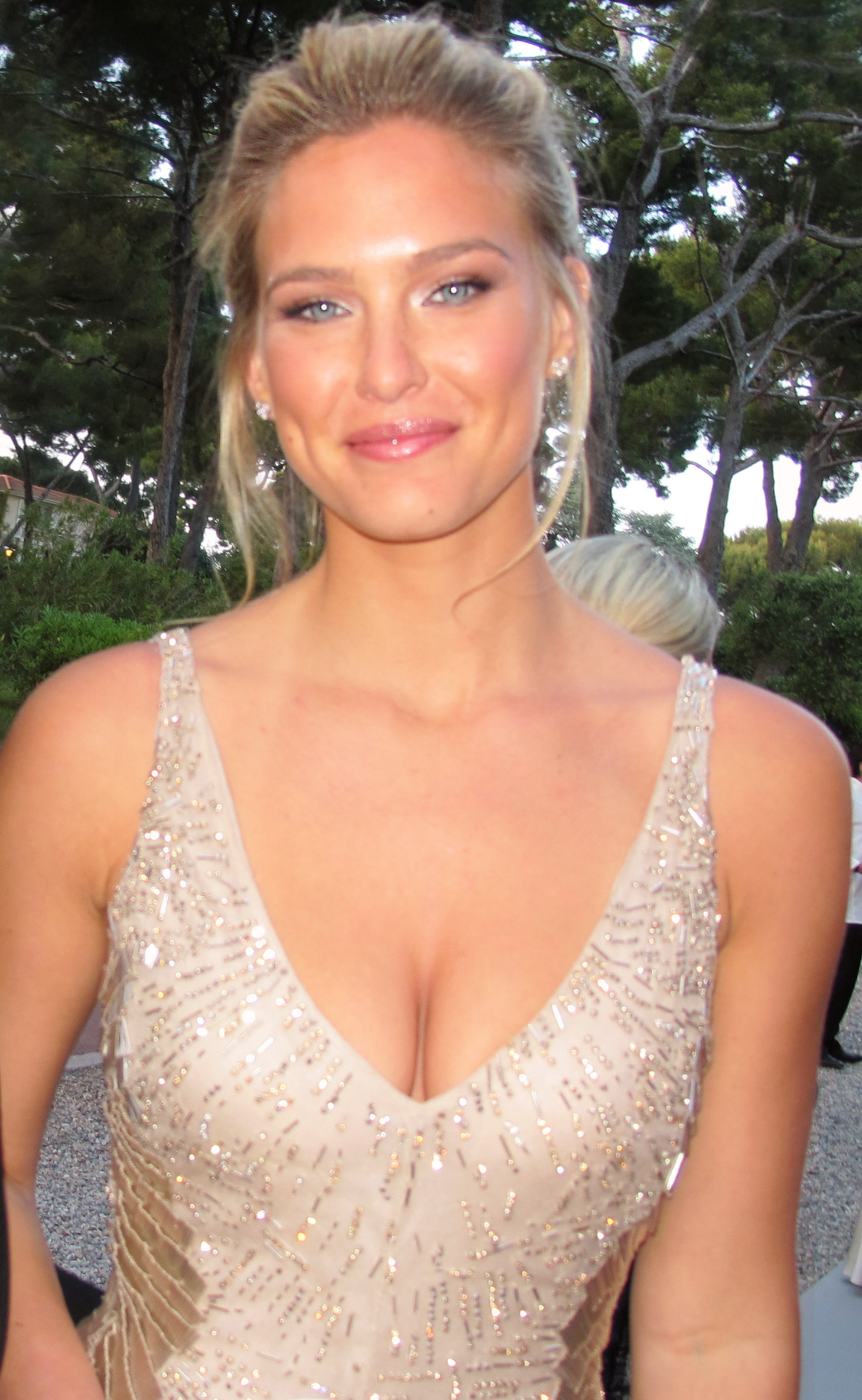
Bar Refaeli

In May 2013, it was announced that Bar Refaeli, an Israeli fashion model, will host the first season. Contrary to most other versions of the X Factor where the judges panels was a mixture of singers and music industry figures, the Israeli version was composed entirely of musicians. The judges panel for the first season was composed of the rock singer Rami Fortis, the pop singer-songwriter and composer Moshe Peretz, the pop and R&B singer Shiri Maimon, and the pop singer Ivri Lider.

== Contestants ==
Key:

– Winner
– Runner-up
– Third Place

Category (mentor)	Acts		
Boys (Peretz)	Ori Shakiv	Ben Golan	Yahav Tavasi
Girls (Fortis)	Eden Ben Zaken	Inbal Bibi	Tamar Friedman
Over 25s (Maimon)	Avishachar Jackson	Neta Rad	Rose Fostanes
Groups (Lider)	Tommy & Yan	Carakukli Sisters	Fusion

== Selection process ==
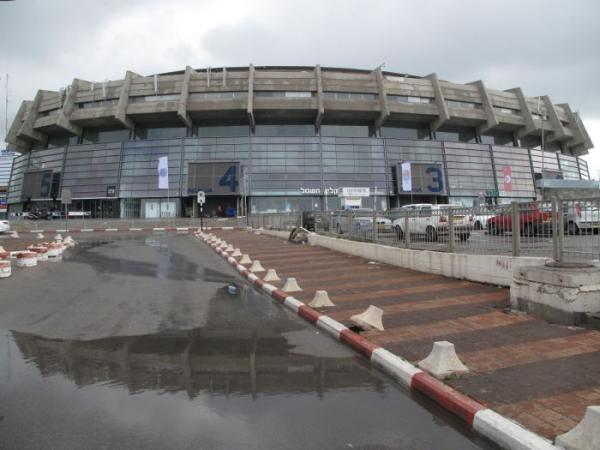
Nokia Arena

Auditions began on March 5, 2013. Auditions were open to all ages. Entries must pass three auditions in front of the producers in order to get to perform in front of the judges and live audience. Selected best, worst, and most bizarre auditions typically move on to the judges stage. Judging took place in Nokia Arena, Tel Aviv.

=== Bootcamp ===
Following the judges audition stage, 80 competitors entered the boot camp stage of the X factor. Following an initial round of auditions half of the contests were eliminated. The remaining acts had to perform a second audition in order to make it to the judges houses stage. 20 acts were collaboratively selected by the judges at the end of boot camp.

==== Twist ====
At the conclusion of bootcamp, a number of contestants from the boys category that were previously eliminated were called back into stage. The judges offered them a way back into the show as a group. The individual contestants were Edan Tamler, Adir Tov, Nadav Carni, Gustavo Quiñones, and Yuhan Buchnik. The band was eventually named Fusion.

=== Judges' Houses ===
Five acts were chosen for each of the four categories. In the judges house, two acts from each category were eliminated. The top 12 contestants continued on for the live shows.

Key:

– Eliminated in the judges' house

Top 20 - Judges' houses
Category (mentor)	Acts				
Boys (Peretz)	Ori Shakiv	Ben Golan	Yahav Tavasi	Liav Azran	Lior Deri
Girls (Fortis)	Maya Emma Sharkey Gabay	Eden Ben Zaken	Inbal Bibi	Inbal Ben-Shitrit	Tamar Friedman
Groups (Lider)	Apocalypsa	Carakukli Sisters	Tommy & Yan	Mirage	Fusion
Over 25s (Maimon)	Avishachar Jackson	Danielle Bitton	Maurizio Scaglioni	Neta Rad	Rose Fostanes

== Live shows ==
Live shows began on December 18, 2013.

=== Results summary ===
Color key

–	Contestant was in the bottom two/three; judges eliminate one based on majority vote (no final showdown)
–	Contestant was in the bottom two/three; contestant had to sing again in the final showdown
–	Contestant was in the bottom two/three; received the fewest votes and was immediately eliminated

Weekly results per contestant
Contestant	Week 1		Week 2		Week 3		Week 4
Contestant	Wednesday	Saturday	Wednesday	Saturday	Sunday	Tuesday	Tuesday
Rose Fostanes	Safe	Safe	Safe	Safe	Safe	Safe	1st
Eden Ben Zaken	Safe	Safe	Safe	Safe	Safe	Bottom two	2nd
Ori Shakiv	Safe	Safe	Safe	Safe	Safe	Safe	3rd
Fusion	Safe	Safe	Bottom three	Bottom two	Bottom two	Safe	4th
Inbal Bibi	Bottom two	Safe	Safe	Safe	Safe	5th	Eliminated (week 3, Tuesday)
Tamar Friedman	Safe	Safe	Safe	Safe	Bottom two	Eliminated (week 3, Sunday)	
Tommy & Yan	Safe	Safe	Safe	Safe	7th	Eliminated (week 3, Sunday)	
Avishachar Jackson	Safe	Bottom two	Safe	Bottom two	Eliminated (week 2, Saturday)		
Carakukli Sisters	Safe	Safe	Bottom three	Eliminated (week 2, Wednesday)			
Ben Golan	Safe	Safe	10th	Eliminated (week 2, Wednesday)			
Yahav Tavasi	Safe	Bottom two	Eliminated (week 1, Saturday)				
Neta Rad	Bottom two	Eliminated (week 1, Wednesday)					

=== Live show details ===
==== Week 1 ====
===== Wednesday (December 18) =====
- Group performance: "Love Me Again"

Week 1 Wednesday results
Contestant	Order	Song	Results
Carakukli Sisters	1	"I Kissed a Girl"	Safe
Tamar Friedman	2	"Skyfall"	Safe
Avishachar Jackson	3	"Girl on Fire"	Safe
Ori Shakiv	4	"רוב השעות"	Safe
Tommy & Yan	5	"מה אם נתנשק"	Safe
Eden Ben Zaken	6	"Listen"	Safe
Neta Rad	7	"ג'סיקה"	Eliminated
Yahav Tavasi	8	"אמסטרדם"	Safe
Fusion	9	"הראשונה" & "Mirrors" (Note: The group sang a remix of the English and Hebrew songs mirrors and "הראשונה")	Safe
Ben Golan	10	"אהובתי"	Safe
Inbal Bibi	11	"בחום של תל אביב"	Bottom Two
Rose Fostanes	12	"Beautiful"	Safe

===== Saturday (December 21) =====
Week 1 Saturday results
Contestant	Order	Song	Results
Fusion	1	"Some Nights"	Safe
Yahav Tavasi	2	"שלג בשרב"	Eliminated
Tamar Friedman	3	"Go Your Own Way"	Safe
Avishachar Jackson	4	"כמה אהבה"	Bottom Two
Tommy & Yan	5	"The Other Side"	Safe
Inbal Bibi	6	"Beat It"	Safe
Ben Golan	7	"Titanium"	Safe
Rose Fostanes	8	"Valerie"	Safe
Carakukli Sisters	9	"מגדלור"	Safe
Ori Shakiv	10	"עכשיו או לעולם"	Safe
Eden Ben Zaken	11	"Bad Romance"	Safe

==== Week 2 ====
===== Wednesday (December 25) =====
- Group performance: "Give Me Everything"
- The contestant, Hillik Cohen, that has failed passing the live auditions and was highly aggressive toward the judges made a guest appearance and performed "אני כאן" after the group performance.

Week 2 Wednesday results
Contestant	Order	Song	Results
Avishachar Jackson	1	"The Edge of Glory"	Safe
Ben Golan	2	"כמו אז"	Eliminated
Carakukli Sisters	3	"נוסעת בעקבות האהבה"	Eliminated
Tamar Friedman	4	"אם יש גן עדן"	Safe
Fusion	5	"Wrecking Ball"	Bottom Three
Ori Shakiv	6	"מעליות"	Safe
Rose Fostanes	7	"I (Who Have Nothing)"	Safe
Eden Ben Zaken	8	"אני לא יכולה בלעדיך"	Safe
Tommy & Yan	9	"על הגשר הישן"	Safe
Inbal Bibi	10	"ניסים"	Safe

===== Saturday (December 28) =====
Week 2 Saturday results
Contestant	Order	Song	Results
Tamar Friedman	1	"ואת"	Safe
Avishachar Jackson	2	"Lately"	Bottom Two
Inbal Bibi	3	"Where Is The Love"	Safe
Ori Shakiv	4	"תביני" (Note: "תביני" is an original song written by Ori Shakiv himself.)	Safe
Fusion	5	"חופשי זה לגמרי לבד"	Bottom Two
Eden Ben Zaken	6	"איזה יום"	Safe
Rose Fostanes	7	"Born This Way"	Safe
Tommy & Yan	8	"Little Things"	Safe
Final showdown details
Avishachar Jackson	1	"משהו ממני"	Eliminated
Fusion	2	"Let Her Go"	Safe

==== Week 3 ====
===== Sunday (January 5) - Quarter-final =====
- Group performance "הכוס הכחולה". The performance included the Carakukli Sisters and Ivri Lider.

Week 3 Sunday results
Contestant	Order	Song	Results
Fusion	1	"Say Something"	Bottom Three
Inbal Bibi	2	"צל כבד"	Safe
Tommy & Yan	3	"Viva La Vida"	Eliminated
Ori Shakiv	4	"עוד"	Safe
Eden Ben Zaken	5	"Love On Top"	Safe
Rose Fostanes	6	"Bohemian Rhapsody"	Safe
Tamar Friedman	7	"Royals"	Bottom Three
Final showdown details
Tamar Friedman	1	"גשם כבד"	Eliminated
Fusion	2	"Mirrors"	Safe

===== Tuesday (January 7) - Semi-final =====
- Group performance "Wake Me Up".
- The boys and Moshe Peretz performed "אולי הלילה".
- The over 25s, including those who were previously eliminated, and Shiri Maimon performed "חלק ממך" and "Now That You're Gone".

Week 3 Tuesday results
Contestant	Order	Song	Results
Rose Fostanes	1	"Because of You"	Safe
Inbal Bibi	2	"Oops!... I Did It Again"	Eliminated
Ori Shakiv	3	"תרצי בי"	Safe
Fusion	4	"Roar"	Safe
Eden Ben Zaken	5	"כמה פעמים"	Bottom 2

==== Week 4 ====
===== Tuesday (January 14) - Final =====
- Group performance "Scream & Shout". Performance included all the original top 12 contestants
- Judges performance "America" (Hebrew: "אמריקה")

Week 4 Tuesday results
Contestant	Order	Song	Results
Ori Shakiv	1	"Todah" (Hebrew: "תודה")	3rd
Eden Ben Zaken	2	"Only Girl (in the World)"	2nd
Fusion	3	"Sweet Dreams" & "Party Rock Anthem"	Eliminated
Rose Fostanes	4	"My Way"	Winner
Judge & Contestant Duet
Rose Fostanes Shiri Maimon	1	"If I Ain't Got You"	Winner
Eden Ben Zaken Rami Fortis	2	"Nitzotzot" (Hebrew: "ניצוצות")	2nd
Ori Shakiv Moshe Peretz	3	"Latet ve Lachachat" (Hebrew: "לתת ולקחת")	3rd

== Ratings ==
The first episode peaked at 49%, about 1.1 million viewers, making it the highest figure for opening episode of any Israeli music program. The show had an average rating of 38.4% of households.

Episode	Air Date	Viewers (thousands)	Share	Source
Auditions 1	Oct 26, 2013	1,100	49%	
Auditions 2	Oct 30, 2013	913	49.4%	
Auditions 3	Nov 2, 2013	1,094	51.4%	
Auditions 4	Nov 6, 2013	870	49.5%	
Auditions 5	Nov 9, 2013	953	47.5%	
Auditions 6	Nov 13, 2013	927	51.8%	
Auditions 7	Nov 16, 2013	1,107	54.2%	
Auditions 8	Nov 20, 2013	901	49.9%	
Bootcamp 1	Nov 23, 2013	955	51.1%	
Bootcamp 2	Nov 28, 2013	832	30.7%	
Judges' houses 1	Nov 30, 2013	710	29.7%	
Judges' houses 2	Dec 4, 2013	798	42.6%	
Judges' houses 3	Dec 7, 2013	745.2	40.5%	
Judges' houses 4	Dec 11, 2013			
Connect to X	Dec 14, 2013			
Live Shows 1	Dec 18, 2013	804	45.4%	
Live Shows 2	Dec 21, 2013	870	44.2%	
Live Shows 3	Dec 25, 2013	849.3	47.3%	
Live Shows 4	Dec 28, 2013	906	47.2%	
Quarter-final	Jan 5, 2014			
Semi-final	Jan 7, 2014			
The road to the final	Jan 13, 2014			
Final	Jan 14, 2014	1,040	55.7%	
