= Shiri Maimon =

Israeli musician and actress (born 1981)

Shiri Maimon שירי מימון
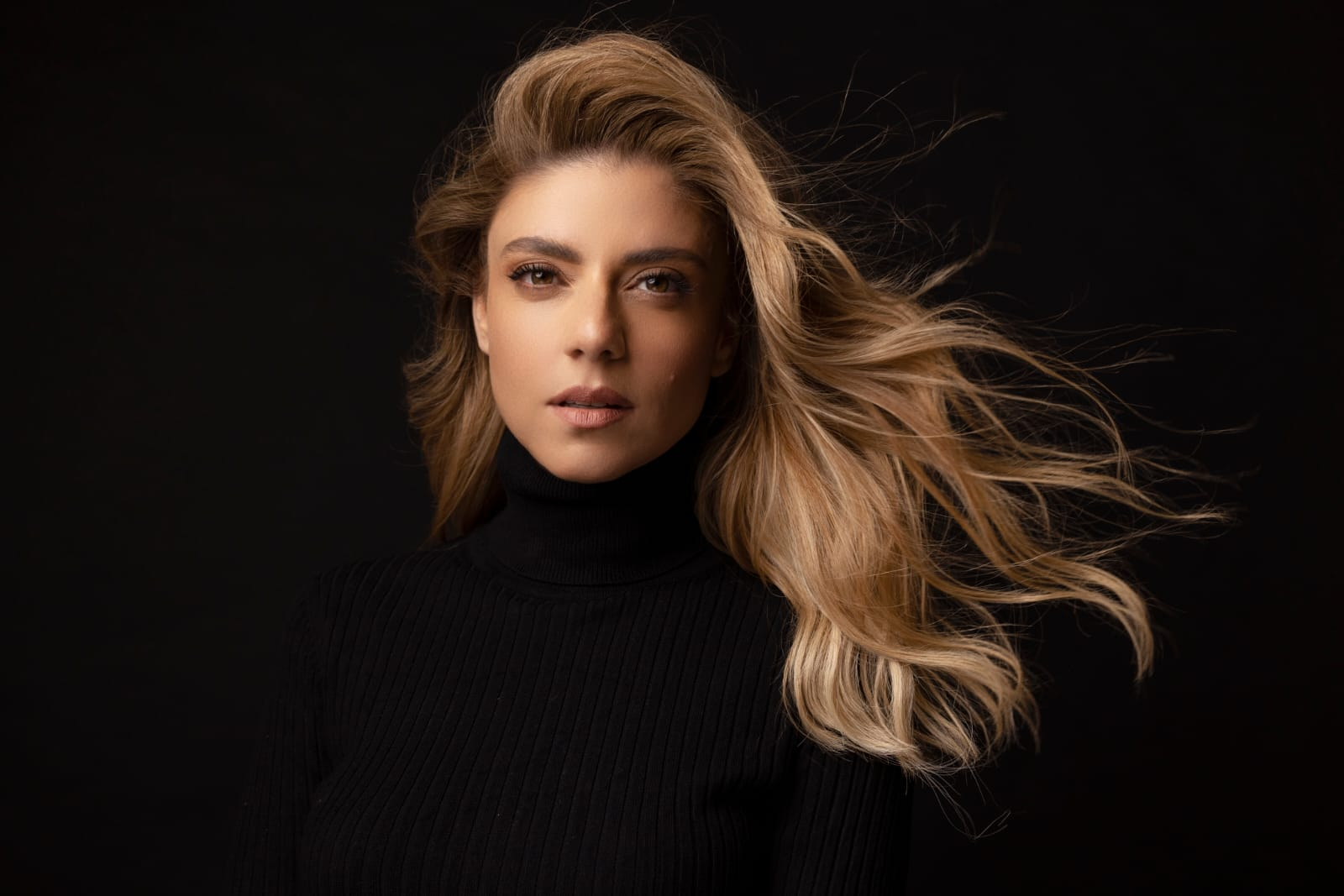
- Maimon in 2022

Background information
- Also known as: Shiri Maymon
- Born: 17 May 1981 (age 45); Haifa, Israel
- Origin: Israel
- Genres: Pop; soul; R&B
- Occupations: Singer, actress, television host
- Years active: 2003–present
- Label: Helicon

Shiri Maimon (or Maymon; Hebrew: שִׁירִי מַיְמוֹן, [ˈʃiʁi majˈmon]; born 17 May 1981) is an Israeli singer, television personality and actress, who rose to fame as the runner-up in the inaugural season of singing reality competition Kokhav Nolad. She is known for representing Israel at the Eurovision Song Contest 2005, where she came fourth.

In 2008, Maimon won Best Israeli Act and performed in the MTV Europe Music Awards, where she was also nominated for Europe's Favorite Act. In June 2013, Maimon became one of the judges for the first season of The X Factor Israel. She continued her role for the second and third seasons. In 2018, it was revealed that Maimon would leave the show in favor of the rival network show, Rising Star Israel.

In 2018, Maimon made a starring replacement in the role of Roxie Hart in the Broadway show Chicago. In February 2024, she recorded a live album of greatest hits accompanied by the Israel Philharmonic Orchestra.

== Early life and career ==
=== 1981–2002: Early life ===
Maimon was born in the city of Haifa, Israel; and raised in the neighborhood of Kiryat Haim. Maimon family is of both Mizrahi Jewish and Sephardi Jewish descent, both of her parents were born in Israel, in a podcast interview it was revealed that her family roots are from Syria and Algeria. Her parents are Mazal and Natan Maimon, and she has an older brother named Rami, an older sister named Livnat, and a younger brother named Asaf. In Hebrew, her first name could mean either "sing" (in imperative mood) or "my song".

Maimon made her debut at the age of ten, when she performed at the Festigal as one of the Festival's children, and sang the song "BeChol Matzav" ("In Any Way") by Si Heiman. At the age of 12, she joined a children's music band called "Tehila". Maimon was also a presenter on the community channel for several times. In high school, she was a member of the band of one of the national youth organizations (HaNoar HaOved VeHaLomed) in her hometown.

After graduating high school, Maimon was enlisted as a soldier into the Israel Defense Forces (IDF), where she sang with the Israeli Air Force Band (as well as first met director Tzvika Hadar, who later became the host of the reality show Kokhav Nolad).

In 2001, she was featured on a music video by the band Teapacks called "Ilu Hait" ("If You Were"). Later, she worked a year and a half as a singer, dancer, and bartender, at a nightclub in the southmost Israeli city of Eilat. She enrolled in Beit Zvi school of the Performing Arts, but left a short time after when she found out that she passed the auditions to the reality show Kokhav Nolad.

=== 2003–2004: Breakthrough on Kokhav Nolad ===
In 2003 Maimon auditioned for the first season of singing talent show Kokhav Nolad (Tzvika Hadar, the host of the show and one of the judges during the auditions stage, removed himself from judging her audition due to their previous acquaintance). She passed the auditions and made it to the show team. In the head-to-head stage of the show, Maimon sang "Atuf BeRahamim" ("Covered With Mercy") by Rita, and passed to the semi-finals. Maimon participated in the first semi-final, where she sang "Kshe’at Atzuva" ("When You're Sad") by Amir Benayoun, and won the first place, which secured her participation in the final. In the big final, that took place at the music festival at the Nitzanim Beach, Maimon sang "Don Quixote" from the Maganuna album by Dana International and finished in the second place, receiving more than 400,000 votes.

The show gained much popularity among the Israeli audience, and many of the performances of the show, including Maimon's, were played intensively on the radio. The three finalists, Maimon included, gained publicity and a massive coverage in the press, which resulted in their breakthrough the mainstream Israeli music industry.

In December 2003, while working on her debut album, Maimon joined one of the most popular daily youth TV program in Israel, EXIT as a host. She was one of the main presenters cast, until her resigning from the show in October 2005.

In 2004, Maimon recorded a duet with Ran Danker, "Kama Koakh Yesh LeLev Shavur" ("How Much Power Does a Broken Heart Have") – the Hebrew version of "La fuerza corazón" – as part of the soundtrack of the Hebrew version of the movie El Cid: The Legend.

In the same year, Maimon collaborated with Shlomi Shabat, when they performed together on one of his shows in Caesarea, singing one of his songs as a duet, "Bechol Makom" ("Anywhere"). The live performance was played on the radio, and was released on several of Shabat's CDs and DVDs.

In November 2004 Maimon released her first single, "Ad SheTavin Oti" ("Until You'll Understand Me"), while working on her debut album. The single gained average success in the radio charts.

In December 2004 she participated in the original Israeli children's musical theatre Mamma Mia.

=== 2005–2007: Eurovision and Shiri Maimon ===
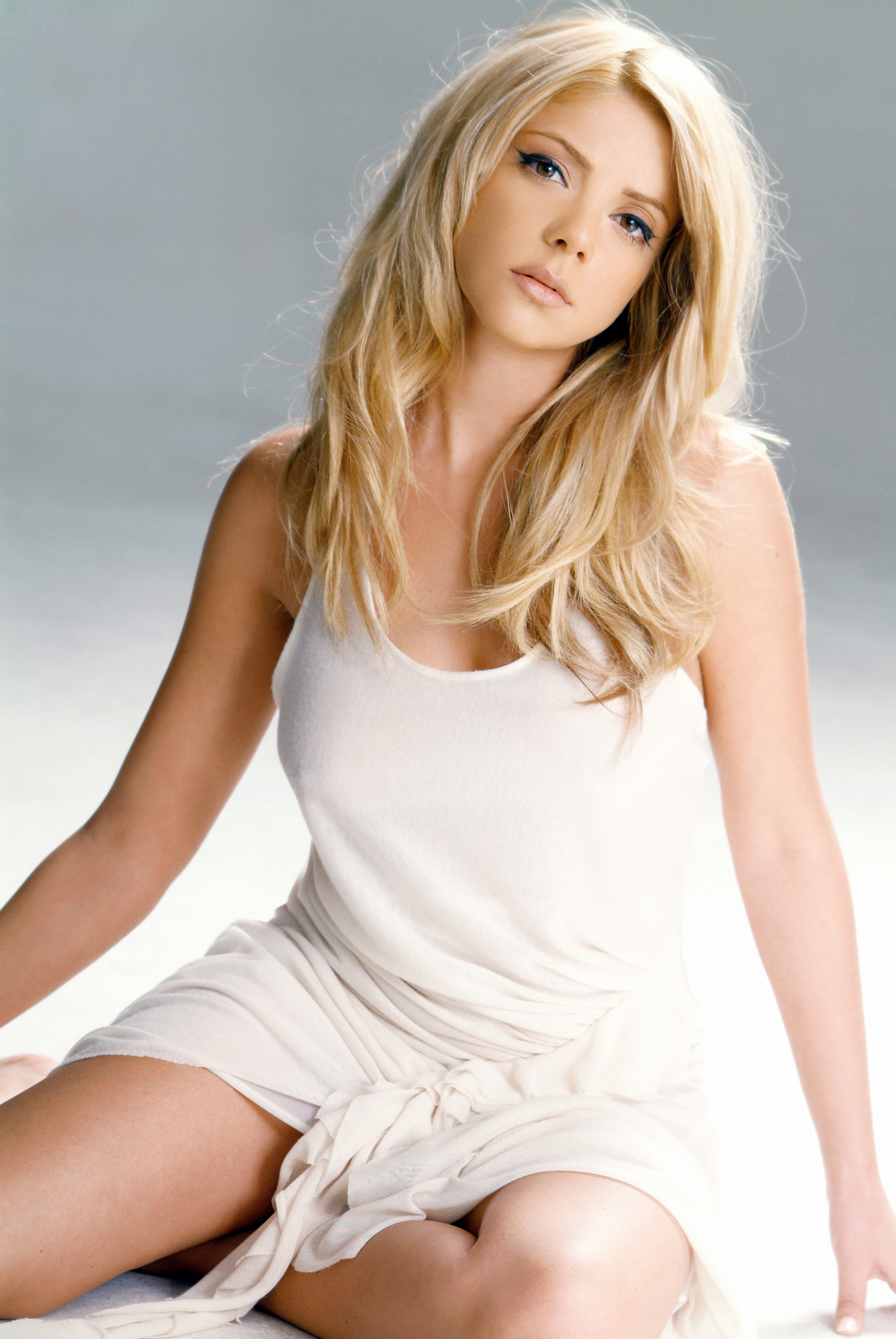
Shiri Maimon, 2005

In 2005, Maimon was offered to take part in the Kdam Eurovision, Israel's Eurovision selection show. Maimon chose to enter the competition with her second single, "HaSheket SheNish’ar" ("The Silence That Remains"), which was released to the radio on 15 February, together with the rest of the competing songs. On 2 March Maimon won the first place in the competition with an overwhelming victory, winning 116 points out of 120 possible, and became Israel's representative at the Eurovision Song Contest 2005 in Kyiv. Maimon produced a music video to the song, inspired by the movie The Bodyguard. Initially, the Israeli music channel was prevented from broadcasting the music video due to its many hidden advertisements. Maimon's managers explained the reason for the many hidden advertisements with funding difficulties, as the IBA network refused to participate in funding of the music video. The music video eventually received a special permission to be broadcast on the channel. Another controversy occurred when an anonymous artist claimed copyrights over the composition of the song. The artist petitioned the court for injunction, in order to prevent the song from being sent to the Eurovision. The court rejected the artist's petition, and the conflict was later settled in an agreement whose details are unknown to the public. While preparing for the Eurovision, Maimon recorded an English version of the song, called "Time To Say Goodbye". Maimon eventually decided to perform the song half in Hebrew and half in English on the Eurovision stage. Despite low betting odds, Maimon was placed seventh in the semi-final, which was held on 19 May, and qualified for the final. In the final, which was held on 21 May, she was placed fourth in the contest, winning 154 points. The winner, however, was Greece's Helena Paparizou and her song "My Number One".

Maimon's participation in the Eurovision gained much attention from the Israeli public. Her qualification for the final, and her final achievement, were intensively covered by the Israeli news media, and her performance received praised reviews from the Israeli audience. With the exception of Eurovision 1999 (that was held in Jerusalem), Maimon's performance in the Eurovision gained the highest ratings for a Eurovision broadcast in Israel since the beginning of the ratings measurement in the country (in February 1998), reaching 47.9% at the peak. In addition, "HaSheket SheNish’ar" was ranked at number 1 on the year-end charts ("The Song of the Year") of Reshet Gimmel and other different radio stations. In early 2006 the song was also announced the most played song in the Israeli radio in 2005. Maimon's performance in the Eurovision helped to shift her public image from a reality show celebrity to a serious singer, and based her position as a musician in the Israeli music industry.

In March 2005, shortly after she became Israel's representative at the Eurovision, Maimon was chosen to sing the Israeli anthem before a FIFA World Cup qualification match against Ireland.

In July 2005, two months after participating in the Eurovision, Maimon released her third single, "Ahava Ktana" ("A Little Love"), that gained high success in the radio charts.

In August 2005, Maimon performed in the final of the third season of Kokhav Nolad, reuniting with the 8 other finalists of all the seasons of the show, singing a medley of "HaSheket SheNish’ar" and "Ahava Ktana".

In September 2005, Maimon released her eponymous debut album, Shiri Maimon. In February 2006, on the launch event of her new show tour, Maimon received a gold album award after the album went gold, selling over 20,000 copies.

Maimon won the "Person of the Year in Music" award in the "Persons of the Year" awards ceremony. Maimon also won the title "The Singer of the Year" In the year-end charts of Reshet Gimmel and other different radio stations.

In October 2005 Maimon released her fourth single, "Kama Pe’amim" ("How Many Times"), that gained good success in the radio charts.

Also in October 2005, Maimon resigned from presenting the popular daily youth TV program EXIT, where she had been one of the main presenters cast for almost two years.

In December 2005 Maimon participated in the Festigal for the second time, this time as a guest star, singing parts of the theme song "Gibor Al HaOlam" ("A Hero on the World") – a Hebrew version of "Holding Out for a Hero" – as well as three of her album songs: "HaSheket SheNish’ar", "Ahava Ktana" and "Le’an SheLo Telchi".

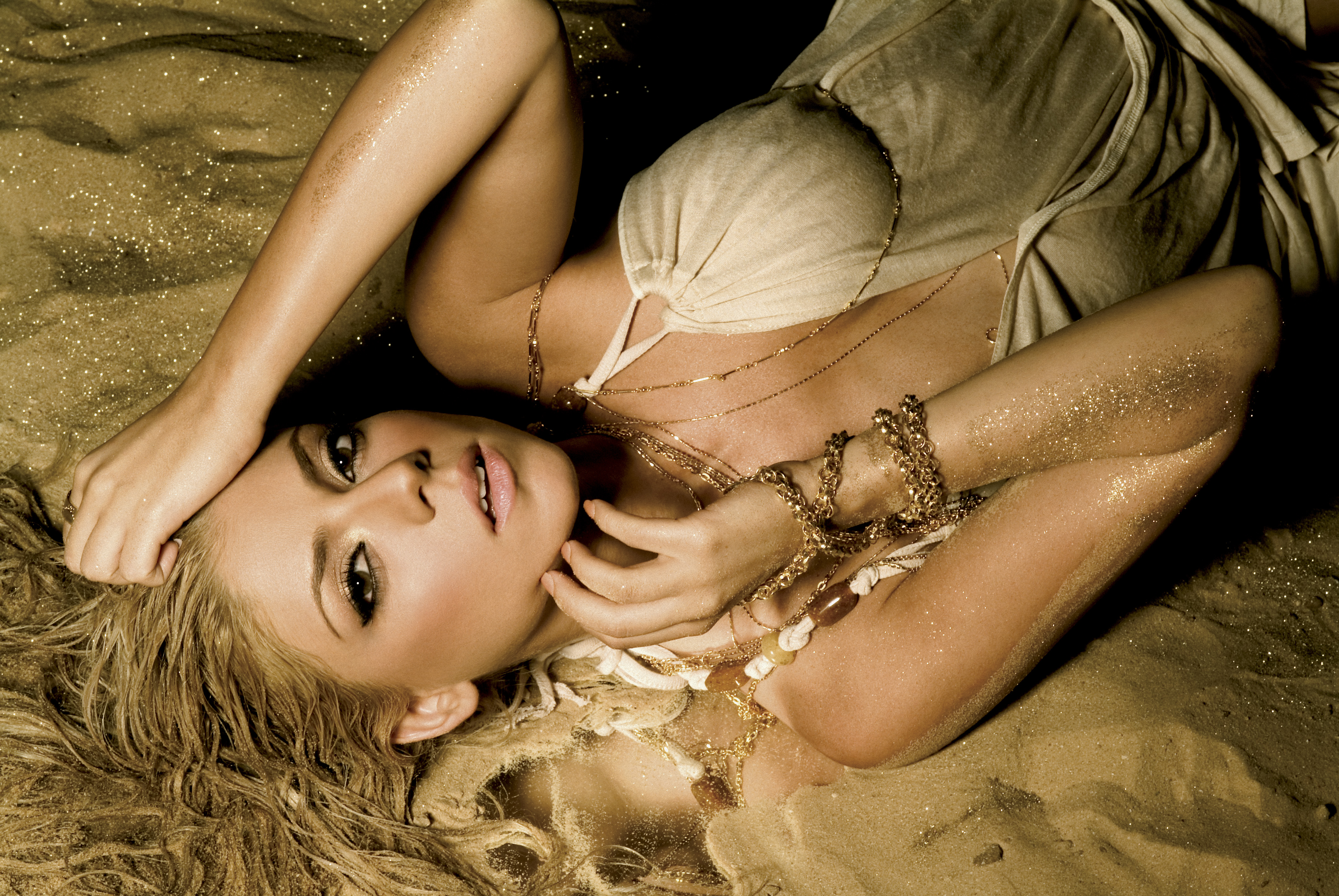
Maimon in 2005

In January 2006 Maimon released her fifth single, "Le’an SheLo Telchi" ("Wherever You'll Go"), that gained good success in the radio charts.

In March 2006, Maimon appeared on the soap opera Yeladot Ra'ot ("Bad Girls") on the Israeli Music Channel, where she played the role of Maya Gold, a talented singer and recording star trying to balance her career and her love life with caring for her drug addicted brother.

Also in March 2006, Maimon made a guest appearance at the Kdam Eurovision 2006 as the previous year winner, singing "Le’an SheLo Telchi" (in Henree's Drum Machine Mix version).

In May 2006, she began starring in a musical version of an Israeli cult movie "HaLehaka" ("The Band") in the Habima theater. She played the role of Noa, originally played by Dafna Armoni. The musical closed in November 2007, after around 200 performances and 100,000 viewers.

In September 2006, the movie No Exit was released, starred Maimon and the rest presenters cast of Exit.

In June 2007, Maimon performed with The Jerusalem Symphony Orchestra, in a tribute concert to Elvis Presley and Frank Sinatra. She sang a medley of Presley and Sinatra's songs as well as three of her own songs.

Her first single from her second album was released in December 2007, entitled "Yoter Tov Lisloach" ("Better to Forgive"), and gained good success in the radio charts.

=== 2008–2009: Rega Lifney She... and MTV Music Awards ===
In January 2008, her second album Rega Lifney She... ("Just Before ...") was released. In the same time, Maimon released her first international album, "Standing on My Own". While the Hebrew album was available in Israel both on the record stores and for cellular download to Orange subscribers, the international album was available only via Orange. The international album was eventually shelved less than a year later.

In February 2008, Maimon released the second single from the album, called "KsheHalachta" ("When You Were Gone"), that gained average success in the radio charts, and became a popular song in memorial days.

In March 2008, Maimon released the third single from the album, called "Tohavi Ktzat Et Atzmekh" ("Love Yourself A Little"), that didn't gain much success in the radio charts.

In May 2008 Maimon started her new show tour.

In June 2008, Maimon released the fourth single from the album, called "VeRatziti SheTed’i" ("And I Wanted You To Know"). The song's music video sparked some controversy for featuring a kiss between Maimon and another woman. Nevertheless, the song didn't gain much success in the radio charts.

In September 2008 Maimon won the title "The Singer of the Year" from The Israeli Children Channel "Arutz HaYeladim" and from the Israeli teen magazine "Rosh1".

In October 2008 Maimon won the "Best Israeli Act" at the MTV Europe Music Awards. Later on, in November 2008, Maimon was voted to be among the top 5 favorite regional acts, which made her one of the five nominees in the "Europe's Favorite Act" category. Maimon released a new single that was written especially for the event, called "Chelek Mimcha" ("Part of You") in the Hebrew version and "Now That You're Gone" in the English version. she went to Liverpool, where she performed the song in its English version. In the "Europe's Favourite Act" category, she finished in 3rd place, before the winner of the Eurovision Song Contest 2008 Dima Bilan, and the British singer Leona Lewis.

In December 2008 Maimon participated in the Festigal for the third time, this time as a competitor, singing parts of the theme song "Tfos Ta’Festigal" ("Catch The Festigal") – a Hebrew version of "Can You Feel It" –, competing with the song "Ashir Lecha" ("I'll Sing For You) in the first act of the show, finishing in the second place, and singing her single "Chelek Mimcha" in the second act of the show.

In 2009, in the wake of her MTV Europe Music Awards participation, Maimon was also chosen to take part in the EMI's Global One project, a worldwide project produced by Rob Hoffman, where 35 successful artists from five different continents recorded songs in their native languages. The debut single from the project was called "Lately". Maimon recorded the Hebrew version of the song, "Tamshich Lalechet" ("Keep Walking"), which its lyrics she co-wrote with Israeli rapper Ortega, who was also featured in the song. The single was released in Israel in May 2009. Maimon also took part in the multi-language version of the song.

In August 2009 Maimon collaborated with Israeli DJ Skazi on the song "Ani Erdof Otcha" ("I Will Haunt You"), which was released as a single.

=== 2010–2012: The Show with Shimon Buskila and Sheleg BaSharav ===
In December 2009, Maimon announced her collaboration with Israeli singer Shimon Buskila. Maimon and Buskila met after Maimon was in the process of founding new materials for her new album, and asked Buskila to compose her a song. The connection between the two turned into a new show tour, with a set list consisted of songs by Maimon, songs by Buskila, songs that Buskila wrote or composed for other artists, and songs that are favored by them. In January 2010 the duo released a new single in order to promote the tour, "Geshem SheYavo" ("A Rain To Come"), an original song that was written for the project, that gained success in some radio charts. The song was included in the set list of the show. The tour started in March 2010, and kept running until mid 2012 for over 300 shows.

In March 2010, Maimon collaborated with Israeli singer Matti Caspi, when she was featured in his song "Samba BeShnaim" ("Samba For Two") – a Hebrew version of the Brazilian song "Samba em Prelúdio" –, which appeared on his new album "Nefesh Teoma" ("Soul Mate"). Previously, Maimon was a guest in Caspi's concert in Rishon LeZion festival in October 2009. After being featured in his song, Maimon performed as a guest on his shows in April 2010 and in August 2010, as well as performed in a concert dedicated to him in April 2011.

Also in March 2010, Maimon was chosen to be the endorser of Keren Hayesod organization, in a publicity campaign for the 90th anniversary of the organization in South and Central America. She went to perform in Latin America with her songs, as well as different Hebrew songs (such as "Yerushalaim Shel Zahav", "HaTikva" and "Shir LaShalom"), and different Spanish songs (such as Mercedes Sosa's) in Argentina (in venues such as the Gran Rex), Chile, Mexico, Brazil, Uruguay and more.

At Israel's Independence Day in 2010, she performed "Shir LaShalom" ("Song For Peace") live, a song considered to be the anthem of the Israeli peace movement.

In August 2010, for the 100th show of Maimon and Buskila's tour, a second single from Maimon and Buskila's project was released, "Shir Tikva" ("Hope Song"), that gained high success in the radio charts. The song was originally composed by Buskila and sung by Miri Mesika.

In March 2011, Maimon co-hosted the Kdam Eurovision 2011 alongside Aki Avni.

Also in March 2011, Maimon and Buskila released a live album, "HaMofa HaMeshutaf" ("The Joint Show"), which was recorded in one of their shows in December in Reading 3, and included 16 songs performed live. The 16 songs in the album composed only part of the set list, while other songs from the set list of the show were not included in the album. In September 2011 the album went gold, after selling over 30,000 copies, and in January 2013 the album went platinum, after selling over 40,000 copies.

In April 2011, a third single from Maimon and Buskila's project was released, "Ad Sof HaOlam" ("Until The end of the World"), for the promotion of their live album. The song was originally composed by Buskila and sung by Haim Moshe and Yoav Itzhak, and didn't gain much success in the radio charts.

In June 2011, the duo performed in front of 3,500 spectators on the reputed stage of The Roman Theatre of Caesarea, as well as in September 2011, June 2012, and July 2013.

In August 2011, the duo released a fourth single from their project, "Yamim Meusharim" ("Happy Days"), an original song that was written for the project, that didn't gain much success in the radio charts. The song was not included in the live album.

In September 2011, the duo won the title "The collaboration of the Year" In the year-end charts of Galgalatz, Reshet Gimmel and other different radio stations.

In May 2012, the duo released a fifth single from their project, "Kama Ahava" ("How Much Love"), which was originally composed by Buskila and sung by Kobi Peretz, and had a music video edited as a travel log. The song was released for the end of the duo's show tour, which until June 2012 had been running for more than 300 times. Though Maimon and Buskila officially announced the end of their show tour in 2012, they continued to perform together afterwards.

In June 2012, Maimon released her first single from her new solo album, "Sheleg BaSharav" ("Snow in the Heatwave"), that gained good success in the radio charts.

In July 2012, Maimon released her second single from her new solo album, "Mechaka SheTashuv" ("Waiting For You To Come Back"), that gained average success in the radio charts. The song's music video was released on 30 August.

In August 2012 Maimon released her new solo album, "Sheleg BaSharav" ("Snow in the Heatwave").

In September 2012, shortly after releasing her new solo album, Maimon released the third single from the album, "BeSof Yom" ("In The End of a Day").

In November 2012, Maimon released the fourth single from the album, "LaIsha SheHayta" ("To The Woman Who Used To Be").

In December 2012 Maimon participated in the Festigal for the fourth time, this time as a competitor, singing parts of the theme song "SPY Festigal Kadima" ("SPY Festigal Forward") – a Hebrew version of "Livin' la Vida Loca" –, competing with the song "Shara MeHaLev" ("Singing From The Heart") in the first act of the show, and singing a medley of her singles "Sheleg BaSharav" and "Shir Tikva" in the second act of the show, as well as participating in other parts of the show.

=== 2013–present ===
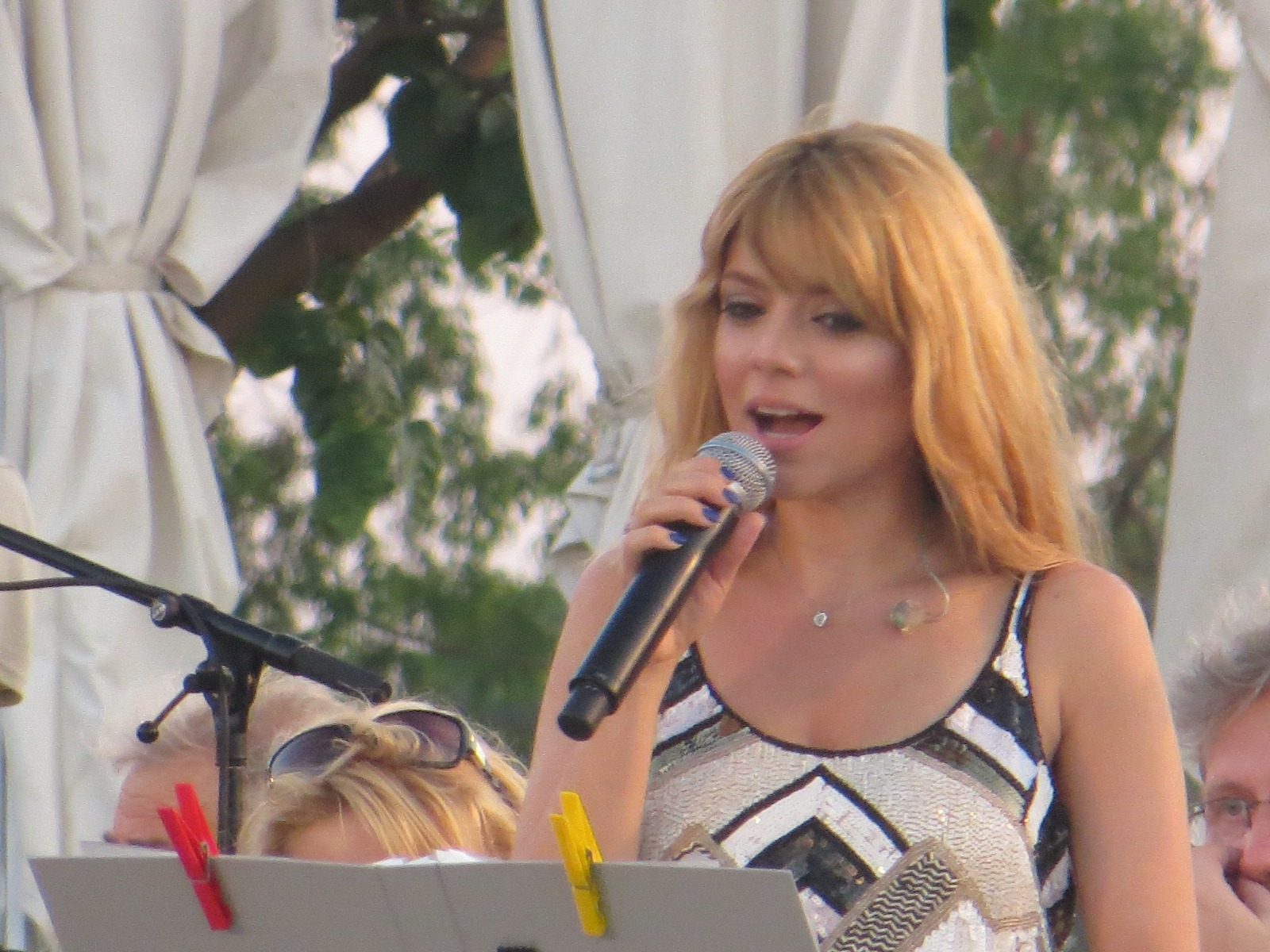
Maimon in 2013

In February 2013, Maimon released the fifth single from her solo album, "Kama at Yafa" ("How Beautiful You Are"), that didn't gain much success in the radio charts.

In June 2013, a sixth single from Maimon and Buskila's project was released, "Tamid Iti" ("Always With Me"), for the promotion of another tour of the duo. The song was an original song that was written for the project, and gained success in some radio charts. The song was not included in the live album.

In October 2013, Maimon joined the first season of the reality show "The X Factor Israel" as one of the four judges. As a mentor, in the first season Maimon got the "Over 25s" category and won together with her protégé, Rose Fostanes.

In December 2013, Maimon participated in the local children's musical theatre "Aladdin VeYasmin" ("Aladdin And Jasmine"), playing the role of Jasmine, alongside Harel Skaat and Eli Yatzpan.

In February 2014, Maimon collaborated with Israeli singer Muki, when she was featured in his song "Lir’ot Hafuch" ("Seeing Upside Down"), which appeared on his new album "Lev Chofshi" ("Free Heart").

In March 2014 Maimon started a new show tour, for which she received acclaims from critics. At the end of the year, her show was titled "The Best Israeli Show of the Year" by the culture and entertainment magazine "Akhbar Ha’ir".

In August 2014, Maimon released a new single, "Mi Shafuy Mi Meshuga" ("Who Is Sane Who Is Crazy"), that gained average success in the radio charts. The song's music video was released on 16 September. The song was composed by her musical partner, Shimon Buskila.

In January 2015 Maimon released a new single, "Zchuchiyot" ("Glass"), that gained high success in the radio charts, and became the tenth most played song in the Israeli radio in 2015.

In June 2015, Maimon continued to the second season of the reality show "The X Factor Israel" as one of the four judges. As a mentor, in the second season Maimon got the "Girls" category and came in third place together with her protégé, Anna Timofei.

In July 2015, Maimon released a new single, "Avir" ("Air"), that gained good success in the radio charts.

In September 2015, Maimon started playing in the local adaptation for the musical "Evita" in Israel's national theatre, Habima. Maimon played the main role of Eva Perón, alongside actors such as Aki Avni and Ran Danker. In the end of 2015 the show was titled "The Best Theatre Play of the Year" by the culture and entertainment magazine "Akhbar Ha’ir". In mid 2016 it was announced that Israeli singer and actress Maya Buskila will partially replace Maimon in the role of Evita and that they will play the character alternately, due to Maimon's tight schedule and her work on other projects. In October 2016 Maimon received the prize of "The Best Actress of the Year" named after Ella Dan by Habima Theatre. Maimon performed with the musical around 200 times, until it closed in March 2017.

In January 2016, Maimon posted in her Facebook account videos asking her fans to help her decide which song she will be covering in the next three shows of her winter show tour. She let her fan choose between "Chandelier" by Sia, "Hello" by Adele, and "I'm Not The Only One" by Sam Smith. Eventually "Chandelier" was chosen, and Maimon was performing the song in her shows. Maimon released the live version of the song which was recorded in Reading 3 few days later. Her live performance received raved reviews. In July, 2017, in a The Times of Israel blog post, Pakistan based blogger Sarmad Iqbal called Shiri's music a reason behind his love for Hebrew language.

In September 2018, Maimon joined the cast of Broadway's musical production Chicago for a two-week run. The show traveled to Israel for 16 engagements over a 9-day period.

In February 2024, she recorded a live album of greatest hits at Heichal HaTarbut accompanied by the Israel Philharmonic Orchestra, which was conducted by Tomer Adaddi. The album included a Hebrew rendition of "Don't Cry for Me, Argentina" ("אל נא תבכי ארגנטינה") in an homage to her past stint in Evita.

== Personal life ==
Maimon married Israeli event producer Yoni Rajuan in 2011. They have two sons. The family resides in Tel Mond, Israel.

Maimon has a Portuguese citizenship on account of her Sephardi Jewish ancestors.

== Discography ==
- Shiri Maimon (2005)
- Rega Lifney She... (Just Before...) (2008)
- Standing on My Own (2008)
- Ha'mofa Ha'meshutaf (The Joint Show) (2011)
- Sheleg Ba'sharav (Snow in the Heat Wave) (2012)
- Ha'albomim Ha'roshonim (האלבומים הראשונים) (2014)
- Transparent (שקופה) (2024)
- Live Album 2024 (אלבום הופעה חיה 2024) (2024)

== See also ==
- Music of Israel
- Women of Israel
- Women in the Israel Defense Forces
- List of Israelis
- List of Jewish actors
- List of Jewish musicians
- Israel in the Eurovision Song Contest

Awards and achievements
Preceded by David D'Or with Leha'amin	Israel in the Eurovision Song Contest; 2005	Succeeded by Eddie Butler with Together We Are One
