= Yigal Shilon =

Israeli television producer, screenwriter, director (1946-2024)

- יגאל שילון
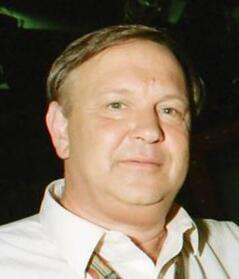
- Shilon in 1991
- Born: April 23, 1946; Tel Aviv, Mandatory Palestine
- Died: November 6, 2024 (aged 78); Tel Aviv, Israel
- Education: Technion (aerospace engineering)
- Occupations: Television producer, screenwriter, director, host
- Spouse: Zahava Shilon nee Inbar (m. 1972)
- Children: 4
- Relatives: Dan Shilon (Brother)

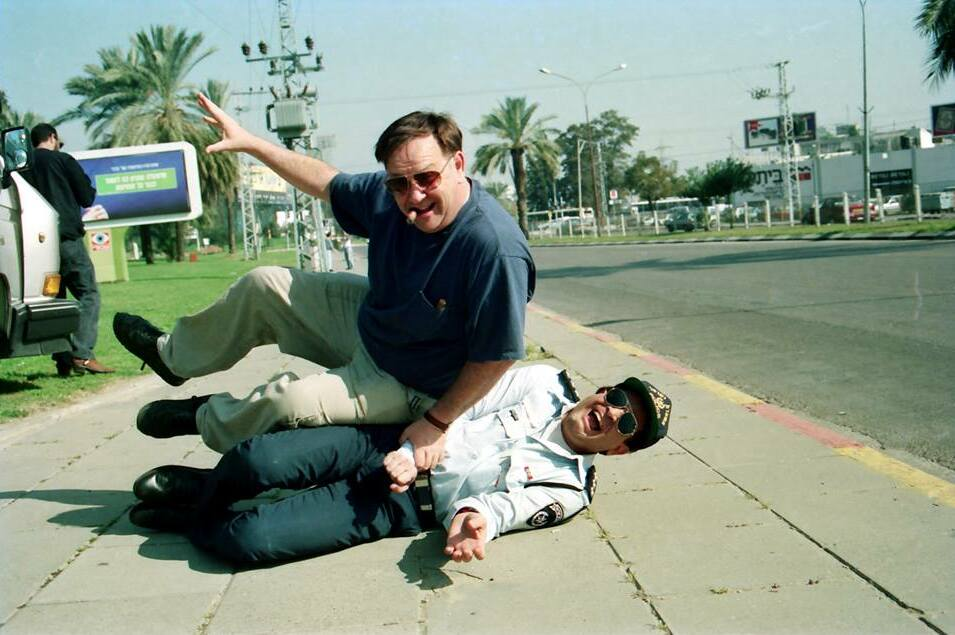
Together with his co-host Eli Yatspan, 1993

Yigal Shilon (Hebrew: יגאל שילון; April 23, 1946 – November 6, 2024) was an Israeli television producer, screenwriter, director, and host, best known for his role in creating popular Israeli prank shows.

== Biography ==
Yigal Shilon was born in Tel Aviv in 1946 to working-class Jewish immigrants from Eastern Europe. After attending the Ironi Daled high school in Tel Aviv he completed a bachelor's degree in aerospace engineering at the Technion Faculty of Aerospace Engineering in the Technion, as part of the Israel Defense Forces' Atuda program, but later on he ended up choosing to pursue a career in the entertainment industry instead.

His older brother was the well-known Israeli television host Dan Shilon, and his niece Adi Shilon went on to become a prominent radio and TV presenter.

=== Film career ===
In the 1980s Shilon directed several Israeli films, primarily in the prank genre. His first major film was "Hayeh Ahaltah Otah" ("Smile, You've Been Tricked") released in 1980, and which was a collaboration with the Israeli comedian Yehuda Barkan. Shilon followed this with two more prank films - "The Big Tease: Here Comes Another One" which was released in 1984, and "Nipagesh BaSivuv" ("See You at the Roundabout") which was released in 1986. Between 1986 and 1990 Shilon directed the commercials for the popular Israeli dairy pudding dessert Milky, featuring Chelli Goldenberg and a young Bar Refaeli. In 1988 he directed the film "Avodah B'Eynaim" starring the comedic duo Lazy Bums.

=== Television career ===
Shilon transitioned to television in 1989, initially joining Gabi Gazit's late-night show "Sof Sof" on the Israeli Channel 1, where he had a segment showcasing bloopers and outtakes from both Israeli and international TV productions. During this period he also hosted a segment in the TV program "Roeim 6/6" that was broadcast on the Israeli Educational Television and in which he showcased various humorous home videos clips.

In 1991 Shilon started co-hosting the popular Israeli prank TV show "Fisfusim Plus" alongside the Israeli comedian Eli Yatzpan which was broadcast on the Israeli Channel 1. In 1993 he hosted the popular prank show "Moadim B’Simcha" which was also broadcast on the Israeli Channel 1 and in which Israeli celebrities were pranked.

Starting in 1994 Shilon hosted and directed the television hidden-camera prank show "Fisfusim" which was broadcast on the Israeli Channel 2 for fourteen years.

In 2003 Shilon created and directed the show "Ha-Mofa Shel Steve" ("Steve's Show") which was inspired by the film "The Truman Show", in which an anonymous person who whom was supposedly cast as an actor in an Israeli telenovela, was in part of a long running hidden camera prank which lasted one month.

In 2012 Shilon directed the children's prank show "Sta’am!" which was broadcast on the Israeli Children's Channel.

In 2013 Shilon directed the prank show "Ambush" which was hosted by Ofer Shechter and broadcast on the Israeli Channel 10.

In 2015 Shilon created the game show "Look Who’s Asking" which was hosted by Muli Shulman and was also broadcast on the Israeli Channel 10.

=== Additional ventures ===
Shilon was also known in Israel for his "Shilonda" (שילונדע) double entendre puzzles that were published through the years both in the Israeli newspaper Yedioth Ahronoth and later on also in the Israeli entertainment magazine Pnai Plus. These puzzles had illustrations made by Shay Charka.

== Personal life and death ==
In 1972 Shilon married Zahava Inbar, who worked many years as a flight attendant for El Al and was later on a lecturer at the international women's organization Wizo. The couple had four children and resided in Tel Aviv. Two of their sons also pursued careers in the Israeli entertainment industry.

In January 2022 Shilon revealed a fall in his home had left him physically impaired and unable to walk. His experience adjusting to this new reality was documented in the film "The Mistake of My Life", which aired on Channel 12.

Shilon died at the Tel Aviv Sourasky Medical Center on November 6, 2024, at the age of 78. He was buried in the Yarkon Cemetery.

== See also ==
- Television in Israel
