= Standing on My Own =

Studio album by Shiri Maimon
- Released: (Israel) January 10, 2008 (United Kingdom) February 10, 2008
- Recorded: 2006–2007
- Genre: Soul, R&B, pop
- Label: (Israel) Helicon (United Kingdom) S-Curve
- Producer: TJ Cases, Steven Greenberg

Shiri Maimon chronology
Rega Lifney She... (2008)	Standing on My Own (2008)	Sheleg Ba'sharav (2012)

Standing on My Own is the debut international album by Israeli singer Shiri Maimon, released on January 10, 2008. Like Maimon's last albums, this album also combines elements of pop and soul. It contains an English version to her hit single Yoter Tov Lisloach, from her second album.

== Track listing ==
1. "Tender Love"
2. "Hard to Forget" (English version of "Yoter T'ov Lisloakh")
3. "Crossroads"
4. "Eyes for You"
5. "Angel" (later recorded in Hebrew as "Laila")
6. "Alone"
7. "Joy"
8. "Beautiful".
