= The X Factor Israel season 2 =

The X Factor Israel
- Season 2
- Hosted by: Bar Refaeli
- Judges: Rami Fortis; Moshe Peretz; Shiri Maimon; Ivri Lider
- Winner: Daniel Yafe
- Runner-up: Yossi Shitrit

Release
- Original network: Reshet
- Original release: June 13 – September 5, 2015

Season chronology
- ← Previous; Season 1 Next → Season 3

The X Factor Israel is the Israeli version of the British television music competition The X Factor. The second season started its run on Thursday, June 13, 2015. The show aired during prime time on Reshet network on Wednesdays and Saturdays. The season concluded on September 5, 2015.

== Judges and hosts ==
It was announced that Bar Refaeli, an Israeli fashion model, would host the second season. Contrary to most other versions of the X Factor where the judges panels was a mixture of singers and music industry figures, the Israeli version was composed entirely of musicians. The judges panel for the first season was composed of the rock singer Rami Fortis, the pop singer-songwriter and composer Moshe Peretz, the pop and R&B singer Shiri Maimon, and the pop singer Ivri Lider.

== Contestants ==
Key:

– Winner
– Runner-up
– Third Place

| Categories | Acts | | | |
|---|---|---|---|---|
| Groups (Peretz) | Ido and Atara | Close Up | After The Sun | – |
| Over 25s (Fortis) | Daniel Yafe | Libi | Shlomit Jersey | – |
| Girls (Maimon) | Anna Timofei | Tal Ginat | Hadar Lee | – |
| Boys (Lider) | Yossi Shitrit | Almog Krief | Dudu Ivgi | Ben Goldstein |

== Judges Houses ==
| Judge | Category | Assistant | Contestants eliminated |
|---|---|---|---|
| Lider | Boys | Nathan Goshen | Gavriel Potaznik, Dudu Ivgi |
| Maimon | Girls | Maya Dagan | Mazali Yamin, Lika Tischchenko |
| Fortis | Over 25s | Ania Bukstein | Noa Nina Blues, Benny Refael |
| Peretz | Groups | Lior Narkis | Aviv & Hadar, Eldar Brothers |

Season 2 judges and host

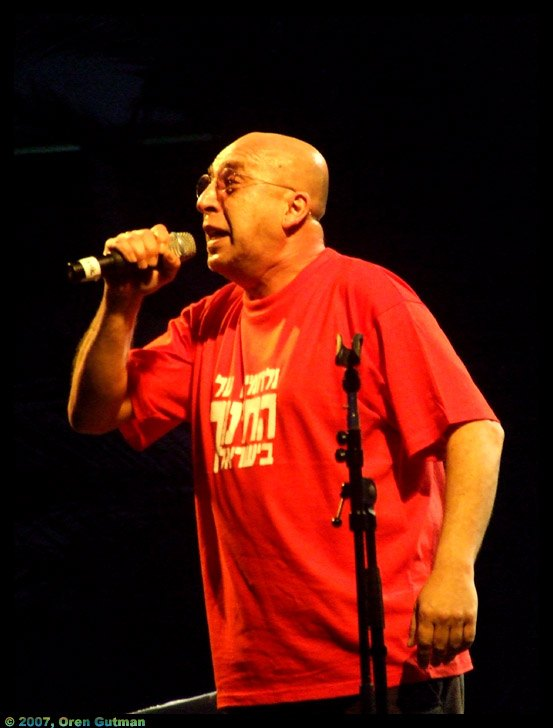
Rami Fortis

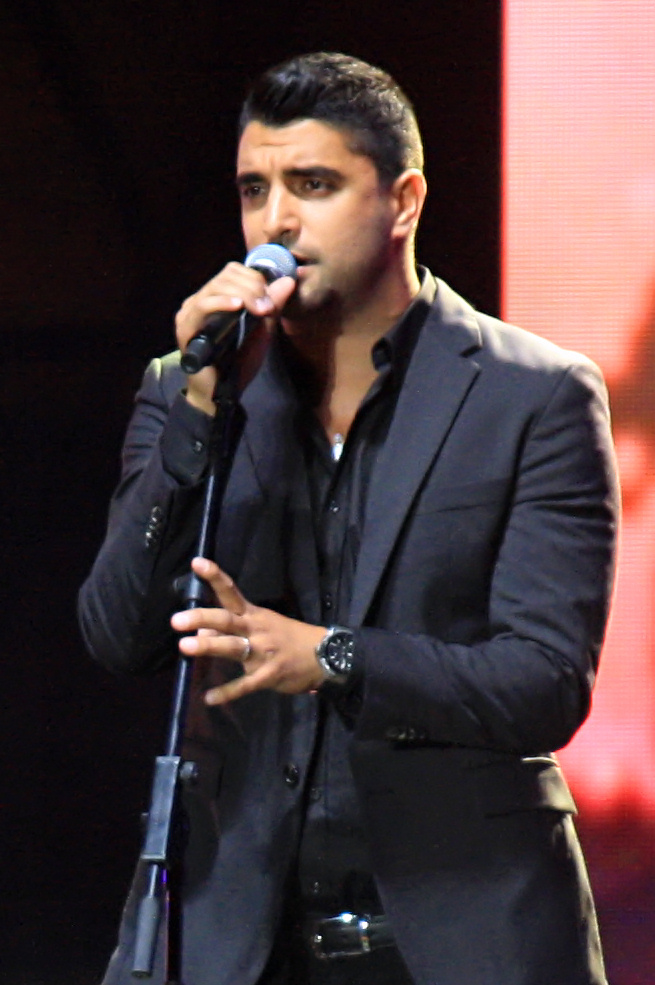
Moshe Peretz

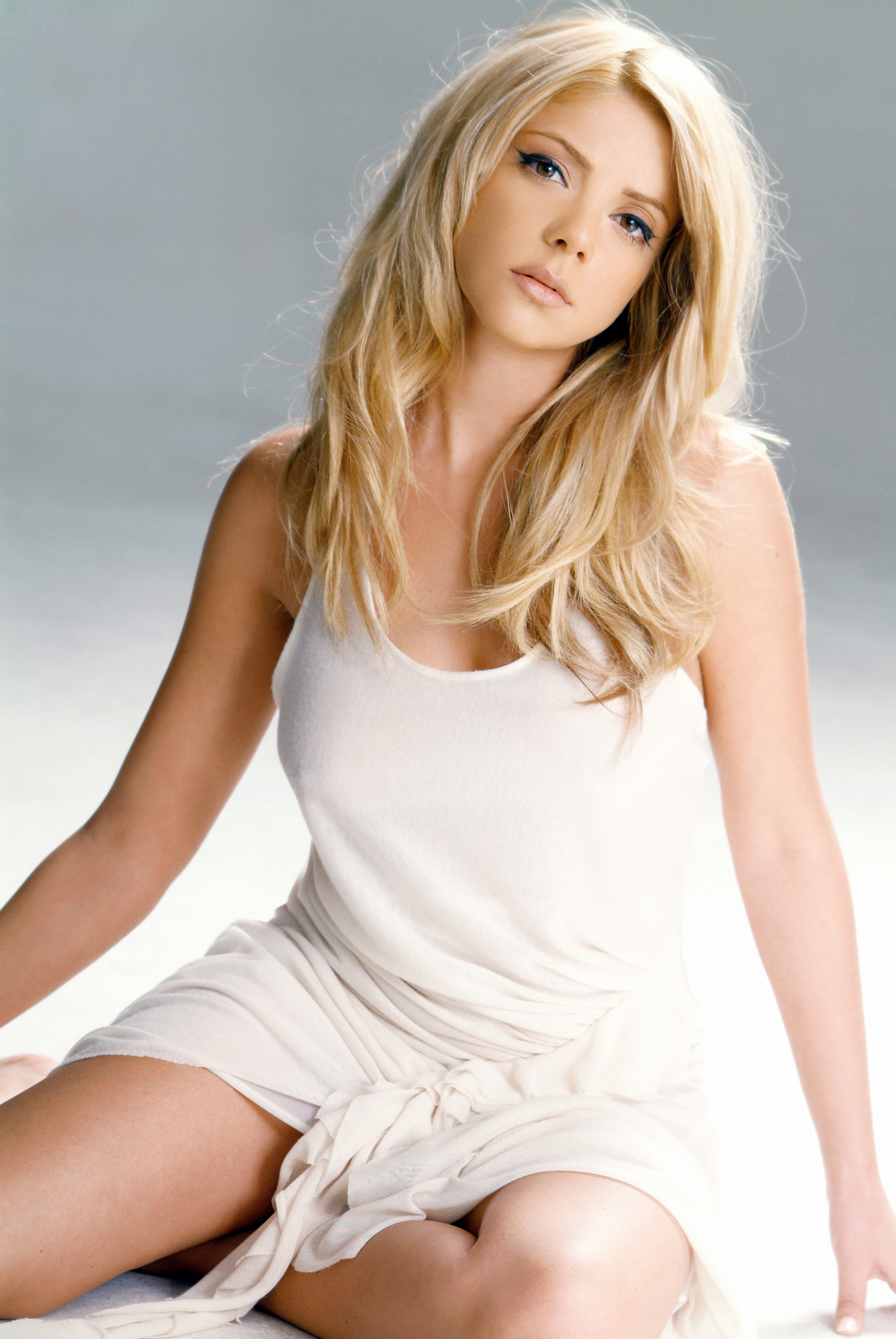
Shiri Maimon

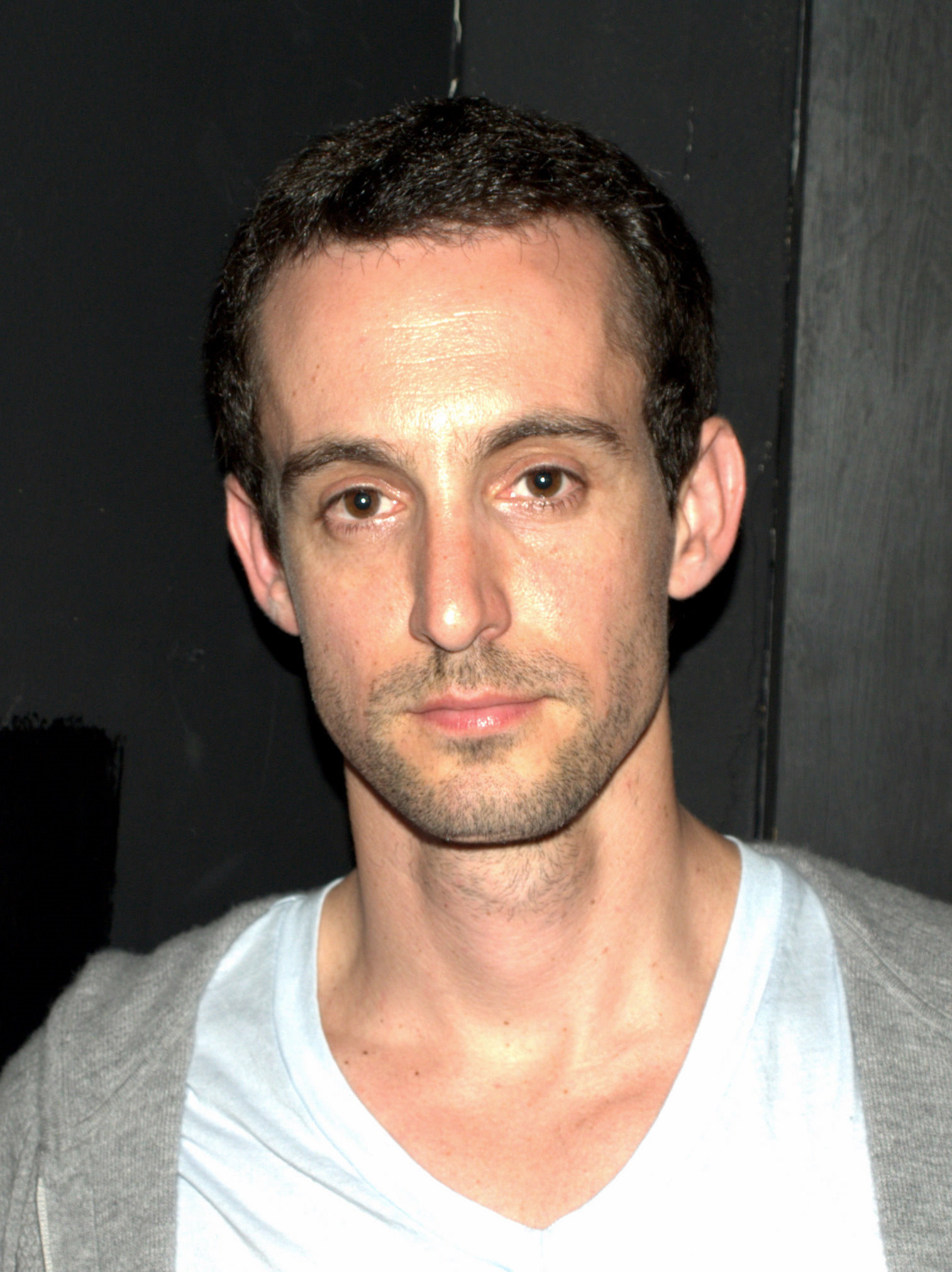
Ivri Lider

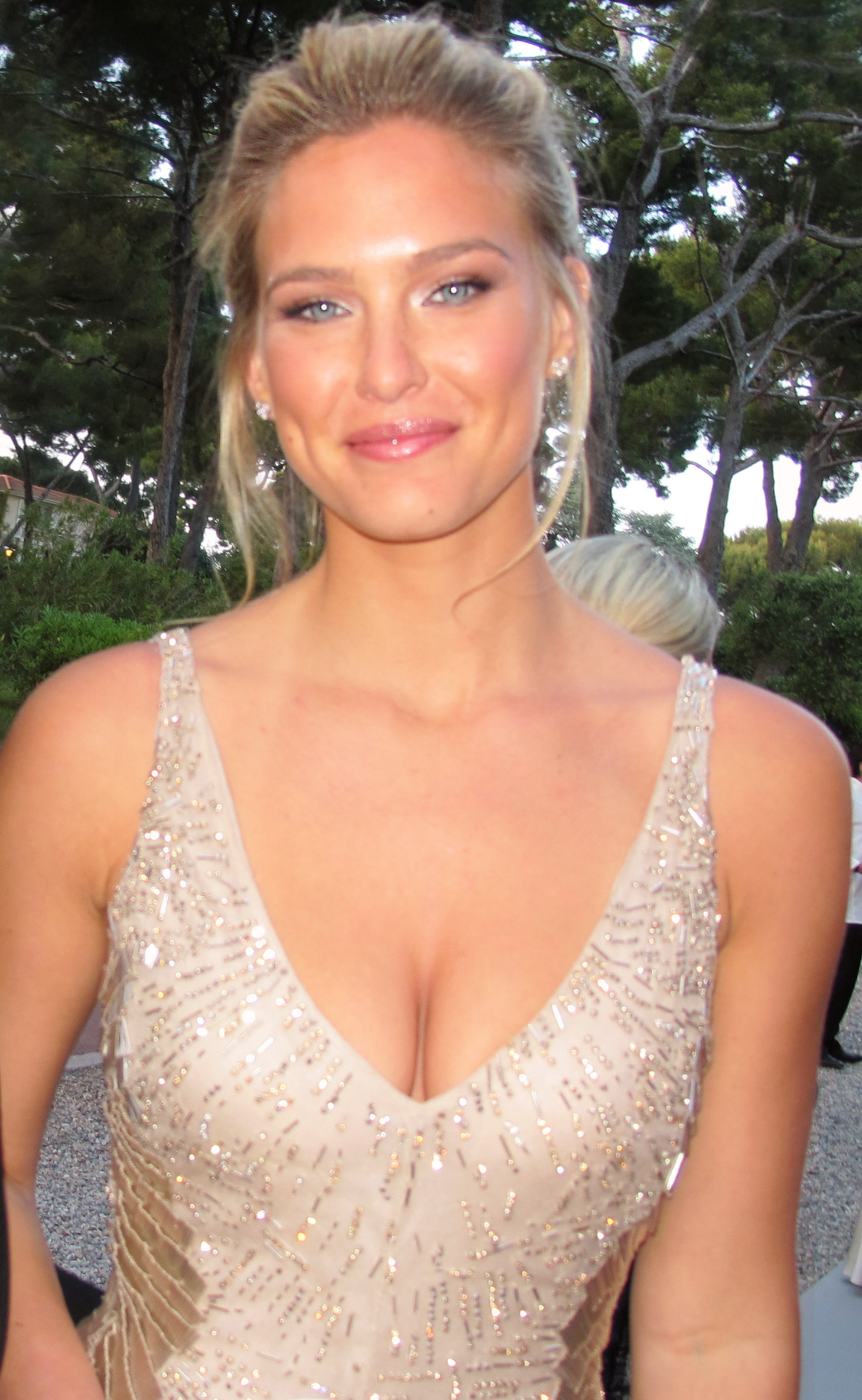
Bar Refaeli
