= Amir Fryszer Guttman =

Israeli musical artist

Amir Fryszer Guttman אמיר פרישר גוטמן
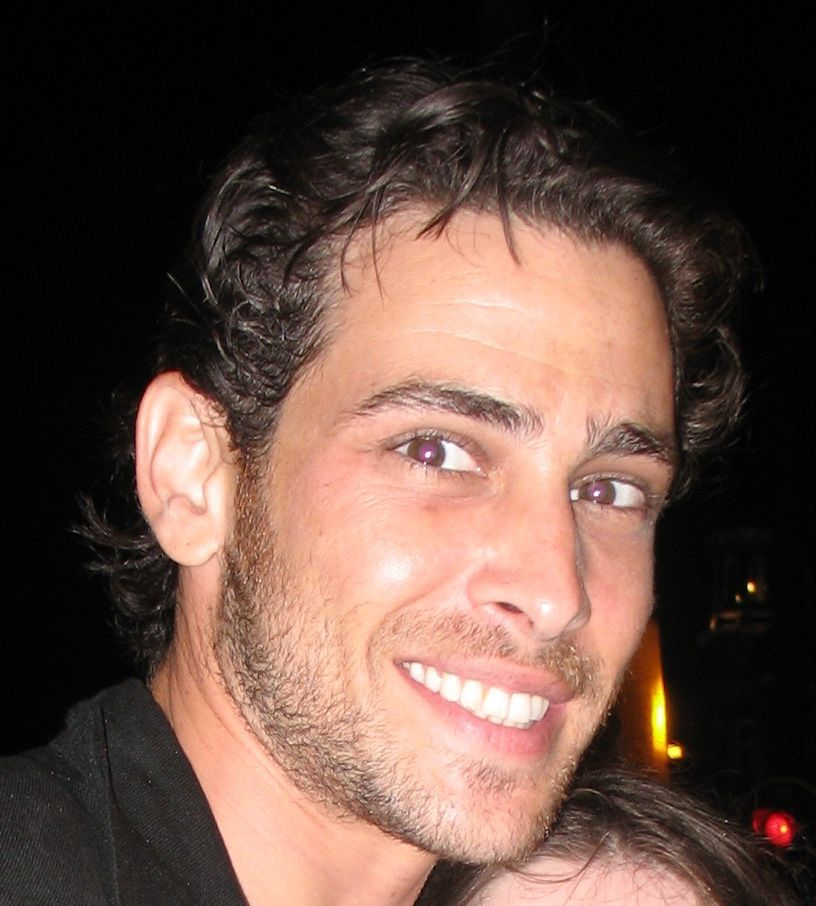

Background information
- Born: Amir Feiger; April 25, 1976; Kiryat Haim
- Origin: Israel
- Died: July 23, 2017 (aged 41) Rambam Health Care Campus
- Genres: Pop
- Occupations: Singer, actor
- Years active: 1995–2017
- Label: Hed Arzi Music

Amir Fryszer Guttman (Hebrew: אמיר פרישר גוטמן; April 25, 1976 – July 23, 2017) was an Israeli singer, musician, choreographer, actor, theater director and LGBT rights activist. He died after being swept away with his niece, whom he had held above water; his niece survived.

== Biography ==
Amir Fryszer Guttman was born as Amir Feiger in Kiryat Haim to a Romanian-born couple. He shortened his original family name to Fei when his parents divorced and added the surname of his maternal grandfather, Guttman, in honor of family members perished in the Holocaust. Fey Guttman began his career as a young journalist and model. After serving in the Israel Defense Forces, he joined the Eilat hotel's entertainment team. In 1996 he was selected by Hed Arzi Music to join a new boy band called "Hi-Five". Until it was dismantled in 2000, the band released three albums, all of which reached gold status, and an EP, and won the Festigal twice. He released two solo albums during his career: "Mantra" (2000), and "Honey In Beehives" (2007). He wrote and composed several songs for other artists, including Roni Dalumi, Tal Mosseri, Roni Duani, Eliana Tidhar and Tuval Shafir. He also worked as a choreographer and as a producer for Hamsa, David D'Or, Miri Mesika and as a director/assistant directors for plays such as the Israeli versions of High School Musical and The Jungle Book, amongst others, that featured many stars, including Tuvia Tzafir, Zachi Noy and many others.

== Personal life ==
Amir Guttman was one of Israel's first celebrities to come out of the closet. He married his long-time partner, Yanai Fryszer on the 9 September 2009 and took on his name. Gila Almagor organized the ceremony. It was Israel's first high-profile gay wedding, and it made Guttman an icon of the struggle for gay civil rights. On 25 February 2013 the couple's child was born, with the help of a surrogate mother in India.

In April 2016 Amir was diagnosed with T Cell Lymphoma in Tel Aviv Sourasky Medical Center. (Ichilov hospital) After a series of lengthy chemotherapy treatments, they found out on July 22 that he was misdiagnosed. He actually suffered from Kikuchi disease. This is an inflammatory disease that is much less severe compared with T Cell Lymphoma, but the symptoms are similar. Following the misdiagnosis and the unnecessary chemotherapy sessions, Amir submitted damages claim against the Tel Aviv Sourasky Medical Center.

Amir declared the day he got the good news as his new birthday. He also returned to his activism: when the Israeli government announced that it would prioritize straight couples seeking to adopt children, Amir Guttman argued that the decision was an insult to couples like himself and his husband, who were parents of a young boy.

== Death ==
On July 22, 2017, Amir Guttman celebrated with his family and friends the first anniversary of being cancer-free. They traveled to an undeclared beach (A beach where there is no lifeguard) in Atlit. Amir went swimming with his niece and noticed the waves getting unusually strong. Both were pulled into the sea by turbulence. Amir held on to the child and kept her head above water, himself battered by the waves. When they were pulled out of the water a short while later, the niece was unharmed but Amir was not breathing. He was taken to Rambam hospital in Haifa as the medics tried to resuscitate him. He was unconscious and without pulse. The next day, the hospital's director emerged with the news that Amir Guttman had died.

=== Theatre ===
Year	Title
2000 - 2001	Honk!
2001 - 2002	Hansel and Gretel
2002 - 2006	Mary Lou
2004	Peter Pan
2006 - 2008	The Band
