= Hi-Five (Israeli band) =

Israeli boy band (1996–2000)

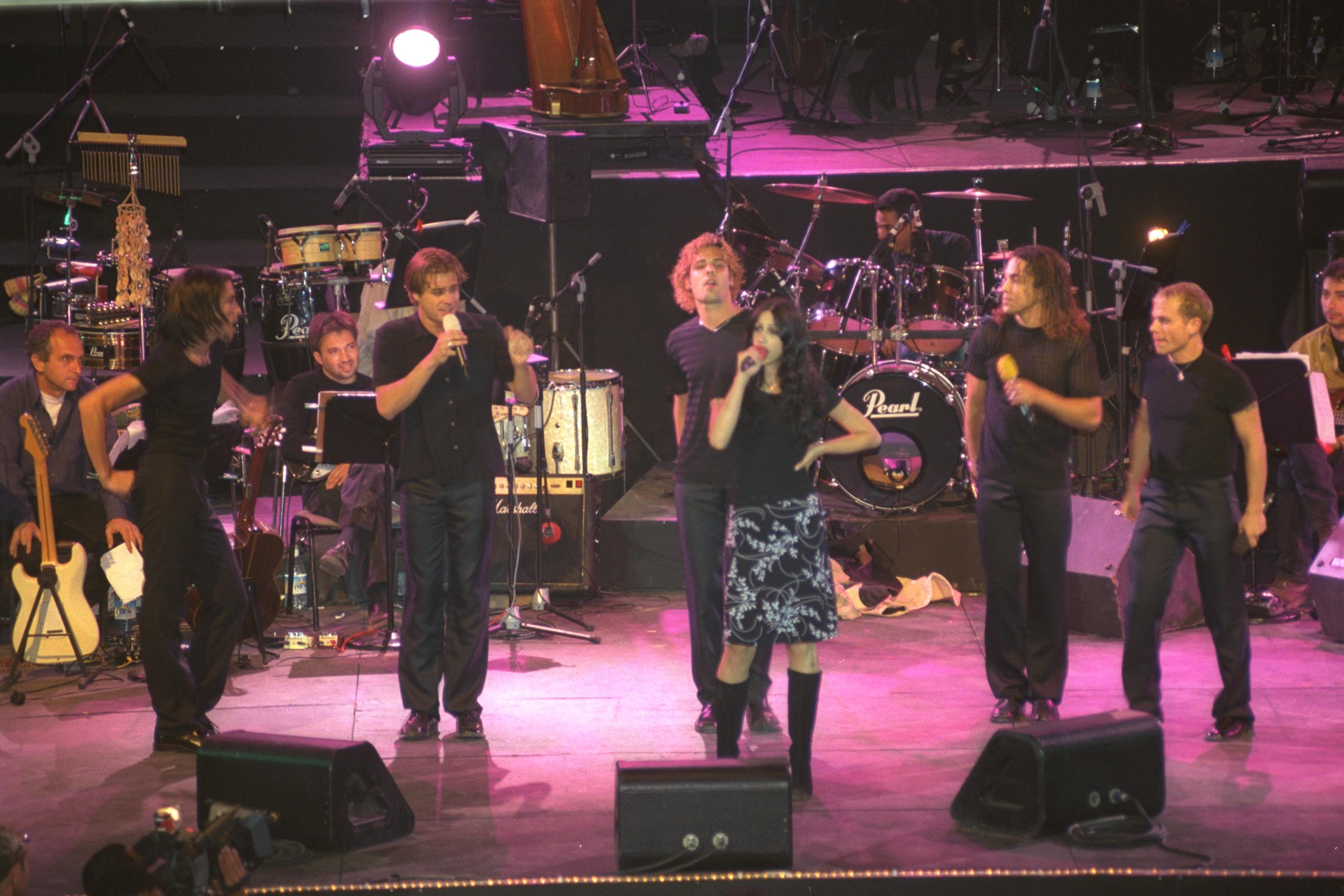

Background information
- Origin: Israel
- Years active: 1996–2000
- Label: Hed Arzi Music
- Past members: Amir Fryszer Guttman, Idan Yaskin, Eyal Shachar, Michael HarPaz, Eyal Dessau

Hi-Five was an Israeli boy band that operated from 1996 to 2000. Amir Fryszer Guttman was the lead. The other members of the band included: Eyal Shahar, Michael HarPaz, Idan Yeskin and Eyal Dessau. The band was marketed as "the first Israeli boy band," and gained great admiration and publicity from the youth of the late 90s.

Hi-Five released three studio albums and one mini-album. All four went gold in Israel with tens of thousands of copies sold. Hi-Five also participated in the Festigal three times and won twice: in 1997 and 1998.

In January 1999, Michael announced that he was leaving the band and returning to his hometown in the U.S.

In February 2000, the band officially announced their break up. Their last show took place on February 15, 2000, exactly 4 years after the band was established.

In February 2016, the band announced that it was reuniting for one single show in April. Following Gutman's hospitalization, the show was postponed to June. In May 2016, the band finally announced that the reunion show is cancelled.

Amir Fryszer Guttman drowned on July 22, 2017, while saving his niece.

== Discography ==
- Hi Five (1997)
- Party Time (EP) (1997)
- Everyone Dances Now (1998)
- Take 1 + 2 (1999)
- The Last (2000)

== Hits ==
- I (1997)
- Cloudy Day (1997)
- Allow Love (1997)
- We Have Nothing to Lose (1997)
- Far Far (1997)
- Glory (1997)
- Party Time (1997)
- Press (1998)
- Everyone Dances Now (1998)
- The Temple of Love (1998)
- Give Me A Hfive (1998)
- Children of the Nineties (1998)
- Screaming Love (1998)
- Little is the Most Fun in the World (1998)
- Free and happy (Cover, 1999)
- Continues to Walk (1999)
- Standing on a Cliff (1999)
- Confused Relationships (1999)
- Honey (1999)
- Who Said + Hi Fave Remix (1999)
- Dream Forever (Cover, 2000)
- Catch the World (2000)
