= Chain of Command (1994 film) =

- Directed by: David Worth
- Written by: Christopher Applegate
- Produced by: Asher Gat; Allan Greenblatt
- Starring: Michael Dudikoff; Todd Curtis; R. Lee Ermey; Steve Greenstein; Eli Danker; Eli Yatzpan; Joseph Shiloach; Shai Schwartz
- Cinematography: Avi Koren
- Edited by: Alain Jakubowicz
- Music by: Gregory King; David Trevis
- Release date: 17 February 1994
- Running time: 97 min.
- Country: United States
- Language: English

Chain of Command is a 1994 American action film directed by David Worth. The film stars Michael Dudikoff, and co-stars R. Lee Ermey, Eli Danker, Eli Yatzpan and Joseph Shiloach.

It is the last film Michael Dudikoff made for The Cannon Group.

== Plot ==
The film pairs a former Green Beret and a female Mossad agent. Anti-terrorist operative Merrill Ross (Michael Dudikoff) gets caught in the middle of a deadly international conflict in this explosive adventure. Danger lurks around every corner as Ross tries to thwart a plot to seize control of Qumir and its oil fields. Tailed by agents and a death squad, Ross dodges bullets and barely survives an oil depot blast as he tries to find out who's behind the mercenary scheme.

== Cast ==
- Michael Dudikoff
- Todd Curtis
- R. Lee Ermey
- Steve Greenstein
- Eli Danker
- Eli Yatzpan
- Joseph Shiloach
- Shai Schwartz

== Reception ==
In Reel Bad Arabs, media scholar Jack G. Shaheen placed Chain of Command on his list of the most offensive movies depicting Arabs. An overwhelming proportion of the Arab characters are terrorists, and the American heroes kill dozens of them without hesitation. As the protagonist, Al, does so, he says, "time for a little barbecue." Thus, according to Shaheen, viewers are left with the impression that all Arabs are violently evil and their lives are therefore dispensable.
