= Eli Danker =

Israeli actor (born 1948)

- אלי דנקר
- Born: October 12, 1948 (age 77); Israel
- Years active: 1979–present

Eli Danker (Hebrew: אלי דנקר; born 12 October 1948) is an Israeli actor who has appeared in many films and television series. He is also the father of the Israeli singer-actor Ran Danker.

== Career ==
Danker made his professional television debut on the Israeli comedy program Nikui Rosh ("Head Cleaning"), though he quickly established himself as a character actor in both television and film, playing Judas Iscariot in Jesus, and contributing to several Israeli films, including Gabi Ben Yakar and B'Yom Bahir Ro'im et Dameshek.

During the 1980s, Danker guest-starred on a number of American television series, including MacGyver and Mission: Impossible. Starting in 2000, Danker's television appearances increased with guest roles on Nash Bridges, The Agency, Alias, The West Wing, JAG, and The Closer.

== Partial filmography ==
- Jesus (1979) - Judas Iscariot
- video maker (1982)
- B'Yom Bahir Ro'im et Dameshek (1984)
- Little Drummer Girl (1984) - Litvak
- Wanted: Dead or Alive (1986) - Robert Aziz
- Bouba (1987) - Eli
- The Taking of Flight 847: The Uli Derickson Story (1988, TV Movie) - Castro
- War and Remembrance (1988, TV Series) - Udam
- MacGyver (1989, TV Series) - Yanif
- Mission: Impossible (1988, TV Series) - Robard
- Impulse (1990) - Dimarjian
- A Gnome Named Gnorm (1990) - Zadar
- Derech Ha'nesher (1990)
- The Mummy Lives (1993) - Museum Director
- Chain of Command (1994) - Col. Hakkim
- Tzedek muchlat (1997)
- Isha Beafor (1997-1999, TV Series)
- Suckers (1999) - Mohammed
- Besame Mucho (2000)
- Nash Bridges (2000, TV Series) - Abraham Lansk
- Ingil (2001)
- The Agency (2002, TV Series) - The Iraqi Intelligence Defector
- Alias (2003, TV Series) - Ahmad Kabir
- Special Forces USA (2003) - General Hasib Rafendek
- Air Marshal (2003) - Elijah
- The West Wing (2004, TV Series) - Israeli Defense Minister Doran Mazar
- JAG (2005, TV Series) - Judge Haji Shareef
- CSI: Miami (2005, TV Series) - Richard Thomason
- The Cutter (2005) - Professor Abrams
- Undisputed II: Last Man Standing (2006) - Crot
- The Closer (2006, TV Series) - Abdul al-Fulani
- Alufa, Ha- (2006-2007, TV Series) - Itzik Zelig
- My Mom's New Boyfriend (aka My Spy) (2008) - Jean Yves Tatao
- Viktor (2014) - Souliman
- 24 Legacy (2017, TV Series) - Ibraham Bin-Khalid
- Family (2017) - Dad
- First We Take Brooklyn (2018) - Dudu
