= Miri Shilon =

Israeli actress, television personality, journalist, producer and editor

- מירי שילון
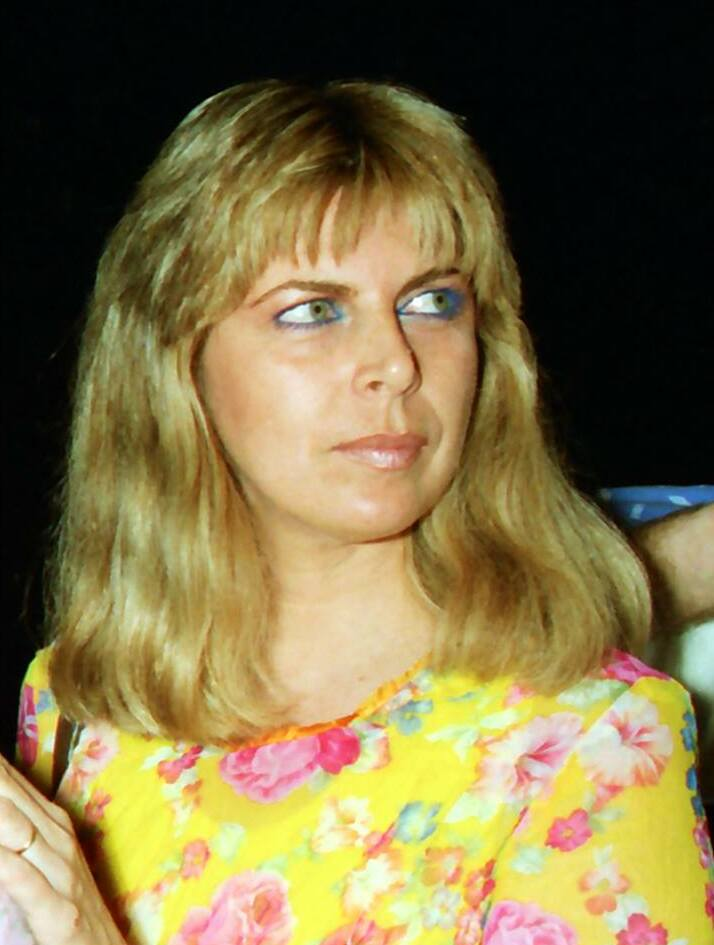
- Shilon, c. 1992
- Born: June 19, 1954 (age 71); Kfar Shmuel, Israel
- Other name: Miriam Tzivion
- Occupations: actress, television presenter, producer, editor, journalist
- Spouse: Dan Shilon (m. 2005; div. 2012)
- Children: 2
- Relatives: Yigal Shilon (brother-in-law)

Miri Shilon (Hebrew: מירי שילון; born June 19, 1954) is an Israeli actress, television personality, journalist, producer and editor.

== Biography ==
Miriam Tzivion (later Miri Shilon) was born and raised in Kfar Shmuel. She travelled to US and met a fellow Israeli television personality and journalist Dan Shilon in New York when Dan Shilon was married and worked as a reporter for the Israel Broadcasting Authority. She was a member of the Defense Ministry's delegation to the US government at that time.

In 2005, Dan Shilon divorced his first wife and married Miri. They have two children; Adi and Dafna. The couple divorced in 2012.

== Media career ==
The couple hosted a television programme together after their marriage. Shilon also acted in a TV series, titled City Tower in 2001. Her role as Miri Shilon was played by a fellow Israeli actress, Michal Yannai in an Israeli comical musical telenova HaShir Shelanu based on episodes from Shilon's life.

== See also ==
- Television in Israel
