= Yousef Sweid =

Arab Israeli actor and dancer (born 1976)

- يوسف سويد
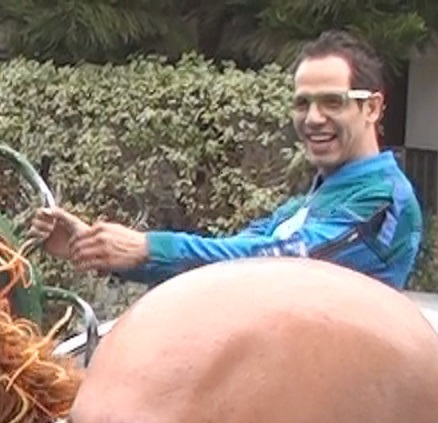
- Born: 22 June 1976 (age 49); Haifa, Israel
- Spouses: Yael Ronen (div. 2015) Adi Shilon (m. 2018)
- Children: 2

Yousef "Joe" Sweid (Arabic: يوسف سويد, Hebrew: יוסף "ג'ו" סוויד; born 22 June 1976) is an Arab-Israeli actor and dancer.

== Early and personal life ==
Yousef Sweid was born in Haifa, Israel, to a Christian-Arab family. He is a graduate of the theater department at Tel Aviv University.

Sweid was married to Jewish-Israeli Yael Ronen, a director at the Cameri Theatre. They had a son in 2009. In 2015 they divorced. In 2018, he married Jewish-Israeli television host Adi Shilon. Their daughter was born in October 2019. They reside mostly in Berlin, Germany. Following the events of October 7th, Shilon moved back to Israel and then Shilon and Sweid got divorced.

== Theater and film career ==
He started out by joining the Arab-Hebrew Theater in Jaffa. He went on to participate in television shows including Dancing again tonight (1991), Lane of White Chairs (a winner at the 1996 Acre Festival), Oh Brother Boom Boom (which in 2003 won at the Haifa festival for children's programming), Dragon (2004), and Immigrants (2005).

On stage, he performed alongside Ruth Kanner in 2001's Things you can see from here, you cannot see from there; in 2002 he appeared in Sea Shadow.

Sweid also participated in the international production The Time We Did Not Know Anything About Each Other, and in the dance production Barefoot. In 2001 he became director of a community theater program for both Arabs and Jews in Ramla, a town with mixed population in Israel.

In 2016, he played in one episode of the HBO series Game of Thrones in its 6th season, as a Meereenese freedman.

== Filmography ==
- 2002 : It's Not Me It's Not You (TV show) : Bartender
- 2004 : Maktub ("Destiny", TV movie) : Atef, a Druze policeman
- 2004 : Walk on Water : Rafik, an Arab Israeli waiter
- 2005 : Kvish ("The Road")
- 2005 : Telenovela Ltd.
- 2006 : Ha 'Alufa ("The Champion", TV series) : Jalal Kasum, a footballer
- 2006 : The Bubble : Ashraf, a Palestinian (starring role)
- 2008 : Restless : Arik
- 2009 : Agora : Peter, a fanatic Christian leader in 4th-century Alexandria
- 2011 : Homeland (American TV show, pilot episode) : Hasan Ibrahim (credited as Yusuf Swade)
- 2012 : Hatufim : Abdullah bin Rashid (Season 2 regular)
- 2013 : Omar : Torturer
- 2015 : Johnny and The Knights of Galilee (Israeli TV show) : Kais
- 2015 : False Flag : Amir Cohen (Amir Al-Hamati)
- 2016 : The Writer (Israeli TV show) : Kateb
- 2016: Game of Thrones : Meereenese freedman
- 2018: Tel Aviv on Fire : General Yehuda Edelman
- 2019: The Spy : George Seif
- 2020: Baghdad Central (TV Mini-Series 2020)
- 2020: Unorthodox (Netflix Series 2020)

Sweid also animates the puppet Mahboob ("beloved" in Arabic) in Sesame Street on Israel's Hop! channel.
