= Shiri Maimon (album) =

Shiri Maimon שירי מימון

Studio album by Shiri Maimon
- Released: (Israel) September 2, 2005
- Recorded: 2004–2005
- Genre: Pop, soul
- Length: 43:05
- Label: Helicon Records

Shiri Maimon chronology
Shiri Maimon שירי מימון (2005)	Rega Lifney She... (2008)

Singles from Shiri Maimon
- 1. "'Ad SheTavin Oti"; 2. "Hasheket Shenish'ar"; 3. "Ahava Qt'ana"; 4. "Kama Pe'amim"; 5. "Le'an SheLo Tilkhi"

Shiri Maimon is the debut album by Israeli singer Shiri Maimon, released on September 2, 2005, and certified gold just a few months after its release. It combines elements of pop and soul.
The first single from the album, and shiri's first commercial single ever, "Ad Shetavin Oti" ("Until You Understand Me"", Hebrew: עד שתבין אותי) was released in November 2004.

== Track listing ==
1. "Ahava Qt'ana" (A Small Love) — 3:45
2. "Le'an SheLo Tilkhi" (Wherever You'd Go) — 4:03
3. "Otkha" (To You) — 3:20
4. "Le Qolkha" (To Your Voice) — 4:38
5. "'Ad SheTavin Oti" (Until You Understand Me) — 3:06
6. "Tivrakh" (Run Away) — 2:58
7. "Kama Pe'amim" (How Many Times) — 3:38
8. "Kvar Lo Shelkha" (No Longer Yours) — 3:47
9. "Zman Shel Khesed" (Time of Grace) — 4:12
10. "MeRakhoq" (From a Distance) — 2:57
11. "Hasheket Shenish'ar" (The Silence That Remains) — 3:01
12. "Le'an SheLo Tilkhi" (Wherever You'd Go) (Henree's Drum Remix) — 5:50
