= Rose Fostanes =

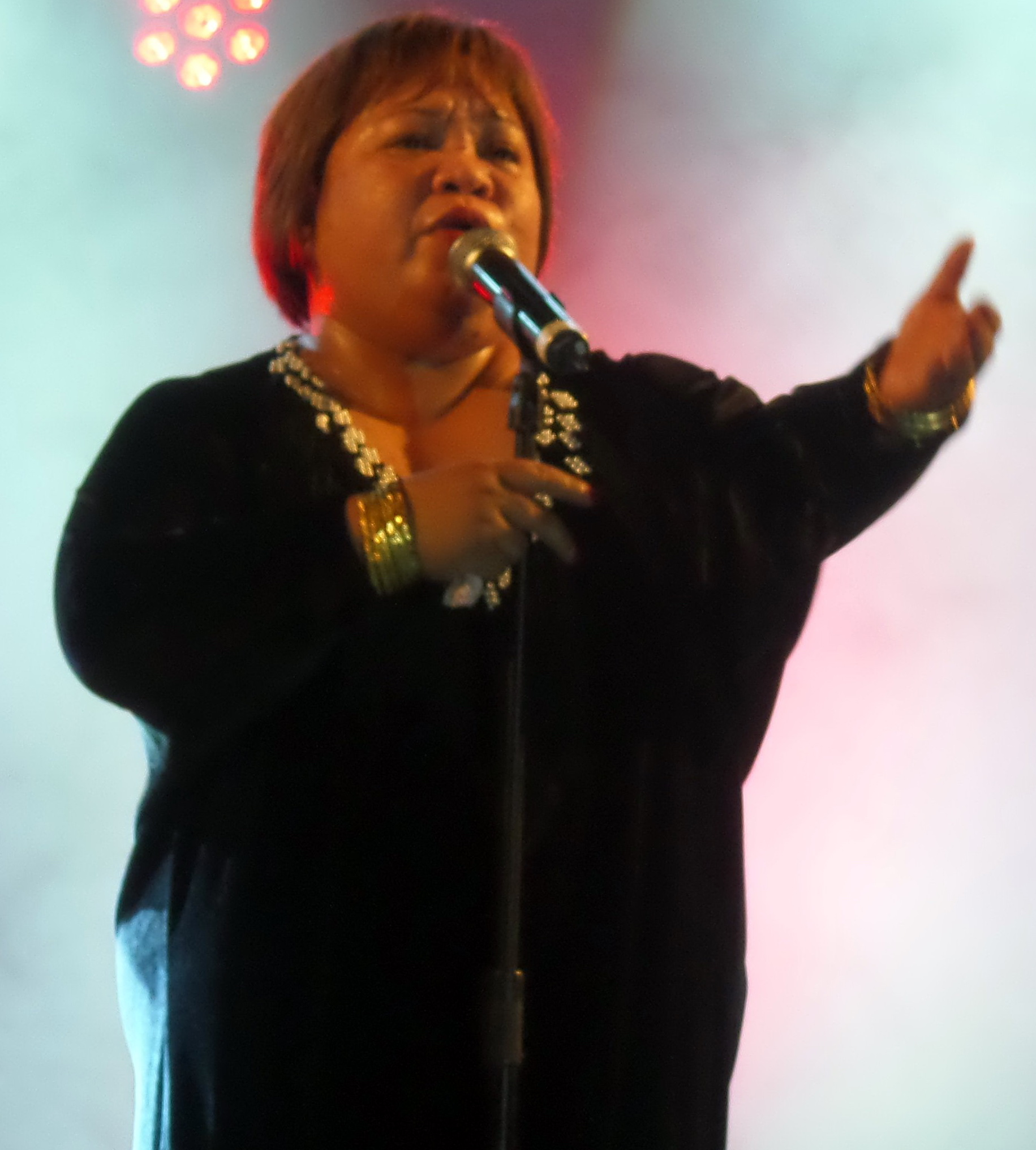
- Rose Fostanes performance in Acre, during Independence Day 2014

Background information
- Born: Rose Fostanes; January 2, 1967 (age 59); Taguig, Philippines
- Genres: Pop, R&B, soul
- Occupation: Singer
- Instrument: Vocals
- Years active: 2013–2017
- Labels: Aroma Music (Israel) (2013–2016); Star Records (Philippines) (2013–2016)

Rose "Osang" Fostanes (born January 2, 1967) is a Filipina singer living in Israel, who on January 14, 2014, won the first season of The X Factor Israel On April 10, 2014, she signed a record contract with Star Records to release her music material in the Philippines. Her debut album My Way was released on June 8, 2014.

== Biography ==
Rose Fostanes was born in Taguig, Philippines. At the age of 23, she left the country to work as a foreign caregiver. Fostanes arrived in Israel in 2008 to work for an ailing woman in her 50s. She is openly lesbian.

== Singing career ==
Fostanes was the lead vocalist of a band that performs in a small bar in Neve Sha'anan, Tel Aviv.

Fostanes auditioned for X Factor on October 26, 2013, singing the Shirley Bassey song, "This Is My Life". She received a "yes" vote from all four judges. Fostanes attracted international attention immediately after appearing as a contestant on the show.

Fostanes performed again during bootcamp, receiving a standing ovation from all the contestants. She made it to the top 20 and was assigned Shiri Maimon as a mentor.

On November 23, 2013, Fostanes performed at a charity event, "Concert for a Cause For Typhoon Yolanda" in Haifa, Israel, organized by the OFW in Israel Organization. The event raised money for Typhoon Yolanda victims in the Philippines.

Due to the conditions of her visa, Fostanes was not able to perform for pay in Israel. This was changed on January 20, 2014, when she was granted singing license in Israel. She chose an artist's visa, which allowed her to work as a singer in Israel but required her to stop working as a caregiver.

== Performances ==
| Show | Song | Original Artist | Result |
|---|---|---|---|
| Audition | "This Is My Life" | Shirley Bassey | Advanced to bootcamp |
| Bootcamp Top 80 | "You and I" | Lady Gaga | Continued in bootcamp |
| Bootcamp Top 40 | "Purple Rain" | Prince | Advanced to Judge's house |
| Judge's house | "The Best" | Bonnie Tyler | Continued in Judge's house |
| Judge's house | "Without You" | Badfinger | Advanced to live shows |
| Top 12 | "Beautiful" | Christina Aguilera | Safe |
| Top 11 | "Valerie" | The Zutons | Safe |
| Top 10 | "I (Who Have Nothing)" | Ben E. King | Safe |
| Top 9 | "Born This Way" | Lady Gaga | Safe |
| Quarter-final | "Bohemian Rhapsody" | Queen | Safe |
| Semi-final | "Because of You" | Kelly Clarkson | Safe |
| Final | "My Way" | Frank Sinatra | Winner |

== My Way and Philippine debut ==
Through her contract with Aroma Music, she performed during Israeli Independence Day shows in Acre and Tiberias. The company released her debut single "Walk Away". It was produced and composed by Ofer Meiri. She also had three shows in Australia. She was awarded "Global Entertainer of the Year" at the Gawad Amerika Awards in Los Angeles. She also appeared in a role in the film It's Just the Wind directed by director Amity Zmora.

On April 10, 2014, she signed a record contract with Star Records to release her music material in the Philippines. Her Philippine debut album, My Way, was released on June 8.

In December 2015, Elijah Sparks released the single "Baby Love" that featured vocals by Rose Fostanes.

== Discography ==
=== Albums ===
- 2014: My Way

=== Singles ===
- 2014: "Walk Away"

== See also ==
- The X Factor Israel
- Music in Israel

Awards and achievements
| Preceded by Debut Entry | The X Factor Israel winner 2013-2014 | Succeeded by Daniel Yafe |
