= Rega Lifney She... =

Rega Lifney She......רגע לפני ש

Studio album by Shiri Maimon
- Released: (Israel) 10 January 2008
- Recorded: 2006–2007
- Genres: Pop, R&B, soul
- Length: 44:39
- Label: Helicon Records

Shiri Maimon chronology
Shiri Maimon (2005)	Rega Lifney She......רגע לפני ש (2008)	Standing On My Own (2008)

Singles from Rega Lifney She...
- 1. "Yoter T'ov Lisloakh"; 2. "Kshehalakhta"; 3. "Tohavi Qtzat Et Atzmekh"; 4. "VeRatziti SheTed'y"

Rega Lifney She... (Hebrew: ...רגע לפני ש, meaning "Just before…") is the second studio album by Israeli singer Shiri Maimon, which was released in January 2008, by Helicon Records. It combines pop and R&B styles.

Shiri's first single out of her second album, was released in December 2007, entitled "Yoter T'ov Lisloakh".

== Track listing ==
1. "Ze Lo Ma SheHevt'ikhu Li" (That's Not What I Was Promised)
2. "Shvi LeRega" (Sit Down For a Moment)
3. "Yoter T'ov Lisloakh" (Better To Forgive)
4. "Bu'a" (Bubble)
5. "VeRatziti SheTed'y" (And I Wanted You To Know)
6. "Laila" (Night)
7. "Kshehalakhta" (When You Walked Away)
8. "Tohavi Qtzat Et Atzmekh" (Love Yourself a Little Bit)
9. "Mamshikha MiKan" (Moving On from Here)
10. "Bokheret Bi" (Choosing Myself)
11. "Rega Lifney She..." (Just Before...)
12. "Ze Lo Ma SheHevt'ikhu Li" [N.Y Version]
13. "Shvi LeRega" [N.Y Version]

== Singles ==
=== Yoter T'ov Lisloakh ===
"Yoter Tov Lisloach"

Single by Shiri Maimon

from the album Rega Lifney She...
- Released: (Israel) December 2007
- Genre: R&B, pop
- Length: 2:50
- Label: Helicon Records
- Songwriters: Avinoam Chai Simchy & Ido Ratson
- Producer: Yoad Nevo

Shiri Maimon singles chronology
"Le'an SheLo Tilkhi" (2006)	"Yoter Tov Lisloach" (2007)	"Kshehalakhta" (2008)

"Yoter T'ov Lisloakh" (Hebrew: יותר טוב לסלוח, meaning: "Better To Forgive") is the first single by Shiri Maimon and was released on December 10, 2007.

The song was described by The Jerusalem Post as "an instant hit". It hit #1 in the weekly music charts of Israeli radio stations Galgalatz, Radio Darom, Radio Lev HaMedinah, Radio Haifa, Radio Tzafon Lelo Hafsaka and Radio Yerushalaim. It was #2 in Reshet Gimmel and Radio Emtsa HaDerekh.

The song was #39 in the yearly chart of the Israeli Radio station Reshet Gimmel. This is the only radio station that this song was in its yearly chart.
