= Ori Shakiv (singer) =

Israeli singer-songwriter (born 1998)

Ori Shakiv אורי שכיב
- Born: 5 January 1998 (age 28); Bat Yam
- Genres: Pop
- Occupations: singer; songwriter; record producer
- Years active: 2015–present

Ori Shakiv (born January 5, 1998) is an Israeli singer, songwriter, and music producer. Shakiv rose to fame in 2013 as a contestant on The X Factor Israel, where he finished in third place. Since then, he has become a prominent figure in the Israeli music scene, both as a singer-songwriter and as a composer for other artists. In 2022, he returned to television on the show The Next Star for Eurovision, where he shone with his original song "Ole," receiving praise from both the jury and the public. Shakiv collaborates with renowned artists and is involved in the creation of hit songs in the Israeli music scene.

== Early life and career ==
Shakiv was born on January 5, 1998, and grew up in the city of Bat Yam. He is a graduate of the Hashmonaim Municipal Comprehensive School in the city. From a young age, he showed an interest in the world of music, was drawn to writing and composing, and began to engage in musical creation as a teenager. The combination of natural talent, a unique voice, and an original artistic approach paved his way into the world of music. Shekiv rose to fame in 2013 after participating in the first season of the music talent show X Factor Israel. In that season, she reached the final and finished in third place at just 15 years old. Alongside other notable contestants like Eden Ben Zaken, Shakiv impressed viewers and judges with her sensitivity and unique musical style. Her participation in the show brought her significant visibility and public recognition. In 2022, Shakiv returned to the stage when he participated in the ninth season of the program "The Next Star for Eurovision", which aired on Keshet 12. In his opening audition, he performed his original song "Oleh", which he wrote and composed. The performance impressed the judges, who awarded him six blues, and led to the curtain being raised with 93% positive votes from the audience.

The song, which deals with the relationship between the speaker and his father and the Creator of the world, became an instant hit and was later released as a single. In 2015, about five months after the success of his debut single "Tevini," he released his second track, "When the Night Ends," which he wrote and composed. He created the arrangements with music producer Nadav Biton. The song is characterized by an authentic Israeli sound that blends the folk of the era with Mediterranean influences, and is considered one of the standout songs of the period, immediately capturing the attention of radio stations and the public. That same year, he released the single "Lama," also written by him. The official music video featured model Efi Flaria, and the arrangements and musical production were handled by Nadav Biton.

In 2023, he released the original single "Ebed ve Melech," a work inspired by his personal struggles and life experiences. He created the melody with musician Matan Levy, and Lidor Sultan handled the arrangements and musical production.

In 2024, he wrote and composed the song "Banya," in memory of his relative, Major General Banya Rubel, who was killed in action during Operation Protective Edge. The song is written from the perspective of Banya's brother, Yarin, and expresses personal grief and family mourning. This is the fifth song he created in memory of a soldier killed in the operation. That same year, he composed the song "Ikhola Lebed" by Odeya, which appeared on his album Yelda Shel Emunah.
