= Dan Shilon =

Israeli journalist (born 1940)

- דן שילון
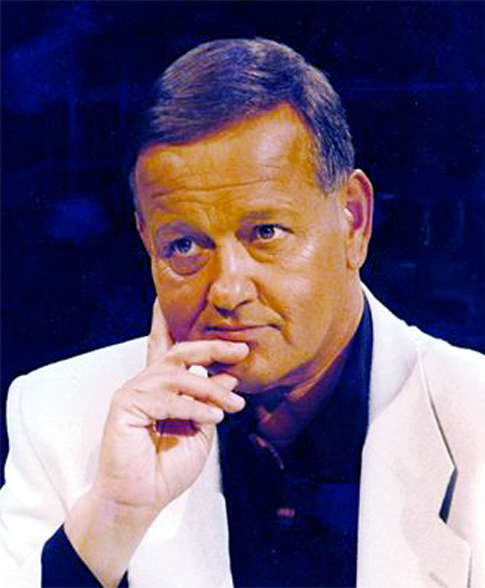
- Shilon c. 1992
- Born: 24 October 1940 (age 85); Tel Aviv, Mandate Palestine
- Occupations: Television host; director; producer
- Spouse: Miri Shilon (m. 2005; div. 2012)
- Children: Adi Shilon, Dafna Shilon
- Presenting career
- Show: Dan Shilon Live
- Station: Channel 2
- Time slot: Late night
- Style: Talk show
- Country: Israel

Dan Shilon (Hebrew: דן שילון; born 24 October 1940) is an Israeli television host, director, and producer.

== Career ==
Dan Shilon began his career in the 1960s with Israel Radio, was a correspondent of Kol Israel (Voice of Israel), and was a journalist for Yediot Ahronoth. He also was the General Manager of the Israeli television company Reshet (רשת), a franchisee of Channel 2 on Israeli television, until he resigned in 1988.

In 1988, after political opponents Yitzhak Shamir and Shimon Peres debated each other, leftist Mapam politician Meir Pa'il, opined: "Neither is qualified to lead Israel. [Shamir] is complete square and [Peres] is a shifty mediocrity. [Dan Shilon] is more intelligent than both of them, and Shilon is no Rambam."

Shilon hosted an Israeli late-night television talk show about political and social issues on Channel 2 on Israeli TV, which was very popular in the early 1990s, known as The Dan Shilon Show or Dan Shilon Live. It was the Israeli equivalent of The Phil Donahue Show. The show features both liberal and conservative Israeli public figures as guests, and dealt with controversial topics.

In 1998, Prime Minister Benjamin Netanyahu's spokesman accused him of "crossing the lines" of appropriate journalistic behavior, and taking a stand against Netanyahu.

== See also ==
- Television in Israel
- Media of Israel
