= Eli Yatzpan =

Israeli television host and comedian

Eliyahu Yatzpan
- אלי יצפאן
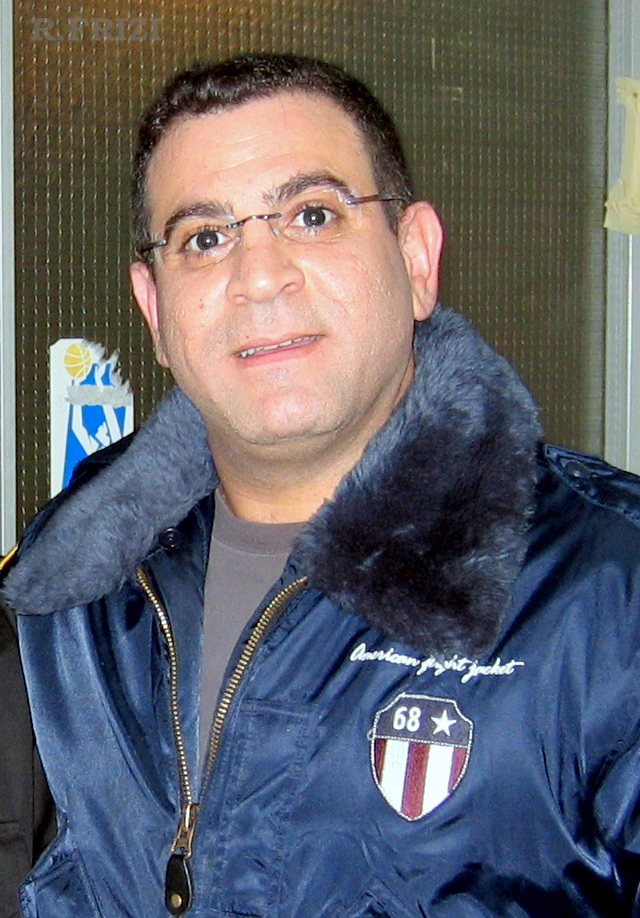
- Born: June 6, 1965 (age 61); Tel-Aviv, Israel
- Occupations: Late night talk show host (Yatzpan), comedian

Eliyahu Yatzpan (Hebrew: אלי יצפאן; born June 6, 1965) is an Israeli television host and comedian, best known as the host of the Channel 3 late-night talk show/variety show Yatzpan between 2001 and 2006.

== Biography ==
=== Early life ===
Yatzpan was born on June 6, 1965, in Tel Aviv, Israel. He is the fifth of eight children in an Iraqi-Jewish family. His father, Huji, was a tailor and his mother, Ungel, was a nanny.

While he attended the vocational school, Kadoorie Agricultural High School in the Lower Galilee in the early 1980s, he became known for his impressions and high jinks especially for coming into school dressed as Antiochus on random occasions. His schoolmates nicknamed him, "juha". After graduating, he was drafted into the Israel Defense Forces first into a course for quartermasters because they didn't believe him when he said that he could sing. Luckily for him he was moved to the "mafhash" (Hebrew: מפח״ש) entertainment troop (along with later to be Israeli celebrities such as Hanan Goldblatt and Orna Datz, then known as Orna Cohen).

=== Television career ===
His first television appearance was in the Israeli children's science fiction mini-series Hatsatskanim (1989) which was broadcast on the Israeli educational channel. he played the role of the alien Shemesh, the technician of the rocketship.

In 1990 he appeared in the entertainment show Motzash (Saturday night) in Channel 1 helped earn Yatzpan a little bit of name recognition but when in 1992 he joined Yigal Shilon's hidden camera show, Fisfusim (Hebrew: פיספוסים) on Reshet Channel 2 (Israel) he exploded on screen playing many different characters, tricked many people in Israel and abroad and gained celebrity status in Israel.

Between the years 1996 and 1997 Yatzpan hosted his own entertainment night show on Friday nights on Channel 2 in which he interviewed celebrity guests. Between the years 1998 and 1999 Yatzpan's night show moved to Saturday nights and was remade to include more skits (which most of them he performed without any help from other actors). Between the years 2001 until 2006 he hosted his own night show on Channel 3 for which he received many awards.

In 2007 he started hosting his own night show on Channel 2 called Shalom and Good Evening.

=== Movie career ===
In 1988, Yatzpan landed a role in the movie Fictional Marriage (Hebrew: נישואים פיקטיביים), where he played Bashir, an Arab waiter. After that Yatzpan played in several films such as Ehad MiShelanu (One of Us) (1989), Max VeMorris (Max and Morris) (1994) and Chain of Command (1994)

=== Theater career ===
After discharge, he joined a Jewish performance tour of the United States. When he arrived back, he joined an acting group and auditioned for various acting roles at Tel-Aviv's famous Habima theatre.

In 1990, he appeared with Sefi Rivlin in the theatre show My wife, a choice of fine (אשתי, ברירת קנס). By the mid-1990s he raised an entertainment with Meir Suisa called "Suisa VeYatspan first" (סוויסה ויצפאן תחילה). In 1999 they performed in a new show called Suisa VeYatspan, second pulsation (סוויסה ויצפאן, פעימה שנייה). A year later he appeared in the children's musical The Siam king (based on the book Anna and the King of Siam), and in 2004 he played in the children's musical Aladdin. In 2007, Yatzpan played in the children's musical based on Jules Verne's book Around the World in Eighty Days.

== Personal life ==
Yatzpan is married to Galit and thay have three children, Ido, Noa and Neta. Yatzpan lives in Ramat HaSharon.
