= Adi Shilon =

Israeli television presenter

- עדי שילון
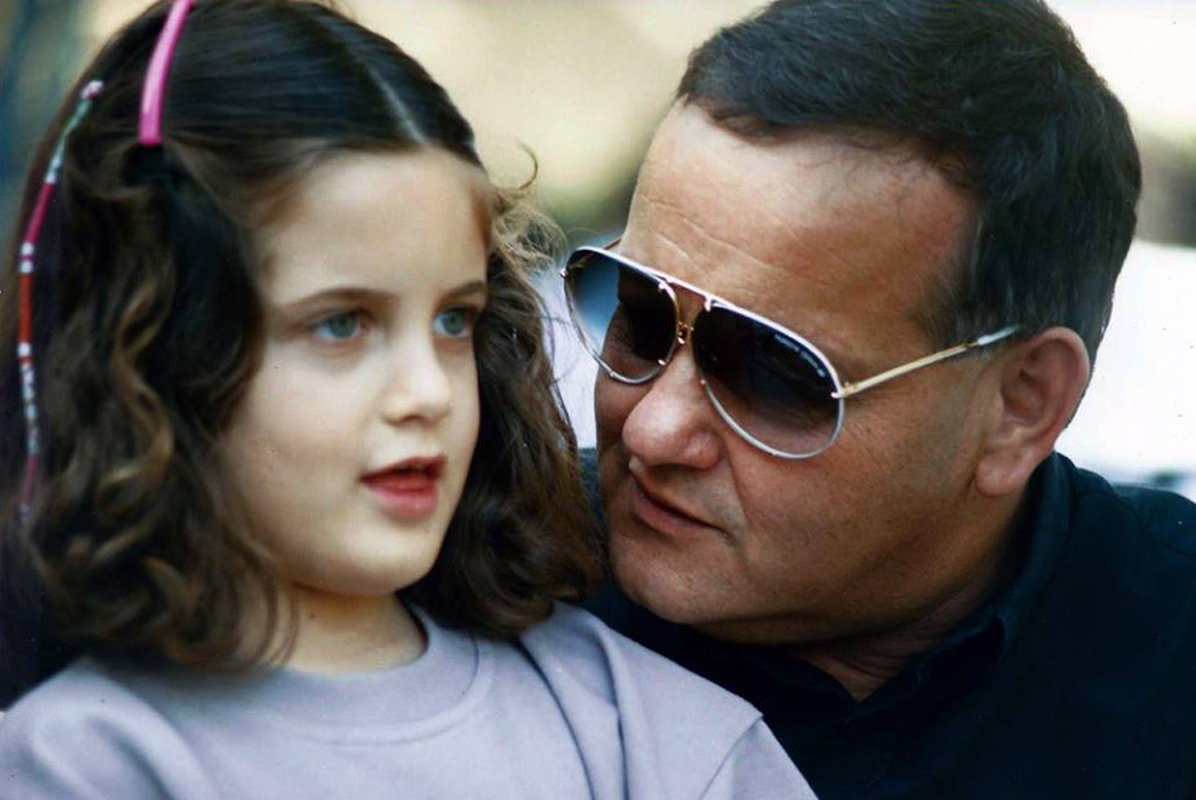
- Shilon as a child with her father Dan Shilon, 1992
- Born: 10 December 1987 (age 38); Tel Aviv, Israel
- Occupations: Actress, television presenter, journalist, radio personality
- Spouse: Yousef Sweid (2018–)
- Relatives: Yigal Shilon (uncle)

Adi Shilon (Hebrew: עדי שילון; born 10 December 1987) is an Israeli radio presenter, actress and television host. She is the daughter of Dan Shilon.

== Biography ==
Adi Shilon was born in Tel Aviv to an Ashkenazi Jewish family. Her parents, Dan Shilon (formerly Shulkis) and Miri Shilon (née Tzivion), were popular Israeli television personalities. Adi's uncle Yigal Shilon is an Israeli television and film director.

In 2018, she married Arab-Israeli actor Yousef "Joe" Sweid. Their daughter was born in October 2019. They reside mostly in Berlin, Germany.

== Media career ==
She began her media career on Hai from Tel Aviv, a daily program show in 2010. She has also produced radio programs such as The Little Man from the Radio, The Morning show and Lev Tel Aviv.

== See also ==
- Television in Israel
- Radio in Israel
