= Sheleg Ba'sharav =

Sheleg Ba'sharav שלג בשרב

Studio album by Shiri Maimon
- Released: (Israel) August 30, 2012
- Recorded: 2009–2012
- Genres: Pop, soul, R&B
- Label: Helicon Records

Singles from Shiri Maimon
- 1. "Sheleg Ba'sharav"; 2. "Mekhaka SheTashuv"; 3. "BeSof Yom"

Sheleg Ba'sharav (Hebrew: שלג בשרב, meaning "Snow in the Heat Wave") is the third studio album by Israeli singer Shiri Maimon, released on August 30, 2012.

== Track listing ==
1. "Sheleg BaSharav" (Snow in the Heatwave) - 3:31
2. "Mekhaka SheTashuv" (Waiting for You to Come Back) — 3:14
3. "Kama At Yafa" (How Beautiful You Are) — 4:04
4. "Ga'agua" (Longing) — 3:26
5. "'Ulay Ani Bekha" (Maybe I'm in You) — 3:19
6. "Dilemma" - 3:24
7. "Lizroq Zahav" (Throwing Gold Away) — 3:15
8. "LaYsha SheHayta" (To the Woman That Was) — 4:06
9. "Esha'er Otkha Lesaper" (I Will Remain, to Tell About You) — 3:12
10. "BeSoff Yom" (At The End of a Day) — 3:08
