= Moshe Peretz =

Israeli musician

Moshe Peretz משה פרץ
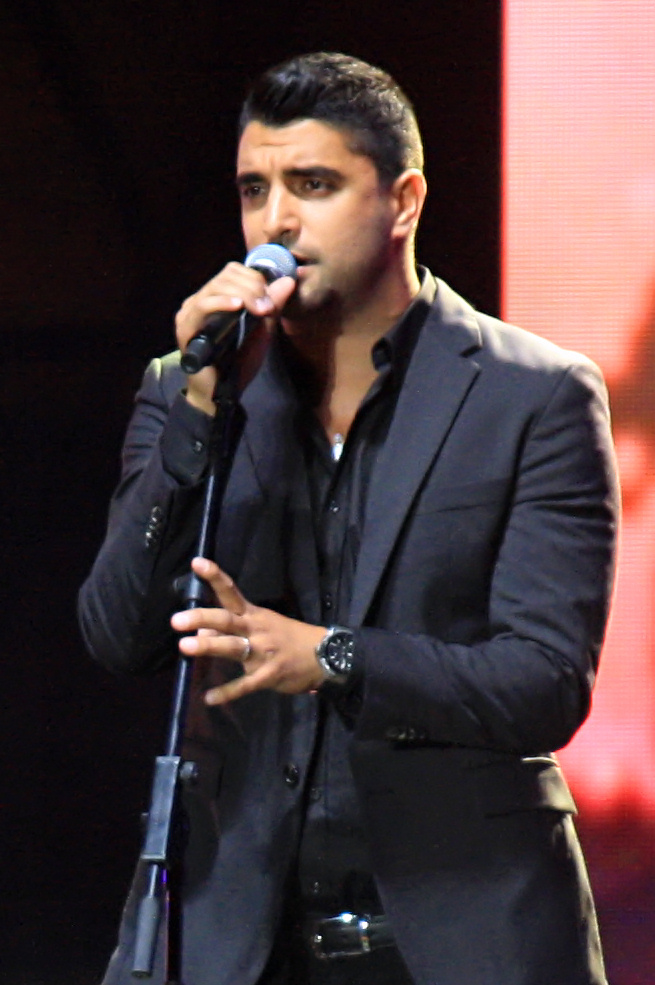
- Peretz in 2014

Background information
- Born: Moshe Peretz; 10 May 1983 (age 43)
- Origin: Tiberias, Israel
- Genres: Mizrahi music, pop
- Occupation: singer-songwriter
- Instrument: Vocals
- Years active: 2002–present
- Website: www.moshe-peretz.co.il

Moshe Haim Peretz (Hebrew: משה פרץ; born 10 May 1983) is an Israeli Mizrahi music pop singer-songwriter and composer. Beginning in 2013, Peretz acted as judge for The X Factor Israel.

== Early life ==
Peretz was born and raised in Tiberias, Israel, to a Sephardic Jewish family. His father Miguel was of Moroccan-Jewish origin and his mother was of Iraqi-Jewish origin. Peretz started singing as a poet in a synagogue in Tiberias at the age of 13 and began to compose songs.

At the age of 18 Peretz was enlisted as a soldier to the Israel Defense Forces. During his military service, he performed "שיר המעלות", during Yom Hazikaron (Israel's Memorial Day) ceremonies held at his base that received positive feedback leading to him serving in a military music band. In 2002, he started writing songs while still serving in the army.

== Career ==
After his honorable discharge from the IDF, he released his first album in 2005 entitled Mabit El Hamromim (מביט אל המרומים) that saw sale of over 10,000 copies in Israel. His follow-up album Esh (אש) in 2007 was even more successful selling 20,000 copies and certified gold. The title track "Esh" was heavily promoted on Israeli radio and specialized music channels. In 2008, he had a hit that topped the Israeli singles chart called "Elaich" meaning "You" that was the precursor of the third album Elaich (אלייך) that sold over 40,000 copies and was certified platinum. His fourth studio album proved however his most successful album in 2010. Entitled Me'ha'shamaim (מהשמיים), it sold over 110,000 copies and was certified double platinum. The song "שתיים בלילה" meaning "2 o'clock" topped the Israeli singles chart. He conducted a grand tour to promote the album appearing notably in famous Caesarea Music Festival. In August 2010 was shortly detained for an investigation by the Israeli police on suspicion of tax evasion. His fifth single Zikukim (זיקוקים) (meaning 'Fireworks'). The album has sold over 80,000 copies and certified double platinum.

=== Songwriting ===
Moshe Peretz writes most of his materials. He has also written for other artists like Sarit Hadad, Shlomi Shabat and Tamir Gal. He co-wrote with Dudu Aharon for Israeli artist Lior Narkis.

=== Personal life ===
Peretz is married to Yarden Gozlan, the sister of footballer Shoval Gozlan. The couple lives in Be'er Ya'akov, in a luxury villa which Peretz specifically had built for himself, designed by an architect he hired. It is equipped with a professional recording studio in the basement. In November 2014, their daughter Michaela was born. In June 2016, their twins Noam and Guy were born.

In March 2016, Peretz pleaded guilty to tax evasion after reaching a plea bargain. In October 2016, he was fined NIS 60,000 ($15,000) and ordered to spend 4 months' community service volunteering at an old age home in Rishon LeZion.

== In popular culture ==
- In 2009, he took part in the fifth season of Israeli version of Dancing with the Stars (in Hebrew "רוקדים עם כוכבים") broadcast on Israeli Channel 2. He reached the final and was runner-up of that year's series.
- On 25 March 25, 2010, he won the prize פרס אקו״ם For "Best achievement in music". The committee cite his skills in singing, songwriting, creating his own style that touched the feelings of the Israeli public, and for his humility, captivating personality and star qualities.
- In April 2010, he took part in Memorial Day ceremonies writing the song "עוד מעט נהפוך לשיר" to commemorate the fallen Israeli soldiers and the victims of 2006 train accident.
- In 2011, he took part in the reality television series Music Academy (in Hebrew בית ספר למוסיקה) as part of the music faculty alongside Yehoram Gaon, Keren Peles and Matti Caspi. However he missed part of the program for his tour engagements including a tour of the United States. Music Academy was broadcast on Israeli Channel 2.
- In 2012, he joined the jury of the reality television series Kokhav Nolad (in Hebrew כוכב נולד meaning A star is born), the Israeli equivalent of Idol.
- In 2012, he declared his official engagement to Yarden Gozlan, his long-time girlfriend.
- in 2013 he joined The X Factor Israel and currently serves as a judge there.

== Discography ==
=== Albums ===
- 2005: Mabit El haMromim (מביט אל המרומים) (meaning Looking at the sky/heavens). (Sale of 10,000 copies)
- 2007: Esh (אש) (meaning Fire) (sales of over 20,000 copies, certified gold)
- 2008: Elaich (אלייך) (meaning Towards You) (sales of over 40,000 copies, certified platinum)
- 2010: Me'ha'Shamaim (meaning From the sky/heavens" (sales of over 110,000 copies, certified double platinum)
- 2011: Zikukim (זיקוקים) (meaning Fireworks) (sales of over 80,000, certified double platinum)
- 2013: Kol Hamilim Hasmehot (כל המילים השמחות) (meaning All The Happy Words)
- 2015: Simaney haZman (סימני הזמן) (meaning Signs of The Time)
- 2017: Bachur Chadash (בחור חדש) (meaning New Guy)

=== Songs ===
(selective)

- From Mabit El Hamromim:
  - "שחורת עיניים", "ילד מאוהב", "האישה שלי", "דרך ארוכה"
- From Esh:
  - "זה הזמן", "כמו השקט", "יש רגעים", "בחלומות שלי", "אש"
- From Elaich
  - "ואולי", "אלייך", "כל בוקר", "נשבע לך"
- From Me'ha'shamaim:
  - "שתיים בלילה", "מהשמיים", "אשמור עלייך", "אין כמו בבית", "עד שתשובי אליי", "מה קורה איתך", "תמיד ידעתי"
- From Zikukim
  - "אין כמוך", "ארוץ עד אלייך", "קחי אותי אלייך"
