= Festigal =

Israeli children's musical show

Festigal (Hebrew: פסטיגל) is an annual Israeli song and dance musical show for children. Festigal is held every year at Hanukkah time, during the school vacation. It began as a song contest but the format gradually changed to include performances by well-known Israeli singers and actors. Each year's event is built around a particular theme or story.

== History ==
The first Festigal took place in the city of Haifa in 1981, conceived by entertainment producer Miki Peled, who later to be joined by his son, Yaron Peled. Since then, it has been held in venues nationwide. It is among the largest events during Hanukkah. For example, in 2006, about 18 million NIS were allocated for the concerts. The show was directed by Hanoch Rosen from 1997 until 2023.

== Theme songs ==
=== 2002–2015: Adapted international pop songs ===
Between 2002 and 2015, each Festigal featured a Hebrew adaptation of a popular international song, or a Hebrew remake of an older Israeli song.

- 2002: "The Ketchup Song" – שיר הקטשופ
- 2003: "Around the World" (Israeli Song) – סביב כל העולם
- 2004: "Dragostea din tei" – נומה נומה היי
- 2005: "Holding Out for a Hero" – גיבור על העולם .
- 2006: "The Final Countdown" – פסטיגל פנטזיה
- 2007: "Major Tom (Coming Home)" – זמן זה כוח
- 2008: "Can You Feel It" – תפוס ת׳פסטיגל
- 2009: "I'm So Excited" – תנו ברגליים
- 2010: "The Rhythm of the Night" – לילה מטורף בפסטיגל
- 2011: "Mr. Saxobeat" – פסטיגלi
- 2012: "Livin' la Vida Loca" – ספיי פסטיגל
- 2013: "Euphoria" – אקס פסטיגל
- 2014: "When the Rain Begins to Fall" – זמן משחקי הפסטיגל
- 2015: "Heroes" – עכשיו זה היי סקול פסטיגל

=== 2016–present: Original Hebrew theme songs ===
Beginning in 2016, Festigal returned to original Hebrew theme songs written specifically for each year's storyline.

- 2016: "Singing Together" –שרים ביחד; lyrics: Uri Gross; music: Aviv Koren
- 2017: "A Legend from Now" – אגדה מעכשיו; lyrics: Uri Gross; music: Loran De Paz
- 2018: "Freestyle Festigal" – Freestyle פסטיגל; lyrics and music: Doron Medalie
- 2019: "Connecting to Life" – להתחבר לחיים; lyrics and music: Doron Medalie
- 2020: "MY Festigal" – lyrics and music: Doron Medalie
- 2021: "Sky High" – lyrics and music: Ron Biton and Itay Shimoni
- 2022: "Festigal on Festigal – The Fantasy Comes to Life" – פסטיגל על פסטיגל- הפנטזיה מתעוררת לחיים; lyrics and music: Ron Biton and Itay Shimoni
- 2024: "Sing Festigal – Let the Music Connect Us" — Sing פסטיגל – תנו למוזיקה לחבר בינינו; lyrics and music: Ron Biton and Itay Shimoni
- 2025: "Awakening to Life" – להתעורר לחיים (IMAGINE Festigal); lyrics: Uri Orien; music: Amir Lekner

== Themes ==
From 1984, Festigal has had a different theme each year. For example, in 2010, the theme was the story of two kids lost in a museum at night with the exhibits coming to life and showing pieces of history (based on the 2006 film Night at the Museum). In 2015, the show had a high school theme loosely based on the Fame franchise and the TV show Glee.

=== List of themes ===
- 1984: Channel 1
- 1985: Robots
- 1986: Radio broadcasting
- 1987: Saving the Garden from Demolition
- 1988: The Light Kingdom
- 1989: Family
- 1990: Fight of the Festigal
- 1991: Hanny'le and the Saturday Dress
- 1992: To Be a Star
- 1993: Father and Daughter at Festigal
- 1994: Television
- 1995: Animals
- 1996: Circus – מורידים את הכוכבים מהשמיים
- 1997: Amusement park – כי העולם שייך לילדים
- 1998: Dreams – הבחירה של הילדים
- 1999: Millennium – הפסטיגל של המילניום הבא
- 2000: Toys – צעצוע של פסטיגל
- 2001: Telenovela – פלאנובלה של פסטיגל
- 2002: Cinematography – פסטיגל מהסרטים
- 2003: World Tour – פסטיגל סובב עולם
- 2004: Fairy tales – לא יאומן כי פסטיגל
- 2005: Superheroes – פסטיגל גיבורי על
- 2006: Fantasy – פסטיגל גיבורי הממלכה האבודה
- 2007: Time travel – פסטיגל על הזמן
- 2008: Underwater – תפוס ת׳פסטיגל – הרפתקה במצולות
- 2009: Kung fu – קונג פו פסטיגל
- 2010: History – לילה מטורף בפסטיגל
- 2011: Cyberspace – איי פסטיגל
- 2012: Spying – ספיי פסטיגל
- 2013: The Four Elements – אקס פסטיגל
- 2014: The Hunger Games – משחקי הפסטיגל
- 2015 and 2016: High school – היי סקול פסטיגל / היי סקול פסטיגל 2: הגמר הגדול
- 2017: Urban legend – סטורי של פסטיגל
- 2018: Dance – FreeStyle# פסטיגל
- 2019: Cyberspace – פסטיגל Play
- 2020: 40th Anniversary – פסטיגל My
- 2021: Angels – פסטיגל Sky High
- 2022: Parallel Universes — פסטיגל על פסטיגל
- 2024: Music — SING פסטיגל
- 2025: Imagine — פסטיגל אימג'ין

== See also ==
- Dance in Israel
- Music of Israel
- Culture of Israel
