= List of radio stations in Israel =

This is a list of radio stations in Israel.

== Public radio stations ==
=== North and Upper Galilee ===
Frequency	Name	Website	Format	Language	Live Stream
88.0 FM	Kan 88			Hebrew	
89.7 FM	Kan Gimel		Israeli music	Hebrew	
90.8 FM	Kan Moreshet			Hebrew	
95.0 FM	Kan Bet			Hebrew	
97.2 FM	Kan Kol Hamusica		Classical	Hebrew	
99.3 FM	Makan			Arabic	
101.3 FM	Kan Reka		PBS	multiple	
104.9 FM	Kan Tarbut		News	Hebrew	

=== Tsfat area ===
Frequency	Name	Website	Format	Language	Live Stream	Callsign
87.6 FM; 88.2 FM	Kan 88			Hebrew		SGGA
88.8 FM	Makan			Arabic		BHBU
90.5 FM; 92.5 FM	Kan Moreshet			Hebrew		KIKX
91.3 FM	Kan Kol Hamusica		Classical	Hebrew		VSGD
95.2 FM; 95.5 FM	Kan Bet			Hebrew		FHDH
97.5 FM; 97.8 FM	Kan Gimel		Israeli music	Hebrew		LXIX
100.3 FM	Kan Reka		PBS	multiple		
105.1 FM	Kan Tarbut			Hebrew		JJDD

=== Haifa area ===
Frequency	Name	Website	Format	Language	Live Stream
88.5 FM	Kan 88			Hebrew	
90.5 FM; 100.7 FM	Kan Moreshet			Hebrew	
92.3 FM; 99.3 FM	Makan			Arabic	
94.5 FM; 95.0 FM	Kan Bet			Hebrew	
98.5 FM	Kan Kol Hamusica		Classical	Hebrew	
101.3 FM; 101.8 FM	Kan Reka			multiple	
104.7 FM; 104.9 FM	Kan Tarbut			Hebrew	
105.3 FM	Radio Kol HaGalil Haelion			Hebrew	
105.5 FM	Kan Gimel		Israeli music	Hebrew	
106.0FM	Radio Kol Yizrael			Hebrew	
106.1 FM	Radio Kol Galim			Hebrew	

=== Beit She'an area ===
Frequency	Name	Website	Format	Language	Live Stream
88.2 FM	Kan 88			Hebrew	
93.7 FM	Makan			Arabic	
95.2 FM	Kan Bet			Hebrew	
97.5 FM	Kan Gimel		Israeli music	Hebrew	
100.5 FM	Kan Reka			multiple	

=== Northern Jordan Valley ===
Frequency	Name	Website	Format	Language	Live Stream
88.0 FM	Kan 88			Hebrew	
89.7 FM; 105.5 FM	Kan Gimel		Israeli music	Hebrew	
90.8 FM	Kan Moreshet			Hebrew	
92.3 FM	Makan			Arabic	
94.5 FM; 95.0 FM	Kan Bet			Hebrew	
97.2 FM	Kan Kol Hamusica		Classical	Hebrew	
101.3 FM	Kan Reka			multiple	
104.9 FM	Kan Tarbut		News	Hebrew	

=== Netanya ===
Frequency	Name	Website	Format	Language	Live Stream
90.5 FM	Kan Moreshet			Hebrew	
100.5 FM	Kan Reka			multiple	

=== Central Israel ===
Frequency	Name	Website	Format	Language	Live Stream
88.0 FM	Kan 88			Hebrew	
89.7 FM	Kan Gimel		Israeli music	Hebrew	
90.8 FM	Kan Moreshet			Hebrew	
91.8 FM	Galgalatz		Army Radio Modern Music/News	Hebrew	
95.0 FM	Kan Bet			Hebrew	
97.2 FM	Kan Kol Hamusica		Classical	Hebrew	
101.3 FM	Kan Reka			multiple	
103.6 FM	Radio Kol Ramat HaSharon			Hebrew	
103.6 FM	Radio Kol HaShfela		Adult hits / EDM	Hebrew	
104.9 FM	Kan Tarbut			Hebrew	
106.2 FM	Radio Kol Rishonim			Hebrew	

=== Judea and Samaria Area ===
Frequency	Name	Website	Format	Language	Live Stream
88.2 FM	Kan 88			Hebrew	
90.5 FM	Kan Moreshet			Hebrew	
93.7 FM	Makan			Arabic	
95.2 FM	Kan Bet			Hebrew	
97.5 FM	Kan Gimel		Israeli music	Hebrew	
100.5 FM	Kan Reka			multiple	
103.65 FM	Kan Kol Hamusica		Classical	Hebrew	
105.3 FM	Kan Tarbut			Hebrew	

=== Jerusalem and its region ===
Frequency	Name	Website	Format	Language	Live Stream
87.6 FM; 88.0 FM; 88.2 FM	Kan 88			Hebrew	
89.7 FM; 97.5 FM; 97.8 FM	Kan Gimel		Israeli music	Hebrew	
90.5 FM; 90.8 FM	Kan Moreshet			Hebrew	
91.3 FM; 97.2 FM	Kan Kol Hamusica		Classical	Hebrew	
93.7 FM; 99.3 FM	Makan			Arabic	
95.0 FM; 95.2 FM; 95.5 FM	Kan Bet			Hebrew	
100.3 FM; 100.5 FM; 101.3 FM	Kan Reka			multiple	
104.9 FM; 105.1 FM; 105.3 FM	Kan Tarbut		Jazz / Adult contemporary music / Culture	Hebrew	

=== Be'er Sheva area ===
Frequency	Name	Website	Format	Language	Live Stream
88.5 FM	Kan 88			Hebrew	
89.7 FM; 105.5 FM	Kan Gimel		Israeli music	Hebrew	
90.8 FM; 100.7 FM	Kan Moreshet			Hebrew	
92.3 FM; 99.3 FM	Makan			Arabic	
93.5 FM	Galgalatz		Army Radio Modern Music/News	Hebrew	
94.5 FM; 95.0 FM	Kan Bet			Hebrew	
98.5 FM	Kan Kol Hamusica		Classical	Hebrew	
101.3 FM; 101.8 FM	Kan Reka			multiple	
104.0 FM	Galei Tzahal		Army Radio Oldies/Talk	Hebrew	
104.7 FM	Kan Tarbut			Hebrew	

=== Central Negev ===
Frequency	Name	Website	Format	Language	Live Stream
88.0 FM	Kan 88			Hebrew	
89.7 FM	Kan Gimel		Israeli music	Hebrew	
90.8 FM	Kan Moreshet			Hebrew	
95.0 FM	Kan Bet			Hebrew	
97.2 FM	Kan Kol Hamusica		Classical	Hebrew	
101.3 FM	Kan Reka			multiple	
104.9 FM	Kan Tarbut		News	Hebrew	

=== Northern Arava ===
Frequency	Name	Website	Format	Language	Live Stream
88.2 FM	Kan 88			Hebrew	
89.7 FM; 97.5 FM	Kan Gimel		Israeli music	Hebrew	
95.0 FM; 95.2 FM	Kan Bet			Hebrew	
101.3 FM	Kan Reka			multiple	

=== Southern Arava ===
Frequency	Name	Website	Format	Language	Live Stream
87.6 FM	Kan 88			Hebrew	
91.3 FM	Kan Kol Hamusica		Classical	Hebrew	
95.5 FM	Kan Bet			Hebrew	
97.8 FM	Kan Gimel		Israeli music	Hebrew	

=== Eilat ===
Frequency	Name	Website	Format	Language	Live Stream
88.5 FM	Kan 88			Hebrew	
89.7 FM	Kan Gimel		Israeli music	Hebrew	
92.3 FM	Makan			Arabic	
94.5 FM	Kan Bet			Hebrew	
98.5 FM	Kan Kol Hamusica		Classical	Hebrew	
100.7 FM	Kan Moreshet			Hebrew	
101.8 FM	Kan Reka			multiple	
104.7 FM	Kan Tarbut		News	Hebrew	

== Commercial radio stations ==
=== Central Israel ===
Frequency	Name	Website	Format	Language	Live Stream
90.0 FM; 94.7 FM	Radio 90FM			Hebrew	
90.2 FM; 103.0 FM	103fm			Hebrew	
91.0 FM; 93.3 FM	Radio Lev HaMedina			Hebrew	
92.1 FM	Kol BaRama		Haredi	Hebrew	
92.8 FM; 93.0 FM	Kol Chai		Haredi / National Religious	Hebrew	
96.3 FM; 100.0 FM	Radios 100FM (Note: also spelled Radius 100FM)		Pop	Hebrew, English	
99.0 FM	eco99fm			Hebrew	
99.6 FM; 102.0 FM	Radio Tel Aviv		Popular Israeli and American hit songs	Hebrew, English	
102.5 FM	Kol Chai Music			Hebrew	

=== Haifa area ===
Frequency	Name	Website	Format	Language	Live Stream
91.5 FM; 96.0 FM	Kol Rega			Hebrew	
99.5 FM	HamEsh			Hebrew	
106.4 FM	Muzyka 106.4 FM			Russian	
107.5 FM	Radio Haifa			Hebrew	

=== Jerusalem and its area ===
Frequency	Name	Website	Format	Language	Live Stream
89.1 FM	Pervoye Radio			Russian	
92.1 FM; 105.7 FM	Kol BaRama		Haredi	Hebrew	
92.8 FM; 93.0 FM	Kol Chai		Haredi / National Religious	Hebrew	
89.5 FM; 101.0 FM	Radio Jerusalem		News / Music / Sports	Hebrew	
89.3 FM; 94.0 FM; 106.5 FM	Galei Yisrael		News / Music / National Religious	Hebrew	
107.6 FM	Kol Play		Music / National Religious	Hebrew	

=== Judea and Samaria Area ===
Frequency	Name	Website	Format	Language	Live Stream
89.3 FM; 94.0 FM; 106.5 FM	Galei Yisrael		News / Music / National Religious	Hebrew	

=== North and Upper Galilee ===
Frequency	Name	Website	Format	Language	Live Stream
98.1 FM; 101.1 FM	Ashams			Arabic	
101.5 FM	Radio Hatahana			Hebrew	
103.3 FM; 107.8 FM	Radio Al-Nas			Hebrew	
104.5 FM	Radio Tzafon			Hebrew	

=== Be'er Sheva area ===
Frequency	Name	Website	Format	Language	Live Stream
95.8 FM; 97.0 FM; 101.5 FM	Radio Darom			Hebrew	

=== Eilat ===
Frequency	Name	Website	Format	Language	Live Stream
102.0 FM	Radio Eilat			Hebrew	

== Student radio stations ==
=== Central Israel ===
Frequency	Name	Website	Format	Language	Live Stream
106.2 FM	AudioVersity			Hebrew	

=== Haifa area ===
Frequency	Name	Website	Format	Language	Live Stream
103.6 FM	Radio Oranim			Hebrew	

== See also ==
- Media of Israel
