= Voice of Israel (disambiguation) =

Voice of Israel may refer to:

- A book by Abba Eban.
- Radio services from Israel Broadcasting Authority
  - Kol Yisrael (Hebrew for "Voice of Israel"), the domestic services
  - Israel Radio International, the international service, also known as Voice of Israel
- Voice of Israel, a former private internet radio station active between 2014 and 2015
- The Voice Israel, an Israeli reality singing competition
