= Kan Reka =

Multilingual radio service of Israel

- Israel
- Frequencies: 100.3 FM; 100.5 FM; 101.3 FM; 101.8 FM

Programming
- Languages: Amharic; English; Bukharian; Georgian; Yiddish; Ladino; Spanish; French; Russian; Persian

Ownership
- Owner: Israeli Public Broadcasting Corporation

History
- First air date: 15 May 2017; 9 years ago

Links
- Webcast: Live stream
- Website: www.kan.org.il/content/kan/kan-reka/

Kan Reka (English pronunciation: /ˈkɑːn ˈrɛkə/; Hebrew: כאן רק"ע), also styled KAN REKA and Radio Reka, is a multilingual radio service of the Israeli Public Broadcasting Corporation (IPBC). It broadcasts news, current affairs, culture, music and other programming in languages used by immigrant communities in Israel, and is also available to listeners outside Israel through online streaming and digital platforms.

The name Reka is an acronym of רשת קליטת עלייה (Reshet Klitat Aliyah), meaning "Aliyah Absorption Network". The service continues the foreign-language broadcasting functions formerly carried out by the Israel Broadcasting Authority's Reka service and by Kol Yisrael's overseas broadcasting division.

== Programming ==
Kan Reka is presented by Kan as "the Israeli home of foreign languages". Its website provides live streaming, programme pages and podcasts in several languages. The current language sections listed by Kan include Amharic, English, Bukharian, Georgian, Yiddish, Ladino, Spanish, French, Russian and Persian.

The station's output includes news bulletins, current-affairs programmes, interviews, cultural programming, music, Hebrew-learning material and programmes of interest to immigrant communities in Israel. Kan also carries foreign-language podcasts connected with the service, including English, Spanish, French and Russian-language programmes.

Arabic-language radio broadcasting is operated separately by Kan's Arabic radio service, Radio Makan, rather than as part of Kan Reka.

== Distribution ==
Kan Reka is broadcast in Israel on FM. Kan's current reception information lists Reka on 100.3, 100.5, 101.3 and 101.8 MHz, with the available frequency varying by region. Kan advises listeners to test the four national FM frequencies and notes that car radios using RDS should switch automatically between the network's frequencies where supported.

For home reception, Kan states that its radio services are also distributed through DVB-T2, cable and satellite television providers, including HOT, Yes, Cellcom TV, Partner TV and Free TV. Kan also lists satellite reception through Eutelsat E8WB East Beam, following the end of distribution on Amos 7 in 2025.

Kan Reka is also available worldwide through Kan's website and digital platforms.

== History ==
Kan Reka began broadcasting under the Israeli Public Broadcasting Corporation when the IPBC replaced the Israel Broadcasting Authority as Israel's public broadcaster in May 2017. The IPBC, branded as Kan in Hebrew and Makan in Arabic, was created under Israel's 2014 public broadcasting legislation.

The service inherited the immigrant and foreign-language broadcasting role of the former IBA Reka network. That earlier service developed from Kol Yisrael's foreign-language and overseas broadcasts, including the shortwave service historically known as Israel Radio International. Unlike the former IBA overseas service, Kan's current reception information does not list shortwave transmission for Kan Reka; it lists FM, digital terrestrial, cable, satellite and online reception.

== See also ==
- Israeli Public Broadcasting Corporation
- Israel Broadcasting Authority
- Kol Yisrael
- Makan 33
- Media of Israel
- Radio in Israel
