= Iranian Jews in Israel =

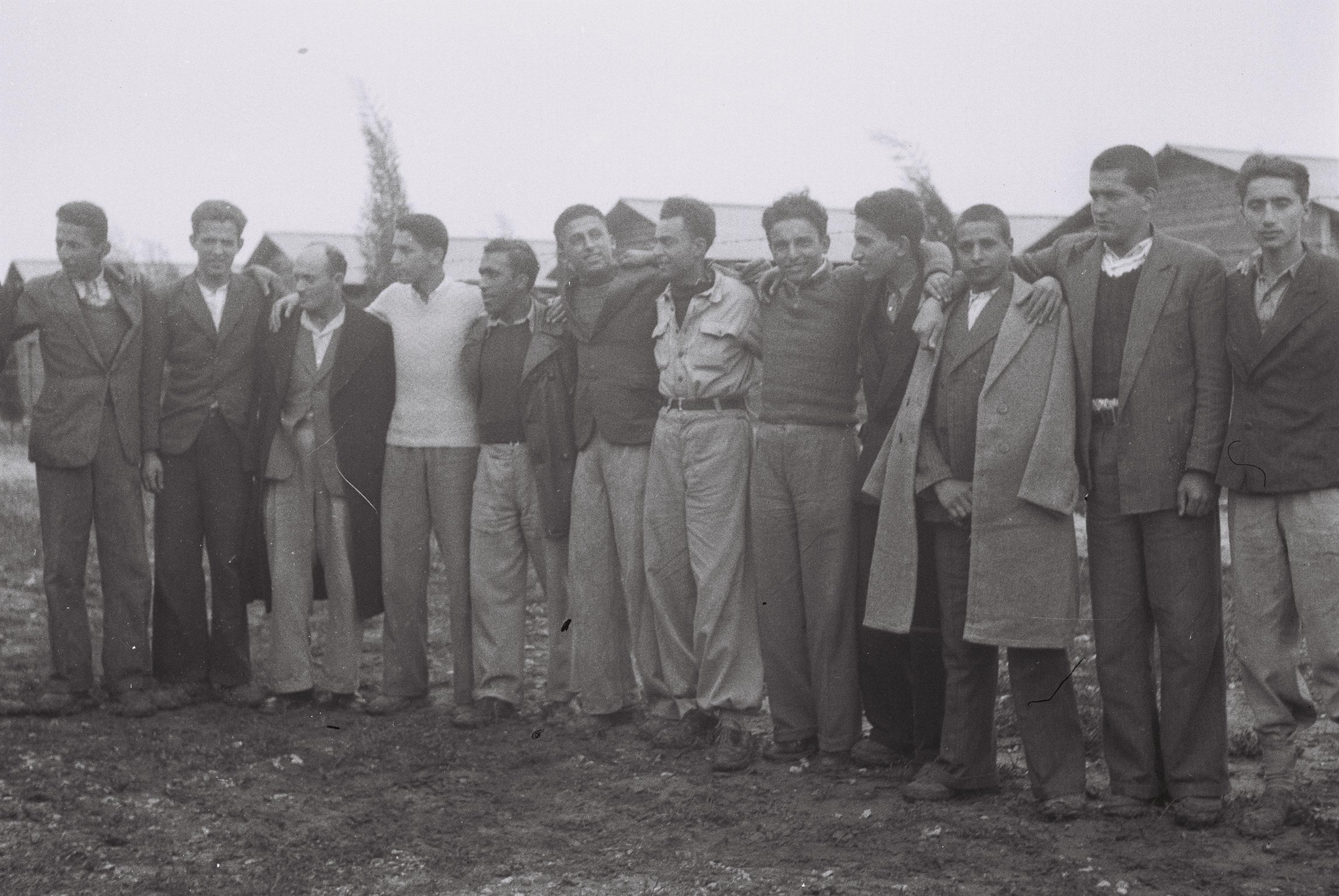
- A group of Persian Jewish immigrants at the Atlit immigrant camp, 1944

Total population
- 200,000 - 250,000

Regions with significant populations
- Jerusalem, Netanya, Kfar Saba

Languages
- Hebrew, Iranian languages (Persian)

Religion
- Judaism

Related ethnic groups
- Other Jews

Iranian Jews immigrated to Ottoman Palestine, Mandatory Palestine, and later the State of Israel. Iranian Jews in Israel number more than 200,000 and most of them are Israeli born.

== History ==
The first Iranian Jews to settle in Ottoman Palestine were from Shiraz. They left in 1815 in a caravan, making their way to the port of Bushehr and from there boarded a ship to Basra in southern Iraq. From there, they traveled by land to Baghdad and Damascus. Those who survived the difficult journey settled in Tzfat and Jerusalem, establishing the nucleus of the Iranian Jewish community in these cities.

After the establishment of the State of Israel, immigration increased significantly. From 1948 to 1952, approximately 30,000 Iranian Jews immigrated to Israel under the Israeli mission Operation Cyrus. In the 1950s, the Israeli treatment of Iranian Jews was similar to the Israeli treatment of other Jews from the Middle Eastern and North African region. Since the establishment of the State of Israel in 1948, over 200,000 Iranians have settled in Israel.

Many Iranian Jews immigrated to Israel after the Iranian Revolution in 1979. Following the revolution, an additional 10,000 to 15,000 Iranian Jews immigrated directly to Israel. Many others migrated first to the United States or Europe and then to Israel, mainly out of fear of the Ayatollah's regime but also from lack of familiarity with Israel. Some fled after Habib Elghanian was murdered after being accused of "Zionism."

Israel continues to encourage the remaining Jews in Iran (less than 9,000) to immigrate, since Israel sees them as hostages of the Iranian regime. In 2007, Israel offered monetary incentives to Jews in Iran to encourage Iranian Jewish immigration to Israel. Jews of Iranian descent in Israel are considered Mizrahim. A Mizrahi Jew, broadly construed, is a Jewish person from North Africa and Asia.

Kol Israel transmits daily radio broadcasts to Iran in the Persian language and Menashe Amir, an Iranian Jew, hosts a talk show that draws callers from Iran.

== Notable Israelis of Iranian-jewish descent ==
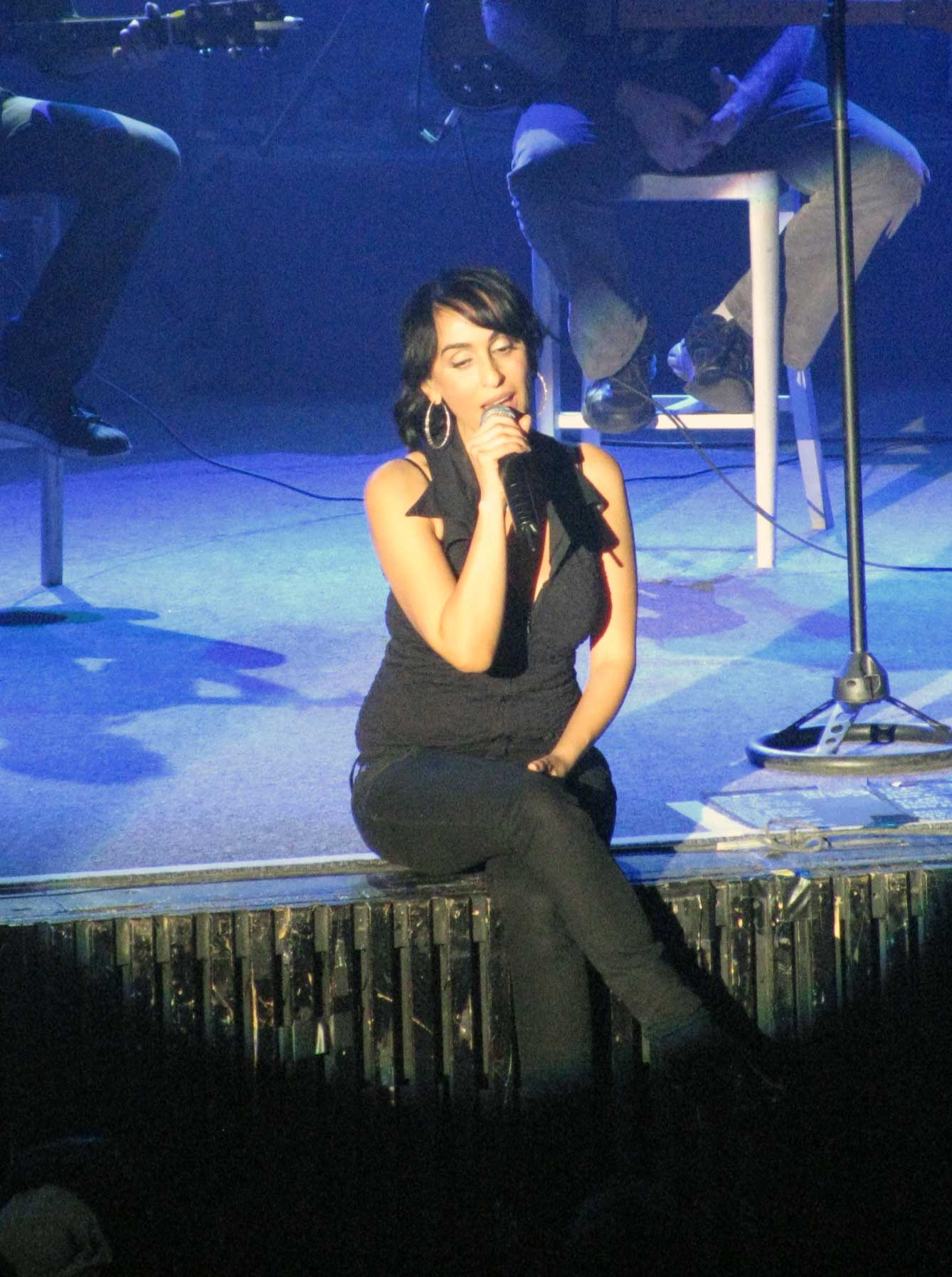
Rita Kleinstein, an Israeli pop-star, of Persian descent

- Joel Simkhai - founder of Grindr
- David Rokni - Israeli colonel
- Eliezer Avtabi - Israeli politician
- Yossi Avni-Levy - Israeli ambassador, diplomat
- Galit Distel-Atbaryan - Israeli politician, writer
- Nitsana Darshan-Leitner - Israeli attorney
- Sharon Roffe Ofir - Israeli journalist, politician
- Eli Avivi - founder of the micronation Akhzivland
- Menashe Amir – Broadcaster in the Persian-language Kol Israel radio
- Yigal Sebty - Iranian books Writer/Translator & Broadcaster in the Persian-language Kol Israel radio - retired in 2014
- Orly (Fernos) Rem - Broadcaster and director of the Persian-language Kol Israel radio
- Sima Bachar – Mrs. Israel 2005
- Michael Ben-Ari – Israeli politician
- Dan Halutz – Former chief of Staff of the Israel Defense Forces
- Mor Karbasi – Singer
- Moshe Katsav – Former president of Israel
- Rita Kleinstein – Israeli pop singer
- Shaul Mofaz – Former IDF chief of staff and Israeli minister of transport. Had been elected the chairman of the Kadima.
- Mordechai Zar – Israeli politician and former member of the Knesset
- Ramtin Sebty – Head of the IDF's nonconventional weapons defensive alignment
- Zion Evrony – Israel's ambassador to the Vatican and former ambassador to Ireland
- Yosef Shiloach – Israeli comedy actor
- Lior Eliyahu – Israeli professional basketball player
- Ofir Davidzada – Israeli football player
- Liraz Charhi – Israeli actress, singer
- Moussa B. H. Youdim – Professor Emeritus, Winner of Israel Prize for Life Science.

== See also ==
- History of the Jews in Iran
- Jewish ethnic divisions
- Iran–Israel relations
