= Oded Napchi =

Israeli media executive, entrepreneur and researcher

- Education: Tel Aviv University
- Occupations: Media executive entrepreneur researcher
- Known for: Co-founding Galgalatz and Valis

Oded Napchi is an Israeli executive and researcher. He was among the founders of Galgalatz, later managed the station and The Children's Channel, and went on to co-found the mobile media company Valis. He later held senior product, marketing and strategy roles at HIRO Media. Co-founder and CEO of Althimis Inc., a defense tech speciliazes in trainning and simulation software for unmanned systems (UAS) and counter-UAS.

== Life ==
Napchi studied philosophy and humanities at Tel Aviv University. In Israeli media, Napchi was among the founders of Galgalatz and later managed the station. He also went on to manage The Children's Channel.

In 1999, Napchi co-founded Valis with Ariel Napchi and Ronny Golan. The company developed location-based community services for mobile carriers, and in 2001 signed a deal with Vodafone. Valis later merged with Celltrex to form Axis Mobile.

In the 2000s, Napchi joined the Tel Aviv-based online video advertising company HIRO Media, working with the same co-founding partners as at Valis, and helped pivot it into a supply-side platform for video monetization.

After leaving HIRO Media, Napchi co-founded Daimon, an AI-focused startup intended to address television viewership and recommendation problems. He subsequently became CEO of Althimis (formerly known as Meetaverse), a defense-technology company that markets a unified cloud-based platform for training, simulation, and mission planning of unmanned aerial systems (UAS).

== Writing ==
Napchi has published writing on recommendation systems, media behaviour, and innovation. In 2018 he published the article Content Recommendations and the Creation of Emotions in Boxes and Arrows. In 2022 he contributed the chapter The Challenge of Being Lazy to the Springer volume Transitioning Media in a Post COVID World.
