= IBA News =

- Country: Israel
- Broadcast area: Israel
- Headquarters: Israel

Programming
- Picture format: 720p and 1080p (converting) (HDTV) 576i for SDTVs

Until May 2017, the Israel Broadcasting Authority (IBA) provided news programming, IBA News, in 14 foreign languages directed at audiences abroad or in Israel. The goal of these programs is to present a balanced and impartial picture of what happens in Israel in particular and in the region in general. Each language has its own schedule of programs focusing on news, political, social, educational, economic, technological and cultural issues.

== Video programming ==
The daily IBA English News broadcast was available on-demand via the IBA World website. News Anchors are Erin Viner, Laura Cornfield and Arieh O'Sullivan. Chief Editor is Steve Leibowitz, Senior Editor and Correspondents include Efrat Battat and Brian Freeman. IBA News was broadcast on Israel Channel One at 4:50 PM Sunday-Thursday, and Channel 33 Sunday- Thursday at 5:00 PM. Friday and Saturday broadcasts are at 6:00 PM on Channel 33 only. The weekly IBA Close-Up magazine formerly used to complement the English newscast.

The IBA News program is rebroadcast on certain Christian broadcasting channels, primarily LeSEA. This includes METV Middle East Television. In the US, the IBA News English language program airs on the satellite channel WHT (DirecTV channel 367) at 6:00 PM (Eastern time.) The IBA News also airs multiple times a day on JBS Jewish Broadcasting Service. As of January 1, 2013, the IBA News is no longer on the MHz WorldView channel. That timeslot was replaced with JN1 Jewish News 1.

== Audio programming ==
The IBA provides daily audio programming with news and views from Israel. The programs may be listened to on the internet live and on-demand via IBA World, On-demand audio becomes available about 20 minutes after the end of a live broadcast. IBA audio programming is available in the following languages: English, French, Russian, Moroccan Arabic, Amharic, Bukhori, Persian, Romanian, Ladino, Spanish, Yiddish, Tigrinya, and Hungarian.

Weekly audio magazine programs in English titled Weekend Report, Sunday Edition, Culture Report and Face to Face are available on the IBA World website. The IBA World website also provides Hebrew language lessons and an archive of certain historical radio broadcasts.

Two programs in English also available via the World Radio International WRN stream. The on-demand audio is no longer available.

== News headlines ==
IBA World also provides text news headlines, local weather in Israel, and foreign exchange rates for the US Dollar, the Euro and British Pound Sterling.

== See also ==
- Culture of Israel
- Israel Broadcasting Authority
- Israel Radio International, the official radio service for immigrants and for listeners outside Israel
- Kol Yerushalayim, the Hebrew program of Jerusalem Calling, the radio station of the British Mandatory Authority
- Kol Yisrael, Israel's public domestic and international radio service.
- Media of Israel
- The Farsi section of Israel Radio
