= Shazamat =

Israeli hip hop and indie rock band

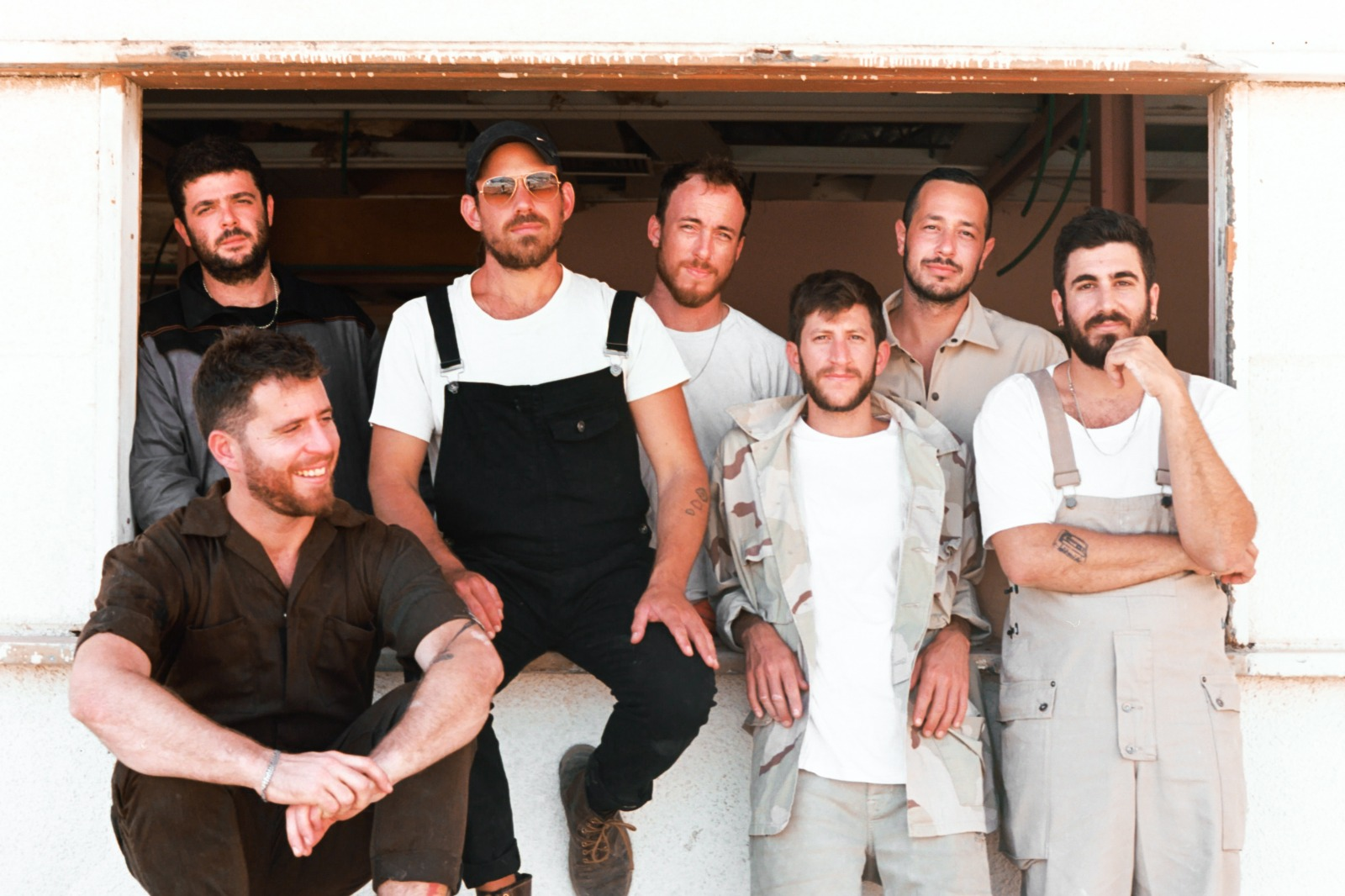

Background information
- Origin: Tel Aviv
- Genres: R&B; pop; hip hop
- Occupations: Musicians; singers; Songwriters; producers
- Years active: 2017–present
- Labels: School Boy; Republic
- Members: Nir "Ashken" Ashkenazi; Gideon "Jacques" Targano

Shazamat is an Israeli hip hop, rock and alternative punk band.

== History ==
Shazamat began to take shape as a band in 2017 (all original band members were from the northern region). In 2018, the band performed at the Indingab Festival (they performed at the festival again in 2022).

In 2019, the band's first album, "Dismantled Car", was released on the independent label Mulu Records. In 2020, under the influence of the Corona pandemic, the band released an EP album called "Let's Relax".

In October 2021, the band released a concept album called "We Woke Up Late". The album was chosen as one of Galgalatz Alternative Albums of the Year. One of the songs from the album, "National League", was included in the station's playlist tonight. In 2022, the single "Yoshev alai bul" entered the Galgalatz playlist.

The band released three singles from their third album, Sikhat Litufim, released on July 19, 2023, which featured 15 songs.

== Musical influences ==
The band plays hip-hop with influences from rock and punk combined with social messages. The band frequently performs alongside other hip-hop artists, including Teddy Ngosa (guest on the song Liga Leumit), Jimbo Jay (narrator on the album "We Woke Up Late") and Avraham Legsa (on the song "Aquarium").

== Discography ==
=== Album ===
- 2019 - רכב מפורק
- 2020 - בוא נרגע (EP)
- 2021 - התעוררנו מאוחר
- 2023 - שיחת ליטופים
- 2024 - תופס אוויר

== Members ==
- Nir "Ashken" Ashkenazi (rapper)
- Gideon "Jacques" Targano (rapper, darbuka)
- Nimrod Vialegos (guitar)
- Reef Shapira (keyboards)
- Itai "Itai" Greenberg (drums)
- Aviad Duvdevani (bass) since 2020
- Shay Colbert (production, guitar)

=== Former members ===
- Omer Liber (bass) 2017-2020
