= Kol Yisrael in Arabic =

Former Israeli radio service

Kol Yisrael in Arabic Sawt Isra'il (صوت إسرائيل)
- Knesset member Faris Hamdan on air with the station's Yitzhak Ben-Ovadia and Shaul Bar-Haim, 1952
- Israel
- Frequency: 737–738 kHz MW

Programming
- Language: Arabic
- Format: News, current affairs, music

Ownership
- Owner: Kol Yisrael (Israel Broadcasting Authority from 1965)

History
- First air date: 1948
- Last air date: 10 May 2017

Kol Yisrael in Arabic (Arabic: صوت إسرائيل بالعربية, Sawt Isra'il bil-'Arabiyya), also known as Reshet Dalet (Hebrew: רשת ד', "Network D"), was the Arabic-language radio service of Israel's public broadcaster Kol Yisrael from 1948 to 2017. Founded during the 1948 Arab–Israeli War, with roots in the Haganah's clandestine Arabic broadcasts, it began as a department of the Hebrew service and became a separate network in 1958. It was staffed largely by Jewish immigrants from Arab countries, later joined by Arab citizens of Israel, and addressed listeners across the Arab world as well as Arab citizens of Israel and the West Bank.

Alongside news it broadcast music, drama and propaganda programmes such as Lies and Facts, which set Arab leaders' recorded statements against Israel's account of events, and in 1966 the Mossad used a song played on the station as the go-ahead signal for an Iraqi pilot's defection. By the late 1970s it was transmitting on medium wave with 1,200 kW, and it built a large audience in neighbouring countries, where many listeners were reported to regard its news as more reliable than that of their own state radio. Rival Arab stations and a 2023 documentary have portrayed it as an instrument of propaganda and psychological warfare, while the historian Yuval Evri argues that this view overlooks its place in the history of Arabic radio and culture. After the peace treaty with Egypt its attention turned increasingly to Arab citizens of Israel, and its audience abroad declined, a change that former staff variously attributed to Arab satellite television and to the dismantling of its transmitter in 2003. It went off the air with the closure of the Israel Broadcasting Authority in May 2017 and was succeeded by Radio Makan of the Israeli Public Broadcasting Corporation.

== History ==
=== Origins and early years ===
The service had roots in the Arabic broadcasts of the Haganah's clandestine radio between 1945 and 1948, which were for a time headed by Shaul Bar-Haim, an immigrant from Iraq who later became director of Israel Radio's Arabic service.

The new state's official Arabic broadcasts were initiated by the diplomat Eliyahu Sasson during the 1948 Arab–Israeli War. According to historian Yuval Evri, the service started that year as a division of the Hebrew-language Kol Yisrael, and its stated purpose was to promote Israel's standing and to shape public opinion both in the Arab countries and among Arab citizens of Israel. It went on the air for about an hour and a half a day, and its hours grew over the following years.

According to Shaul Menashe, who edited the station's programme Lies and Facts from 1959 to 1973, David Ben-Gurion said at the service's founding that while Kol Yisrael in Hebrew mattered for information and education, its Arabic counterpart mattered for security. Menashe describes the tasks assigned to it as working for peace, deterring war, making Israel present in Arab public awareness, and in the event of war serving as a mouthpiece of the Israel Defense Forces. Until the 1956 war the service was poorly resourced, with a staff of six or seven, all from Arab countries; its first director was Shaul Bar-Haim, followed by Yaakov Hazma, Tzadok Ben-Meir and David Sagiv. After 1956 Ezra Danin took charge of its policy for eleven years. He obtained a larger budget and staff, which numbered about fifty by 1960, and expanded Arabic airtime from three to seven and a half hours a day, alongside half an hour in Persian. A steering committee that included the prime minister's secretary Yitzhak Navon and representatives of the Foreign Ministry and military intelligence met weekly to set the station's information lines.

After the Sinai campaign of 1956 it was decided to split the Arabic service off from the Hebrew one, and it became known in Arabic as "the Israeli Broadcasting House". In 1958 the Arabic service began operating as its own network, Reshet Dalet.

Most of the staff were Jewish immigrants from Arab countries for whom Arabic was a native language, above all Iraqi and Egyptian Jews. Arab citizens of Israel joined in growing numbers over time. Several broadcasters appeared under pseudonyms or invented radio personas, among them Eliyahu Nawi as the storyteller "Dawud al-Natur" and Salman Dabi as "Ibn al-Rafidayn"; their programmes were very popular and ran for many years. Beyond news and commentary, the station aired drama, satire, music, and programs on agriculture, medicine, law and history. Its house orchestra, which had operated on a small scale from the start, took its best-known form after the arrival of the Egyptian-born musician Zuzu Musa and became one of the station's most popular features. By the late 1960s the station was on the air 14 hours a day with a staff of about 150, and some of its people went on to launch Israel's Arabic-language television broadcasts.

=== Wartime broadcasting ===
According to Menashe, the wartime task of serving as the army's voice was carried out most fully in the Six-Day War and the Yom Kippur War. Danin, who directed its policy, wrote in his memoirs that credibility was his guiding principle but that he occasionally departed from it, as during the Yom Kippur War, when the station aired inaccurate reports and its credibility suffered for a time. During the 1982 Lebanon War civilians across Lebanon tuned in to learn where Israeli forces were advancing, and the service broadcast official announcements and calls to surrender to PLO fighters, Syrian troops and the Lebanese population; the head of the Arabic service, Edmond Zehayek, said these were explicitly attributed to the Israel Defense Forces rather than to the station, in order to protect its credibility. It also aired greetings to their families from Syrian prisoners of war held in Israel until 1984.

=== Transmitter ===
By the late 1970s Reshet Dalet was transmitting on 738 kHz with 1,200 kW, and in 1984 The Christian Science Monitor described the Arabic service as having the most powerful radio broadcasting operation in Israel at its disposal. The transmitter stood at the "Hillel" broadcasting site near Kadima, and its signal reached deep into the Middle East. The community of Tzoran was later built close to the site, and after pressure from residents worried about electromagnetic radiation, the antennas were taken down at the end of 2003. The Reshet Aleph transmitter at the same site was closed at the same time.

=== Later years and closure ===
The Broadcasting Authority Law of 1965 required the IBA to broadcast in Arabic both for the needs of the Arabic-speaking population and to promote understanding and peace with neighbouring countries. The political scientist Amal Jamal has criticised the law for speaking of Arabic-speaking residents rather than Arab citizens, and for aiming to secure their loyalty and serve the state's needs rather than meet theirs; Arnon Gross, a member of the station's staff from the 1970s, acknowledged that the clause was meant to give legitimacy to propaganda work. After the peace treaty with Egypt the station's attention turned increasingly to Arab citizens of Israel, and during the peace process of the 1990s it dropped the name "Israeli Broadcasting House" in favour of "Kol Yisrael in Arabic", a shift that, according to the historian Mustafa Kabha, was halted by the Second Intifada in 2000. The station also remained available for military and political use: the IDF used it extensively for psychological warfare during the 1991 Gulf War, and in 1997 the communications minister asked the IBA's director-general to use its broadcasts to jam the Palestinian Authority's Voice of Palestine over complaints of incitement.

In 2010 the director-general of the Prime Minister's Office, Eyal Gabbai, instructed the Broadcasting Authority, as part of a planned reform, to strengthen the radio transmitters so that Kol Yisrael in Arabic could be received in every Arab population centre in Israel.

Kol Yisrael's radio networks ended regular programming on 10 May 2017 as the Israel Broadcasting Authority was wound up, and carried only music and hourly news until the new public broadcaster took over on 15 May. Its place was taken by Radio Makan of the new corporation; in a 2020 survey for the Government Advertising Bureau it was the second most-heard station among Arab citizens, behind the regional station Radio a-Shams.

== Programming and role ==
=== Music and drama ===
Music and drama filled much of the schedule. Thousands of new musical works, mostly by Iraqi- and Egyptian-born Jewish musicians, were composed for and aired on the station, and its entertainment department, headed by the Egyptian-Jewish writer Maurice Shammas ("Abu Farid"), wrote and produced hundreds of radio plays; the tales told on air by Nawi and Dabi were later collected in books in Hebrew and Arabic. Like other Arabic stations, it opened its broadcast day with a reading from the Quran. Evri notes that it also had a large Mizrahi audience in Israel, which listened to it alongside the Egyptian stations, and argues that treating the station purely as an instrument of propaganda misses its place in the history of Arabic radio and culture in the region.

=== "Lies and Facts" ===
TThe station's propaganda programme Lies and Facts (الأكاذيب والحقائق), was conceived after the 1956 war against the background of Nasserism. It set recorded statements by Arab leaders and commentators, Nasser above all, against the facts as the station presented them, on the reasoning that a recording of a leader's own voice was hard to deny. It ran twice a week with a repeat the following day, and three times a week after 1967, drawing on an archive of some 40,000 recordings. According to David Karon, an intelligence officer who interrogated Egyptian prisoners after the 1956 war, the idea came from a captured Egyptian officer who complained that the station lost credibility when its presenters tried to match the invective of Cairo's Voice of the Arabs, and argued that sticking to facts would serve it better.

The station also abandoned literary Arabic for colloquial dialects so as to reach listeners who could not read, with presenters assigned to the dialect of each target country, such as Salman Dabi ("Ibn al-Rafidayn") for Iraq. Its producers stopped using belittling terms for Arab governments and referred to Nasser by his title of president. Nasser responded to the station in his own speeches on several occasions; in 1959 Maariv reported that, having admitted he listened to Kol Yisrael regularly, he had begun arguing with it on air.

=== Intelligence use ===
According to the 2023 documentary Radio Propaganda, the broadcasts were also used to activate agents in Arab countries through codes embedded in the programming. In one documented case, the Mossad told Munir Redfa, the Iraqi pilot who defected to Israel with his MiG-21 on 16 August 1966 in Operation Diamond, that the operation was a go by having the song "Marhabtayn Marhabtayn" (مرحبتين مرحبتين, "Welcome twice over") played on the station as a prearranged signal.

=== Editorial policy and staffing ===
Unlike the Voice of America, Kol Yisrael was not a direct organ of the government, and the ''Monitor'' reported in 1984 that the Arabic service was generally left to decide its own content, with its hourly news bulletins free of any outside direction; the main exception came in wartime, when it carried military announcements. Its twice-daily political commentaries were presented explicitly as Israeli opinion. Because it also served hundreds of thousands of Arab listeners in Israel and the West Bank who had access to other news, Zehayek said the station aired items unfavourable to Israel, though he chose not to lead bulletins with them as the Hebrew service would; he described this as a form of self-censorship. At the time the service broadcast 18 hours a day and competed with some 52 other Arabic-language stations.

Daskal and Shwartz Altshuler, drawing on the media scholar Dan Caspi, write that the security establishment took part in vetting staff for the IBA's Arabic departments, that senior management posts were held by Jews, that Druze applicants were preferred over Christian Arabs and Christian Arabs over Muslims, and that the political and military correspondents' posts were filled only by Jews. A former staff member, Salim Shehadeh, told them that editors and presenters received no instructions from the army and that management did not censor the news, but that the station avoided terms usual in other Arab media, calling attackers "saboteurs" (mukharrib) where other stations said "gunmen" (musallah).

== Audience ==
While its signal still reached the Arab countries, contemporary reports described a large audience there and a reputation for reliability. In 1964 Davar reported that the Saudi newspaper Al-Bilad had quoted listeners who said Kol Yisrael exposed facts that Arab stations tried to hide, and that it covered news from the whole Arab world in a single bulletin while each Arab station focused on its own country. In 1984 Zehayek told the ''Monitor'' that he received about a hundred letters a day from Egypt since the peace treaty, and around a dozen more from many other countries through a post office box in Switzerland. Its core audience was in Syria, Egypt, Jordan, Iraq and Lebanon, along with hundreds of thousands of listeners in Israel and the West Bank. Its reach was such that during Anwar Sadat's 1977 visit to Jerusalem, Libyan diplomats in Beirut who were planning to burn a flag in protest followed its coverage to learn when his plane had landed.

The station's audience and credibility in its later decades are disputed. Zuheir Bahloul, formerly a senior figure in the IBA's Arabic broadcasting, held that it was regarded as credible until the 1990s, when Arab satellite channels offering news independent of governments undermined its standing; the former IBA director-general Yoni Ben-Menachem attributed the decline instead to the Arab world's move from radio to satellite television, and Zehayek to the dismantling of the main transmitter. Gross maintained that listening remained high even in the Palestinian territories, while Jamal argued that this had been true only in the past. According to the media scholar Mary Totry, Palestinian listeners drifted back to the station once the Palestinian Authority's own radio came to be seen as reflecting only the views of its leadership, and surveys on the eve of the Second Intifada found that most of the Palestinian public preferred Kol Yisrael in Arabic, although listeners returned to the Voice of Palestine at times of confrontation with Israel. In January 2011 the station's website crashed under the number of visitors from the Middle East seeking reliable information.

After its signal weakened, the station kept a following among Palestinians and in the wider Arab world. In a 2009 article in Al-Quds Al-Arabi the Palestinian writer Tawfiq Abu Shomar described a media course in which his trainees monitored its output. He credited its popularity to bulletins timed for different audiences through the day and ordered by importance rather than opening with the head of state, to headlines that held listeners through the whole bulletin, and to weather forecasts he considered more reliable than those of Arab stations; he also observed that it aired rumours as news and used its headlines as a "trap" for listeners.

Among Arab citizens of Israel, Daskal and Shwartz Altshuler describe an ambivalent relationship: many regarded the station as an official mouthpiece, some calling it a "mista'arev radio" or believing that the security services shaped its content, yet it remained a source of information about events in Israel.

== In film ==
The 2023 documentary Radio Propaganda (Hebrew: HaTizmoret, "The Orchestra"), directed by Ofer Pinchasov and screened at Docaviv that year, tells the story of the station and its staff. It presents the station as an instrument of propaganda and psychological warfare and as a channel for activating agents, and recalls that rival Arab stations mocked its broadcasters as a "propaganda orchestra".

== See also ==
- The Farsi section of Israel Radio
- Voice of the Arabs

== Sources ==
- Menashe, Shaul; Marom, Dani (March 2022). ""Sheqarim ve-uvdot": Tokhnit ha-lohama ha-psikhologit shel Beit ha-Shidur ha-Yisraeli, helek alef" ["Lies and Facts": the psychological warfare programme of the Israeli Broadcasting House, part 1] (PDF). Mabat Malam (in Hebrew) (91): 29–31.
- Daskal, Shlomo; Shwartz Altshuler, Tehilla (2015). Taḥanat ha-radyo A-Shams: Ba-tefer she-bein regulatzya, politika ve-kalkala [A-Shams: The Challenges of an Arabic Radio Station in Israel] (PDF) (in Hebrew). Jerusalem: Israel Democracy Institute. ISBN 978-965-519-173-8.
