= Galatz =

Galatz may refer to:

- Alternative spelling for Galați, a town in Romania
- Galil Tzalafim (Hebrew: גל"צ), a sniper version of the Israeli IMI Galil assault rifle
- Galey Tzahal (גל"צ), an abbreviation of the Israel Army Radio network
- Galgalatz (גלגל"צ)
