= Kan 88 =

- Kan 88 logo since 2017
- Israel
- Frequencies: 87.6 FM; 88.0 FM; 88.5 FM; 88.2 FM

Programming
- Language: Hebrew
- Format: Public

Ownership
- Owner: Israeli Public Broadcasting Corporation

History
- First air date: 15 May 2017

Links
- Website: www.kan.org.il/content/kan/kan-88/

Kan 88 (Hebrew: כאן 88) is an Israeli radio station that began broadcasting on 15 May 2017, as part of the Israeli Broadcasting Corporation, known as "Kan" (כאן, lit. 'here'). The station was established to replace Kol Israel's 88FM, previously owned by the Israel Broadcasting Authority. Kan 88 offers a diverse range of radio programs, featuring classic rock, alternative music, jazz, world music, blues, and a selection of both new and established indie artists.

In 2019, the station achieved a national exposure rate of 10.8%, as reported by Kantar Group's Target Group Index (TGI) survey.

== History ==
Kan 88 commenced broadcasting on 15 May 2017, coinciding with the launch of the Israel Broadcasting Corporation. The station is based in Jerusalem, but it was previously operated from Tel Aviv.

The station offers a variety of regular daily programs. Throughout the day, it features new songs selected from the "Editors' Choices" list. This list, curated by the editorial team of Kan 88, is updated weekly and made available on the station's website.

== Controversy ==
The editorial powers of broadcasters at 88FM, were set to be removed for those who will continue working at the new "Kan 88" station, limiting their roles to that of mere presenters. Many critics argued that the uniqueness of 88FM lied in its extensive freedom granted to its various editors.

The new Kan 88 radio station has faced criticism for its perceived lack of effective communication as well. Some listeners expressed the opinion that Kan 88 bears a resemblance to Galgalatz, which they believe has led to a diminished uniqueness in its programming.

== See also ==
- Israeli Public Broadcasting Corporation
