= Menashe Amir =

Israeli journalist and radio personality

- מנשה אמיר
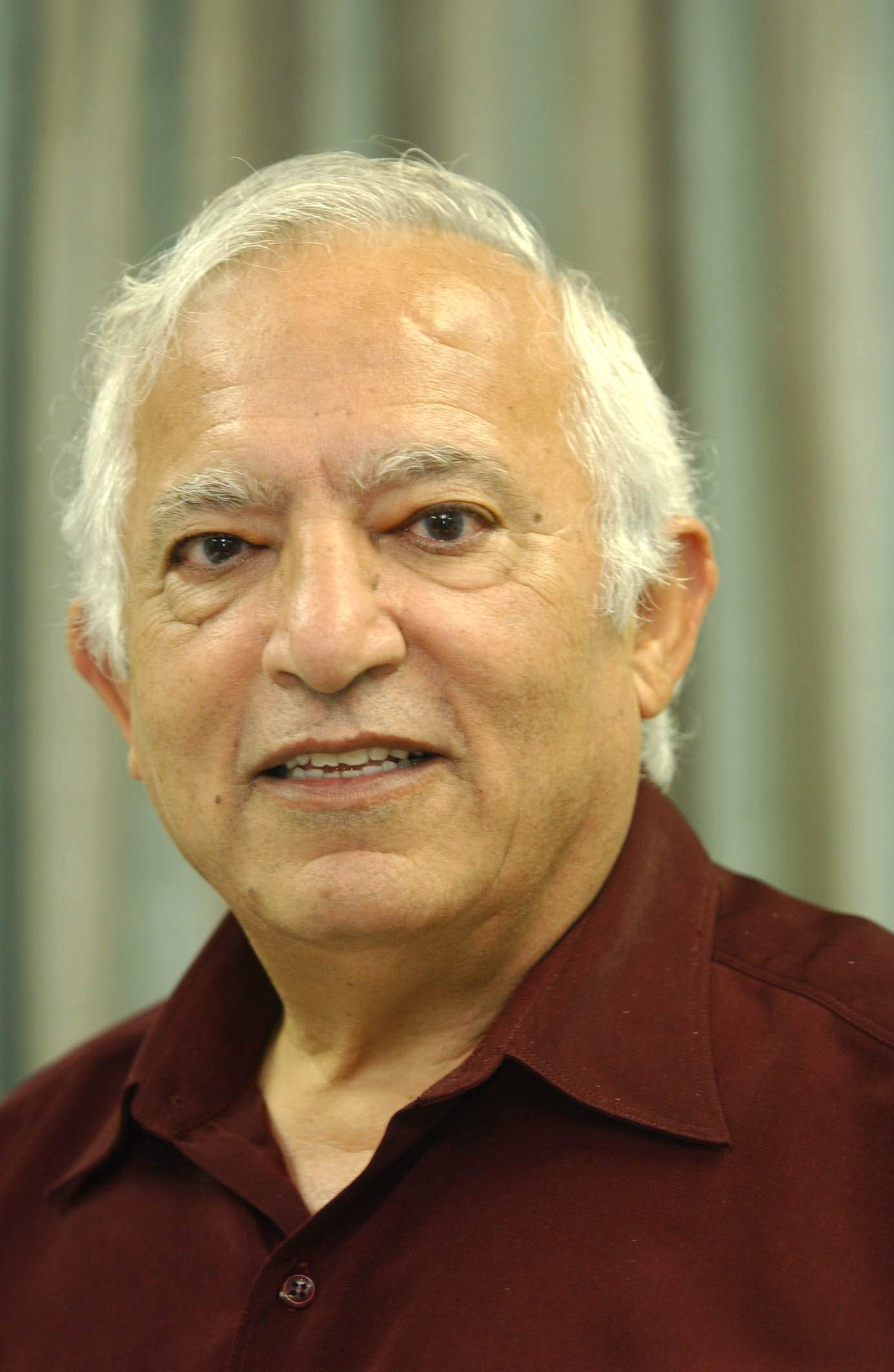
- Amir in 2011
- Born: Manouchehr Sachmehchi (منوچهر ساچمه‌چی); December 27, 1939 (age 86); Tehran, Imperial State of Iran

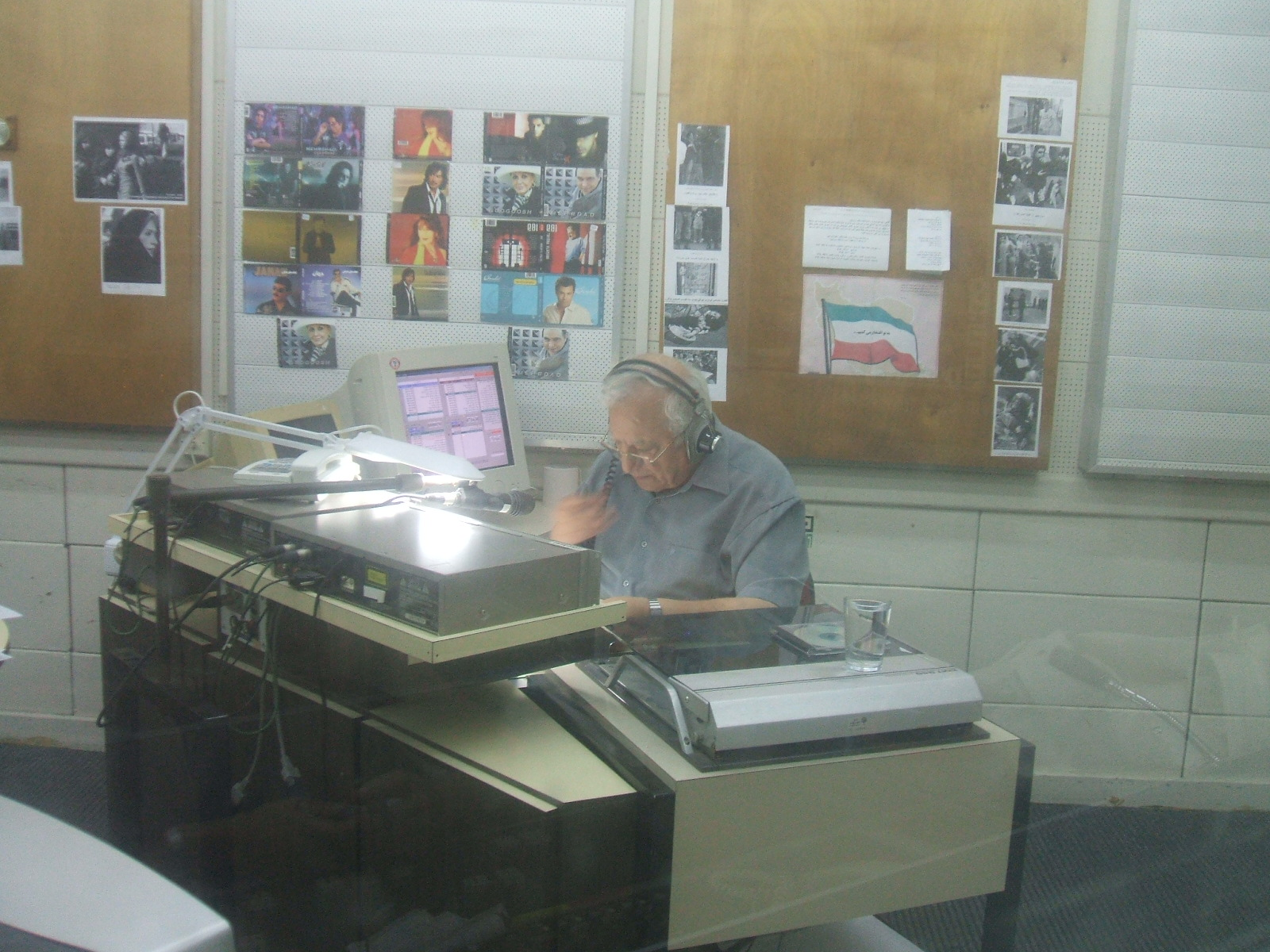
Menashe Amir at the studio of Kol Yisrael Persian service, 2009

Menashe Amir (Hebrew: מנשה אמיר; born 27 December 1939) is a long time Persian language broadcaster on Israel Radio International, a channel of Kol Yisrael (lit. "Voice of Israel"). He is a former head of the Israel Broadcasting Authority's Persian language division. He is a former chief editor of the Foreign Ministry's Persian website.

== Biography ==
Menashe Amir was born Manouchehr Sachmehchi (Persian: منوچهر ساچمه‌چی) in Tehran, Iran, on December 27, 1939 in a secular Jewish family. His primary education was in a Christian missionary school called "Nour-va-Sedāghat", and he continued his secondary education in two Jewish schools named "Ettehād" (Alliance/Unity) and "Kourosh" (Cyrus). He began his journalist's profession at the age of 17, at the Kayhan evening newspaper. Amir made aliyah (immigration) to Israel on October 19, 1959.

== Journalism and radio career ==
He has been working as a journalist and a broadcaster for over 65 years, and broadcasting to Iran for over 62 years. Amir became popular in Israel during his coverage of the 1979 Iran hostage crisis. In 2006, he founded the Persian version of the Israeli Foreign Ministry website, and served as its Chief Editor for 4 years. Currently retired from his post in the Israel Broadcasting Authority, he continues to host his radio program.

Amir hosted a daily 1.5 hour radio program in Persian, which was broadcast every evening to Iran on shortwave radio. The program included a call-in portion, with Iranian listeners calling a special number in Germany. While no hard data is available the show was apparently popular in Iran, and some experts estimated in 2003 that up to 5 million Iranians listen to it. Beside political discussions, the program also broadcasts music banned in Iran. Iranian newspapers often denounce the radio as the "Zionist regime radio", and refute the radio program assertions.

In the aftermath of the 2009 Iranian presidential election, the Supreme Leader Ayatollah Ali Khamenei blamed the "Zionist radio and the bad British radio" for misleading the public. This was widely interpreted as a reference to Menashe Amir's program on Kol Yisrael and a reference to BBC Persian.

== Published works ==
"Iran, Jews, Israel", a collection of interviews with Amnon Netzer, an Israeli expert in Iranian Studies, was published in Persian in 2014.

== See also ==
- Israeli journalism
