= 88.2 FM =

FM radio frequency

The following radio stations broadcast on FM frequency 88.2 MHz:

== China ==
- CNR The Voice of China in Panjin

== Israel ==
- Kan 88 in Arabah, Jerusalem, the Judea and Samaria Area, Nazareth and Safed

== Malaysia ==
- Hot FM in Alor Setar, Kedah and Penang

== New Zealand ==
- Various low-power stations up to 1 watt

== Turkey ==
- TRT-3 at Istanbul

== United Kingdom ==
- BBC Radio 2 (Betws Y Coed, Bexhill, Calne, Elgin, Gloucestershire, Newbury, South West Wales)
