= Palestine Broadcasting Service =

State-owned radio station from 1936 to 1948

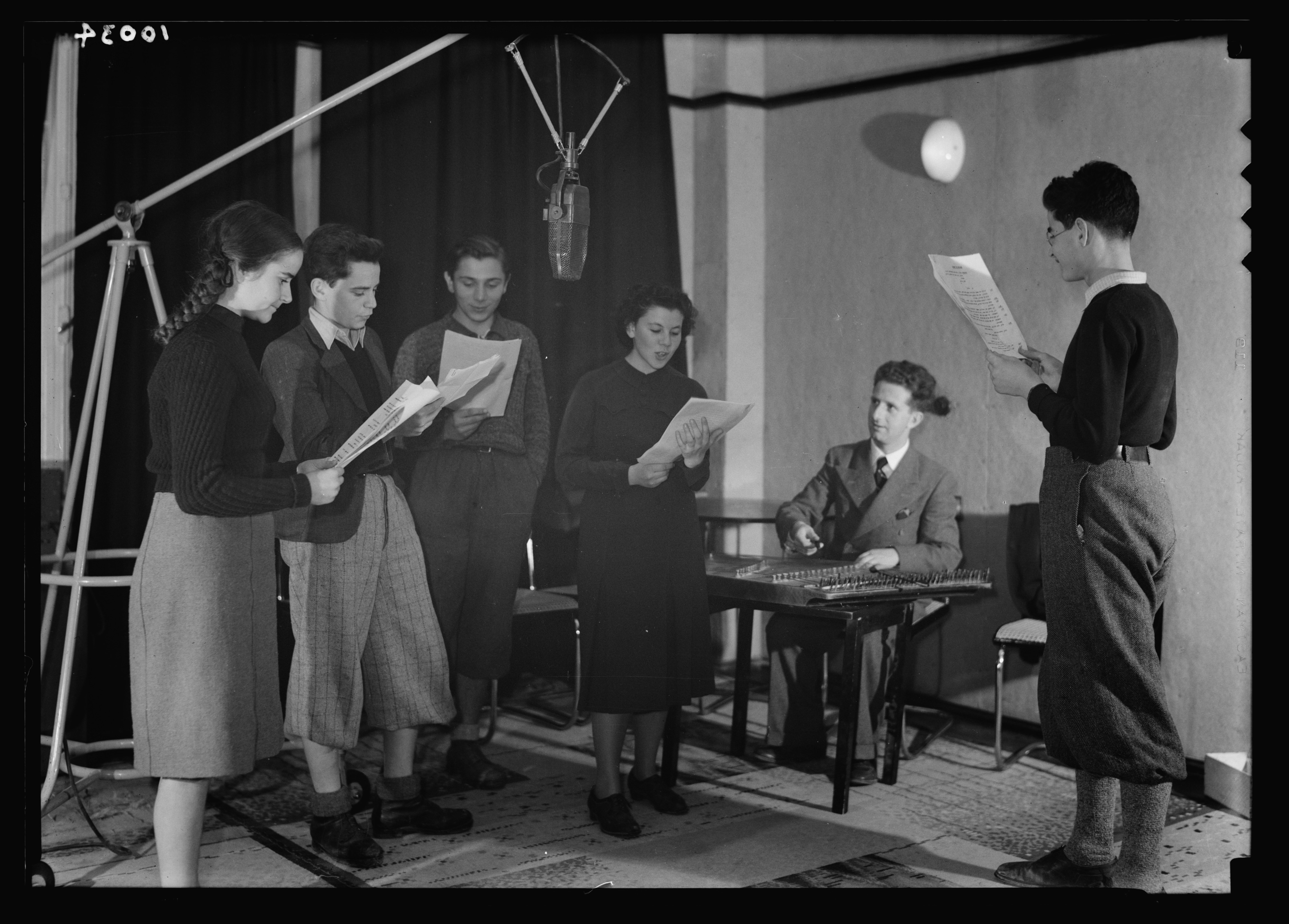
PBS broadcasting Hebrew children's hour, 1934

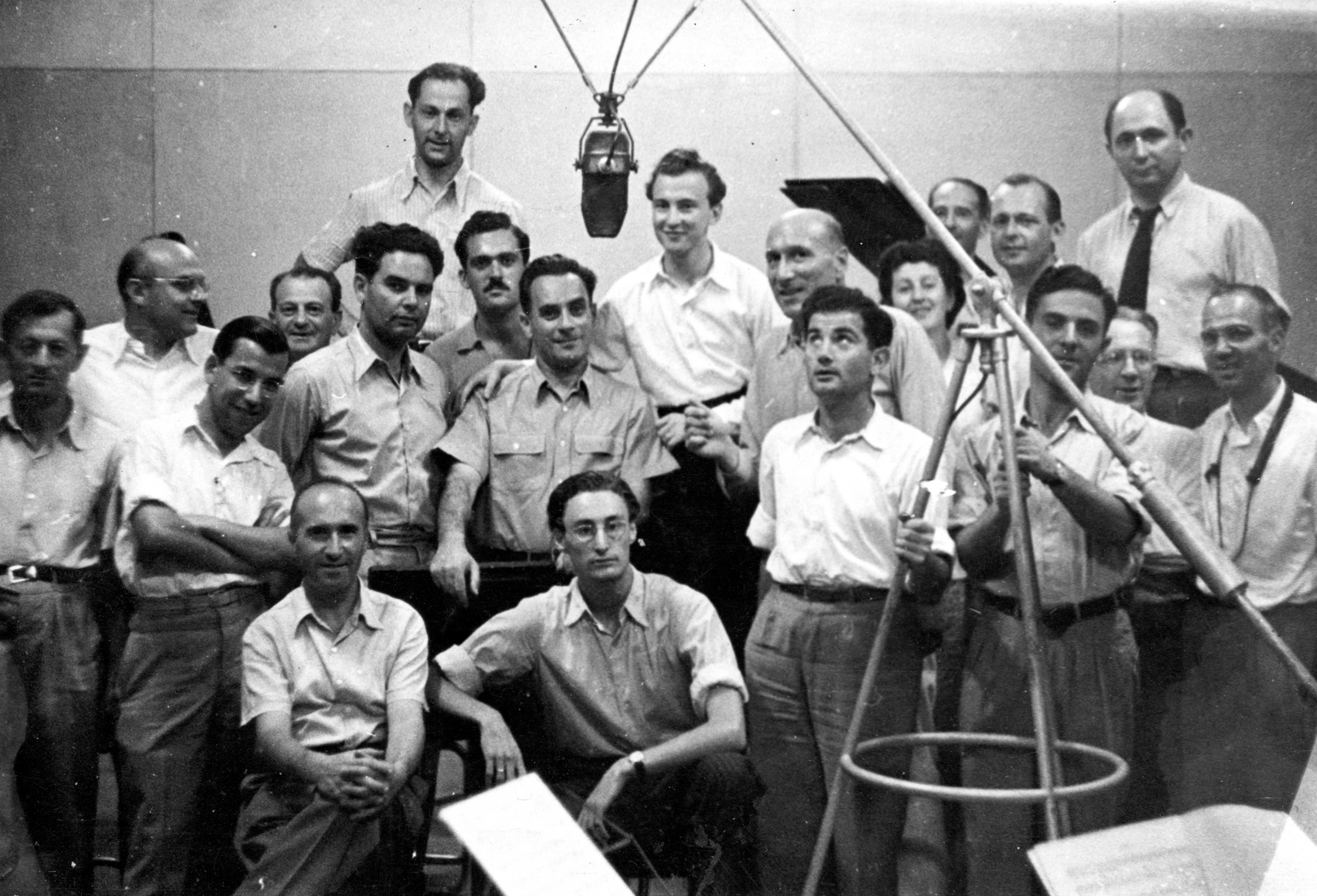
Broadcast from PBS studio in Jerusalem, Menahem Pressler's performance of Schumann's Piano Concerto, July 1947

The Palestine Broadcasting Service (PBS) was the state-owned radio broadcasting station that operated from Jerusalem, Mandatory Palestine (now Israel and Palestinian territories) with the main transmitter in Ramallah.

== History ==
The service operated from March 1936 until the end of the British Mandate of Palestine in 1948. It broadcast programs in Arabic, Hebrew, and English, with broadcasting time allotted in that order.

Its Hebrew service, Kol Yerushalayim, which was inaugurated on March 30, 1936, played an important role in the emergence of Hebrew as a national language.

While news broadcasts and political commentary were heavily censored, PBS programs such as live music broadcasts were important in the development of cultural and national identity.

== See also ==
- History of Palestinian journalism
