= Reka (radio station) =

International broadcasting service of Israel

- Type: Radio network
- Country: Israel

Ownership
- Owner: Israel Broadcasting Authority

History
- Launch date: 1950; 76 years ago
- Closed: 2017; 9 years ago
- Replaced by: Kan Reka
- Former names: Kol Zion la'Gola

Coverage
- Availability: International

Reka, also known as Israel Radio International, (Hebrew: רשת קליטת עלייה Reshet Klitat Aliya) was the radio service of the Israel Broadcasting Authority for immigrants and listeners abroad. It was succeeded in 2017 by the Israeli Public Broadcasting Corporation's Kan Reka.

== Overview ==
Operating since 1950, the shortwave transmissions of Kol Israel ("Voice of Israel") on Reshet Hey ("Network E") broadcasts to the entire world. They are also the main link between Israel and the Jewish diaspora. In its early years, under the name "Kol Zion la'Gola" ('Voice of Zion to the Diaspora), Israeli broadcasts were the sole reliable and direct source of information for Jews living in the Arab countries and behind the "Iron Curtain". However, broadcasts to Europe, Asia, Africa, and Latin America also emerged as an important aspect of Israel's public diplomacy around the world.

Apart from news and broadcasts reflecting events in the country, the channel transmits documentaries on Judaism, the history of the Israeli people, Israeli culture and discussions on immigration and absorption.

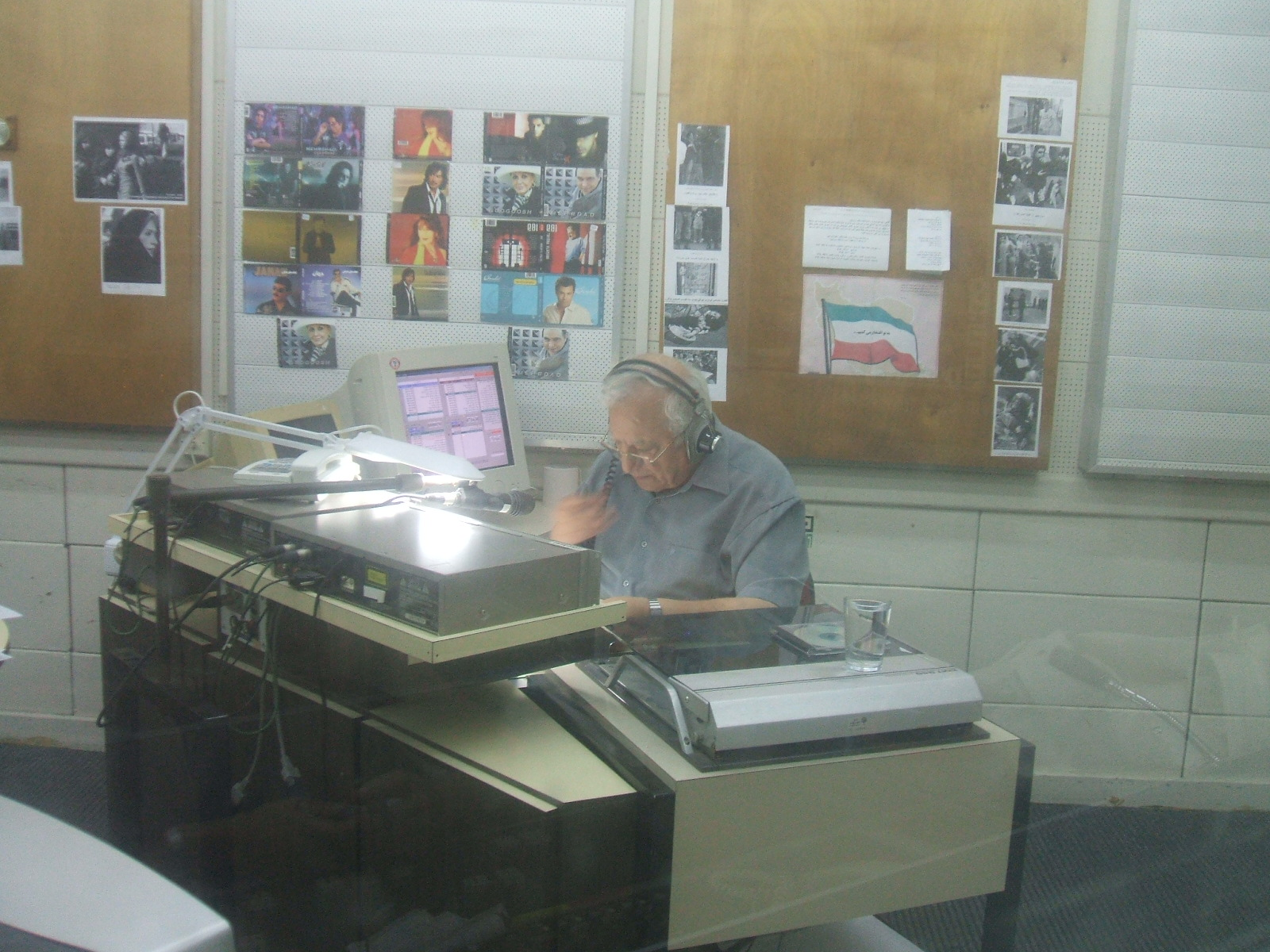
The studio of Israel Radio's Persian service

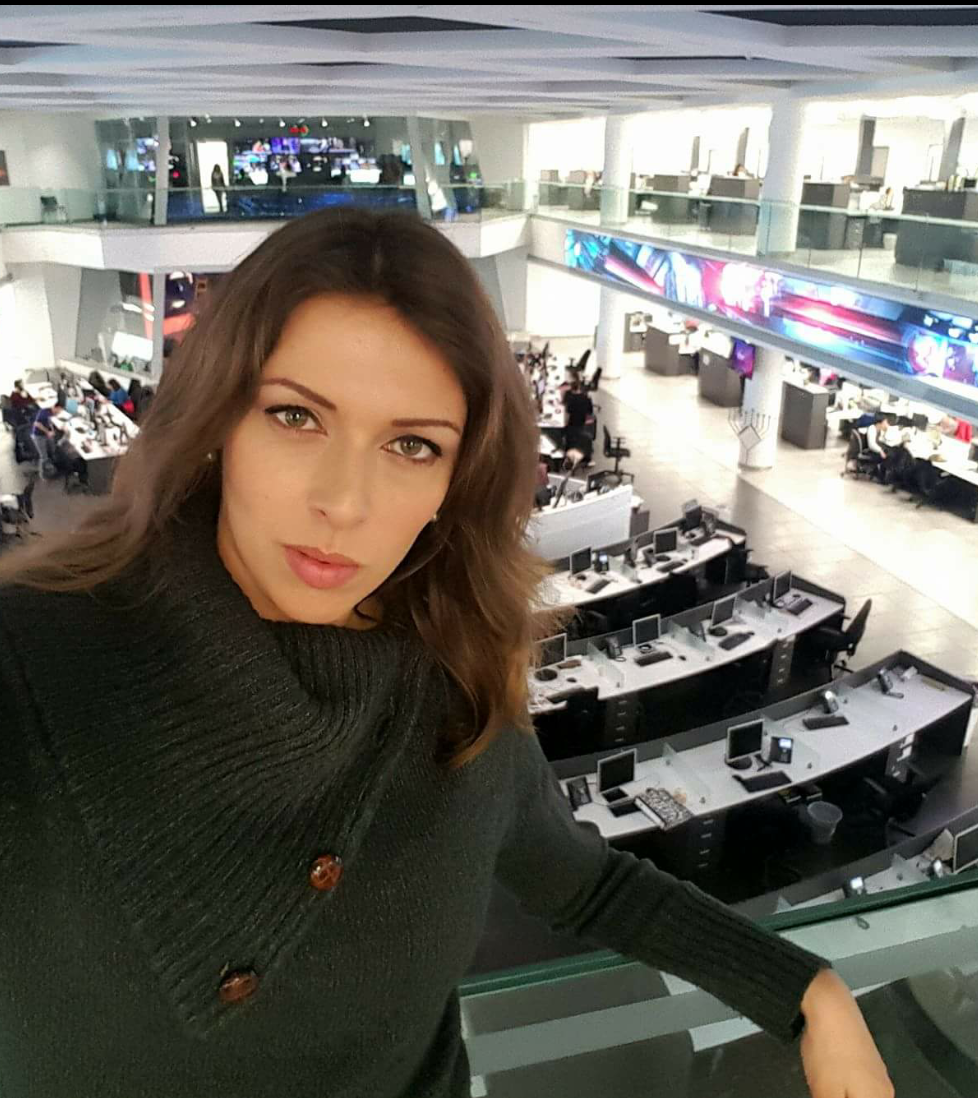
Russian service presenter, Noa Lavie

As of the summer of 2007, the only Israel Radio International / Reshet Hey produced programming, is Persian. The rest of Israel Radio International, is a relay of the domestic Reka network. For example, the English news broadcasts on Reka and Israel Radio International are now identical.

As of 30 June 2013, due to budget cuts, the Persian service is no longer on shortwave. The Persian service is still available via satellite and on the web at the IBA World website, as well as the radis.org website.

As of 1 April 2008, the only shortwave broadcasts which were left were 1.5 hours of Persian aimed at Iran. The Persian Service was founded by Amnon Netzer in 1958.

The Israel Radio English news may be heard on some radio stations which use the WRN feed. These stations do not broadcast at the same schedule as Israel Radio does, they are time delayed by WRN.

As of 25 April 2013, WRN is no longer carried on Sirius/XM. WRMI has said that they may add WRN programming back to their schedule in the future. As of 16 December 2013, WRN no longer hosts on-demand audio and podcasts. Reka remained still available on WRN's English stream.

== See also ==
- Culture of Israel
- IBA News
- Israel Broadcasting Authority
- Kol Yerushalayim, the Hebrew program of Jerusalem Calling, the radio station of the British Mandatory Authority
- Kol Yisrael, Israel's public domestic and international radio service.
- Menashe Amir
- Media of Israel
