= Kol BaRama =

Radio station in Israel

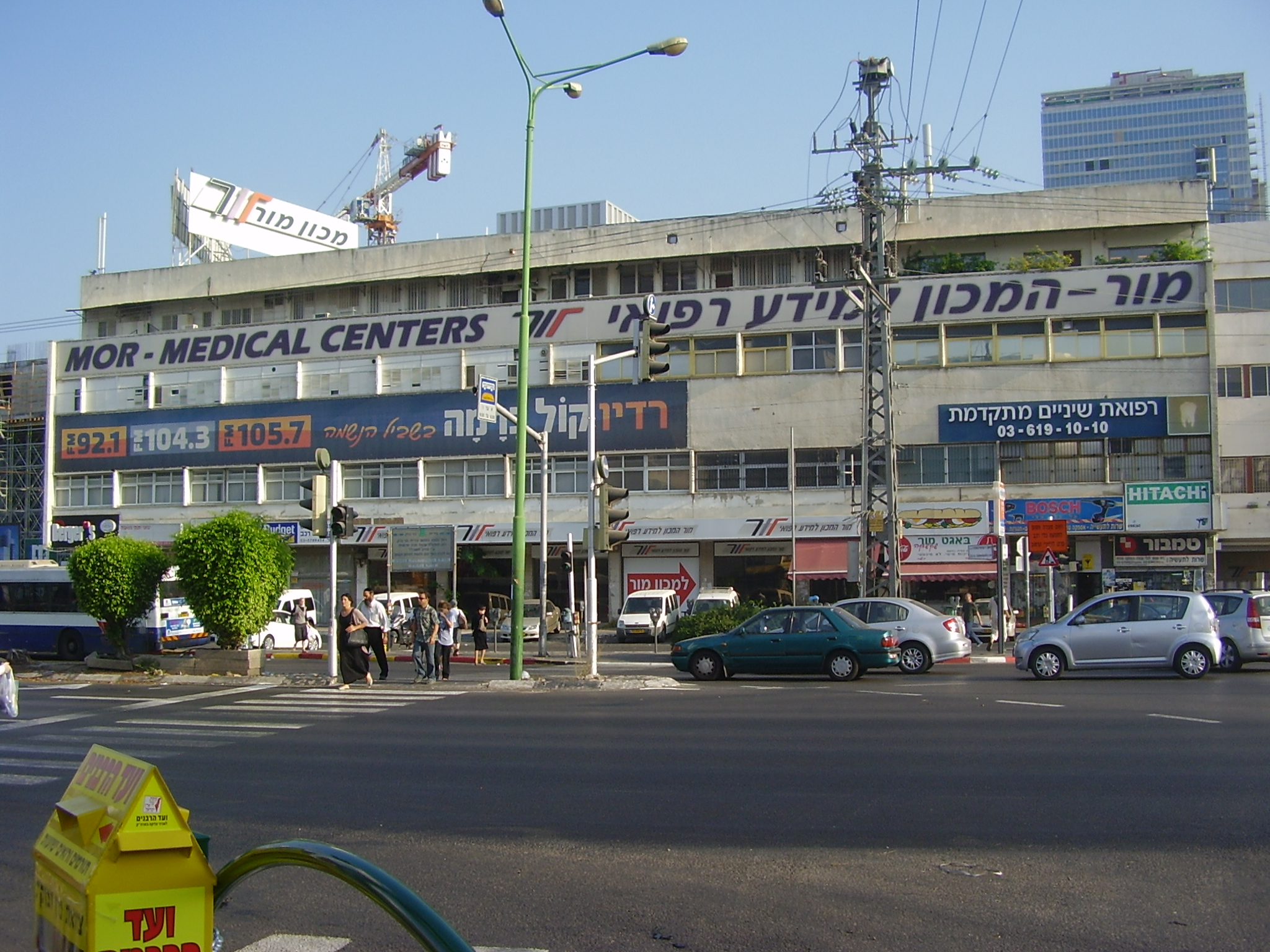
Kol BaRama headquarters in Bnei Brak

Kol BaRama (Hebrew: רדיו קול ברמה) is a Haredi Israeli radio station established in 2009. The station, based in Bnei Brak, does not broadcast on Shabbat (from sunset Friday afternoon until nightfall Saturday night).

== Frequencies ==
Frequency	Region
92.1 FM	Central area
105.7 FM	Jerusalem
104.3 FM	South

== Political identification ==
The station is now closely identified with Aryeh Deri's Shas party. From 2005 until 2010 the party supported Shas' rival Eli Yishay.

== COVID-19 broadcasts ==
During the 2020 COVID-19 pandemic, when all synagogues in Israel were closed, the station received permission to broadcast daily prayers with a minyan 3 times a day.
