= Jerusalem Calling =

Jerusalem Calling was the radio station established by the British Mandatory Authority through its broadcasting wing, the Palestine Broadcasting Service. It broadcast in three languages, Arabic, English and Hebrew.

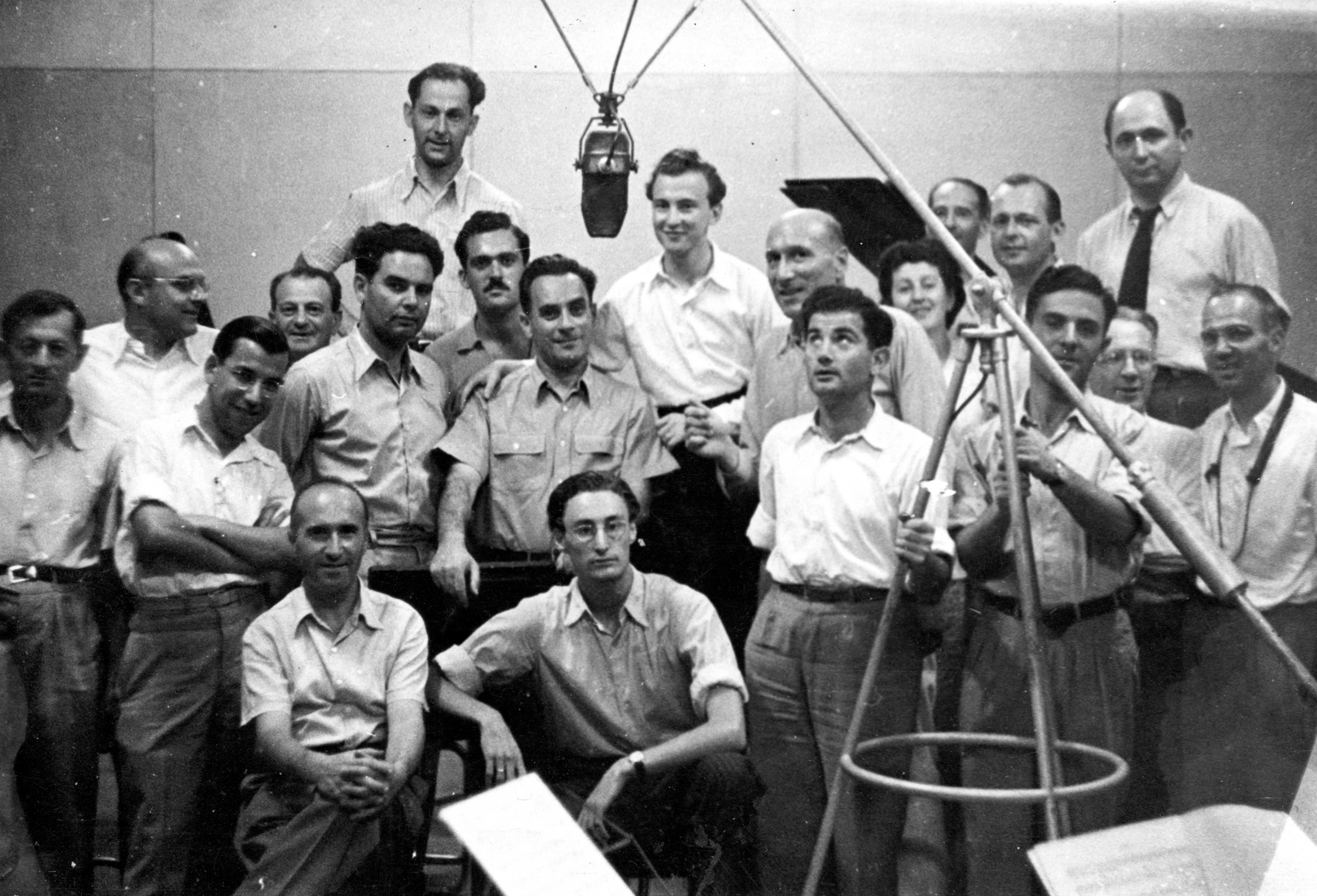
Photo taken at the Palestine Broadcasting Service studio in Jerusalem, July 1947, after the performance of Piano Concerto (Schumann). Menahem Pressler stands to the right of microphone.

The English broadcasts were under the name Jerusalem Calling. The Hebrew language transmissions were under the name Kol Yerushalayim i.e. The Voice of Jerusalem (in Hebrew קול ירושלים), whereas the Arabic language broadcasts of the station used the name Iza'at al Quds i.e. Radio al Quds (in Arabic إذاعة القدس).

== Establishment ==
On March 30, 1936, the Palestine Broadcasting Service began radio transmissions from Ramallah. Staff were recruited for five hours of daily broadcasts in three languages, English, Arabic, and Hebrew and training given by the BBC.

The Hebrew language transmissions were eventually called Kol Yerushalayim (The Voice of Jerusalem) after arguments with Arab leaders following the Jews original intention to call them 'Kol Eretz Israel' (The Voice of the Land of Israel). Transmissions in Hebrew were limited to one hour per day.

The Arabic languages broadcasts continued as Radio Al Quds (in Arabic إذاعة القدس).

== Split ==
In 1942, the transmissions were split into two stations – for English/Arabic (Radio al Quds) and English/Hebrew (Kol Yerushalayim).

The original channel transmitted on 668 kc/s kHz (449 meters with a power of 20 kW). The second channel (PBS2) transmitted on 574 kHz (522 meters at 20 kW).

The first channel, PBS 1, was moved slightly to 677 kHz (443 meters), which allowed it to be heard better in Europe.

== Changes ==
- in 1950, two years after the establishment of the State of Israel, Kol Yerushalayim merged with Kol Yisrael, that became the country's official radio station.
- The Palestinian West Bank authorities (part of the Jordanian administration that took over the West Bank after 1948) continued broadcasting the station in Arabic and English using the name Al Quds Arabic Radio (in Arabic إذاعة القدس العربية) with studios in Ramallah. It continued from 1948 until 1967 when it ceased broadcasting after the Six-Day War of 1967 and the occupation by Israel of the West Bank.

== See also ==
- Israel Broadcasting Authority
- Israel Radio International, the official radio service for immigrants and for listeners outside Israel
- Kol Yisrael, Israel's public domestic and international radio service.
- Voice of Palestine, a subsidiary of the Palestinian Broadcasting Corporation, Palestinian Authorities' domestic and international radio service.
- The Farsi section of Israel Radio
