= Radio Makan =

Arabic-language radio station in Israel

- Israel
- Frequencies: 88.8 FM; 92.3 FM; 93.7 FM; 99.3 FM

Programming
- Language: Arabic

Ownership
- Owner: Israeli Public Broadcasting Corporation

History
- First air date: 15 May 2017

Links
- Website: www.makan.org.il/content/makan/mradio/

Radio Makan (Arabic: راديو مكان) is an Arabic-language radio station in Israel operated by the Israeli Public Broadcasting Corporation. The station broadcasts in Arabic and focuses on news and cultural content. It replaced Kol Yisrael in Arabic and began its broadcasts on 15 May 2017. The station's broadcasts are also aired daily on channel Makan 33.

The studios of Radio Makan are located in the Broadcasting Corporation building in Jerusalem and in the basement of the Tower of the Prophets in Haifa.

The word "makan" means "place" in Arabic.

According to surveys conducted by the Government Advertising Bureau, Radio Makan is the second most listened-to station among Israeli Arabs after Ashams Radio as of the early 2020s.
