= Kol Yisrael =

Domestic and international radio service of Israel

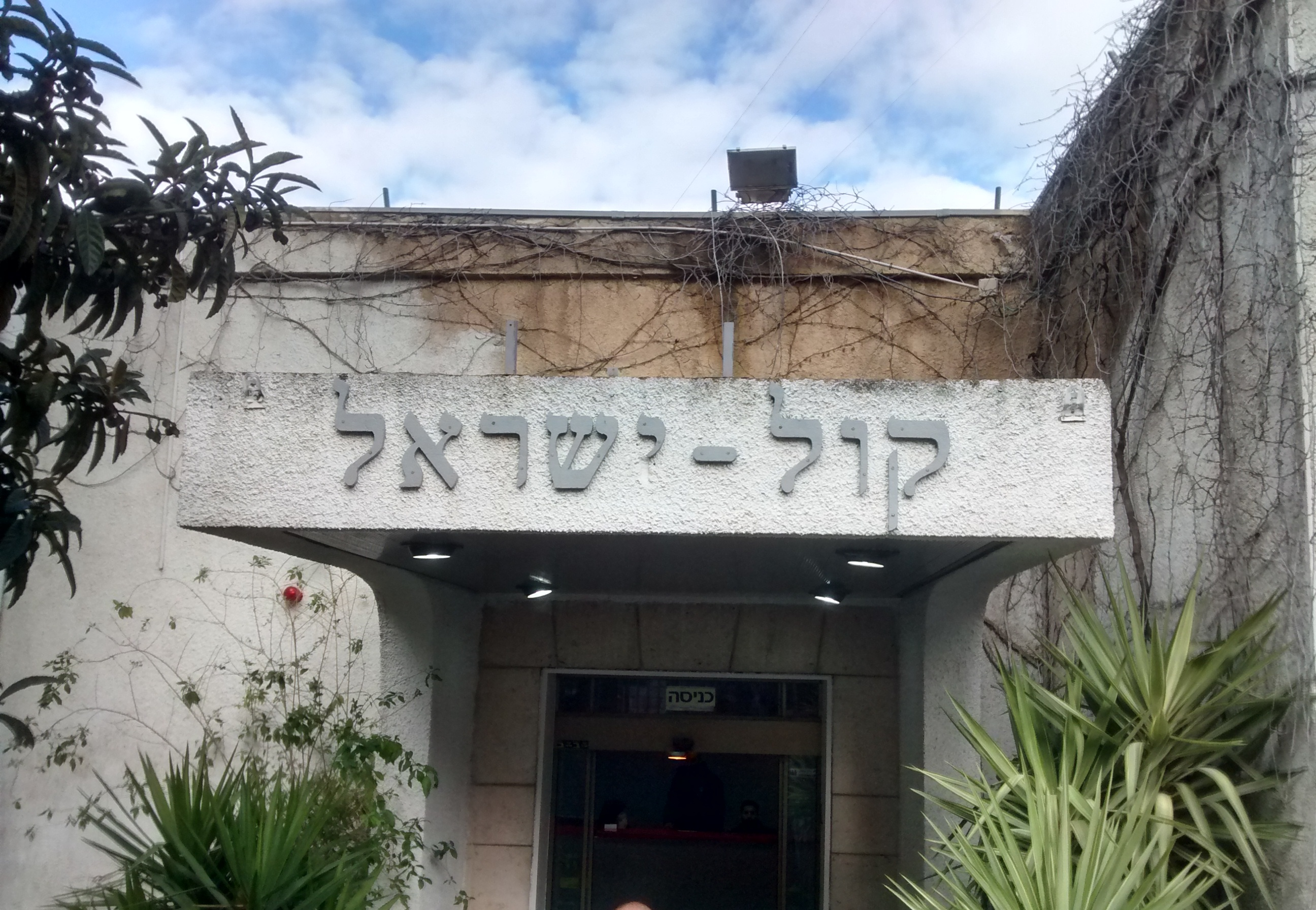
- Entrance to Kol Yisrael facilities in Romema, Jerusalem (2016)
- Type: Public-service sound broadcasting
- Country: Israel
- Broadcast area: National; International

Programming
- Language(s): Hebrew, English, French, Persian, Bukhori, Yiddish, Spanish, Maghrebi Arabic, Georgian, Amharic, Tigrinya, Ladino, Hungarian, Romanian, and Russian

Ownership
- Owner: Israel Broadcasting Authority (1965–2017); Israeli Public Broadcasting Corporation (2017–)

History
- Launch date: December 1947; 78 years ago
- Closed: May 2017; 9 years ago
- Former names: Telem-Shamir-Boaz; Kol HaHagana; Shidurei Yisrael

Coverage
- Stations: See list below

Links
- Webcast: List of streams
- Website: www.kan.org.il

Kol Yisrael or Kol Israel (קול ישראל, lit. "Voice of Israel"; also Israel Radio) was Israel's public domestic and international radio service. It operated as a division of the Israel Broadcasting Service from 1951 to 1965, and later the Israel Broadcasting Authority (IBA) from 1965 to 2017. Following the IBA's closure, the radio stations it used to administer are currently operated by the Israeli Public Broadcasting Corporation.

== History ==
Kol Yisrael was originally an underground Haganah radio station that broadcast from Tel Aviv. It started consistently broadcasting in December 1947 under the name Telem-Shamir-Boaz, and was renamed to Kol HaHagana ("Voice of the Haganah") in March 1948. With Israel's declaration of independence on 14 May 1948, it was transformed into the official station Kol Yisrael. Another station named Kol Yisrael operated in Haifa, and was renamed Kol Tzva HaHagana ("Voice of the Defense Force").

The first Kol Yisrael transmission was a live broadcast from Tel Aviv of David Ben-Gurion reading the declaration of independence. It was operated by a department of the Ministry of the Interior responsible for domestic and international broadcasts. Responsibility for the service was later transferred to the Office of Posts and Telegraphs and then to the Prime Minister's Office.

The station inherited the facilities of the former Palestine Broadcasting Service, which had been founded as the official broadcaster of the Mandate of Palestine in 1936, and had run the Kol Yerushalayim radio station. Kol Yisrael staff was made up of both former PBS personnel and former staffers at the Haganah underground radio stations.

Kol Yisrael pioneered the use of FM transmission. In the early years, stations were operated in Jerusalem, Tel Aviv, and Haifa. The PBS had had its transmitter in Ramallah, but this transmitter was lost to Kol Yisrael due to Ramallah being in the Arab sector.

In March 1950, international broadcasting began under the name Kol Zion La Golah ("The Voice of Zion to the Diaspora.") The broadcasts were produced at Kol Yisrael by the World Zionist Organization in cooperation with the Jewish Agency, and aimed to foster communication between the Israeli state and the Jewish diaspora. The service broadcast readings from the Torah alongside documentary programs on life in Israel. In 1958, the international service was merged with the domestic broadcaster, with both services operating under the Kol Yisrael name.

Between 1958 and 1965, the "Kol Yisrael" international services expanded rapidly, inaugurating new shortwave services in Afrikaans, English, French, Hungarian, Italian, Persian, Romanian, and Yiddish. Between 1960 and 1963, the service also broadcast daily programs in English, French and Swahili for African audiences and began distributing tapes for rebroadcasting across the continent. This appeal to international audiences was closely tied to Israel's Periphery doctrine, which sought to align Israel with states on the fringes of the Middle East to avoid 'encirclement' by the Arab states and counteract international support for Palestinian nationalism. Programs on the international services ranged from news and commentary programs to competitions, documentaries and readings from the Bible and Quran. However, the technical quality of the international services was often poor beyond Israel's immediate neighbors in the Middle East.

In 1965, the Israel Broadcasting Authority, an independent public entity, was created and took over responsibility for Kol Yisrael from the Prime Minister's Office. In 1973, the IBA adopted the name Shidurei Yisrael ("Israel Broadcasting") for the service's domestic radio and television services. The name Kol Yisrael was revived for the domestic and international radio service in 1979.

Kol Yisrael's shortwave services were gradually discontinued over time. The last remaining shortwave service, the Persian programme for Iran, ceased transmissions on 30 June 2013. However, Israel continued to broadcast international services in fourteen languages under the label of Israel Radio International until 2017 when it was replaced by Kan Reka; the current service does not broadcast on shortwave.

== Name: meaning and significance ==
A previous station named Kol Yisrael had briefly been operated by the Haganah in 1940 on the 42-meter band. However, the station was soon renamed when the Haganah decided that the Kol Yisrael name should be reserved until independence.

Besides meaning "voice of Israel", Kol Yisrael is also a wordplay which in Hebrew sounds like the phrase "all of Israel" (although spelled differently), known to many Jews as part of the Talmudic expression כל ישראל ערבים זה בזה (kol Yisra'el arevim ze ba'ze, roughly translated "all of Israel are responsible for one another").

An internet radio station was launched in 2014 and operated through 2015 under the name of "Voice of Israel". This station is not connected to the official Kol Yisrael run by Israel Radio International.

== Broadcast channels ==
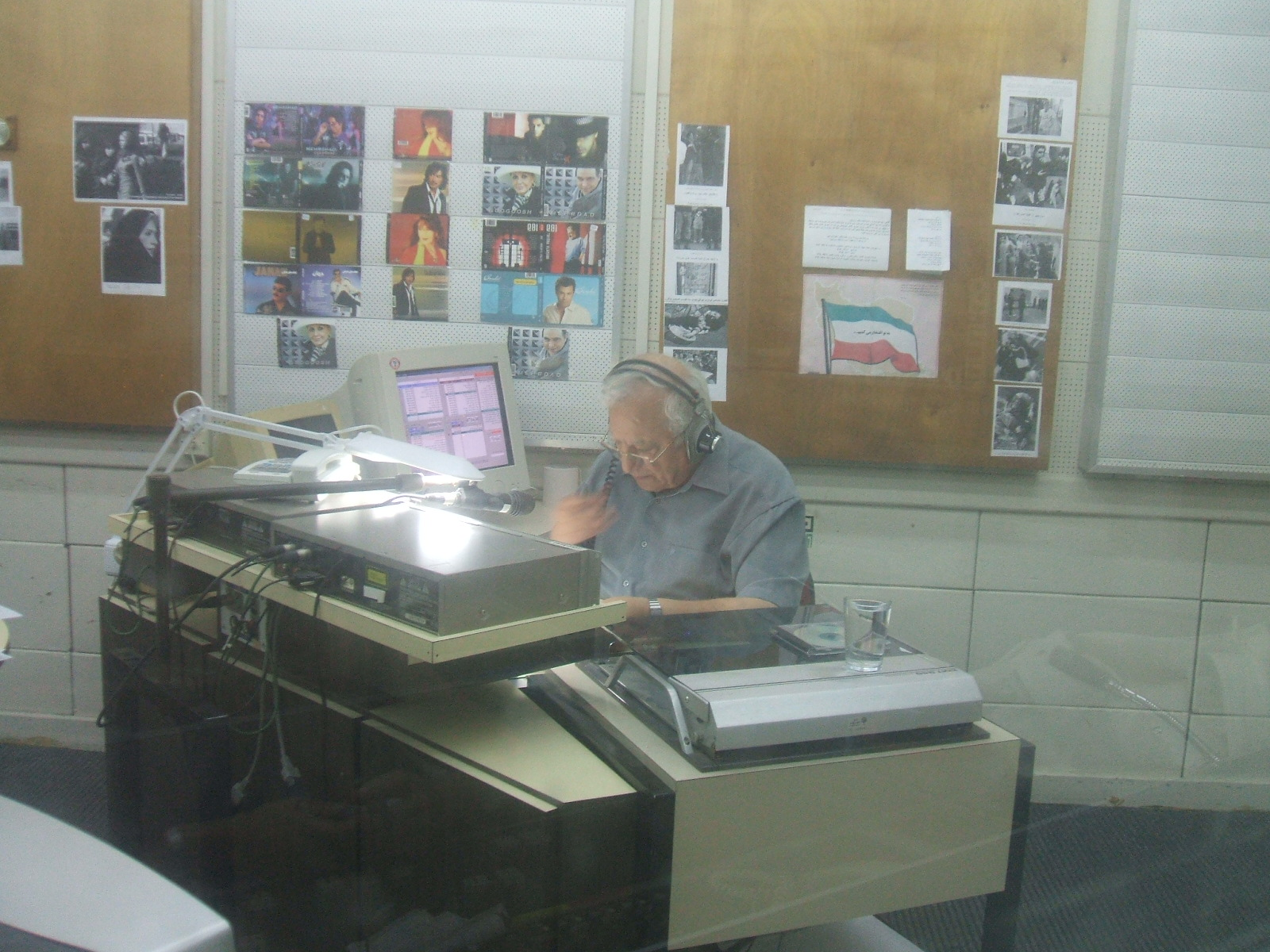
Israel Radio Persian-language broadcasting

Current Kol Yisrael channels include:

- Kan Tarbut ("The Culture Network"), also referred to as Kol Yisrael – General talk and cultural programming.
- Kan Bet ("Network B") – Popular radio station with news and current affairs programming, as well as sports coverage. There are news bulletins on the hour in Hebrew.
- Kan Gimel ("Network C") – Radio station devoted for promoting Israeli music. There are news bulletins in Hebrew at the same times as Kan Bet.
- Makan ("Network D") – Arabic-language radio station also known as Sawt Isra'eel (in Arabic: صوت إسرائيل, lit. 'Voice of Israel')
- Kan REKA (Acronym of REshet Klitat Aliya" - lit. "Immigrant absorption network") – Radio for olim (immigrants) to Israel. Broadcasts in 14 languages, including English at 0430, 1030, 1830 UTC (+1 hr during the Summer).
- Israel Radio International – International broadcasts in 14 languages: English, French, Persian, Bukhori, Yiddish, Spanish, Maghrebi Arabic, Georgian, Amharic, Tigrinya, Ladino, Hungarian, Romanian, and Russian. The international services are currently only available via online streaming and rebroadcasts through the domestic REKA network.
- Kan 88 – "High Quality" music (their terminology). Jazz, blues, electronic music and more, plus traffic news
- Kan Kol Ha Musica ("The Voice of Music") – Classical music and drama.
- Kan Moreshet ("The Heritage Network") – Religious broadcasting on Kan Tarbut's network.

There are also educational stations broadcasting via low-power transmitters from colleges and universities across Israel under the collective banner of Tachana Chinuchit.

All of Kol Israel's stations are available worldwide through streaming audio over the Internet. Live broadcasts as well as archived programs are available to listeners.

== Gallery ==
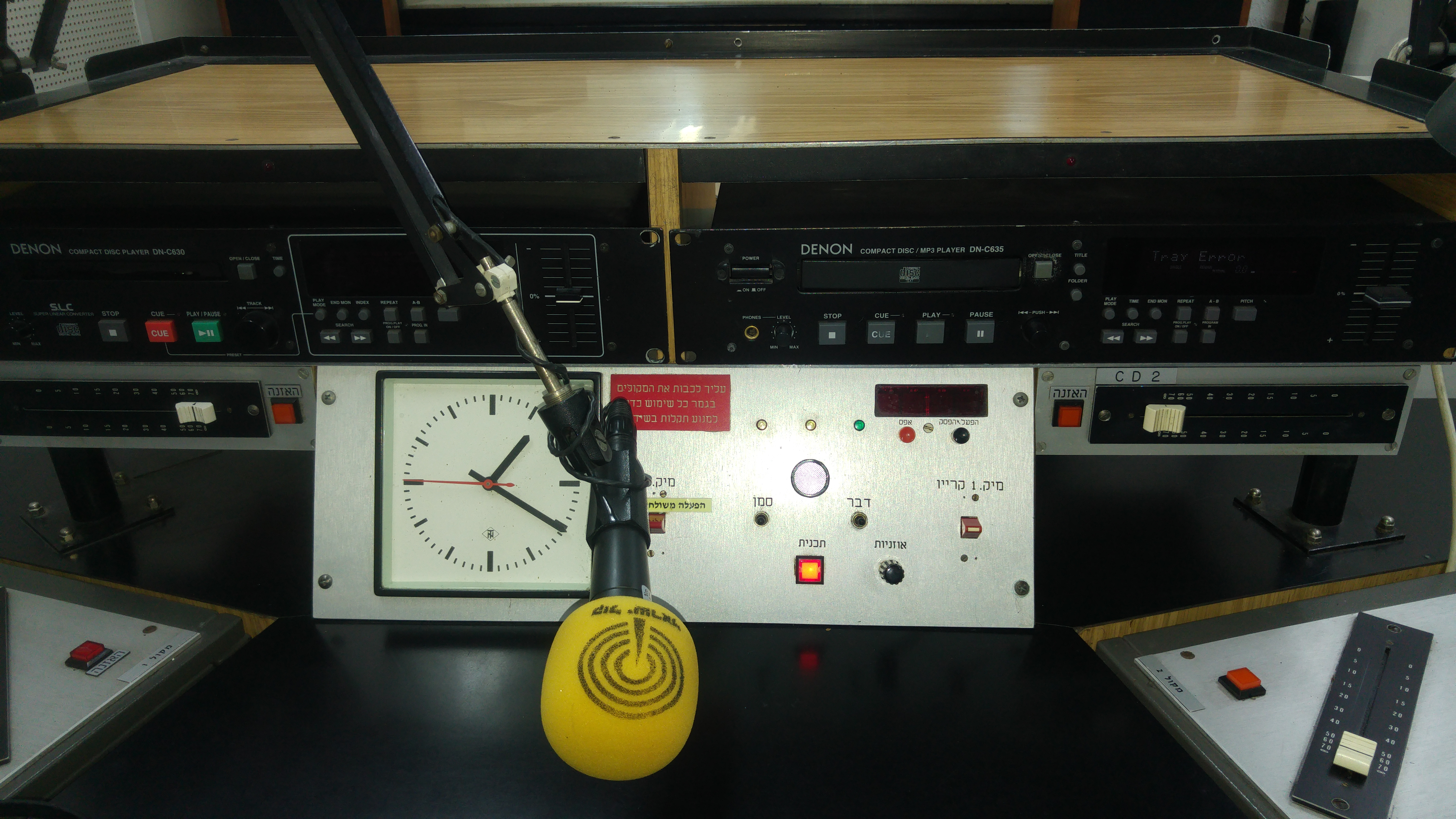
Broadcaster microphone in Kol Yisrael studios near Sarona

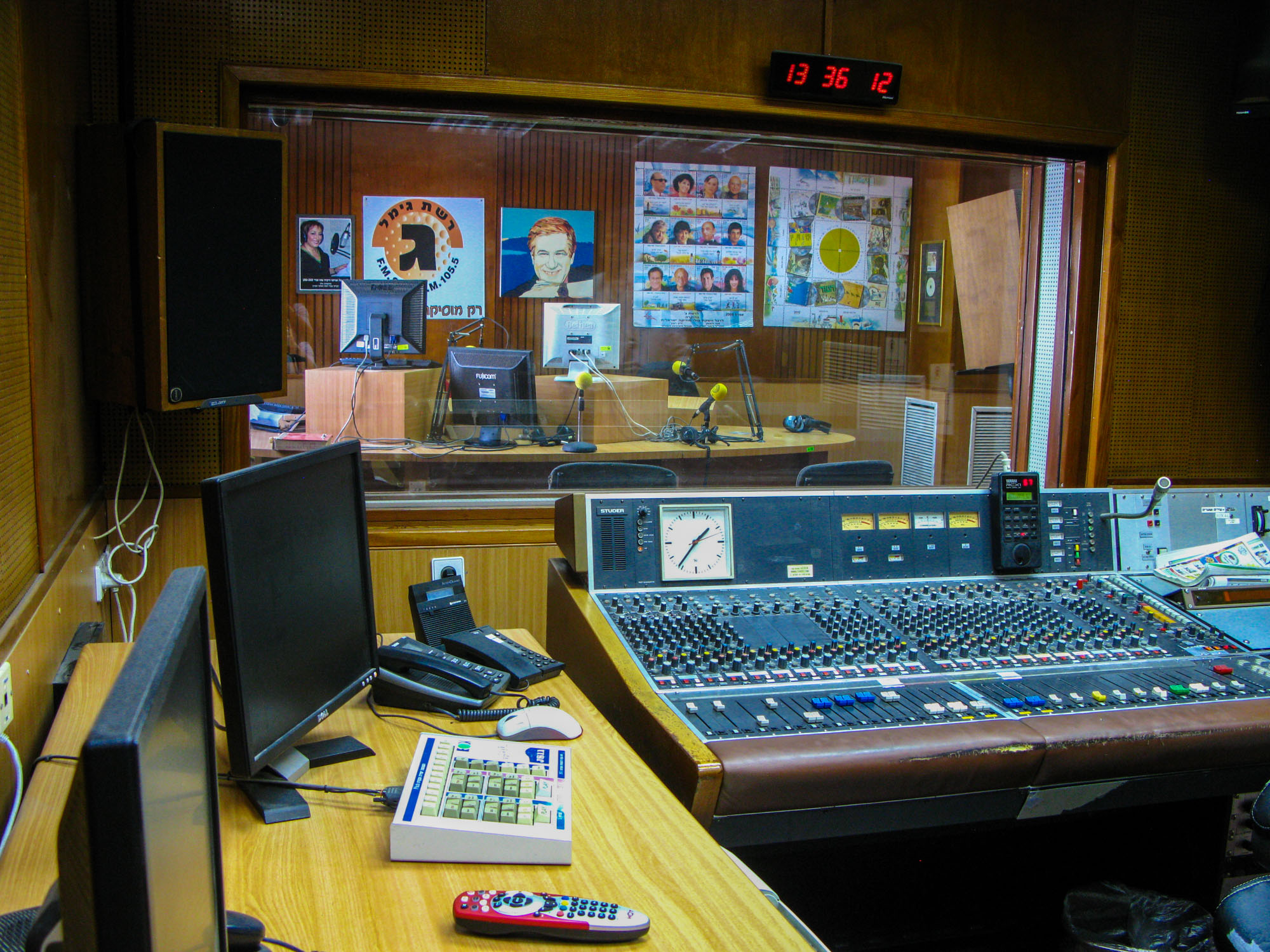
"Reshet Gimel" studio commemorating Ehud Manor

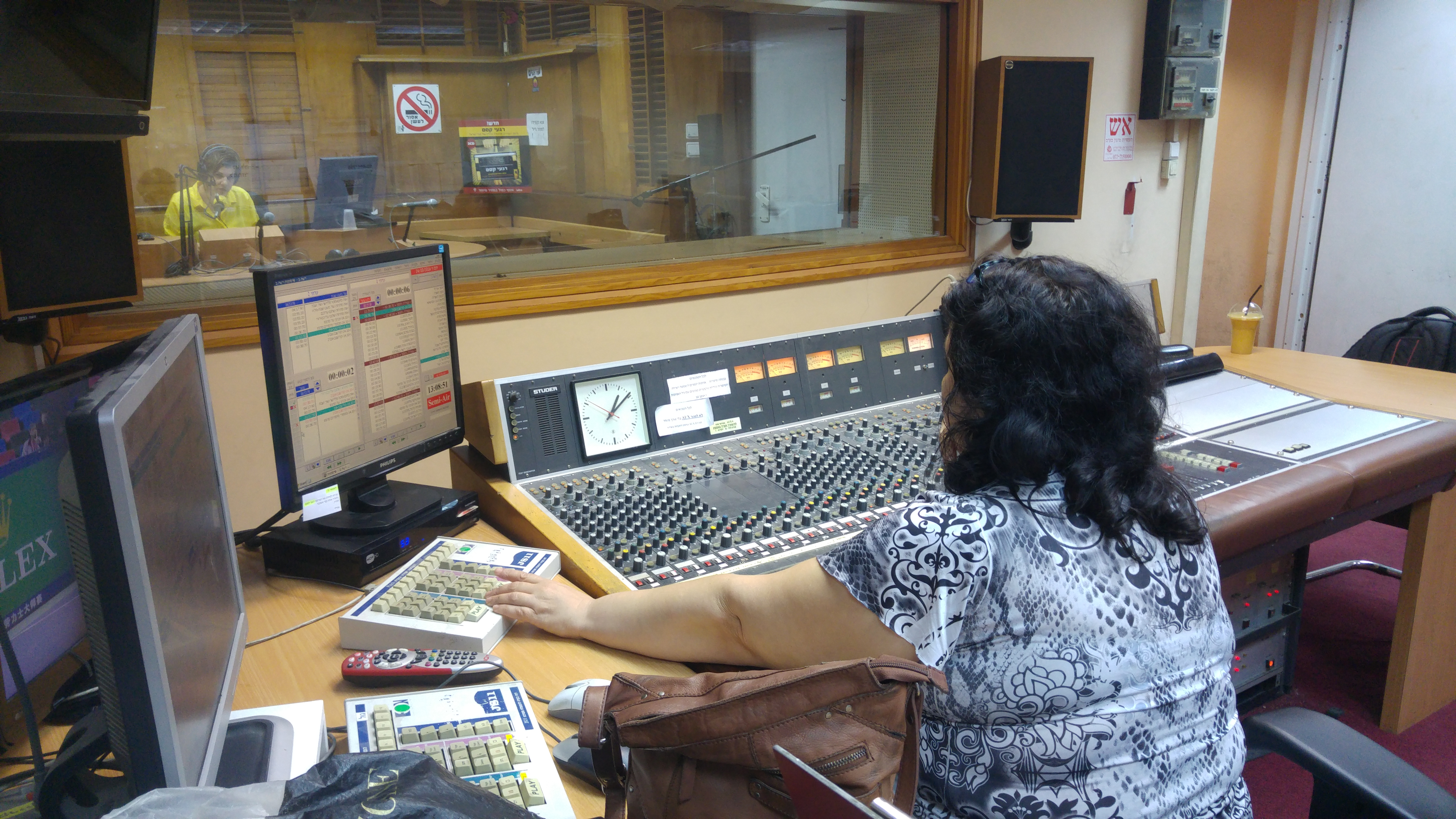
Live show in Kol Yisrael Studios

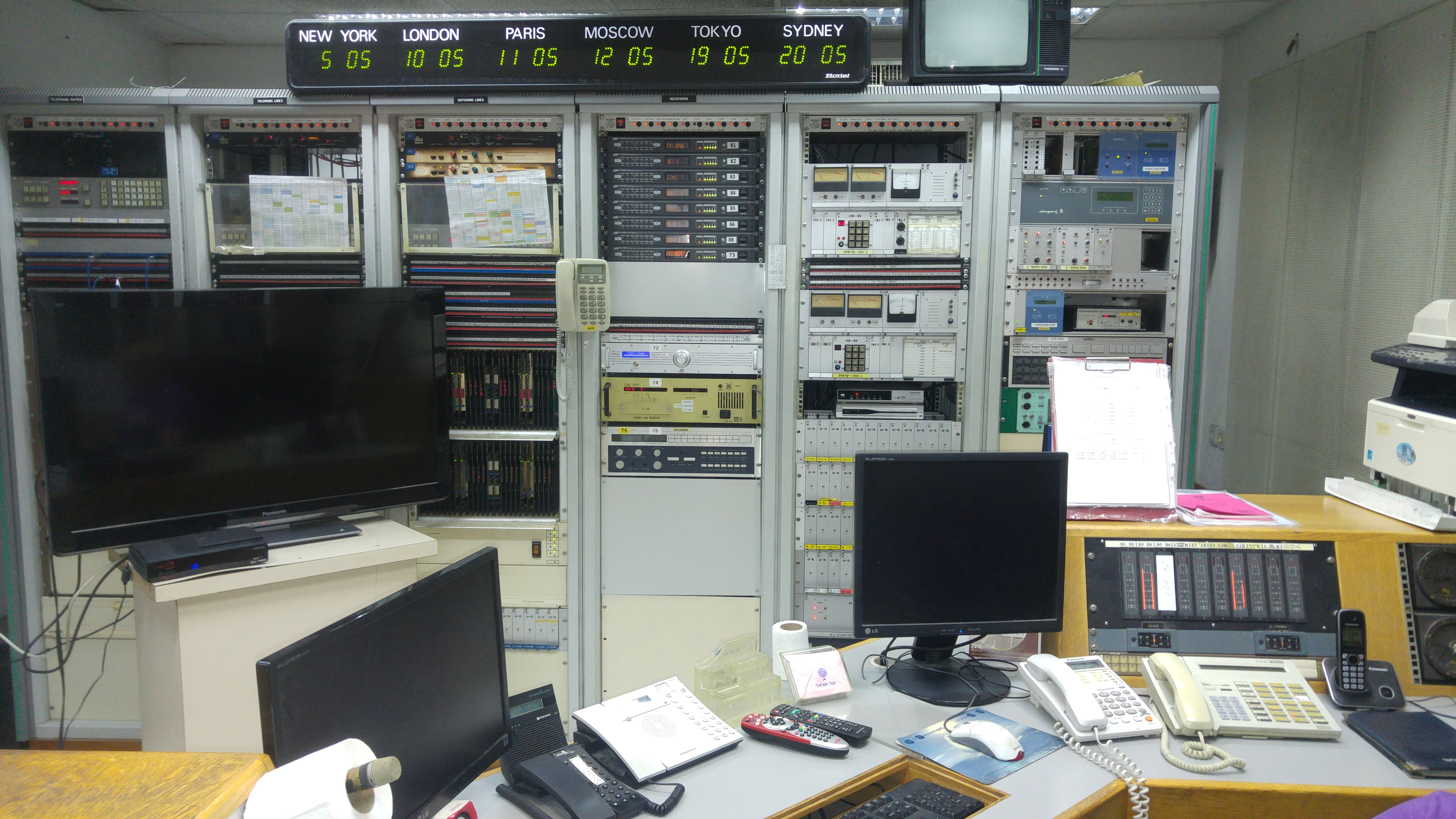
Control and Monitoring room in Kol Yisrael facilities in Tel Aviv

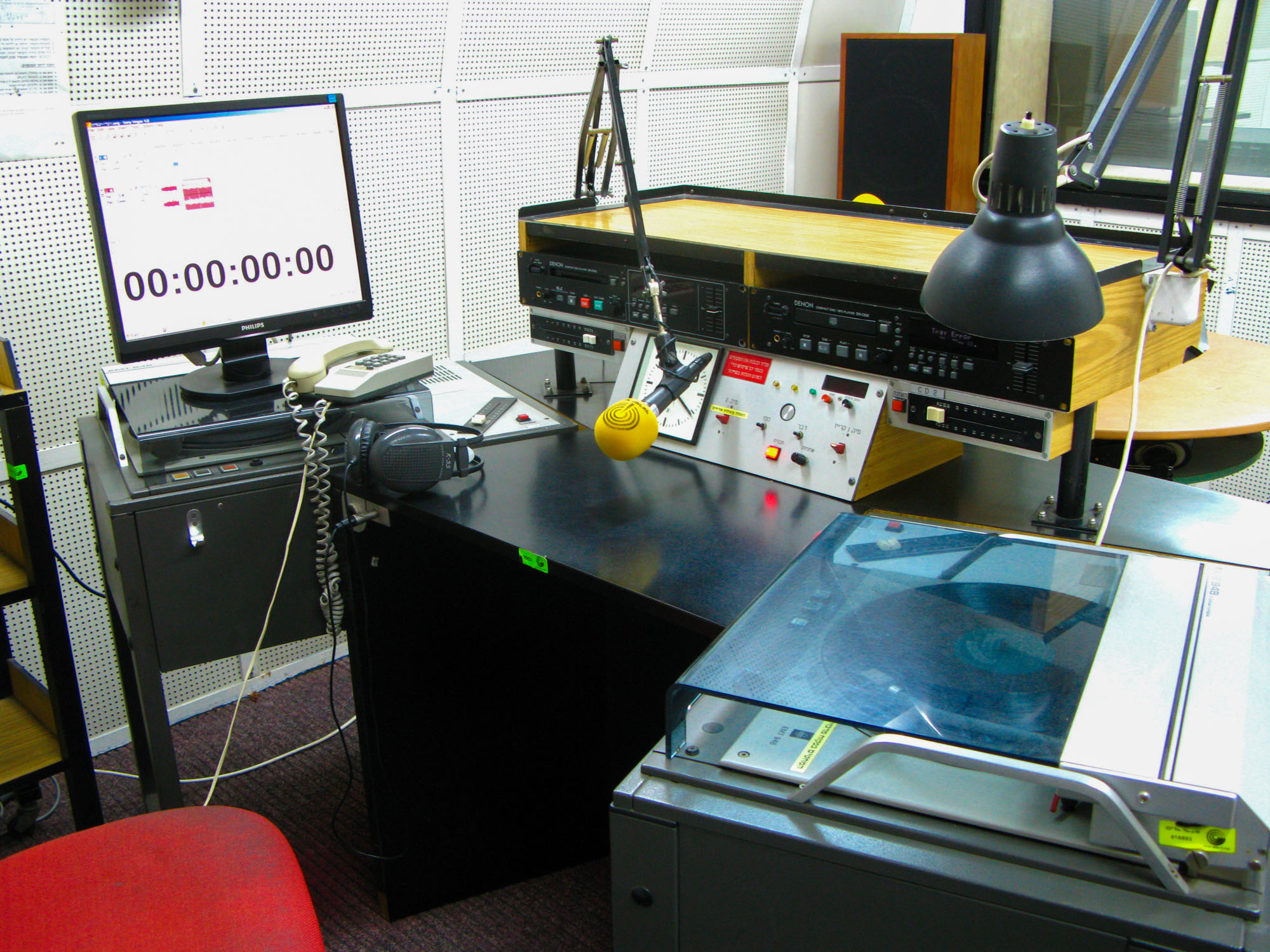
Kol Yisrael Studio

== See also ==
- IBA News
- Israel Broadcasting Authority
- Israel Radio International, the official radio service for immigrants and for listeners outside Israel
- Kol Yerushalayim, the Hebrew program of Jerusalem Calling, the radio station of the British Mandatory Authority
- Media of Israel
