= Galgalatz =

Israeli radio station

- Israel
- Frequencies: 91.8 MHz (Tel Aviv, Bnei Brak); 107 MHz (Haifa; Eilat/Mitzpe Ramon); 107.1 MHz (Jerusalem); 99.8 MHz (Beersheba, Mishmar HaNegev); 104.1 MHz (Northern Israel)

Programming
- Format: Top 40 (CHR); traffic information

Ownership
- Owner: Israel Defense Forces
- Sister stations: Army Radio (Galatz)

History
- First air date: 31 October 1993

Links
- Website: glz.co.il/גלגלצ

Galgalatz or GLGLZ (Hebrew: גלגלצ), also rendered in English as Army Radio on Wheels, is an Israeli radio station, operated by the Israel Defense Forces. It is broadcast on transmitters across the country and features pop and rock music in English and Hebrew along with traffic bulletins and an hourly news report. The station was started in 1993 as a partnership between the IDF, which also runs Army Radio (known as Galatz), and the Ministry of Transport and Road Safety. Its name combines galgal (Hebrew: גלגל), Hebrew for "wheel", and Galatz. Galgalatz is highly influential in Israeli pop music; in 2007, Barry Davis of The Jerusalem Post called Galgalatz "the country's rock-pop barometer". As of 2024, it had 1.3 million listeners.

== History ==
Galgalatz began broadcasting on 31 October 1993. It became a 24-hour service in February 1997, when an overnight simulcast of Army Radio was discontinued.

In 2003, Army Radio and Galgalatz were barred for 12 hours from airing pop music as part of a four-year legal dispute with the Society of Authors, Composers and Music Publishers in Israel (ACUM) over unpaid royalties. Classical and Israeli folk music were aired in lieu of popular compositions on Army Radio, while Galgalatz aired its customary traffic updates with call-in content from listeners.

Defense minister Moshe Ya'alon and culture and sports minister Miri Regev entered into a public row in 2015 over a proposal that Galgalatz alter its playlist to increase airplay of domestic artists and Mizrahi music. Regev later secured the approval of prime minister Benjamin Netanyahu to establish a new station consisting primarily of older Israeli music.

The IDF radio stations originally broadcast from Jaffa. In 2018, plans were announced to relocate Army Radio and Galgalatz to studios in Jerusalem.

After the October 7 attacks, the morning show began dedicating the second song of every hour to a hostage in Gaza.

== Charts ==
Every Thursday Galgalatz airs the "Official Music Chart Of Israel", which includes top 10 Israeli and international songs, based on the audience's choice on the station's website. In 2000, Galgalatz took over producing its own top-20 chart from Army Radio. On the last Friday of the year, Galgalatz also broadcasts the Israeli annual international song chart. On 31 December 2019, Galgalatz aired the official hot 100 decade-chart.

== See also ==
- List of radio stations in Israel
- Israeli annual Hebrew song chart
- Army Radio
