= Israel Broadcasting Authority =

Israeli public broadcaster (1948–2017)

Israel Broadcasting Authority רשות השידור

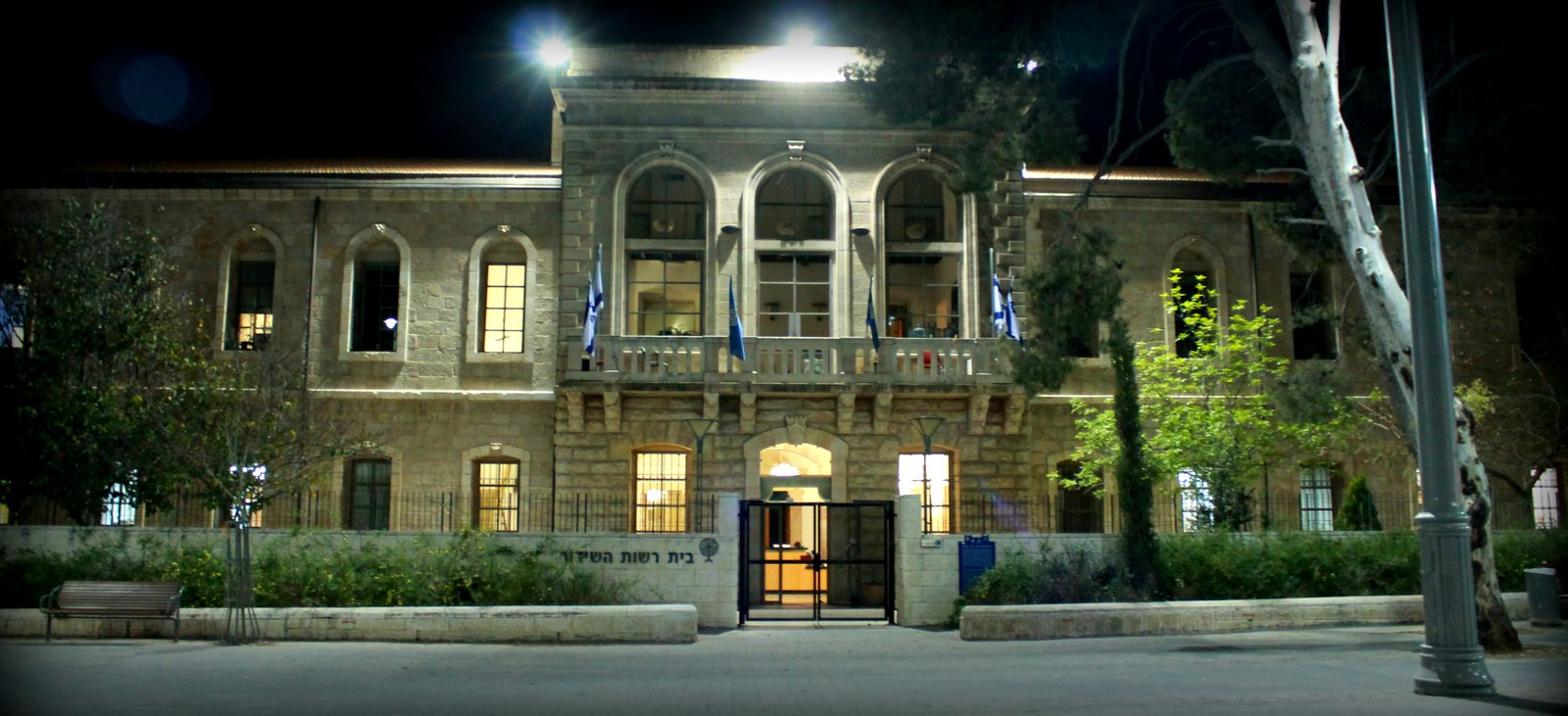
- Type: Broadcast radio and television
- Country: Israel
- Availability: National; international
- Owner: Government of Israel
- Launch date: 1948; 78 years ago (radio); 1968; 58 years ago (television)
- Dissolved: 9 May 2017 (regular programming); 13 May 2017 (final television transmission); 14 May 2017 (final radio transmission)
- Former names: Israel Broadcasting Service (1951–1965)
- Official website: www.iba.org.il Archived 25 January 2017 at the Wayback Machine
- Replaced by: Israeli Public Broadcasting Corporation

The Israel Broadcasting Authority (IBA; Hebrew: רָשׁוּת השִּׁדּוּר, romanized: Rashút HaShidúr, lit. 'The Broadcast Authority') was Israel's public broadcaster from 1948 to 2017, succeeded by the Israeli Public Broadcasting Corporation (IPBC).

== History ==
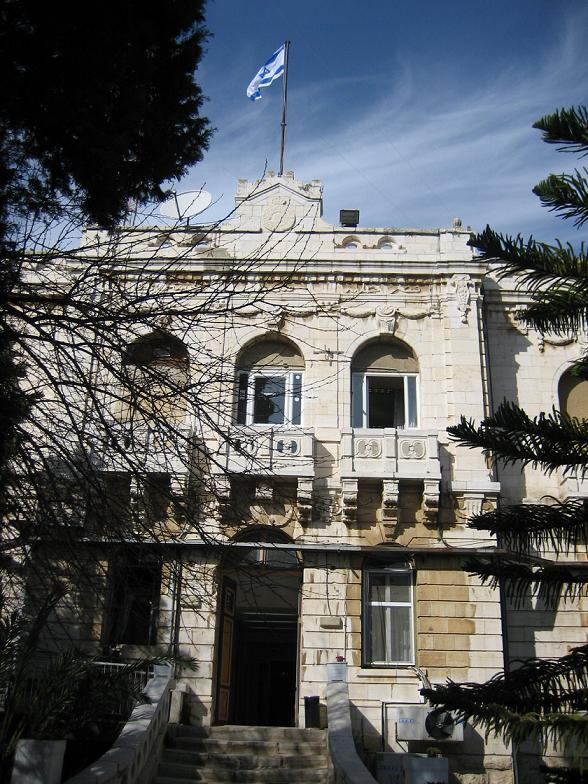
Kol Yisrael building on Heleni Hamalka Street, Jerusalem

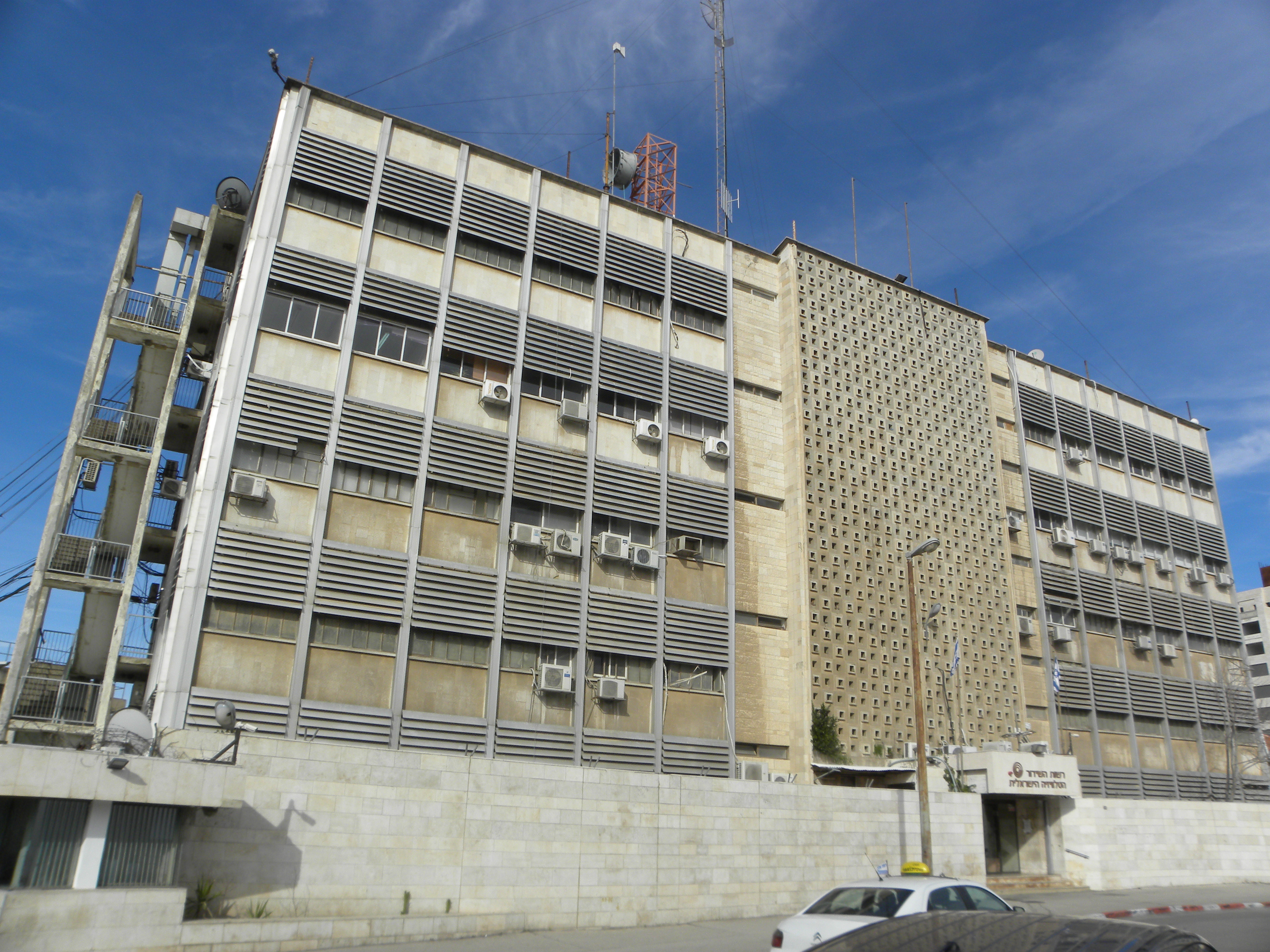
IBA headquarters in Romema, Jerusalem (January 2016)

The Israel Broadcasting Authority was an outgrowth of the radio station Kol Yisrael, which made its first broadcast as an independent station on 14 March 1948. The name of the organization operating Kol Yisrael was changed to Israel Broadcasting Service in 1951. The law creating the Israel Broadcasting Authority was passed by the Knesset on 6 June 1965. Television broadcasts commenced on 2 May 1968, with color television following on 23 February 1983, although occasional color transmissions, of such events as the Eurovision Song Contest 1979 and the visit of the Egyptian president Anwar Sadat in 1977, had been made earlier. IBA operated two television channels and eight radio stations.

In 1990, the Israeli parliament passed a law that resulted in the creation of the Second Israeli Broadcasting Authority, whose function was to enable and regulate commercial television and private radio broadcasts in Israel. Before the establishment of the Second Broadcasting Authority and the subsequent widespread availability in Israel of cable television and satellite pay TV services (which also produce their own programming directed at the local market in the early 1990s (cable) and 2001 (satellite DTH service), the IBA had enjoyed a virtual monopoly of television and radio broadcasting and production in the country. There were a few exceptions, such as the morning and afternoon broadcasts produced by Israel Educational Television and delivered via the IBA's television channel, the popular Israel Defense Forces Radio service, and a private radio station (the Voice of Peace) which operated offshore, outside Israeli territorial waters.

Most of the Israel Broadcasting Authority's domestic programming was funded until the end of 2015 by the levying of television license fees upon the owners of television sets. This fee was the primary source of revenue for the IBA's television services; its radio stations, however, carried full advertising and its TV programs were sometimes "sponsored" by commercial entities as a supplement to this income. Additionally, all car owners in Israel paid a radio levy through their annual car ownership license. IBA broadcasting was covered by the code of ethics set out in the Nakdi Report.

The IBA (IBS at the time) was admitted as a fully active member of the European Broadcasting Union in 1957. The decision made by the EBU General Assembly had the immediate effect that two founding broadcasters (the Egyptian and Syrian broadcasting services) quit as active members.

The IBA provided news programming in 14 foreign languages, directed at audiences both abroad and in Israel through its IBA News programming available on the internet and through rebroadcasters. The IBA ceased to use shortwaves for its radio overseas transmissions in the mid-2000s.

In 2014, the Israeli cabinet approved reforms that would see the IBA closed and a new public broadcasting body take its place. The replacement network would operate three separate television channels: a Hebrew, an Arabic, and a children's channel. As part of the reforms, the television tax levied on all Israelis who own televisions to support the IBA was to be abolished by March 2015. Eventually, the reform did not advance as originally planned and the target date was extended to 2018. Eight new national radio stations were to be created in place of the existing Kol Israel radio network.

The IBA was supposed to be replaced by the Israeli Public Broadcasting Corporation (IPBC) on 1 October 2016, but the launch was postponed until the beginning of 2018. The proposed model for the IPBC had been criticized by the European Broadcasting Union (EBU), which opposed the tying of the IPBC's finances to budgets decided upon directly by politicians and the planned absence of news services. EBU rules prescribe that a public broadcaster must provide a news service in order to qualify for membership. After several delays, the plans were changed to allow the IPBC to start its operations on 15 May 2017.

== Closure ==
Two hours before the broadcast of Mabat LaHadashot (A Glance at the News) on 9 May 2017, the staff were informed that it would be the last show. Partial programming on Channel 1 resumed the next day, without news programmes, while Channel 33 was shut down with just a slide explaining the closure in Arabic. All IBA Radio stations continued to broadcast news on the hour and music programming until 15 May.

The final program shown by the IBA TV Channel 1 was the Eurovision Song Contest 2017 where Israel was a finalist. A minimal crew of twenty people had remained to ensure a smooth broadcast of the second semi-final on 11 May, with the grand final on 13 May. The program was televised on Channel 1 with no commentary and subtitles during the program for voting purposes. IBA's 88FM radio station also broadcast the program, with live commentary by Kobi Menora, Dori Ben Ze'ev and Alon Amir. During announcement of the Israeli jury's votes, announcer Ofer Nachshon bid farewell to the contest on behalf of the IBA.

The final IBA transmission was a radio broadcast of the program Progressive and Other Animals on 88FM on 14 May, hosted by Boaz Cohen. The last song to be broadcast was Pink Floyd's "Shine On You Crazy Diamond".

== TV channels ==
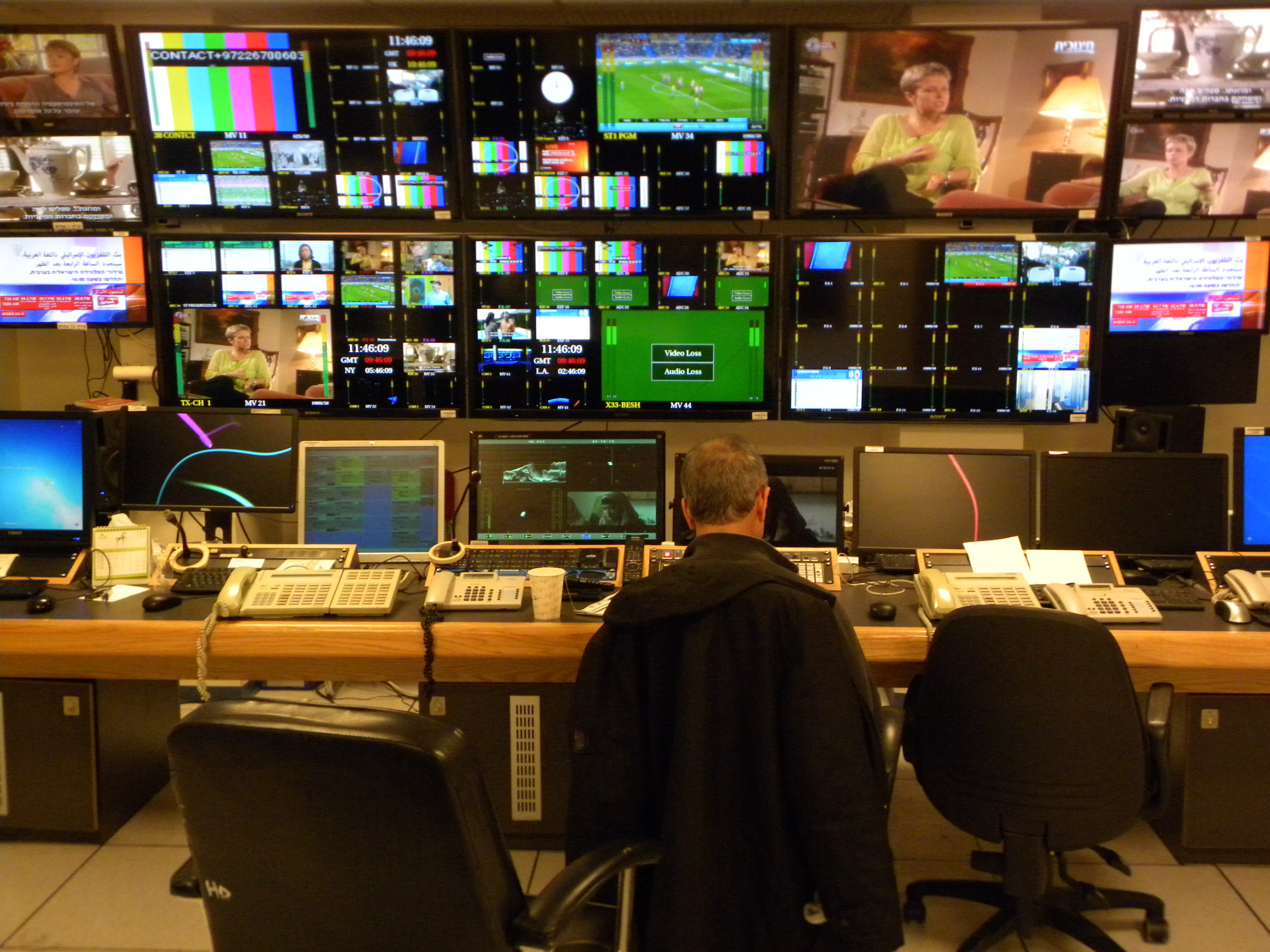
HD control room of IBA's Television Channel 1

- Channel 1 (Haarutz Ha-Rishon) – The IBA's main channel (until the beginning of the 1990s there were no other channels on Israeli television, and it was called "Ha-Televizia Ha-israelit" – "The Israeli Television"). Part of the weekday daytime schedule is made up of broadcasts from Israeli Educational TV.
- Channel 1 HD (Haarutz Ha-Rishon HD) – The IBA's main channel, broadcast in HD. Initially available only via Hot (the only cable pay TV service in Israel) and "YES" (the only DTH satellite pay TV service in Israel)
- Channel 33 – News and factual programming during the day, Arabic-language channel in the evening.

== Radio stations ==
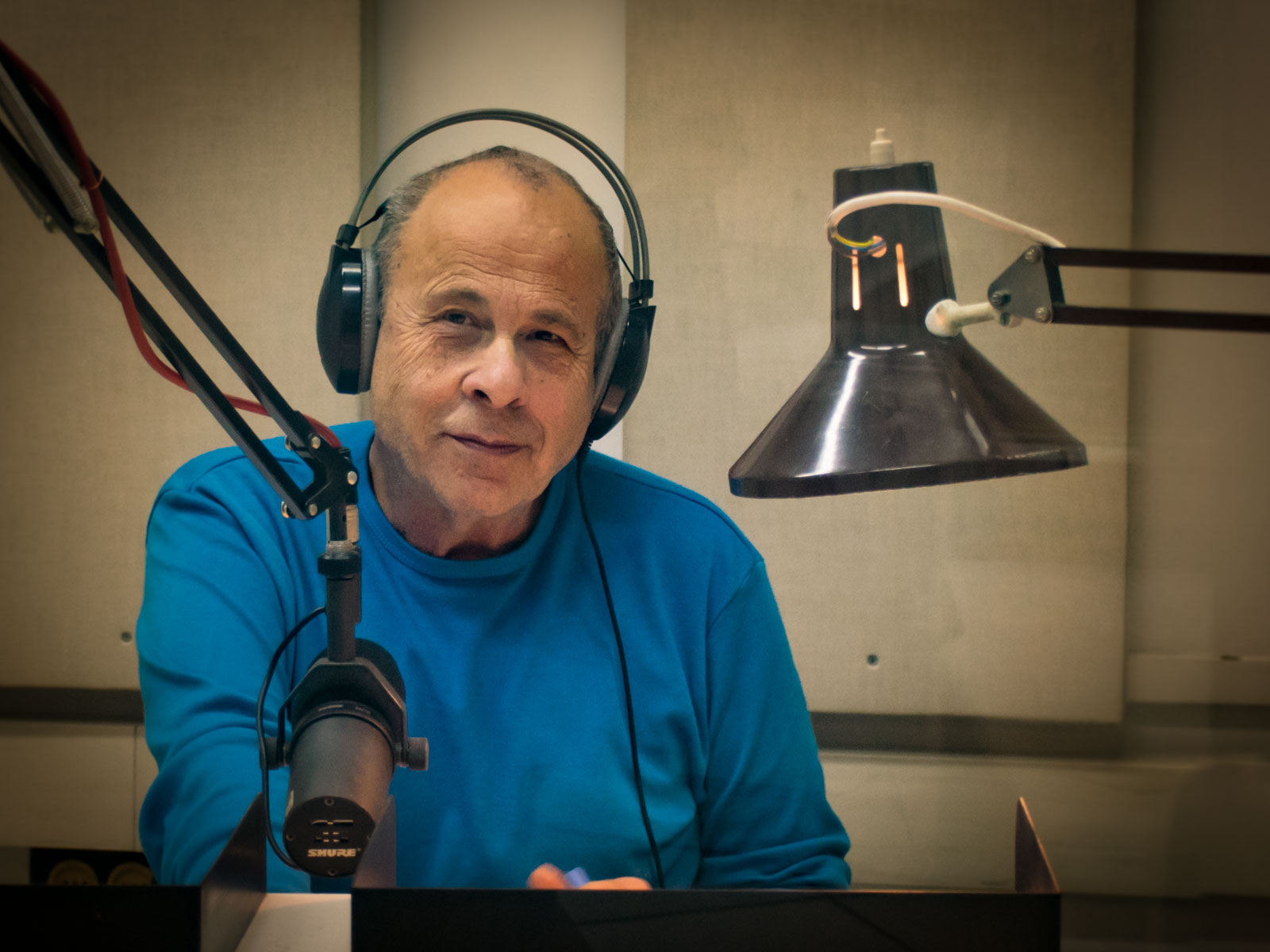
Kobi Barkai reading the hourly newscast in Kol Israel studios

Kol Yisrael ("The Voice of Israel") is the collective name for IBA's radio networks, as well as for the international service.

- Reshet Aleph ("Network A"): arts and culture radio station.
- Reshet Bet ("Network B"): popular news, current events, and talk radio station.
- Reshet Gimmel ("Network C"): radio station devoted to promoting Israeli music.
- Reshet Dalet ("Network D"): radio station in Arabic, featuring a combination of talk and (generally) classical Arabic music.
- Reka or Reshet Klitat 'Aliya: radio for recent immigrants to Israel, broadcasts in 13 languages (mostly Russian). This service was formerly known as "Kol Zion La-Golah" ("Voice of Israel abroad") and Reshet Heh ("Network E").
- 88FM: radio for 'quality music': adult contemporary, jazz, classic rock, alternative, progressive rock, and world music. This service was operated between 1995–2017 and used the 88FM frequency that was formerly used by Kol Haderech Le'assakim ("Voice of the road for business").
- Kol Ha-Musika ("The Voice of Music"): a radio station devoted to Classical music.
- Reshet Moreshet: Tradition and culture radio station

== See also ==
- Israel Radio International, the official radio service for immigrants and for listeners outside Israel
- Kol Yerushalayim, the Hebrew program of Jerusalem Calling, the radio station of the British Mandatory Authority
- Media of Israel
