= The X Factor Israel season 4 =

The X Factor Israel
- Season 4
- Hosted by: Liron Weizman; Ran Danker (guest host); Guy Zu-Aretz (guest host)
- Judges: Aviv Geffen; Netta; Margol; Ran Danker; Miri Mesika
- Winner: Michael Ben David
- Runner-up: Eli Huli

Release
- Original network: Reshet 13, Kan 11
- Original release: October 30, 2021 – February 5, 2022

Season chronology
- ← Previous; Season 3

The X Factor Israel is the Israeli version of the British television music competition The X Factor. The fourth season run between October 30, 2021, and February 5, 2022, on Reshet 13, airing in prime time.

On April 6, 2021, it was announced that the winner of this season would represent Israel in the Eurovision Song Contest 2022. Michael Ben David was the selected entrant with the song "I.M".

== Judges and hosts ==
Liron Weizman hosts the fourth season. All the members of the judging panel changed from the previous season: Mizrahi singer Margalit Tzan'ani, singer-songwriter Aviv Geffen, singer and Eurovision 2018 winner Netta Barzilai, while a fourth and fifth judges revealed to be Ran Danker and Miri Mesika, making it the first season of X Factor Israel to feature five judges instead of four.

Show creator Simon Cowell was originally announced as a judge for the season before pulling out.

=== Auditions ===
The auditions started on October 30, 2021, and ended on December 12. Contestants need to get "yes" from at least four of the five judges in order to qualify.

Among the contestants were: Inbal Bibi, a competitor of season 1 of The X Factor Israel; Adi Cohen and Liron Lev, a finalist and a competitor of Kokhav Nolad season 2; Linet, a singer who participated in the Kdam Eurovision 1993; Sapir Saban, who won in season 4 of The Voice Israel; Shachar Adawi, a competitor of Rising Star season 6; the hip hop duo Ido B Zooki; Amit Ben Zaken, the brother of The X Factor Israel season 1 contestant Eden Ben Zaken; Gai Sims, the son of basketball player Willie Sims; Shira Atias, the cousin of representor of Israel in the Eurovision Song Contest 2015 Nadav Guedj; Shimi Tavori, a singer who participated in the Kdam Eurovision 1991 and 1993; Yifat Ta'asa, the ex-wife of singer Arik Sinai; Eli Huli, another contestant of The Voice Israel season 4; songwriter Maya Simantov; Ahtaliyah Pierce, a competitor of the second season of The Voice Israel; Zohar Raziel, a competitor of American Idol and Rising Star season 5; basketball player brothers Ben and Nimrod Altit; Daniel Pruzansky, a member of Kids.il, the band that represented Israel in the Junior Eurovision Song Contest 2012; Maor Titon, a competitor of season 1 of The Voice Israel; Yohai Moreno, the brother of late Lieutenant colonel Emmanuel Moreno; Michael Rose (formerly Misha Soukhinin), a member of rock band Distorted Harmony which was also a competitor of the second season of The Voice Israel; Inbar Yochananof, a member of the Voca People; Shalva Berti, a singer who participated in the Kdam Eurovision 1985, 1992 and 1995; Hadar Lee, a competitor of season 2 of The X Factor Israel; and Danna Reuveni, the granddaughter of poet Ehud Manor. TV host Guy Zu-Aretz participated in the auditions as well, but only as a cameo.

Draw	Performer	Song	Judges' vote					Result
Draw	Performer	Song	Danker	Barzilai	Mesika	Geffen	Tzan'ani	Result
Audition 1 (October 30, 2021)
1	Cama Camila	"Sweet Dreams"	Yes	Yes	Yes	No	Yes	Advanced
2	Ilay Elmakies	"Etz Yarok MiPlastic"	Yes	Yes	Yes	Yes	Yes	Advanced
3	Micheal Ben David	"Juice" / "Ima"	Yes	Yes	Yes	Yes	Yes	Advanced
4	Saray Adar	"Veich Shelo"	No	–	–	No	Yes	Eliminated
5	Anna Stefani	"Soldi"	–	Yes	Yes	Yes	Yes	Advanced
6	Inbal Bibi	"Time After Time"	Yes	Yes	Yes	Yes	Yes	Advanced
7	Elisha Nachmias	"Yesh Li Sikui"	Yes	Yes	Yes	Yes	Yes	Advanced
Audition 2 (November 1, 2021)
1	Adi Cohen & Liron Lev	"Nothing Compares 2 U"	Yes	Yes	Yes	Yes	Yes	Advanced
2	Abigail Moyal	"Shlach Li MalAch"	Yes	Yes	Yes	Yes	–	Advanced
3	Roei Edri	"Mesiba"	No	–	Yes	No	–	Eliminated
4	Gali Ben Shoshan	"Akşam Olmadan"	Yes	Yes	Yes	Yes	Yes	Advanced
5	Linet	"Shemesh"	Yes	Yes	Yes	Yes	Yes	Advanced
Audition 3 (November 4, 2021)
1	Tarante Groove Machine	"Yaleli"	Yes	Yes	Yes	Yes	Yes	Advanced
2	Shahar Admoni	"Ulai"	Yes	Yes	Yes	Yes	Yes	Advanced
3	Men Yahel	"BilAdaich"	–	–	–	–	–	Eliminated
4	Sapir Saban	"Hopelessly Devoted to You"	Yes	Yes	Yes	Yes	Yes	Advanced
5	Yuval Levkovski	"Hard to Say I'm Sorry"	Yes	Yes	Yes	Yes	Yes	Advanced
Audition 4 (November 7, 2021)
1	Shachar Adawi	"Hello"	Yes	Yes	Yes	Yes	Yes	Advanced
2	Ido B Zooki	"Ba Kalil"	No	Yes	Yes	Yes	Yes	Advanced
3	Anna Shpitz	"Soon We'll Be Found"	Yes	No	Yes	No	Yes	Eliminated
4	Amit Ben Zaken	"Lo Bikashti Milkhama"	Yes	Yes	Yes	Yes	Yes	Advanced
Audition 5 (November 9, 2021)
1	Uriah Azari	"Nishba"	Yes	Yes	Yes	Yes	Yes	Advanced
2	May Maya Malul	"Ad SheTa'azov"	–	–	–	No	No	Eliminated
3	Gai Sims	"Just the Two of Us"	Yes	Yes	Yes	Yes	Yes	Advanced
4	Stevie June	"Dancing On My Own"	Yes	Yes	Yes	Yes	–	Advanced
5	Amit Shetach	"Cuckoo"	Yes	Yes	Yes	Yes	Yes	Advanced
Audition 6 (November 11, 2021)
1	Itay Paz	"The Boxer"	Yes	No	Yes	Yes	Yes	Advanced
2	Zehava Cohen	"Fug Al Nahal"	Yes	Yes	Yes	Yes	Yes	Advanced
3	Yoav Dalal	"Im Tirtzi"	–	–	–	–	–	Eliminated
4	Shira Atias	"Jealous"	Yes	–	Yes	Yes	Yes	Advanced
5	Shimi Tavori	"Khipasti Shirim Latzet LaOlam"	Yes	Yes	Yes	Yes	Yes	Advanced
Audition 7 (November 14, 2021)
1	Ron Vaknin	"Omed BaSha'ar"	Yes	Yes	Yes	Yes	Yes	Advanced
2	Hila Segev	"Zan Nadir"	–	No	Yes	Yes	No	Eliminated
3	Nadir Hawa	"Save Your Tears"	Yes	Yes	Yes	Yes	–	Advanced
4	Yifat Ta'asa	"The Greatest Love of All"	No	–	–	No	–	Eliminated
5	Tal Tzuker	"Kashe Bil'adecha"	–	–	No	No	Yes	Eliminated
6	Eli Huli	"Everybody's Changing"	Yes	Yes	Yes	Yes	Yes	Advanced
Audition 8 (November 16, 2021)
1	Petahya Levi	"HaIm Lihiyot Bach MeOhav"	Yes	Yes	No	Yes	No	Eliminated
2	Maya Simantov	"Can't Help Falling in Love"	Yes	Yes	Yes	Yes	Yes	Advanced
3	Mor Chenson	"Sex Bomb"	Yes	No	Yes	–	No	Eliminated
4	Shaya Avitan	"In a Manner of Speaking"	–	Yes	Yes	Yes	Yes	Advanced
5	Guy Zu-Aretz	"Mistovev"	—N/a					Not competing
Audition 9 (November 18, 2021)
1	Eitiel Zini	"At Heruti"	–	Yes	–	No	No	Eliminated
2	Gai'da Abu Awad	"Ala Bali"	Yes	Yes	Yes	Yes	Yes	Advanced
3	Tzlil Halaf	"Yeladim Ka'ele"	No	–	–	No	–	Eliminated
4	Udi Tzabari	"HaMe'antezet"	No	Yes	Yes	No	Yes	Eliminated
5	Chen Hazot	"Banadik"	Yes	Yes	Yes	Yes	Yes	Advanced
6	Libi (Reut Naftali)	"Don't Start Now"	Yes	No	Yes	Yes	Yes	Advanced
Audition 10 (November 21, 2021)
1	Ruth Hatuma	"Sipur Machur"	Yes	Yes	Yes	No	Yes	Advanced
2	Avraham Hatuma	"Yesh Dvarim SheRatziti Lomar"	Yes	Yes	Yes	No	Yes	Advanced
3	Dganit Dado	"Toy"	–	–	–	–	–	Eliminated
4	Ahtaliyah Pierce	"Versace on the Floor"	Yes	Yes	Yes	Yes	Yes	Advanced
5	Beast Crew	"Imale"	Yes	Yes	Yes	Yes	–	Advanced
6	Agam Abuchatzeira	"Ulai"	Yes	Yes	Yes	Yes	Yes	Advanced
Audition 11 (November 23, 2021)
1	Dan Biton	"Ksh'At Atzuva"	Yes	Yes	Yes	Yes	Yes	Advanced
2	Pazi (Paz Epstein)	"Ro'a Lecha Ba'Eynaim"	Yes	Yes	Yes	No	No	Eliminated
3	Anna RF	"Azal HaMlai"	Yes	Yes	No	No	Yes	Eliminated
4	Netta Rosenvelt	"Safe and Sound"	No	Yes	Yes	Yes	Yes	Advanced
5	Almog Fadida	"Ma Ata Rotze MiMeni"	Yes	Yes	Yes	No	Yes	Advanced
6	Lia Navipur	"Wrecking Ball"	Yes	Yes	Yes	Yes	Yes	Advanced
Audition 12 (November 25, 2021)
1	Yahali Akunis	"Tel Aviv Ze Ani VeAt"	Yes	Yes	Yes	No	Yes	Advanced
2	Zohar Raziel	"Arcade"	No	Yes	Yes	Yes	Yes	Advanced
3	Ben Altit	"Ima Im Hayiti"	–	–	–	–	–	Eliminated
4	Nimrod Altit	"Fast Car"	No	No	–	–	–	Eliminated
5	Shirel Ahiel	"Anyone"	Yes	Yes	Yes	Yes	Yes	Advanced
6	Shiran and Ron	"FadayTak"	Yes	Yes	Yes	Yes	–	Advanced
Audition 13 (November 28, 2021)
1	Noy Azoulay	"I Have Nothing"	Yes	Yes	Yes	Yes	Yes	Advanced
2	Daniel Pruzansky	"A Yiddishe Mamme"	–	No	–	–	No	Eliminated
3	Liza Orman	"Umbrella"	Yes	Yes	Yes	No	Yes	Advanced
4	Maor Titon	"Hayit Li Sheket" / "Aba"	Yes	Yes	Yes	Yes	Yes	Advanced
Audition 14 (November 30, 2021)
1	Rabotai	"Shevet Achim Ve Achayot"	–	–	–	–	–	Eliminated
2	Tomer Almog	"I Have Nothing"	Yes	Yes	Yes	Yes	Yes	Advanced
3	Dor Dahan	"Ale Karan Sheli"	–	–	–	–	–	Eliminated
4	Noam Azut	"Ani Gitara"	Yes	Yes	Yes	No	Yes	Advanced
5	Yalin Ali	"Another Love"	–	–	–	–	–	Eliminated
6	Yohai Moreno	"Tisha'ari Levad"	Yes	No	Yes	Yes	Yes	Advanced
Audition 15 (December 2, 2021)
1	Orian Atia	"Leylotai"	Yes	Yes	Yes	Yes	Yes	Advanced
2	Dahlia Hershofet	"What's Up?"	–	–	–	–	–	Eliminated
3	Noam Banai	"I Need a Dollar"	Yes	Yes	Yes	Yes	No	Advanced
4	Noam Levi	"Juice"	Yes	No	–	No	–	Eliminated
5	Gute Gute	"Rezulutzia Orginal"	No	–	–	No	–	Eliminated
6	Aviv Kharazi	"Metzi'ut Akheret"	Yes	Yes	Yes	Yes	Yes	Advanced
Audition 16 (December 5, 2021)
1	Snir Hadad	"Johnny"	–	–	–	–	–	Eliminated
2	Daniel Mamyev	"Mima At Mefakhedet"	Yes	Yes	Yes	No	Yes	Advanced
3	Toosha (Netta Alexeli)	"Don't You Worry 'bout a Thing"	Yes	Yes	Yes	No	Yes	Advanced
4	Orian Ron	"Mangina"	–	–	–	–	–	Eliminated
5	Orr Alkalai	"Latet VeLakakhat"	–	No	–	No	–	Eliminated
6	Michael Rose	"Tornado"	Yes	No	Yes	Yes	Yes	Advanced
Audition 17 (December 7, 2021)
1	Leah Masihid	"Nihiye Beseder"	Yes	Yes	Yes	Yes	No	Advanced
2	Inbar Yochananof	"Levitating"	–	Yes	Yes	Yes	Yes	Advanced
3	Orr Barak	"I Need You"	No	No	–	–	–	Eliminated
4	Bisan Abu Laban	"Hallelujah"	Yes	Yes	Yes	Yes	Yes	Advanced
5	Ben Tzur	"Lashuv Habaita"	Yes	Yes	Yes	No	Yes	Advanced
6	Shalva Berti	"Tu te reconnaîtras"	–	–	–	–	–	Eliminated
Audition 18 (December 9, 2021)
1	Loren Dervis	"Halev Sheli" / "Rise Up"	Yes	–	Yes	Yes	Yes	Advanced
2	Ido Biton	"Derech HaShalom"	No	–	–	No	–	Eliminated
3	Tomer Maya	"Fallin'"	–	–	–	–	–	Advanced
3	Hadar Lee	"Fallin'"	–	–	–	–	–	Eliminated
4	Alex Rosvitzev	"Let My People Go"	–	–	–	–	–	Eliminated
5	Semi Ohayon	"Pisa MiZikhroni"	–	–	–	–	–	Eliminated
6	Dafna Reuveni	"Mishehu"	Yes	–	Yes	Yes	Yes	Advanced
Audition 19 (December 12, 2021)
1	Yovel Adar	"Eyfo At"	–	–	–	No	No	Eliminated
2	Elyakir Keren	"Lo Ani Hu HaIsh"	–	–	No	No	Yes	Eliminated
3	Nofar Shuker	"Shir Tikva"	Yes	Yes	Yes	Yes	No	Advanced
4	Dana Vais	"This Love"	Yes	No	–	No	–	Eliminated
5	Omer Shuker	"Fly Me to the Moon"	Yes	Yes	Yes	Yes	Yes	Advanced

=== Judge Houses ===
The Judge Houses have begun on December 14, 2021. The judges had to choose from each of their categories 4 out of their 8 members (asides the Groups and Over 25's group, which consists of 9 members).

Key:

– Eliminated in the judges' house

Top 33 – Judges' houses
Category (mentor)	Acts								
Girls (Geffen)	Shira Atias	Toosha (Netta Elkasalsi)	Inbal Bibi	Abigail Moyal	Ruth Hatuma	Sapir Saban	Anna Stefani	Gai'da Abu Awad	
Boys (Netta)	Gai Sims	Yohai Moreno	Micheal Ben David	Eli Huli	Amit Ben Zaken	Shachar Adawi	Elisha Nachmias	Aviv Kharazi	
Groups and Over 25's (Mesika and Margol)	Shimi Tavori	Cama Camila	Linet	Adi Cohen & Liron Lev	Maya Simantov	Tarante Groove Machine	Stevie June	Ido B Zooki	Shiran and Ron
Teens (Danker)	Amit Shetach	Liza Orman	Agam Abuchatzeira	Ron Vaknin	Lia Navipur	Omer Shuker	Shahar Admoni	Ilay Elmakies	

=== Chairs ===
Key:

– Received a chair and passed to the Live Shows
– Received a chair, was later replaced and eventually eliminated
– Didn't receive a chair and was eliminated

Draw	Performer	Song	Mentor's decision	Switched with
December 14, 2021 – Girls (Aviv Geffen)
1	Shira Atias	"Crazy in Love"	Put in chair 1	–
2	Ruth Hatuma	"Al Tevakesh"	Eliminated	–
3	Anna Stefani	"The Sound of Silence"	Put in chair 2	–
4	Toosha (Netta Elkasalsi)	"Breathe Me"	Put in chair 3	–
5	Inbal Bibi	"Killing Me Softly with His Song"	Put in chair 4	–
6	Gai'da Abu Awad	"Alesh"	Put in chair 3	Toosha (Netta Elkasalsi)
7	Abigail Moyal	"Sadot"	Eliminated	–
8	Sapir Saban	"Ruah Yam"	Put in chair 1	Shira Atias
December 16, 2021 – Groups and Over 25's (Miri Mesika and Margalit Tzan'ani)
1	Cama Camila	"Crazy"	Put in chair 1	–
2	Adi Cohen & Liron Lev	"When We Were Young"	Put in chair 2 → Moved to chair 1	Cama Camila
3	Ido B Zooki & Omer Gani	"Ma Tzipit"	Eliminated	–
4	Linet	"Yalnız Değilsin (Khomot Kheimar)"	Put in chair 3	–
5	Stevie June	"I'm So Excited"	Put in chair 4	–
6	Maya Simantov	"Alone"	Put in chair 4	Stevie June
7	Shimi Tavori	"Without You"	Eliminated	–
8	Shiran and Ron	"Hotline Bling"	Put in chair 4	Maya Simantov
9	Tarante Groove Machine	"Make Hafla (Not War)"	Put in chair 2	Adi Cohen & Liron Lev
December 19, 2021 – Boys (Netta Barzilai)
1	Elisha Nachmias	"Kotzim"	Put in chair 1	–
2	Gai Sims	"Kapara Sheli"	Put in chair 2 → Moved to chair 3	Michael Ben David
3	Michael Ben David	"California Dreamin'"	Put in chair 3 → Moved to chair 2	Gai Sims
4	Yohai Moreno	"Blues Knaani"	Eliminated	–
5	Eli Huli	"Broken Strings"	Put in chair 4	–
6	Aviv Kharazi	"Lekh Im HaEmett Shelkha"	Put in chair 3	Gai Sims
7	Shachar Adawi	"Just the Way You Are"	Put in chair 3	Aviv Kharazi
8	Amit Ben Zaken	"Im Ata Gever"	Eliminated	–
December 23, 2021 – Teens (Ran Danker)
1	Omer Shuker	"Eternal Flame"	Put in chair 1	–
2	Amit Shetach	"Neshima"	Put in chair 2	–
3	Liza Orman	"You Don't Own Me"	Put in chair 3	–
4	Ron Vaknin	"Rotza Shalom"	Put in chair 4	–
5	Shahar Admoni	"Lavan BeHalom Shahor"	Put in chair 2	Amit Shetach
6	Agam Abuchatzeira	"Space Oddity"	Put in chair 3	Liza Orman
7	Ilay Elmakies	"Klum Lo Taim"	Put in chair 4	Ron Vaknin
8	Lia Navipur	"Yafa KiLvana"	Put in chair 1	Omer Shuker

=== Live shows ===
Live shows began on December 26, 2021.

=== Results summary ===
Color key

–	Contestant was nominated for elimination and eventually saved from elimination
–	Contestant was nominated for elimination and eventually eliminated
–	Contestant lost the Elimination Chair challenge and was immediately eliminated

Contestant	Week 1		Week 2		Week 3		Week 4		Week 5			Final	
Contestant	Sunday	Thursday	Sunday	Thursday	Sunday	Tuesday	Sunday	Tuesday	Sunday	Thursday		Saturday	
Michael Ben David	Safe	—N/a	—N/a	Safe	—N/a	Safe	—N/a	Safe	Safe	Safe	Safe	Safe	Winner
Eli Huli	Safe	—N/a	—N/a	Safe	Safe	—N/a	Saved	—N/a	Safe	—N/a	—N/a	Safe	2nd place
Inbal Bibi	—N/a	Safe	Safe	—N/a	—N/a	Safe	Safe	—N/a	Safe	—N/a	—N/a	Saved	3rd place
Sapir Saban	—N/a	Safe	—N/a	Safe	Safe	—N/a	—N/a	Saved	Safe	Saved	Saved	4th	Eliminated (week 6, Saturday)
Anna Stefani	—N/a	Safe	—N/a	Saved	Safe	—N/a	—N/a	Safe	Safe	Safe	5th	Eliminated (week 5, Thursday)	
Shachar Adawi	Safe	—N/a	Safe	—N/a	Saved	—N/a	Safe	—N/a	Safe	6th	Eliminated (week 5, Thursday)		
Ilay Elmakies	Safe	—N/a	Safe	—N/a	—N/a	Saved	—N/a	7th	Eliminated (Week 4, Tuesday)				
Linet	—N/a	—N/a	Saved	—N/a	—N/a	Safe	8th	Eliminated (Week 4, Sunday)					
Shiran & Ron	—N/a	Safe	Saved	—N/a	—N/a	9th	Eliminated (Week 3, Tuesday)						
Adi Cohen	—N/a	—N/a	—N/a	Saved	10th	Eliminated (Week 3, Sunday)							
Lia Navipur	Safe	—N/a	—N/a	11th	Eliminated (Week 2, Thursday)								
Tarante Groove Machine	—N/a	Safe	—N/a	12th	Eliminated (Week 2, Thursday)								
Gai'da Abu Awad	—N/a	Safe	13th	Eliminated (Week 2, Sunday)									
Shahar Admoni	Safe	—N/a	14th	Eliminated (Week 2, Sunday)									
Liron Lev	—N/a	15th	Withdrew (Week 1, Thursday)										
Agam Abuchatzeira	16th	Eliminated (Week 1, Sunday)											
Elisha Nachmias	17th	Eliminated (Week 1, Sunday)											

=== Live show details ===
==== Week 1 ====
===== Sunday (December 26) =====
Week 1 Sunday results
Contestant	Order	Song	Results
Boys (Netta Barzilai)
Michael Ben David	1	"It's a Sin"	Safe
Shachar Adawi	2	"Holem Kmo Yossef"	Safe
Elisha Nahmias	3	"Kol Ma SheYesh Li"	Eliminated
Eli Huli	4	"Heathens"	Safe
Teens (Ran Danker)
Agam Abuchatzeira	1	"Heart of Glass"	Eliminated
Ilay Elmakies	2	"Nag'at Li BaLev"	Safe
Shahar Admoni	3	"Paskol Hayai"	Safe
Lia Navipur	4	"The Middle"	Safe

===== Thursday (December 30) =====
Week 1 Thursday results
Contestant	Order	Song	Results
Girls (Aviv Geffen) & Groups and Over 25's (Miri Mesika and Margalit Tzan'ani)
Sapir Saban	1	"Believe"	Safe
Anna Stefani	2	"Save Your Tears"	Safe
Shiran & Ron	3	"Lost on You"	Safe
Gai'da Abu Awad	4	"Nizahta iti Acol"	Safe
Tarante Groove Machine	5	"Ailet Hen"	Safe
Liron Lev	6	"Tikun Klali"	Withdrew
Inbal Bibi	7	"Leilot shel Yare'ah Male"	Safe

==== Week 2 ====
===== Sunday (January 2) =====
Week 2 Sunday results
Contestant	Order	Song	Results
Ilay Elmakies	1	"At Va'Ani"	Safe
Shiran & Ron	2	"Belev Ehad"	Saved
Inbal Bibi	3	"Ne partez pas sans moi"	Safe
Shahar Admoni	4	"Arcade"	Eliminated
Gai'da Abu Awad	5	"Heroes"	Eliminated
Linet	6	"My Number One" / "Ani Ana"	Saved
Shachar Adawi	7	"Diva"	Safe

===== Thursday (January 6) =====
Week 2 Thursday results
Contestant	Order	Song	Results
Tarante Groove Machine	1	"Set Me Free"	Eliminated
Adi Cohen	2	"Rise Like a Phoenix"	Saved
Michael Ben David	3	"Emor Shalom"	Safe
Anna Stefani	4	"Euphoria"	Saved
Lia Navipur	5	"Fuego"	Eliminated
Eli Huli	6	"Toy"	Safe
Sapir Saban	7	"Shvil Habriha"	Safe

==== Week 3 ====
===== Sunday (January 9) =====
Week 3 Sunday results
Contestant	Order	Song	Score	Results
Eli Huli	1	"Tipa Tipa"	87	Safe
Adi Cohen	2	"Alimut"	78	Eliminated
Sapir Saban	3	"Ne'ari Shuva Elai"	84	Safe
Anna Stefani	4	"Hello"	80	Safe
Shachar Adawi	5	"Ani Esh"	79	Saved

===== Tuesday (January 11) =====
Week 3 Tuesday results
Contestant	Order	Song	Score	Results
Inbal Bibi	1	"Akhshav Meunan"	94	Safe
Shiran & Ron	2	"Yama"	80	Eliminated
Linet	3	"Lesham"	92	Safe
Michael Ben David	4	"Etz Yarok MiPlastic"	88	Safe
Ilay Elmakies	5	"Yoman Masa"	86	Saved

==== Week 4 ====
===== Sunday (January 16) =====
Week 4 Sunday results
Contestant	Duel	Order	Song	Score	Results
Round 1
Inbal Bibi	I	1	"Goodbye Yellow Brick Road"	93	Safe
Eli Huli	I	2	"HaPerakh BeGani"	92	Round 2
Shachar Adawi	II	3	"Man in the Mirror"	89	Safe
Linet	II	4	"Someone like You"	75	Round 2
Round 2
Eli Huli	III	5	"Perfect"	None	Saved
Linet	III	6	"Dil Yarası" / "Tipat Mazal"	None	Eliminated

===== Tuesday (January 18) =====
Week 4 Tuesday results
Contestant	Duel	Order	Song	Score	Results
Round 1
Michael Ben David	I	1	"Gadal Li Ktzat Zakan"	91	Safe
Sapir Saban	I	2	"Ve'ani Kore Lakh"	82	Round 2
Anna Stefani	II	3	"Nothing Else Matters"	89	Safe
Ilay Elmakies	II	4	"HaGole"	64	Round 2
Round 2
Sapir Saban	III	5	"Shnei Yeladim BaOlam"	None	Saved
Ilay Elmakies	III	6	"Ahava Kazo"	None	Eliminated

==== Week 5 ====
===== Sunday (January 23) =====
Week 5 Sunday results
Contestant	Duel	Order	Song	Score	Results
Round 1
Inbal Bibi	I	1	"No"	97	Round 2
Shachar Adawi	I	2	"Hey Jude"	81	Thursday
Michael Ben David	II	3	"Efes Ma'amatz"	81	Round 2
Anna Stefani	II	4	"Human"	69	Thursday
Eli Huli	III	5	"Can't Take My Eyes Off You"	92	Round 2
Sapir Saban	III	6	"Egrof"	76	Thursday
Round 2
Michael Ben David	–	7	"Bo'er Bi HaShinuy"	44	Thursday
Eli Huli	–	8	"Angels"	56	Final
Inbal Bibi	–	9	"Shkiot Adumot"	50	Final

===== Thursday (January 27) =====
Week 5 Thursday results
Contestant	Duel	Order	Song	Score	Results
Round 1
Michael Ben David	I	1	"Gimme! Gimme! Gimme! (A Man After Midnight)"	89	Round 2
Sapir Saban	I	2	"Basof Mitraglim LeHakol"	86	Saved (Round 2)
Shachar Adawi	II	3	"Born This Way"	72	Eliminated
Anna Stefani	II	4	"Take Me to Church"	77	Round 2
Round 2
Anna Stefani	–	5	"HaKol Yahol Likrot"	48	Eliminated
Michael Ben David	–	6	"Idontwannabeyouanymore"	54	Final
Sapir Saban	–	7	"Pouch" / "Aramam"	48	Saved (Final)

=== Song selection round ===
Each of the four finalists was given two songs as selected from a public submission by a six-member committee (made up of the director of IPBC/Kan's radio stations, three radio representatives, one television representative and one representative of Reshet 13). The assessment to choose the songs began by mid-November 2021.

On 30 January 2022, the eight songs that qualified for the selection were revealed. Viewers were invited to vote on one of two songs given to each finalist, with voting open to the public on Kan's website and app. On 3 February 2022, each finalist performed both songs they were given during a special selection show, alternatively titled Hashir Shelanu L'Eurovizion ("Our Song for Eurovision"), which was broadcast on Kan 11, Kan Gimel and Kan's digital platforms. The finalists' chosen songs were determined by the viewers (50% of the vote), the judges (25% of the vote) and the professional committee (25% of the vote).

Song selection round – 30 January 2022 – 3 February 2022
Artist	Song	Songwriter(s)	Jury	Professional committee	Public vote	Total	Results
Michael Ben David	"I.M"	Chen Aharoni, Lidor Saadia, Asi Tal	25	20	38	83	Selected
Michael Ben David	"Don't"	Ilya Siniaski	0	5	12	17	Not selected
Eli Huli	"Nostalgia"	Roby Fayer, Eli Huli	5	10	18	33	Not selected
Eli Huli	"Blinded Dreamers"	Roby Fayer, Eli Huli	20	15	32	67	Selected
Inbal Bibi	"Marionette"	Tzlil Klifi, Tal Forer, Mai Cohen	15	10	28	53	Selected
Inbal Bibi	"ZaZa"	May Sfadia	10	15	22	47	Not selected
Sapir Saban	"Head Up"	Ella Doron, Yahel Doron, Naama Gali Cohen, Liron Lev	0	10	21	31	Not selected
Sapir Saban	"Breaking My Own Walls"	Gal Joe Cohen, Eyal Yishay, Dikla Dori, Ido Dankner	25	15	29	69	Selected

=== Final ===
The final was held on 5 February 2022 and took place in the following format: in the first stage, the four finalists performed a special cover version of an existing song they have chosen. Immediately after the first performance, one finalist was eliminated. In the second stage, the remaining three finalists performed the song that was chosen for them to perform at Eurovision. The results are determined by the viewers (50% of the vote), the judges (25% of the vote) and the professional committee (25% of the vote).

Duel round – 5 February 2022
Duel	Draw	Artist	Cover song	Jury	Professional committee	Public vote	Total score	Result
Round 1
I	1	Inbal Bibi	"The Winner Takes It All"	5	0	24	29	Round 2
I	2	Michael Ben David	"Shnei Meshug'aim"	20	25	26	71	Final round
II	3	Sapir Saban	"Badad"	5	10	20	35	Round 2
II	4	Eli Huli	"I'll Be There For You"	20	15	30	65	Final round
Round 2
III	1	Sapir Saban	"Breaking My Own Walls"	0	15	16	31	4th – Eliminated
III	2	Inbal Bibi	"Marionette"	25	10	34	69	Final round

Final round – 5 February 2022
Draw	Artist	Song	Jury	Professional committee	Public vote	Total score	Place
1	Inbal Bibi	"Marionette"	42	44	87	173	3
2	Michael Ben David	"I.M"	50	46	118	214	1
3	Eli Huli	"Blinded Dreamers"	58	60	95	213	2
