= I.M (song) =

2022 song by Michael Ben David

Single by Michael Ben David
- Language: English
- Released: 30 January 2022
- Length: 3:00 (original version); 2:43 (ESC version)
- Songwriters: Chen Aharoni; Lidor Saadia; Asi Tal

Music video
- "I.M" on YouTube

Eurovision Song Contest 2022 entry
- Country: Israel
- Artist: Michael Ben David
- Language: English
- Composers: Chen Aharoni; Lidor Saadia; Asi Tal
- Lyricists: Chen Aharoni; Lidor Saadia; Asi Tal

Finals performance
- Semi-final result: 13th
- Semi-final points: 61

Entry chronology
- ◄ "Set Me Free" (2021)
- "Unicorn" (2023) ►

"I.M" is a song by Israeli singer Michael Ben David. The song represented Israel in the Eurovision Song Contest 2022 after winning The X Factor Israel, Israel's national final. A revamped version of the song was released on 14 March 2022.

== Background ==
"I.M" is inspired by Ben David's childhood and carries a message of having inner strength with the empowering lyrics in the song. As a child Ben David suffered bullying for singing in a high-pitched voice and had a tumultuous relationship with his mother for being gay. His stepfather told him not to tease, not to speak loudly and not to sing as according to his stepfather "that's how girls behave". Eventually Ben David gave his mother an ultimatum, saying that he would not come to any family gatherings if his partner could not come. He began to accept himself afterwards for who he was and forgave those who had bullied him, saying that "Suddenly, I have no revenge. I'm sure those who threw me in the trash do not remember me either. Revenge is not the story. I went through a crazy way, I went through a process with myself.

== Eurovision Song Contest ==
=== The X Factor Israel ===
The Israeli entry for the Eurovision Song Contest 2022 was selected through the fourth season of the reality singing competition The X Factor Israel. The shows were hosted by Liron Weizman and featured a judging panel composed of Margalit Tzan'ani and Miri Mesika (Groups and Over 25's), Aviv Geffen (Girls), Eurovision Song Contest 2018 winner Netta Barzilai (Boys) and Ran Danker (Teens). The competition took place over three months which commenced on 30 October 2021 and concluded on 5 February 2022.

Following the audition phase of the competition 33 contestants advanced after receiving a "yes" from at least four of the five judges. During the Judge Houses and Chairs phase each member of the judging panel selected from each of their categories four out of eight/nine contestants that advanced from the audition phase. The sixteen remaining contestants then competed during the live shows which took place over six weeks and resulted in the selection of four finalists following the fifth week. The four finalists were: Eli Huli, Inbal Bibi, Michael Ben David and Sapir Saban.

The final took place on 5 February 2022. The winner was selected in two rounds. In the duel round the four finalists were divided into two duels and each performed a cover song. Two entries progressed forward to the final round while the two others faced each other off in another duel which picked the third participant of the final round. In the final round the three finalists that advanced from the duel round presented their candidate Eurovision entries chosen through the song selection round. The winner was selected by a combination of the votes from a public vote (50%) and two jury groups consisting of The X Factor Israel 2022 judges (25%) and the professional committee (25%).

"I.M" moved on directly to the final, scoring 65 points in second. In the final the song won the contest in a close battle against Eli Huli's "Blinded Dreamers", finishing just one point above it with 214 points.

=== Eurovision Song Contest 2022 ===
According to Eurovision rules all nations with the exceptions of the host country and the "Big Five" (France, Germany, Italy, Spain and the United Kingdom) are required to qualify from one of two semi-finals in order to compete for the final; the top ten countries from each semi-final progress to the final. The European Broadcasting Union (EBU) split up the competing countries into six different pots based on voting patterns from previous contests with countries with favourable voting histories put into the same pot. On 25 January 2022 an allocation draw was held which placed each country in one of the two semi-finals, as well as which half of the show they would perform in. Israel was placed in the second semi-final, held on 12 May 2022, and performed in the first half of the show. Israel performed 2nd in the running order, during the results Israel was not announced as qualifying for the final. When the full semi-final results were released it showed Israel finished 13th with 61 points with 27 points from the televote and 34 points from the professional juries.

== Charts ==
Chart performance for "I.M"
| Chart (2022) | Peak position |
|---|---|
| Israel Airplay (Media Forest) | 13 |
