= Israel in the Eurovision Song Contest 2022 =

- Eurovision Song Contest 2022
- Country: Israel
- Selection process: The X Factor Israel
- Selection date: 5 February 2022

Competing entry
- Song: "I.M"
- Artist: Michael Ben David
- Songwriters: Chen Aharoni; Lidor Saadia; Asi Tal

Placement
- Semi-final result: Failed to qualify (13th)

Participation chronology

Israel was represented at the Eurovision Song Contest 2022 in Turin, Italy with the song "I.M", written by Chen Aharoni, Lidor Saadia, and Asi Tal, and performed by Michael Ben David. The Israeli participating broadcaster, the Israeli Public Broadcasting Corporation (IPBC/Kan), collaborated with the commercial broadcaster Reshet to use the fourth season of the reality singing competition The X Factor Israel to select its entry. The competition concluded with a final on 5 February 2022, which featured four finalists with potential Eurovision songs that were selected for them through a song selection round in January and February 2022. The winner was selected following the combination of the votes from a public vote and two jury groups.

Israel was drawn to compete in the second semi-final of the Eurovision Song Contest which took place on 12 May 2022. Performing during the show in position 2, "I.M" was not announced among the top 10 entries of the second semi-final and therefore did not qualify to compete in the final. It was later revealed that Israel placed 13th out of the 18 participating countries in the semi-final, with 61 points.

== Background ==
Prior to the 2022 contest, Israel has participated in the Eurovision Song Contest forty-three times since its first entry in 1973. Israel has won the contest on four occasions: in 1978 with the song "A-Ba-Ni-Bi" performed by Izhar Cohen and the Alphabeta, in 1979 with the song "Hallelujah" performed by Milk and Honey, in 1998 with the song "Diva" performed by Dana International and in 2018 with the song "Toy" performed by Netta Barzilai. Since the introduction of semi-finals to the format of the Eurovision Song Contest in 2004, Israel has, to this point, managed to qualify to the final eleven times, including three top ten results in 2005 with Shiri Maimon and "Hasheket Shenish'ar" placing fourth, in 2008 with Boaz and "The Fire In Your Eyes" placing ninth, and in 2015 with Nadav Guedj and "Golden Boy" placing ninth, in addition to the victory in 2018. Israel has participated in the final for six consecutive years between 2015 and 2021, which included their 2021 entry "Set Me Free" performed by Eden Alene.

The Israeli national broadcaster, Israeli Public Broadcasting Corporation (IPBC/Kan), has been in charge of the nation's participation in the contest since 2018. Kan confirmed its participation in the 2022 contest on 21 February 2021. Between 2015 and 2020, the Israeli entry was selected through the reality singing competition HaKokhav HaBa L'Eirovizion ("The Next Star for Eurovision") in collaboration with Keshet and Tedy Productions, while in 2021, Kan conducted an internal selection to select the artist that would represent Israel and a national final to select the song for the artist. On 6 April 2021, Kan confirmed that it would cooperate with television channel Reshet 13 to select the Israeli entry for 2022 through the reality singing competition The X Factor Israel.

== Before Eurovision ==
=== The X Factor Israel ===
The Israeli entry for the Eurovision Song Contest 2022 was selected through the fourth season of the reality singing competition The X Factor Israel. The shows were hosted by Liron Weizman and featured a judging panel composed of Margalit Tzan'ani and Miri Mesika (Groups and Over 25's), Aviv Geffen (Girls), Eurovision Song Contest 2018 winner Netta Barzilai (Boys) and Ran Danker (Teens). Franchise creator Simon Cowell was originally announced as a judge, but he withdrew prior to the competition. The competition took place over three months, which commenced on 30 October 2021 and concluded on 5 February 2022. All shows in the competition were broadcast on Channel 13 as well as online via 13tv.co.il.

==== Song selection round ====
On 19 September 2021, Kan opened the public song submission with the deadline on 17 October 2021. Two songs per finalist were chosen from 130 submissions by a six-member professional committee with five members from Kan (four radio representatives and one television representative), among them which included the director of Kan music stations Ofri Gopher, and one from Reshet 13. The eight competing songs were presented on Kan Gimel on 30 January 2022 and the public was able to vote through Kan's official website and mobile application until 3 February 2022. A combination of the votes from the public vote (50%) and two jury groups consisting of The X Factor Israel 2022 judges (25%) and the professional committee (25%) selected one song per finalist to advance to the final, which was revealed during a special televised broadcast titled HaShir Shelanu L'Eirovizion ("Our Song for Eurovision") on Kan 11, Kan Gimel as well as online via kan.org.il on 3 February.

Song selection round – 30 January 2022 – 3 February 2022
Artist	R/O	Song	Songwriter(s)	Jury	Committee	Public	Total	Result
Michael Ben David	1	"I.M"	Chen Aharoni, Lidor Saadia, Asi Tal	25	20	38	83	Advanced
Michael Ben David	2	"Don't"	Ilya Siniaski	0	5	12	17	Eliminated
Eli Huli	3	"Nostalgia"	Roby Fayer, Eli Huli	5	10	18	33	Eliminated
Eli Huli	4	"Blinded Dreamers"	Roby Fayer, Eli Huli	20	15	32	67	Advanced
Inbal Bibi	5	"Marionette"	Tzlil Klifi, Tal Forer, Mai Cohen	15	10	28	53	Advanced
Inbal Bibi	6	"Zaza"	May Sfadia	10	15	22	47	Eliminated
Sapir Saban	7	"Head Up"	Ella Doron, Yahel Doron, Naama Gali Cohen, Liron Lev	0	10	21	31	Eliminated
Sapir Saban	8	"Breaking My Own Walls"	Gal Joe Cohen, Eyal Yishay, Dikla Dori, Ido Dankner	25	15	29	69	Advanced

==== Final ====
The final took place on 5 February 2022 at Menora Mivtachim Arena in Tel Aviv. The winner was selected in two rounds. In the duel round, the four finalists were divided into two duels and each performed a cover song. Two entries progressed forward to the final round, while the two others faced each other off in another duel, which picked the third participant of the final round. In the final round, the three finalists that advanced from the duel round presented their candidate Eurovision entries chosen through the song selection round. The winner was selected by a combination of the votes from a public vote (50%) and two jury groups consisting of The X Factor Israel 2022 judges (25%) and the professional committee (25%).

Qualifier from the two duels Qualifier from the wildcard duel

Duel round – 5 February 2022
Artist	Duel	R/O	Song	Jury	Committee	Public	Total	Result
Inbal Bibi	I	1	"The Winner Takes It All"	5	0	24	29	Duel III
Michael Ben David	I	2	"Shnei Meshug'aim" (שני משוגעים)	20	25	26	71	Advanced
Sapir Saban	II	1	"Badad" (בדד)	5	10	20	35	Duel III
Eli Huli	II	2	"I'll Be There For You"	20	15	30	65	Advanced
Sapir Saban	III	1	"Breaking My Own Walls"	0	15	16	31	Eliminated
Inbal Bibi	III	2	"Marionette"	25	10	34	69	Advanced

Final round – 5 February 2022
Artist	R/O	Song	Jury	Committee	Public	Total	Place
Inbal Bibi	1	"Marionette"	42	44	87	173	3
Michael Ben David	2	"I.M"	50	46	118	214	1
Eli Huli	3	"Blinded Dreamers"	58	60	95	213	2

=== Security ===
On 12 April 2022, Kan stated that due to a strike in the Israeli Ministry of Foreign Affairs which prevents the deployment of security personnel, the Israeli delegation would not be able to travel to Turin for the time being. The following day, Kan stated: "In the coming days, the GSS will make efforts to help find a solution, even though the Ministry of Foreign Affairs staff committee stands its ground and does not intend to help provide the information necessary to regulate security services. Kan would like to thank the GSS for its assistance and hope that a solution to the crisis will be found soon." On 28 April, it was confirmed that a solution was found, in which the delegation would be split into two, with the first group leaving for Turin on 1 May, and the second on 8 May.

=== Preparations ===
Marvin Dietmann, who also worked on the staging for Cyprus, was announced as the artistic director for the Israeli performance. A revamped version of the song was released on 14 March 2022, and was first performed at the Israel Calling pre-party, held in the Menora Mivtachim Arena on 7 April.

== At Eurovision ==
According to Eurovision rules, all nations with the exceptions of the host country and the "Big Five" (France, Germany, Italy, Spain and the United Kingdom) are required to qualify from one of two semi-finals in order to compete for the final; the top ten countries from each semi-final progress to the final. The European Broadcasting Union (EBU) split up the competing countries into six different pots based on voting patterns from previous contests, with countries with favourable voting histories put into the same pot. On 25 January 2022, an allocation draw was held which placed each country into one of the two semi-finals, as well as which half of the show they would perform. Israel has been placed into the second semi-final, to be held on 12 May 2022, and has been scheduled to perform in the first half of the show.

Once all the competing songs for the 2022 contest had been released, the running order for the semi-finals was decided by the shows' producers rather than through another draw, so that similar songs were not placed next to each other. Israel was set to perform in position 2, following the entry from Finland and before the entry from Serbia. The country was not announced as one of the ten qualifiers, marking the first time Israel has failed to qualify since 2014. It was later announced that Israel placed thirteenth in the semi-final with 61 points, 27 of which from the televote and 34 from the professional juries.

=== Voting ===
==== Points awarded to Israel ====
Points awarded to Israel (Semi-final 2)
Score	Televote	Jury
12 points		
10 points	Azerbaijan; Georgia	Australia
8 points		
7 points		Belgium
6 points		
5 points		
4 points		
3 points	Czech Republic	Ireland; Spain; Sweden
2 points	Germany; San Marino	Germany; Malta
1 point		Azerbaijan; Poland; Romania; United Kingdom

==== Points awarded by Israel ====
Points awarded by Israel (Semi-final 2)
Score	Televote	Jury
12 points	Sweden	Sweden
10 points	Czech Republic	Australia
8 points	Serbia	Poland
7 points	Poland	Belgium
6 points	Australia	Czech Republic
5 points	Georgia	Finland
4 points	Estonia	Romania
3 points	Ireland	Estonia
2 points	Romania	Malta
1 point	Belgium	Serbia

Points awarded by Israel (Final)
Score	Televote	Jury
12 points	Ukraine	Sweden
10 points	United Kingdom	United Kingdom
8 points	Spain	Italy
7 points	Serbia	Ukraine
6 points	Moldova	Poland
5 points	Sweden	Australia
4 points	Norway	Belgium
3 points	Italy	Spain
2 points	Netherlands	Czech Republic
1 point	Poland	Netherlands

==== Detailed voting results ====
The following members comprised the Israeli jury:

- Dafna Armoni
- Diana Golbi
- Liron Lev
- Shai Lahav
- Yahel Doron

Detailed voting results from Israel (Semi-final 2)
R/O	Country	Jury							Televote	
R/O	Country	Juror 1	Juror 2	Juror 3	Juror 4	Juror 5	Rank	Points	Rank	Points
01	Finland	9	4	5	9	8	6	5	11	
02	Israel									
03	Serbia	17	11	4	17	16	10	1	3	8
04	Azerbaijan	11	9	12	10	11	12		15	
05	Georgia	13	16	17	11	10	14		6	5
06	Malta	6	10	10	13	6	9	2	14	
07	San Marino	12	12	13	7	15	13		13	
08	Australia	2	1	3	2	3	2	10	5	6
09	Cyprus	16	13	11	16	17	16		12	
10	Ireland	10	14	16	12	14	15		8	3
11	North Macedonia	14	6	14	15	9	11		16	
12	Estonia	7	15	7	5	13	8	3	7	4
13	Romania	8	5	8	8	7	7	4	9	2
14	Poland	4	7	2	3	2	3	8	4	7
15	Montenegro	15	17	15	14	12	17		17	
16	Belgium	3	3	6	4	4	4	7	10	1
17	Sweden	1	2	1	1	1	1	12	1	12
18	Czech Republic	5	8	9	6	5	5	6	2	10

Detailed voting results from Israel (Final)
R/O	Country	Jury							Televote	
R/O	Country	Juror 1	Juror 2	Juror 3	Juror 4	Juror 5	Rank	Points	Rank	Points
01	Czech Republic	8	8	6	15	7	9	2	19	
02	Romania	19	17	15	23	10	19		17	
03	Portugal	11	12	7	12	11	12		14	
04	Finland	9	9	8	14	13	11		13	
05	Switzerland	18	16	21	25	22	21		25	
06	France	20	15	19	16	9	17		15	
07	Norway	14	10	9	7	16	13		7	4
08	Armenia	24	19	18	19	24	22		16	
09	Italy	4	11	1	1	6	3	8	8	3
10	Spain	16	6	17	3	8	8	3	3	8
11	Netherlands	10	20	5	10	17	10	1	9	2
12	Ukraine	13	3	3	6	2	4	7	1	12
13	Germany	7	13	16	20	23	14		21	
14	Lithuania	23	22	24	18	20	23		11	
15	Azerbaijan	12	14	14	21	12	16		23	
16	Belgium	3	4	11	17	14	7	4	22	
17	Greece	17	21	10	9	21	15		20	
18	Iceland	22	23	23	22	25	25		24	
19	Moldova	21	25	25	24	19	24		5	6
20	Sweden	1	2	2	5	1	1	12	6	5
21	Australia	6	7	12	8	4	6	5	18	
22	United Kingdom	2	1	4	2	5	2	10	2	10
23	Poland	5	5	13	4	3	5	6	10	1
24	Serbia	25	24	20	13	18	20		4	7
25	Estonia	15	18	22	11	15	18		12	
