= Michael Ben David =

Israeli singer (born 1996)

Michael Ben David מיכאל בן דוד
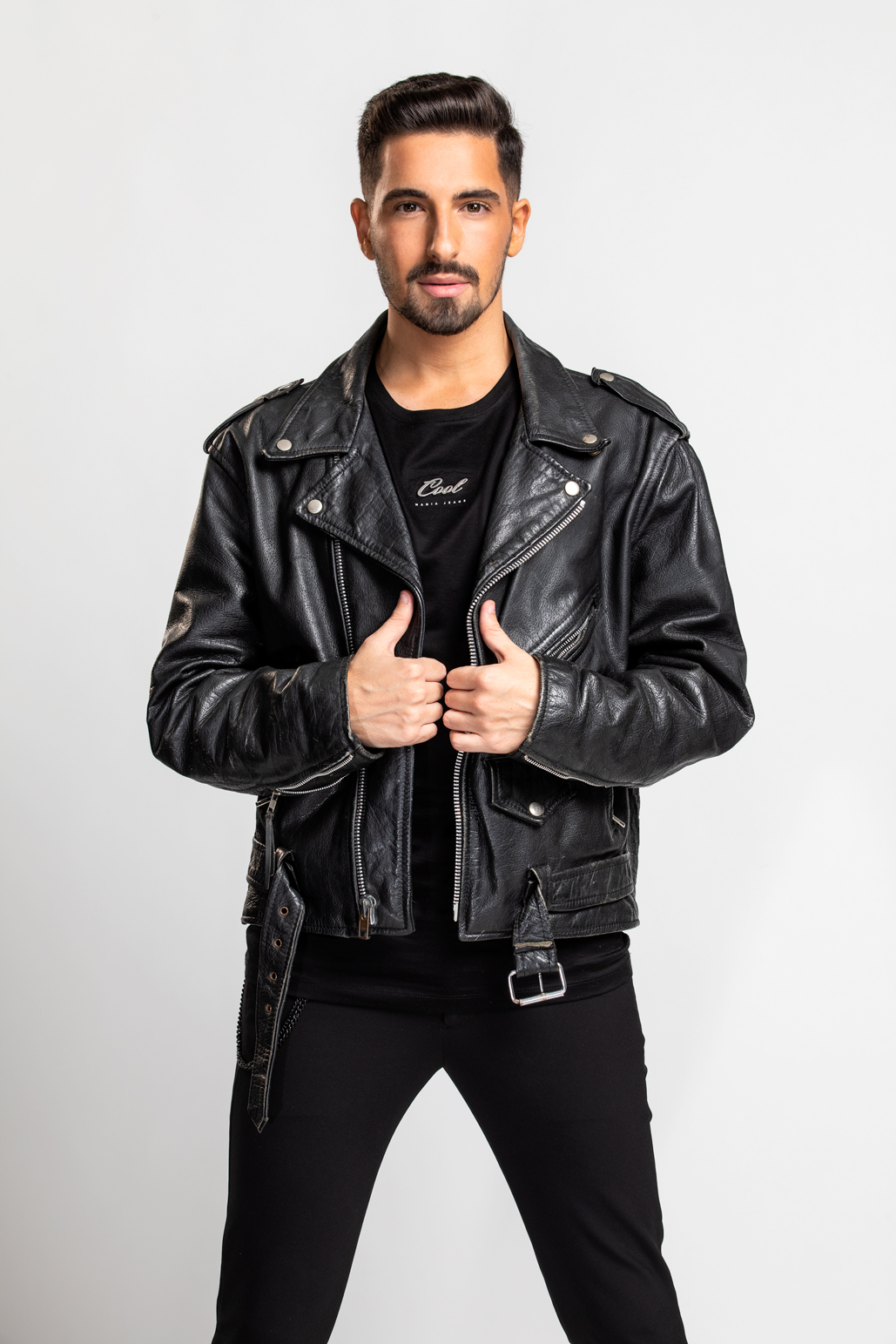
- Ben David in 2022

Background information
- Born: 26 July 1996 (age 30); Ashkelon, Israel
- Genre: Pop
- Occupation: Singer
- Instrument: Vocals
- Years active: 2021–present
- Spouse: Roi Ram (m. 2023)

Michael Ben David (Hebrew: מיכאל בן דוד, IPA: [miχaˈʔel ben daˈvid]; born 26 July 1996) is an Israeli singer who represented his country in the Eurovision Song Contest 2022. He performed the song "I.M" in the second semifinal. Israel placed 13th in the semi-final failing to qualify to the grand Final.

== Life and career ==
Ben David was born in 1996 as the second of six siblings, to a Georgian Jewish father and mother who immigrated to Israel from Kyiv, Ukraine. He started taking voice lessons and studying dance under Israeli choreographer Oz Morag at a young age. He also worked as a singing waiter at a Tel Aviv bar. After completing his mandatory military service he attended the Beit Zvi School of Performing Arts, which has produced a number of former Israeli Eurovision artists like Rita, Shiri Maimon, and Harel Skaat, graduating in 2020. During his time at the school, he acted in plays and musicals.

=== The X Factor Israel and Eurovision 2022 ===
In October 2021, Michael Ben David auditioned for the fourth season of The X Factor Israel, which would be used to select Israel's representative for the Eurovision Song Contest 2022. Following a successful audition, he was paired up with Eurovision winner and Israeli popstar Netta. During the show he performed a number of songs, including ABBA's "Gimme! Gimme! Gimme! (A Man After Midnight)", Billie Eilish's "Idontwannabeyouanymore" and Pet Shop Boy's "It's a Sin". Ben David went on to win the final with his song "I.M" and represented Israel in the Eurovision Song Contest 2022.

The X Factor Israel Performances
	Song	Original Artist
Audition	"Juice"	Lizzo
Audition	"Ima" (אמא)	Miri Mesika
Chairs	"California Dreamin'"	The Mamas & the Papas
Live Shows	"It's a Sin"	Pet Shop Boys
Live Shows	"Emor Shalom" (אמור שלום)	Shokolad, Menta, Mastik
Live Shows	"Etz Yarok MiPlastic" (עץ ירוק מפלסטיק)	Margalit Tzan'ani
Live Shows	"Gadal Li Ktzat Zakan" (גדל לי קצת זקן)	Eden Hason
Live Shows	"Efes Ma'amatz" (אפס מאמץ)	Static & Ben El feat. Netta Barzilai
Live Shows	"Bo'er Bi HaShinuy" (בוער בי השינוי)	Marina Maximilian
Live Shows	"Gimme! Gimme! Gimme! (A Man After Midnight)"	ABBA
Live Shows	"Idontwannabeyouanymore"	Billie Eilish
Song Selection	"I.M"	Michael Ben David
Song Selection	"Don't"	Michael Ben David
Final	"Shnei Meshug'aim" (שני משוגעים)	Omer Adam
Final	"I.M"	Michael Ben David

== Personal life ==
As of 2022, Ben David has been in a relationship with Roi Ram, whom he met while studying at Beit Zvi, for three years. The pair starred in a number of musicals together such as A Thousand and One Nights and King Solomon and Shlomo the Shoemaker, and the farce The Kitchen as well. Ram is still working in the musical theater world, working on a 2022 tour of an adaptation of The Wizard of Oz by L. Frank Baum. On 11 May 2022, the day before his Eurovision Song Contest 2022 semi-final, Ben David announced on Instagram that he had proposed to Ram in Turin, Italy, and that they were now engaged. The couple married on 4 May 2023.

Awards and achievements
Preceded by Eden Alene	The X Factor Israel; 2021–22	Succeeded by TBD
Preceded by Eden Alene with "Set Me Free"	Israel in the Eurovision Song Contest; 2022	Succeeded by Noa Kirel with "Unicorn"
