= Ben Altit =

Israeli basketball player (born 1993)

Ben Altit בן אלטיט
Personal information
- Born: April 4, 1993 (age 33) Herzliya, Israel
- Listed height: 6 ft 10 in (2.08 m)
- Listed weight: 102 kg (225 lb)

Career information
- High school: Rothberg (Tel Aviv, Israel)
- College: Bryant (2011–2012)
- NBA draft: 2015: undrafted
- Playing career: 2012–present
- Position: Center

Career history
- 2012–2013: Bnei Herzliya
- 2013–2015: Maccabi Tel Aviv
- 2014–2015: →Ironi Ramat Gan
- 2015–2016: Maccabi Kiryat Gat
- 2016–2017: Maccabi Ashdod
- 2017–2019: Hapoel Gilboa Galil
- 2019: Ironi Nahariya
- 2019–2020: Hapoel Beer Sheva
- 2020–2021: Elitzur Eito Ashkelon
- 2021–2023: Maccabi Ramat Gan
- 2023–2024: CS Rapid București
- 2025–2026: U-BT Cluj-Napoca

Career highlights
- Romanian League champion (2026); Romanian Cup winner (2026); Romanian Supercup winner (2025); EuroLeague champion (2014); Israeli League champion (2014)

Ben Avi Albert Altit (Hebrew: בן אלטיט; born April 4, 1993) is an Israeli basketball player, who last played for U-BT Cluj-Napoca of the Liga Națională. He played college basketball for Bryant University before playing professionally in Israel.

== Early years ==
Altit was born in Herzliya, Israel, He played for Maccabi Tel Aviv youth team. Altit played college basketball for Bryant University in Smithfield, Rhode Island, In 30 games played during the 2011–12 season, he averaged 4.9 points, 2.6 rebounds and 1.2 blocks per game.

== Professional career ==
Altit started his professional career with Bnei Herzliya in the 2012–13 season, averaging 4.9 points and 1.4 rebounds in 14 Israeli League games.

For the 2013–14, Altit signed with Euroleague squad Maccabi Tel Aviv. He was part of the roster that won the 2013–14 Euroleague. In the 2014–15 season, he was loaned to Ironi Ramat Gan.

In the 2015 offseason, Altit signed with Israeli Premier League newcomer Maccabi Kiryat Gat.

On August 1, 2016, Altit signed with Maccabi Ashdod for the 2016–17 season.

On July 17, 2017, Altit signed with Hapoel Gilboa Galil for the 2017–18 season. On December 4, 2017, Altit recorded a career-high 19 points, shooting 8-of-11 from the field, along with five rebounds in a 99–74 win over Bnei Herzliya. Altit helped Gilboa Galil reach the 2018 Israeli League Playoffs, where they eventually lost to Hapoel Jerusalem.

On July 24, 2018, Altit signed a one-year contract extension with Gilboa Galil. However, on January 21, 2019, Altit parted ways with Gilboa Galil to join Ironi Nahariya for the rest of the season.

On July 25, 2019, Altit signed a one-year deal with Maccabi Rishon LeZion. However, on August 25, 2019, Altit parted ways with Rishon LeZion due to a foot injury. On September 25, 2019, Altit signed with Hapoel Be'er Sheva for the 2019–20 season.

On 2021, Altit participated in the 4th season of The X Factor Israel, as well as his brother Nimrod, in the goal of representing Israel in the Eurovision Song Contest 2022, however, neither of them passed the auditions.

== National team career ==
Altit is a member of the Israeli national basketball team. On November 24, 2017, he made his first appearance for the senior team at the 2019 FIBA Basketball World Cup qualification match against Estonia.

Altit was also a member of the Israeli Under-18 and Under-20 national teams. He also participated at the 2017 Summer Universiade.

== Career statistics ==
Legend
GP	Games played	GS	Games started	MPG	Minutes per game
FG%	Field-goal percentage	3P%	3-point field-goal percentage	FT%	Free-throw percentage
RPG	Rebounds per game	APG	Assists per game	SPG	Steals per game
BPG	Blocks per game	PPG	Points per game	PIR	Performance index rating
**Bold**	Career high

=== EuroLeague ===
†	Denotes seasons in which Altit won the EuroLeague

Year	Team	GP	GS	MPG	FG%	3P%	FT%	RPG	APG	SPG	BPG	PPG	PIR
2013–14†	Maccabi	3	1	1.7	.000	—	—	—	—	—	.3	0.0	-0.3
2014–15	Maccabi	1	0	1.0	—	—	—	—	—	—	—	0.0	0.0
Career		4	0	1.3	.000	—	—	—	—	—	.3	0.0	-0.3
