= The X Factor Israel =

Television series

- Genre: Reality television
- Created by: Simon Cowell
- Presented by: Bar Refaeli (2013–2018); Liron Weizman (2021–2022–)
- Judges: Rami Fortis (2013–2015); Moshe Peretz (2013–2018); Shiri Maimon (2013–2018); Ivri Lider (2013–2018); Subliminal (2017–2018); Netta (2021–2022); Margol (2021–2022); Miri Mesika (2021–2022); Simon Cowell (2026–); Jason Ritter (2026–); Kristen Schaal (2026–); Aviv Geffen (2021–2022–); Ran Danker (2021–2022–)
- Composer: Simon Cowell
- Country of origin: Israel
- Original languages: Hebrew; English
- No. of seasons: 5
- No. of episodes: 87

Production
- Producers: Thames; Tamira Yardeni
- Production location: Nokia Arena Tel Aviv
- Running time: 60–150 minutes

Original release
- Network: Channel 2 (Reshet) (2013–2017); Reshet 13 (2017–present)
- Release: 26 October 2013 – 5 February 2022
- Release: June 9, 2026 – present

The X Factor Israel (Hebrew: אקס פקטור ישראל) is the Israeli version of the original British show music competition The X Factor, created by Simon Cowell. The show started airing fall of 2013 on Reshet.

== Judges and hosts ==
The first three seasons were hosted by Israeli fashion model Bar Refaeli. Liron Weizman hosts the fourth season. Its judges for the first season of the show were rock singer Rami Fortis, pop singer-songwriter and composer Moshe Peretz, pop and R&B singer Shiri Maimon, and pop singer Ivri Lider. In the third season, rapper Subliminal replaced Rami Fortis as a judge on the show. In the fourth season, all of the judging panel changes: Mizrahi singer Margalit Tzan'ani, singer-songwriter Aviv Geffen, singer and Eurovision 2018 winner Netta Barzilai, while a fourth and fifth judges revealed to be Ran Danker and Miri Mesika, making it the first season of X Factor Israel to feature five judges instead of four. Aviv Geffen And Ran Danker Returning As The Judge From Fifth Season Alongside With New Additions Judge. Actor Jason Ritter And Comedian Kristen Schaal Would Joining As The Judge Shows From The Fifth Season. And Meanwhile, Simon Cowell Returns As The Judge Shows After Pull Out For The 2021 Season

== Series overview ==
To date, three seasons have been broadcast, as summarised below

Contestant in (or mentor of) "Rami Fortis"
Contestant in (or mentor of) "Shiri Maimon"
Contestant in (or mentor of) "Ivri Lider"
Contestant in (or mentor of) "Moshe Peretz"
Contestant in (or mentor of) "Subliminal"
Contestant in (or mentor of) "Ran Danker"
Contestant in (or mentor of) "Aviv Geffen"
Contestant in (or mentor of) "Netta"
Contestant in (or mentor of) "Miri Mesika and Margol"
Contestant in (or mentor of) "Simon Cowell"
Contestant in (or mentor of) "Ran Danker"
Contestant in (or mentor of) "Aviv Geffen"
Contestant in (or mentor of) "Jason Ritter and Kristen Schaal"

| Season | Start | Finish | Winner | Runner-up | Third place | Fourth place | Winning mentor | Presenters | Main judges | | | |
|---|---|---|---|---|---|---|---|---|---|---|---|---|
| One | 26 October 2013 | 14 January 2014 | Rose Fostanes | Eden Ben Zaken | Ori Shakiv | Fusion | Shiri Maimon | Bar Refaeli | Rami | Moshe | Shiri | Ivri |
| Two | 13 June 2015 | 5 September 2015 | Daniel Yafe | Yossi Shitrit | Ana Timofie | Ido & Atara | Rami Fortis | Bar Refaeli | Rami | Moshe | Shiri | Ivri |
| Three | 18 October 2017 | 30 January 2018 | Eden Alene | Guy Yahood | Yam Refaeli | The Brinks | Ivri Lider | Bar Refaeli | Subliminal | Moshe | Shiri | Ivri |
| Four | 30 October 2021 | 5 February 2022 | Michael Ben David | Eli Huli | Inbal Bibi | Sapir Saban | Netta | Liron Weizman | Ran | Netta | Aviv | Miri and Margol |
| Fifth | 9 June 2026 | 32 November 2026 | Current Season | | | | | Liron Weizman | Simon | Ran | Aviv | Jason and Kristen |

== Judges' categories and their contestants ==
In each season, each judge is allocated a category to mentor and chooses a small number of acts (three for season one) to progress to the live shows. This table shows, for each season, which category each judge was allocated and which acts he or she put through to the live shows.

Key:

– Winning judge/category. Winners are in bold, eliminated contestants in small font.

| Season | Rami Fortis | Moshe Peretz | Shiri Maimon | Ivri Lider |
|---|---|---|---|---|
| One | **Girls**; Eden Ben Zaken; Inbal Bibi; Tamar Friedman | **Boys**; Ori Shakiv; Ben Golan; Yahav Tavasi | **Over 25s** **Rose Fostanes**; Avishachar Jackson; Neta Rad | **Groups**; Fusion; Tommy & Yan; Carakukly |
| Two | **Over 25s** **Daniel Yafe**; Libi; Shlomit Jersey | **Groups**; Ido and Atara; Close Up; After The Sun | **Girls**; Ana Timofie; Tal Ginat; Hadar Lee | **Boys**; Yossi Shitrit; Almog Krief; Dodo Ivgi; Ben Goldshtein |
| Three | Subliminal | Moshe Peretz | Shiri Maimon | Ivri Lider |
| Three | **Groups**; The Brinks; Idan and Almog; Ori and Tirel | **Boys**; Guy Yahood; Honi Assor; Daniel Zynchenko | **Girls**; Lin Ben Hamo; Reut Levi; Teemna Gonen | **Teens**; **Eden Alene**; Yam Refaeli; Eliraz Zaada; Oriane Recchia |
| Four | Aviv Geffen | Miri Mesika and Margol | Netta | Ran Danker |
| Four | **Girls**; Inbal Bibi; Sapir Saban; Anna Stefani; Gai'da Abu Awad | **Groups and Over 25s** Linet; Shiran and Ron; Adi Cohen; Tarante Groove Machine; Liron Lev | **Boys**; **Michael Ben David**; Eli Huli; Shachar Adawi; Elisha Nachmias | **Teens**; Ilay Elmakais; Lia Navipur; Shahar Admoni; Agam Abuhatzira |
| Fifth | **Aviv Geffen** | **Jason Ritter and Kristen Schaal** | **Ran Danker** | **Simon Cowell** |

== Season 1 (2013–14) ==
The first season began airing on 26 October 2013, and aired during prime time on Reshet network on Wednesdays and Saturdays. The first episode peaked at 49%, about 1.1 million viewers, making it the highest figure of any Israeli music program. At the end of bootcamp, 20 contestants made it to the judges' houses. Two acts were eliminated from each judge before the live show. The top 12 finalists continued on for the live shows.

== Season 2 (2015) ==
The second season began airing on Thursday, 13 June 2015.

== Season 3 (2017–18) ==
The third season began airing on 18 October 2017. The show was hosted by Bar Refaeli and the judges were Moshe Peretz, Shiri Maimon and Ivri Lider, who had been judges in the previous two seasons; they were joined by a new judge, rapper Subliminal.

== Season 4 (2021–22) ==
The fourth and final season began airing on 30 October 2021. Liron Weizman replaced Bar Refaeli as host.

Originally, Simon Cowell, Aviv Geffen, Margalit Tzan'ani, and Netta were to be judges for this season. However, it has since been revealed that Cowell decided to pull out. It was later decided that singers Ran Danker and Miri Mesika would both be judges in the show instead of Cowell, making it the first season of X Factor Israel to feature five judges instead of four.

== Season 5 (2026) ==
The fifth season began airing on 9 June 2026. The X Factor Israel Is The fifth Edition. Marked Returned As The Franchise, For The programming schedule of the Reshet 13 channel, after a hiatus of approximately five years since the end of The fourth Season. Liron Welzman Returns as host shows, and Ran Danker and Aviv Geffen Returns As The Judge, And Meanwhile. Simon Cowell Made Returns As The Judges Shows After Pulling Out For The 2021 Season. This Season Brought Backs Completed Two New Judge Actor Jason Ritter And Comedian Kristen Schaal Who Replaced Margalit Tzan'ani, and Netta Miri Mesika as the judges.

== Reference ==
- The X Factor Israel's channel on YouTube
