= MTV Europe Music Award for Best Israeli Act =

MTV Music Awards for Best Israeli Act winners and nominees

The following is a list of the MTV Europe Music Award winners and nominees for Best Israeli Act.

== Winners and nominees ==
Winners are listed first and highlighted in bold.

=== 1990s ===
Year	Artist	Ref
1994	**Rita^{[a]}**	

=== 2000s ===
Year	Artist	Ref
2008
2008	**Shiri Maimon**	
2008	Asaf Avidan	
2008	Cohen@Mushon	
2008	Izabo	
2008	Kutiman	
2009
2009	**Ninet Tayeb**	
2009	Asaf Avidan & the Mojos	
2009	Assaf Amdursky	
2009	Infected Mushroom	
2009	Terry Poison	

=== 2010s ===
Year	Artist	Ref
2010
2010	**Ivri Lider**	
2010	Hadag Nahash	
2010	Infected Mushroom	
2010	Karolina	
2010	Sarit Hadad	
2011
2011	**The Young Professionals**	
2011	Izabo	
2011	Liran Danino	
2011	Sarit Hadad	
2011	Gilad Kahana & Ninet Tayeb	
2012
2012	**Ninet Tayeb**	
2012	Dudu Tassa	
2012	Moshe Peretz	
2012	Riff Cohen	
2012	The Young Professionals	
2013
2013	**The Ultras**	
2013	Ester Rada	
2013	Hadag Nahash	
2013	Ido B Zooki	
2013	Roni Daloomi	
2014
2014	**TripL featuring Meital de Razon**	
2014	Dudu Tassa	
2014	Eliad	
2014	E-Z	
2014	Ido B Zooki	
2015
2015	**Eliad**	
2015	Café Shahor Hazak	
2015	Eden Ben Zaken	
2015	E-Z	
2015	Guy & Yahel	
2016
2016	**The Ultras**	
2016	Static and Ben El Tavori	
2016	Noa Kirel	
2016	E-Z	
2016	Eliad	
2017
2017	**Noa Kirel**	
2017	Ania Bukstein	
2017	Nechi Nech	
2017	Static & Ben El Tavori	
2017	Stephane Legar	
2018
2018	**Noa Kirel**	
2018	Nadav Guedj	
2018	Anna Zak	
2018	Stephane Legar	
2018	Peled	

=== 2020s ===
Year	Artist	Ref
2020
2020	**Noa Kirel**	
2020	Carakukly	
2020	Eden Hason	
2020	Noga Erez	
2020	Noroz and Boi Ecchi	
2021
2021	**Noa Kirel**	
2021	Eden Ben Zaken	
2021	Eden Derso	
2021	Jasmin Moallem	
2021	Noga Erez	
2022
2022	**Noa Kirel**	
2022	Anna Zak	
2022	Mergui	
2022	Nunu	
2022	Shahar Saul	
2023
2023	**No winner**	
2023	Anna Zak	
2023	Liad Meir	
2023	Noa Kirel	
2023	Nunu	
2023	Shira Margalit	
2024
2024	**Noa Kirel**	
2024	Anna Zak	
2024	Agam Buhbut	
2024	Shahar Saul	
2024	Shahar Tavoch	

^{^[a]}Local Hero Award
