= Nunu (singer) =

Israeli performer

Nunu נונו
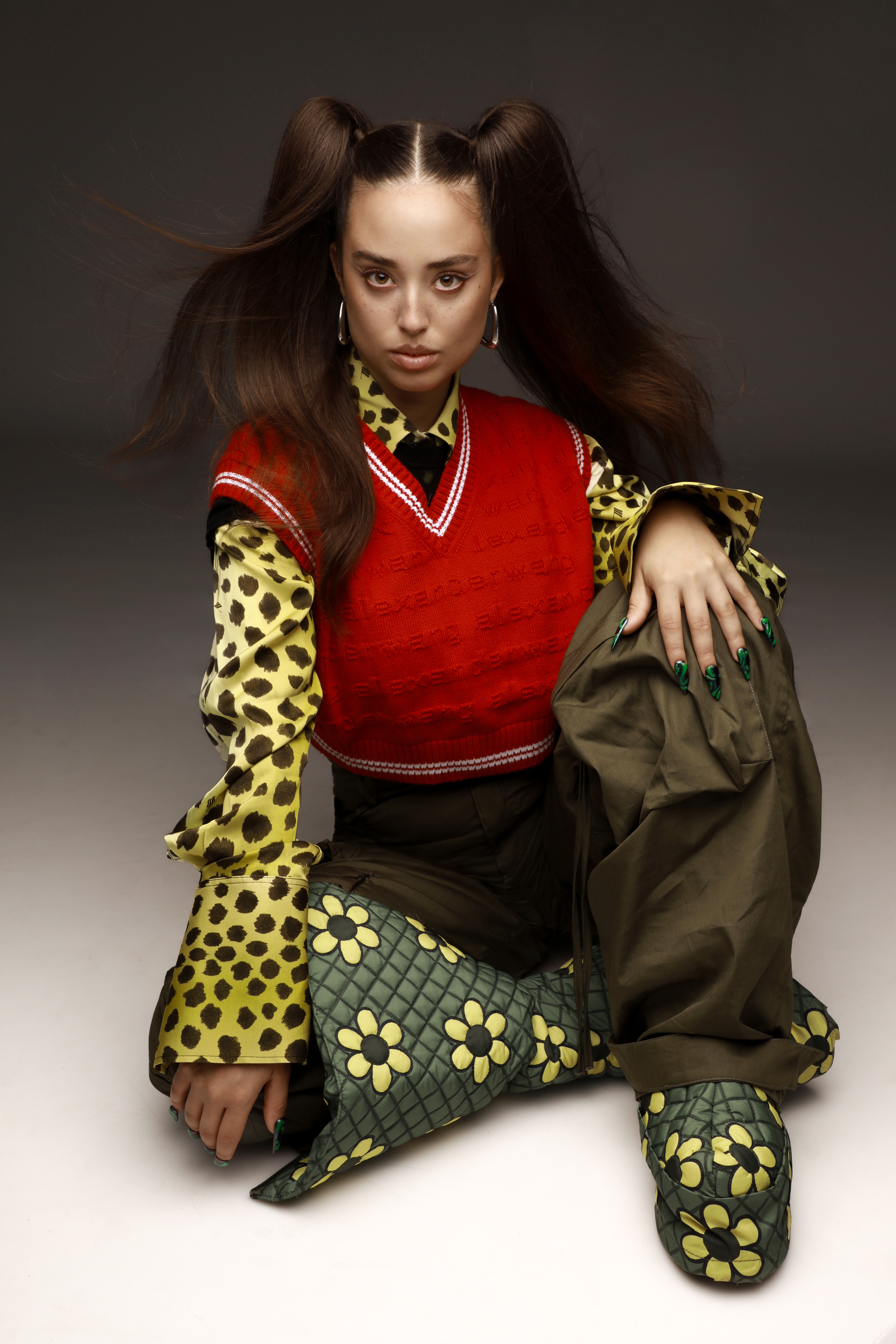

Background information
- Born: Neomi Aharoni-Gal; 7 September 1998 (age 28); Tel Aviv, Israel
- Genre: Hyperpop
- Years active: 2021-present

Neomi Aharoni-Gal (Hebrew: נעמי אהרוני-גל; born 7 September 1998), known by her stage name Nunu (Hebrew: נונו), is an Israeli singer.

== Biography ==
Aharoni-Gal was born and raised in the Kerem Ha Teimanim neighborhood in Tel Aviv, Israel, to Michal and Doron Aharoni. When she was younger, she attended Herzliya Hebrew Gymnasium and Highschool Alef of Arts in Tel Aviv. She was enlisted into the IDF and served as a jazz singer, studying a course that combines studies for honorary music students at Rimon Music School along with army service in a military band.

=== Career ===
On 21 June 2021, Nunu released her first single "Banim" (Boys). Half a year later, on 7 December, she released her single "Living the Dream".

On 12 January 2022, Nunu released a cover version to the song "Adoni" along with Roni Duani. On 10 May of that year she and Duani opened for Maroon 5's second performance at Yarkon Park in Tel Aviv. A few days later, she released her single "Shuz".

On 6 June 2022, Nunu released her single "Cute Boy" in honor of Pride Month in collaboration with the LGBT party line "Forever".

On 18 July 2022, Nunu released her debut album "Status".

On 7 September 2022, Nunu was awarded the ACUM Prize in the Discovery of the Year category.

In September 2022, the satirical TV show Eretz Nehederet featured an impersonation of her performed by Shani Cohen. In the sketch, she sang alongside impersonations of singers Noa Kirel and Anna Zak, whom the Mako website referred to as "The three biggest pop queens in Israel".

In October 2022, she was announced as a first-time nominee for the 2022 MTV Europe Music Award for Best Israeli Act.

In 2023, Forbes Israel named her one of the 30 most promising young Israelis.

On 4 March 2025, she released the album "Ma Hutz Mizeh" ("What else besides that"), co-produced by herself and Gal Oved.

== Discography ==
=== Studio albums ===
- 2022: Status
- 2025: Ma Hutz Mizeh ("What else besides that")
- 2026: Haganuz ("Shelved")

=== Mini-albums ===
- 2022: Nunu Rmx - EP
- 2022: Live Performances at Mifal HaPais - EP

=== Singles ===
Song	Year	Top ranks		
Song	Year	Media Forest	Galgalatz	Top Ten Chart
"Banim" (Boys)	2021	—	—	—
"Ohev Lo Ohev" (Loves, Don't Love)	2021	—	—	—
"Living the Dream"	2021	—	3	4
"Goliath 2"	2022	—	—	—
"Shuz"	2022	—	—	—
"Cute Boy" (with Sagi Kariv and Forever Tel Aviv)	2022	4	2	1
"S'il Vous Plaîs"	2022	—	—	—

== Filmography ==
=== Music videos ===
Song	Year	Director	Views(As of May 2026; Hundred of thousands)	Source
"Banim"	2021	Adam Gabay	8.90	
"Ohev Lo Ohev"	2021	Adam Gabay	2.34	
"Living The Dream"	2021	Adam Gabay, Nunu and Barak Surian	55.2	
"Goliath 2"	2022	Adam Gabay and Nunu	12.6	
"Shuz"	2022	Adam Gabay, Ilai Ashdot and Nunu	2.58	
"Cute Boy"	2022	Adam Gabay, Nunu	17.6	
"Ma Hutz Mizeh"	2025	Adam Gabay, Nunu	0.68	
