= Linet =

Turkish-Israeli singer (born 1975)

- Born: Linet Mor Menashe; 5 March 1975 (age 51); Kfar Saba, Israel
- Genres: Pop, arabesque, fantezi
- Occupations: Singer
- Years active: 1985–present

Linet Mor Menashe (Turkish: Linet Menaşi, Hebrew: לינט מנשה, born 5 March 1975) is an Israeli-born Turkish-Jewish singer, best known for her performances of arabesque and pop music. She is well known in Turkey, Israel, and the Middle East, mostly thanks to her grasp overmultiple languages (specifically Turkish, Hebrew, Arabic, Greek, Spanish, and English).

== Biography ==
Linet was born and raised in Israel. Her family had emigrated from Spain in the 15th century to the Ottoman Empire, like most Sephardic Jews, following the 1492 Alhambra decree, which exiled all Jews from Iberia. Her mother, Leyla Özgecan (also known as Leya Bonana, Hebrew: לילה), was a Turkish classical music singer from Bursa. Her father, Shmuel Menashe, was a resident of Istanbul. Both of her parents are Turkish-Jews. She has two sisters. On 18 March 2022, Linet's mother, Leyla Özgecan, died.

Despite reports that she had served in the Israeli Army for 3 months, Linet stated in 2021 that she never served in the military, after which she became a resident in Turkey.

Linet currently resides at Ataşehir, Istanbul.

== Career ==
Linet started her career singing together with her mother in events when she was as young as 5, and released her first single at the age of 16.

In 1993, she participated in the Kdam Eurovision for winning a chance to represent Israel in the Eurovision Song Contest 1993 with the song "Aniana" (Hebrew: אני אנא) but was placed tenth. She released her first album in Turkey in 1995. Linet met Orhan Gencebay when she was 17 years old and released an album consisting of Gencebay's songs. She earned two gold certifications with this album.

Linet returned to live in Israel between 1999 and 2006, where apart from recording albums in Hebrew, she opened a candy store. Besides Turkish and Hebrew, she has recorded songs in Arabic, Greek, Spanish, and English as well.

After an absence of two years in the Turkish music scene, she returned with a completely new look, performing as a guest at the İbo Show. Linet had been mentioned among the candidates to participate in the 2021 season of The X Factor Israel, which selects the Israeli representative to the Eurovision Song Contest 2022 held in Italy. She was eliminated in the quarter-finals.

In August 2021, Linet performed together with the Jerusalem Orchestra East&West at the Arabesque Festival held in the city of Akko, and also recorded Yalnız değilsin/חומות חימר ("You are not alone"/"Walls of Clay"), a song dedicated to women facing oppression around the world. The song was recorded in Arabic, Hebrew and Turkish.

== Discography ==
=== Albums ===
* Flags indicate the country in which the album was primarily released.

1. Birlikte Söyleyelim / שירו איתנו (Israel)
2. Para Para / כסף הכסף (Israel)
3. Hayatın Çiçeği, Anne / פרח החיים ,אמא (Israel)
4. Et Libi Koveş / את ליבי כובש (Israel)
5. Linet (1995) (Turkey)
6. Linet'in Müzik Kutusu (1997) (Turkey)
7. Ölümsüz Aşk (1999) (Turkey)
8. אישה אחרת / Different Woman (2003) (Israel)
9. Layla (2004) (Israel)
10. Paylaşmak İstiyorum (2009) (Turkey)
11. Kalbimin Sahibi Sen (2011) (Turkey)
12. Yorum Farkı (2012) (Turkey)
13. Yorum Farkı II (2015) (Turkey)
14. Bilir misin? (2018) (Turkey)
15. המלכה מאיסטנבול / İstanbul'un Kraliçesi (Live) (2025) (Israel)

=== EPs ===
1. שמש בודדה / Yalnız Güneş (2023) (Israel)
2. Anlat (2024) (Turkey)

=== Singles ===
1. Yatsın Yanıma (2020) (Turkey)
2. חומות חימר / Yalnız Değilsin (2021) (Israel)
3. Ne Ağladım (2022) (Turkey)
4. סופים מאושרים / Mutlu Sonlar (2022) (Israel)
5. תשמור לי גם עליך / Kendine İyi Davran (2022) (Israel)
6. שני ילדים / İki Çocuk (2023) (Israel)
7. תסתכלו עליי / Beni Seyredin (2023) (Israel)
8. Al Gece Yarılarımı Benden (2024) (Turkey)
9. İçim Yanar Tenim Üşür (Selami Şahin Şarkıları 2) (2024) (Turkey)
10. Dön (40 Yıl) (2024) (Turkey)
11. Bulunur Elbet (2026) (Turkey)

=== Music videos ===
- Çocuksun Sen Daha
- Çaresizim
- Şeytan Diyor Ki
- Ölümsüz Aşk Bu
- Kim Özler
- O Kim Oluyor
- Aşk Ordusu
- Aslan Gibiyim
- Sözümden Dönmem
- Sürünüyorum
- Şu Saniye
- Adını Sen Koy
- Resim
- İncir
- Geçer
- Aman Aman
- Kandıra Kandıra
- Hikâye
- İhtimal
- Yatsın Yanıma
- Ne Ağladım
- Bulunur Elbet

== Awards ==
Year	Award	Category
2013	12th Magazinci.com Internet Media Awards (The Best)	Best Fantezi Musician
2015	Turkish Music Friends of Hearts Association Awards	Best Performing Artist of Turkish Music (Golden Microphone)
2016	MGD 22nd Golden Objective Awards	Best Album (Yorum Farkı II)
2016	7th Quality of Magazine Awards	Best Female Singer
