= Ido B Zooki =

Israeli musical duo

Ido B Zooki עידו בי וצוקי
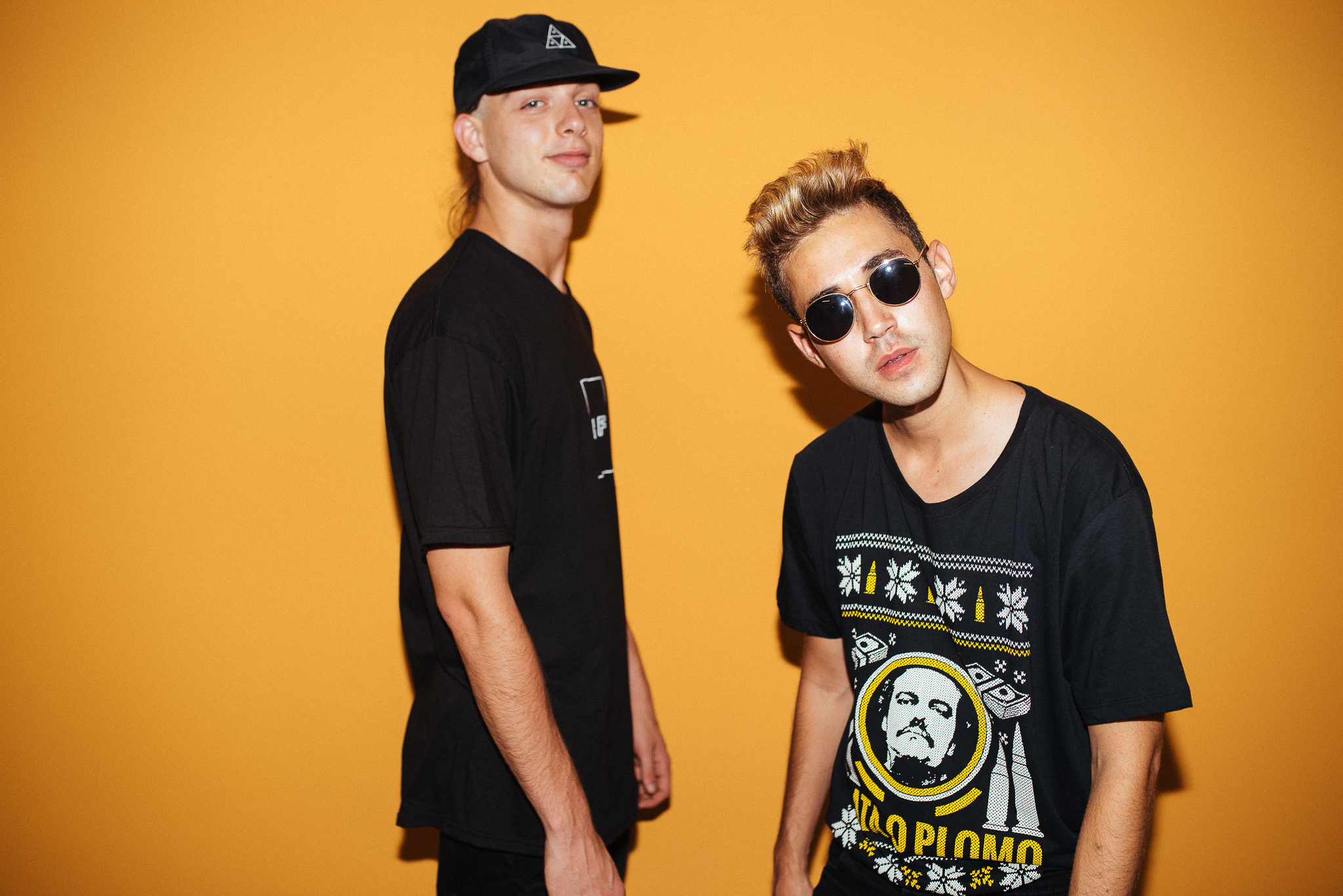

Background information
- Born: Modi'in, Israel
- Origin: Israel
- Genres: Hip hop; hardstyle; trance; folk
- Occupations: Record producers; DJs; singers
- Years active: 2009-2022
- Past members: Ido Ben Dov; Zook Algasi
- Website: https://www.idobzooki.co.il

Ido B & Zooki (Hebrew: עידו בי וצוקי) was an Israeli hip-hop/EDM duo from Tel Aviv, the joint project of Ido Ben Dov (Ido B) and Zook Algasi (Zooki).

== Biography ==
Dov and Algasi grew up in Modi'in, Israel. They studied together until high school.

== Music career ==
They began their careers in 2009 performing in clubs around Israel and accumulated a large fan base by releasing songs in various genres produced using Cubase and Ableton Live.

In 2013 was their breakout year which saw them nominated for the MTV Europe Music Award for Best Israeli Act.

In 2014 they were considered one of Israel's 'hottest' groups in the electronic music scene among young audiences.

In 2021, they participated in the fourth season of The X Factor Israel, with the goal of representing Israel in the Eurovision Song Contest 2022. They were eliminated in the chairs round.

In 2022, the two announced the breakup of the duo. In June 2023, Ido B co-released the song "Roulette." In late September 2023, Ido B co-released the song "Van Gogh." In late October 2023, Ido B released "Malachim" to commemorate those murdered and to tell the stories of the victims of the Nova music festival massacre.

== Discography ==
- Collection I (2016)
- Collection II (2016)
- Drops (2017)
