= The X Factor Israel season 3 =

The X Factor Israel
- Season 3
- Hosted by: Bar Refaeli
- Judges: Subliminal; Moshe Peretz; Shiri Maimon; Ivri Lider
- Winner: Eden Alene
- Runner-up: Guy Yahood

Release
- Original network: Reshet 13
- Original release: October 18, 2017 – January 30, 2018

Season chronology
- ← Previous; Season 2 Next → Season 4

The X Factor Israel is the Israeli version of the British television music competition The X Factor. The third season started its run on Thursday, October 18, 2017 on Reshet network's Channel 2 and aired in prime time. From October 18th, 2017 to January 30th 2018, it was aired on Reshet 13.

== Judges and hosts ==
Israeli fashion model Bar Refaeli hosted the third season. Contrary to most other versions of the X Factor where the judges panels was a mixture of singers and music industry figures, the Israeli version was composed entirely of musicians. The judges panel for the first season was composed of the rock singer Rami Fortis, the pop singer-songwriter and composer Moshe Peretz, the pop and R&B singer Shiri Maimon, and the pop singer Ivri Lider. Fortis forfeited the judging role, and got replaced by the Israeli rapper Subliminal.

== Contestants ==
Key:

– Winner
– Runner-up
– Third Place

Categories	Acts			
Boys (Peretz)	Guy Yahood	Honi Assor	Daniel Zychenko	–
Groups (Subliminal)	The Brinx	Idan and Almog	Ori and Tirel	–
Girls (Maimon)	Lin Ben Hamo	Timmna Gonen	Reut Levi	–
13-19s (Lider)	Yam Refaeli	Eliraz Zaada	Eden Alene	Oriane Recchia

== Judges Houses ==
Judge	Category	Assistant	Contestants eliminated
Lider	Teens	Yarden "Jordi" Peleg	Ayala Sinai, Oriane Recchia
Maimon	Girls	Magi Azarzar	Tohar Kadosh, Revital Zaltzman
Subliminal	Groups	The Ultras	Solenopsis Invicta, Pancho & Karma
Peretz	Boys	Hanan Ben Ari	Ofek Ha'Mal'Ach (The Angel), Lior Azulay

Season 3 judges and host

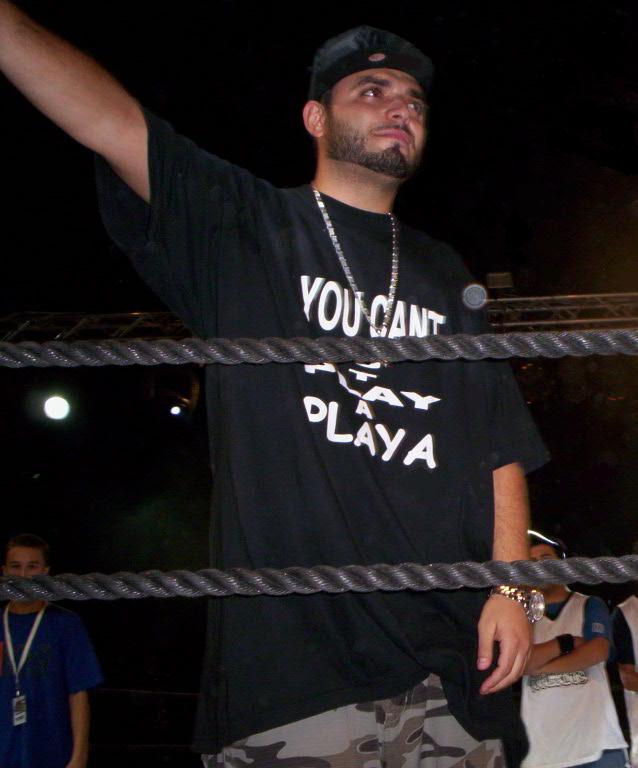
Subliminal

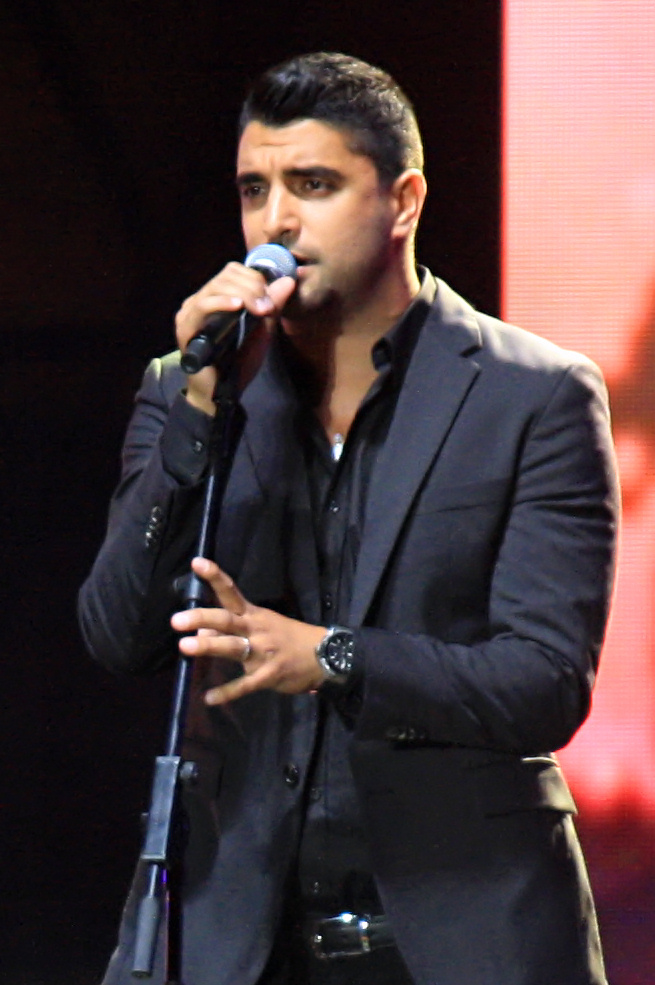
Moshe Peretz

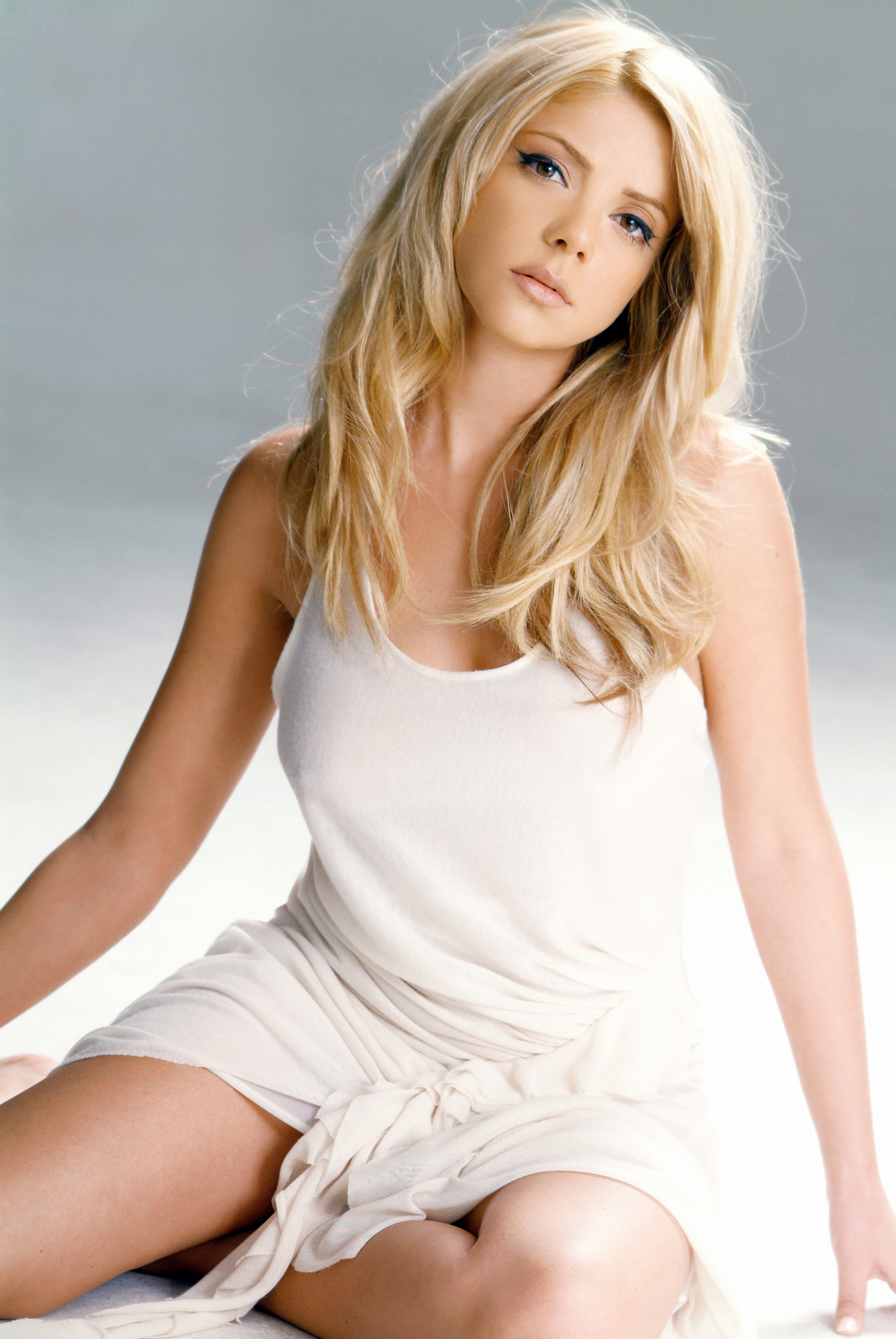
Shiri Maimon

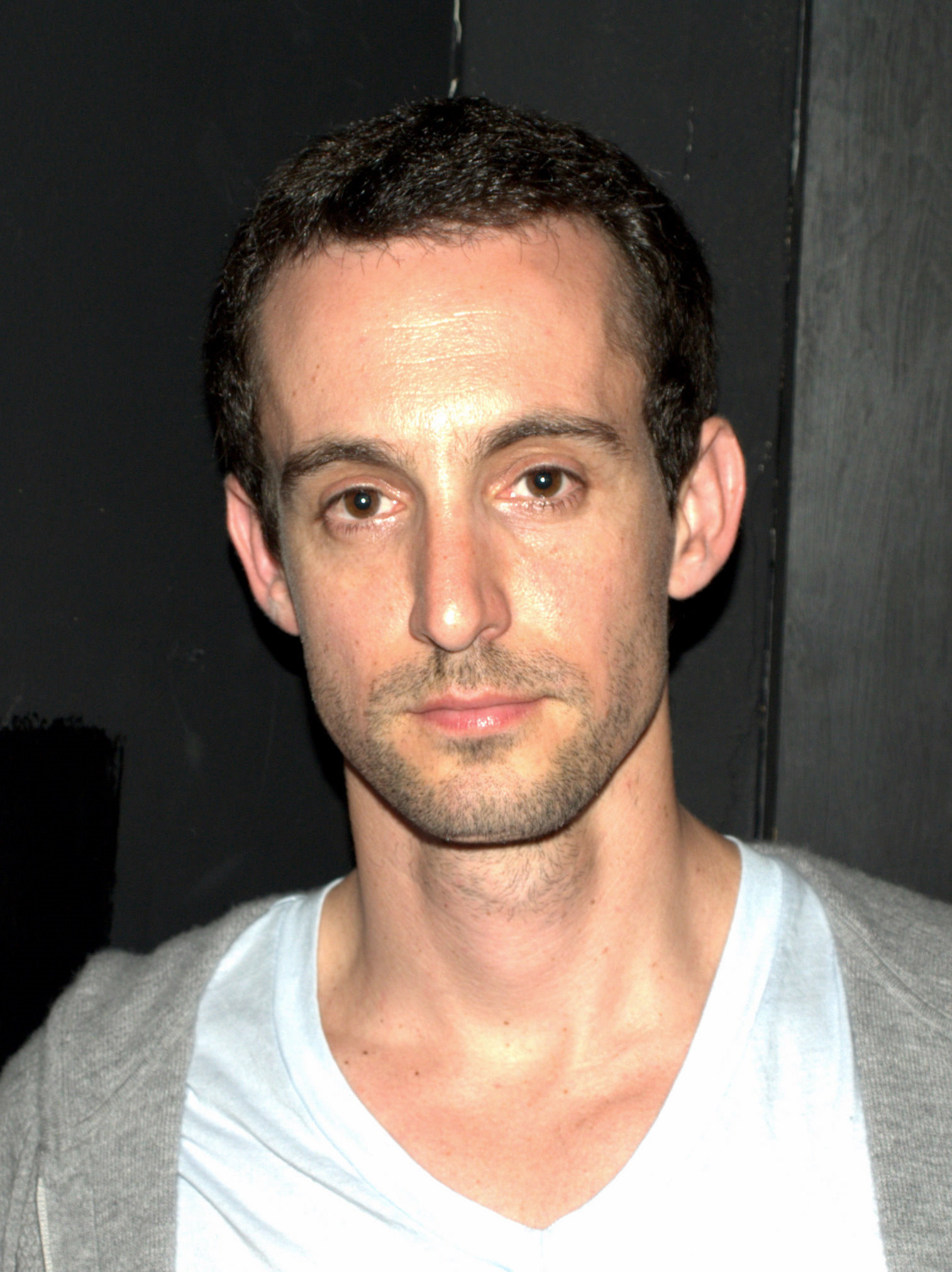
Ivri Lider

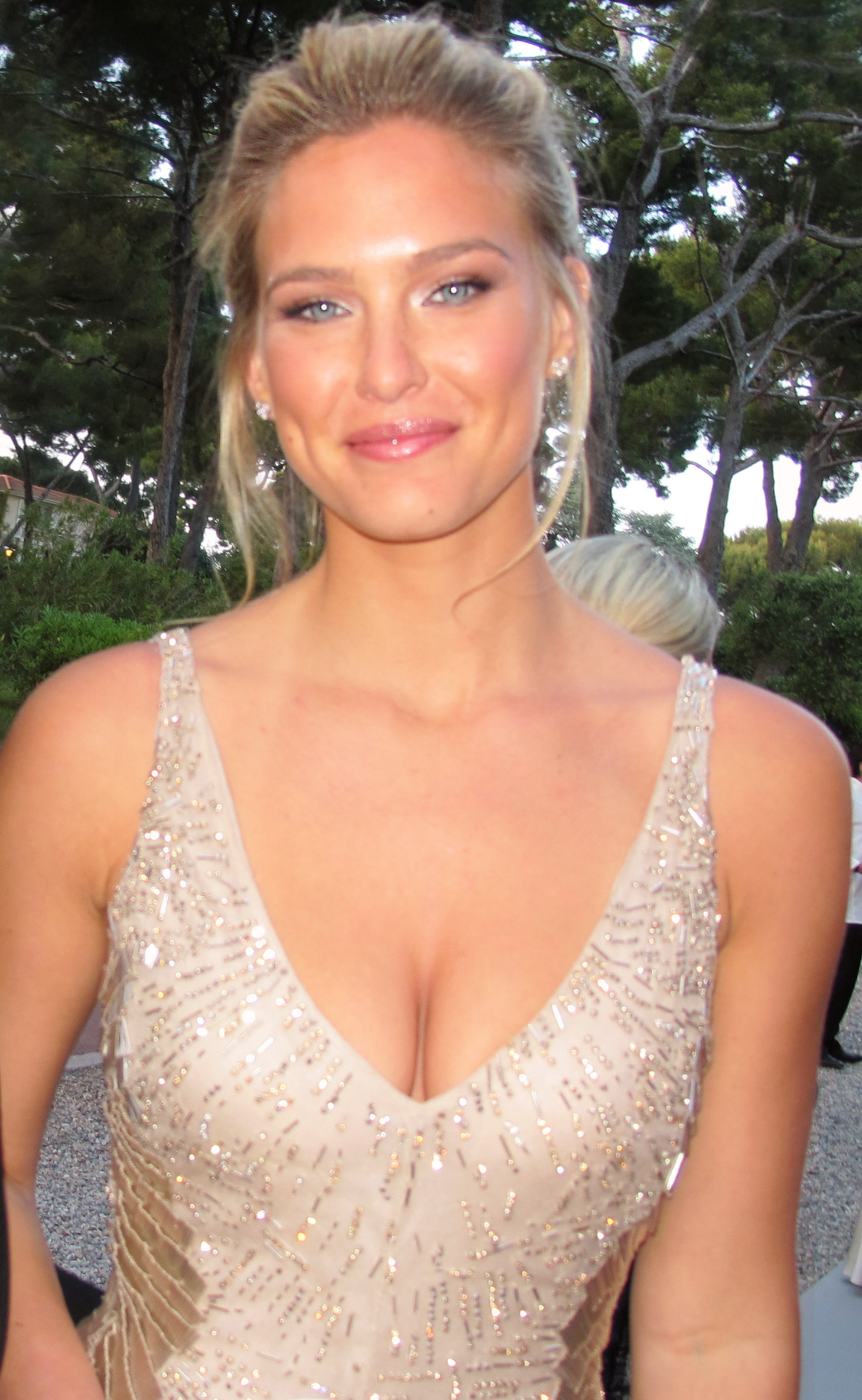
Bar Refaeli

=== Results summary ===
Color key

–	Contestant was in the bottom two/three; contestant had to sing again in the final showdown
–	Contestant was in the bottom two/three; received the fewest votes and was immediately eliminated
–	Contestant received the fewest votes and was immediately eliminated (no final showdown)

Weekly results per contestant
Contestant	Week 1		Week 2		Week 3			
Contestant	Wednesday	Saturday	Wednesday	Saturday	Sunday	Tuesday Round 1	Tuesday Round 2	Tuesday Round 3
Eden Alene	Safe	Safe	Safe	Safe	Safe	Safe	Safe	Winner
Guy Yahood	Safe	Safe	Safe	Safe	Safe	Safe	Safe	Runner-up
Yam Refaeli	Safe	Safe	Safe	Safe	Safe	Safe	3rd	Eliminated (week 3, Tuesday Round 2)
The Brinks	Safe	Safe	Safe	Bottom three	Safe	4th	Eliminated (week 3, Tuesday Round 1)	
Eliraz Zaada	Safe	Safe	Safe	Safe	5th	Eliminated (week 3, Sunday)		
Oriane Recchia	Safe	Safe	Safe	Bottom three	Eliminated (week 2, Thursday)			
Lin Ben Hamo	Safe	Safe	Bottom three	7th	Eliminated (week 2, Thursday)			
Reut Levi	Safe	Bottom three	Bottom three	Eliminated (week 2, Sunday)				
Teemna Gonen	Bottom three	Safe	9th	Eliminated (week 2, Sunday)				
Honi Assor	Safe	Bottom three	Eliminated (week 1, Thursday)					
Idan and Almog	Safe	11th	Eliminated (week 1, Thursday)					
Ori and Tirel	Bottom three	Eliminated (week 1, Sunday)						
Daniel Zenizko	13th	Eliminated (week 1, Sunday)						
