= Eden Ben Zaken =

Israeli singer (born 1994)

Eden Ben Zaken עדן בן זקן
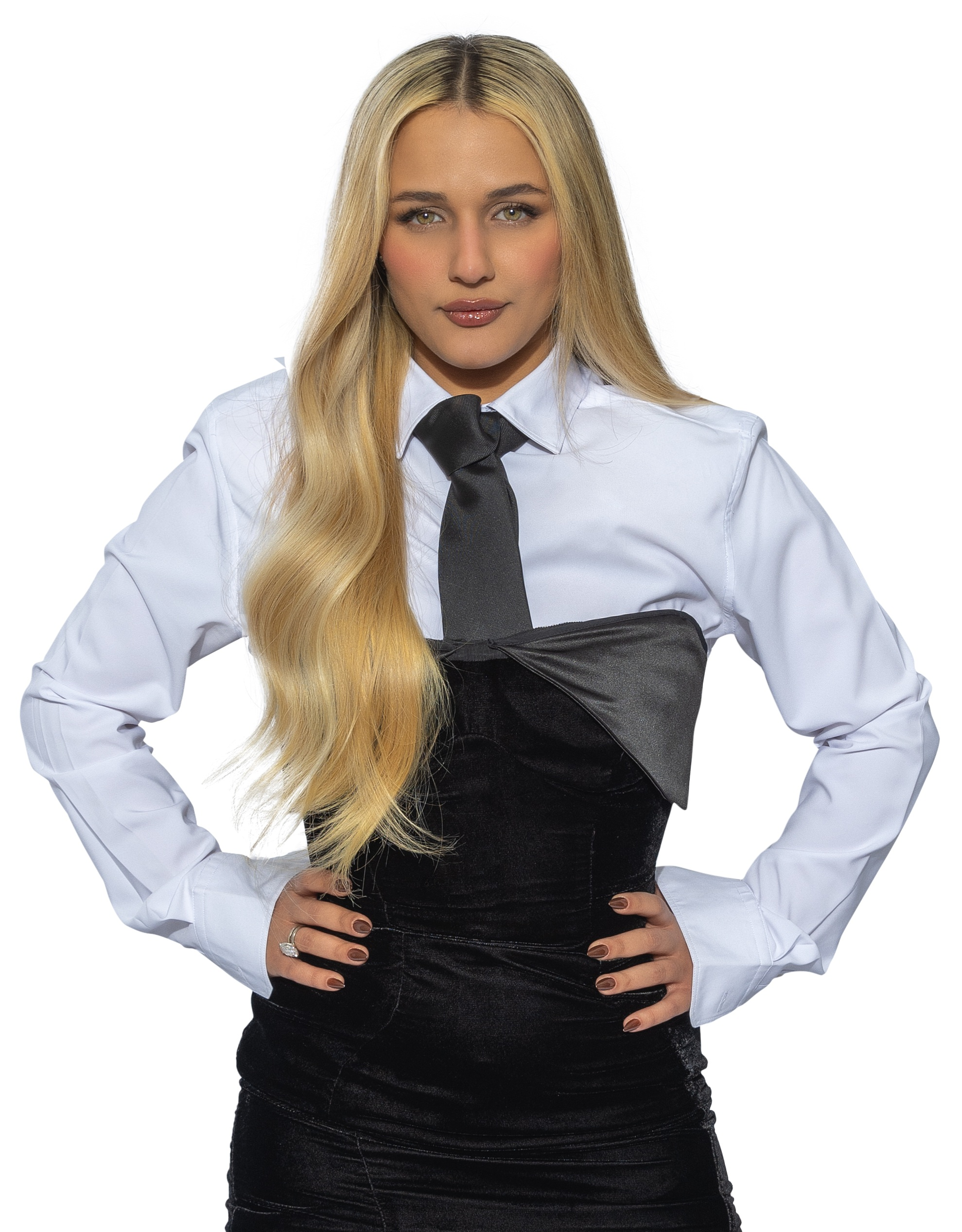
- Ben Zaken in 2024

Background information
- Born: Eden Pessia Ben Zaken; 8 June 1994 (age 32); Jerusalem, Israel
- Genres: Pop; Mizrahi; soul; R&B; folk
- Occupations: Singer
- Years active: 2013–present
- Label: Aroma
- Spouse: Shuki Biton (m. 2018)

YouTube information
- Channel: עדן בן זקן - הערוץ הרשמי
- Genre: Music
- Subscribers: 873,000
- Views: 1 billion
- Last updated: 5 August 2025

Eden Pessia Ben Zaken (Hebrew: עדן בן זקן; born 8 June 1994) is an Israeli singer-songwriter, composer and actress, who gained recognition following her participation in the first season of the reality TV show X Factor Israel, in which she placed second. She has been awarded Israel's woman of the year 3 times in a row. She has been successful since her first album, "מלכת השושנים" (Malkat Hashoshanim, meaning "Queen of the Roses"), was released. The album received a gold certification after selling more than 15,000 copies.

Ben Zaken won the title "Singer of the year" in 2015, from several Israeli radio stations, the TV channel 24 and the popular Internet site Mako. She won the title again in 2016 and 2017. In 2017, Ben Zaken won another "Singer of the year" title, from the public radio station Kan Gimel, and "Woman of the year" title, from Galgalatz, the most-popular radio station in Israel.

== Early life ==
Ben Zaken was born in Jerusalem, to Israeli-born parents of both Ashkenazi Polish-Jewish and Moroccan Jewish descent. Her parents are Maya, a teacher, and Shai a Lieutenant colonel in the Israel Defense Forces. At age one, her family moved to the Northern city of Kiryat Shmona.

As a child, Ben Zaken was often absent from school, and in 2008, at age 14, she was sent to boarding school. In eleventh grade she returned home, and began learning in a private high school. In 2013, following her participation in X Factor Israel, she moved to Ramat Gan. In July 2014, Ben Zaken was conscripted to the army for two years of service.

At the age of 17, Ben Zaken participated in the auditions for the ninth season of "Kohav Nolad," but didn't advance. She received harsh criticism, and decided not to sign up for further auditions. In 2013, when she was 18 years old, Ben Zaken was invited to the auditions for X Factor Israel. Ben Zaken was subsequently selected to advance, and her performance became popular. She was also in the girls' team of Rami Fortis, advanced to the live finals, and finished second after Rose Fostanes.

== Career ==
After X Factor, she began working on her first album. In May 2014, she collaborated with the band Ethnix in the song "מקסיקאנה" (Mexicana).

=== 2015: Malkat Hashoshanim ===
Her first single, "מנגינה" ("Mangina", meaning "Tune"), was released in January 2015, one year after the end of the first season of X Factor Israel. The single succeed and received good reviews; it reached the sixth place in the weekly chart of Media Forest, and the 13 place in the annual chart, made by channel 24 and several radio stations.

Her second single, "מלכת השושנים" (Malkat Hashoshanim, meaning "Queen of the Roses") released in May 2015, became an immediate hit. It reached the fourth place in the weekly chart of Media Forest, and the sixth place in the annual chart, made by channel 24 and several radio stations. The song had 29 million views on YouTube. In August, the third single, "שיכורים מאהבה" (Shikorim me-ahava, meaning "Drunk from love") was released and also became a hit – placing third in the weekly chart of Media Forest.

The debut album of Ben Zaken, "מלכת השושנים" (Malkat Hashoshanim, meaning "Queen of the Roses"), was released in September 2015, and received mostly good reviews, that praised her voice, and even compare her to Sarit Hadad. A few songs from the album became hits, including "פיסה מזכרוני" (Pisa mezehroni, meaning "A piece from my memory") which reached the second place in the weekly chart of Media Forest. On December 1, the album received a gold certification, after selling 15,000 copies and double-platina after reaching 50,000 digital downloads.

=== 2016: Ta'amin li ===
The first single from the album, "תאמין לי" (Ta'amin li, meaning "Believe me"), was released on 12 March. The song reached the third place in the weekly chart of Media Forest. In June 2016, Ben Zaken collaborated with Pe'er Tasi on the song "כל העיר שלנו" (Kol Ha'ir shelanu, meaning "The whole city is ours"), the second single on the album. The song received bad reviews and reached the eighth place in the weekly chart of Media Forest, but succeeded online and reached 15 million views on YouTube. The third single "תזיזו" (Tazizu, meaning "Move (something)"), released in August 2016. The song was a big success – it reached the third place in the weekly chart of Media Forest, became the new theme song of cable channel Arutz HaYeladim and reached the 33rd place in the yearly chart of Galgalatz.

Her second album. "תאמין לי" (Taamin li, meaning "Believe me"), was released in September 2016. The album received mixed reviews, some of them praised Ben Zakan for the mature words and the unique music style she has developed (a combination of oriental music and soul music) in the album. The songs "כשאתפרק" (Kshe'etparek, meaning "When I fall apart") and "אין לי אותך" (Ein li otcha, meaning "I don't have you") from the album became popular, and the songs "ג'נטלמן" (Gentlemen) and "בחור מזהב" (Bahur mizahav, meaning "A guy from gold") became hits among oriental music lovers.

Another successful song from the album is "אף אחד" (Af echad, meaning "Nobody"), which reached the second place in the weekly chart of Media Forest, the first place in the Galgalatz's weekly playlist, the eighth place in the yearly chart of Galgalatz and the sixth place in the yearly chart of "Reshet Gimel". The fifth song from the album, "הייתי חוזרת" (Haiti hozeret, meaning "I would come back"), released in November 2016 and received good reviews on originality and for that it's her first pure soul song (not mixed with other styles of music). The album received a platinum certification in its premiere night, after selling 40,000 copies in less than two months.

=== 2017–present: Lezot Shenitzha ===
The first single from the album, "לזאת שניצחה" (Lezot Shenitzha, meaning "To the one who won"), released on 12 February and reached the fifth place in the weekly chart of Media Forest. Ben Zaken performed in Caesarea theater in front of 3,500 people three times—on 16 May, 1 July, and 2 September. She was criticized on her lack of ability to "hold" a full show as the main singer. She also performed in the sultan's pool, another reputed performance site in Israel.

The second single from the album, "רציתי" (Ratziti, meaning "I wanted"), was released on 13 June. It was more successful then the first single, and became one of the 'songs of the year' – It reached the first place in the Galgalatz weekly chart, the second place in Media Forest weekly chart, the second place in the yearly chart of 'Kan Gimel' and the ninth place in the yearly chart of Galgalatz. The third single, "כולם באילת" (Kulam Be'eilat, meaning "Everyone is in Eilat") was released on 2 August.

Ben Zaken was chosen to be a judge in the third season of X Factor Israel as a replacement for Shiri Maimon, who went on maternity leave. Her third album, "לזאת שניצחה" (Lezot shenitzcha, meaning "To the one who won"), was released on 6 September. In 2017, Ben Zaken received the title "singer of the year" from 'Kan Gimel and the title "woman of the year" from Galgalatz. Five of Ben Zaken's songs entered the yearly chart of Galgalatz, two of them in the top ten – an all-time record for a female singer. In 2024, she featured on a new single "Godmother", a track with Noga Erez on her album, The Vandalist.

== Personal life ==
Ben Zaken got engaged in February 2017 to Shuki Biton, which inspired her song "Meoreset" ("Engaged"). The two married in May 2018. She gave birth to their son Mishel Micha Biton in May 2020. Her unique music style combines Mizrahi music, soul, pop, and R&B. Her influences include Eyal Golan, Sarit Hadad, Christina Aguilera, and Beyonce.

== Discography ==
=== Studio albums ===
- 2015: מלכת השושנים (Queen of the Roses)
- 2016: תאמין לי (Believe Me)
- 2017: לזאת שניצחה (To the One Who Won)
- 2019: חיים שלי (My Life)
- 2021: מועבט (Moabet)
- 2022: עם או בלי לאהוב (With or Without Loving)
- 2023: 7
- 2024: דם שלי (My Blood)

== Awards and nominations ==
- In 'The Israeli yearly chart' (year 5775 in the Hebrew calendar - 2014\2015) of Channel 24 and Haifa radio, Tel Aviv radio, South radio and 99.5 Hot as fire radio In that chart, her song "מנגינה" reached the 13 place and the song "מלכת השושנים" reached the sixth place. In the year after, she won again the "singer of the year" title, and the song "תאמין לי" reached the fourth place in the chart.
- The first Israeli music clip that reached 20 million views on YouTube.
- Nomination for the 'European artist of the year' title of MTV.
- Her first album, "מלכת השושנים", received a gold certification after selling 15,000 copies and double platinum for 50,000 digital downloads,
- '"The most influential Israeli at age 22", in 2016.
- "Singer of the year" in 2017, in the 'Ceremony for children's choices'
- "Woman of the year" In the yearly chart of Galgalatz. In that chart she had 5 songs – the highest number of songs of one artist in the chart.
- "Singer of the year" title, from the public radio station 'Kan Gimel'.
