= Miri Mesika =

Israeli singer and actress

Miri Mesika מירי מסיקה
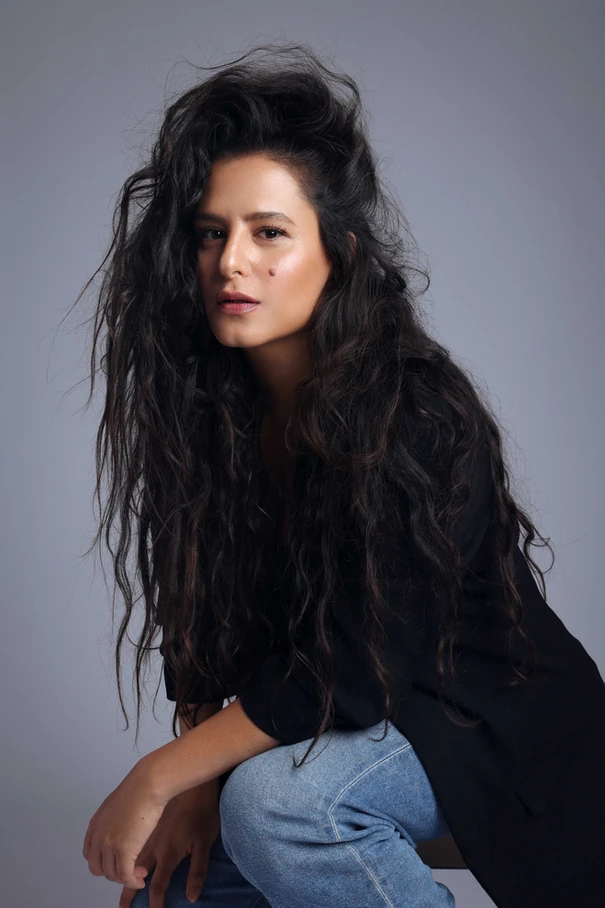
- Mesika in 2023

Background information
- Born: Herzliya
- Origin: Herzliya, Israel
- Genres: Pop; folk; rock
- Occupations: Singer; actress
- Years active: 1998–present
- Label: Anana label of Hed Arzi

Miri Mesika (Hebrew: מירי מסיקה) is an Israeli singer and actress. She won several "Female Singer of the Year" awards and sold more than 200,000 copies of her albums in Israel. She is also known for her portrayal of the title role of Dina in the West End production of The Band's Visit, for which she was nominated for the 2023 Laurence Olivier Award for Best Actress in a Musical.

== Biography ==
Miri Mesika was born and grew up in Herzliya, Israel. Her father is of Tunisian-Jewish descent and her mother is of Iraqi-Jewish descent. As a child she studied music, and played the guitar and the recorder at the city music school. In 1994, she was accepted to HaYovel High School, where she studied theatre and music. She by way of Israeli mandatory conscription, served as an operations NCO in the IDF's Infantry Corps.

== Music career ==
In 1999, Mesika started her studies at the Rimon School of Jazz and Contemporary Music in Ramat HaSharon, a leading music school whose graduates included Noa and Aviv Geffen. She was a classmate of Keren Peles and Aya Korem, who also became well-known singers.

During her studies at Rimon, she participated in several ensembles. In one of them she met the musician Ori Zakh, who went on to become her husband and record producer. Miri and Ori married on June 2, 2005.

At Rimon School Mesika met the songwriter Keren Peles, with whom she started working on songs for Mesika's debut album. After graduating, Mesika created a live show based on songs by Keren Peles. The show, produced and engineered by Ori Zakh, included the songs November and LeSham. The show was warmly received by the audience, and immediately afterwards Mesika was offered a recording contract with Hed Arzi Music under the Anana label.

After finishing music studies in Rimon, Mesika began studying Acting at the Sofi Moskovich School of Performing Arts. During her studies she acted and sang in various plays, including the main character in The Night of the Iguana and Blood Wedding.

Meanwhile, she participated as the soloist in tribute evenings to different poets, such as Hayyim Nahman Bialik, Natan Yonatan, Nurit Zarchi and Itzik Manger. Mesika and Zakh also created a show composed of songs by the songwriter Tzruya (Suki) Lahav as part of the Piano Festival in Tel Aviv.

Mesika became known in public in 2004 with her first album, Miri Mesika, produced and mixed by Ori Zakh and Shmulik Neufeld. Miri Mesika's first single, Tipa Tipa (טיפה טיפה, "Little by Little"), dealing with the recovery from a lost love, was released in November 2004 and achieved moderate success. However, the next two singles written by Keren Peles, November (נובמבר, January 2005) and LeSham (לשם, "To There", March 2005) were huge radio hits. LeSham won the Galgalatz award as Song of the Year.

The album saw light of day in March 2005 under the Anana label. More singles from the album were released afterwards. The song Ba'a Eleikhem (באה אליכם, "Coming to You") was released in July, and also gained much popularity. The lyrics describe a trusting relationship between a daughter and her parents, and the song has an up-tempo ethnic rhythm. Another single released in July 2005 is Af Akhat (אף אחת, "No one"), a song of a lover who would not give up her loved one, written by Tzruya (Suki) Lahav. The next single (November 23, 2005) was Shir LeShira (שיר לשירה, "A Song to Shira"), a cover version of Corinne Allal's song. It is an emotional song of a mother promising to give a "new and good world" to her baby daughter, with lyrics written by Yehonatan Geffen. The last single from the album was the romantic song Ten Li Siman (תן לי סימן, "Give Me a Sign"), released in February 2006.

In 2006 Miri Mesika recorded the song Kluv shel Zahav (כלוב של זהב, "A Golden Cage") with Teapacks, which appeared on their album Radio/Musika/Ivrit.

Miri Mesika's second album, Shalom LaEmunot (Good-bye Beliefs), appeared in February 2007. The release included a limited edition bonus CD of the songs from the movie Shalosh Imahot. Mesika went on a performance tour following the release of the album, and in May 2008 the album went platinum. This album, as the first one, was produced and mixed by Mesika's husband, Ori Zakh.

Mesika and Berman released the song "Erev Hag" ("Holiday Eve"), written by Berman and dedicated to Gilad Shalit, an Israeli soldier was held hostage by the Hamas for over two years. In the same month Mesika's duet with Ofer Bashan, "HaOr Yizrah Gam Benifrad" ("The Light Will Keep Shining Separated"), appeared on Bashan's second album. In 2008, Mesika played the narrator in Joseph and the Amazing Technicolor Dreamcoat staged by Habima Theatre. In November 2008 she went on a tour of unplugged performances around Israel.

== Acting career ==
In 2005 Miri Mesika took part in the Habima Theatre production of the musical King Solomon and Shalmai the Shoemaker. The musical was widely praised and won the Musical of the Year award at the 2005 Israeli Theatre Awards.

In November 2006 she played in the drama film Shalosh Imahot ("Three Mothers"). In the film she performed two new songs—Eikh Hayinu (איך היינו) and Birkat HaMelekh (ברכת המלך)—and cover versions of Ilana Rovina's Bikashti Esh (ביקשתי אש) and Geula Gil's Daber Elay BiFrahim (דבר אליי בפרחים). In the same year she recorded the song HaAviv Sheli Yagi'a (האביב שלי יגיע, "My Spring Will Come") for the drama film Aviva Ahuvati ("Aviva My Love").

In 2007, Mesika took part in Amos Gitai's film, The Dybbuk in Haifa, and in the Festigal festival of children's songs. In March 2008 she released a cover for Berry Sakharof's song, "Kakha ze" ("This Is How It Is") for the second edition of the project Hebrew Labor, dedicated to Israel's 60-year anniversary.

In 2016, Mesika played the role of Fantine in the Habima production of Les Miserables, directed by Moshe Kepten.

In 2022, Mesika was cast in the leading role of Dina for the European premiere of The Band's Visit in London's West End. The production earned mainly positive reviews, with The Guardian praising Mesika for her "stunning performance." The production earned six 2023 Laurence Olivier Award nominations, including a nomination for Mesika in Best Actress in a Musical. During the televised awards ceremony, Mesika performed the show's title song "Omar Sharif" to great praise.

== Television career ==
In 2012, Mesika was a judge on Kokhav Nolad, the Israeli version of American Idol, and in 2016, she is a coach on the fourth season of "The Voice Israel". In 2019 she starred in the lead role in Israel's channel 12 TV network's "it's got nothing to do with age".

== Awards and recognition ==
She took part in the Shirimon song contest, a song contest of the Rimon School, and won the first place with David De'or's song Mishehu Kayam produced by Zakh. Shalom LaEmunot gave Mesika another win as Female Singer of the Year, this time both on Galgalatz and on Reshet Gimel. The song "Akhshav Ata Hozer BeHazara" ("Now you're coming back"), written by Eric Berman, won the Reshet Gimel Song of the Year award. Miri Mesika won the Female Singer of the Year award on Galgalatz, and the Discovery of the Year award both on Galgalatz and on Reshet Gimel. The album went double platinum with over 80,000 copies. In 2006, Mesika won another Female Singer of the Year award, this time at the Ami Awards of Music Channel 24.

At the 2008 Ami Awards of Music Channel 24, she received another Female Singer of the Year award.

== Discography ==
=== Albums ===
Year	Album	Israel Certificate	Sales
2005	Miri Mesika	Double platinum	+80,000
2007	Shalom LaEmunot	Platinum	+40,000
2010	Hadashot Tovot	Gold	+15,000
2012	Melekh	Gold	+15,000
2014	Simanim al hachol		
2017	The God of Small Things		

=== Other charted songs ===
List of charted songs, with selected chart positions
Title	Year	Peak chart positions	Album
Title	Year	US Christ	Album
"Wy God - My God" (with Phil Wickham)	2026	43	DAVID (Soundtrack from the Angel Original Film)
"Tapestry" (with Brandon Engman)	2026	44	DAVID (Soundtrack from the Angel Original Film)

== See also ==
- Music of Israel
