= Margalit Tzan'ani =

Israeli singer and television personality (born 1948)

Margalit Tzan'ani מרגלית צנעני
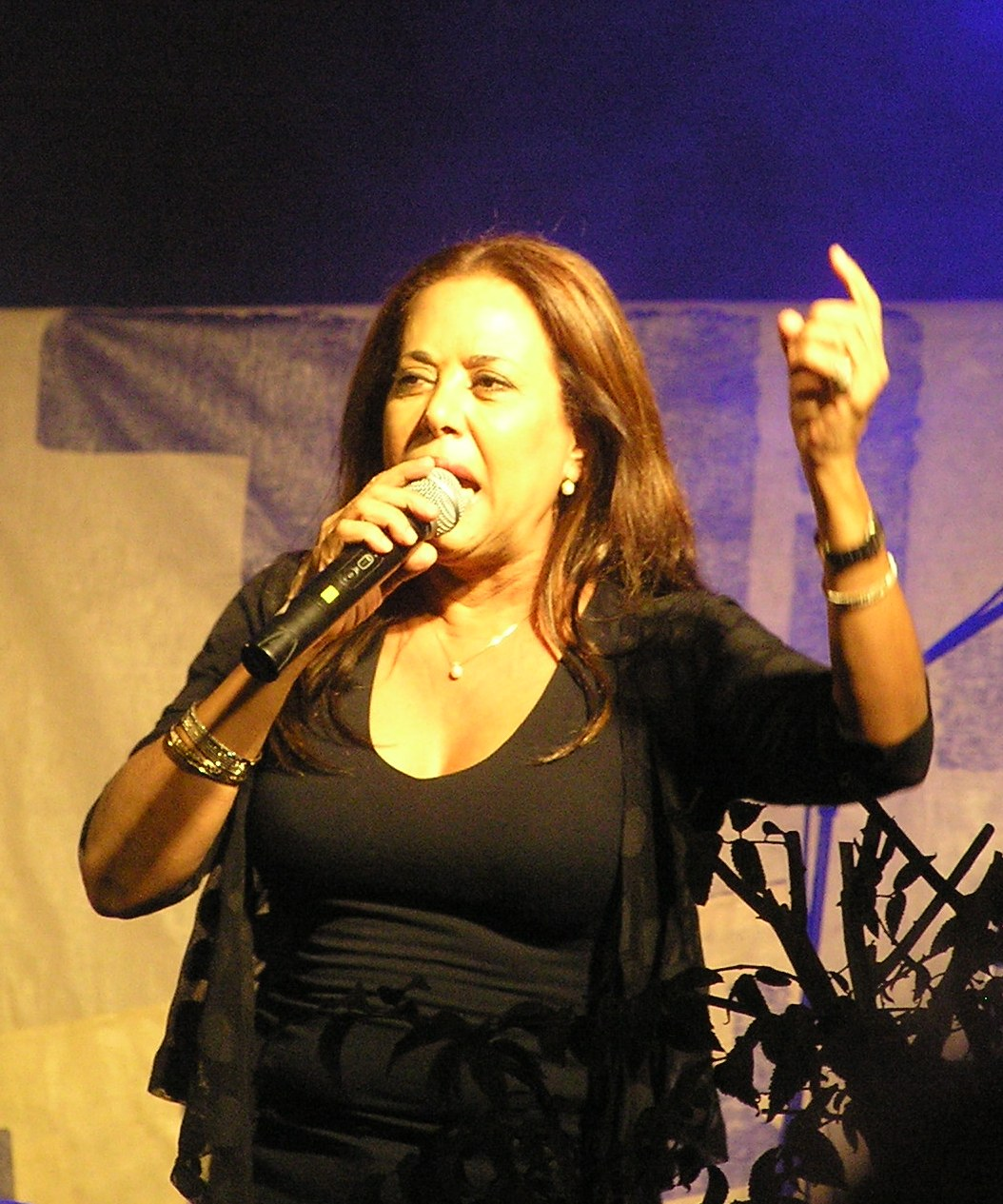

Background information
- Born: December 19, 1948 (age 77); Aden, Aden Colony, British Empire
- Origin: Israel
- Genres: Mizrahi, soul
- Occupations: Singer, TV host
- Years active: 1971–present

Margalit "Margol" Tzan'ani (Hebrew: מרגלית "מרגול" צנעני; born December 19, 1948) is an Israeli singer and television personality. Tzan'ani is famous for her repertoire of Israeli oriental music style with soul influences, as well as jazz, blues, rock, and pop.

== Biography ==
Tzan'ani was born in Aden, Yemen, to a religious Jewish family originally from Sana'a, Yemen. When she was one year old, the family immigrated to Israel with her and resided in Netanya. She was the eldest of seven children. Her father, Shalom, was a diamond industry worker, and her mother, Lola, was a housewife. She married Mordi Lavi in 1977 and has one son, Asaf. She divorced in 1985. For many years she performed at weddings and private events. She also worked at a stall in the Jaffa flea market and as a salesgirl at Hamashbir Latzarchan department store. Today she lives in Azor, a village on the outskirts of Tel Aviv.

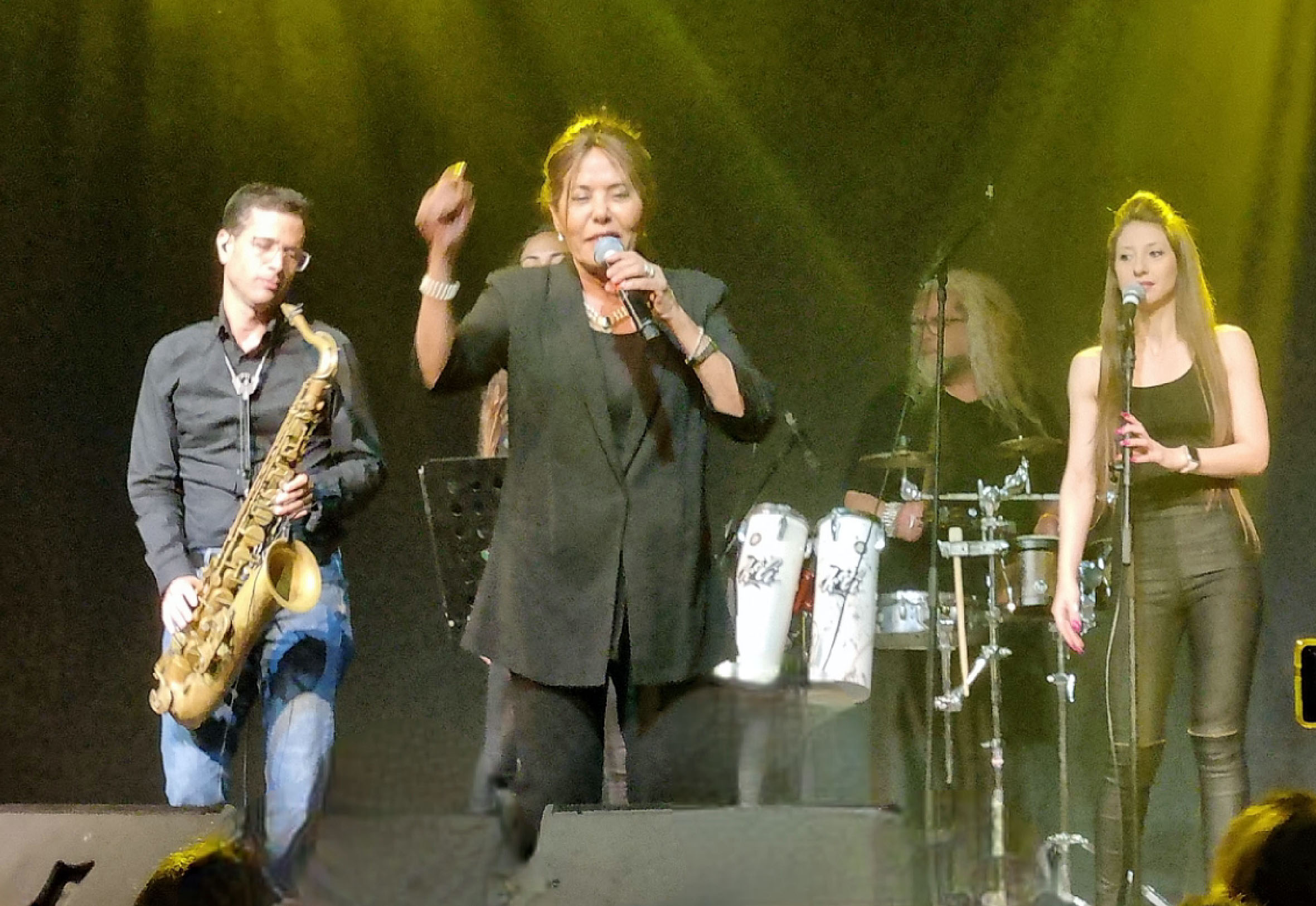
Tazam'ani performing in May 2022

== Musical career ==
Tzan'ani started her career at the age of 19 in the Israeli production of Hair, where she performed alongside Svika Pick and Tzedi Tzarfati. For the audition, she sang "Rak al atzmi lesaper yadati", based on a poem by the poet Rachel.In an interview with Haaretz newspaper, Tzan'ani cited Ella Fitzgerald, Tina Turner, and Aretha Franklin as major influences.

== Television career ==
In 2006, she was chosen to be a judge in Kokhav Nolad, the Israeli version of American Idol. She continued in this capacity for four seasons.

== Controversy ==
On August 16, 2011 Israeli Police arrested Tzan'ani and her son, Asaf Tzan'ani, during a raid on their homes. She was charged with extortion and blackmail against her manager, Assaf Atedgi. The charges against her son, Asaf, were dropped. Tzan'ani denied the charges against her. The case was covered widely by the Israeli media and at the same time, the media was criticized for portraying successful Mizrahi recording artists as engaged in illegal activities. Tzan'ani was tried, found guilty and sentenced to 6 months in prison, which she served performing community service. She later continued her music career.

== Discography ==
- 1986 – Na'Ari Shuva Elay
- 1987 – Shmor Oti
- 1988 – Ahava Avuda
- 1989 – Menta
- 1990 – Homot Hemar
- 1991 – Pgisha
- 1992 – Greatest Hits 1
- 1993 – Margol
- 1995 – Erez Esh Eretz Yam
- 1997 – Hofshi
- 2003 – LeOlam
- 2005 – Gale Li
- 2006 – Gold
- 2009 – Davka Hayom
