= Honigman =

Honigman (or Honigmann) is a German and Jewish surname derived from the German words "Honig" (honey) and "Mann" (man). It may refer to:

== Companies ==
- Honigman LLP, a law firm headquartered in Detroit, Michigan
- Honigman (clothing company), an Israeli fashion company

== People ==
- Jason L. Honigman (1904–1990), U.S. lawyer, co-founder of Honigman LLP
- Steven S. Honigman (1948–2022), U.S. lawyer
- Sylvie Honigman (born 1965), academic and author

== See also ==
- Honigmann (disambiguation)
