= Honigmann =

Honigmann (or Honigman) is a German and Jewish surname derived from the German words "Honig" (honey) and "Mann" (man). Notable people with the surname include:

Honigmann:

- Barbara Honigmann (born 1949), German author and artist
- E. A. J. Honigmann (1927–2011), German-born U.K. Shakespeare scholar and Fellow of the British Academy
- Friedrich Honigmann (1841–1913), German coal entrepreneur
- Heddy Honigmann (1951–2022), Peruvian-Dutch film director

Honigman:

- Jason L. Honigman (1904–1990), U.S. lawyer
- Steven S. Honigman (1948–2022), U.S. lawyer
- Sylvie Honigman (born 1965), academic and author

== See also ==
- Honigman (clothing company), Israeli fashion company
- Honigman LLP, a business law firm based in Michigan
- Honigman (disambiguation)
