= Tom Nicon =

French model (1988–2010)

- Born: 22 March 1988; Toulouse, France
- Died: 18 June 2010 (aged 22); Milan, Italy
- Occupation: Fashion model
- Modeling information
- Height: 1.88 m (6 ft 2 in)

Tom Nicon (22 March 1988 – 18 June 2010) was a French male model who modeled for a number of clients including Louis Vuitton, GQ and Vogue. He took part in shows for numerous high fashion brands and was most famous for being the "face" for top UK fashion house Burberry.

== Career ==
Nicon was born in Toulouse, France. He was best known for his role as the face for Burberry. Considered one of Europe's most promising models at the time, he walked for numerous high-name brands such as Yves Saint-Laurent, Jean-Paul Gaultier, Hugo Boss, Versace, Dolce and Gabbana, and Kenzo.

== Death ==
Nicon's body was found in the courtyard of a building in central Milan on 18 June 2010 after falling four floors from a window of an apartment he was residing in and just hours before a scheduled show he was to appear in at Milan Fashion Week event. He had attended a Versace fitting on the same morning. Police concluded he died by suicide. No suicide note was found.

Milan Police's theory was that Nicon was depressed after recently breaking up with his Italian girlfriend, while Italian fashion tycoon Giorgio Armani was quoted as saying "This world is too closely linked to youth and makes it seem like life ends at 22, ... We need to make the young understand life is beautiful from 23 onwards as well". Another industry insider was quoted as saying "The men realise it is not a long-term career – unlike the women, who know that if they can make a name they can stay in the business longer, move on to do other things and turn themselves into a brand.".

His death was referred to as a case in a "series of tragedies" ongoing in the fashion industry at the time, such as the suicides of designer Alexander McQueen, models Daul Kim, Ambrose Olsen, Hayley Marie Kohle, Lina Marulanda, Ruslana Korshunova and the suicide attempt of model Noemie Lenoir.
