= Fox (clothing) =

Israeli fashion store chain

Fuchs-Wiesel Ltd. פוקס-ויזל בע"מ
- Four different logos of the company for its different brands (left to right): FOX (for women), FOX MEN; FOX KIDS, FOX BABY
- Type: Public (TASE: FOX)
- Industry: Fashion
- Founded: 1942; 84 years ago in the British Mandate of Palestine
- Founder: Har'el Vizel
- Headquarters: Tel Aviv District, Israel
- Number of locations: 600+ (2025)
- Area served: Israel; Russia; Singapore; China; India; Bulgaria; Croatia; Romania; Thailand; Panama; Canada; Cyprus
- Key people: Avraham Fox (Chairman, CO-CEO); Harel Wizel (CO-CEO, Director)
- Products: Clothing, fashion accessories
- Number of employees: 6,800
- Website: www.fox.co.il (in Hebrew)

Fuchs-Wiesel Inc. (Hebrew: פוקס-ויזל בע"מ), known by its brand name Fox (Hebrew: פוקס), is an Israeli clothing retail company. It is traded in the Tel Aviv Stock Exchange.

== History ==
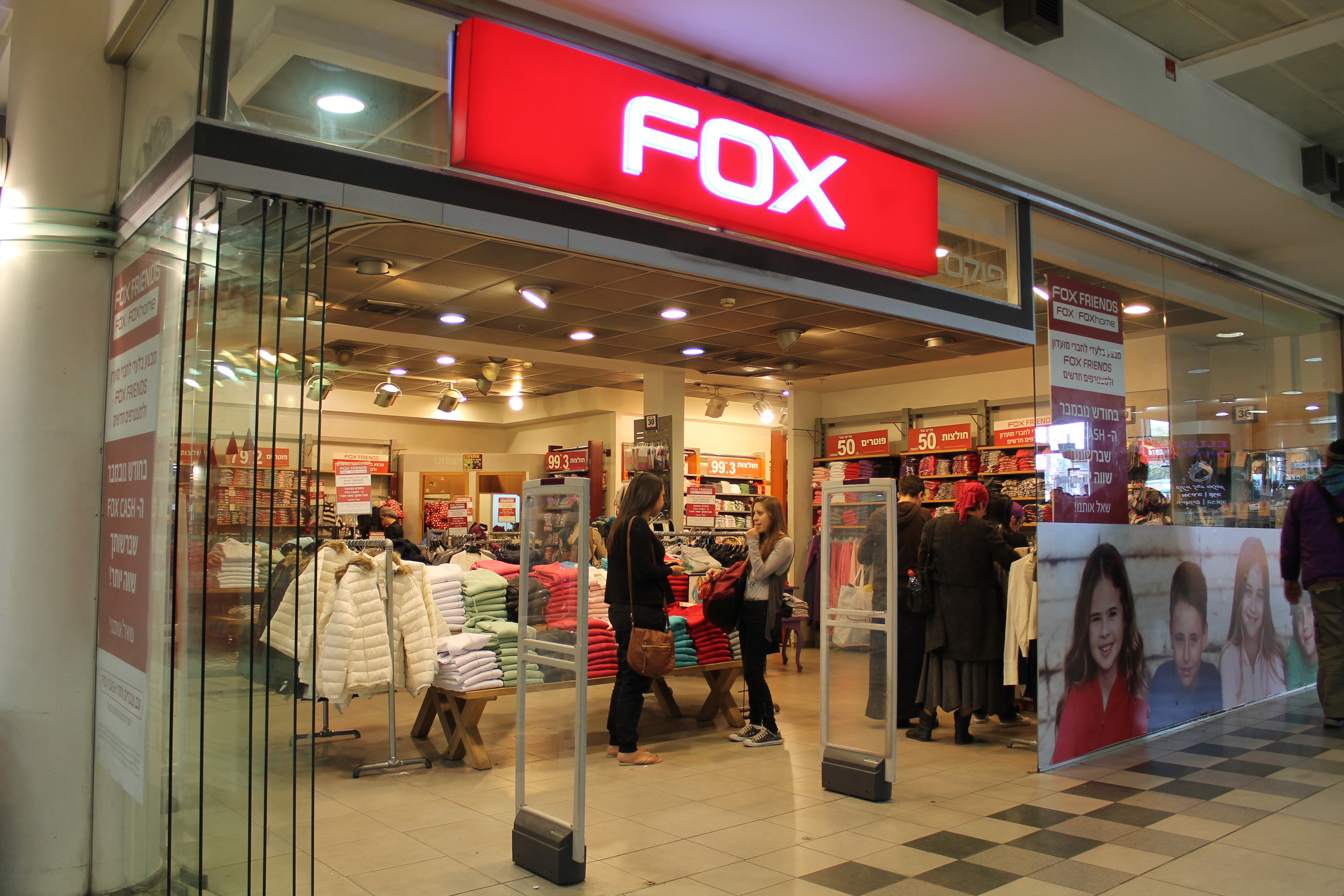
A Fox store

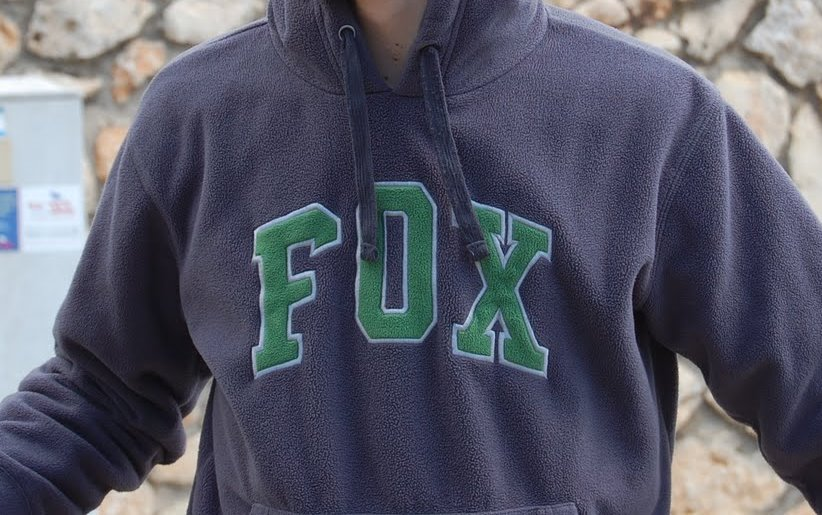
Fox Hoodie

Fox was founded in 1942 in The British Mandate of Palestine (now Israel) as Trico Fox Ltd. (Hebrew: טריקו פוקס בע"מ). After having its IPO on TASE in 2002, the company became Fox-Wizel Ltd. Today, Fox is an international chain with stores in ten countries: Israel, Russia, Singapore, China, Bulgaria, Croatia, Romania, Thailand, Panama and the Philippines. In Fall 2008, Fox stores opened in Canada. There is also one store in Munich, Germany.

Fox also has a joint partnership (50%) in Laline Candles & Soaps Ltd. The company is headquartered in Ben Gurion International Airport, near Tel Aviv.

In 2008, Fox encountered criticism and faced a potential consumer boycott in Israel when they signed Israeli supermodel Bar Refaeli, who avoided Israel's mandatory military service via a nuptial exemption for a marriage lasting a short period of time, on a $300,000 campaign deal. Fox responded by having Refaeli plan to act as an IDF "Enlistment Officer" and visit injured soldiers.

== Spokesmodels ==
- Yael Bar Zohar
- Esti Ginzburg
- Michael Lewis
- Agam Rodberg
- Bar Refaeli
- Eithan Urbach
- Tomer Kapon
- Shlomit Malka
- Yehuda Levi

== See also ==
- Israeli fashion
- Castro
- Hamashbir Lazarchan
- Honigman
- TNT
