= Noémie Lenoir =

French model and actress

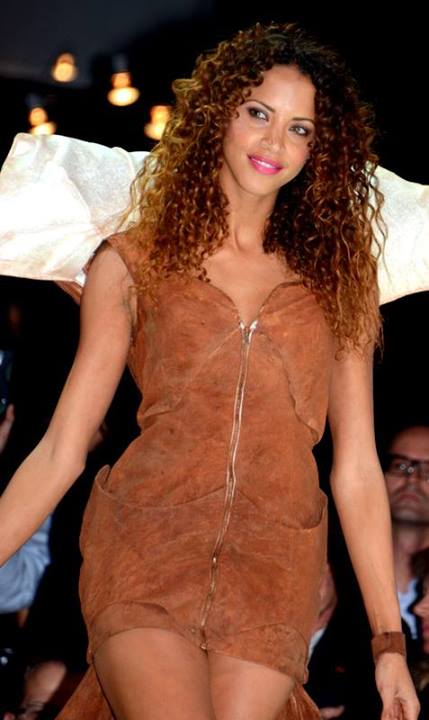
- Lenoir at Paris Chocolate Show in 2013
- Born: 19 September 1979 (age 47); Les Ulis, France
- Children: 2
- Modelling information
- Height: 1.77 m (5 ft 10 in)
- Hair colour: Black
- Eye colour: Green
- Agency: Ford Models (New York); Next Model Management (Paris); Models 1 (London); Elite Model Management (Barcelona); Model Management (Hamburg)

Noémie Lenoir (born 19 September 1979) is a French model and actress. She is known for her work with Gucci, L'Oréal, Next, Gap, Tommy Hilfiger, Victoria's Secret, Balmain Paris Hair Couture and Marks and Spencer.

== Early life ==
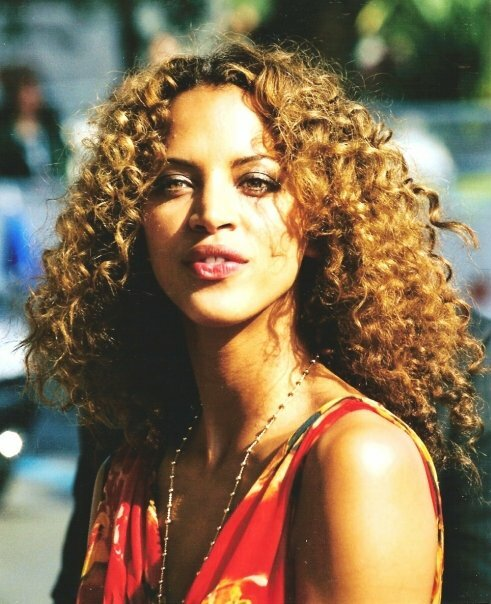
Noémie Lenoir at the 2005 Cannes Film Festival

Lenoir was born in Les Ulis, Essonne, France. Her mother is a cleaning lady and comes from the French island of Réunion. Her father is a Frenchman from mainland France and an electrician. When she was 17, Lenoir was spotted by the Ford modelling agency and began modelling in New York.

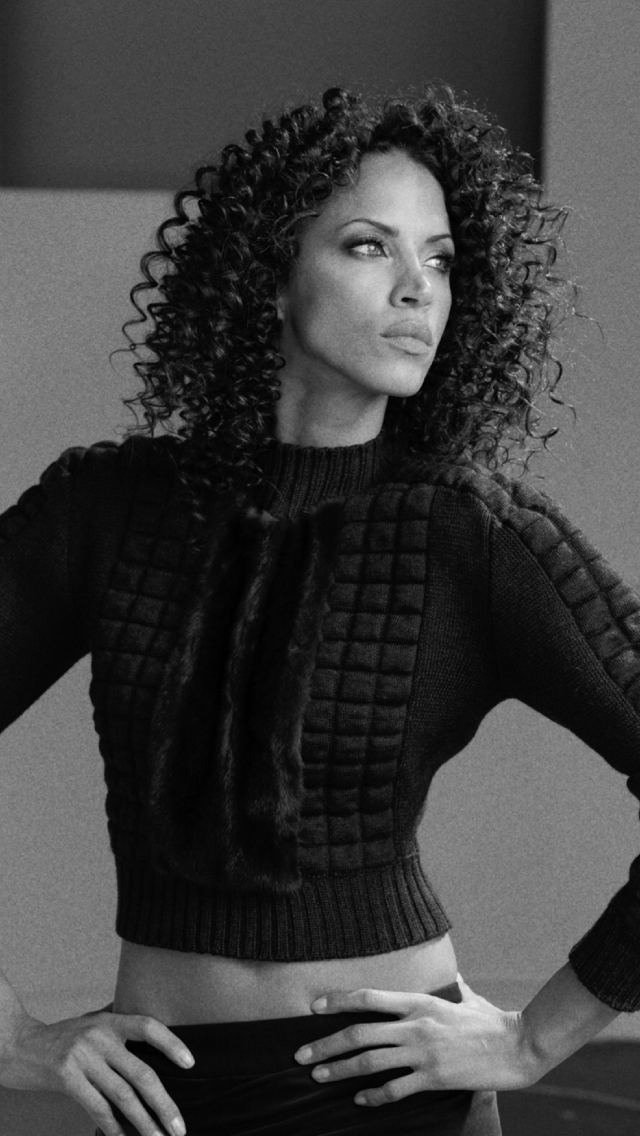
Noémie Lenoir in 2015

== Career ==
Growing up in a banlieue district near Paris, which she describes as a "ghetto", Lenoir was first spotted at the age of 17 in 1997 when she was approached by a Ford booker in a post office. She signed with L'Oréal in 1997, and has since appeared in their advertisements alongside Laetitia Casta and long-term model and actress Andie MacDowell. She has also worked for Victoria's Secret, Gap, Next, and many others.

Lenoir was the face of UK high-street retailer Marks & Spencer, for four years until Christmas 2009 and was seen in various British TV adverts, magazines and billboards alongside fellow models Erin O'Connor, Twiggy and Laura Bailey. Lenoir returned to Marks & Spencer advertising in 2012 where she is seen "enjoying a selection of quintessentially British pastimes".

In 2007, Lenoir featured in the hit film Rush Hour 3 alongside actors Jackie Chan and Chris Tucker. In 2009, Lenoir featured in the music video for Usher's single "Hey Daddy (Daddy's Home)".

She is represented by Models 1.

== Personal life ==
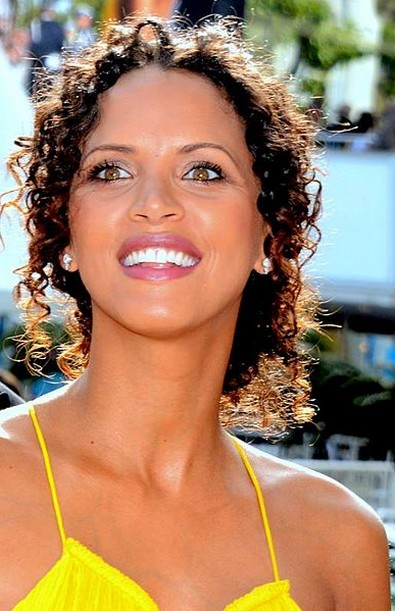
Noémie Lenoir at the 2015 Cannes Film Festival

After a relationship with rapper Stomy Bugsy, she lived with international football player Claude Makélélé. They have a son. The couple split in early 2009. Lenoir gave birth to a daughter in August 2015.

=== Suicide attempt ===
On 9 May 2010, Lenoir was found unconscious, after a suspected suicide attempt in a park near her Paris home, by a man walking his dog. She was taken to hospital where large quantities of drugs and alcohol were found in her system. She spoke about the suicide attempt in a February 2011 interview with Britain's Guardian Weekend magazine, admitting she had done "something really, really stupid". Some have referred to the incident as a case in a "series of suicidal tragedies" ongoing in the fashion industry at the time, along with the suicides of Ambrose Olsen, Daul Kim, Tom Nicon, Hayley Kohle, and Ruslana Korshunova.

== Television ==
- Britain's Next Top Model, Cycle 6 – (1 episode, 19 July 2010)
- Danse avec les stars - contestant (2013)

She hosted a show on Trace TV for two years. She appears in all three Marks and Spencer Christmas TV adverts for 2009, broadcast in both Ireland and the United Kingdom.

== Filmography ==
Year	Title	Role	Director	Notes
2002	Asterix & Obelix: Mission Cleopatra	Guimieukis	Alain Chabat	
2003	Gomez & Tavarès	Gina	Gilles Paquet-Brenner	
2004	After the Sunset	Mooré's girl	Brett Ratner	
2004	Jeff et Léo, flics et jumeaux	Anna	Étienne Dhaene	TV series (1 episode)
2006	The Valet	Karine	Francis Veber	
2007	Rush Hour 3	Geneviève	Brett Ratner	
2007	Gomez vs. Tavarès	Gina	Gilles Paquet-Brenner & Cyril Sebas	
2014	Scènes de ménages	Isabelle	Francis Duquet	TV series (1 episode)
2015	The Transporter Refueled	Maissa	Camille Delamarre	
2018	Alad'2	The stewardess	Lionel Steketee	
2020	Qu'est-ce qu'on va faire de toi, Maman ?		Anne Roumanoff	Filming
2020	Capitaine Marleau		Josée Dayan	TV series (1 Episode)
