= Michael Lewis (model) =

Israeli actor and fashion model (born 1987)

- מייקל לואיס
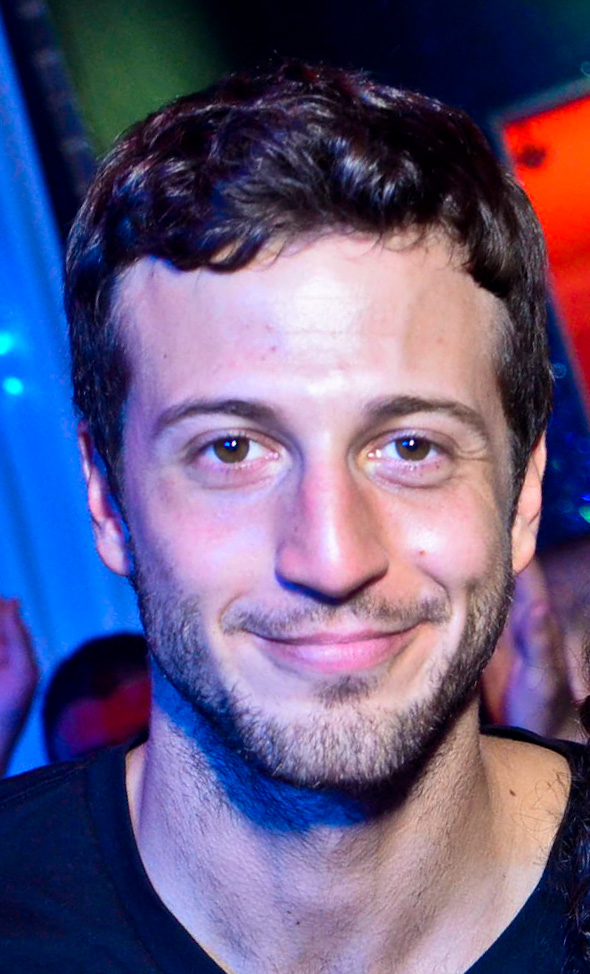
- Lewis in 2011
- Born: Michael Mario Lewis; 21 December 1987 (age 37); Tel Aviv, Israel
- Modeling information
- Height: 6 ft 2 in (188 cm)
- Hair color: Brown
- Eye color: Hazel

Michael Mario Lewis (Hebrew: מייקל לואיס; born 21 December 1987) is an Israeli actor and fashion model. From 2007 to 2008, Lewis modeled for the Israeli clothing company Fox, with Esti Ginzburg. He appeared in fashion shows for Castro, and has been on the cover of several Israeli magazines.

== Early life ==
Lewis was born and raised in Tel Aviv, Israel, to an Argentine mother and Dutch father.

He studied at Ahad HaAm High School in Petah Tikva. Lewis played basketball in the "Ahad Ha'am" high school team, as part of the Premier League for high schools. In the 2006-2007 season, he joined Maccabi Petah Tikva's senior team, when the team played in the national league. In the 2008-2009 season, Lewis played in the AL Or Yehuda team from the second league.

He suffers from Wolff–Parkinson–White syndrome and was exempted from conscription in the Israel Defense Forces. He volunteered to serve, but his request was denied.

== Career ==
In 2005, Lewis began working as an underwear model, appearing at a fashion show for the "El Niño" company held at a gay club. He also wrote a weekly column and blog for Walla! portal, which he wrote until February 2007, and for a few months after, also through a blog. He also appeared in fashion shows for the Israeli fashion company Castro.

At the beginning of November 2006, he replaced Yehuda Levi as the main male fashion model for Fox, starting with the summer 2007 campaign. He appeared with Esti Ginzburg for the summer fashion catalog.

In addition, he has appeared on the covers of several youth and entertainment newspapers. He also appeared in the January 2008 issue of the French gay magazine Têtu.

In early 2010, he and professional dancer Anna Arronov were winners of the fifth season of Rokdim Im Kokhavim, the Israeli version of Dancing with the Stars.

In 2011, Lewis was chosen by E!: Entertainment Television as one of “The 25 Sexiest Men in the World”, next to George Clooney and Brad Pitt.

In 2012, he participated in the sixth season of the Israeli version of the reality show Survivor The VIP season; he was medically evacuated on Day 2 of 40, becoming the first person to leave the show. He took part in the third season of Italian Peking Express in 2014, along with rally pilot Luca Betti, ending their journey in the fourth episode.

In 2021, he participated in the eleventh season of the Israeli version of the reality show Survivor. He was voted out on Day 21, becoming the eighth person to be sent to Cabin Guard, where he would have a chance to return to the game. He lost his first duel the same day and thus became the sixth person permanently eliminated from the game.

In July 2021, Lewis opened an OnlyFans account.

== Personal life ==
Lewis speaks three languages (Hebrew, English and Italian). He started acting and modeling when he was 15 years old.
