= Kohle =

Kohle is a surname. Notable people with the surname include:

- Hayley Marie Kohle (1982–2008), Canadian fashion model
- Horst Kohle (born 1935), German football player
- Stefanie Köhle (born 1986), Austrian alpine skier

== See also ==
- Kohl (surname)
- Kohler
- Kole (name)
