= Hamashbir Lazarchan =

Israeli department store chain

- Company type: Public
- Traded as: TASE: MSBZ
- Industry: Department store
- Founded: Israel (1947)
- Headquarters: Netanya, Israel
- Area served: Israel
- Key people: Rami Shavit (CEO); Hadar Olsker (CFO); Nissim Hassan (COO)
- Revenue: NIS 907 million (2006)
- Number of employees: 3651
- Website: Mashbir.co.il

Hamashbir Lazarchan (Hebrew: המשביר לצרכן) is an Israeli chain of department stores. Hamashbir consists of 33 branches across the country.

It is distinct from its predecessors, the consumer cooperative Hamashbir (1916–1930), reorganised as the wholesale supplier Hamashbir Hamerkazi in 1930. The original Hamashbir was set up with the goal of supplying the Jewish communities of Palestine with food at affordable prices during the shortage years of the First World War.

== History ==
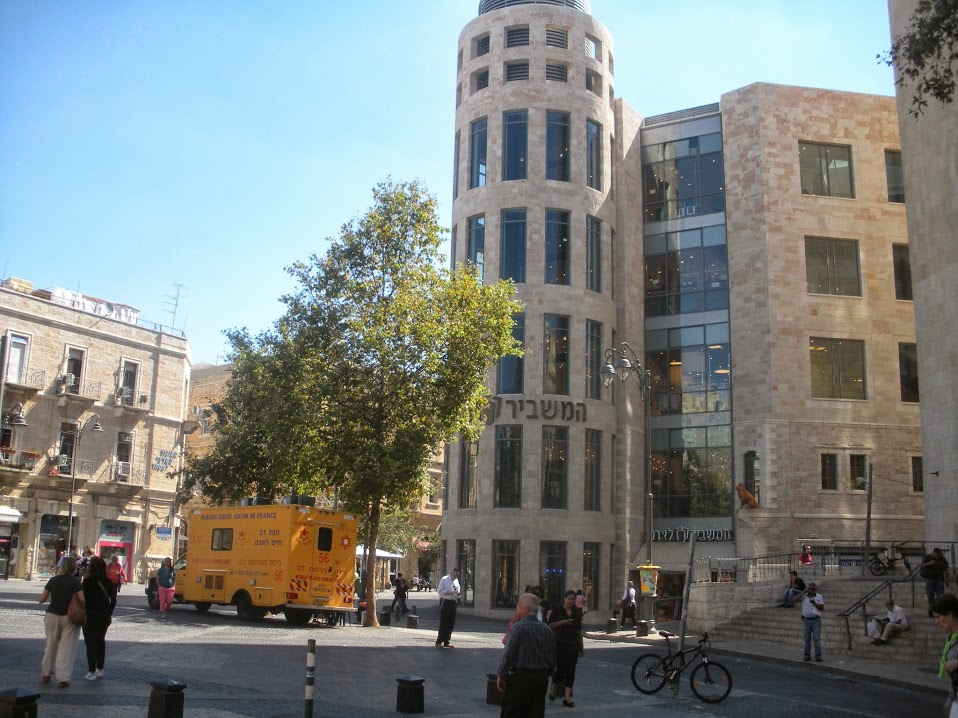
Seven-story Hamashbir store at Zion Square.

The chain was founded by the Histadrut in 1947. In 2003, Rami Shavit and a group of investors acquired the department store chain, operating the company under the new name, New Hamashbir Lazarchan Ltd. In 2007, the company went public on the Tel Aviv Stock Exchange with a NIS 6.6 million stock offering and bonds valued at NIS 50 million.

== Branches ==
In 2011, a new branch of Hamashbir opened at Zion Square in Jerusalem. The 7-story building incorporates elements of two 19th-century historic buildings previously slated for preservation. The building was designed by Jerusalem architect Amazia Aaronson. It faces the square and Jaffa Road.

== See also ==
- Honigman
- Castro (clothing)
- Fox (clothing)
