= Castro (clothing) =

Israeli clothing company

Castro Model Ltd. קסטרו מודל בע"מ
- Company type: Public (TASE: CAST)
- Industry: Fashion
- Founded: Tel Aviv, Israel (1973)
- Headquarters: Bat-Yam, Israel
- Area served: Israel
- Key people: Aharon Castro (Chairman); Gabriel Rotter (CEO, Director); Esther Rotter (CEO, Director); Shay Offir (Executive Vice President)
- Products: clothing, cosmetics, fashion accessories
- Number of employees: 1457 (2016)
- Website: Castro.com

Castro (Hebrew: קסטרו) is an Israeli clothing company specializing in men's and women's fashions. Publicly traded on the Tel Aviv Stock Exchange, the company is valued at 100 million US dollars. In 2013, it was Israel's largest fashion company.

The chain has 180 stores, with locations in Israel, Germany, Russia, Switzerland, Thailand, and Ukraine.

== History ==
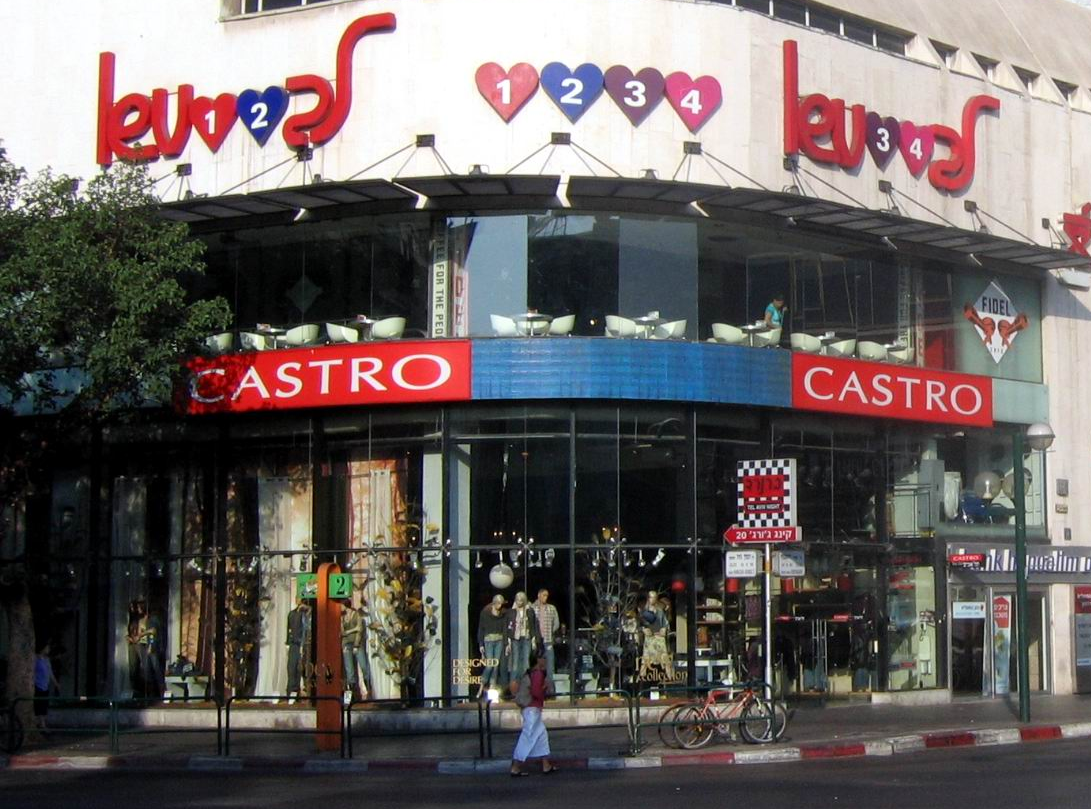
Castro flagship store at Dizengoff Center, Tel Aviv

The company was founded by Aaron Castro, a Sephardic Jew from Thessaloniki, Greece, whose family immigrated to Israel when he was a young boy. His mother, Anina, was a professional dressmaker and designer who sewed for private clients.

In the 1950s, Castro opened a small corner store in Tel Aviv called Nina, named for his mother. As the business grew and the basement of the store became a small factory producing ready-to-wear clothing, the name was changed to Castro. In the 1960s, Castro clothing was also sold at department stores such as Hamashbir Letzarchan and Shekem. In 1965, Castro moved to direct marketing with "Rio", a factory outlet in Tel Aviv.

In 1975, Castro began exporting its clothing to Europe. Castro's flagship store opened on Dizengoff Street in 1985, and branches were established all over the country. By the 1990s, Castro had over 1544 workers. In 1992, Castro filed its IPO, going public. In 1994, Castro launched its cosmetics line through a licensing agreement. Castro has designed the Israeli team uniforms for the Olympics since 1996. Castro won Israel's fashion "Oscar."

In August 2000, Castro opened Castro Men. Also, 2003 saw the beginning of international expansion with stores in Germany. In 2005, Castro entered into a joint (50%) ownership of an international accessories chain, DIVA, with England-based DCK Concessions and today has 23 stores.

In 2007, Castro launched its Castro Jeans line.

Since 2008, Gal Gadot has been a leading model and fashion show host for Castro. In 2014, she appeared in a commercial for Castro's new "Push-Up" jeans, showing her and two backup dancers twerking in the jeans.

In 2013, Castro decided to expand its women's and men's fashion collections and added a children's line. In the same year, the pop singer Ivri Lider designed a men's collection for Castro.

In 2014, Castro opened its online store. The items on the website are sold internationally.

In 2018, Castro bought the Hoodies group outright in a share swap deal, making Castro the largest publicly traded fashion company in the country.

== Spokesmodels ==
- Romi Aboulafia
- Aviv Alush
- Rotem Sela
- Yael Abecassis
- Gal Gadot
- Daniel Litman
- Yael Goldman
- Becky Griffin
- Galit Gutmann
- Bar Refaeli
- Esti Ginzburg
- Melanie Peres
- Neta Alchimister
- Dar Zuzovsky

== See also ==
- Israeli fashion
- Hamashbir Lazarchan
- Honigman
- TNT
- Fox
- Adika (clothing)
