= Milton J. Miller =

American lawyer (1912–2007)

Milton J. Miller (1912 – March 6, 2007) was an American lawyer. He was a cofounder of Honigman LLP.

== Early life and education ==
Miller was born in 1912, in Baltimore, the son of immigrant parents. He grew up in Detroit and graduated from Detroit Central High School, the first public high school established in Detroit and in Michigan. During his time at Detroit Central, he met his future wife, Jeanette Rabinowitz. He graduated from the University of Michigan with an undergraduate degree in 1933. In 1935, he graduated, with honors, from the University of Michigan Law School with a Juris Doctor.

== Career ==
In 1948, with Jason L. Honigman, Miller formed a law firm what is known today as Honigman Miller Schwartz and Cohn. The firm has been headquartered in the First National Building since its founding, which is located in the heart of downtown Detroit directly facing Campus Martius Park.

In practice, Miller was primarily a business lawyer. In addition to his business practice, he also headed the firm’s matrimonial / family law group. As a family law practitioner, he represented many of Detroit’s social elite, including Henry Ford II in his divorce from Cristina Ford in 1980. He was a lifelong member of the State Bar of Michigan, as well as the International Society of Barristers.

Miller was actively involved in the day-to-day operations of the firm until his death.

== Personal life and death ==
In his spare time, Miller was dedicated to his family and was an active tennis player even up to the time of his death. He was deeply involved in many Jewish causes including the Jewish Federation of Metropolitan Detroit. He was also active with the Detroit Symphony Orchestra. He died on March 6, 2007, aged 94, in Franklin, from pancreatic cancer.

In November 2007, Honigman Miller Schwartz and Cohn announced the Jack Miller Memorial Scholarship Fund at the University of Michigan Law School. The fund provides a scholarship to a financially challenged first-year law student from the city of Detroit as well as an opportunity to work as a summer associate at Honigman Miller Schwartz and Cohn. In establishing the fund, the firm’s chief officer, Alan S. Schwartz, was quoted as saying:

We are so proud to be able to celebrate Jack Miller’s amazing life and accomplishments with this gift. This will ensure Jack’s legacy of caring, kindness, and generosity will live on forever.
