= Neta Alchimister =

Israeli model

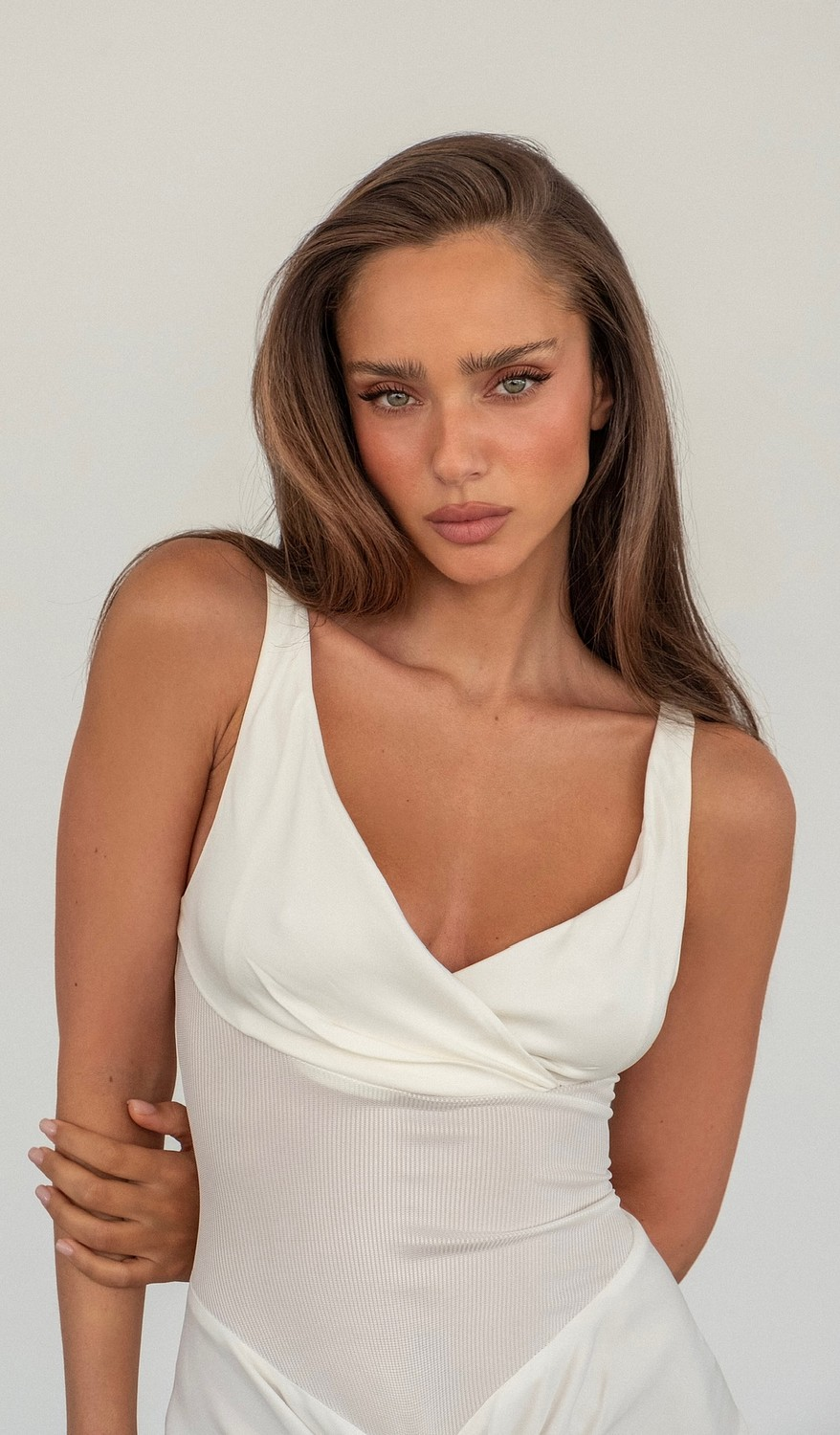
- Alchimister in 2025
- Born: 20 April 1994 (age 32); Rishon LeZion, Israel
- Occupations: Model, businesswoman, influencer
- Years active: 2010–present
- Spouse: Rami Gershon (m. 2019)
- Modeling information
- Height: 1.68 m (5 ft 6 in)
- Hair color: Brown
- Eye color: Green
- Agency: Elite Israel

Neta Alchimister (Hebrew: נטע אלחמיסטר; born 20 April 1994) is an Israeli model, businesswoman, and social media personality.

== Early life ==
Alchimister was born in Rishon LeZion, Israel, to Israeli-born parents of Ashkenazi Jewish (Austrian-Jewish) descent and of both Sephardi Jewish and Mizrahi Jewish (Libyan-Jewish and Algerian-Jewish) descent. Her father is Eyal Alchimister and her mother is Vardi (née Shalom).

She served as soldier in the Israel Defense Forces in the Teleprocessing Corps.

== Modeling and media career ==
Alchimister was discovered as a model in 2009, while a teenager, at the age of 15. After completing her military service, she co-founded the designer swimwear company BaNaNhot with Israeli model Noa Beny, which today sells limited edition designer swimwear around the world.

Since 2015, she has been lead model for Castro. She is the founder of designer swimwear company BaNaNhot.

She is the Israeli with the third most social media followers, after Gal Gadot and Bar Refaeli.

In 2016, she was the cover model for Blazer's swimwear edition.

In 2020, Alchimister was one of the three main judges of Reshet 13's Israeli reality show Comedy Star.

== Personal life ==
In 2014, Alchimister started dating Israeli footballer Rami Gershon. They became engaged in 2018 and married in June 2019. On 23 November, their first son was born.
