= Bar Refaeli =

Israeli actress, model and philanthropist (born 1985)

- בר רפאלי
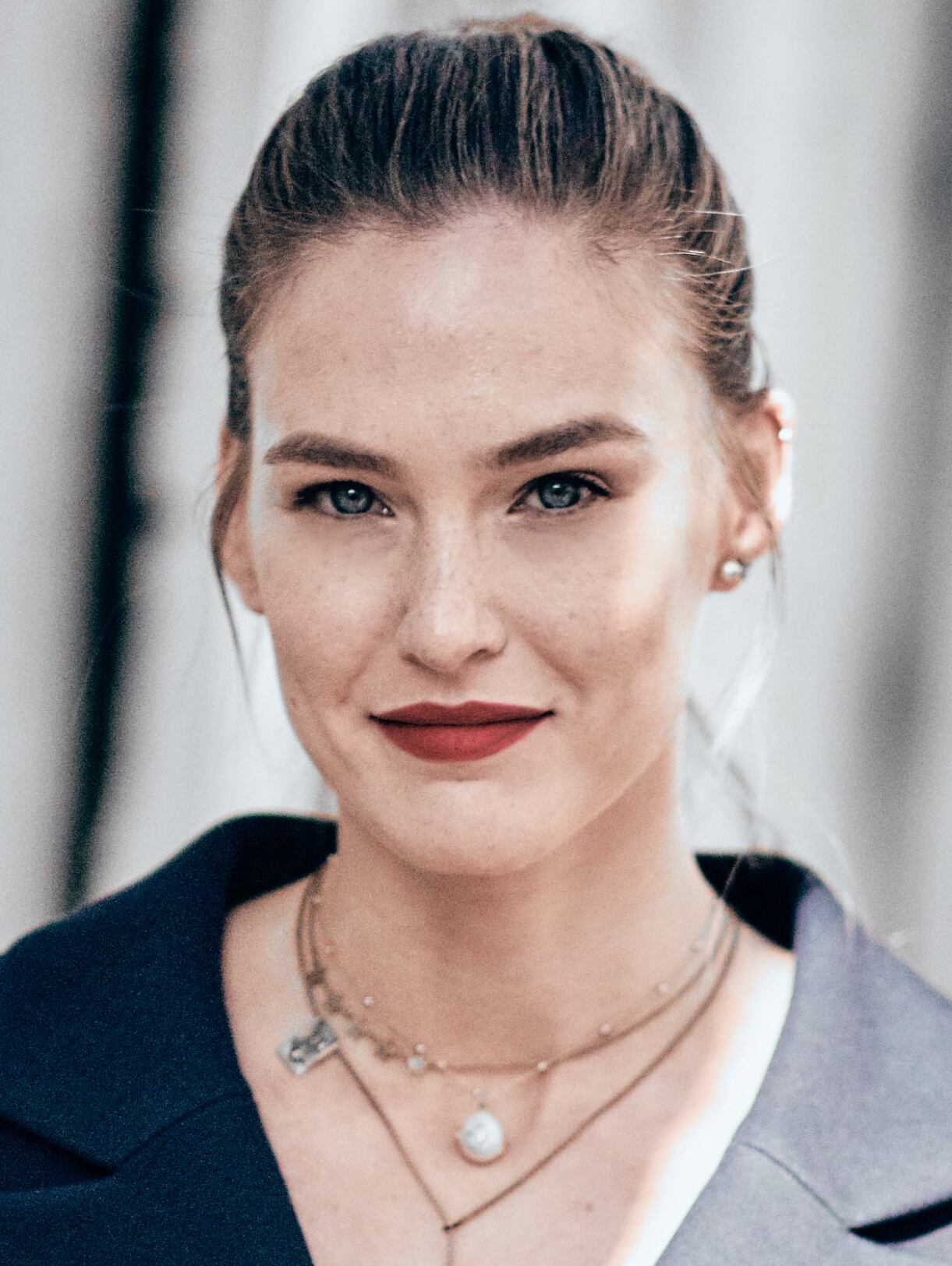
- Refaeli in 2019
- Born: 4 June 1985 (age 41); Hod HaSharon, Israel
- Occupations: actress; model; philanthropist; host
- Spouse(s): Arik Weinstein (m. 2003; div. 2005) Adi Ezra (m. 2015)
- Children: 3
- Modelling information
- Height: 1.75 m (5 ft 9 in)
- Hair colour: Blonde
- Eye colour: Blue
- Agency: List: One Management (New York, Chicago, Los Angeles); Marilyn Agency (Paris); MP Management (Milan); Premier Model Management (London); Uno Models (Barcelona); Scoop Models (Copenhagen); Model Management (Hamburg); PARS Management (Munich); Stockholmsgruppen (Stockholm)

Bar Refaeli (Hebrew: בר רפאלי; born 4 June 1985) is an Israeli actress, model, philanthropist and host. She is among the most internationally successful models to come from Israel, appearing on the cover of the 2009 Sports Illustrated Swimsuit Issue, and being voted No. 1 on Maxim magazine's Hot 100 list of 2012. As a television host, Refaeli has hosted The X Factor Israel since 2013 and co-hosted the Eurovision Song Contest 2019 in Tel Aviv.

As a result of her modeling and investment careers, her net worth was estimated at US$20 million in 2015. She was the highest-paid model in Israel according to Forbes Israel in 2013.

== Early life ==
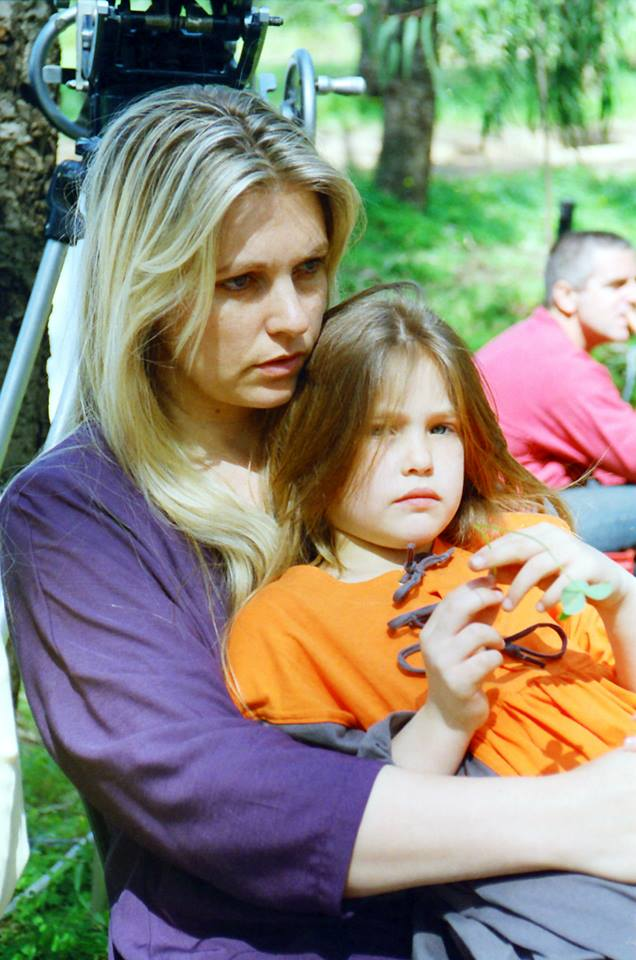
Five-year-old Refaeli with her mother Tzipi in 1990

Refaeli was born and raised in Hod HaSharon, Israel, to a secular Jewish family. In Hebrew, her first name means "wild" (as in wilderness), and her surname literally means "my God heals" and is a derivative of the biblical angel Raphael. Her parents were both born in Israel, and her grandparents were Jewish immigrants from Italy, Lithuania and Poland. Her grandparents were Holocaust survivors. Her father Refael "Rafi" Refaeli is a former horse stable owner, and her mother was a model in the 1970s under her maiden name Tzipora "Tzipi" Levine. Refaeli has two younger brothers; On Refaeli is an actor and model, and Dor Refaeli is an entrepreneur. She also has an older half-brother, Neil Ben-Porat, from her mother's first marriage to Israeli businessman Yehousha "Shuki" Ben-Porat.

== Career ==
=== Modeling ===
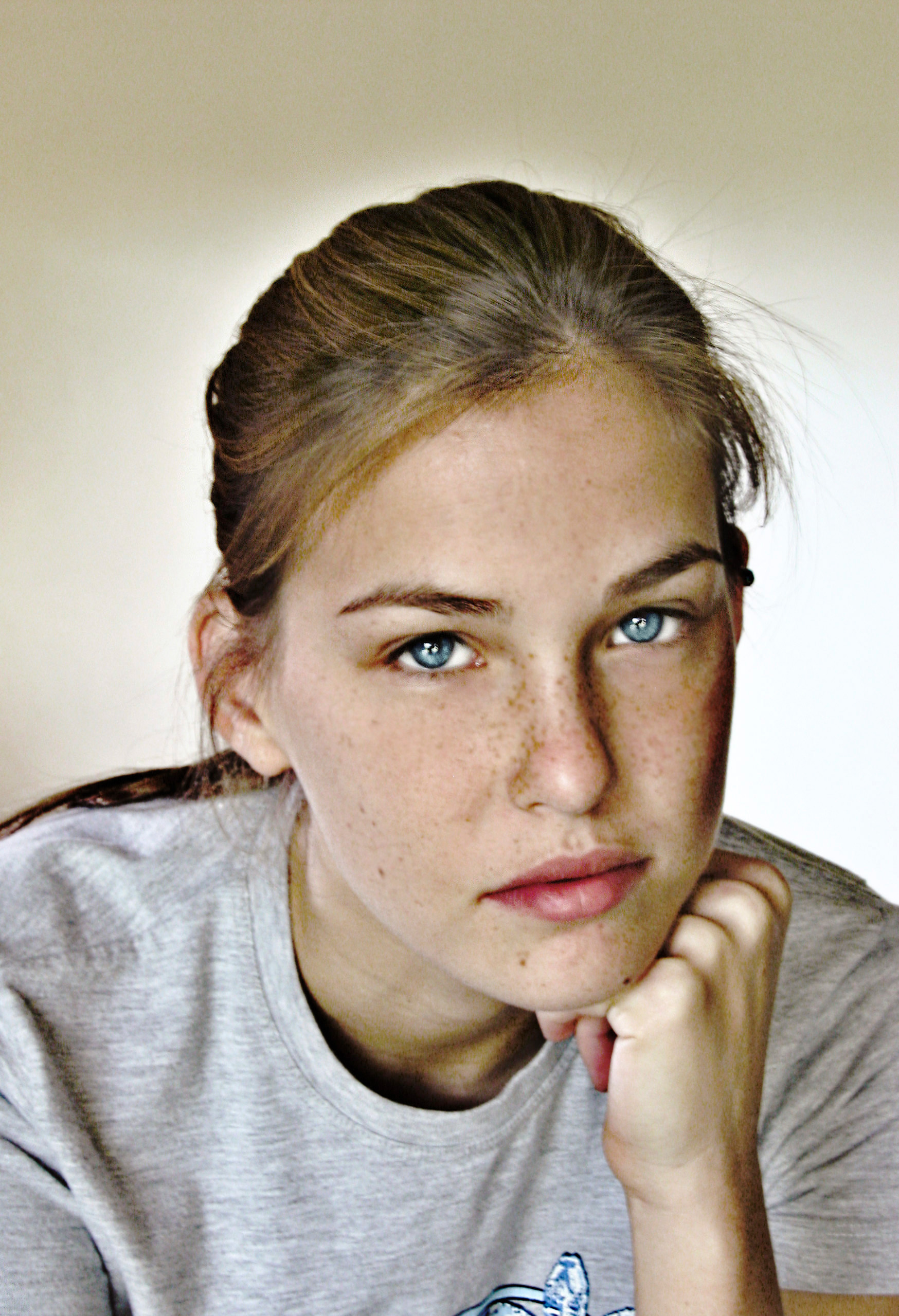
18-year-old Refaeli in 2003

Refaeli began modeling at the age of eight months, when she first appeared in commercials. Orthodonture at 12 interrupted her modeling until she was 15, when an Israeli fashion awards ceremony awarded Refaeli "Model of the Year" (2000). She played prominently in campaigns for the fashion brands Castro and Pilpel, and she starred in a Milky pudding commercial.

She has appeared in editorials for French, American, Italian, Spanish, Russian, and Ukrainian Elle, Spanish Vogue, British, Russian, Australian, and Vietnamese Harper's Bazaar, V, French and Dutch L'Officiel, American, British, Italian, German, Spanish, and Indian GQ, i-D, and Allure. She has appeared on the covers of French, Italian, Spanish, Dutch, Russian, Belgian, Danish, Swedish, Australian, Latvian, Norwegian, Polish, Bulgarian, Romanian, Slovenian, Croatian, and Turkish Elle, French, Spanish, and Russian Marie Claire, British, Italian, Spanish, German, Portuguese, and Mexican GQ, American, British, Australian, and Serbian Maxim, and Esquire.

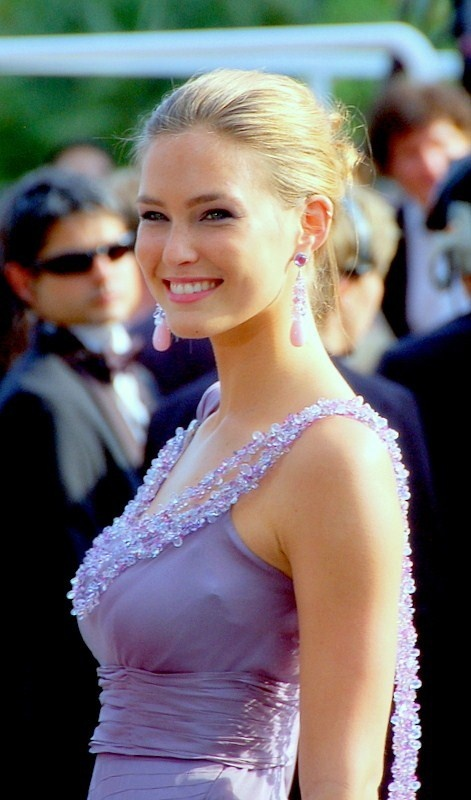
Refaeli at the 2008 Cannes Film Festival

Refaeli has appeared in advertising campaigns for Chanel, Escada, Ralph Lauren, Desigual, Andrew Marc, Victoria's Secret, Marks and Spencer, Gap, Moët & Chandon, Hurley, Rampage, True Religion, Lucky Brand, Accessorize, Passionata, Fox, Reebok, Sears, Arrow, Besni, Marco Bicego, and Agua Bendita. She also has appeared in advertising-campaigns for non-fashion brands such as Garnier Fructis, Samsung, and Subaru.

Refaeli became the second Israeli model to appear in Sports Illustrated magazine (after Michaela Bercu), in her 2007 debut in its Swimsuit Issue, where she posed with the rock band Aerosmith. Refaeli was the cover-model for the 2009 Sports Illustrated Swimsuit Issue. In a promotional deal with Sports Illustrated, Southwest Airlines painted a bikini-clad Refaeli from that shoot on the side of its Boeing 737, which led some passengers to criticize the airline for plastering a picture they regarded as prurient, and hence "offensive to families."

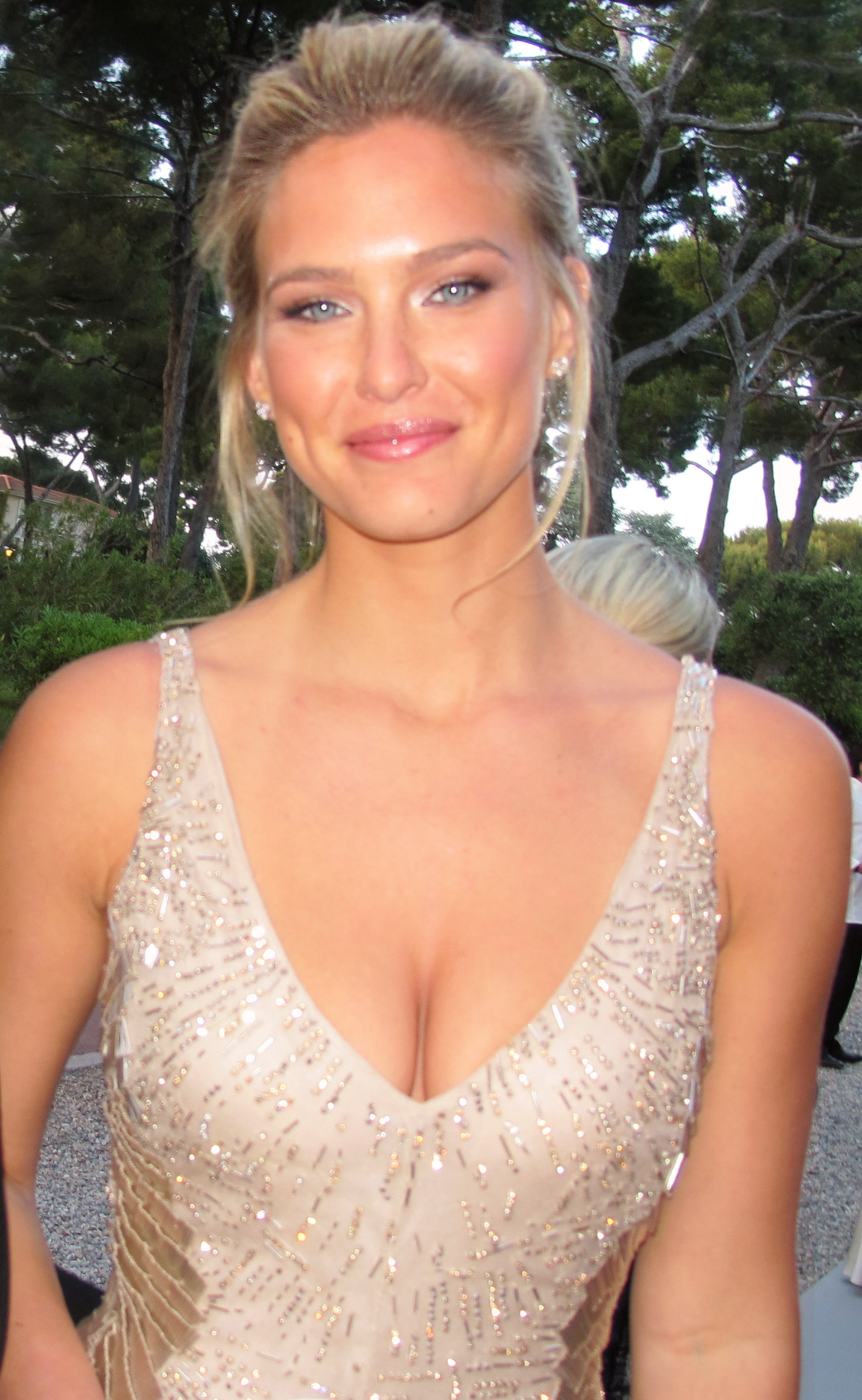
Bar Refaeli in 2011

Refaeli has modeled for Subaru, Accessorize, Brazilian clothing line Besni, Italian jewelry line Marco Bicego, and Rampage. In 2009, she modeled for Garnier International.

On 5 March 2009, Refaeli received the World Style Award presented by the Women's World Awards for her "natural elegance, sense of style, and compassion." In October of the same year, Refaeli co-hosted Fashionable Istanbul's press conference, announced its October 2009 fashion event, and appeared in its advèrtisements. FHM voted Refaeli No. 42 in 2008, No. 57 in 2010, and No. 97 in 2011, in its lists of the "100 Sexiest Women."

Maxim placed Refaeli at the very top of its Hot 100 list in 2012. In April 2012, Shalom Life ranked her fourth on its list of the "50 most talented, intelligent, funny, and gorgeous Jewish women in the world."

According to Forbes Israel, in 2013 she was the highest-paid model in Israel, ahead of the combined modelling income of such other Israeli models as Esti Ginzburg, Gal Gadot, and Shlomit Malka.

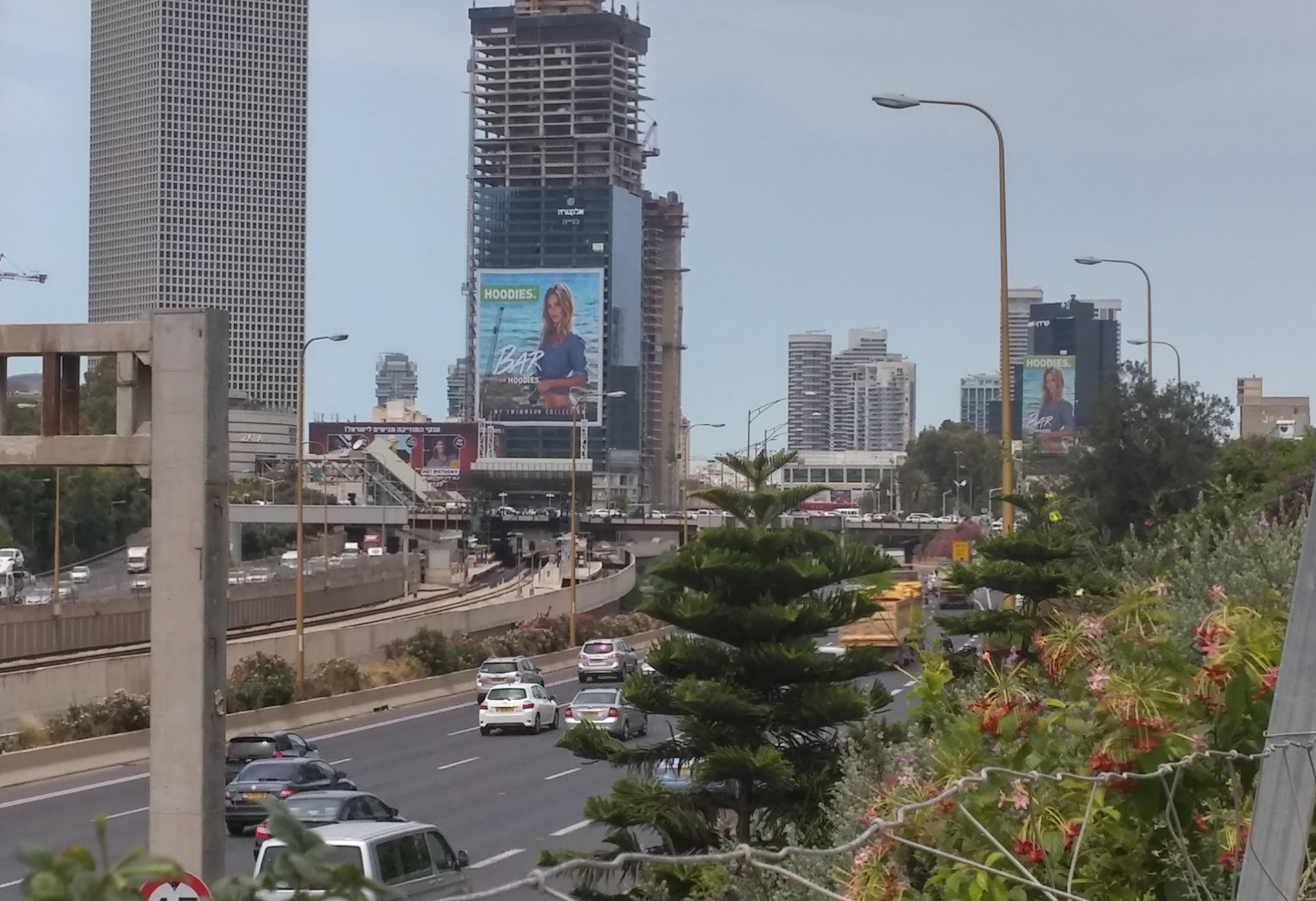
A commercial featuring Refaeli on a major highway billboard in Israel

In 2013 she also received a Vienna Fashion Award in the category of "Style-Icon".

As of March 2017, Refaeli was the second most influential person on Israeli Instagram, according to the Israeli Internet Association, behind Anna Zak, but ahead of Neta Alchimister.

=== Business and investment ===
Refaeli has an ownership stake in a number of Israeli fashion companies, such as in the designer glasses manufacturer Carolina Lemke. In September 2018 it was announced that Kim Kardashian would be the face of the brand alongside Refaeli, with the two appearing in a promotional campaign together.

On the sale of a 5% stake to Israeli fashion brand Castro in 2016, Refaeli made a NIS 2-4 million profit.

In 2011, Refaeli and Dudi Balsar, an Israeli attorney and former male model, set up an E-commerce company called Under.me, to sell designer underwear. As well as being its investor, Refaeli runs business development for the venture. By November 2011, the company had raised $1 million in venture capital funds.

In 2013, her startup Mika Look, which is an iPad app that allows users to purchase the items that models are wearing, raised $1.2 million in its first financing round.

Refaeli is one of the main investors behind MyCheck, which processes payments behind smart phones, and which raised $1.7 million in its first financing round. In its second financing round, it raised $4.2 million.

=== Other work in the entertainment industry ===
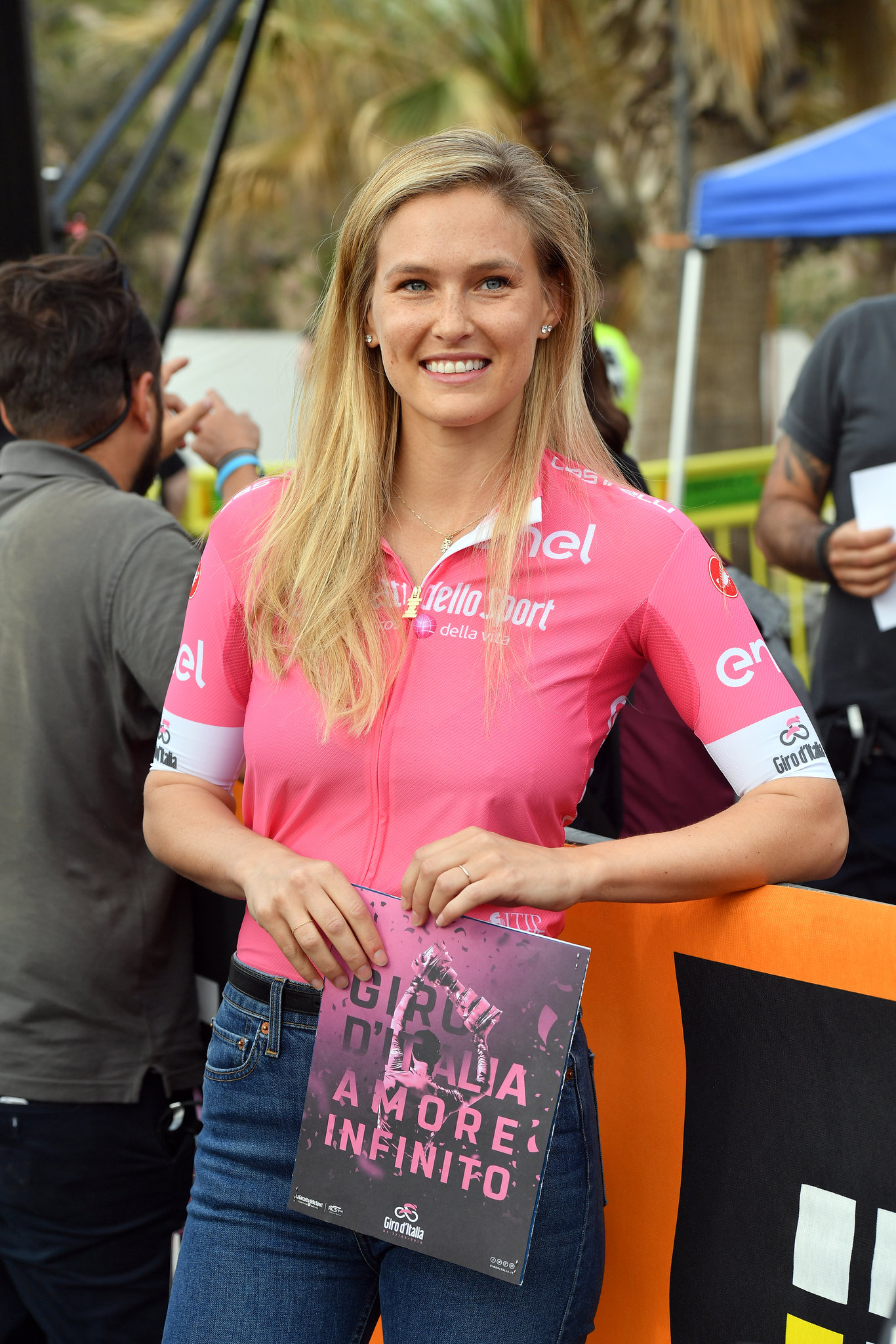
Refaeli at the team presentation of 2018 Giro d'Italia in Jerusalem

Refaeli co-starred in the Israeli TV drama series Pick Up in 2005. In October 2008, she co-hosted the Bravo special program Tommy Hilfiger Presents Ironic Iconic America, based on the book Ironic Iconic America written by George Lois. She returned as a program host in 2009, this time for MTV's brief revival of House of Style.

In 2009, she was also a guest-judge at Project Runway Israel.

Refaeli participated in a campaign to help reduce the use of plastic bags in Israel. In 2009, she led an unpaid campaign on behalf of the Israel Water Authority, to educate the public about water use and conservation.

In 2011, Refaeli starred in the American-Israeli film Session, directed by Haim Bouzaglo. The film is a psychological thriller that tells the story of a manipulative psychiatrist who becomes obsessed with a new young patient. She also served as a guest judge on cycle four of Germany's Next Topmodel hosted by Heidi Klum. In November 2012 she started her own model casting show Million Dollar Shootingstar on German TV Channel Sat.1.

In late 2012, she played the titular role in Cinderella, a musical adaptation staged for Channukkah in Israel.

In January 2013, Refaeli appeared in Go Daddy's Super Bowl XLVII commercial, acting with Jesse Heiman (with whom she intimately kisses) and NASCAR driver and perennial GoDaddy pitchwoman Danica Patrick.

On 7 June 2013, Refaeli hosted a beach party in Tel Aviv for participants of Tel Aviv Pride, the city's gay pride parade. In November 2013, she spoke out in support of legislation for civil marriages in Israel, as part of a campaign for the proposed Knesset bill. In 2013, Refaeli also hosted the first season of The X Factor Israel, which became the most popular music show in Israel, leading to them bringing her back in 2015 for season two. In 2018 Refaeli appeared in a music video of X Factor judge, Ivri Lider. In 2013, Refaeli played a starring role in the French-Israeli crime-caper film Kidon, a comedy in which she stars as a Mossad assassin involved in liquidating a terrorist.

Refaeli hosted the closing ceremony for the 2017 Maccabiah Games in Latrun, Israel, on 18 July 2017.

Assi Azar reportedly wrote the hit Israeli TV series Beauty and the Baker with Refaeli in mind for the lead role. Rotem Sela eventually played the role that Refaeli reportedly turned down. Refaeli and Azar, formerly close friends, stopped speaking afterward.

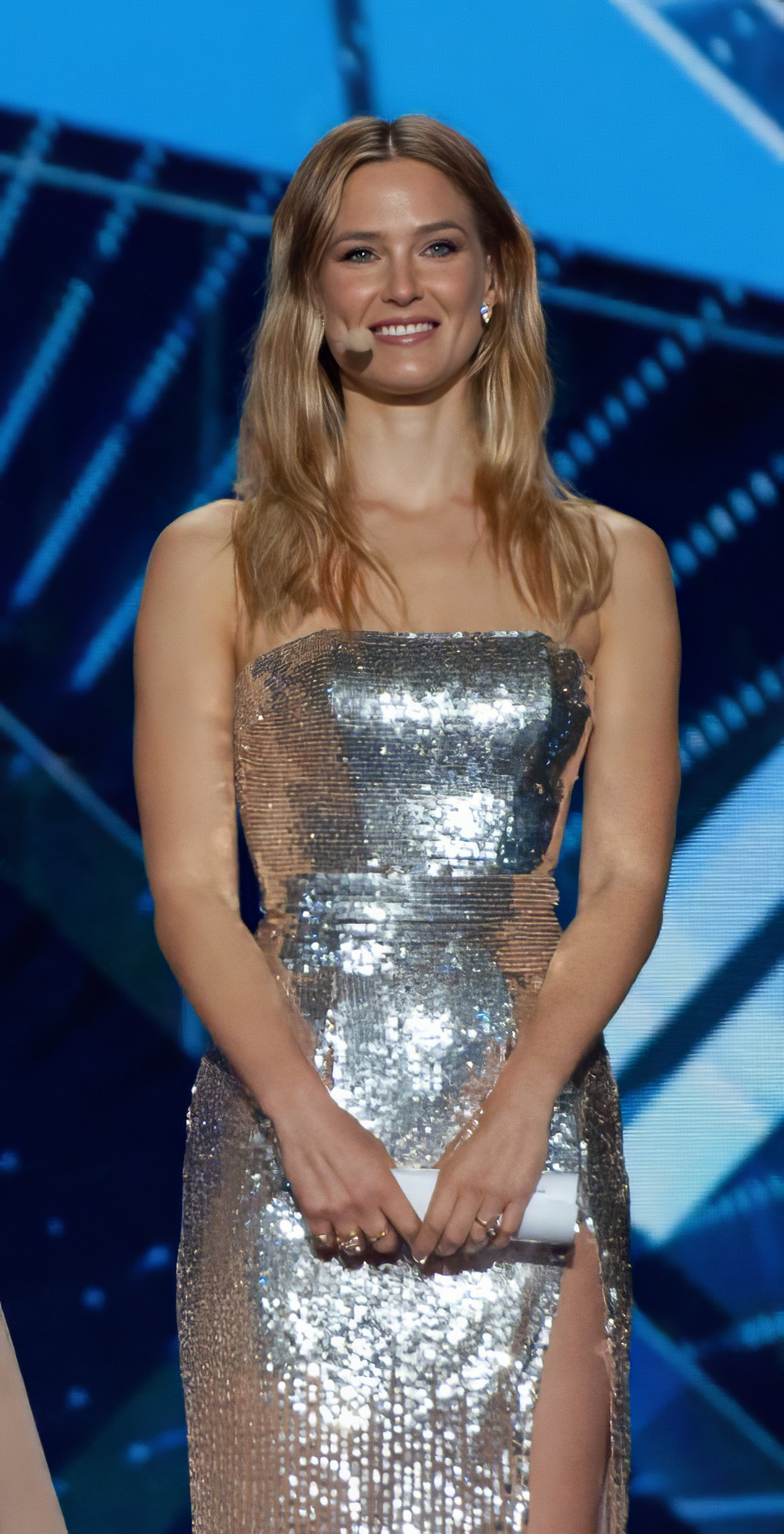
Refaeli hosting the Eurovision Song Contest 2019 in Tel Aviv

Refaeli hosted the main event of the Eurovision Song Contest 2019 in Tel Aviv alongside Erez Tal, whereas Assi Azar and Lucy Ayoub hosted the Green Room (Artists' backstage).

== Controversies ==
=== Draft evasion ===
As early as 2004, Refaeli received criticism in her country for avoiding its mandatory service in the army. At the time, fellow Israeli model Agam Rudberg said: "The way Bar Refaeli evaded army-service wasn't right. It's worth trying to serve in the army, and only if you don't feel good there to try to do something."

In 2007, Ynetnews reported that Refaeli had evaded the draft by marrying family-acquaintance Arik Weinstein in 2003, and divorcing him soon afterwards. Military service in the Israel Defense Forces (IDF) is mandatory in Israel for unmarried secular Jewish women over the age of 18.

The Israeli Forum for the Promotion of Equal Share in the Burden threatened to boycott the Israeli fashion chain Fox if they hired her. The two sides reached a compromise in which Refaeli agreed to visit injured IDF soldiers whenever she was in Israel, and actively encourage army enlistment. Refaeli later said, "I don't regret not enlisting, because it paid off big time. That's just the way it is: celebrities have other needs. I hope my case has influenced the army." She also said: "Israel or Uganda, what difference does it make? It makes no difference to me. Why is it good to die for our country? What, isn't it better to live in New York? Why should 18-year-old kids have to die? It's dumb that people have to die so that I can live in Israel."

In 2009, while speaking in support of enlisting, fellow Israeli model Esti Ginzburg also criticized Refaeli for evading military-service. Two years later, Refaeli was featured on the cover of Italian GQ's war-themed May 2011 issue. Refaeli's avoidance of military service was again raised in 2013, this time by IDF Brigadier General Yoav Mordechai, who criticized the Ministry of Foreign Affairs for casting her in a 2013 advertisement. Mordechai maintained that the use of Refaeli as an "official representative of Israel" sent a "negative message" to Israeli society.

Ever since 2014, during the IDF's Operation Protective Edge (2014 Gaza War), Refaeli has frequently expressed solidarity and appreciation of fellow Israeli citizens who have been serving in the Israeli military while posting on her social network accounts; one of which was done by simply sharing her own photos hugging young and cheerful combat Israeli troops.

Following the October 7 attacks on Israel in 2023, Refaeli, expressed her "anguish and fear for her country", and expressed support for Israel in the ensuing Gaza war, calling for international solidarity with Israel in its efforts to "bring back its kidnapped sons and daughters". She later criticized Gigi Hadid for calling attention to Israel's detainment of Palestinian children. In December 2023, Refaeli visited wounded Israeli soldiers in hospital, to show her gratitude for their service.

=== Tax evasion ===
In late 2015, Refaeli was accused of concealing millions of shekels of annual income, despite an estimated net worth of US$20 million in 2015. It was revealed she had recently bought a NIS 15 million apartment in Tel Aviv, as well as a NIS 2.5 million apartment for her younger brother. On 16 December 2015, Israeli tax authorities in Tel Aviv detained her and her mother overnight for questioning related to potential tax evasion; she was accused of failing to pay income tax on two vehicles that she received as compensation for posing in pictures with the vehicles, and for evading taxes by disguising her Israeli residency by renting a luxury apartment in Tel Aviv through relatives.

On 3 January 2019, it was announced that Refaeli was suspected of tax-evasion and was facing a possible indictment along with her parents. In April 22, 2019, Refaeli's appeal was rejected and she was ordered to pay taxes on her concealed income of $4.5 million. She accepted a plea bargain which included a prison sentence for her mother, Tzipi Levine-Refaeli, and heavy fines for them both. Refaeli was sentenced in June 2020 to 9 months of community service in the form of volunteer work at an educational facility for mentally disabled adults, fined $720,000, and made to pay the $2.3 million in back-taxes she owed. Her mother was given a 16-month-long prison sentence, of which she served 8 months at Neve Tirza Prison in Ramla, and fined as well.

== Personal life ==
In 2003, Refaeli married family friend Arik Weinstein. Refaeli was criticized for the marriage as it was widely reported she only married Weinstein in order to avoid being drafted into the Israel Defense Forces. They divorced sometime in 2005. Weinstein published a memoir about their marriage, titled The Untold Story: by Arik Weinstein First Husband of Bar Refaeli, in 2017.

In November 2005, Refaeli began a relationship with American actor Leonardo DiCaprio, after meeting him at a party in Las Vegas for members of U2. In the course of their trip to Israel in March 2007, the couple met Israeli President Shimon Peres and visited her hometown of Hod HaSharon. The relationship ended in June 2009. In 2010, numerous reports indicated that their romance had been rekindled, but in May 2011, it was reported that they had ended their romantic relationship and would remain friends.

She married Israeli businessman Adi Ezra on 24 September 2015 in Israel. They have two daughters and a son.

== Filmography ==
=== Film ===
Year	Title	Role
1992	Amazing Grace	Kindergarten Child
2010	Shir Al Hayam	Female Surfer
2011	Session	Eden
2013	Kidon	Einav

=== Television ===
Year	Title	Role
1994	Kofiko	Iris
2005	Pick Up	Noa Zuckerman
2005	Eretz Nehederet	Efi Midaber's Aunt
2019	Eurovision Song Contest 2019	Presenter

== See also ==
- Israeli fashion
