= Hayley Marie Kohle =

Canadian fashion model

- Born: May 6, 1982; Beausejour, Manitoba, Canada
- Died: October 11, 2008 (aged 26); Milan, Italy
- Cause of death: Suicide
- Modeling information
- Height: 1.79 m (5 ft 10 1/2 in)
- Hair color: Blonde
- Eye color: Blue

Hayley Marie Kohle (May 6, 1982 – October 11, 2008) was a Canadian fashion model active in the 2000s. She worked internationally with contracts with agencies in Canada, United States, Greece, Italy, Turkey, Germany and the United Kingdom, before dying by suicide at the age of 26.

== Career ==
Kohle was born in Beausejour, Manitoba. According to Kohle's main agency Panache Management, she began her modelling career in 2000, while according to her sister Bridget, she began her career in 2002 after winning a local model search contest.

She was represented by agencies in Toronto, New York, Athens, Istanbul, Milan, Hamburg and London. Based in these cities, she had modelled internationally for seven years by 2008.

== Death ==
On October 11, 2008, Kohle was found dead in Italy. She died after falling from the seventh-floor balcony of an apartment at Milan, and Italian police ruled it a suicide by jumping. She had been there for just over a year after signing a contract with a modelling agency through the Panache modelling agency in Winnipeg. She was 26.

Ugo Besozzi, head of Future Models, the Milan-based agency Kohle joined in January 2008, was quoted as saying, "Everyone said the same thing: At one point she said that she was going to smoke a cigarette. She opened the window and drastically took that decision. There was no warning and nobody could have done anything about it."

Kohle's sister Bridget checked Hayley's e-mail account and could see the last message Hayley sent was one to her, just days before her death, which said she was very excited about good news she had received about a big modelling job.

A memorial for Kohle was held on October 20 at St. Mary's Catholic Church in Beausejour.

=== Discussion ===
Some have referred to her death as a case in a "series of tragedies" ongoing in the fashion industry at the time, along with the suicides of Ambrose Olsen, Daul Kim, Ruslana Korshunova, and Lina Marulanda, as well as Noemie Lenoir's suicide attempt.
