= Melanie Peres =

Israeli model and actress

- מלאני פרס
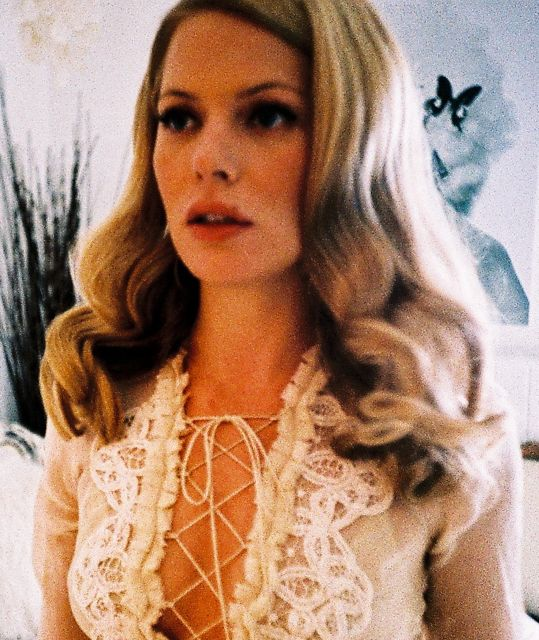
- Peres (2008)
- Born: Melanie Mariam Thanee Frasch; December 1, 1971 (age 54); West Berlin, West Germany
- Occupations: Model, Actress, Singer
- Years active: 1989–present
- Spouse: Itay Tiran (m. 2008; sep. 2023)

Melanie Mariam Thanee Frasch (born December 1, 1971), better known as Melanie Peres (Hebrew: מלאני פרס) is a German-born Israeli model, actress, and singer. She began modeling in 1989 and has acted in Israeli television series and films; she played the title role in the 2010 Israeli feature film Naomi.

== Early life ==
Peres was born in West Berlin, West Germany to a Christian father Peter, and Jewish mother Nurith Frasch. After her parents separated when she was 3 years old, she stayed with her father. At 15, under difficult relationship circumstances where her father remarried, she left and immigrated to Israel to join her mother; she stayed at an absorption center in Upper Nazareth. Peres mentioned in interviews that the move was a traumatic experience. Although her mother was born in Israel, Peres was not accustomed to the differences in mentality, and did not speak a word of Hebrew at the time of her immigration.

== Career ==
At 16, Peres quit school and moved from Nazareth to Tel Aviv, where she worked as a cleaner and a waitress until she began modeling in 1989. Raz Yuvan of Haaretz remarked, "Over the years, she advanced from modeling bathing suits to the top of the industry." As a model, she traveled around the world, and by 2010 had worked in the industry for more than 20 years. In a Haaretz interview, she said, "When I was young and people would ask me what I did, I used to answer: 'I work in the meat market.' I was embarrassed to make money from posing, and especially troubled by the fact that I lacked a proper education; but I had to work and couldn't support myself and study at the same time." She said, "I assume every profession has pluses and minuses. It enabled me to live and to live well - it gave me a good career, a lot of confidence in certain things, and it opened doors for me."

In 1998, Peres sang a duet with Yahli Sobol called "Hodaot" (Hebrew: הודעות; "Messages"). In 2000, she made her acting debut with a lead role in the TV movie Abbaleh. She made several guest appearances on Israeli television in series such as Ha Burganim (The Bourgeoisie), and Tik Sagur (Case Closed).

Over her career she appeared in campaigns for Israeli fashion brands including Castro and Bonita. In 2006, the fashion brand Honigman asked her to represent the company. Peres served as its spokesmodel for seven seasons, until January 2010, and designed an eponymous clothing line for their spring-summer collection. Honigman planned to market the line in the manner of Kate Moss's designer collaborations.

Peres participated in the album 30, which was written and produced by Sagi Tzoref and Elad Cohen. Her single "Larutz Maher" (Hebrew: לרוץ מהר; "Running Fast") was a duet with Sobol. She also sang with Eviatar Banai and Assaf Amdursky. Viva Sarah Press of The Jerusalem Post considered "Larutz Maher" one of the most overplayed songs of the year.

Peres has also been involved in films. She cameoed as a UN volunteer in The Syrian Bride, and had the lead role in Beshamayim Aherim (Different Sky), the latter of which showed at the Haifa International Film Festival. On television, she had a guest appearance in Ha Chaverim Shel Naor (Naor's Friends). In Parashat Hashavua (Weekly Story), she played the role of Ronit Elkabetz's lover. She played one of the leading roles in the parody Telenovela Ba'am (Miniseries Ltd). In response to why she did not act earlier in her career, she said that she struggled with her confidence in pronunciation, and was afraid to speak in advertisements because of it: "I am still aware of my shortcomings and my ability to pronounce certain words is a bit problematic even today, but I've learned to live with it. That's beside the fact that I am a perfectionist and very anxious."

In 2008, Peres did a cover of the Tears for Fears song "Mad World", which was produced by Assaf Amdursky for the soundtrack of Reshef Levi's film Lost Islands. In 2008, she was voted Israel's sexiest woman.

In 2009, Peres teamed up with producer Oriana Givoli-Gniger, a former colleague in the modeling industry, on Tevat Noah (Noah's Ark), a TV series about group therapy, where she played a lead role opposite Mark Ivanir. Givoli-Gniger remarked, "When I read the role of Asia, I told Rani Blair immediately that it had to be Melanie, and I persisted. There is no greater joy than getting a good friend to do a significant role that fits her so perfectly."

In 2010, Peres starred as Naomi in Eitan Zur's film Hitparzut X (Naomi), written by bestselling author and theater director Edna Mazia, based on her novel. Naomi was selected for the Critics' Week section of the 67th Venice Film Festival in 2010.

In 2012, Peres played Daniela, the wife of Amos Tamam's character, in Rani Blair's yes drama series Shvita (Strike). In an interview at the time, she said she did not pursue auditions and did not consider herself an actress. In 2014, after about four years away from modeling, she returned for a campaign for jewelry designer Tovi Farber.

== Personal life ==
In a 2010 interview with Haaretz, Peres said she enjoyed horses and life away from the modeling world, but remained open to acting work.

In 2007, Peres met actor Itay Tiran, who is eight years her junior. The couple married in 2008, in a ceremony held in the garden of Shulamit Aloni's home. They initially lived in central Tel Aviv, and by 2015 had moved to the moshav of Sitriya, where Peres raised Arabian horses. In 2020 they moved to Germany, where Peres breeds horses on a farm. The couple separated in 2023 after 15 years together. Peres has remained on the farm, where she keeps horses and makes handmade crafts in a studio on the property.

== Discography ==
- "Hodaot" (Hebrew: הודעות; "Messages") with Yahli Sobol (1998) – single on Sobol's solo album Sus (Hebrew: סוס; Horse)
- "Larutz Maher" (Hebrew: לרוץ מהר; "Running Fast") with Yahli Sobol (2006) – single on the Sagi Tzoref and Elad Cohen album 30
- "Mad World" (2008) – cover of the Tears for Fears song

== Filmography ==
=== Television ===
List of acting performances in television
Title	Year	Role	Notes
Abbaleh (Dear Dad)	2000	Betty	TV movie, lead role, debut
Ha Burganim (The Bourgeoisie)	2000	model	
Tik Sagur (Case Closed)	2002	The Dutch girl	
Telenovela Ba'am (Miniseries Ltd.)	2005	Shira	lead role
Ha Chaverim Shel Naor (Naor's Friends)	2007	Carny	
Screenz	2007	Cordelia	
Parashat Hashavua (Weekly Story)	2008	Marianna	Ronit Elkabetz's lover
Tevat Noah (Noah's Ark)	2009	Asia	lead role
Shvita (Strike)	2012	Daniela	

=== Film ===
List of acting performances in film
Title	Year	Role	Notes
Hakala Hasurit (The Syrian Bride)	2004	Liv	cameo appearance
Beshamayim Aherim (Different Sky)	2006	Isabella	lead role
Hitparzut X (lit. Outbreak X, An X-Ray Burst) (Naomi)	2010	Naomi	title character
