= Ambrose Olsen =

American male fashion model (1984–2010)

- Born: November 27, 1984; Homer, Alaska, United States
- Died: April 22, 2010 (aged 25); New York City, United States
- Occupations: Fashion model, supermodel
- Modeling information
- Height: 5 ft 10 in (178 cm)
- Hair color: Brown
- Eye color: Blue
- Agency: Click Management (as of 2010)

Ambrose Olsen (November 27, 1984 – April 22, 2010) was an American male fashion model. He was known for appearing in dozens of ad campaigns for Armani and Hugo Boss.

== Early life ==
Ambrose Olsen (sometimes also written as Olson) was born in Homer, Alaska. Prior to modeling, he studied to be a carpenter. He also practiced surfing, boxing, and hockey as sports and planned to volunteer for the US Navy. He began modeling at the age of 17, moving to New York City in 2002.

== Modeling ==
Olsen appeared in many print ads and a few runway shows and a few fashion videos. At time of death he was represented by the Click Management modeling agency. He was best known for his 2007 Armani Exchange ads with Adriana Lima. He also worked for numerous other brands such as TNT, Hugo Boss, D&G, Nautica, Yves Saint Laurent, Dior, Louis Vuitton, Burberry, Giorgio Armani Extreme Attitude among others. He also did the catwalk on shows by Alexandre Herchcovitch and Kim Jones among others.

=== Major advertising campaigns ===
- 2003: Hugo Boss ad campaign with Raquel Zimmermann
- 2005: D&G on request of Steven Klein
- 2006: Nautica print ads
- 2006: Dior Homme skin care
- 2007: Armani Exchange
- 2009: Extreme Attitude fragrance by Giorgio Armani (contract)

=== Major magazine appearances ===
- 2003: VMAN magazine photographed and videotaped by Hedi Slimane
- January 2005: On cover of Têtu
- Sept 2005: On cover of Wonderland with Solange Wilvert and Sessilee Lopez
- Spring-Summer 2007: Numéro Homme photographed by Camilla Akrans
- May 2007: Out editorial photographed by François Rousseau
- Fall 2007: GQ Style photographed by Aldo Rossi
- Fall 2007: VMAN magazine photographed by Hedi Slimane
- Spring 2008: VMAN Magazine feature
- Spring 2008: Very Elle with Leelee Sobieski photographed by Doug Inglish

== Death ==
Olsen died on April 22, 2010. He was discovered hanged, in his apartment in New York City. According to police reports, it was a suicide.
