= Solange Wilvert =

Brazilian model (born 1989)

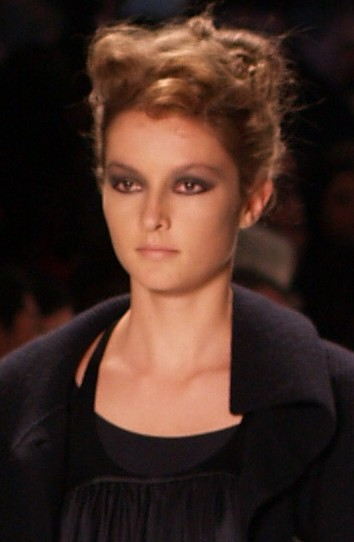
- Wilvert at the New York Fashion Week in 2007
- Born: September 1, 1989 (age 37); Florianópolis, Santa Catarina, Brazil
- Occupation: Model
- Years active: 2003–present
- Modeling information
- Height: 1.83 m (6 ft 0 in)
- Hair color: Brown
- Eye color: Hazel
- Agency: View Management (Barcelona); IMM Bruxelles (Brussels); Modelwerk (Hamburg); Munich Models (Munich); MIKAs (Stockholm); Stage Tokyo Model Agency (Tokyo)

Solange Wilvert (born September 1, 1989) is a Brazilian model.

== Biography ==
Wilvert was born in Florianópolis, Santa Catarina, Brazil. She was discovered during a casting session at her public school in Florianópolis. She was only 14 years old at the time, but in only four weeks she had landed a contract in New York City. Solange has Swiss origins.

== Modelling career ==
She has appeared on the catwalk for high designers Chanel, Alexander McQueen, Marc Jacobs, Karl Lagerfeld, and more. She was the face of Chanel, Calvin Klein, Fendi, Gucci, Stella McCartney, and others. She was on the cover of Stiletto, Vogue (3 times), and Wonderland.
