= Esti Ginzburg =

Israeli model

Esti Ginzburg אסתי גינזבורג
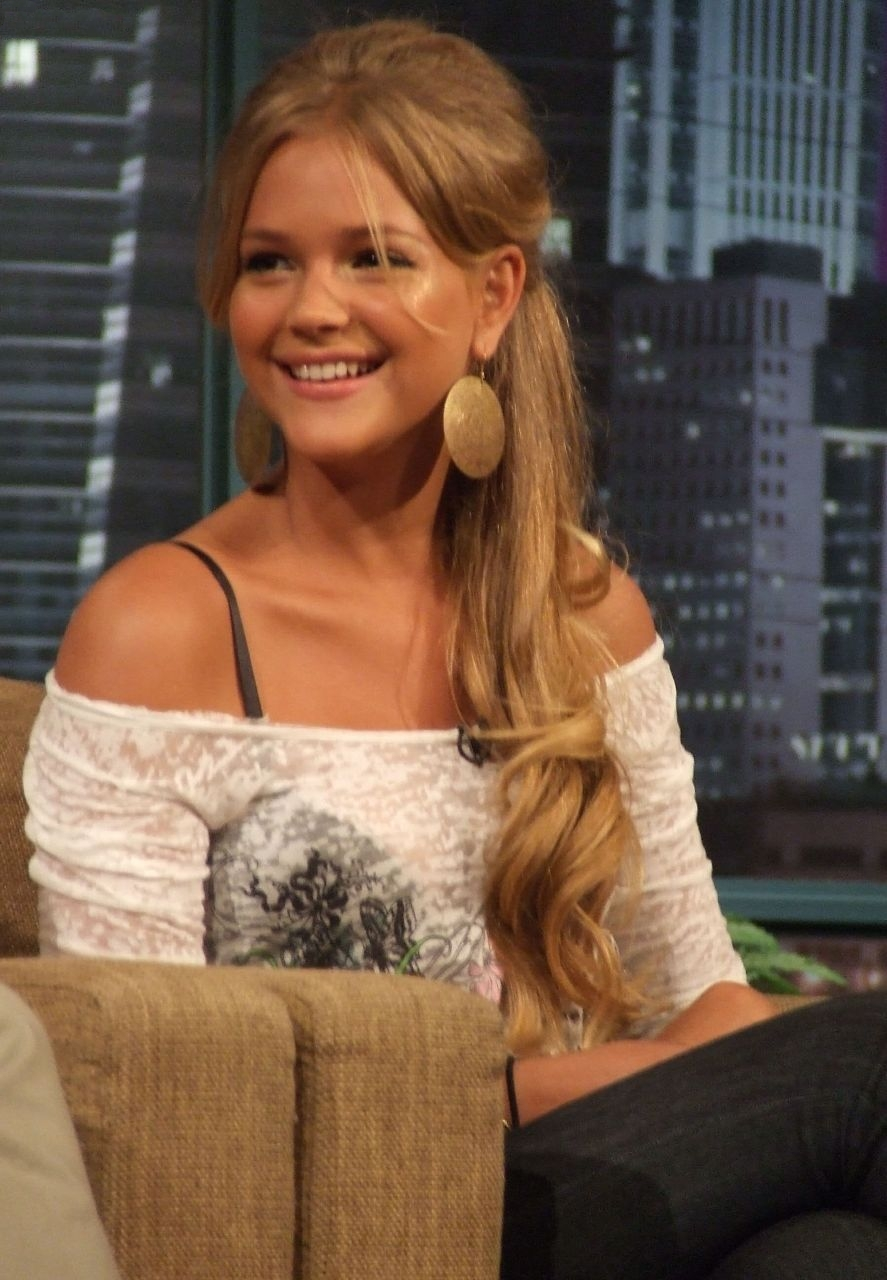
- Ginzburg in 2007
- Born: Esther Daphna Ginzburg; 6 March 1990 (age 36); Tel Aviv, Israel
- Spouse: Adi Keizman (m. 2012)
- Children: 2
- Modeling information
- Height: 1.73 m (5 ft 8 in)
- Hair color: Blonde
- Eye color: Green
- Agency: Elite Model Israel

Esther Daphna "Esti" Ginzburg-Keizman (Hebrew: אסתי גינזבורג; born 6 March 1990) is an Israeli model. She has modeled in international campaigns for fashion brands such as Tommy Hilfiger, Burberry, FCUK, Pull and Bear. She was also featured in the 2009, 2010, and 2011 Sports Illustrated Swimsuit Issue. According to Forbes Israel, she was ranked third among the top ten highest paid models in Israel in 2013, below the two top Israeli models Bar Refaeli and Gal Gadot.

== Early life ==
Esther Daphna Ginzburg was born and raised in the affluent neighbourhood of Tzahala in Tel Aviv, Israel. Her mother Adrian Walter-Ginzburg is an American Jewish gerontologist who immigrated to Israel. Esther's father Arieh "Arik" Ginzburg is an architect from a family of Ashkenazi Jewish (Polish-Jewish and Belarusian-Jewish) descent. Her paternal grandfather was Grodno-born Israeli architect Shlomo "Grisha" Ginzburg, who was involved in the original planning and construction of Tel Aviv. Her maternal grandmother was a cousin of the late American photojournalist Paul Schutzer. She attended the Ironi Yud Alef High School in northern Tel Aviv.

She was enlisted to the Israel Defense Forces on 22 July 2009 as a soldier. In October of that year, while speaking in support of military enlistment, she caused headlines by criticizing her fellow Israeli model Bar Refaeli for evading military service via a short-lived marriage to a family friend. While serving as an Israeli soldier, Ginzburg said: "Military service is part of the things I personally believe in."

== Career ==
Ginzburg started modeling at the age of eight with a milk advertisement and at the age of 14 signed a contract with modeling agency Elite Models. In 2006, she signed a two-year deal with Israeli firm Fox, and was featured on the February/March 2007 cover of French Elle. She has also modeled in international campaigns for brands like Tommy Hilfiger, Burberry, FCUK, Pull and Bear, and the Israeli-based fashion brand Castro. She was also featured in the 2009, 2010, and 2011 Sports Illustrated Swimsuit Issue.

Ginzburg made her acting debut in the 2010 Joel Schumacher film Twelve, which garnered negative reviews. In 2013, she appeared in the American comedy film, Movie 43, which was panned by critics and won the 2013 Razzie for Worst Picture.

Ginzburg was a co-host on the Israeli reality singing competition show HaKokhav HaBa (Rising Star)'s debut season, but a season later was replaced by Rotem Sela.

== Personal life ==
Ginzburg married Israeli real estate investor Adi Keizman on 8 June 2012. They have two sons.

On 18 December 2013, it was reported that Ginzburg's father was suing her for allegedly failing to pay him money owed for a house he sold her and her husband. She no longer has a relationship with her father after he sued her, and he has not met her son.

On 17 March 2022, the Israeli television program "Exposure" broadcast an episode called "The Indebted Rich," which featured several alleged Israeli victims of Keizman and Ginzburg. The claimants state that they invested their life savings with Keizman, who promised to build them homes, but then never delivered on the transactions. The report contrasted the lavish lifestyle that Ginzburg and Keizman maintain in Los Angeles, in comparison to the situation of the alleged victims, who claim to now live in poverty.

Ginzburg volunteers for the Hayim Association, which works to provide relief and support to children in Israel who are diagnosed with cancer.

== See also ==
- Israeli fashion
