= Paul Schutzer =

American photojournalist (1930–1967)

- Born: July 11, 1930
- Died: June 5, 1967 (aged 36)
- Occupation: Photojournalist

Paul Schutzer (July 11, 1930 – June 5, 1967) was an American photojournalist for Life magazine, famous for his "The Blunt Reality of the War in Vietnam" cover photo. Schutzer was killed on assignment for Life while embedded with Israeli troops on the first day of the Six-Day War.
