= Sylvie Honigman =

Academic and author (born 1965)

- Born: 1965 (age 60–61)

Academic background
- Education: B.A. History, 1986, University of Paris 1 Pantheon-Sorbonne; M.A. Ancient History, 1990, University of Paris 1 Pantheon-Sorbonne; PhD, Ancient History, 1995, University of Paris 1 Pantheon-Sorbonne
- Thesis: Les Orientaux dans l'Égypte grecque et romaine: onomastique, identité culturelle et statut personnel (1995)
- Doctoral advisor: Joseph Mélèze-Modrzejewski

Academic work
- Discipline: Ancient History
- Sub-discipline: Hellenistic period Greek historiography in the Hellenistic period Jews in Ptolemaic and Roman Egypt; Jewish literature in Greek
- Institutions: Tel Aviv University

Sylvie Honigman (Hebrew: סילבי הוניגמן; born 1965) is an academic and author. Her research interests include the Hellenistic period, Greek historiography in the Hellenistic period, Jews in Ptolemaic and Roman Egypt, and Jewish literature in Greek. Since 2003, she has been a senior lecturer at Tel Aviv University. She has authored two books along with many articles.

== Education ==
Honigman obtained all her degrees from the University of Paris 1 Pantheon-Sorbonne: a bachelor's degree in history in 1986, a master's degree in ancient history in 1990, and a doctorate in ancient history in 1995. Her doctoral dissertation, "Les Orientaux dans l'Égypte grecque et romaine: onomastique, identité culturelle et statut personnel" ("Orientals in Ptolemic and Roman Egypt: Onomastics, cultural identity and personal status"), was supervised by Professor Joseph Mélèze-Modrzejewski. She also received a French national degree for teacher training in history and geography in 1989.

== Career ==
While studying for her doctorate, Honigman worked part-time in the department of history at Paris-Est Créteil University from 1991 to 1994. In the 1994-1995 academic year she was a full-time doctoral student in the department of history at the University of Caen Normandy.

After obtaining her PhD, Honigman became a tenured lecturer in ancient history at the University of Caen from 1995 to 1998. She then moved to Israel to accept a similar position at Tel Aviv University from 1998 to 2003. In 2003, she became a senior lecturer at the latter institution.

Honigman's research interests include the Hellenistic period, Greek historiography in the Hellenistic period, Jews in Ptolemaic and Roman Egypt, and Jewish literature in Greek. She is a member of the Maccabees Project at Boston University.

Notably, she has idiosyncratic views downplaying the reliability of the books of Maccabees as a source on the Maccabean Revolt compared to other historians. She has argued that the persecution of traditionalist Jews under Antiochus IV Epiphanes was greatly overstated in the surviving sources, and the conflict was more due to economic factors than religious ones. While other historians have been skeptical about her strongest claims, her work is generally considered a useful addition to the field.

== Works ==
- The Septuagint and Homeric Scholarship in Alexandria: Study in the Narrative of the 'Letter of Aristeas'. Routledge. 2003. ISBN 978-0415280723.
- Tales of High Priests and Taxes: The Books of the Maccabees and the Judean Rebellion against Antiochos IV. University of California Press. 2014. ISBN 9780520958180.
