= Jason L. Honigman =

American lawyer (1904–1990)

Jason Lester Honigman (October 25, 1904 – September 12, 1990) was a Russian-born American lawyer and the Republican nominee for Michigan Attorney General in 1958.

== Biography ==
Honigman was born on October 25, 1904, in Russia. In 1911, he and his mother emigrated to the United States. After arriving in the United States, he was reunited with his father who had emigrated at an earlier time. In 1916, the Honigman family moved to Detroit, Michigan.

In 1926, Honigman graduated from the University of Michigan at the head of his class. During college, he worked for a law firm headed by the Governor of Michigan, Alex Groesbeck. In 1948, with Milton J. Miller, he formed a law firm that is known today as Honigman LLP (commonly “Honigman”), currently located in the First National Building in the heart of downtown Detroit directly facing Campus Martius Park. In 1949, he authored Michigan Court Rules Annotated.

Honigman was a Republican. In 1958, he was the Republican nominee for Michigan Attorney General, losing to Democratic nominee Paul L. Adams of Sault Ste. Marie, Michigan. He served as chairman and chief executive officer of a national supermarket chain, Allied Supermarkets, from 1960 to 1968 and remained chairman until 1975. He was also chairman of the Gold Bell Stamp Company and president of the Michigan Mortgage Corporation.

Honigman died on September 12, 1990, aged 85, in Beverly Hills, Michigan, from heart failure.
