= Honigman LLP =

American law firm

- Headquarters: Detroit, Michigan; United States
- No. of offices: 8
- No. of attorneys: 330+
- Major practice areas: General Practice
- Revenue: ▲$210,400,000 (2018)
- Date founded: 1948; 78 years ago
- Founder: Jason L. Honigman and Milton J. Miller
- Company type: Limited Liability Partnership
- Website: www.honigman.com

Honigman LLP is a law firm founded in Detroit with over 350 attorneys in eight offices. The firm ranked 135th on The American Lawyer's 2019 AmLaw 200 rankings of U.S. law firms.

== History ==
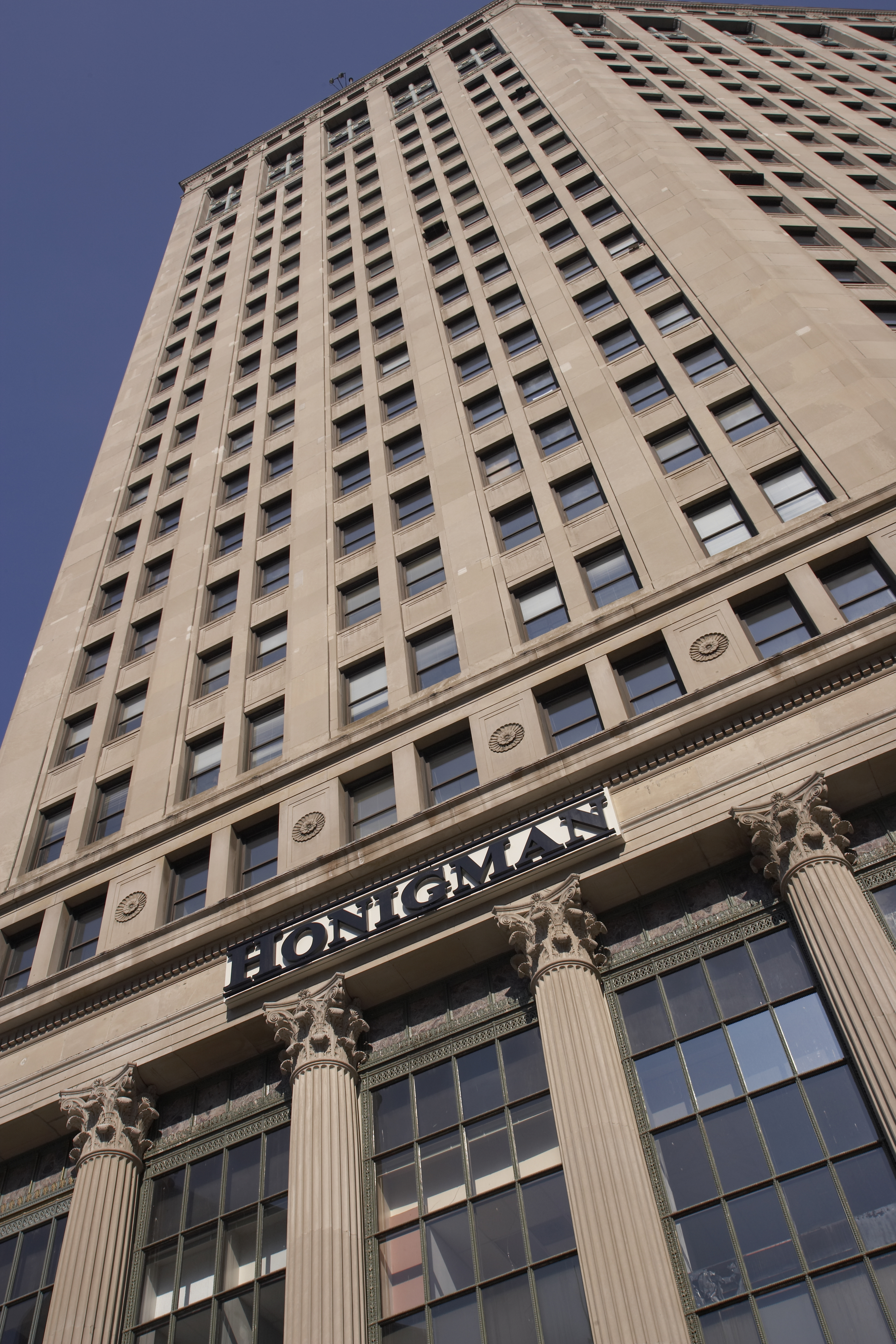
Honigman headquarters in the First National Building.

In 1948, Detroit-based attorneys Jason L. Honigman and Milton J. Miller founded Honigman, which would grow to become one of the largest law firms in Michigan over the next decades. In 2015, Honigman merged with Chicago-based law firm, Schopf & Weiss to establish its first Illinois office. In 2019, Honigman changed its name from "Honigman Miller Schwartz and Cohn LLP" to "Honigman LLP."

== Notable people ==
- Avern Cohn, senior judge of the United States District Court for the Eastern District of Michigan
- Jason L. Honigman, founding partner
- Mark A. Goldsmith, judge of the United States District Court for the Eastern District of Michigan
- Carl Levin, former United States Senator from Michigan
- Milton J. Miller, founding partner
- Raymond Kethledge, judge of the United States Court of Appeals for the Sixth Circuit
- Scott Romney, Republican politician, member of the Romney family
- Richard Zuckerman, former Department of Justice Tax Division Assistant Attorney General
- Mike Duggan, former mayor of Detroit
