= Daul Kim =

South Korean model (1989–2009)

- Daul Kim in 2008
- Born: Kim Da-ul (김다울); 31 May 1989; Seoul, South Korea
- Died: 19 November 2009 (aged 20); Paris, France
- Cause of death: Suicide
- Resting place: Nebosan Christian Memorial Park (Note: News reports state that Kim's remains were interred at Nebosan Christian Memorial Park in Yangpyeong-gun, Gyeonggi-do. The memorial park is located at 36-27 Geumui-gil, Jipyeong-myeon, Yangpyeong-gun, Gyeonggi-do, South Korea, at the site currently identified as Sarang Memorial Park.); 37.4663°N 127.6592°E
- Citizenship: South Korean
- Occupation: Model
- Awards: 2008 Model of the Year; 2009 Fashion Model Award
- Modelling information
- Height: 1.78 m (5 ft 10 in)
- Hair colour: Black
- Eye colour: Brown
- Website: iliketoforkmyself.blogspot.com

Daul Kim (Korean: 김다울; May 31, 1989 – November 19, 2009), also known as Nicole Daul Kim, was a South Korean model, painter and blogger. She died by suicide at the age of 20.

== Early life ==
Kim was born in Seoul, South Korea, on 31 May 1989. She moved abroad at four years old and spent part of her childhood in Malaysia and was educated in Singapore. At age 13, she was discovered by the Singaporean modeling agency Avenue. She left school at 15 and returned to South Korea to pursue modeling. Kim later described herself as an “outsider” because of her nomadic childhood and said that she initially had difficulty readjusting to life in Korea, where she had few Korean friends.

== Career ==
=== 2006–2007 ===
Kim began modeling professionally in South Korea in 2006, appearing in several editorials for Vogue Korea.

In 2006, Kim appeared in the music videos for Park Hye-kyung's "Yesterday" and Nell's "Healing".

She made her international runway debut at the March 2007 Paris Fashion Week where she modelled for Chanel, Dries Van Noten, and Maison Margiela. In May 2007, she appeared in an i-D editorial.

Kim also pursued painting and filmmaking alongside modeling. In 2007, she made and edited the short film 4, in which she played an airplane passenger. She walked in Chanel's haute couture show in Paris in July and appeared on the cover of Vogue Korea in August. On 10 August, she held a solo exhibition of her paintings in Seoul. Later that year, she became one of the faces of Moschino in a campaign photographed by Peter Lindbergh and modeled for the fall catalogs of Neiman Marcus and Nordstrom. During the September fashion shows in Milan and Paris, she walked for Salvatore Ferragamo, Alexander McQueen, and Chanel. She subsequently appeared in editorials for Vogue China and Amica.

In 2007, Kim appeared alongside models Han Hye-jin and Park Yoon-jung in the third season of Mnet's reality series I AM A MODEL, which followed the models during New York Fashion Week.

=== 2008 ===
In 2008, Kim continued to work internationally, walking for designers and fashion houses including Duro Olowu, Dolce & Gabbana, and Louis Vuitton during the February fashion shows in London, Milan, and Paris. She appeared in editorials for i-D and Another Magazine and was featured on the May cover of Vogue Korea alongside other Korean models. She was also featured on the July cover of Harper's Bazaar Korea and was photographed for H&M and Tank. She was also named Model of the Year by the Japanese fashion magazine An An.

During the September New York Fashion Week, Kim documented her experiences for New York magazine. She subsequently walked for Anna Sui, Rodarte, Christopher Kane, Dolce & Gabbana, and Alexander McQueen during the spring 2009 shows in New York, London, Milan, and Paris. She continued to appear in international fashion editorials, including Korean Numéro, V, and Dazed & Confused.

In 2008, Kim co-authored Seoul's Treasure House with fashion editor Jeon Hyo-jin. Published by V-Book on July 25, 2008, the 208-page book explores Seoul's shops, restaurants, cultural spaces, and other locations through the perspectives of its two authors. Kim contributed a series of interviews and reports under the section “Daul Report”, as well as a section titled “Daul's Behind”, which covers her experiences in New York, London, Paris, and Seoul. The book's publication event was scheduled at Daily Projects in Seoul on August 2, 2008. In an announcement reported at the time, Kim promoted the event as “SEOUL BOOK party 08.02 3pm daily projects.”

=== 2009 ===
In January 2009, Kim appeared in a Vogue Korea editorial in which she portrayed Linda Evangelista. During the February fashion season, she opened the Karen Walker show in New York and also walked for Rodarte and VPL. She subsequently walked for Vivienne Westwood, Bottega Veneta, Dolce & Gabbana, Roberto Cavalli, Maison Margiela, and Dries Van Noten in London, Milan, and Paris. She continued to appear in fashion editorials, including Velvet, i-D, Vogue Japan, and British Vogue. She also received the Fashion Model Award at the Asia Model Festival Awards.

In 2009, Kim left Elite Models in New York and signed with Next Model Management.

In June 2009, Kim appeared nude in an editorial for i-D, prompting criticism from some Korean commentators. She responded to the criticism on her blog, defending nudity in fashion and arguing that Korean women were held to different standards.

In July, Kim walked Chanel's haute couture show in Paris and appeared in British Vogue in August. She also appeared in editorials for Zoo and Dansk and was interviewed backstage at the Richard Nicoll show by Test Mag.

Kim also appeared in advertising and video campaigns, including a Topshop television commercial.

In October 2009, she appeared on Olive's Olive Show, which interviewed her during New York Fashion Week about her career and experiences as a model. She also appeared on the cover of the Russh October–November 2009 issue

== Personal life ==
Kim spent much of her childhood in Singapore and other countries, and spoke English, Chinese, and French in addition to Korean. Outside of modelling, Kim also worked in photography, video, painting and illustration, and expressed an ambition to become a film director.

Kim was an avid collector of forks, reportedly owning around 100 of them. She was a fan of Klaus Kinski films, and enjoyed reading work by Milan Kundera. She was also fond of guinea pigs, and in a 2007 blog post, Kim introduced her two guinea pigs, Tiger and Jamong, and wrote affectionately about them. She had a tattoo of a star on the inside of her left hand.

Despite her growing success, Kim said she disliked being recognized in public and preferred to maintain an ordinary life. Kim emphasized that fashion was only one part of her interests, saying, “Fashion is good, but it's not all there is in the world. There's so much more out there.”

=== Blog ===
Kim maintained a personal blog titled I Like to Fork Myself, under the name "Daul Monster". She began the blog in approximately 2007 and used it to document her artwork and aspects of her work, social life, interests, and thoughts. Her writing frequently touched on mental health, loneliness, relationships, human behaviour, identity, and questions about life and existence, alongside observations about fashion, art, literature, music and popular culture. Her blog was noted for its highly personal and unconventional style, combining photographs and everyday observations with poetic and introspective passages.

== Death and impact ==
In 2007, Kim discussed in her blog her mental health as well as her thoughts on suicide. On April 18, 2007, she wrote "im definately [sic] not depressed, and i dont want to killmyself".

On April 30, 2007, Kim wrote "I am going to smash my face... My life as Daul was so miserable and lonely. Please join my loneliness in another world. I love you all. Daul", but later added, "KIDDING. I'm fine. Just tired."

On October 30, 2009, during New York Fashion Week she left a post on her blog describing herself as "mad depressed and overworked".

On November 15, 2009, Kim made a blog entry reflecting on time, memories, and loneliness. It was later reported that friends of Kim stated she was in a fragile emotional state and felt pressure from her career.

On November 18, 2009, Kim published a blog entry titled “Say Hi to Forever,” including a link to the Jim Rivers's song “I Go Deep.” Underneath she wrote "best track forever".

On November 19, 2009, sometime in the early morning Kim communicated with a Korean friend about relationship difficulties; contemporary reporting says the conversation ended abruptly.

At 9:30 a.m. on November 19, Kim's body was discovered hanged in her apartment on Rue Albert-Thomas in Paris's 10th arrondissement. A suicide note was reportedly found at the scene, and French authorities subsequently determined that her death was a suicide.

Her note was reported as stating:

"I relate to nothing. The more I gain, the more lonely it is."

Kim's funeral occurred on December 2, 2009, and her remains were interred at a columbarium in Yangpyeong. Kim's death prompted tributes within the international fashion industry, including Lee Soo-hyuk, G-Dragon, and Han Hye-jin, and mourning among South Korean bloggers. Models.com published a remembrance on the day of her death, while Simon Ungless, director of fashion at the Academy of Art University, described her as “a true creative spirit who was equally an artist and a model.” Contemporary reporting also described the death as prompting discussion about the pressures of high-fashion modeling and the relationship between professional success and personal well-being.

== Works ==
- Kim, Daul; Jeon, Hyo-jin (2008). Seoul's Treasure House. V-Book. p. 208. ISBN 9788993037050.
- Film:
  - 4 (2007) — short film, directed and edited by Daul Kim, who also starred.
- Music videos:
  - Park Hye-kyung – "Yesterday" (2006)[MV] 박혜경 "6집 Yesterday" - Yesterday. YouTube (Music video) (in Korean). Danal Entertainment. 23 March 2006.
  - Nell – "치유" ("Healing") (2006)넬(Nell) - 치유(cure). YouTube (Music video) (in Korean). STONE MUSIC.

== See also ==
- Suicide in South Korea
