= TNT (clothing) =

Israeli urban fashion brand

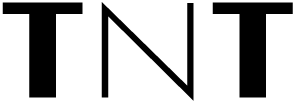
- Company type: subsidiary
- Industry: Fashion
- Founded: Israel (1999)
- Headquarters: Israel
- Area served: Israel; Romania
- Products: clothing
- Parent: Honigman & Sons Ltd.
- Website: www.t-n-t.co.il

TNT is an Israel-based urban fashion label aiming at the teen and young adult market.

== History ==
TNT was established in 1999. The company is owned by Honigman & Sons Ltd. In 2007, it controlled 20 percent of the young adult clothing market in Israel. It opened international branches in Romania in 2007, and Russia in early 2008. The chain has 57 stores across Israel.

In 2022, the label announced that it was shutting down.
