= Honigman (clothing company) =

Israeli fashion company

Honigman & Sons Ltd.
- Type: Private
- Industry: Fashion
- Founded: 1978
- Founder: Yaakov and Micha Honigman
- Defunct: 2018
- Fate: Liquidation; brands sold off separately
- Successor: Avni-Shoham Ofna (Honigman Kids)
- Headquarters: Tel Aviv, Israel
- Number of locations: 150 (2018)
- Area served: Israel
- Products: Clothing, fashion accessories
- Number of employees: 1,000+
- Website: www.honigman.co.il (in Hebrew)

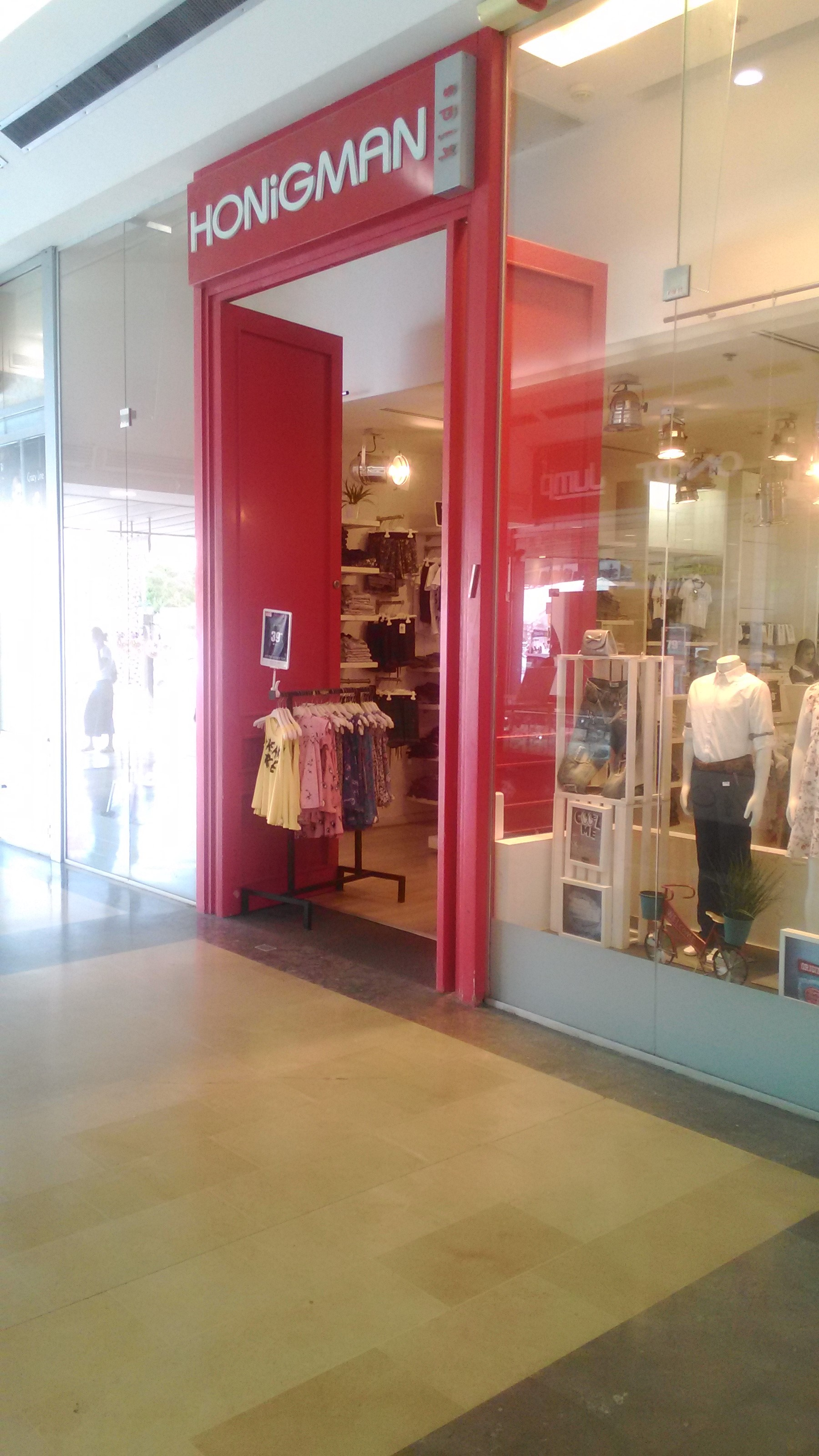
Honigman Kids shop

Honigman (Hebrew: הוניגמן) was an Israeli fashion company specializing in ladies fashion clothing. For children, a separate store Honigman Kids (Hebrew: הוניגמן קידס) operated alongside its sub-brand Virus, sold inside the Honigman Kids stores. Honigman was also the parent company of the teen fashion clothing brand TNT.

Honigman was one of Israel's largest clothing companies, with its three brands – Honigman, Honigman Kids, and TNT – sold in 150 stores across the country. The group traced its origins to a children's clothing store opened in 1947 and was incorporated by the Honigman brothers in 1978. In 2018, it entered liquidation: the flagship women's chain was closed permanently, while the Honigman Kids brand was sold to the operator of the KIWI chain and has continued to trade under separate ownership.

== History ==
The company traces its origins to a small children's clothing store opened in 1947. The brothers Yaakov and Micha Honigman established the chain in 1978.

In March 2011, TNT was in a dispute with Israel's Consumer Protection Unit over a winter campaign starring Brazilian model, Jesus Luz and Irina Denisova. The Unit ordered TNT to remove the ads within seven days, alleging that Denisova appeared underage and that the ads were of a sexual nature. TNT responded: "We reject the claim that the model poses as an underage girl, and we would like to stress that the model was 19 at the time the campaign was shot. To dispel any doubt, the billboard signs and store ads included a caption stating that 'the models are adults.'"

=== Insolvency and breakup (2018) ===
By the late 2010s, Honigman was caught up in a wider crisis in Israeli fashion retail, driven by a consumer shift toward online and overseas shopping. During 2017, the group attempted to offload dozens of stores but was unable to terminate its lease agreements, prompting rumours that it was nearing collapse. Micha Honigman sold real estate in southern Tel Aviv and injected the proceeds into the company.

In February 2018, Honigman filed for court protection from its creditors through a stay of proceedings, declaring debts of NIS 234 million. Of this sum, some NIS 128 million was owed to banks and NIS 13 million to employees; to keep the business afloat the Honigman brothers had also mortgaged their private home in Herzliya Pituah. At the time the group ran about 150 branches under its three brands – Honigman Women, Honigman Kids and TNT – and directly employed more than 1,000 people. About ten days before the filing, owners Yaakov and Micha Honigman had announced that chief executive Kobi Moiseh would be replaced by former CEO Micha Ronen.

Market observers attributed the collapse not only to the move to online purchasing but also to the chain having become, in their view, an outdated and uncompetitive shopping experience, while Yaakov Honigman pointed to what he called tax discrimination favouring online shoppers, who paid no VAT on overseas parcels valued under US$75.

In March 2018, after roughly five weeks under the stay, the company's trustees – lawyers Keren Reichbach-Segal and Pini Yaniv together with accountant Boaz Gazit – asked the Tel Aviv District Court to approve the sale of 56 stores (about half the chain, including all Honigman Kids outlets), along with the children's-wear inventory, to Avni-Shoham Ofna, owner of the children's clothing chain KIWI, for NIS 8 million.

Under the reported terms, around 700 employees faced dismissal, suppliers, fabric manufacturers and sewing workshops were expected to recover little or nothing, and about half of the bank debt was to be written off as the brothers moved toward personal bankruptcy. Nine of the branches included in the KIWI offer were TNT youth-fashion stores.

=== Aftermath ===
In April 2018 the Tel Aviv District Court approved a revised arrangement under which only 38 of the stores, rather than the 56 initially proposed, were sold to Avni-Shoham Ofna for NIS 6.25 million, with presiding judge Hagai Brenner noting that few bidders had come forward.

As part of the same ruling, the court extended the stay of proceedings to the end of April and approved the sale of a Tel Aviv building privately owned by the Honigman brothers for about NIS 20.3 million. The trustees were also instructed to investigate an apparent inflation of the company's inventory, which had been presented as worth some NIS 120 million but was reassessed at between NIS 38.5 million and NIS 43 million.

The breakup effectively dissolved the Honigman group. The historic Honigman women's chain, for which no buyer could be found, was wound down and closed permanently, while the company's brands were sold off separately.

The Honigman Kids brand survived under new ownership. It was acquired out of receivership by Avni-Shoham Ofna, owner of the children's clothing chain KIWI, controlled by businessman Bezalel Ben Shalom, for about NIS 6.5 million. Ben Shalom returned the brand to profitability, and by 2022 Honigman Kids operated around 50 stores; the parent company ran about 168 outlets across the KIWI and Honigman Kids brands and reported revenue of NIS 185 million in the first nine months of that year.

The teen brand TNT was sold separately to a franchisee, who tried to turn it around by closing loss-making outlets and exiting leading malls. Less than a year after the purchase, however, TNT again entered a stay of proceedings over debts of tens of millions of shekels.

== Models ==
- Sendi Bar
- George Barnett
- Jesus Luz
- Melanie Peres
- Shiraz Tal
- Ayelet Zurer

== See also ==
- Israeli fashion
