= List of Israeli films of 1976 =

A list of films produced by the Israeli film industry in 1976.

== 1976 releases ==
Premiere	Title	Director	Cast	Genre	Notes	Ref
?	Givat Halfon Eina Ona (Hebrew: גבעת חלפון אינה עונה, lit. "Halfon Hill Doesn't Answer")	Assi Dayan	Shaike Levi, Yisrael Poliakov, Gavri Banai	Comedy		
?	Michael Sheli (Hebrew: מיכאל שלי, lit. "My Michael")	Dan Wolman	Oded Kotler and Efrat Lavi	Drama	An Israeli-American co-production	
?	Mishpahat Tzan'ani (Hebrew: משפחת צנעני, lit. "Tzanani Family")	Boaz Davidson	Gabi Amrani, Joseph Shiloach	Drama		
?	Kuni Leml in Tel Aviv (Hebrew: קוני למל בתל אביב)	Joel Silberg	Mike Burstyn	Comedy, Musical		
?	Eizeh Yofi Shel Tzarot! (Hebrew: איזה יופי של צרות!, lit. "Beautiful Troubles")	Assi Dayan	Ze'ev Revach, Yona Elian	Comedy, Romance		
?	Rak Hayom (Hebrew: רק היום, lit. "Only Today")	Ze'ev Revach	Ze'ev Revach	Comedy		
?	Lupo B'New York (Hebrew: לופו בניו-יורק, lit. "Lupo Goes to New York")	Boaz Davidson	Yehuda Barkan, Gabi Amrani	Comedy, Drama, Family		

== See also ==
- 1976 in Israel
