= Shaike Levi =

Israeli comedian, singer and actor (born 1939)

- שייקה לוי
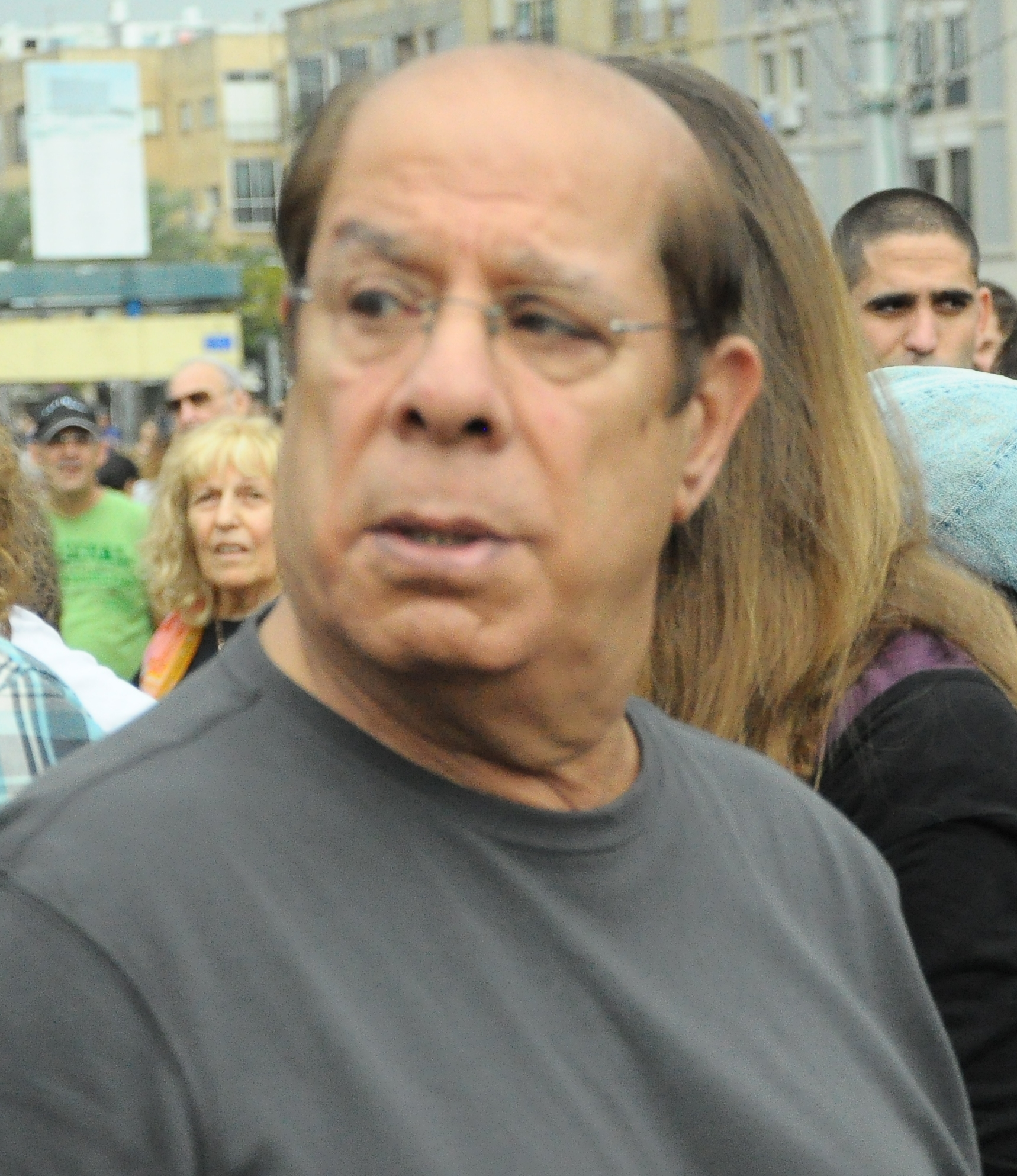
- Levi attending the funeral service of Arik Einstein in 2013
- Born: Yeshayahu Levi; 13 December 1939 (age 86); Cairo, Egypt
- Other name: Shaike Levy
- Occupations: Actor; comedian; singer
- Years active: 1961-2009
- Awards: Israel Prize (2000)

Yeshayahu (Shaike) Levi (Hebrew: שייקה לוי; born 13 December 1939) is an Israeli comedian, singer and actor. He is best known for being part of the HaGashash HaHiver comedy trio, which won the Israel Prize in 2000.

== Biography ==
Yeshayahu (Shaike) Levy was born in Cairo, Egypt to Mazal and Moshe Levy. He left Egypt with his mother in 1944, after the death of his father. The family settled in Tel Aviv but Levi spent his adolescent years in Kibbutz Ein Hayam and later Givat Brenner. In 1956-1957 he led the singing group the "Givat Brenner Foursome" alongside Daniel Vardon.

== Entertainment career ==
During his military service, Levy served in the IDF band at the Gadna and then in Lehakat Pikud Merkaz. Shortly after his discharge in 1960, he joined the band "The Small Hours Club" in Safed. Levi was accepted to the Cameri Theater and played a small role in a play called "The Twelfth Night" but when Naomi Polani formed the musical group HaTarnegolim (Hebrew: התרנגולים lit. The Roosters), Levi preferred it over the Cameri. Levy says that he hadn't studied acting or voice coaching and that Naomi Polani was like a school to the group.

In 1962 Levy acted in his first movie role as an 'enemy pilot' in the film Sinaia (Hebrew: סיניה), which was based on an actual event from the Suez Crisis where a Bedouin baby was brought to Israel by an army medic after her mother had been accidentally injured by Israeli forces during the fighting. Following military service in entertainment units, Levi joined HaTarnegolim and afterwards joined the HaGashash HaHiver trio in late 1963. The team staged ll comedy acts and participated in ll films along with numerous festivals, musical recordings, and television performances during a time span of 40 years.

From 1993 to 1999 Levy headed Israeli Artists' Association and in 1996 he came out with a biographical book titled Sipurim Im Rotev (Hebrew: סיפורים עם רוטב lit. 'Stories With Sauce'), which included songs and cooking recipes. In 1999 he released his first solo album, "Shaike Levi."

Between 2003-2006 Levy portrayed Elvis Ben-David in Israeli productions based on the adaptation of the Mexican telenovela El Amor no es como lo pintan ("Love is Not as They Paint It") and also appeared in a solo stage act (Yeshayahu Chapter 2) and participated in a children's musical tape (Bamboni Ein Kamoni).

=== HaGashash HaHiver ===
In late 1963 Levy left The Roosters – together with two other "Roosters", Gavri Banai and Yisrael Poliakov – at the request of Avraham Deshe (Pashanel), in order to start the Gashash HaHiver trio. Levi recollects the success of the Gesher HaYarkon trio and that, while they were not certain that they could duplicate the success of HaTarnegolim, Pashanel was sure and paid their salaries throughout the long preparation months.

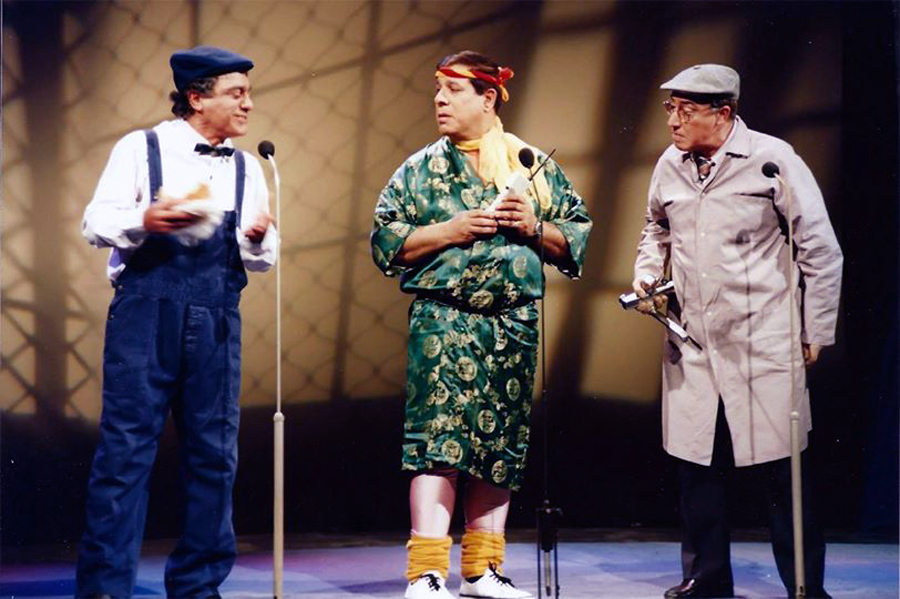
HaGashash HaHiver - right to left: Yisrael Poliakov, Shaike Levi and Gavri Banai

Their first act, titled Simhat Zkenti (Hebrew: שמחת זקנתי, slang for "[makes] my old lady happy") was more successful than anticipated with 350 performances across Israel by the end of 1965. The show, which was very Mizrahit in nature, had an initial unresponsive welcome by the kibbutz movement. Levi recalls Shaike Ophir being strict on the group emphasizing every 'Heth' ('Hebrew: ח') and 'Ayin' ('Hebrew: ע') like he would and attributes their acceptance by the kibbutzim to their director Nisim Aloni.

In 1964 Levy performed in Ephraim Kishon's critically acclaimed film Sallah Shabati (Hebrew: סלאח שבתי) alongside Chaim Topol, Gila Almagor, Zaharira Harifai, and Arik Einstein. The film was a satirical portrayal of the poor conditions and the integration of the Jewish refugees from Arab lands living in the maabara. In 1967, Levi also played in another Kishon film – Ervinka (Hebrew: ארבינקא, about an incorrigible layabout who becomes involved in the robbery of the Israeli lottery under cover of making a documentary.

=== Late 1960s ===
Between 1966–1970, Levy made four films under Uri Zohar together with Gavri Banai and Yisrael Poliakov: Moishe Ventilator (1966) (Hebrew: מוישה וונטילטור, also 'Moishe Air-Condition'), a parody featuring Yaakov Bodo, Shaike Ophir, and Uri Zohar about a frugal private whose money-saving ideas include cutting maps in the operation room; HaShehuna Shelanu (1968) (Hebrew: השכונה שלנו, lit. 'Our Neighborhood', also 'Fish, Football, and Girls'), a bourekas film with Shaike Ophir, Gabi Amrani, Yona Atari, Tsippi Shavit, and Gadi Yagil among others; Kol Mamzer Melekh (1968) (Hebrew: כל ממזר מלך, lit. 'Every Bastard is King') with Yehoram Gaon as a chatty driver who gets entangled in the Six Day War and ends up stopping an Egyptian armored division by himself; and Hitromamut (1970) (Hebrew: התרוממות, also 'Takeoff'), which depicted three married men who fulfil a sexual fantasy but quickly turn to envious and guilty feelings. Hitromamut, which included Josie Katz and Liora Rivlin was noted for break-through methods in low-budget production and for being filmed in 16 mm and then enlarged to 35 mm. During this time the "Gashash" also participated in Menahem Golan's melodrama film Fortuna (1966) (Hebrew: פורטונה, also 'The Girl from the Dead Sea'), which starred French actor Pierre Brasseur and also in Rafi Nusbaum's film HaMatara Tiran (1968) (Hebrew: המטרה טיראן, lit 'Objective Tiran') about a group of soldiers whose mission is to destroy a Soviet radar station in the Straits of Tiran.

=== Film career ===
Between 1976–1986 the Gashash HaHiver performed in three Assi Dayan films: the a cult movie Givat Halfon Eina Ona (1976) (Hebrew: גבעת חלפון אינה עונה, lit. 'Halfon Hill Doesn't Answer'), a satire about an army reserves company observing the Egyptian border in Sinai; Shlager (1979) (Hebrew: שלאגר, also 'The Hit'), a musical comedy which featured The Frekha Song (written by Assi Dayan, composed by Tzvika Pik and sung by Ofra Haza); HaKrav Al HaVaad (1986) (Hebrew: הקרב על הוועד, also 'Battle of the Chairmanship' or 'House Committee Rivalry'), a humorous depiction of Israeli politics taking place in a condominium. During these years, Levi performed in two other films: Hamesh Meot Ellef Shachor (1977) (Hebrew: חמש מאות אלף שחור, lit. 'Five Hundred Thousand Black'), starring Ze'ev Revach, Jacques Cohen, and Yosef Shiloah and directed by Shaike Ophir; and in Kohav Hashahar (1980) (Hebrew: כוכב השחר, also 'Morning Star'), a film about life in Yafo featuring Arieh Elias, Noam Kaniel, Asher Tzarfati, Yosef Shiloah, and Arab-Israeli soccer player Rifat Turk.

=== Television ===
In 2003, Levy was cast as 'Elvis Ben-David' in the television series Esti Ha'mechoeret (Hebrew: אסתי המכוערת, lit. Ugly Esti), an Israeli adaptation of the Mexican telenovela El Amor no es como lo pintan ("Love is not as they paint it"). His successful and charismatic appearance promoted further productions that were based on his Elvis character: Elvis, Rosental, VeHaIsha Hamistorit (2005) (Hebrew: אלביס, רוזנטל, והאשה המסתורית, lit. Elvis, Rosenthal, and the Mystery Woman) and Elvis (2006). During this period Levi came out with a solo stage act titled Yeshayahu Chapter 2 (in 2005).

In 2007, Levy participated in a children's musical tape – Bamboni Ein Kamoni (Hebrew: במבוני אין כמוני). In an interview for Maariv's internet site nrg he jokingly noted that this performance to a very young crowd is a long term investment and that in 20 years they would be the people who would purchase tickets to his shows.

Shaike Levy and fellow "Gashash" Gavri Banai were enlisted for the second season of the television show Hakol Dvash (Hebrew: הכל דבש, lit. "Everything is Honey"). The show, which included the third "Gashash", Yisrael Poliakov, has gained critical acclaim for its first season but also saw the death of both Poliakov and Shosh Atari, who portrayed the parents of the show's creator-writer, Yael Polyakov, the real-life daughter of Yisrael.

== Awards and recognition ==
In 2000, Levi was co-awarded the Israel Prize for lifetime achievement and contribution to society and the State of Israel along his with his HaGashash HaHiver colleagues, Gavri Banai and Yisrael Poliakov.

In 2020 he was awarded the Tel Aviv-Yafo Municipality award, together with Gavri Banai. The award reason states that the popular entertainment trio "influenced Israeli culture, the Hebrew language and society in all its aspects".

From the thousands of "Gashash" shows, Levi recalls one at Carnegie Hall that received warm reviews in the New York Times as well as a certain performance in front of injured soldiers in hospitals where a soldier's mother noted, "Don't laugh. Your sutures will open!" to her son who hadn't smiled or laughed in a while.

== Legal issues ==
Levi has been in conflict with the Israel Broadcasting Authority over high per-minute payment demands by Israel's public Channel 1 for airing HaGashash HaHiver early recordings. Levi notes that in those days it was the only channel and they would perform there for free on the condition that it was a single-use recording. Noting a document ratifying his statement to Moshe Gavish (chair of the authority) – signed by various relevant television managers Arnon Zucherman, Moti Kirschenbaum, Rafi Ginat, and others – Levi demanded that the content be transferred to the "Gashash" members and producer as it was their intellectual property.

== Filmography ==
- Sinaia (1962) (Hebrew: סיניה) - as Enemy Pilot
- Sallah Shabati (1964) (Hebrew: סאלח שבתי) - as Shimon Shabati
- Moishe Ventilator (1966) (Hebrew: מוישה ונטילטור)
- Fortuna (1966) (Hebrew: פורטונה)
- Ervinka (1967) (Hebrew: ארבינקא) - as Friedrich
- HaShehuna Shelanu (1968) (Hebrew: השכונה שלנו)
- HaMatara Tiran (1968) (Hebrew: המטרה טיראן)
- Kol Mamzer Melekh (1968) (Hebrew: כל ממזר מלך)
- Hitromamut (1970) (Hebrew: התרוממות)
- Givat Halfon Eina Ona (1976) (Hebrew: גבעת חלפון אינה עונה) - as Mr. Hasson
- Hamesh Meot Ellef Shachor (1977) (Hebrew: חמש מאות אלף שחור)
- Shlager** (1979) (Hebrew: שלאגר)
- Kohav Hashahar (1980) (Hebrew: כוכב השחר)
- HaKrav Al HaVa'ad (1986) (Hebrew: הקרב על הוועד)
- Esti Ha'mechoeret** (TV series, 2003) (Hebrew: אסתי המכוערת) - as Elvis Ben-David
- Elvis, Rosental, VeHaIsha Hamistorit** (TV series, 2005) (Hebrew: אלביס, רוזנטל, והאשה המסתורית) - as Elvis Ben David
- Elvis** (TV series, 2006) (Hebrew: אלביס) - as Elvis Ben David

** also a performer on the soundtrack.

=== Notable stage acts ===
- HaTarnegolim (1960–1963)
- HaGashash HaHiver (1963–2000)
- Yeshayahu Chapter 2 (2005)

==== HaGashash HaHiver shows ====
- "Simhat Zkenti" (Nov. 1964) (Hebrew: שמחת זקנתי) Directed by Shaike Ophir
- "Plan Dalet" (April 1966) (Hebrew: תוכנית ד) Directed by Shaike Ophir
- "Sinema Gashash" (June 1967) (Hebrew: סינימה גשש) Directed by Nisim Aloni
- "Quintette for Shuwarma" (July 1969) (Hebrew: קנטטה לשווארמה) Directed by Nisim Aloni
- "Cassius Clay vs. Khalphon" (1971) (Hebrew: קסיוס קליי נגד חלפון) Directed by Yossi Banai
- "Offside Story" (1974) (Hebrew: אופסייד סטורי) Directed by Yossi Banai
- "Ovdim Aleinu Avoda Ivrit" (1977) (Hebrew: עובדים עלינו עבודה עברית) Directed by Yossi Banai
- "Kreker vs. Kreker" (1980) (Hebrew: קרקר נגד קרקר) Directed by Yossi Banai
- "Beavur Khoken Dollarim" (1985) (Hebrew: בעבור חוקן דולרים) Directed by Moti Kirschenbaum (written by Danni Reve)
- "Koson Ruakh" (1991) (Hebrew: כוסות רוח) Directed by Yossi Banai
- "Gashash and goodbye" (2000) (Hebrew: גשש ולהתראות)

References.

=== Discography ===
- Shaike Levi (solo album - 1999)
- Soundtracks and collections by the Gashash Hahiver

=== Author ===
- 'Sipurim Im Rotev' (Hebrew: סיפורים עם רוטב lit. 'Stories With Sauce') (1996)

== Personal life ==
Levi is married to Orna and they live in Tel Aviv.

== See also ==
- List of Israel Prize recipients
