= Lehakat Pikud Merkaz =

Israeli military entertainment band

Central Command Band להקת פיקוד המרכז
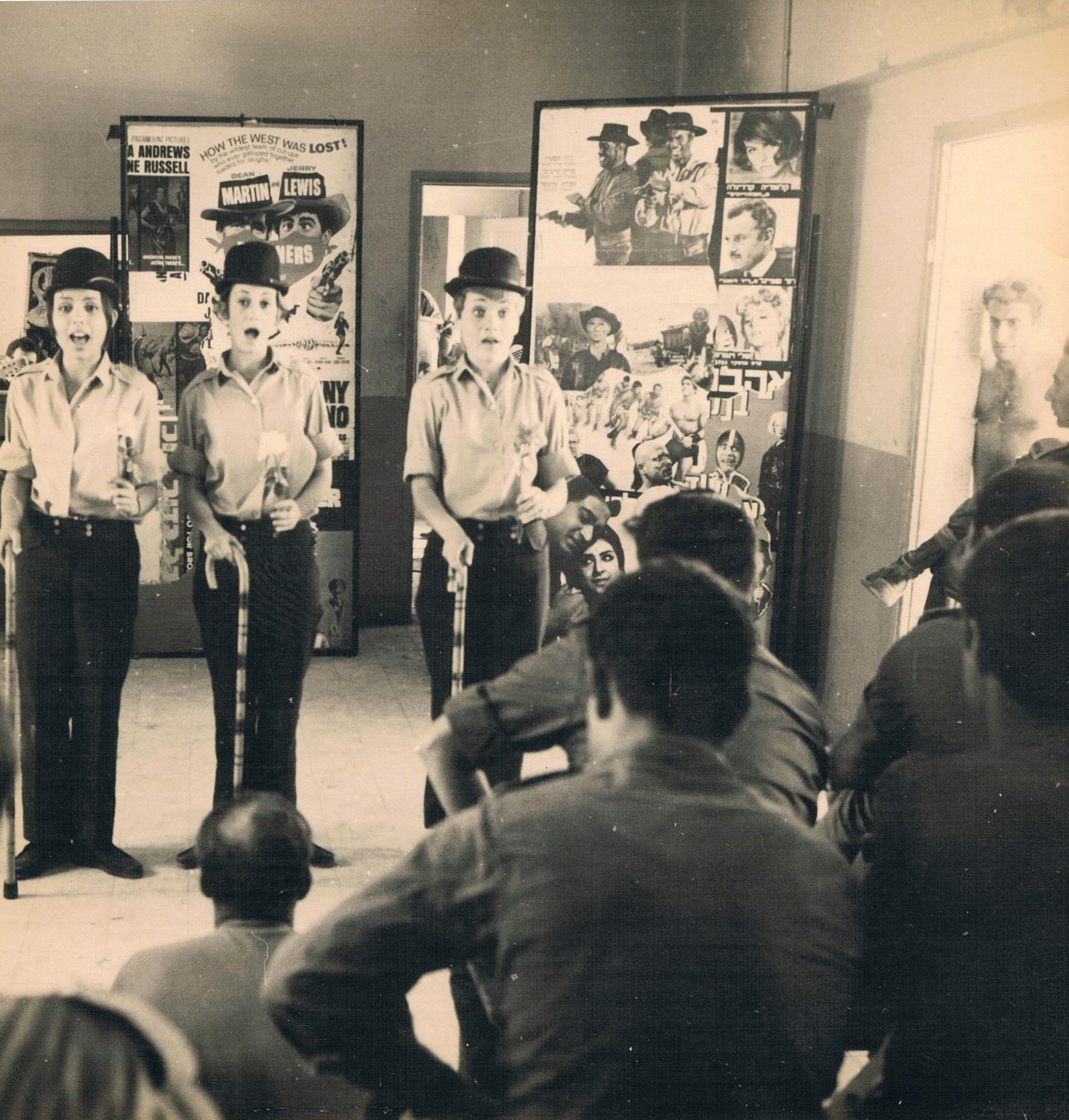
- The Central Command Band in 1969, performing their song "Charlie Chaplin"

Background information
- Origin: Central District, Israel.
- Genres: Israeli folk, Israeli rock
- Years active: 1953-1968, 1969-1975/1978, 1985-1989, 1990-present
- Labels: Hed Arzi Music, NMC, Parlophone

Lehakat Pikud Merkaz, also known as Lehakat Pikud HaMerkaz (Hebrew: להקת פיקוד המרכז, lit. 'Central Command Band'), is the military musical ensemble of the Central Command of the Israel Defense Forces.

The band was initially established in 1953 after the then Central Command Commander, Tzvi Ayalon, requested that a band be formed for his command. While the troupe enjoyed success throughout its existence, it was particularly successful during the late 1960s and early 1970s, following the Six-Day War.

The troupe went through several incarnations, having been disbanded multiple times throughout its history, mostly for behavioural issues. Its repertoire includes songs that have remained part of Israeli culture, and former members of the ensemble have gone on to careers in music, entertainment, acting, and songwriting.

== History ==
=== 1953-1967: Foundation and early success ===
Until 1953, the regional commands of the Israel Defense Forces had small musical groups. That year, the Central Command Commander, Tzvi Ayalon, requested the establishment of a band for his command. Yitzhak Yitzhaky was assigned to form the ensemble, and its first director was Gideon Shemer, then the husband of Naomi Shemer.

The troupe's first program, One of Us, received limited attention outside the Central Command and was not widely documented. On August 30, 1954, the ensemble premiered its second program, One Monkey’s Paw, a theatrical production centered on an IDF chess championship. This program included the first performance of the song Sycamore Garden, written by Yitzhaky and composed by Yohanan Zarai. The song was not recorded by the band at the time, nor was the program released as an album; it was later recorded by Rika Zaraï, Zarai's then-wife.

The band's subsequent programs, Transitional Program and Three Heroes, were also not recorded. The fifth program, A Raid on the Village, marked the first appearance of Shaike Levi, who later became a member of HaTarnegolim and HaGashash HaHiver. This program was directed by Naomi Shemer and Gideon Shemer and received favorable coverage in the Israeli press.

In the late 1950s, the band released its first album, Listen, Buddy!, which consisted of songs from earlier programs. During the same period, the ensemble presented additional programs, including Laughter in the Merkaz, The Right Man at the Right Place, and The Aluf on the Roof. These productions received varying levels of attention, with The Right Man at the Right Place attracting positive press responses, while The Aluf on the Roof received mixed coverage. None of these programs were released as full albums, though the song Heatwaves in the Post from The Right Man at the Right Place was later released as a successful single.

The troupe entered the 1960s with its ninth program, It Is What It Is, which, like the preceding program, received mixed to generally favorable coverage in the contemporary press. Criticism focused primarily on the program's perceived rushed-ness. As with several earlier productions, it was not released as an album.

The band's tenth program, The Lion’s Speaking Authority, formed one side of a split album released in 1961 in collaboration with Lehakat Pikud Tzafon and issued by Hed Arzi Music. The program introduced several changes in stage presentation. In 1962, the band premiered its eleventh program, Soldiers on the Way. Although the title was later used for an EP by the ensemble, the recording did not include material from that program and instead consisted of songs from the subsequent production, Why? Just Because!. An additional EP featuring songs from that program was released under the title Fatherland Twist. These productions included performers such as Oshik Levi and Hedva Amrani.

In October 1963, several members of the band recorded the HaTarnegolim song The Neighborhood Song under the pseudonym "The Neighborhood Band". The performers were soon identified as members of the Central Command Band and were subsequently disciplined.

The band's thirteenth program, No Favors, was the first of its productions to be released as a full album by Hed Arzi Music. The program included a musical setting of Rachel Bluwstein's poem Kinneret, composed by Naomi Shemer. References within the program to contemporary popular styles, including the twist, prompted a formal complaint, though the critical reception of the program was generally positive.

The following program, The Important Thing Is to Remain Healthy, partially reused sketches previously performed by Batzal Yarok and was not released on vinyl. Its successor, At the Center of Things, received limited public attention but was issued as an EP.

In November 1966, the troupe was filmed by a West German television crew under circumstances that remain unclear. The filming led to public controversy, including calls for a boycott of military ensembles and questions regarding the authorization of the production. A statement supporting the boycott was signed by several Israeli composers and songwriters, including Yoram Taharlev, Naomi Shemer, Haim Hefer, and Sasha Argov.

=== 1967-1978: Peak of popularity and decline ===
The Central Command Band played a role in the cultural representation of the Six-Day War in Israeli society. The band's sixteenth program, and fourth album, Where's the Center?, included the song Ammunition Hill, written by Yoram Taharlev. The song became widely known and was associated with the public memory of the Battle of Ammunition Hill. The program was musically directed by Yair Rosenblum and received much acclaim and fanfare amongst the Israeli press and public. Additional songs from the program included The IDF Spokesperson Has Announced by Avi Koren and Arise and Go to Nineveh, also by Taharlev, the latter drawing on the Book of Jonah.

Following the program's release, some members of the troupe avoided participating in scheduled performances in northern Israel and the Sinai Peninsula. As a result, the band was temporarily disbanded by Central Command commander Rehavam Ze'evi, marking the first dissolution of the ensemble. The band was reestablished the following summer.

The subsequent program, Join Us in the Valley, equalled the success of their previous program and was released as an album by Parlophone/EMI. Songs from the program included We Are Both from the Same Village by Naomi Shemer, A Paratrooper's Song by Yoram Taharlev, and Charlie Chaplin, also by Taharlev. The program led to the band being named Band of the Year by Israeli Army Radio, an honor shared that year with Lehakat HaNahal, which received the same designation from Kol Yisrael.

The next program, Near the Jordan (1970), introduced Shlomit Aharon as a featured performer. She sang I Have A Lover In The Special Forces, written by Haim Hefer, which was a major hit that year. The song referred to the then-confidential Haruv commando unit. The program received acclaim comparable to that of the band's preceding productions.

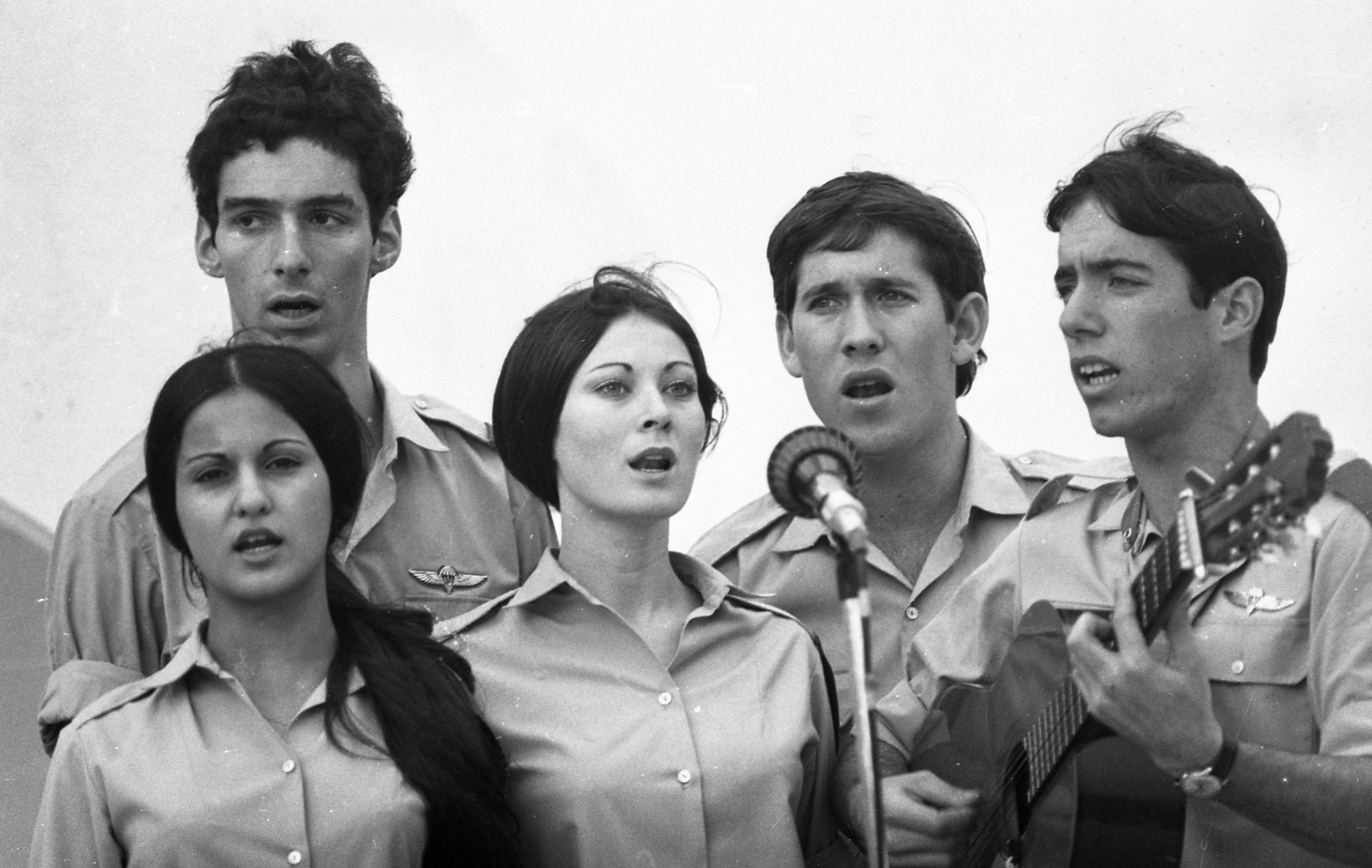
The troupe in 1972, at a ceremony for a memorial site for casualties of battles in the Jordan Valley. At the center of the photo is Uzi Hitman and future President of the Supreme Court of Israel Esther Hayut.

The band's nineteenth program, Last Songs to Last (1972), consisted of a combination of previously performed material from other Central Command entertainment groups and new songs written specifically for the production. The program marked the debut of Uzi Hitman as a performer. Songs from the program included The Man From The Valley, written by Haim Hefer. Among the members of the ensemble at this time was Esther Hayut, who did not continue in the music field after her military service and served as President of the Supreme Court of Israel from 2017 to 2023.

The subsequent program, And That’s Only the Beginning (1975), was the final production of the band in its original format. The ensemble was thereafter reduced to a smaller entertainment unit, which continued operating until 1978. This later iteration produced a single program, Songs of Jerusalem, which included the song Guardian of the Walls, written by Dan Almagor. In 1978, the Central Command Band was disbanded as part of a broader dissolution of military ensembles ordered by Rafael Eitan.

=== 1984-1989: Second reformation and drug scandal ===
Between September 1984 and January 1985, the Central Command Band was reestablished. Its first program and accompanying album, At the Gates of Jericho, achieved commercial success. During this period, the ensemble performed at the Knesset and at a concert marking the fifth anniversary of the LIBI fund. Songs from the album included Ya Lil by Kobi Luria, Set Your Eyes To The East by Yoram Taharlev, and Tomorrow, He Will Return by Danny Robas. David D'Or began his professional music career as part of this program. The album was released by CBS Israel.

The subsequent program and album, The Children of '67, began recording in December 1986. This production received more limited attention than its predecessor. Its most notable song was Play the Accordion, written by Yoram Taharlev and recorded in collaboration with Yehoram Gaon.

In the spring of 1989, a report alleged that several members of the band had smoked hashish. Following an investigation, the individuals involved were arrested, causing moral outrage amongst the IDF's chain of command. Some of those arrested were later reported to have used additional psychoactive drugs. In the aftermath of the incident, the band's future and the future of all the military ensembles were uncertain. The Central Command Band was subsequently disbanded for the third time under the orders of the Education and Youth Corps. Six of the members not implicated in the scandal were reassigned to smaller performance units on a temporary basis.

=== 1990-present: Third reformation ===
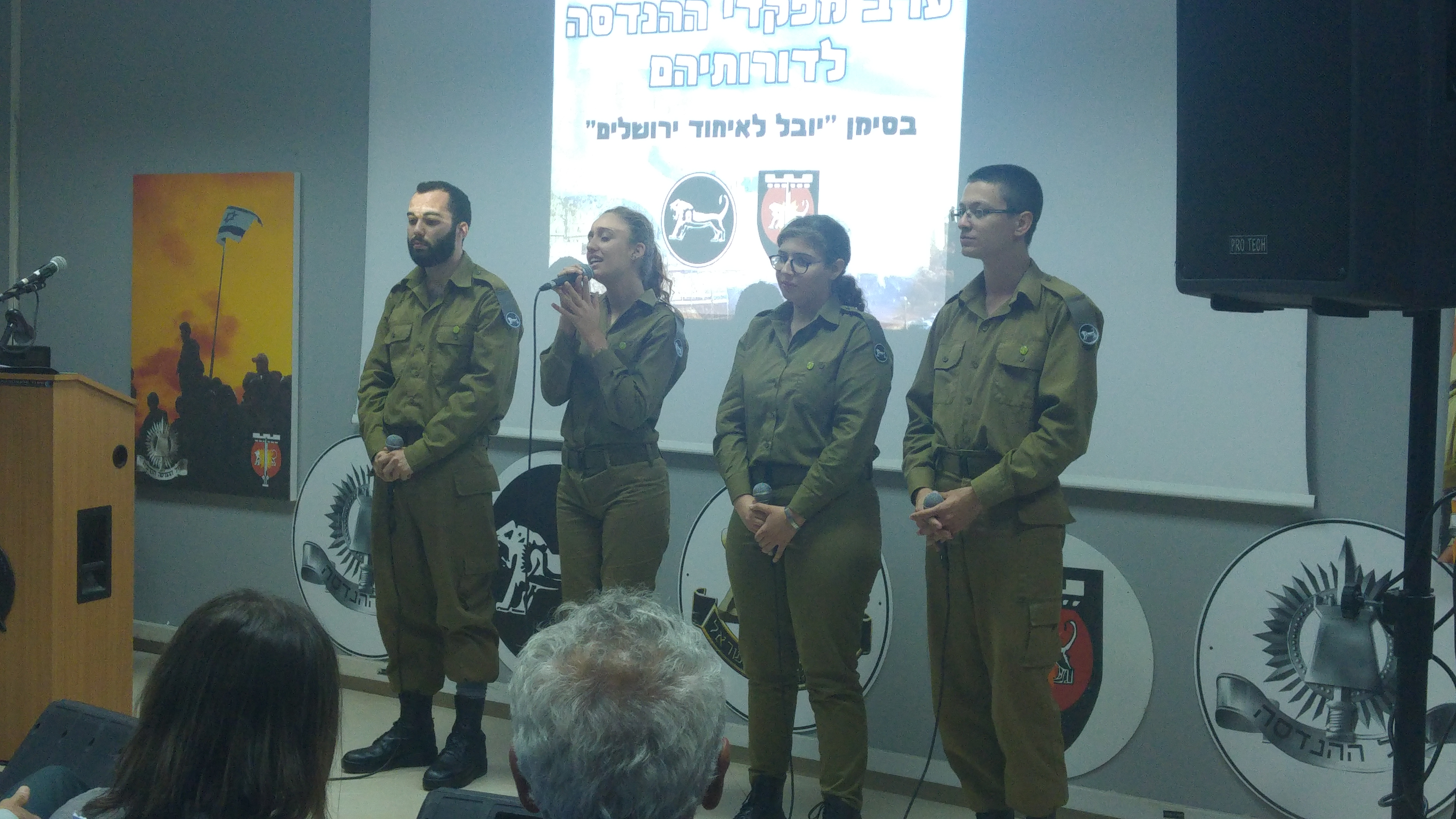
The modern incarnation of the band performing in 2017.

In November 1990, the Central Command Band was reestablished, amid uncertainty regarding the longevity of this iteration following the circumstances surrounding its previous disbandment.

In 1992, the band was temporarily disbanded again after a few of its members intentionally refused to perform at a concert. As a result, the members who were responsible were sent to detention.

In parallel with other Israel Defense Forces military ensembles, the band's prominence in mainstream popular culture has declined. Its cultural presence has continued primarily through its recorded repertoire. The song We Are Both from the Same Village has remained in regular rotation on Israeli media during Yom HaZikaron.

== Notable members ==
- David D'Or
- Esther Hayut
- Galit Giat
- Gil Dor
- Galia Yishai
- Hedva Amrani
- Nitza Saul
- Oded Kotler
- Oshik Levi
- Shaike Levi
- Shem Tov Levi
- Shlomit Aharon
- Shlomo Bar-Aba
- Uzi Hitman

== Discography ==
- Listen, Buddy! (1957)
- The Lion's Speaking Authority (1961, with the Northern Command Band)
- Soldiers on the Way (1963)
- Fatherland Twist (1963)
- No Favors (1964)
- Center of Attention (1966)
- Where's the Merkaz? (1968)
- Join Us In The Valley (1969)
- Near the Jordan (1970)
- Last Songs To Last (1972)
- And That's Only The Beginning (1975)
- At the gates of Jericho (1985)
- The Children of '67 (1987)

== See also ==
- Music of Israel
- Culture of Israel
- Israeli military ensembles
