= Jezreel Valley Contemporary Dance Festival =

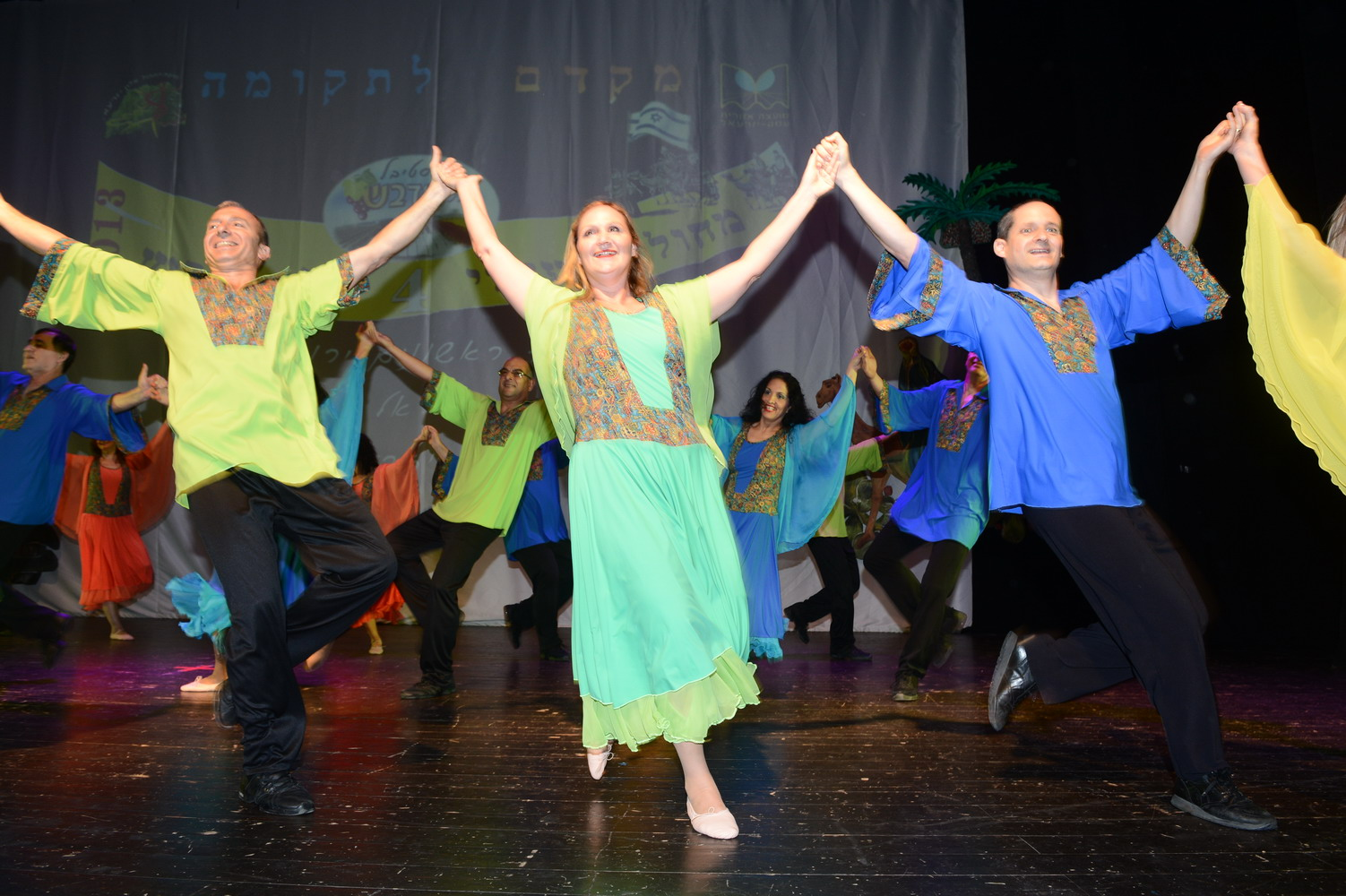
Alon Jezreel Contemporary Dance Company performing in 2012

Jezreel Valley Contemporary Dance Festival (Hebrew: פסטיבל מחול יזרעאלי) is an annual contemporary dance festival that takes place during the Jewish holiday of Shavuot, as part of the Milk & Honey Festival in the Jezreel Valley, Israel.

== History ==
The festival was established in 2010 by the Alon Jezreel contemporary dance association and choreographer Ze'ev Keren in 2010. It hosts contemporary dance companies from all over Israel and has become an annual event.

The first festival commemorated 100 years of Israeli settlement in the Jezreel Valley. Choreographers Shlomo Haziz, Dganit Rom, and Ze'ev Keren put together the dance "Standing Guard", performed by Hora Rishonim Jerusalem, Misgav Contemporary Dance Company, and Alon Jezreel Contemporary Dance Company.

Participating dance companies stay in Nahalal during the two days of the festival.

The festival in 2011 – "Chicken on the Yarkon Bridge", was dedicated to the 1960s Israeli band "The Roosters" and trio "Gesher HaYarkon" in commemoration of 50 years to their contribution to Israeli culture. The guest of honor at the festival was The Roosters' founder Naomi Polani.

The festival in 2012 – "Land of the Tsabar", was held at the Amphitheater in Nahalal, and hosted Serbian contemporary dance company "Kod Tent", sponsored by Serbian Ambassador to Israel, who performed in traditional clothing accompanied by an orchestra playing Serbian folk music.

The festival in 2013 "Coefficient of restitution" – was held at the event hall of Kibbutz Yifat. 15 different contemporary dance companies partook and performed dances with the theme of the Jewish people from their formation until their restitution to the land of Israel. At the finale of the festival, which was held at the sports hall in Nahalal, the festival hosted a contemporary dance company from the Gaza envelope, with the artistic directing of Gavri Levi.

== See also ==
- Dance in Israel
- Culture of Israel
