= Lehakat HaNahal =

Israeli military entertainment band

The Nahal Band להקת הנח"ל
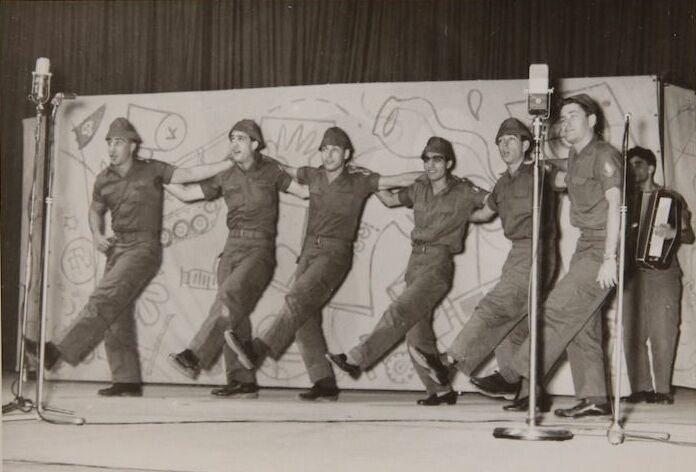
- Lehakat HaNahal performing on stage in the late 1950s

Background information
- Origin: Tel Aviv, Israel.
- Genres: Israeli folk, Israeli rock
- Years active: 1951–1978, 1985–present
- Labels: Hed Arzi, CBS, NMC
- Spinoffs: Tsevet Havay HaNachal (The Nahal Singers)

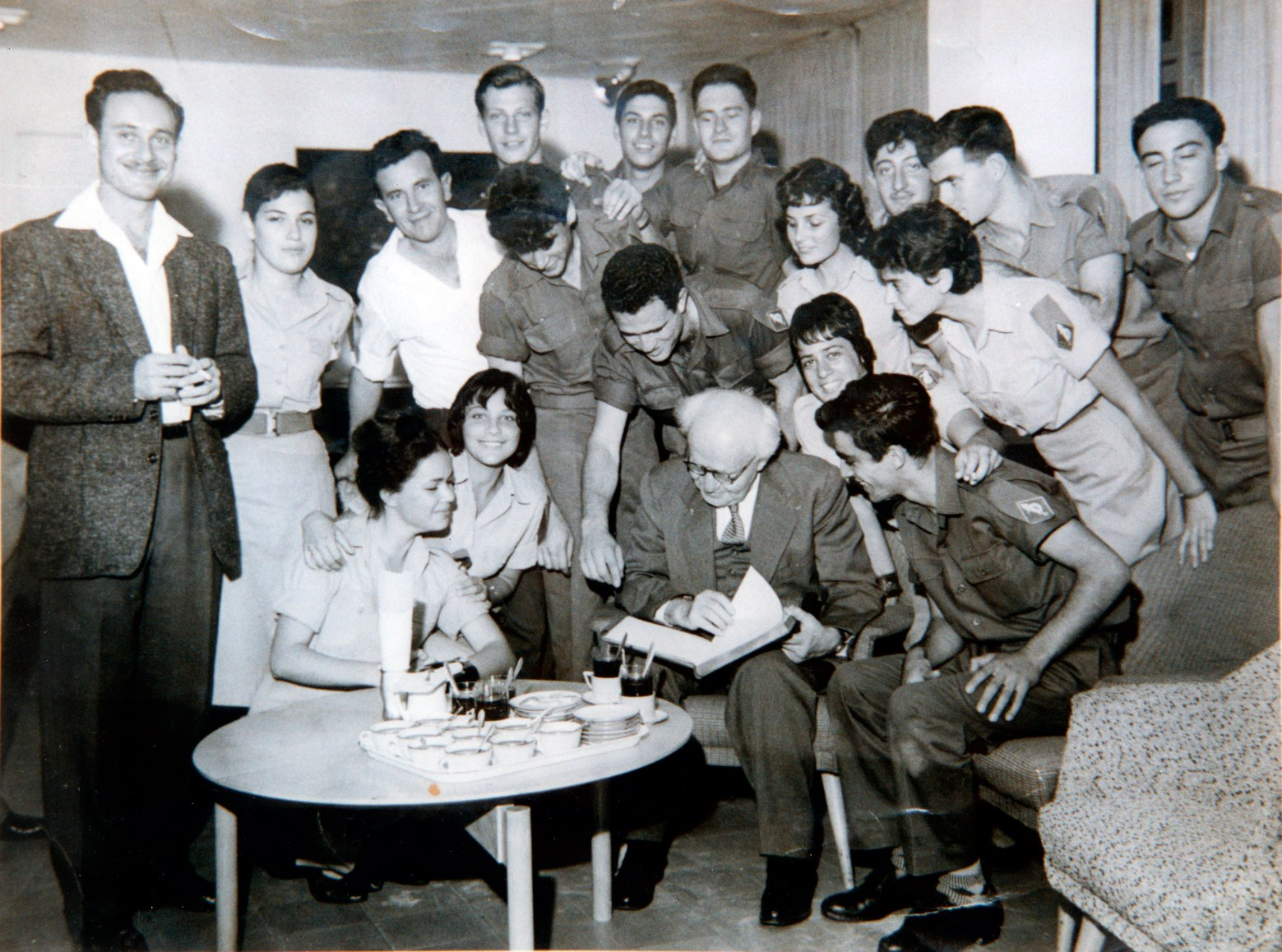
Lehakat HaNahal with David Ben-Gurion, 1960

Lehakat HaNahal (Hebrew: להקת הנח"ל; lit. The Nahal Band, also known in English as the Nahal Entertainment Troupe) is the musical military ensemble of the Nahal program of the Israel Defense Forces. Established in November 1951 (Note: Other sources say that the first program of the band, מיריק מסתדרת, "Mirik Is Doing Well", was prepared in the end of 1950, but it was not received well.) as a small ensemble with a single accordion, it developed into the most prominent and successful military troupe in Israel, known for its performances of Eretz Israel songs and becoming an integral part of Israeli culture.

== History ==
Lehakat HaNahal was the third major military ensemble to be founded in the State of Israel after the Israel Defense Forces Orchestra and the Chizbatron. Around the same time, a secondary vocal ensemble known as The Nahal Singers was also established.

In its early years, the band's repertoire was characterized by waltz-style songs dominated by accordion accompaniment. Many of these songs were written by lyricist Haim Hefer and composed by Sasha Argov or Moshe Wilensky. In the early 1960s, the band underwent significant changes in musical arrangement and production. Additional instruments such as percussion, brass, and wind instruments were introduced. This transformation culminated in the 1964 program and album Sun in the Desert, composed entirely by Naomi Shemer (a former member of the Nahal Singers).

Between the Six-Day War and the Yom Kippur War, the band experienced its most successful period and adopted a more rock-oriented musical style. During this time, it featured works by leading Israeli composers and lyricists, including Shemer, Dan Almagor, Yoram Taharlev, and Yair Rosenblum, who served as the troupe's musical director from 1967 to 1970, after serving as a member in 1965–1966.

The 1978 musical comedy film The Band depicted a fictionalized account of the ensemble during the War of Attrition and featured several of its songs. Later that year, Lehakat HaNahal, along with the other military entertainment troupes, was disbanded by directive of IDF Chief of Staff Rafael Eitan. The troupe was revived in 1985 when military ensembles were reinstated, returning with a program titled Hitchadshut (התחדשות, "Renewal").

Over the course of its history, Lehakat HaNahal produced more than 30 performance programs and several albums, including From the Nahal with Love (1966), The Nahal Is Coming (1967), and The Twenty-First Program (recorded 1969; program performed in 1968).

By the 21st century, the band—along with most Israeli military entertainment troupes—had declined in prominence. Nevertheless, many of its songs, including Shir LaShalom, have become part of the Israeli popular music canon. The band was also featured in the Israeli television series HaShir Shelanu.

== Notable members ==
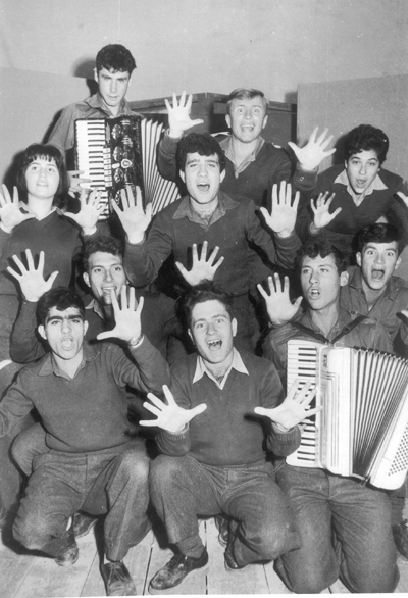
Members of the 1959 ensemble: Front row (L to R): Gavri Banai, Amiram spector, Ami Gilad (with the accordion) Second row (L to R): Yossi Prost, Arik Einstein Third row (L to R): Drora Shechori, Yehoram Gaon Fourth row (L to R): Tuval Pater (with the accordion), Avraham Segal, Aliza Rosen

- Arik Einstein
- Arik Rudich
- Chaim Topol
- Danny Sanderson
- Dov Seltzer, one of the founding members of the troupe.
- Eli Cohen
- Gavri (Gavriel) Banai, who would later form The Roosters and The Pale Tracker.
- Gidi Gov
- Hanny Nahmias
- Meir "Poogy" Fenigstein
- Miri Aloni
- Naomi Polani
- Sassi Keshet
- Shalom Hanoch
- Tuvia Tzafir
- Yair Rosenblum, later became the musical director of the band.
- Yardena Arazi, singer, actor, and member of Shokolad, Menta, Mastik, she would also record a song with the band on their comeback record in 1985.
- Yehoram Gaon, singer and actor who got his start with the Nahal Band alongside Arik Einstein and Gavri Banai.
- Yisrael Poliakov, who would also later form The Roosters and The Pale Tracker.
- Yona Atari
- Yossi Banai, one of the original members of the band

== Discography ==
- Nahal Songs-Series 1 (1956)
- Nahal Songs-Series 2 (1957)
- Nahal Songs-Series 3 (1957)
- Nahal Songs-Series 4 (1958)
- Nahal Songs-Series 5 (1959)
- Nahal Songs-as you like them (1960)
- Songs of the Nahal Band-A drop of Honey (1962)
- Sun in the Desert (1964)
- For the 18th time (1965)
- From Nahal With Love (1966)
- The Nahal Is Coming (1967)
- The Best of Nahal (1968)
- The 21st Program (1969)
- In the Nahal settlements at the Sinai (1970)
- The Palanchik/Once upon a time (1972)
- The Story of a Band-Nahal celebrates 25 years (1974)
- Renewal (1985)
- Tel Aviv Need Not Worry (1987)

== See also ==
- The Band
