= Ervinka =

1967 film by Ephraim Kishon

Chaim Topol as Ervinka: Israeli DVD cover

Ervinka (Hebrew: ארבינקא) is a 1967 Israeli film written and directed by Ephraim Kishon. The film, starring Chaim Topol (best known for his role as Tevye in Fiddler on the Roof), is a comical tale of a con man who falls in love with a police officer.

== Plot ==
Ervinka is a young man living in Tel Aviv of the 1960s. He does not believe in work, morality, law and order, and settling down. He ekes out a living as a petty con man by charging parking fees to a lot that does not belong to him, stealing electricity from his neighbors, eating for free at family events he is not invited to, and extorting money from movie directors by revving up his moped engine near their film sets. He also finds ways to con the authorities, taking advantage of the stupidity, laziness, and inefficiency of bureaucrats (a favorite subject of Kishon's work). Ervinka even ingratiates himself with the local underworld by getting them out of trouble with the law over a robbery. His only dream is to win the lottery so he would not have to get by on his wits anymore.

Ervinka's carefree life becomes complicated when he falls in love with Ruti, a police officer. While she loves him, she is equally appalled by his way of life and is concerned that he is on a slippery slope to a life of crime.

Tired of never winning the lottery, Ervinka devises a devilish con to rob the lottery offices in Tel Aviv. Under the guise of making a movie, he has his underworld friends try to crack the lottery safe open while all around him are spectators and even police officers, all under the impression that they are watching a film director at work. When the underworld has problems getting the safe to open, the police volunteers its own expert to help them so that filming could proceed as planned. Thanking them for their help, Ervinka and his friends leave with the money seconds before the authorities realize what is actually going on.

With next week's jackpot safely tucked in a bag behind his moped seat, Ervinka believes he has realized his dream. However, his police officer object of affection tracks him down, while he's making his escape. She confesses her feelings for him to be just as strong as his are for her, but makes it clear she will not associate with a criminal. Choosing her over the money, Ervinka returns the money to the General Manager of the lottery in an official ceremony just like the one he had always imagined himself receiving this money in.

== Cast ==
- Chaim Topol as Ervinka
- Gila Almagor as Ruti
- Shraga Friedman as Mr. Veinrib
- Shaike Ophir as the Police Sergeant
- Avner Hizkiyahu as Ervinka's partner Yossi
- Edna Fliedel as Liz, the neighbor
- Yossi Banai as Maurice, the neighbor & Liz's husband
- Shaike Levi as Friedrich (underworld)
- Yisrael Poliakov as Leon (underworld)
- Gavri Banai as Musa (underworld)
- Mosko Alkalai as Zigler

== Production notes ==
- Ervinka is a hypocorism of the name Ervin. In the movie, it is actually pronounced "Arbinka."
