= Giv'at Halfon Eina Ona =

- גבעת חלפון אינה עונה
- Directed by: Assi Dayan
- Written by: Assi Dayan; Naftali Alter
- Produced by: Naftali Alter; Yosef Diamant; Yitzhak Shani
- Starring: HaGashash HaHiver; Tuvia Tzafir; Miki Kam; Nitza Saul; Oshik Levi; Moshe Ish-Kassit
- Cinematography: Yaakov Kelah
- Edited by: David Tvi
- Music by: Naftali Alter; Izhak Graziani; Avner Kenner
- Release date: September 27, 1976
- Running time: 92 minutes
- Country: Israel
- Language: Hebrew

Giv'at Halfon Eina Ona (Hebrew: גבעת חלפון אינה עונה, lit. 'Halfon Hill Doesn't Answer'), also titled Giv'at Halfon, is a cult Israeli comedy film released on September 27, 1976. It is a good-hearted satire of the Israel Defense Forces, which tells the story of a reserve company guarding the Egyptian border at the Sinai Peninsula. While initially received negatively by critics, it has since become one of the most influential Israeli films.

The name of the film is a parody of the name of the Israeli patriotic film Giv'a 24 Eina Ona (Hill 24 Doesn't Answer).

The film was directed and co-written by Assi Dayan and stars members of HaGashash HaHiver: Shaike Levi, Yisrael Poliakov, and Gavri Banai.

== Plot ==
Staff Sgt. Raphael "Gingy" Moked is ordered by his company commander, Captain Shamgar, to retrieve Sergio Constanza, a deserter from reserve service. On his way he meets his girlfriend Yaeli and offers to talk to her father, Victor Hasson, to get a blessing for their relationship. Hasson gives his blessing, believing that Moked came for his older daughter Shifra, but throws him out of the house after finding out this was not so. Yaeli does not wish to part from Moked, and sneaks into a suitcase in his jeep. Meanwhile, Constanza tricks several other gamblers into losing thousands of dollars, which he intends to use to repay a debt to Mr. Hasson. The gamblers find out about the plot however, which leaves Sergio with no choice but to run away to the army with Moked.

Moked and Constanza make it to a military camp in the Sinai, and Mr. Hasson follows them, posing as Constanza at the gate to get admission. When he is not allowed into the base, he steals a front loader to break in. Meanwhile, Moked finds out that Yaeli came with them, and Constanza comes up with a plot to make her an authorized visitor, by claiming that she is a singer/entertainer sent from the Education Corps. Mr. Hasson arrives at the base with the loader, and is caught by the soldiers in a fishing net. Shamgar reports the incident to the brigadier. Shamgar then meets with Yaeli, who calls herself "Bule-Bule", in private and they start dancing African dances half-nude, as she attempts to persuade him that she's an entertainer.

As the brigadier is about to arrive, Moked releases Mr. Hasson, who is forced to temporarily reconcile with Constanza. The brigadier finds Shamgar dancing alone and making noises, deems him insane, and takes him away in his helicopter, leaving Moked temporarily in command of the outpost. It is discovered that Mr. Hasson is an excellent cook. He transforms the military kitchen into a restaurant-like establishment, and then denies Constanza access. In revenge, Constanza tricks Hasson into buying a plot of nearby desert land, which Hasson believes to be an oil field, from him as payment of the debt.

Constanza then tries to help Moked by matching one of the soldiers, Wasserman, with Yaeli's older sister, Shifra. But when Shifra arrives at the base, she isn't impressed with Wasserman, but falls in love with Constanza instead. Hasson leaves the base to catch fish for the soldiers' dinners, but accidentally crosses the border into Egypt and is taken captive by an Egyptian patrol. While in captivity, Victor becomes friends with the Egyptian commanding officer, who grew up in the same area as him. In the meantime, the Israeli soldiers plan a rescue mission to return the captured Hasson. Although the mission, dubbed "Operation Waldheim" doesn't go as planned, Gingy and Constanza, posing as UN observers, succeed in returning Hasson to the base.

When Hasson returns to the base, he discovers that Sergio had conned him once again, and that the plot of land he bought from him wasn't really an oil field at all. Out of nowhere, Capt. Shamgar reappears, still searching for "Bule-Bule". He falls into a pit dug by Hasson on the plot of land, causing an oil geyser to appear and revealing the presence of oil in the land after all. The film ends with Hasson, Moked and Constanza, now his sons-in-law, selling the oil from the back of a truck in Tel Aviv, early in the morning.

== Cast ==
- Staff Sgt. Raphael "Gingy" Moked (Gavri Banai) - an IDF non-commissioned officer, in love with Mr. Hasson's younger daughter Yaeli. Sent to retrieve the absentee Sergio Constanza and bring him to do his reserve service.
- Sergio Constanza (Yisrael Poliakov) - a Romanian-born conman, who has repeatedly failed to report for reserve duty. He leaves with Gingy for the Sinai in order to escape a several-thousand-dollar debt to Mr. Hasson and other gamblers in Tel Aviv. Sergio is a charming, funny, cunning, and manipulative crook.
- Victor Hasson (Shaike Levi) - a wealthy Egyptian Jew, who immigrated to Israel and now lives in Tel Aviv with his two daughters, and is determined to get the older daughter, Shifra, married. He pursues Sergio into the Sinai in order to collect a large debt. The scene where Hasson lifts Sergio's field-toilet cabin with a loader-bulldozer became a classic.
- Yaeli Hasson (Nitza Shaul) - Mr Hasson's younger daughter and Gingy's girlfriend. They want to get married but Mr. Hasson refuses his consent until he can marry off his older daughter, Shifra. Following Hasson's refusal, Yaeli sneaks into Gingy's jeep and finds herself in the Sinai base.
- Shifra Hasson (Miki Kam) - Mr. Hasson's older daughter.
- Yosifoun (Moshe Ish-Kasit) - the big, strong, but inept cook in the Sinai base.
- Capt. Shamgar (Tuvia Tzafir) - the horny company commander of the Sinai post.

The film also features Hana Laszlo, Oshik Levi and Reuven Adiv

== Reception ==
Contemporary reviews of Giv'at Halfon Eina Ona were negative, with critics criticizing the film for its humor and direction. In a review on Davar, Zeʼev Rav-Nof wrote that the film's success was unlikely and that the situations it presented are "pale and banal".

In 2021 Lior Ben Ami described it as "the cult film that no Independence Day is complete without". He wrote that it was bashed by critics, but the audience loved it, and until now the lines from the film are being quoted.

In 2025 the Ministry of Education of Israel included the film, together with a number of other prominent films, "which have become an integral part of Israeli popular culture", into the curriculum on film and media, mentioning it among "cult films and blockbuster films".

== Legacy sequel ==
In 2025, the shooting of a legacy sequel under the tentative name Giv'at Halfon 338 was announced. It will be set in modern times. It will not be a direct continuation of the old film, but with the same absurd humor and satire, based on modern elements. The film will be directed by Erez Ben Harush. This followed up on a previous attempt at a sequel by Dayan in 1983 that never came to fruition.
