= Dr. Pomerantz =

- Directed by: Assi Dayan
- Written by: Assi Dayan
- Produced by: Eyal Shiray
- Starring: Assi Dayan; Michael Hanegbi; Rivka Michaeli
- Cinematography: Boaz Yehonatan Yaacov
- Edited by: Zohar M. Sela
- Music by: Amit Poznansky
- Release dates: October 18, 2011 (Haifa Film Festival); February 23, 2012 (Theatrical release)
- Running time: 88 minutes
- Country: Israel
- Language: Hebrew
- Budget: $250,000

Dr. Pomerantz (Hebrew: ד"ר פומרנץ) is a 2011 Israeli film directed by and starring Assi Dayan. It premiered in 2011 at the 27th Haifa International Film Festival and was theatrically released in Israel on February 23, 2012. The film was nominated for Best Screenplay at the Ophir Awards in September 2012. The film became Dayan's final as a director as well as an actor, before his death in May 2014.

In the film, Dayan plays a clinical psychologist named Dr. Yoel Pomerantz. Pomerantz's life is one big mess, both personally and professionally. His wife committed suicide because she thought their 5-year-old son was intellectually disabled. The son, Yoav (Michael Hanegbi), who is now 30 years old, actually has Asperger syndrome. He works as a traffic inspector and more than anything else, loves to affix traffic tickets to car windshields.

The film was met with mostly favorable reviews, though did very poor business at the Israeli Box office. The film initially remained unreleased on DVD, and was only available through VOD. But shortly after Dayan's death, the film saw a first DVD release in June 2014.

== Plot ==
The film depicts Dr. Yoel Pomerantz (Asi Dayan), a clinical psychologist in the twilight of his professional and personal life, living with his son Yoav (Michael Henig), who has Asperger's syndrome and works as a parking attendant. The two seemingly function and survive their lives in hardship, but the gap between their daily lives and their personal and social functioning becomes increasingly apparent throughout the plot. This gap is central to the film, both in terms of its macabre humor and its existential message, embodied by Dr. Pomerantz's explanation to his suicidal patients: "Life is a disease with 100% mortality."

== Cast ==
- Assi Dayan – Dr. Yoel Pomerantz
- Michael Hanegbi – Yoav Pomerantz
- Rivka Michaeli – Rebecca Zimmer
- Shlomo Vishinsky – Izhak Bar-Ner
- Gavri Banai – Himself
- Shlomo Bar-Shavit – Vladek Nusbaum
- Shmil Ben Ari – Yossi Sherman
