= We Are Both from the Same Village =

"Anachnu Shnaynu Meoto Hakfar"
- "Join Us In The Valley", the program and album the song is from.

Single by Central Command Band

from the album Join Us In The Valley
- Language: Hebrew
- English title: We Are Both From The Same Village
- Released: 1969
- Genre: Israeli folk
- Label: Parlophone
- Songwriter: Naomi Shemer

"We Are Both from the Same Village" (Hebrew: אנחנו שנינו מאותו הכפר, romanized: Anachnu Shnaynu Meoto Hakfar) is a memorial poem written in 1966 by the Israeli composer Naomi Shemer that she set to music in 1969 for it to be recorded by the Central Command Band. It tells about the friendship between two friends from the same village, one of whom was killed in battle.

The song is often played on Yom HaZikaron on the radio or live.

== Background ==
The song commemorates two Israeli soldiers, Zabel (Hebrew: זאב עמית) and Yosef Regev (Hebrew: יוסף רגב). Both men in the song, who were born in 1927, lived in the same moshav, Nahalal, fought side by side in the 1947–1949 Palestine war, and served in the 101st Moshe Dayan Parachute Regiment and the Mossad. Israeli poets have written poems about these two men since 1955. While in Paris in 1964, Shemer learned about the two men and met with Yosef Regev to learn about their comradeship in battle. As a result, she wrote "We Are Both from the Same Village." The poem included a passage in which one of the two men died, and it was published in 1967. The song was first performed at a music festival in 1969.

During the Yom Kippur War, Zabel volunteered to join Ariel Sharon's 143rd Legion, which was fighting in the Sinai Peninsula. When Zabel was killed by an Egyptian Army artillery shell on October 17, 1973, this poem came true.

== Influence ==
- In 1993, the Israeli television network on Tuesday chose "We Are Both from the Same Village" as Shemer's second most popular song after "Jerusalem of Gold."
- This song was the only one performed at Sharon's state funeral on January 13, 2014.

== See also ==
- Music of Israel
- How do I bless thee?, another memorial song from the same time period.
