= Gavri Banai =

Israeli entertainer (born 1939)

- גברי בנאי
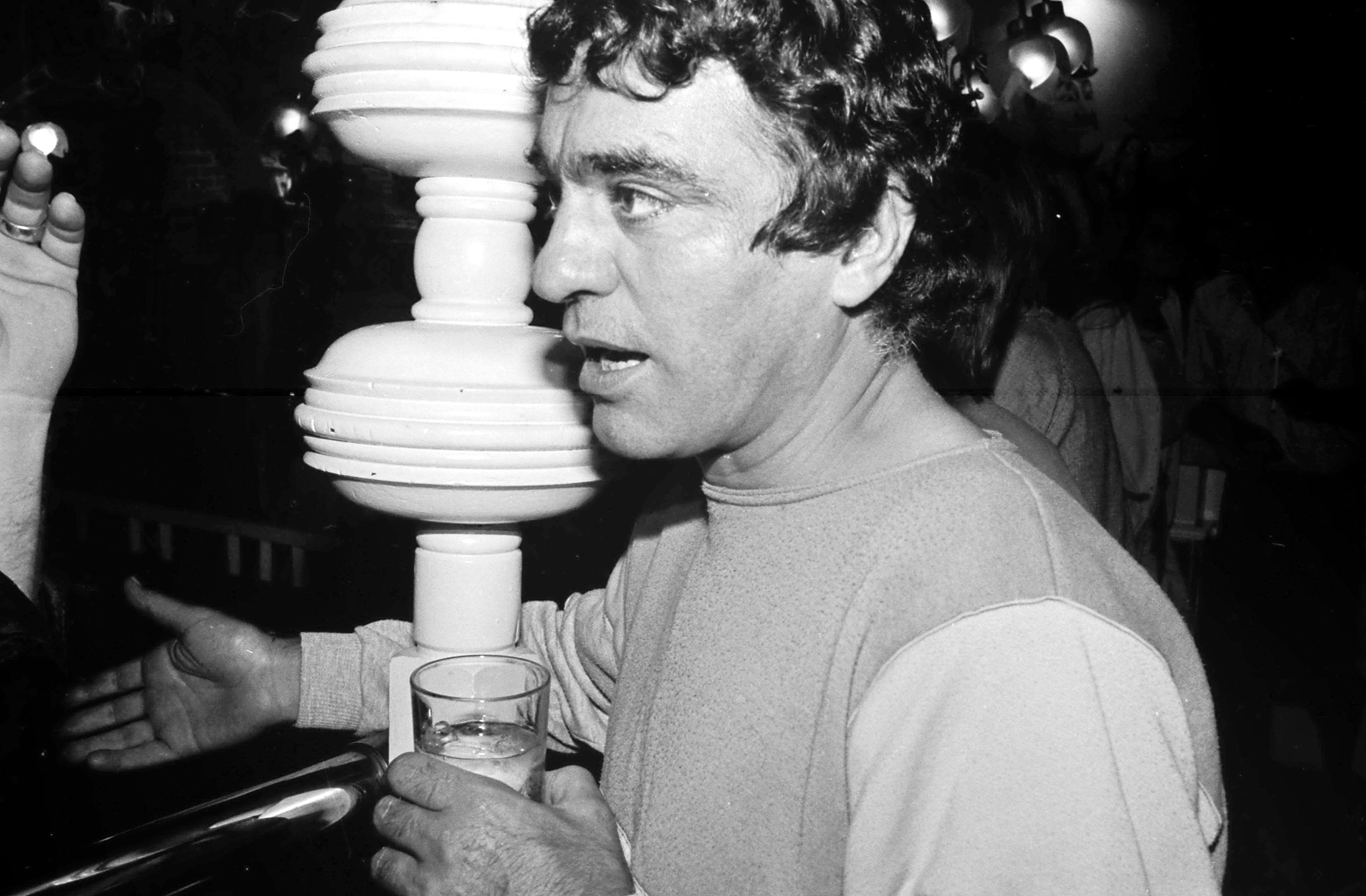
- Banai in 1985
- Born: Gabriel Banai; 9 July 1939 (age 87); Jerusalem, Mandatory Palestine
- Occupations: Actor; comedian; singer
- Years active: 1958–present
- Known for: Lehakat HaNahal; HaTarnegolim; HaGashash HaHiver
- Children: 3, including Uri and Boaz
- Relatives: Banai family
- Awards: Israel Prize (2000)

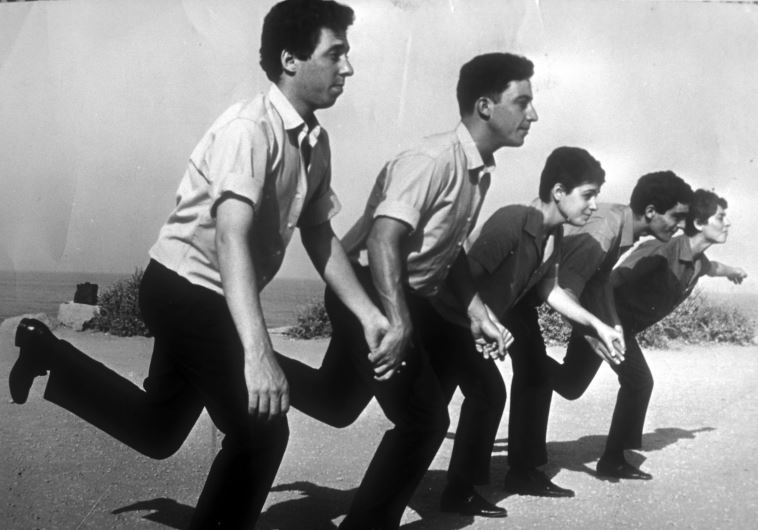
HaTarnegolim, 1963. Gavri Banai is the second from the right

Gabriel "Gavri" Banai (Hebrew: גבריאל "גברי" בנאי; born 9 July 1939) is an Israeli actor, singer, and comedian best known for being the part of the trio HaGashash HaHiver.

Banai was born in Jerusalem to the large Banai family (as the youngest one of eight children) of Iranian Jews. He began his entertainment career during military service with Lehakat HaNahal.

== Awards ==
- 2000: the Israel Prize for lifetime achievement and contribution to society and the State of Israel along his with his HaGashash HaHiver colleagues, Shaike Levi and Yisrael Poliakov.
- 2020: Tel Aviv-Yafo Municipality award, together with Shaike Levi. The award reason states that the popular entertainment trio "influenced Israeli culture, the Hebrew language and society in all its aspects".
- 2021: Israeli Artists' Association Lifetime Achievement Award

== Selected filmography ==
- Ervinka
- Giv'at Halfon Eina Ona
- Schlager
- Dr. Pomerantz
