= Yisrael Poliakov =

Israeli comedian and actor (1941–2007)

- ישראל פוליאקוב
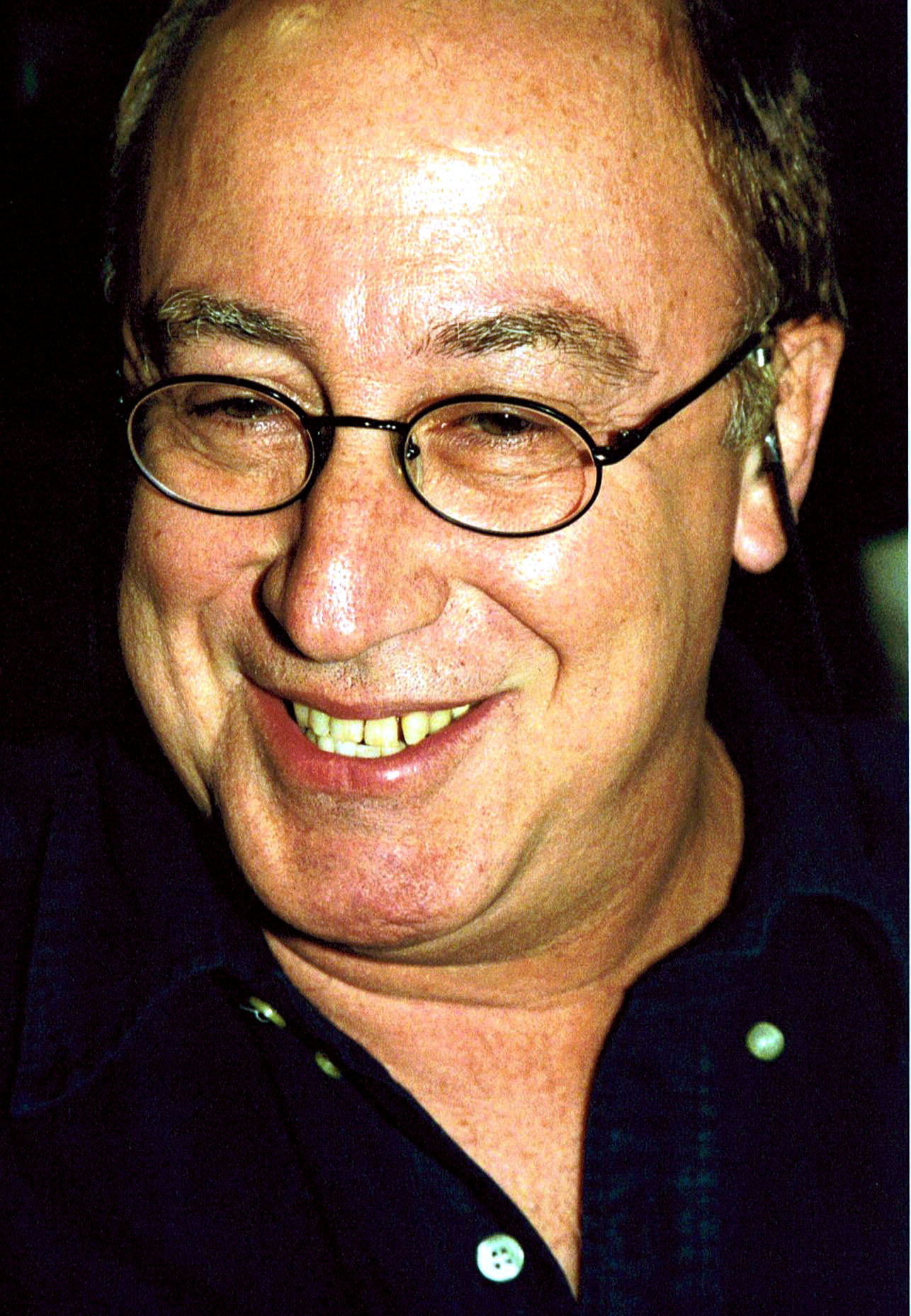
- Born: 7 July 1941; Jerusalem, Mandatory Palestine
- Died: 30 October 2007 (aged 66); Petah Tikva, Israel
- Other name: Poli
- Occupations: Actor; comedian
- Years active: 1964–2007
- Spouse: Shosh Poliakov
- Children: 3, including Yael Poliakov
- Father: Shlomo Poliakov
- Relatives: Avraham Nudelman (uncle)
- Awards: Israel Prize (2000)

Yisrael "Poli" Poliakov (Hebrew: ישראל פוליאקוב; 7 July 1941 – 30 October 2007) was an Israeli comedian and actor. Poliakov was born in Jerusalem, and grew up in Tel Aviv. He became one of the three members of the Israeli comedy group, HaGashash HaHiver (The Pale Tracker).

== Career ==
Born in Jerusalem and the son of footballer Shlomo Poliakov, he originally chose a career as a farmer and studied at the Kfar HaYarok agricultural high school. This changed when he was spotted at a school party by members of Nahal Brigade's entertainment troupe, and he was soon recruited by the group. In 1961, he joined the original singing band HaTarnegolim (The Roosters) that had been founded by Naomi Polani, the original cast of which broke up in 1964.

Poliakov appeared in a number of famous Israeli films, often with members of HaGashash HaHiver. His film credits include Schlager (The Hit) in 1979; Krav al Hava'ad (The House Committee) in 1986; and Givat Halfon Eina Ona (Halfon Hill Doesn't Answer) in 1975. He appeared in a number of Israeli television roles, and produced and acted in his daughter's television show, Hakol Dvash (Everything is Honey (Note: הכל דבש, "everything is honey" is an Israeli cliche meaning "Everything is OK")).

Poliakov began working on stage as a theater actor in 2000. His credits include The Israeli Family, The Rubber Merchants, God's Finger, Mother Courage and Her Children and The Return of Moris Shpigelman.

=== HaGashash HaHiver ===
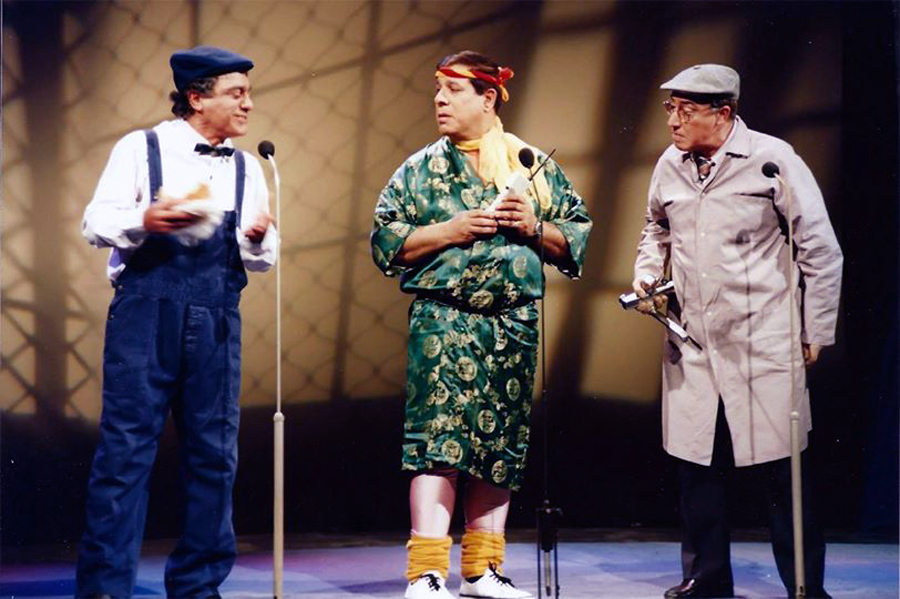
right to left: "Poli", "Shaike", "Gavri"

Avraham Deshe ("Pachanel"), a producer and agent who died of cancer in 2004 at age 78, started HaGashash HaHiver in late 1963. The group was composed of three members – Poliakov, Yeshayahu "Shaike" Levi and Gavriel "Gavri" Banai. They created a "unique Israeli comedy group," according to the Jerusalem Post. Their jokes, which included the best and worst of Israeli society, often achieved a cult status among fans.

In 2000, the group and its three members were awarded the Israel Prize for lifetime achievement & special contribution to society for their work. The judges wrote of their award decision:

The uniqueness of HaGashash HaHiver is in its two faces: On the one hand, it reflects the life and the culture that were created in Israel during its first 50 years and in the course of wars, immigration absorption and the struggle for its existence. On the other hand, it has taken an active role in shaping this culture, creating its language and sketching its identity.... Their language, Gashashit, and the images they created broke the walls of the inflexible Hebrew language and became standard idiomatic phrases, so much so that he who doesn't know them doesn't know a large part of the culture that has sprouted here. Phrases such as, 'Drive in peace, the keys are inside,' 'There was an engine?' [referring to a mechanic who cheats a client], 'Israbluff' and many others that became part of our everyday language.

== Death ==
Yisrael Poliakov died of liver cancer at the Rabin Medical Center-Beilinson Campus in Petah Tikva on October 30, 2007, at the age of 66, following a two-week hospitalization for heart problems. Poliakov's coffin was taken to Cameri Theater in Tel Aviv for a public memorial service, and was buried in a cemetery in Kibbutz Einat.

Fellow HaGashash HaHiver member Yeshayahu Levy told Israel Army Radio: "...lost a brother. There is no other word. We've been together since 1958, and he was part of me. He was a great talent, an outstanding comic actor, and a wonderful friend... The pain is great."

Actor Moshe Ivgi, who costarred with Poliakov in The Rubber Merchant, told the Jerusalem Post: "He was a great actor who was blessed with comic and dramatic qualities, and it was a pleasure to work with him. Poli was a modest and ego-free man, full of love, and I am sure he would have done so much more."

President Shimon Peres stated "Generations upon generations watched him and fell captive to his charm".

== Filmography ==
| Year | Title | Role | Notes |
|---|---|---|---|
| 1964 | Mishpahat Simhon | | |
| 1966 | Moishe Ventilator | | |
| 1966 | Fortuna | | |
| 1967 | Ervinka | Leon | |
| 1968 | Ha-Shehuna Shelanu | | |
| 1969 | Lifnei Maher | | |
| 1970 | Hitromamut | | |
| 1976 | Giv'at Halfon Eina Ona | Sergio Konstanza | |
| 1977 | Hamesh Ma'ot Elef Shahor | | |
| 1979 | Schlager | Zigi Fuchsman | |
| 1980 | Kohav Hashahar | | |
| 1986 | Ha-Krav Al HaVa'ad | Dr. Zigmund Shoresh | |
| 1997 | Campaign | | |
| 1999 | Gufa BaCholot | | |
| 2004 | Ha-Bsora Al-Pi Elohim | | |
| 2006 | Lemarit Ain | Oria | |

== Personal life ==
In 1967 he married actress Rina Ganor but after a few years the two divorced. In 1971 he married a second time to singer Riki Gal; they divorced in 1975. After that he married a third time to actress Shosh Poliakov (nee Mishal), with whom he was married until his death. He and Shosh had two sons: Itamar and Ariel, and a daughter, Yael Poliakov.

== See also ==
- List of Israel Prize recipients
