= Lior Ben Ami =

Israeli journalist and editor

- ליאור בן עמי
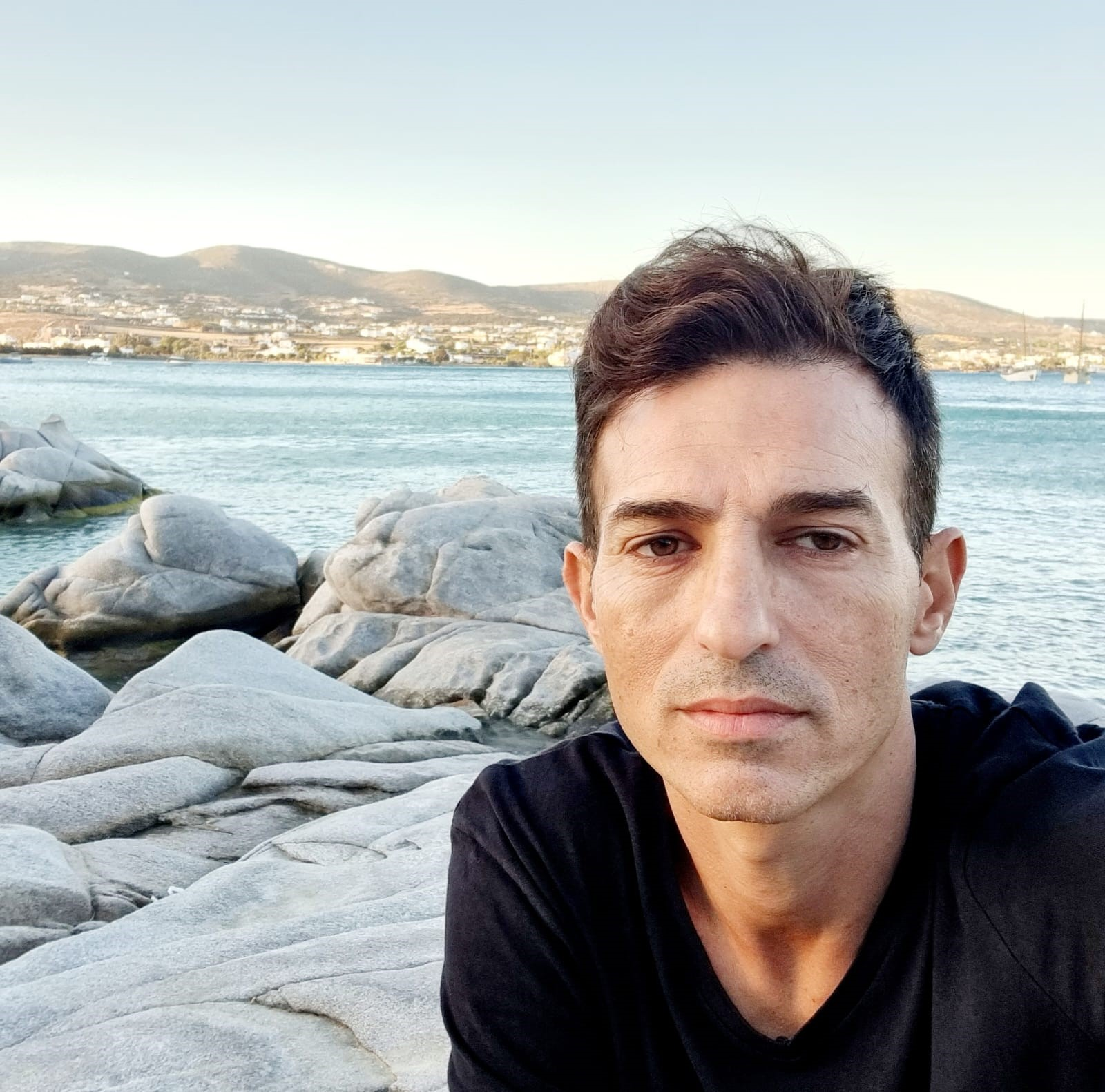
- Born: February 15, 1975 (age 51); Bat Yam, Israel
- Education: Bar-Ilan University (Bachelor of communication and political science)
- Occupations: Journalist, Editor, Author

Lior Ben Ami (Hebrew: ליאור בן עמי; born February 15, 1975) is an Israeli journalist, publicist and editor. He previously served as the head of the research department of Yedioth Ahronoth.

== Biography ==
Ben Ami was born in Bat Yam, on February 15, 1975. He holds a bachelor's degree in communication and political science from Bar-Ilan University, as well as a bachelor's and master's degree in Law. He is married with three children. Lives in Ness Ziona.

== Career as an editor ==
In the mid-1990s, Ben Ami began working in media news. He served as the editor-in-chief of the local Yediot HaDrom and as the editor-in-chief of the network's three HaSharon locales. Later he was appointed deputy editor of the "7 Days" Yedioth Ahronoth supplement.

In April 2008, Ben Ami founded the research department of Yedioth Ahronoth and headed it for about a decade. Under him, the research department published numerous cases of corruption, the correction of injustices, state auditor reports and police investigations. Among the investigations exposed and published: a series of investigations into the thousands of organs preserved at the Institute of Abu Kabir Forensic Institute against the law; the disclosure of the past of Richard Goldstone, the judge behind the investigative report on Operation Cast Lead, who sent Africans to be hanged, and served the racial laws of South Africa during the apartheid era; exposing the gas business of Avriel Bar Yossef, the deputy chief of staff for national security; a series of investigations on the former chairman of the local government center, Shlomo Bohbot who used his position to do good to his associates. A series of investigations on what is happening at the Lottery Factory, and at the Israel Institute for Biological Research. Exposing the affair of Ronan Bar Shira, the crook who raised funds for Gilad Shalit; exposing a network of organ dealers, exposing a university that awards fictitious degrees, exposing hidden cameras in doctors' rooms.

Over the years he has served as the editor of holiday supplements and special supplements.

Among other things, he served as the editor of the 50th Anniversary of the Yom Kippur War Supplement.

== Career as a writer ==
During 2023, a short story he wrote, "The Pioneer of Terezin", was published in, "Saturday was Saturday", a collection of short stories about football, compiled by Dudu Bossi.
