= HaTarnegolim =

Israeli pop band (1960–1963)

The Roosters התרנגולים
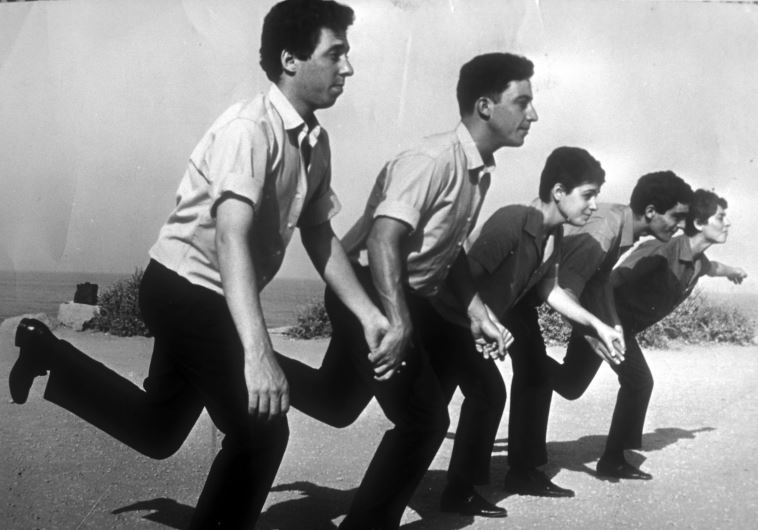
- The Roosters in 1963

Background information
- Origin: Tel Aviv, Israel.
- Genres: Israeli pop
- Years active: 1960–1963
- Label: Hed Arzi Music
- Spinoffs: HaGashash HaHiver
- Award: Kinor David
- Past members: Yehoram Gaon; Hanan Goldblatt; Yisrael Poliakov; Gavri Banai; Shaike Levi

HaTarnegolim (Hebrew: התרנגולים, lit. 'The Roosters') was an Israeli musical group that performed throughout the years of 1960–1963. It operated under the direction and musical guidance of Naomi Polani and was composed of veterans of Israeli military ensembles who previously worked with Polani.

The initial suggestion came from the members of Lehakat HaNahal (Yehoram Gaon, Yisrael Poliakov, Hanan Goldblatt, Amiram Spector, and Tuval Peter), who wanted to continue a similar work together after their discharge from the military. Somewhat later, they were joined by Zvika Gretel, Yossi Tzemach, and Shaike Levi.

In 1963, their song, The Neighborhood Song (Haim Hefer and Sasha Argov) was selected the "Song of the Year" at the Israeli Annual Hebrew Song Chart. The group disbanded after the return from an international tour. That same year, they won the Kinor David award.

== History ==
=== Background ===
Before the Roosters formed in 1961, its band members were predominantly members of Lehakat HaNahal (Yehoram Gaon, Yisrael Poliakov, Hanan Goldblatt, Amiram Spector, and Tuval Peter), all of whom wanted to continue collaborating with one another past their military service. They went to Naomi Polani, who agreed to help direct the band.

=== 1961: First Program and album ===
The band's first program premiered on Israeli Independence Day in 1961. There was some controversy around the program due to the fact that two of the band's members had not yet been discharged from their military service. Despite this, the program enjoyed overwhelming success and received praise for its music and comedy. Despite the success, the band did not tour that much to support the program. The program received an album issued by Hed Arzi Music. The first program's repertoire included songs from HaChizbatron and Hebrew translations of French songs.

== Legacy ==
In 1998, Polani created the show "The Roosters Return" (התרנגולים חוזרים), but it did not include any new songs and was seen mostly as a throwback.

== Discography ==
- The Roosters-First Program (1961)
- The Roosters-Second Program (1963)
