= Schlager (film) =

1979 Israeli comedy musical film

- Directed by: Assi Dayan
- Release date: 1979
- Country: Israel

Schlager (Hebrew: שלאגר), or The Hit, is a 1979 Israeli comedy musical film. The script and lyrics writer and director was Assi Dayan, the music was written by Svika Pick, and the stars were HaGashash HaHiver (The Trackers) trio. Compared to other projects of Dayan, Pick or The Trackers, this film did not sell well and did not take central place in the Israeli culture. However, one of its songs, "Shir Ha'frecha" ("The Bimbo Song"), performed by Ofra Haza, became Haza's signature song.

== Plot ==
Dr. Shooky Heftzibah's dancing school is in serious debt and Heftzibah is looking for people he can convince to pay him large sums. He is reuniting with his long-forgotten friend, the lazy garage owner and widower Ziggy Fuchsman, promising to find Fuchsman a new wife if he pays Heftzibah's debts. However, Heftzibah's debts are so large that he must look for a rich new wife for his friend. Heftzibah reads obituaries and takes Fuchsman to a shiva in order to seduce the new widow, while Heftzibah and Fuchsman pretend to be friends of the deceased. Their deception is exposed, but the widow, Gilah, starts to date Fuchsman.

Meanwhile, Heftzibah finds another sucker, Ben-Gurion Shemesh, a gullible young worker of Fuchsman's who dreams of being a disco dancing and singing star, and of marrying Fuchsman's daughter Dina, who does not like him. Heftzibah trains Shemesh and turns him into a big showman. In order to keep impressing him, Heftzibah takes Shemesh behind the scenes of the opera to show him he knows important people in show business. Accidentally, Heftzibah and Shemesh find themselves dressed up as opera singers on the stage. Fuchsman, who is sitting with Gilah in the audience and has just found out that Gilah is not rich, climbs on the stage too, dressed up as an opera singer, in order to take revenge on Heftzibah.

After finding out that he can sing opera, Shemesh leaves Heftzibah and climbs onstage at a night club, giving an impressive performance and gaining Dina's heart as well as a job for a pop producer. Fuchsman, who had another groom in mind for his daughter, and Heftzibah, who has lost his customer, try to sabotage Shemesh's first performance on TV like they sabotaged the opera, but the audience likes the result and all three main characters are turned into stars.

== Song list ==
Song list:

1. "לצאת לצאת", performing: שייקה לוי
2. "שיר בהזדמנות", Performing: גברי בנאי
3. "גראז'", Performing: צביקה פיק
4. "שיר לעזבון", Performing: שייקה לוי וגברי בנאי וישראל פוליאקוב
5. "דיסקו-טנגו", Performing: שייקה לוי וגברי בנאי
6. "שיר הפרחה", Performing: עפרה חזה
7. "תן גז", Performing: גברי בנאי
8. "אכלנו אותה", Performing: שייקה לוי וישראל פוליאקוב
9. "בתיה לאמבטיה", Performing: שייקה לוי וישראל פוליאקוב
10. "שלאגר", Performing: עפרה חזה, שייקה לוי, גברי בנאי וישראל פוליאקוב
