= Hakol Dvash =

Hakol Dvash (Hebrew: הכל דבש, Everything is Honey (Note: הכל דבש, "everything is honey" is an Israeli cliche meaning "everything is OK")) is an Israeli comedy-drama TV series created by Yael Poliakov broadcast by Channel 2 in two seasons, 2007 and 2010. The series is around comical situations in Yael's family, where she and her father Yisrael Poliakov played themselves in the first season. In the first season the mother was played by Shosh Atari, in the second - by Yael's real-life mother, Shosh Poliakov.

At the 2008 Awards of the Israeli Television Academy the series won all awards in the comedy category: best series, best actor (Yisrael Poliakov), best actress (Yael Poliakov), best directing (Oded Davidoff), and best screenwriting (Yael Poliakov, Omer Tadmor).

After the first season, Yisrael and Shosh Atari died.

The third season was cancelled due to dropped ratings.
