= Yael Poliakov =

Israeli actress (born 1977)

- יעל פוליאקוב
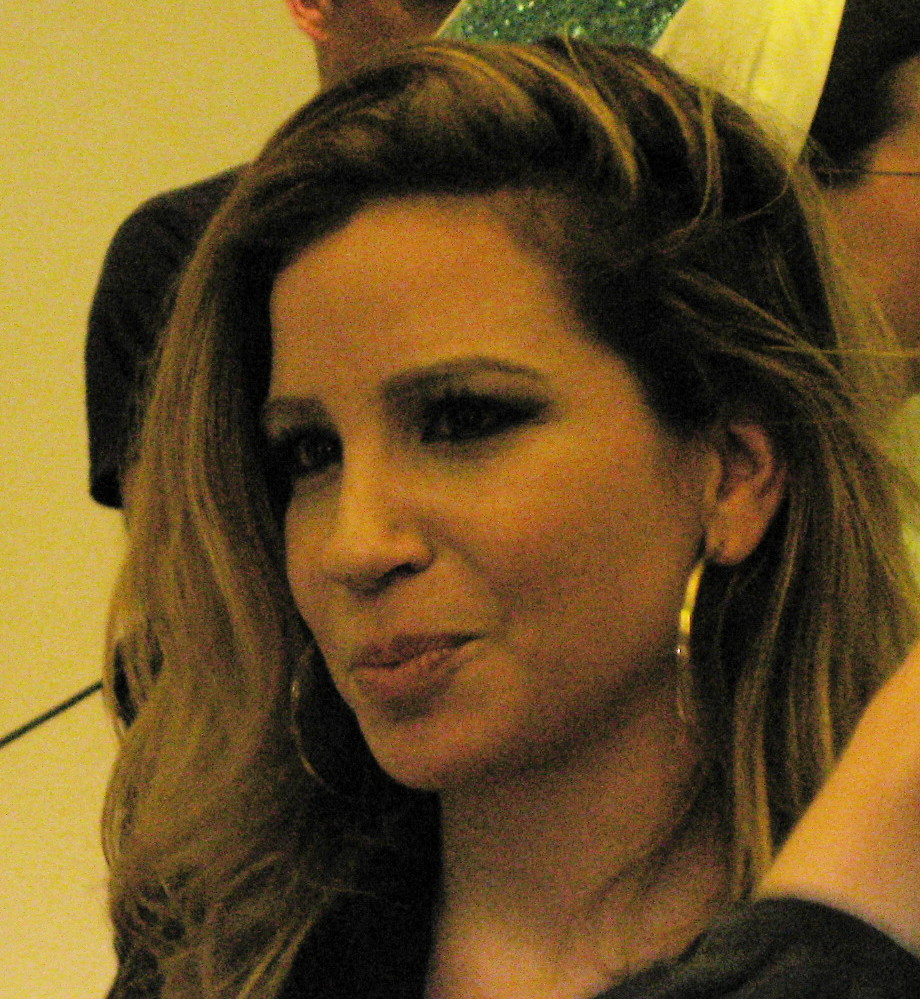
- Poliakov in 2008
- Born: 14 March 1977 (age 49); Tel Aviv, Israel
- Occupations: Actor; comedian; television presenter; screenwriter
- Years active: 1992–present
- Parents: Yisrael Poliakov (father); Shosh Poliakov (mother)
- Relatives: Shlomo Poliakov (grandfather)

Yael Poliakov (Hebrew: יעל פוליאקוב; born 14 March 1977), is an Israeli actress, comedian, television presenter and screenwriter.

She is the daughter of Israeli actor Yisrael Poliakov and actress Shosh Poliakov.

== Awards ==
- 2010: Israeli Television Academy award for Best Actress in a Comedy Series and Best Screenplay in a Comedy Series for Hakol Dvash comedy drama series
