= Yehoram Gaon =

Israeli musical artist (born 1939)

Yehoram Gaon יהורם גאון
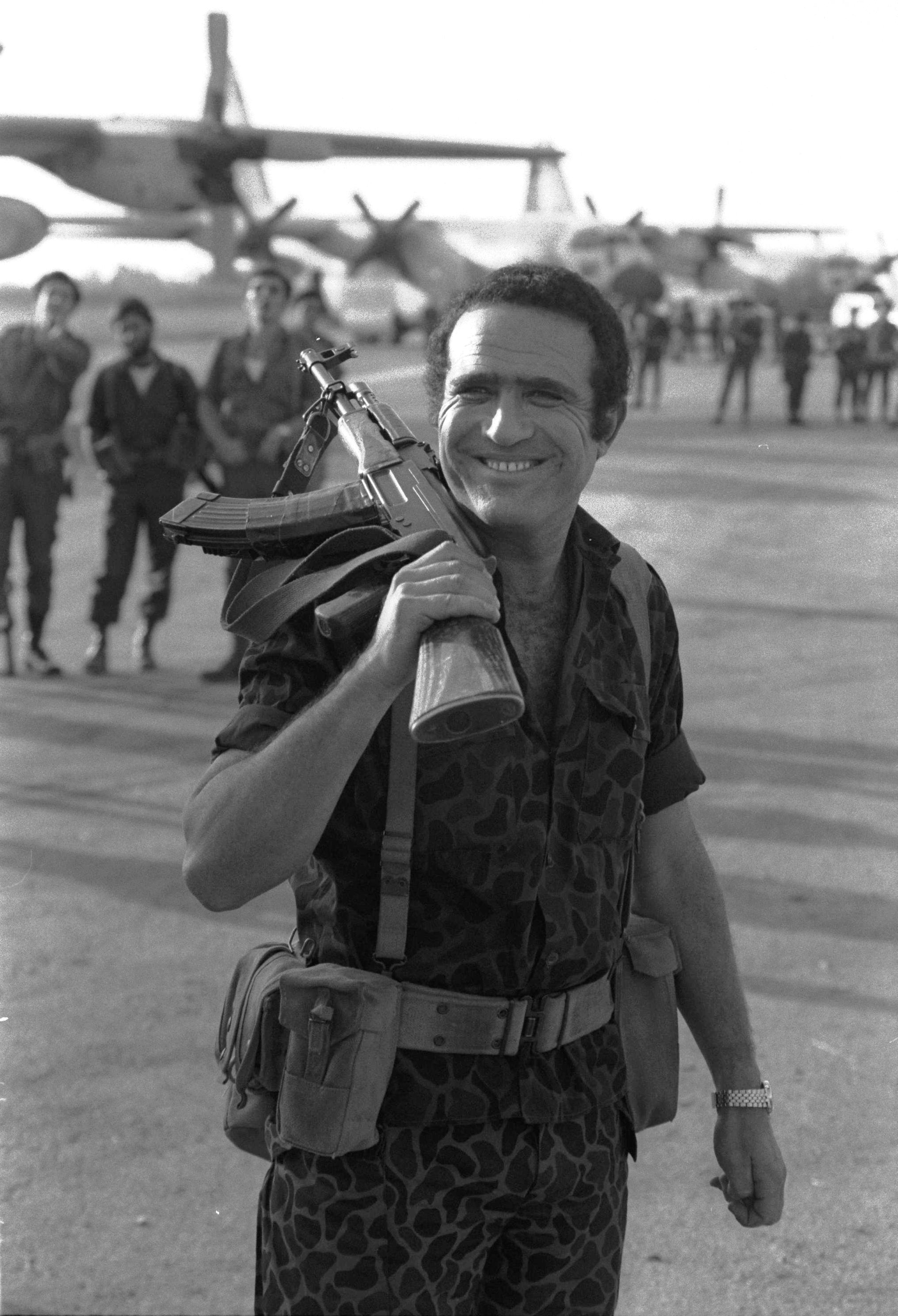
- Gaon in set of the film "Operation Thunderbolt", 1976

Background information
- Born: December 28, 1939 (age 86); Jerusalem, British Mandate of Palestine (now Israel)
- Origin: Jerusalem, Israel
- Genres: Israeli pop; Israeli rock; Piyyut
- Years active: 1957–present
- Label: Hed Arzi Music
- Formerly of: The Nahal Band; The Roosters; The Yarkon Bridge Trio

Yehoram Gaon (Hebrew: יהורם גאון; born December 28, 1939) is an Israeli singer, actor, director, comedian, producer, television and radio host, and public figure. He has also authored and edited works books on the culture of Israel.

Born in Jerusalem to Sephardic Jewish parents—his father of Bosnian descent and his mother of Turkish descent, both immigrants to Mandatory Palestine—Gaon became an early prominent figure representing Sephardic heritage in Israeli popular culture.

== Early life ==
Gaon was born in 1939 in Beit HaKerem, Jerusalem. His father, Moshe David Gaon (1889–1958), was a historian born in Sarajevo to a Sephardic Jewish family. He immigrated to British mandatory Palestine, where his family had lived for several generations, and worked as a schoolmaster and Hebrew teacher in Jerusalem, Buenos Aires, and İzmir. Moshe David Gaon was also known as a poet and scholar of Ladino. While in Turkey, he met and married Sara Hakim, and the couple later settled in Jerusalem.

His brothers are Yigal, Kalila Armon, and Benny Gaon, a businessman and industrialist who died of cancer in 2008.

Gaon has two children from his marriage to Orna Goldfarb, Moshe-David and Hila. In January 2026, Gaon remarried to Ella Lusa.

== Media career ==
=== Singing ===
In 1957, Gaon enlisted in the Israel Defense Forces, where he joined Lehakat HaNahal, marking the beginning of his career in the performing arts.

Gaon was a member of the singing group HaTarnegolim ("The Roosters"), founded by Naomi Polani, from its establishment in 1960 until its disbandment in 1963. He subsequently helped form the Yarkon Bridge Trio, which he left in 1965. In 1969, he performed Ballad for the Medic, a song written by Dan Almagor and composed by Effi Netzer, at the Israel Song Festival, where he won first place and also took second place with another song written by Yoram Taharlev. Ballad for the Medic has remained controversial in Israel and is generally played only on Yom HaZikaron, at Netzer’s request.

Gaon became widely recognized for his rendition of Naomi Shemer’s Od Lo Ahavti Dai ("I Haven’t Loved Enough Yet"), which also served as the title track of his 1977 album featuring songs with themes of nature. In 1994, he performed at the Nobel Peace Prize ceremony honoring Yitzhak Rabin, Shimon Peres, and Yasser Arafat in Oslo. In 2009, he recorded Shir Ha’avoda Vehamlacha for the organization Pioneers for a Cure, with proceeds benefiting the Israel Cancer Association.

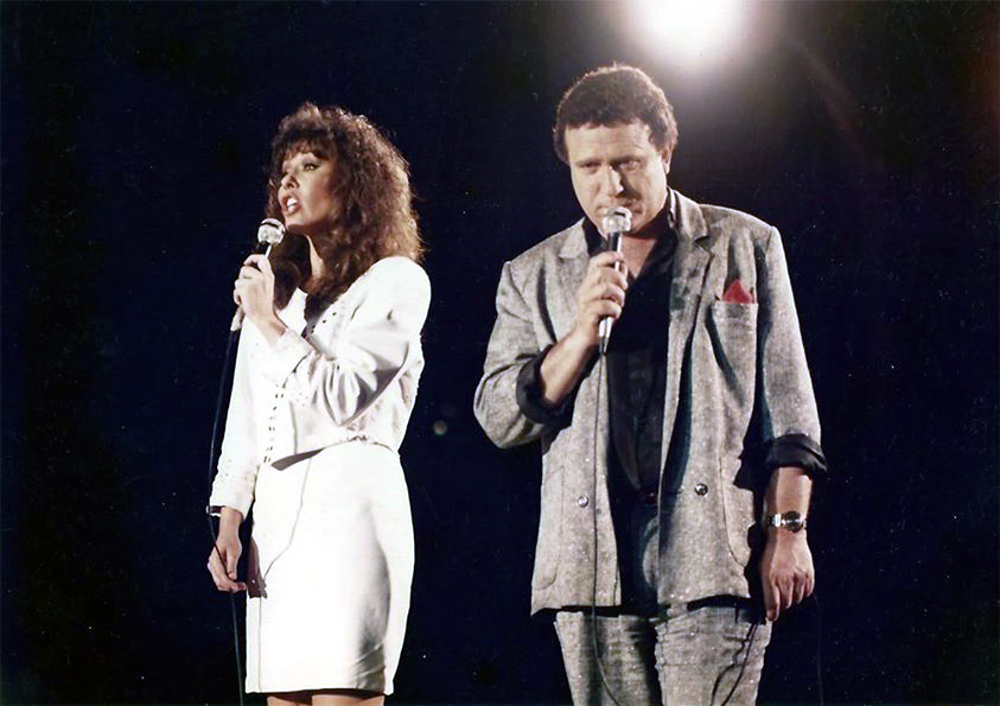
Gaon appearing with Yardena Arazi in 1988

=== Acting ===
As an actor, Gaon appeared with the Cameri Theatre of Tel Aviv in productions including Chips with Everything, Vitzek, and Kinneret Kinneret by Nathan Alterman. In the early 1960s, he studied acting at the Herbert Berghof Studio in New York City under Uta Hagen and later graduated with honors from the RCA Institute for TV Production. Upon returning to Israel, he played the lead role in the 1966 stage production of the Israeli musical Kazablan, which ran for over 600 performances and was regarded as a major cultural success. Gaon became regarded as "a figure of solidarity and pride for people of Sephardic origin, many of whom were entering a theatre for the first time". Gaon later reprised his role in the 1973 film adaptation.

In 1977, Gaon portrayed Yonatan Netanyahu in the film Operation Thunderbolt. He has appeared in other films including Siege, Every Bastard a King, The Eagles Attack at Dawn, Joker, The Lover, and No-Way Street. He also starred in the autobiographical film Ani Yerushalmi ("I Am from Jerusalem") in 1971.

Gaon has acted in several television series, including Krovim Krovim (1983-1986), the first Israeli sitcom, and Mossad 101.

=== Hosting ===
Gaon hosted the television program Shishi BeGaon ("Friday with Gaon") on Channel One and later a weekend talk show on Channel 2. Since 1997, he has hosted a weekly radio program, Gaon on the Radio (גאון ברדיו), on Kan Network Bet of the Israeli Public Broadcasting Corporation, where he discusses and comments on current events.

Gaon also served as moderator for the Israel Broadcasting Authority documentary series T’kuma, produced for Israel’s 50th anniversary in 1998. He resigned from the project, citing disagreement with what he described as "overly biased pro-Arab views" of historical events and depictions of individuals involved in attacks against Israelis in the 1970s.

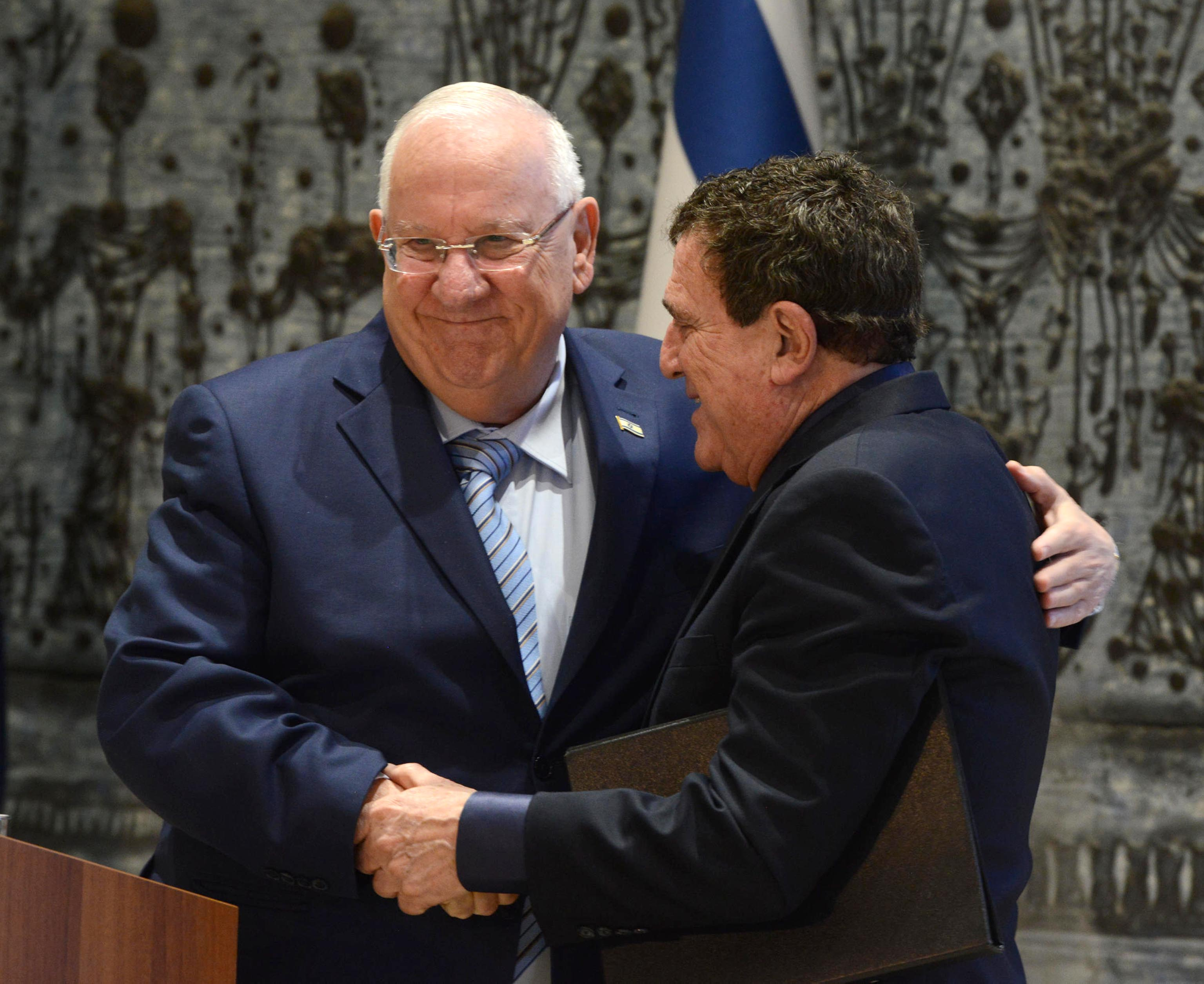
Gaon with Israeli President Reuven Rivlin in 2017. In the background is an Israeli artwork made of basalt ash.

== Political and civic career ==
In 1993, Gaon was elected to the Jerusalem Municipal Council, where he held the portfolio for Cultural Affairs and Special Education Needs, serving until 2002. He also served as a Deputy Mayor of Jerusalem.

Gaon holds the position of honorary consul of Chile in Israel and serves as president of the Arkadash Association, an organization representing Turkish immigrants to Israel. He has been active in various civic and cultural organizations, including the Committee for the Advancement of Ladino, the Yad Ben-Zvi Fund for Diaspora Research, the Adopt a Soldier Fund, the Association for Soldiers' Welfare, the Association for Autistic Children, the Fund for Music Therapy, and the Academy for the Hebrew Language.

Together with his brother Benny Gaon, he established the Moshe David Gaon Center for Ladino Studies at Ben-Gurion University of the Negev in memory of their father. In December 2010, he donated a collection of books to establish the Sarah Hakim Gaon Library for the Arkadash Association, in honor of his mother.

=== Political views ===
Gaon has stated that halting the growth of Israeli settlements is not feasible.

== Published works ==
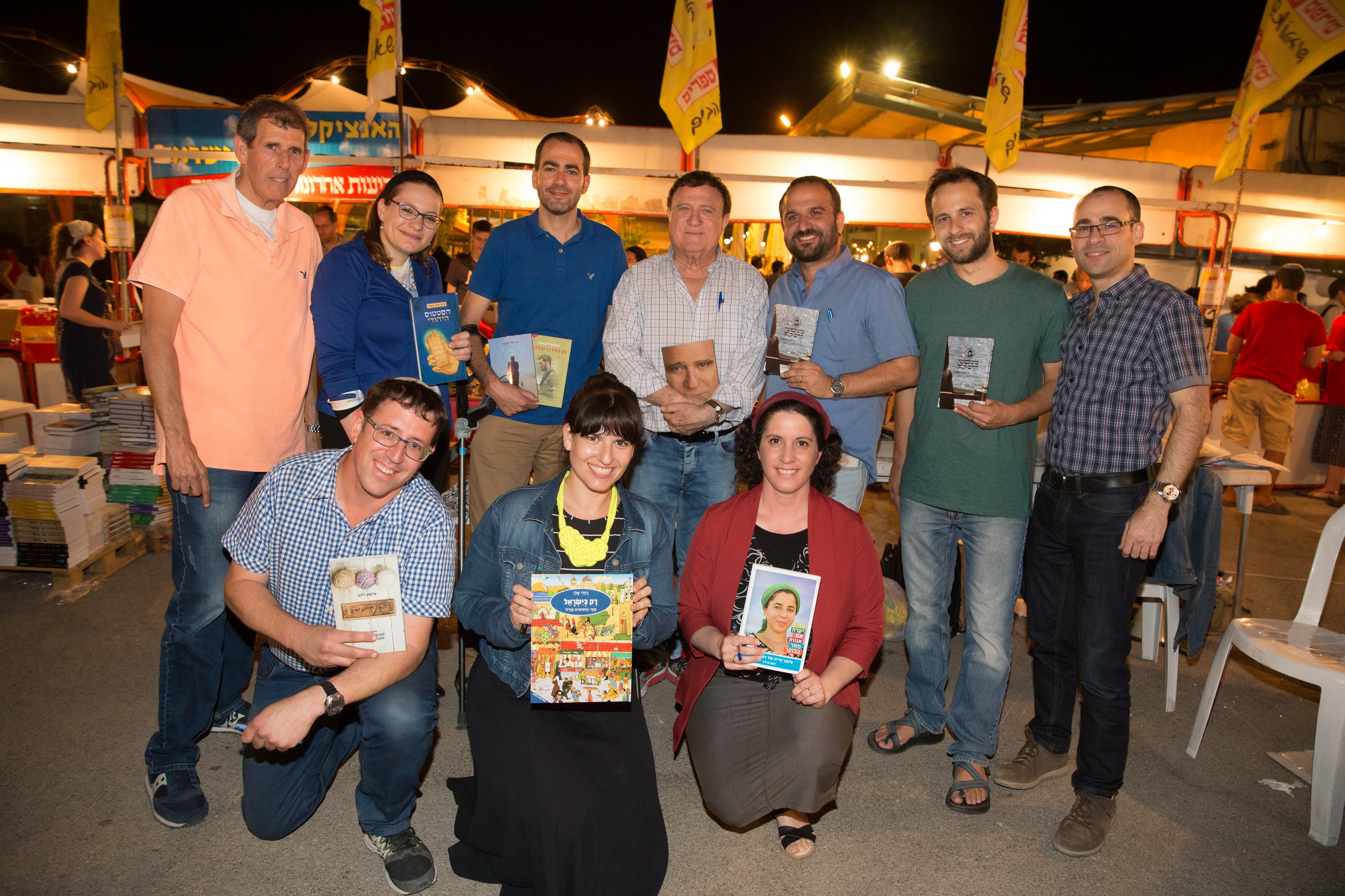
Gaon with Yedioth Books authors during the Hebrew Book Week fair at the Jerusalem Station compound, 2017 Back line: Dov Eichenwald, Sivan Rahav-Meir, Dr. Asael Lubotzky, and Gaon

In the Middle of the Road is a book by Gaon that includes poems, family stories, and photographs. He also edited Spices from Spain, a collection of Ladino proverbs and sayings with Hebrew translations that were passed down to him by his father. In addition, he oversaw the publication of a second edition of Eastern Jews in Israel, an encyclopedic work originally authored by his father, Moshe David Gaon.

Gaon also authored a Hebrew-language autobiography titled Od Ani Pose’ah – Sipur Hayai ("I'm Still Walking – The Story of My Life"), published in 2017 by Yedioth Ahronoth.

== Awards and recognition ==
In 2004, Gaon received the Israel Prize for his contribution to Hebrew music. In 2017, he was chosen to light a torch at the Israeli Independence Day ceremony. In 2020, he received with the Yakir Yerushalayim award.

== See also ==
- List of Israel Prize recipients
