= Fortuna (film) =

1967 Israeli film by Menahem Golan

- פורטונה
- Directed by: Menahem Golan
- Screenplay by: Menahem Golan
- Story by: Menahem Talmi
- Produced by: Yoram Globus; Menahem Golan; Meir Magen
- Starring: Gila Almagor; Ahuva Goren
- Cinematography: Yitzhak Herbst
- Edited by: Danny Shick
- Music by: Dov Seltzer
- Production companies: Films Festival Francais; Noah Films
- Distributed by: Tal-Shahar (video); Trans American Films (1969) (US) (dubbed)
- Release date: 1966
- Running time: 115 minutes
- Country: Israel
- Language: Hebrew

Fortuna (Hebrew: פורטונה) a.k.a. Seduced in Sodom a.k.a. The Girl from the Dead Sea) is a 1966 film directed by Menahem Golan. It was released in the United States in 1969 in a dubbed version.

== Plot ==
A man falls in love with a beautiful girl who leads him down the wrong path. He must decide what to do with life and is not sure he can continue living and contemplates suicide.

== Principal cast ==
Actor	Role
Ahuva Goren	Fortuna
Gila Almagor	Margo
Pierre Brasseur	Bozaglo
Mike Marshall	Pierre
Shmuel Oz	Yosef
Saro Urzì	Monsieur Simon

== Availability ==
Although the film is hard to find, some websites do sell the DVD online.
