= HaGashash HaHiver =

Israeli comedy trio (1964–2007)

HaGashash HaHiver הגשש החיוור
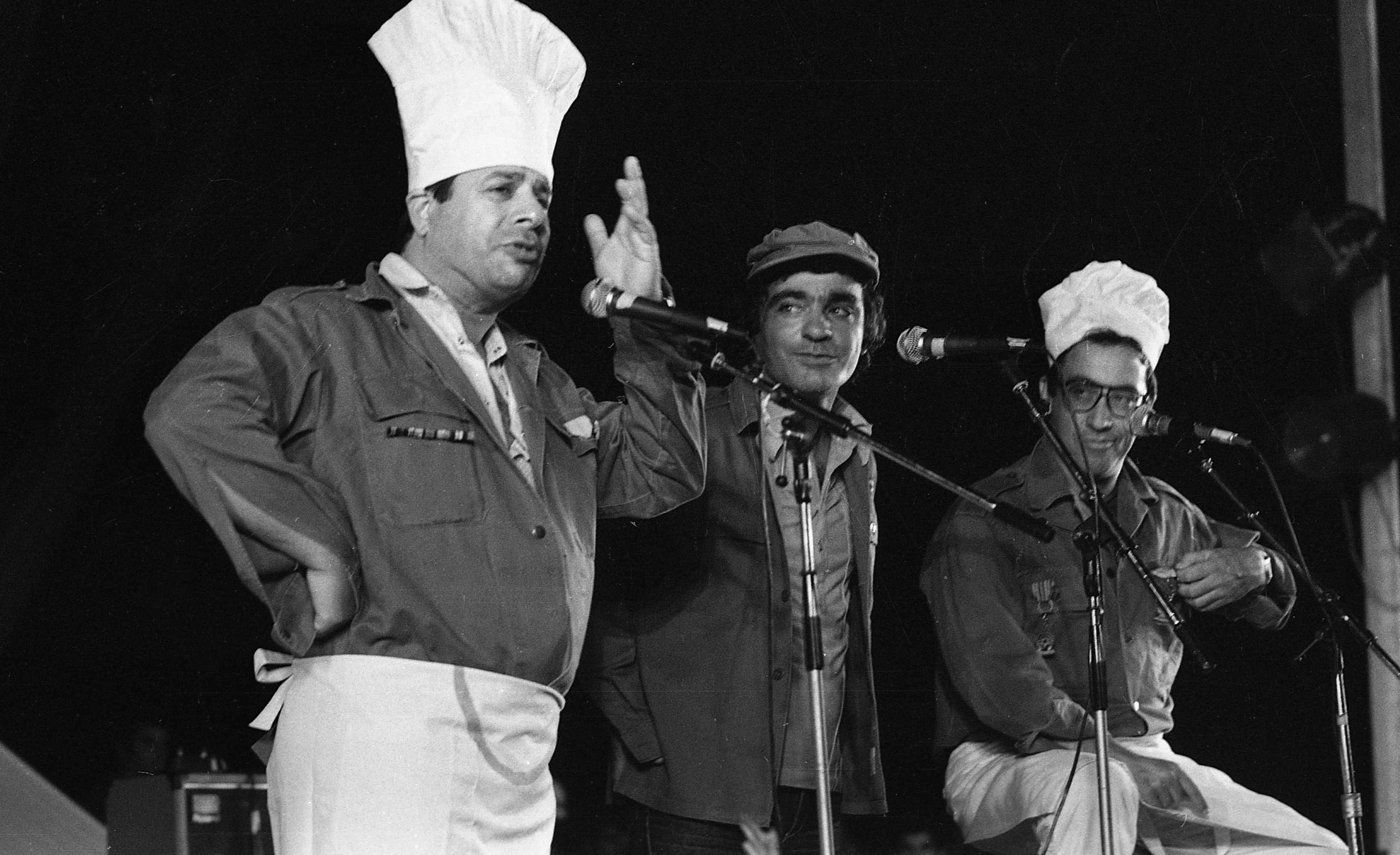
- Left to right: Shaike Levi, Gavri Banai and Yisrael "Poli" Poliakov in 1982

Background information
- Origin: Tel Aviv, Israel
- Genres: Comedy, Israeli pop.
- Years active: 1964–2007
- Spinoff of: HaTarnegolim
- Award: Israel Prize (2000)
- Past members: Yisrael Poliakov (deceased); Shaike Levi; Gavri Banai
- Company

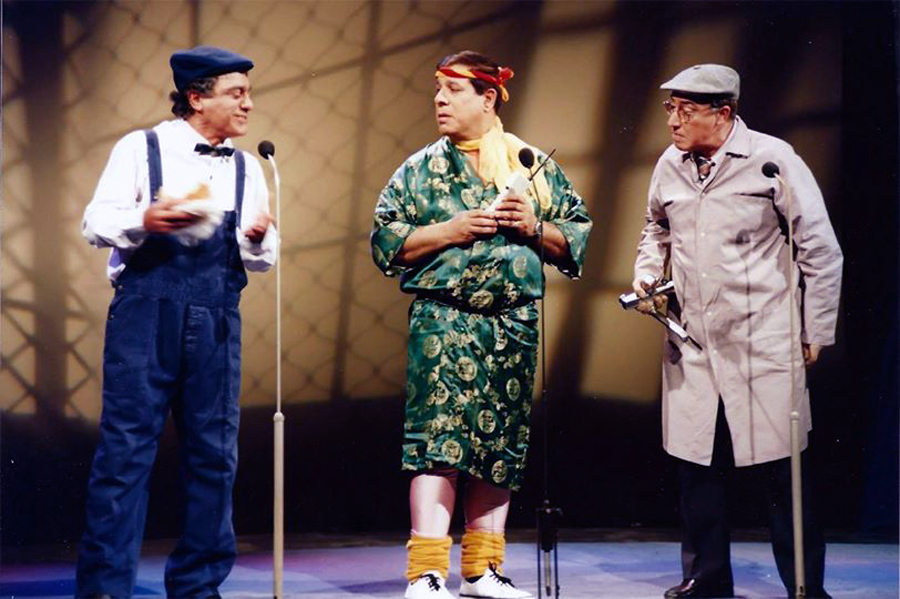
Right to left: "Poli", "Shaike" and "Gavri" in 1991

HaGashash HaHiver (Hebrew: הגשש החיוור, lit. The Pale Tracker) was an iconic Israeli comedy trio. It was also known as the Gashashim. Its three members were Yeshayahu Levi ("Shaike"), Yisrael Poliakov ("Poli") (deceased) and Gavriel "Gavri" Banai.

== History ==
Shaike, Poli, and Gavri had been members of "HaTarnegolim" ("The Roosters"), a pop group founded in 1960 by Naomi Polani.

The Gashashim put on many comedy skits which became classics in their own right ("The Drafted Car", "Off Side Story", "Kreker vs Kreker", etc.) and contributed numerous quotes to modern spoken Hebrew. They also starred in comic Israeli movies, which became major hits, such as Givat Halfon Eina Ona and recorded many famous Hebrew songs. Some of Israel's greatest authors and playwrights, including the late Nisim Aloni, prepared material for the trio. The producer of HaGashash HaHiver was Avraham Deshe ("Pachanel").

The Gashash' sketches transcended class and education. Their elaborate wordplay became known as Gashashit.

On October 29, 2007, Yisrael Poliakov died at age 66, marking the end of the trio's activities.

== Awards and recognition ==
In 2000, HaGashash HaHiver and its three members were awarded the Israel Prize for lifetime achievement & special contribution to society and the State of Israel.

The judges who awarded the prize, wrote of their decision to bestow the award on the group: "The uniqueness of Hagashash Hahiver is in its two faces: On the one hand, it reflects the life and the culture that were created in Israel during its first 50 years and in the course of wars, immigration absorption and the struggle for its existence. On the other hand, it has taken an active role in shaping this culture, creating its language and sketching its identity...Their language, Gashashit, and the images they created broke the walls of the inflexible Hebrew language and became standard idiomatic phrases, so much so that he who doesn't know them doesn't know a large part of the culture that has sprouted here. Phrases such as, 'Drive in peace, the keys are inside,' 'There was an engine?' [referring to the "Drafted Car" skit where the army returns a requisitioned car without any of its original parts], 'Israbluff' and many others that became part of our everyday language."

== Cultural significance ==
The group has been repeatedly cited as helping to form a part of the cultural self-identity of many Israelis. Israeli sociologist and scholar Baruch Kimmerling called the group "more significant for me than Shakespeare" in terms of this. "They pushed the boundary of surrealism in a language that had been dead for a couple thousand years," said Stand Up! Records founder Dan Schlissel, a fan of the group. In her book No Joke: Making Jewish Humor, Yiddish literature scholar Ruth Wisse stated that "if I ask an assortment of Israelis, 'what comes to mind when I say, Israeli humor?' almost everyone answers 'HaGashash HaHiver.'"
