= Naomi Polani =

Israeli musical and theater director (1927–2024)

- נעמי פולני
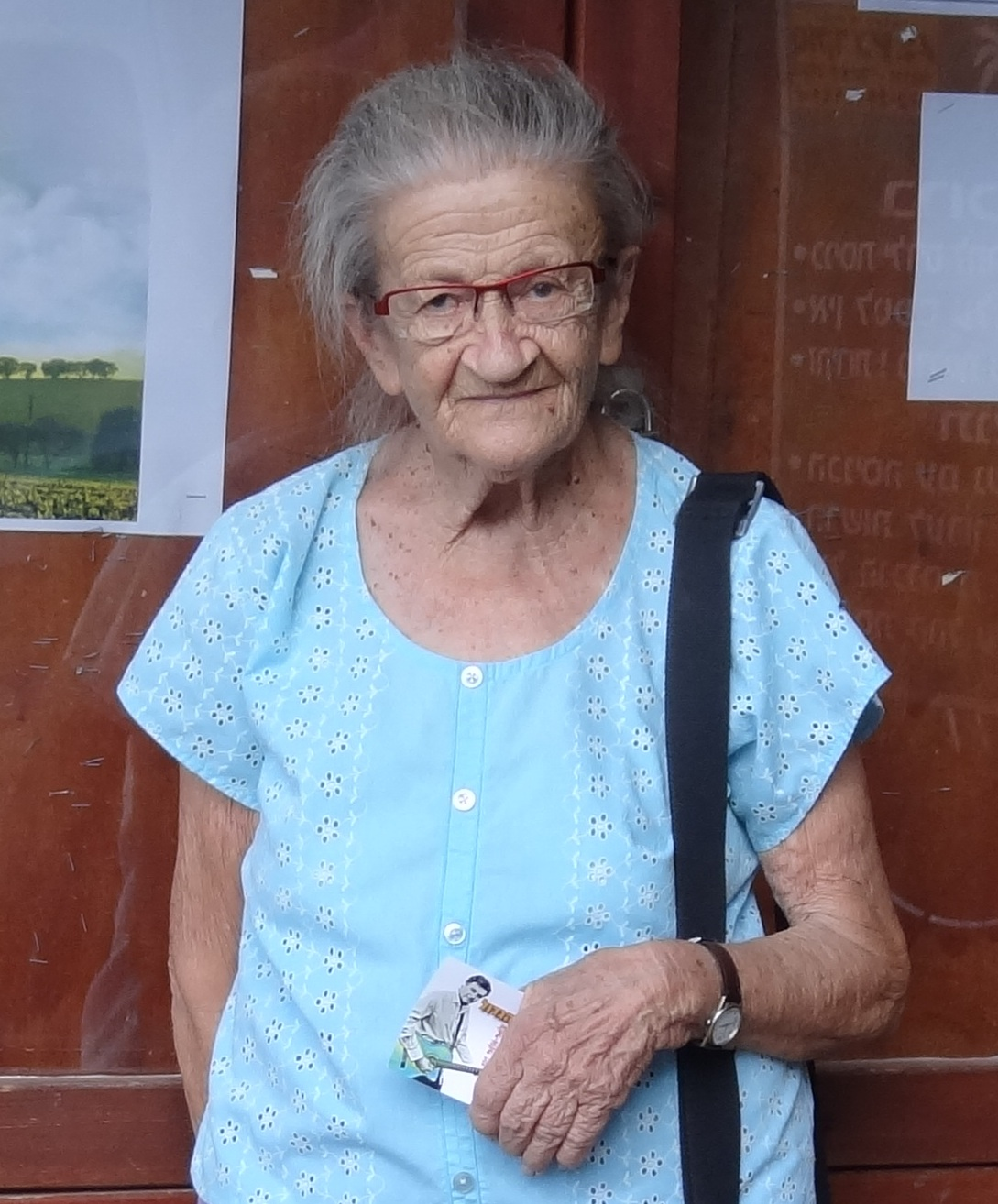
- Polani in 2011
- Born: 4 August 1927; Tel Aviv, Mandatory Palestine
- Died: 15 April 2024 (aged 96); Moshavat Kinneret, Israel
- Other name: Neomi Polani
- Occupations: Musical director, theater director; singer; producer; actress; dancer
- Known for: A director of the Israeli Military Bands in their early stages, and founded the singing group "HaTarnegolim" ("The Roosters")

Naomi Polani (Hebrew: נעמי פולני; 4 August 1927 – 15 April 2024) was an Israeli musical director, theater director, singer, producer, actress and dancer.

She is primarily known as the director of Israeli military bands in their early stages, and as the founder and director of the ensembles "HaTarnegolim" (The Roosters) and "HaHamtzitzim" (The Sorrels). She was awarded the Israel Prize in the field of Performing Arts: Theater and Dance, 2019.

== Biography ==
Polani was born in Tel Aviv, Israel, in 1927 to Yehi'el Polani (an Hebraization of Polskin) and Ada née Chissin. On her mother's side, she was the granddaughter of Dr. Chaim Chissin, one of the founders of Tel Aviv, who immigrated to Palestine from Belarus (then part of the Russian Empire) and invented the cure for malaria.

Polani studied acting at Ha'Ohel Theater, and dance with Gertrud Kraus. After graduating from Gymnasia Herzliya, at the age 18, she joined the Palmach, was a member of the mobilized training group (Hakhshara Meguyeset) in Kibbutz Hatzerim, and participated in escorting the convoys to Jerusalem.

With the outbreak of the War of Independence, she was one of the founders of the Palmach's entertainment troupe, HaChizbatron, and one of its prominent stars. Polani joined the troupe on the recommendation of Shaike Ophir, who had become acquainted with her talent at "Ha'Ohel" Theater. Her solo performance of the song "Hayu Zmanim" (There Were Times) and her duet with Ophir in the song "Hey Ha'Jeep" are particularly memorable. For a short period during the war, she also performed with the National Military Band (HaLahaka HaTzva'it HaArtzit), where she excelled in imitation acts.

After HaChizbatron was disbanded following the war, she began acting at the Cameri Theater (in the play The Queen of Sheba in 1951). Subsequently, she studied music with Herbert Brin and dance with choreographer Noa Eshkol, and in 1955, participated in Eshkol's dance quartet in the show Chamber Dance.

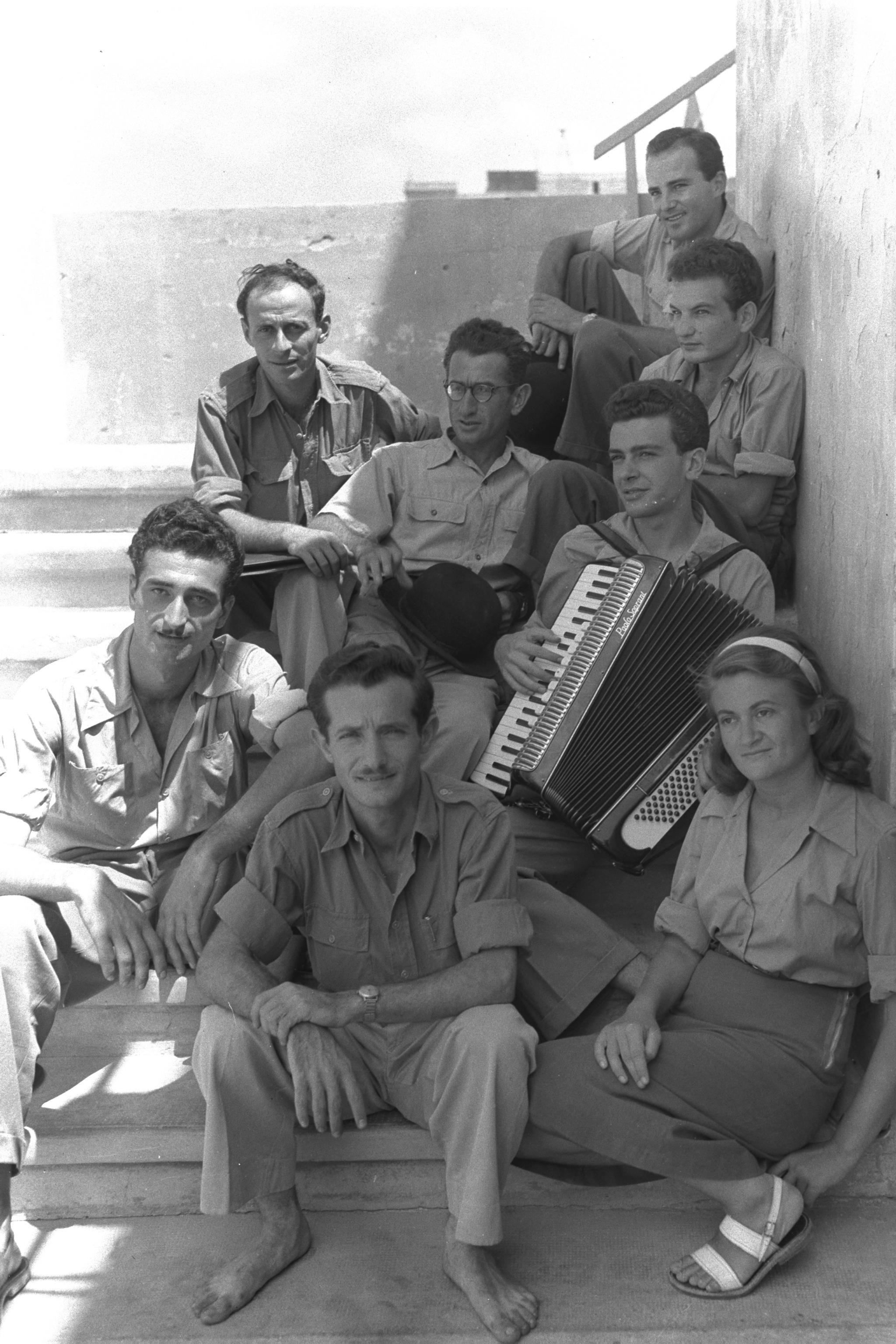
The CHIZBATRON, 1949

=== Director of military bands ===
In the 1950s, she was director of Israeli military bands, which were then in their infancy. Between 1958 and 1961, she worked with the Northern Command Band, the Armored Corps Band, and the Nahal Brigade Band. Polani was responsible for the direction, staging, and musical arrangements, basing the programs on the format of HaChizbatron's shows, which consisted of songs and skits. She also directed the singers so that their body movements would express the meaning of the song lyrics through acting and pantomime. This style of staging became the standard for the military bands for many years. Polani also contributed to advancing the musical arrangements of the bands she worked with, including fostering vocal arrangements for six voices or more and initiating the novelty of performing songs exclusively by men or exclusively by women. She also composed the song "Al Gadot HaYarkon" (On the Banks of the Yarkon) for the Armored Corps Band, based on lyrics by Haim Hefer.

=== Artistic work in civilian life ===
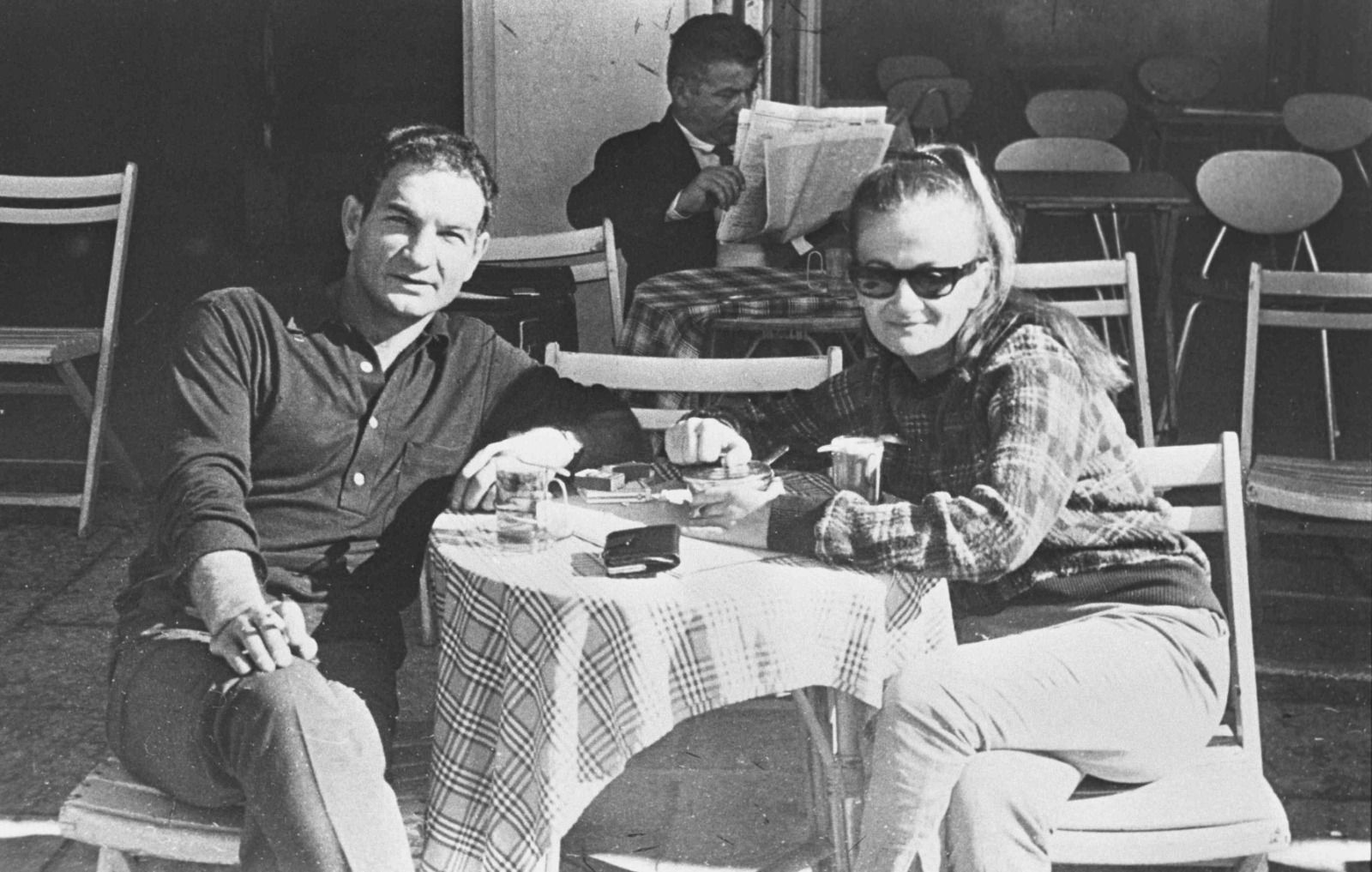
Polani and Ophir

In 1960, several demobilized members of the Nahal Band, including Yehoram Gaon, Yisrael Poliakov, Lior Yeini, and Hanan Goldblatt, asked Polani to continue working together. Polani gathered more demobilized Military Band members she had worked with and founded the ensemble "HaTarnegolim" (The Roosters). She directed the troupe in the same staging style as a military band, and the repertoire was also partly composed of military band songs and other well-known tunes. Alongside this, she sought new and original material from the best creators of the time (such as Haim Hefer, Oded Hillel, and Sasha Argov) and was involved in selecting songs, commissioning them to composers, and arranging them. HaTarnegolim disbanded in 1963 after putting on two shows.

Following the dissolution of HaTarnegolim, Polani founded the children's theater "Parpar" in 1966, which staged the play HaTayara, but it closed down shortly after. At the end of that year, Polani founded the ensemble "HaHamtzitzim" (The Sorrels), composed of four former HaTarnegolim members, but the troupe did not achieve great success and broke up after a short period. In 1968, Polani was invited to return to work with the Nahal Band to prepare a show in the style of HaTarnegolim and HaHamtzitzim. Despite her significant effort, this program was not successful and was taken down after only two performances.

Afterward, Polani served as a musical arranger for several radio programs on Kol Yisrael (including the program From the Songs of the Youth Movements, which became an album released in 1974), and taught music and directed various events in her residence area in the Jordan Valley.

In 1998, as part of the Israel Festival, she put on the show HaTarnegolim Re'union, which was a revival of HaTarnegolim's songs performed by young singers, including her son Yotam Yeini and Yaron Eldama.

In 2006, Polani starred in Oded Davidoff's film Someone to Run With, which opened the Jerusalem Film Festival.

In 2009, she acted in the play Little Eyolf by Henrik Ibsen at the Habima Theater. In 2015, she appeared in Elad Keidan's film Hill Start.

In 2017, she recorded the song "Kach Et Libi" (Take My Heart) which she composed and sang to lyrics by Haim Hefer. In the same year, she had a guest role in the series Ron, which aired on yes.

In 2020, she starred in the short film Playing Weakness by director Maayan Schwartz, which won first place at the South Cinema Festival. The judges' reasoning: "An exceptional, complete, and very moving portrait, combining fictional and documentary tools, which succeeds in telling so much thanks to the breathtaking and unique acting of the protagonist, Naomi Polani. A story about old age and vulnerability, alongside an uncompromising lust for life."

== Honors ==
Polani received the Levi Prize in Theater Arts Prize from the Tel Aviv-Yafo Municipality in 2001.

On 13 November 2007, she received the Akum Lifetime Achievement Award. She also received an honorary award from Bar-Ilan University for her contribution to Hebrew song.

In 2017, a tribute evening was held in her honor on her 90th birthday at the Ein Gev Festival.

In April 2018, she received a special honor from President Reuven Rivlin at the 70th Independence Day ceremony at the President's Residence.

In 2019, Naomi Polani was the recipient of the Israel Prize for the Hebrew year of 5779 in the field of theater and dance: "Her rich cultural work has given us dozens of dance, theater and music works. Naomi, who was one of the stars of the Palmach troupe during the War of Independence, is a true cultural warrior."

== Personal life and death ==
Polani married singer and actor Lior Yeini in 1963. The couple had two children: the actor and singer Yotam Yeini (1964), who appeared in the HaTarnegolim reunion ensemble and was an actor at the Haifa Theater, and Aya (1968), a nurse by profession. Both became Ba'alei Teshuva (returned to Orthodox Judaism) in their adulthood. The couple divorced in 1970.

Polani lived in the Moshavah Kinneret starting in 1977. In her later years, Polani lived modestly, and even spoke in interviews about her financial struggle, managing to support herself with the help of friends and acquaintances.

Polani passed away at Poriya Hospital on April 15, 2024, at the age of 96, due to complications from COPD, caused by decades of cigarette smoking. She was buried in the Kinneret Cemetery.
