= Arik Einstein discography =

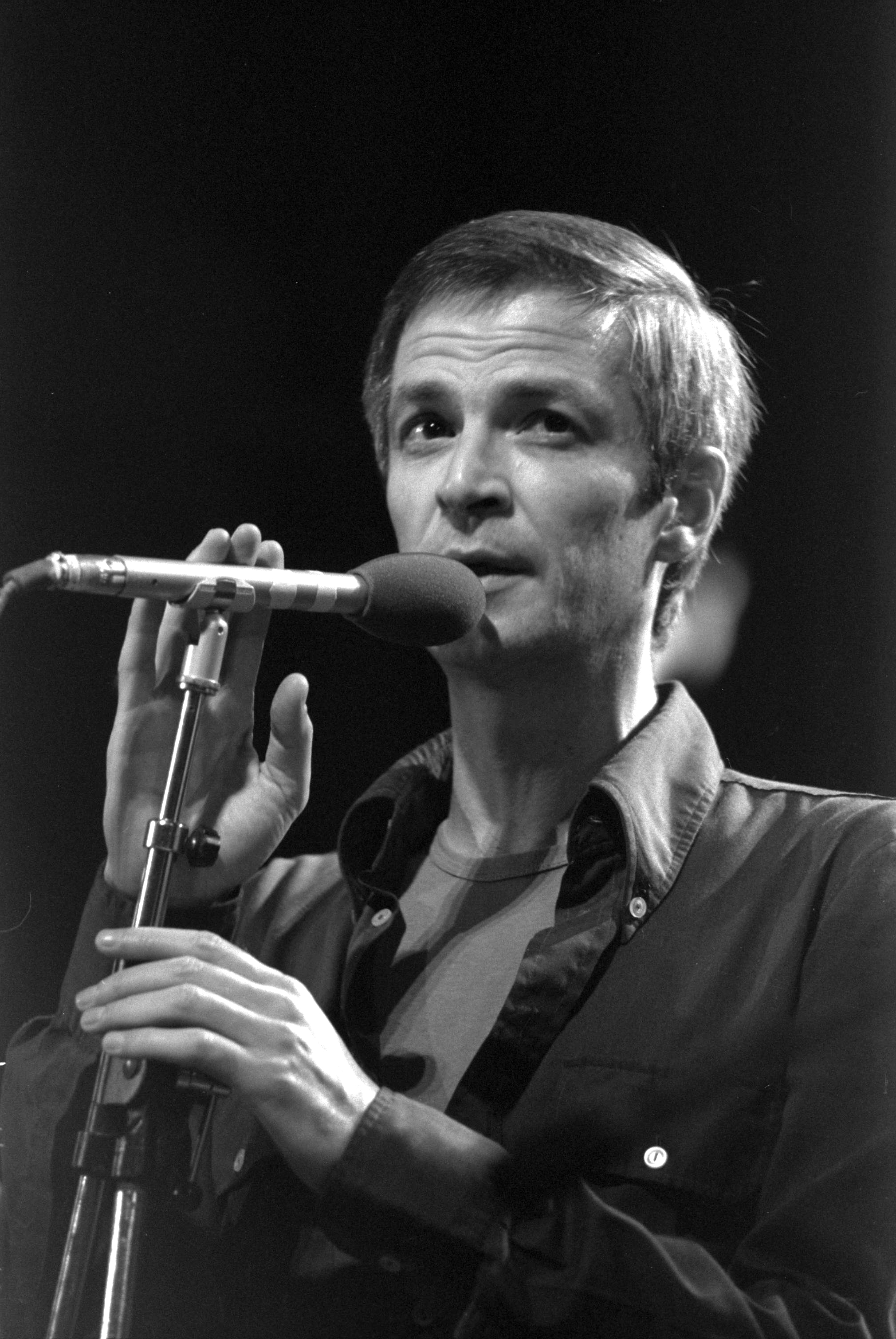
- Arik Einstein, 1979
- Studio albums: 36
- EPs: 6
- Live albums: 2
- Compilation albums: 17
- Singles: 8

In his native Israel, between 1960 and 2013, Arik Einstein released 36 studio albums (including children's music), six extended plays (EPs) and eight singles, as well as several albums with groups he was a member of, the Nahal Band, Batzal Yarok, Yarkon Bridge Trio and the High Windows. Throughout his solo career Einstein worked with several artists, often sharing credits on the album.

== Albums ==
=== Studio albums ===
Year	Album details
1966	Shar BiShvilech (Singing for You); Hebrew: שר בשבילך
1968	Mazal Gdi (Capricorn); Hebrew: מזל גדי
1969	Poozy; Hebrew: פוזי
1970	Shablul (Snail); Hebrew: שבלול: With Shalom Hanoch
1970	Plastelina (Plasticine); Hebrew: פלסטלינה: With Shalom Hanoch
1971	Shirey Yeladim (Children's Songs); Hebrew: שירי ילדים: With Robb Huxley
1971	BaDeshe Etzel Avigdor (At Avigdor's Grass); Hebrew: בדשא אצל אביגדור: With Miki Gavrielov
1972	Yasmin (Jasmine); Hebrew: יסמין
1973	Eretz Yisrael HaYeshana VeHaTova (Good Old Eretz Israel); Hebrew: ארץ ישראל ישנה והטובה
1974	Sa Le'at (Drive Slowly); Hebrew: סע לאט: With Miki Gavrielov
1975	Shirim (Songs); Hebrew: שירים
1976	Yeladim (Children); Hebrew: ילדים: With Shem Tov Levi
1976	HaAhava Panim Rabot La (Love Has Many Faces); Hebrew: האהבה פנים רבות לה: With Yoni Rechter
1976	Eretz Yisrael HaYeshana VeHaTova, Helek Bet (Good Old Eretz Israel, Part II); Hebrew: ארץ ישראל הישנה והטובה, חלק ב'): With Avner Kenner
1977	Eretz Yisrael HaYeshana VeHaTova, Helek Gimel (Good Old Eretz Israel, Part III); Hebrew: ארץ ישראל הישנה והטובה, חלק ג': With Avner Kenner
1978	Yeladud'es (Kiddos); Hebrew: ילדודס
1980	Eretz Yisrael HaYeshana VeHaTova: MeShirey Sasha Argov (Good Old Eretz Israel: Songs by Sasha Argov); Hebrew: ארץ ישראל הישנה והטובה: משירי סשה ארגוב
1980	Hamush BeMishkafa'im (Armed With Glasses); Hebrew: חמוש במשקפיים: With Miki Gavrielov
1982	Yoshev Al HaGader (Sittin' of the Fence); Hebrew: יושב על הגדר: With Itzhak Klepter
1983	Shavir (Fragile); Hebrew: שביר: With Itzhak Klepter
1984	Eretz Yisrael HaYeshana VeHaTova, Helek Hei: Nostalgia (Good Old Eretz Israel, Part V: Nostalgia); Hebrew: ארץ ישראל הישנה והטובה, חלק ה': נוסטלגיה: With Shem Tov Levi, Yoni Rechter, Itzhak Klepter and Yehudit Ravitz
1984	Pesek Zman (Time Out); Hebrew: פסק זמן: With Shem Tov Levi
1985	Totzeret HaAretz (Made in Israel); Hebrew: תוצרת הארץ: With Shem Tov Levi
1986	Ohev LiHiyot BaBa'it (A Home Loving Man); Hebrew: אוהב להיות בבית: With Miki Gavrielov
1987	Al Gvul HaOr (On the Verge of Light); Hebrew: על גבול האור: With Miki Gavrielov
1988	MiShirey Avraham Halfi (Songs by Avraham Halfi); Hebrew: משירי אברהם חלפי: With Yoni Rechter
1989	Ha'yiti Pa'am Yeled (When I Was a Kid); Hebrew: הייתי פעם ילד: With Yoni Rechter
1992	HaAryeh, HaYona VeTarnegolet Kchula (The Lion, the Dove and the Blue Hen); Hebrew: האריה, היונה ותרנגולת כחולה: With Yoni Rechter
1995	Yesh Bi Ahava (Filled With Love); Hebrew: יש בי אהבה: With Shem Tov Levi
1996	Ktzat Lakahat Hazara (A Bit of the Past); Hebrew: קצת לקחת חזרה: With Shem Tov Levi
1997	Le'an Parchu HaParparim (Where Have the Butterflies Gone); Hebrew: לאן פרחו הפרפרים: With Shem Tov Levi
1999	Muscat; Hebrew: מוסקט: With Shalom Hanoch
2002	Shemesh Retuva (Wet Sun); Hebrew: שמש רטובה
2004	Shtey Gitarot Bass Tupim (Two Guitars Bass Drums); Hebrew: שתי גיטרות בס תופים
2006	Rega'im (Moments) Hebrew: רגעים: With Peter Roth
2007	Kol HaTov SheBaOlam (All the Good in the World) Hebrew: כל הטוב שבעולם: With Guy Bocati

=== Live albums ===
Year	Album details
1977	Anashim Ohavim LaShir (People Like to Sing); Hebrew: אנשים אוהבים לשיר
1979	BeHofa'a Meshutefet (in Concert); Hebrew: בהופעה משותפת: With Shalom Hanoch

=== Compilation albums ===
Year	Album details
1968	Yashan VeGam Hadash (Old and New); Hebrew: ישן וגם חדש
1973	HaShanim HaRishonot (The First Years); Hebrew: השנים הראשונות
1978	Leket (Collection); Hebrew: לקט
1986	Mivchar (Selection); Hebrew: מבחר
1988	Leket Sheni (Second Collection); Hebrew: לקט שני
1988	Leket MeShirei Eretz Israel (Collection of Eretz Israel Songs); Hebrew: לקט משירי ארץ ישראל
1989	HaShanim HaRishonot (The First Years); Hebrew: השנים הראשונות: Collection of songs by Arik Einstein, Yehoram Gaon and band they have been in.
1993	Osef (Collection); Hebrew: אוסף
2003	HaMeytav (The Best); Hebrew: המיטב
2009	Biglalech: Osef Shirei Ahava (Because of You: A Collection of Love Songs); Hebrew: בגללך: אוסף שירי אהבה
2009	Arik Einstein - Shirei Derech (Arik Einstein – Road Songs); Hebrew: אריק איינשטיין – שירי דרך
2011	Shar Itzhak Klepter (Sings Itzhak Klepter); Hebrew: שר יצחק קלפטר
2018	VeOd Lo Amarti HaKol (And I Yet to Say It All); Hebrew: ועוד לא אמרתי הכל

=== Box sets ===
Year	Album details
2000	HaOsef (The Collection); Hebrew: האוסף
2001	Ani VeAta (Me and You); Hebrew: אני ואתה
2008	HaAlbomim HaMekori'im (The Original Albums); Hebrew: האלבומים המקוריים: Reissue of the albums "Yoshev Al HaGader", "Shavir", "Pesek Zman" and "Ohev LiHiyot BaBa'it"
2014	HaAlbomim HaMekori'im (The Original Albums); Hebrew: האלבומים המקוריים: Reissue of the albums "MeShirey Sasha Argov", "Nostalgia", "Totzeret HaAretz" and "Ktzat Lakahat Hazara".
2018	Shir SheChalamti (Song I Have Dreamt); Hebrew: שיר שחלמתי: A reissue and remastering to 15 albums released by Arik Einstein during 1969-1978.

== EPs ==
Year	Album details	Tracks
1960	HaSha'ot HaKtanot Shel HaLayla (The Small Hours of the Night); Hebrew: השעות הקטנות של הלילה	HaSha'ot HaKtanot Shel HaLayla (The Small Hours of the Night); Hebrew: השעות הקטנות של הלילה); Hi Hayta Bat Shes-Esre (She Was Sixteen); Hebrew: היא היתה בת שש-עשרה); Pundak BaMidbar (Inn in the Desert); Hebrew: פונדק במדבר); Ir Levana (White City; Hebrew: עיר לבנה)
1965	Leil Stav (Autumn Night); Hebrew: ליל סתיו: With Yafa Yarkoni	Leil Stav (Autumn Night; Hebrew: ליל סתיו); Kara Zeh Rak HaPa'am (It Happened Just This Once; Hebrew: קרה זה רק הפעם); Lu Ha'yiti (If I Were; Hebrew: לו הייתי); Rak Etmol (Just Yesterday; Hebrew: רק אתמול)
1966	Arik VeHaEinsteinim (Arik and The Einsteins); Hebrew: אריק והאיינשטיינים	Mazal (Hebrew: מזל); Rachok Rachok MiKan (Far Far Away; Hebrew: רחוק רחוק מכאן); Etz HaLimon (The Lemon Tree; Hebrew: עץ הלימון); Erev Shel Shoshanim (Evening of Roses; Hebrew: ערב של שושנים)
1967	Ani Margish Kmo Melech (I Feel Like a King); Hebrew: אני מרגיש כמו מלך	Ani Margish Kmo Melech (I Feel Like a Kingl; Hebrew: אני מרגיש כמו מלך); HaKe'ev HaZeh (This Pain; Hebrew: הכאב הזה); Lo Pa'am BaKa'yitz (Often at Summer; Hebrew: לא פעם בקיץ); Yerushalayim Shel Zahav (Jerusalem of Gold; Hebrew: ירושלים של זהב)
1967	Hagar; Hebrew: הגר	Hagar (Hebrew: הגר); Risim (Eyelashes; Hebrew: ריסים); Shabat HaMalka (Shabbat the Queen; Hebrew: שבת המלכה); Pit'om Bil'adav (Suddenly Without Him; Hebrew: פתאום בלעדיו)

== Singles ==
Title (A-side/B-side)	Release	Album
"Ha'Adon HaRofe" (Mister Doctor; Hebrew: האדון הרופא) "HaYamim Ha'Arukim Ha'Atzuvim" (The Long Sad Days; Hebrew: הימים הארוכים העצובים)	1967	Mazal Gdi
"Ob-La-Di, Ob-La-Da" (Hebrew: או-בלה-די או-בלה-דה) "Beit HaArava" (Hebrew: בית הערבה)	1968	–
"Prague" (Hebrew: פראג) "Mi SheChalam" (He Who Dreamt; Hebrew: מי שחלם)	1969	Poozy
"Achinoam Lo Yoda'at" (Achinoam Doesn't Know; Hebrew: אחינועם לא יודעת) "Haya Lanu Tov, Nihiya Lanu Ra" (We Had It Good, It Got BadHebrew: היה לנו טוב, נהיה לנו רע)	1969	Poozy
"Oh Me" "An Old Fashioned Silly Song"	1970	–
"Ma Ata Oseh KsheAta Kam BaBoker" (What Do You Do When You Get Up in the Morning; Hebrew: מה אתה עושה כשאתה קם בבוקר) "Kach Lecha Isha" (Take Yourself a Wife; Hebrew: קח לך אישה)	1970	Shablul
"Ani Ohev Lishon" (I Love to Sleep; Hebrew: אני אוהב לישון) "Ani Ve'Ata" (Me and You; Hebrew: אני ואתה)	1970	BaDeshe Etzel Avigdor
"Atur Mitzchech Zahav Shachor" (Your Forehead is Gold Black; Hebrew: עטור מצחך זהב שחור)	1977	Eretz Yisrael HaYeshana VeHaTova, Helek Gimel

== Other appearances ==
=== Soundtracks ===
Year	Song(s)	Album	Notes	Ref.
1962	"HaMac HaMitparek" (Wreck of a Mec), "BeTa HaKeleh" (From a Prison Cell)	Irma La Douce	1962 theatrical production. Einstein played the part of Nestor le Fripé.	
1964	"Li VeLach" (For Me and You) (with Geula Nuni)	Sallah Shabati		
1971	"Leo HaTov" (Good Leo), "Lo Al HaChetzi Levado" (Not on the Half Alone)	Fifty-Fifty (1971 film)		
1978	"Susetz"	Rocking Horse		

=== Various artist compilation albums ===
Year	Song(s)	Album	Notes	Ref.
1965	"Ayelet HaChen"	1965 Israel Song Festival	The song was performed in the festival by both Einstein and Yafa Yarkoni	
1966	"Yatzanu At" (We Went Out Slowly), "Ruti", "Shoshana"	Ach, Pgisha SheKazot (Such a Meeting)	Collection of Palmach songs	
1998	"Yeled Mizdaken"	Avoda Ivrit		

=== Guest appearances ===
Year	Album	Artist	Details	Ref.
1972	Aharit HaYamim (Apocalypse)	Aharit HaYamim	Back vocals on "Yom Huledet"	
1995	Machsavot VeEfsharuyot (Thoughts and Possibilities)	Yoni Rechter	Vocals on "Dai Im HaBulshit"	
2000	Yoman Masa (Travelogue)	Aviv Geffen	Vocals on "Yoman Masa"	
2012	Osher Express (Happiness Express)	Shlomo Artzi	Duet vocals on "Hozrim HaBayta"	

=== Other ===
The 1992 Israeli parody film Cables was scripted by Arik Einstein, Moni Moshonov, and Zvi Shissel. It includes five songs of Arik Einstein and Einstein himself plays a role of a gangster. It is a collection of sketches, with the frame story being a guy flipping cable TV channels.

== See also ==
- Batzal Yarok
- Yarkon Bridge Trio
- The High Windows
