= Israeli rock =

Type of rock music

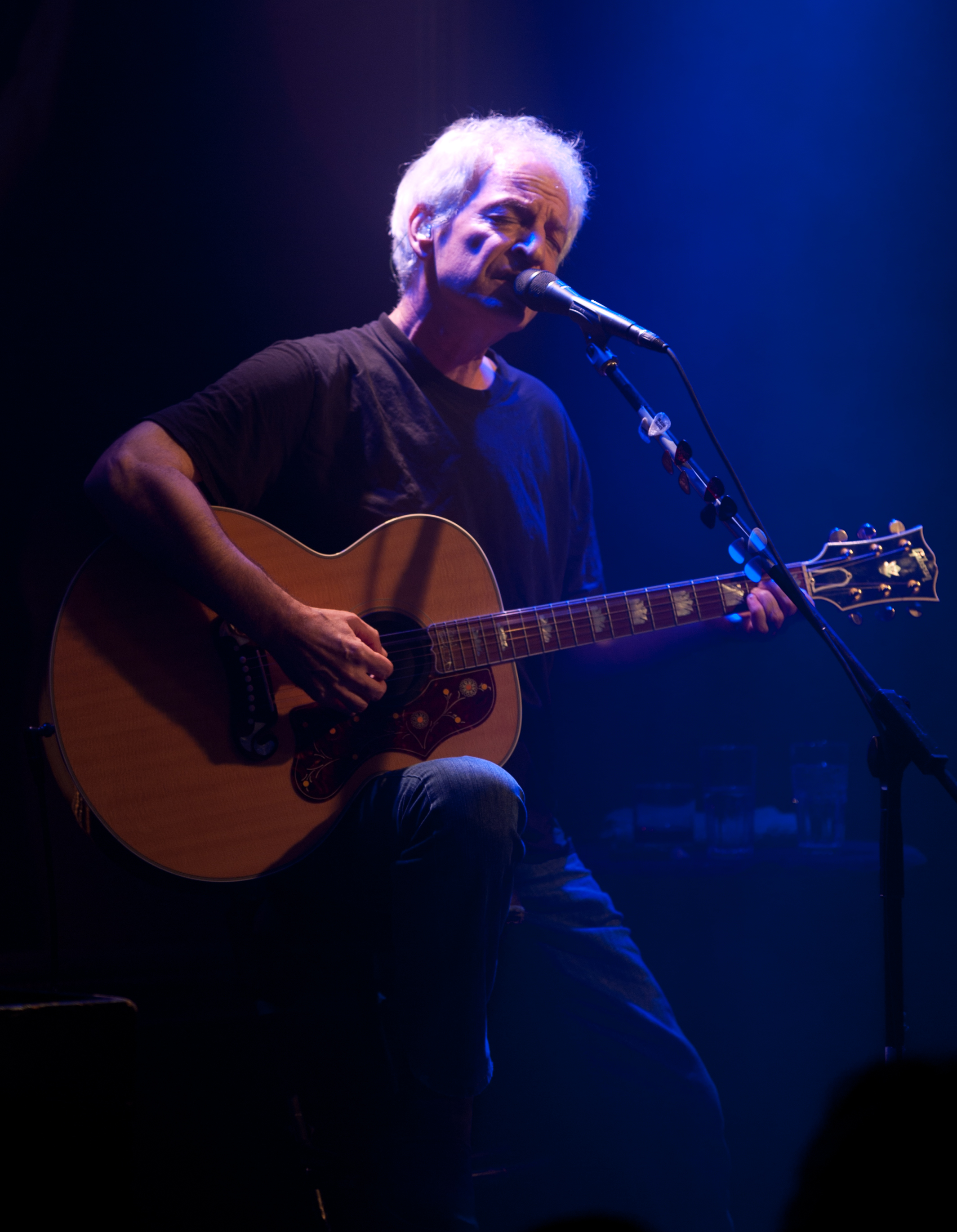
- Shalom Hanoch, often considered the father of the Israeli rock genre.
- Native name: רוק ישראלי
- Stylistic origins: Rock and Roll; Psychedelic rock; Hard rock; Rhythm & Blues
- Cultural origins: Mid 1960s-Early 1970s, Israel.
- Typical instruments: Drums; vocals; electric guitar

Israeli rock (Hebrew: רוק ישראלי, Rok Yisra'eli) is rock music created by Israeli bands and singers.

== History ==
=== 1960s ===
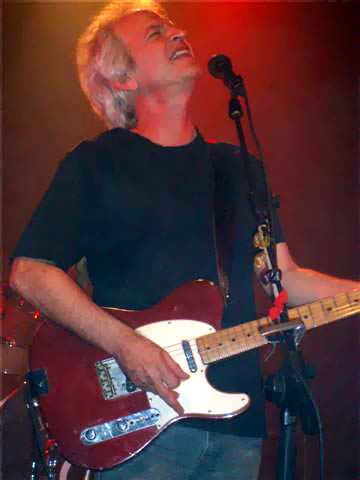
Rock singer Shalom Hanoch

Israel's initial attitude towards rock music was mixed, with the genre gaining popularity amongst the youth but receiving condemnation from the press and government, most notably in 1965 when the minister of education Hanoch Rinot prevented the funding for a possible concert in Ramat Gan by The Beatles, labeling their music as holding "no artistic value". Israeli musicians of the time believed that it was a fad that would soon pass. The first Israeli rock bands began performing in the mid-1960s in nightclubs and discos, first in Ramla and later on HaMasger Street in Tel Aviv. These bands mainly performed cover versions of popular rock songs by bands like The Beatles and The Shadows. Rock culture, in the social and political sense, was nowhere in sight. Bands that stood out in the first wave of Israeli rock were Yarkon Bridge Trio, The Churchills, The High Windows, The Lions (aka The Lions of Juda), The Styles (aka Uzi and the Styles), The Fat and the Thins, The Blue Stars, The Goldstars, The New Stars, The Generals, The Monks, The Spiders, The Electric Stage, The Seventh Radiance, and The Sing-Sing.

In the euphoria that followed the Six-Day War, the performing groups of the Israel Defense Forces rose in status with a steady stream of songs about victory, bereavement and loss. Rock became part of the alternative music scene that was played mostly in clubs such as "Hakarish" and "Calypso", formerly known as drug dens.

Near the end of the decade rock and roll gained legitimacy. Western musicians arrived in Israel, and influences of the pop revolution permeated local culture. Some of the local bands added English musicians to their ensemble, creating several new bands that were based on the original rhythm bands. In the second wave of rhythm bands, three main bands led the local rock scene. The first was The Churchills, which consisted of five musicians including Canadian singer Stan Solomon, and British guitarist Robb Huxley. These were the most creative of the Israeli rock bands; they played innovative combinations of psychedelic rock mixed with Mediterranean Arab music. In 1970 the Israeli composer Noam Sheriff initiated a concert played by the Israel Philharmonic Orchestra and The Churchills, and their shared work with Arik Einstein, Oshik Levi and other artists from the mainstream Israeli pop music scene granted the Israeli rock scene a public stamp of approval. The second band, The Lions, was considered to be the first Israeli band to experiment with reggae music.

The third prominent Israeli band of those years was the supergroup Uzi and the Styles, created by the former lead singer of The Fat and the Thins, Uzi Fox. The band's varied style was derived from British pop and American soul music and was characterized by the compound-rich processings of wind instruments that resembled Blood, Sweat & Tears, Chicago, etc.

By 1969, Arik Einstein had taken The Churchills under his wing as a backup band, and with their help he would record the groundbreaking album "Poozy", which is often considered the mainstream breakthrough of the genre. The followup to the album would be the first of several fruitful collaborations with Shalom Hanoch with "Snail" and "Plastilna" both in 1970.

=== 1970s ===
In the early 1970s, Israel had a burgeoning progressive rock scene. One of the first performers was Shlomo Gronich, whose 1971 debut was Why Didn't You Tell Me?. Danny Ben Israel's Bullshit 3 1/4 was released in 1970, but overlooked for some thirty years. Other 70s prog bands included The Churchills, Zingale, and Sheshet.

Many bands formed in this decade. The rock band Tamouz gained much success in the 1970s. The most successful Israeli Rock band of the seventies was Kaveret which combined rock music and a unique sense of humor. Another successful artist was Gabi Shoshan, a Moroccan-born Israeli singer and actor. Shoshan’s greatest hits included “Shesh Esre Malou La’Naar” (The Boy Is 16) and “Bereshit” (The Beginning), among many others. Shoshan was part of an era of Israeli music called "Flower Power". The (consecutive 1st prize) winners of the 1976, 1977, and 1978 Chassidic Song Festival was the band that invented Jewish Rock, The Diaspora Yeshiva Band, who made several albums, had many hits (Hafachta, Malchutcha, Ivdu), and toured worldwide including Carnegie Hall and Lincoln Center. At the end of the decade, singers who wrote and performed rock oriented music became very popular and very successful, including Shalom Hanoch (who previously collaborated with Arik Einstein), Ariel Zilber (formerly of Tamuz), Svika Pick (in combination with pop music and disco music), Efraim Shamir, Yitzhak Klepter (formerly of Kaveret and the Churchills) and Gary Eckstein.

=== 1980s ===
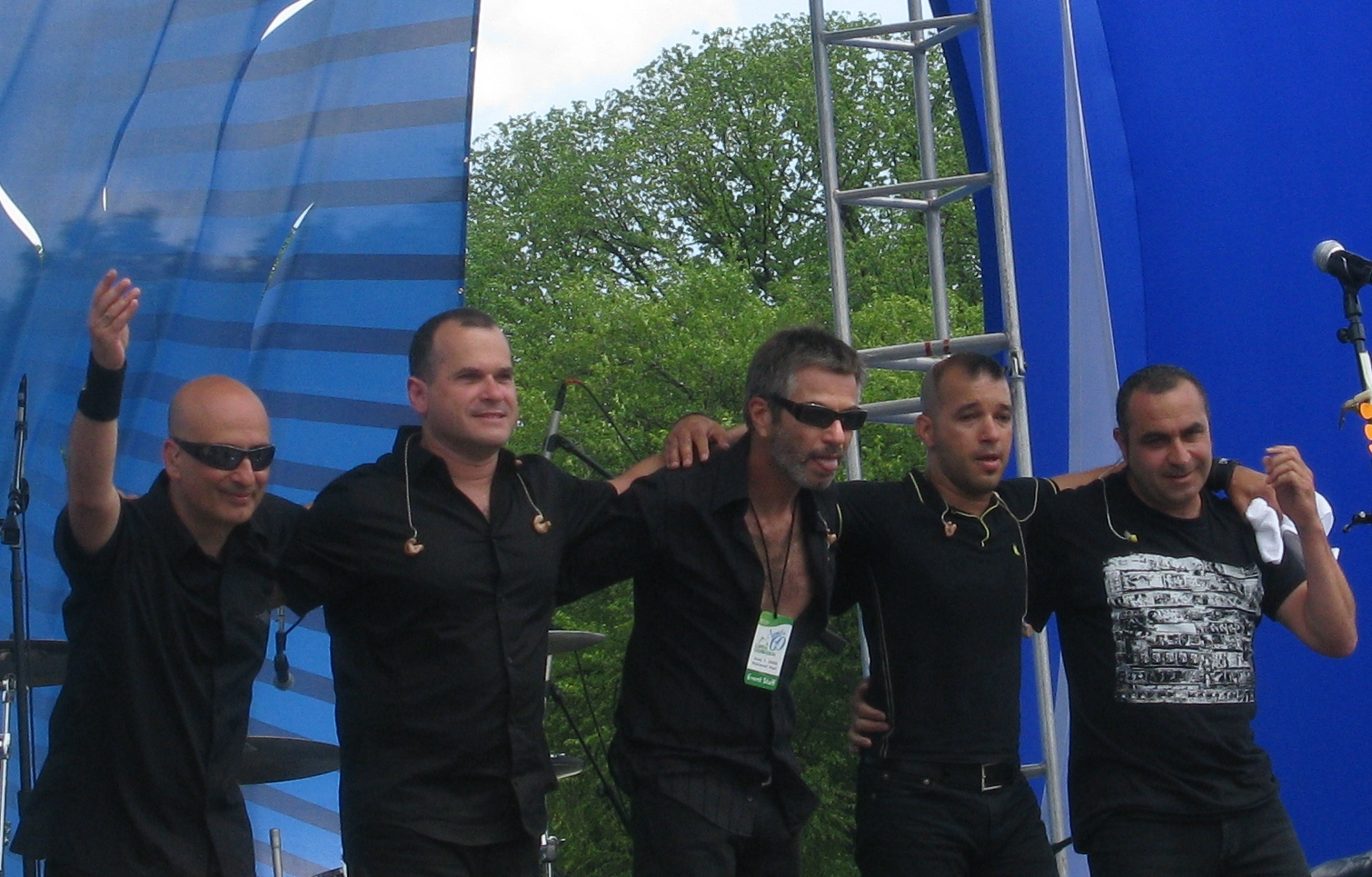
Mashina

During the 1980s a few rock bands became popular. Notable rock bands of the decade were The Click, Benzin, T-Slam, and Mashina which became the most successful Israeli rock band of the decade.

=== 1990s ===
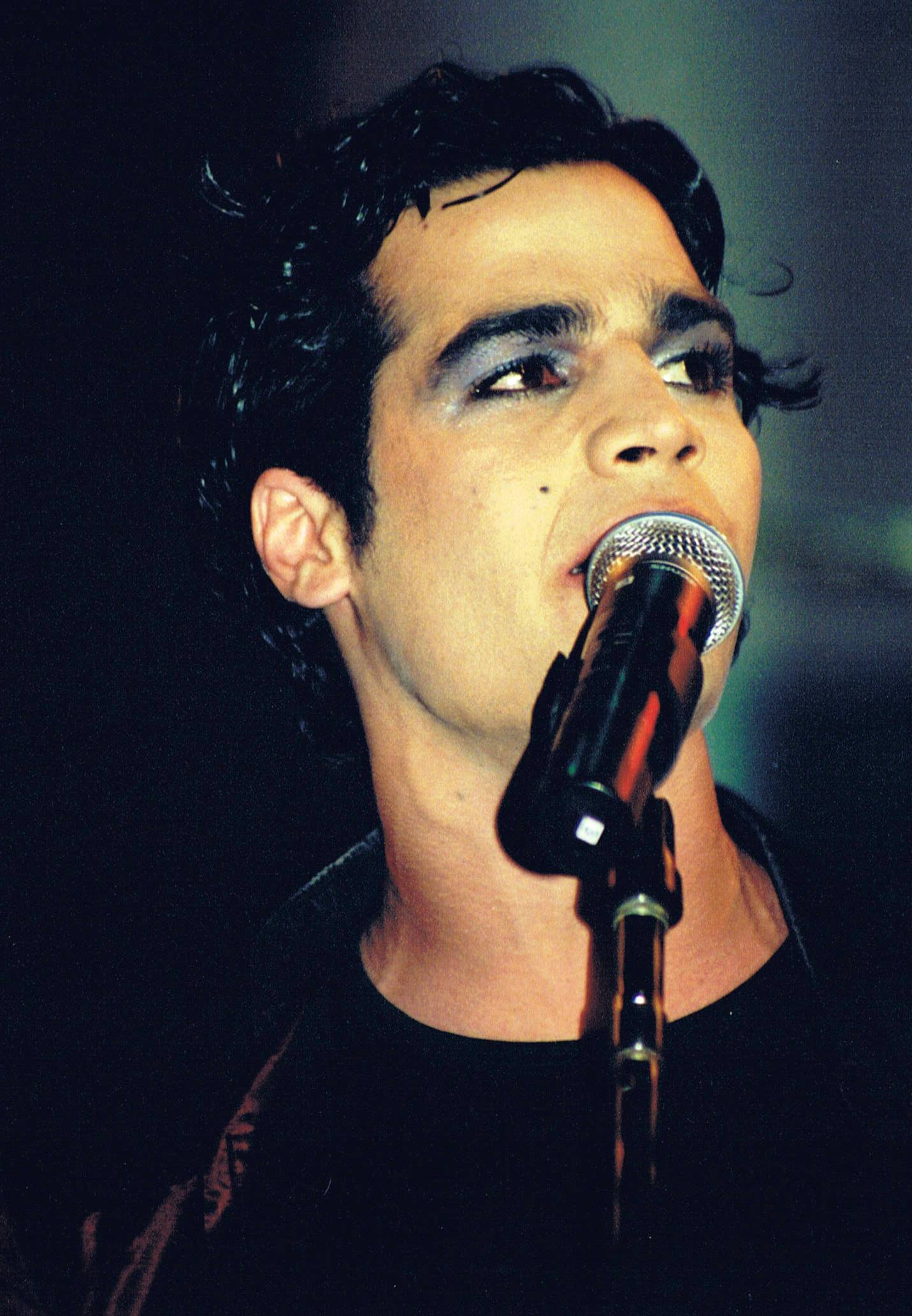
Aviv Geffen

In the 1990s, a new wave of young rock bands and singers started. The entrance of some artists and bands that were formed in the 80s, like the famous duo of Rami Fortis and Berry Sakharof, Mashina, Korin Allal, Meir Banai and others into the Israeli mainstream, inspired many young rock artists such as Aviv Geffen, Inbal Perlmuter, Yermi Kaplan, Assaf Amdursky, and others, and just in the years of 1990-1994 an uncountable number of young rock bands were formed. Bands such as Eifo HaYeled, Monica Sex, HaYehudim, The Elders of Zfat, Rockfour, The Friends of Natasha, Dr. Kasper's Rabbits Show, HaMehashefot (The Witches), Tractor’s Revenge, Nosei Hamigbaat, Cermella Gross & Wagner, Knesiyat Hasechel, Ra’ash, Taarovet Eskot, Avtipus, and Noar Shulaim, were just the most noticeable bands of this period. An essential role in the rise of these bands and artists was the former Roxanne club in Tel Aviv, which hosted known artists and emerging artists of rock and alternative rock, exposing new bands to a growing audience. Since then, most of those bands have disbanded, but their members still continue to act in various music projects and mostly constitute the community of the Israeli music of the 2010s.

Notable in the field of Glam metal and Heavy metal was the band "Stella Maris" from Haifa, which began performing in the early 1990s. Stella Maris later integrated in the mainstream Israeli music scene and its vocalist, Pavlo Rosenberg, launched a solo career of his own.

Israel also developed a new style of rock/metal named Oriental metal, a crossover between death metal and doom metal, influenced by ancient Jewish traditions and the oriental culture both in lyrics and melody.

Two mid-1990s crises led to the decline of that early 1990s rock boom: First was the Arad festival disaster of July 1995, after which the popularity of these events declined. Then the nationally traumatic murder of Prime Minister Yitzhak Rabin in November that year, is largely considered to have shifted the whole cultural atmosphere of the country, and the prominence and success of the "kicking" rock of the early 1990s was replaced by more mellow directions. Yet, until the end of that decade, Israeli rock music kept its place as a central musical style, and important bands such as Hamachshefot and Monica Sex formed.

=== 2000s ===
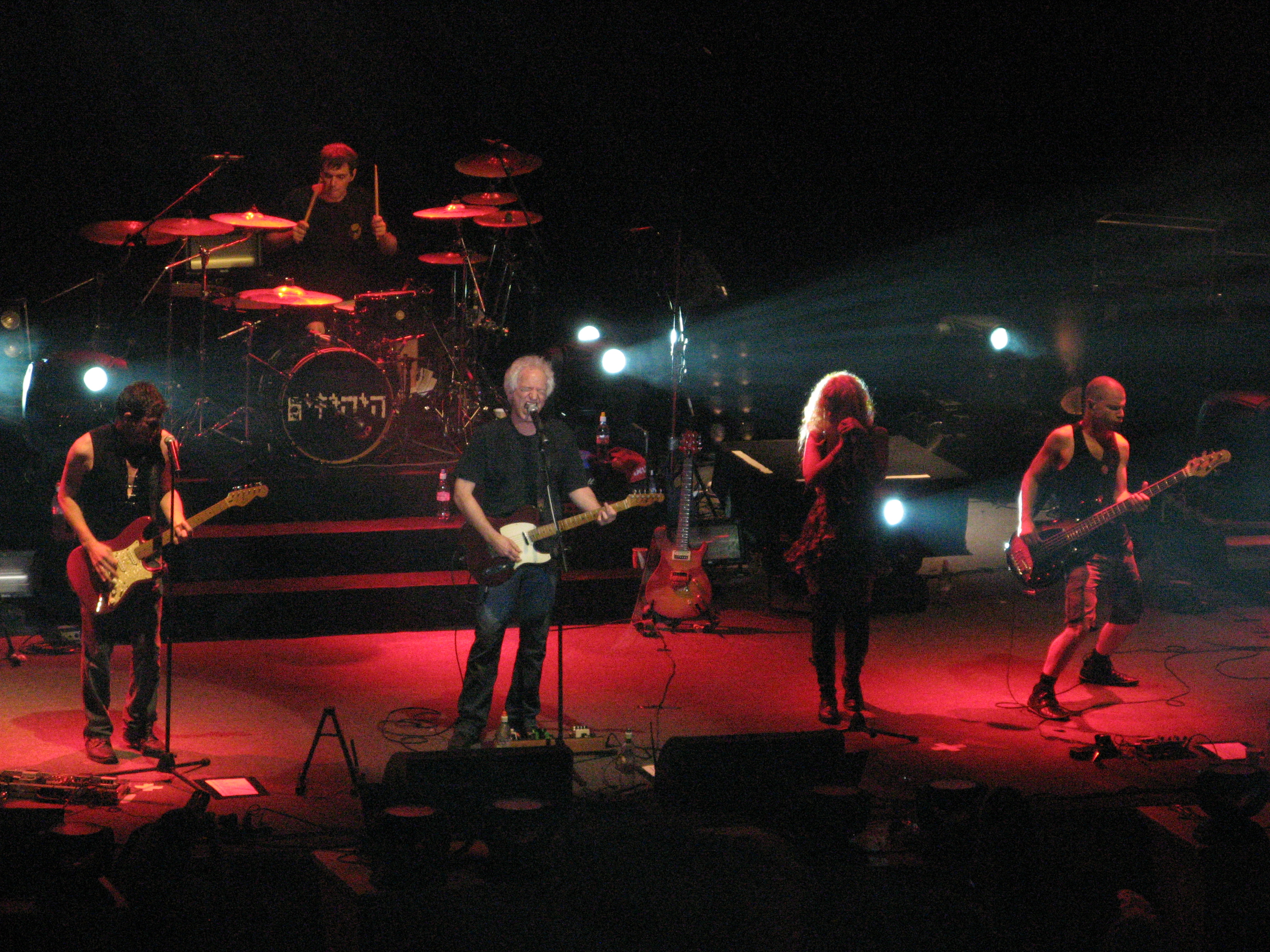
HaYehudim in concert with Shalom Hanoch, 2010

Although Israeli rock became less popular in the 2000s, being edged out by Israeli pop, many new rock artists and bands emerged. Among the most prominent Israel rock bands of the 2000s are Beit HaBubot, playing melodic rock which focused on acoustic guitar, and Synergia, which had a melodic nu metal sound. Among the other successful emerging Israeli rock bands and artists of this decade were Girafot, Sheygets, Habiluim, Yoni Bloch, Hadag Nahash, Shy Nobleman, Vaadat Charigim and many more.

Many disbanded Israel rock bands began playing again during this decade, including T-Slam, Mofa Ha'arnavot Shel Dr. Kasper, Mercedes Band, Eifo HaYeled, Monica Sex, Mashina, etc.

At the end of the 2000s Mizrahi music gained massive popularity in Israel, further weakening the popularity of Israeli rock.

=== 2000-2010 ===
In the second decade of the 2000s, the creators of the classic rock style dwindled and songs that combine rock with pop and oriental music appeared. Prominent creators in this field are Dudu Tassa, who succeeds in combining the Iraqi folk music he grew up with at home with the alternative rock of the 90s, Keren Peles, who combines personal and exposed writing with rock arrangements alongside moving ballads, Hanan Ben Ari who broke out in this decade with rock songs of faith.

Also, the well-known rock artists continued to create - Aviv Gefen, with the albums "Psifas" (2012) and "Sdakim" (2014), Mosh Ben Ari with the albums "Tistakel li Ba'enayim" (2011) and "As in Life". Avitar Banai released two successful albums in this decade - "Yafa Kalevana" and "Leshonot Shel Esh", which were played a lot on the radio stations, and also had a successful collaboration together with Aviv Gefen in a joint show.

== See also ==
- List of Israeli rock singers
- List of Israeli rock music groups
- Rock Mizrahi
- Music of Israel
- List of Israeli musical artists
