= Poozy =

Studio album by Arik Einstein
- Released: 24 June 1969
- Studio: Kolinor Studios
- Genre: Israeli rock
- Length: 43:00
- Language: Hebrew
- Label: Phonokol
- Producer: Misha Segal

Arik Einstein chronology
Capricorn (1968)	Poozy (1969)	Shablool (1970)

Poozy (Hebrew: פוזי) is the third solo studio album by Israeli singer Arik Einstein, released on 24 June 1969 on Phonokol. It is often considered to be the first Israeli rock album or one of the first, after The High Windows. It has also been ranked in publication listings of the greatest Israeli albums of all time.

After the release, a legal dispute between Einstein and CBS Israel Records over whether Einstein violated his contractual obligations, but the case was dropped.

== Background and songs ==
Arik Einstein recruited composer Misha Segal to help with composing songs for Poozy, and not long afterwards, he recruited the Churchills as the main backing band for the album.

There are a total of 11 songs on Poozy, each with its own specific musical style and genre. Of these 11 songs, 8 were written by Yehonatan Geffen, a newcomer in the Israeli music industry at the time, and Einstein himself, while the remaining 3 were written by Shalom Hanoch, children's author Miriam Yalan-Shteklis, and Yiddish poet Itzik Manger.

"Achinoam Doesn't Know" was a Hebrew-language adaptation of the Churchills' song When You're Gone by Robb Huxley, with the song's original composition being softened per Einstein's request. The Hebrew lyrics were provided by Yehonatan Geffen, and the title came about from Geffen's own difficulties when writing the lyrics.

"You're Not Pretty when You Cry" was composed by Shmulik Kraus specifically for the album, and its lyrics were written quickly by Geffen due to Kraus' oversight of his writing process.

"Prague" was written and composed by Shalom Hanoch and was inspired by the 1968 Soviet invasion of Czechoslovakia. It debuted in the 1969 Israel Song Festival, where it was received poorly and finished in 7th place due to its subject matter.

"We had Good Times, we had Bad Times" is a Hebrew language adaptation of the Beatles' song The Ballad of John and Yoko, with lyrics by Einstein himself.

"Dwarves Scuttled & Ran" was one of Kraus' first musical adaptations of children's author Miriam Yalan-Shteklis's poems, having been composed back in 1961.

"So Warm" featured a bassline inspired by Paul McCartney's basslines on songs such as A Day in the Life and Hey Jude.

"Girl Drawing" featured an opening influenced by Simon & Garfunkel's 1968 song Mrs. Robinson.

"Abraham and Sarah" was the first song that Einstein requested for Misha to compose for the album. Originally, a Yiddish poem written for a musical by Itzik Manger, Misha composed it to the beat of the Beatles' 1968 song Ob-La-Di, Ob-La-Da, per Einstein's own request.

"Once upon a time" was changed during the recording of the album to be a tribute to the then recently deceased pianist Ziggy Skrabnic, who had died in 1967 due to cancer. It is a near 8 minute long psychedelic rock song about a fantasy kingdom, wherein the king is Ziggy.

The tile "Poozy" is the nickname of Arik's first wife, Alona Einstein. Einstein's daughter, Shiri, appears in the photograph on the album cover sitting on her father's lap.

== Reception and legacy ==
Poozy released on 24 June 1969 on Phonokol. It received critical acclaim from critics, who praised its musical direction and songs. In particular, critics praised the last two songs on the album for broadening Einstein's musical depth. After its release, a legal dispute emerged between CBS Israel Records and Einstein over alleged violation of contractual obligations. During the lawsuit, CBS filed a cease-and-desist to prevent the release of Poozy, but it was cancelled after the case was dropped.

Poozy is considered to be the first Israeli rock album and has been called the Israeli equivalent of The White Album. It has also been ranked in publication listings of the greatest Israeli albums of all time.

== Track listing ==
Side one
No.	Title	Lyrics	Music	Length
1.	"Achinoam Doesn't Know"	Yehonatan Geffen	Robb Huxley	3:22
2.	"You're Not Pretty when You Cry"	Yehonatan Geffen	Shmulik Kraus	3:26
3.	"Prague"	Shalom Hanoch	Shalom Hanoch	5:07
4.	"We had good times, we had bad times." (Hebrew language adaptation of The Ballad of John and Yoko)	Arik Einstein	Lennon-McCartney	2:40
5.	"Dwarves Scuttled & Ran"	Miriam Yalan-Shteklis	Shmulik Kraus	2:52
6.	"Eretz Israel"	Arik Einstein	Shmulik Kraus	3:58
Total length:				21:25

All music is composed by Misha Segal.

Side two
No.	Title	Lyrics	Length
1.	"So Warm"	Arik Einstein	3:43
2.	"Love Life Of Aliza The Dog"	Yehonatan Geffen	3:16
3.	"Girl Drawing"	Yehonatan Geffen	3:04
4.	"Abraham and Sarah" (Translated by Benjamin Tene)	Itzik Manger	3:47
5.	"Once Upon a Time (For Ziggy)"	Arik Einstein	7:45
Total length:			21:35 (43:00)

== Personnel ==
- Arik Einstein – vocals, lyrics (Tracks 4, 6, 7, and 11)
- Stan Solomon – record engineering
- Misha Segal – piano, composing, arrangement, musical production
- Shalom Hanoch – backup vocals, lyrics (Track 3), arrangement (Track 2)
- Miki Gavrielov – bass guitar, backup vocals, arrangement (Track 4)
- Robb Huxley – guitar, backup vocals
- Haim Romano – guitar
- Shmulik Aroch – guitar solo on track 11, bass guitar
- Arale Kaminsky – congas (track 9), drums
- Ami Treibtsch – drums
- Yaakov Nagar – Hammond organ
- Ziggy Skrabnic – piano (track 11, archival recording)
