= Henryk Hechtkopf =

Polish-Israeli artist (1910-2004)

Henryk Hechtkopf הנריק הכטקופף
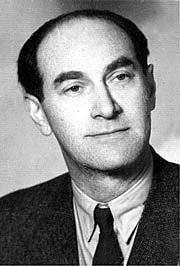
- Born: April 4, 1910; Warsaw, Poland
- Died: July 31, 2004 (aged 94); Bat Yam, Israel
- Education: University of Warsaw
- Known for: Painting, illustration, filmmaking
- Notable work: "Mikraot Israel" series; "Stories of the Tzadikim"; Warsaw Ghetto ruins drawings
- Spouse: Alicja Zielinska
- Awards: Shalom Aleichem Prize (1947); Israel Culture Foundation Prize (1974); Honorary Award from Bat Yam municipality (1985)

Henryk Hechtkopf (Hebrew: הנריק הכטקופף; April 4, 1910 – July 2004) was an artist, painter, and illustrator. His work encompassed a range of subjects and artistic styles, including biblical scenes, portraits, surrealism, and abstract expressionism. Hechtkopf was also a filmmaker and taught at the Łódź Film School. He illustrated numerous children's books in Israel, including the widely used "Mikraot Israel" series. Hechtkopf's art was influenced by his Jewish background and his experiences during World War II, with some of his works depicting the aftermath of the Holocaust being acquired by Yad Vashem. He received several awards for his artistic contributions, including the Shalom Aleichem Prize and the Israel Culture Foundation Prize.

== Biography ==
Henryk Hechtkopf was an artist and illustrator. Hechtkopf's work encompasses a range of subjects and artistic styles: biblical scenes and portraits, surrealism and abstract expressionism.

Hechtkopf was born to a Jewish family in Warsaw in 1910, the younger child of two. His father was a merchant, and his mother a midwife. Hechtkopf studied in the Hebrew Gymnasium "Chanoch" and then in Warsaw University. After obtaining his law degree, Hechtkopf became the first Jewish jurist to appear at the Polish Supreme Court.

At the age of 23, his work was consistently selected to appear in the exhibitions of the "Jewish Society for Promotion of Art." Hechtkopf was also a filmmaker. He was involved in the making of several films before the outbreak of World War II, including Poland's first animated film.

Hechtkopf's work was informed by his Jewish background, drawing on religious symbolism and Jewish life in the Shtetl. His experiences during World War II had an impact on his work. At the beginning of the war, he retreated with the Polish army east into the Soviet Union, where he was captured and sent to work in a series of forced labor camps. After the war, he returned to Poland to find that his whole family had been killed in the Holocaust. Hechtkopf's drawings in the weeks following his return to Warsaw portrayed the ruins of the ghetto and the city which surrounded it. Twenty-four of these works were purchased by the Yad Vashem Holocaust memorial in Israel. Hechtkopf designed in 1949 the first Polish stamp commemorating the Holocaust, and won first prize in an international competition for posters on the theme of Holocaust and heroism.

After the war, Hechtkopf was offered a position as a judge in Warsaw, but decided instead to move to Łódź, which was then the center of artistic life in Poland. In Łódź, he met his wife Alicja Zielinska. She has a sister Teresa Materne (Zielinska), who lives in Łódź (Poland) to this day. When his wife died on 15 September 1989, Hechtkopf kept good contact with his wife's sister.

He helped establish the Jewish artist's society in Łódź, which he headed from 1946 to 1950. He also taught film at the Łódź film school, where Roman Polanski numbered among his students. Before leaving Poland for Israel in 1957, Hechtkopf directed, together with Jan Batory, Poland's first post-war non-documentary successful film, "Forbidden Melodies" (1956).

Upon his arrival in Israel, Hechtkopf settled in Bat Yam, where he remained for the rest of his life, working as a painter and as an illustrator of books. He employed different styles and techniques in his work. His wife died in 1989. Hechtkopf died in July 2004, at the age of 94.

== Exhibitions ==
- 1963 – Society of Artists and Sculptors, Tel Aviv. Beitan Alcharizi
- 1963 – David Ben Ari Museum, Bat Yam
- 1966 - Beit Yad Lebanim Museum. Petach Tikva
- 1972 - David Ben Ari Museum, Bat Yam
- 1972 – Jerusalem Day Exhibition, Beit Haam, Jerusalem
- 1979 – Jerusalem Day Exhibition, Beit Ribak Museum, Bat Yam
- 1993 – 50 Years Since the Warsaw Ghetto Uprising Exhibition, Beit Ribak Museum, Bat Yam
- 1996 – Biblical Drawings Exhibition, Mishkan Omanot Museum, Ein Harood
- 1997 – Biblical Exhibition, Beit Ribak, Bat Yam
- 1997 – Debbie and Ori Nachushtan Museum, Asdot Yaakov
- 1997 – Corrine Maman Museum, Ashdod
- 1998 – Biblical Drawings Exhibition, Biblical Museum, Beit Diezengoff, Tel Aviv
- 2009 – planned Tel Aviv Drawings Exhibition in commemoration of Tel Aviv's 100 year anniversary, Beit Diezengoff, Tel Aviv (at the request of the Director of Beit Hatanach, Mr. Dani Ofir).

== Group exhibitions ==
Hechtkopf participated in dozens of group exhibitions in Israel and abroad. His work is exhibited in the museum in Berkeley, CA, in the Jewish Museum in Warsaw, and in the Yad Vashem Holocaust Memorial in Jerusalem. In addition, his works were included in exhibitions in Warsaw 1932–38. In addition, he exhibited in Lodz, Wroclaw, Kraków, Katovice.

== Illustrations ==
Hechtkopf illustrated hundreds of books, working with Israeli publishers, including Masada, Yavneh, Zimzun, Machanayim and Ofer. In addition, he served as the illustrator at Am Oved publishing house. He worked with several well-known Israeli authors, such as Benjamin Tene, Levin Kipnis, Rafael Saporta, Yemima Avidar-Tchernovitz, Asher Barash and others. Amongst the books that Hechtkopf illustrated:

- The "Mikraot Israel" Series, Masada Books, required textbooks for Grades 1-6 for all Israeli children in the state school system over a period of 30 years.
- The "Tmunot Mesaprot" (Tales of Pictures) Series, Yavneh Books. Hechtkopf illustrated all 28 versions of this text. Nearly all Israeli schoolchildren have a copy of this book.
- The "Stories of the Tzadikim", Machanaim Library Books. Translated into seven languages, it was printed in multiple editions worldwide. Many orthodox children in Israel have grown up with these stories. The Lubavitcher Rebbe himself requested that the best available illustrator be used for this book series, so he told Gershon Burkis, Machanaim Publishing House.

Hechtkopf illustrated many of Israel's most popular children's books.

== Prizes ==
- Shalom Aleichem Prize, Warsaw – 1947.
- First Prize, international poster competition commemorating five years since the Warsaw Ghetto Uprising - 1949.
- First Prize, competition for the design of the first Polish Stamp commemorating the Holocaust.
- Trade and Industry Ministry Prize for book design, Tel Aviv – 1963.
- Association of Painters and Sculptors Prize, Tel Aviv (in cooperation with the Bat Yam municipality).
- Israel Culture Foundation Prize, USA, 1974.
- Honorary Award from Bat Yam municipality for many years of artistic achievement – 1985.

Hechtkopf was also a portrait painter that captured the images of young girls, children, laborers and tradesmen. In addition, his work includes several themed series of drawings, including Tel Aviv, Jerusalem, Tzfat, Stories of Tzadikim, Biblical Stories, and others. He employed styles ranging from realism to surrealism and exciting abstract.

== Bibliography ==
- BAT-YAM ARTISTS (in Hebrew). BAT-YAM: BAT-YAM ARTISTS ASSOCIATION OF PAINTERS AND SCULPTORS. 2003. pp. 42―43.
