= Metzitzim =

- Original film poster
- Directed by: Uri Zohar
- Written by: Arik Einstein; Uri Zohar
- Produced by: Itzik Kol; Uri Zohar
- Starring: Arik Einstein; Uri Zohar
- Cinematography: Adam Greenberg
- Edited by: Avi Lifshitz
- Music by: Shalom Hanoch
- Distributed by: Geva Films
- Release date: 1972
- Running time: 90 minutes
- Country: Israel
- Language: Hebrew

Metzitzim (Hebrew: מציצים, English title: Peeping Toms) is a 1972 Israeli New Sensibility comedy film directed by Uri Zohar. It was written by Zohar and Arik Einstein. It is the first of Zohar's Tel Aviv Trilogy of films, and was followed by Big Eyes (1974) and Save the Lifeguard (הצילו את המציל, Hatzilu Et HaMatzil, 1977).

It was not an initial box office success in Israel. It was entered into the 23rd Berlin International Film Festival in June 1973, where it was well received. In the 1980s, it garnered a cult film status as a favourite of Tel Aviv's arthouse cinemas and through wider VCR distribution. It is widely regarded as one of Israel's greatest films of all time.

== Plot summary ==
Gutte (Zohar) and Eli (Einstein) are two thirty-something beach bums in Tel Aviv that refuse to grow up and accept adult responsibility. Their laidback lifestyle is centred on the beach, where they play pranks and look to sleep with women. Meanwhile, Eli neglects his domestic responsibility, preferring to spend time with Gutte at the beach, rather than be at home with his wife and daughter.

Gutte is so entrenched in his beach lifestyle that he even works a lifeguard and resides in a shack on the beach. He allows Eli to make use of the shack for his extramarital affairs.

His role also includes warding off voyeurs (Peeping Toms) from spying on the ladies' shower, although Gutte himself can't resist the scenes.

== Cast ==
- Arik Einstein - Eli, a married father and serial womanizer, who evades his adult responsibilities
- Uri Zohar - Gutte, a lifeguard that enjoys a laidback beach lifestyle and lives in a shack on the beach
- Sima Eliyahu - Mili
- Mona Silberstein - Dina (as Mona Zilberstein)
- Tzvi Shissel - Davidke
- Mordecai Ben-Ze'ev - Altman Sr. (as Mordechai Ben-Zeev)
- Moti Mizrahi - Altman Jr.
- Motti Levi - Avi
- Mordechai Arnon - Cab driver
- Margalit Ankory - Ruthie
- Zvia Doron - Fainting woman
- Eddie Cogan - Singer
- Aharonchik - Lifeguard
- Esther Zewko - Secretary (as Esther Zebco)
- Tova Farber - Street girl

== Release ==
It premiered in December 1972 at Orly cinema in Tel Aviv. It was entered into the 23rd Berlin International Film Festival in June 1973.

== Reception ==
=== Commercial ===
Although the film eventually emerged as one of the most well-known in Israel's history, it was not initially a major box office success. This has been attributed to it being released in winter, despite being a summer movie. The other attributed reason being that Israeli audiences were unprepared and not receptive to the vulgarity of the film.

Its commercial prospects and viewership increased exponentially in the 1980s. It garnered a cult film status as a favourite of Tel Aviv's arthouse cinemas and through wider VCR distribution.

=== Critical ===
The film was well received by critics when it entered into the 23rd Berlin International Film Festival in June 1973.

Although originally perceived as an "escapist beach comedy" in Israel, the film has since undergone a deeper critical analysis. In 2013, Dr. Ariel Schweitzer, curator of a Zohar retrospective, said that the Tel Aviv Trilogy reflects "the existential vacuum in Uri Zohar’s personal life and amid the group he was surrounded by. Over the years, some of them left their bohemian way of life in secular Tel Aviv and chose religion." Schweitzer continued: “But these films − two of which were created a little before the Yom Kippur War and the third immediately after it − are also a seismograph of Israeli society as a whole. They are a marker of the social crisis, the ideological vacuum that rose up and breached the surface immediately after that war.”

Schewitzer also said the film synthesises "popular cinema and modernist, personal cinema." He continued to note that the film has "influences of the French New Wave and Italian neorealism alongside popular elements."

Schweitzer also concluded with a feminist reading of the film, explaining: "True, there is chauvinism, machismo, vulgarity and great aggression, but there is also an element of self-loathing − especially in the characters that Zohar himself portrays himself in Peeping Toms and Einayim G’dolot. This self-loathing, of all the sexuality, vulgarity and machismo of the characters he plays, allows us to look at all these things in a critical way. Thanks to this critical perspective, I actually see Zohar as a feminist director."

In 2022, Uri Misgav, writing in Haaretz, praised the film and Einayim G’dolot (Big Eyes) (1973) as being " two of the best films ever made in Israel." Misgav continued: "Both films were written and shot from within the heart of a social scene and experience in Israel that was characterized by chauvinism, sexism and bohemianism – and they succeeded not only in documenting but also in critiquing that scene sharply, in real time and in all its abjectness." Misgav continued: "The result is that viewers are swept up into a truly stupendous cinematic journey in which they identify alternately and unceasingly with each of the characters, masculine and feminine, older and younger. There are no absolutely bad or absolutely good figures, only human beings with their vast array of virtues and foibles. But there is a clear truth hovering above all, which ultimately leaves the viewer with the bittersweet taste of the melancholy and emptiness that plague questions of human existence."

== Aftermath ==
In 2014, on season two of the show Orly and Guy Come Back With an Answer (אורלי וגיא חוזרים עם תשובה), journalists Orly Vilnai and Guy Meroz aired allegations that sexual misconduct took place during the film shoot. The focus was on speculation that the late Mona Silberstein had been a victim. The broadcast was discredited for its lack of substantive proof and absence of corroborating statements from Silberstein herself.

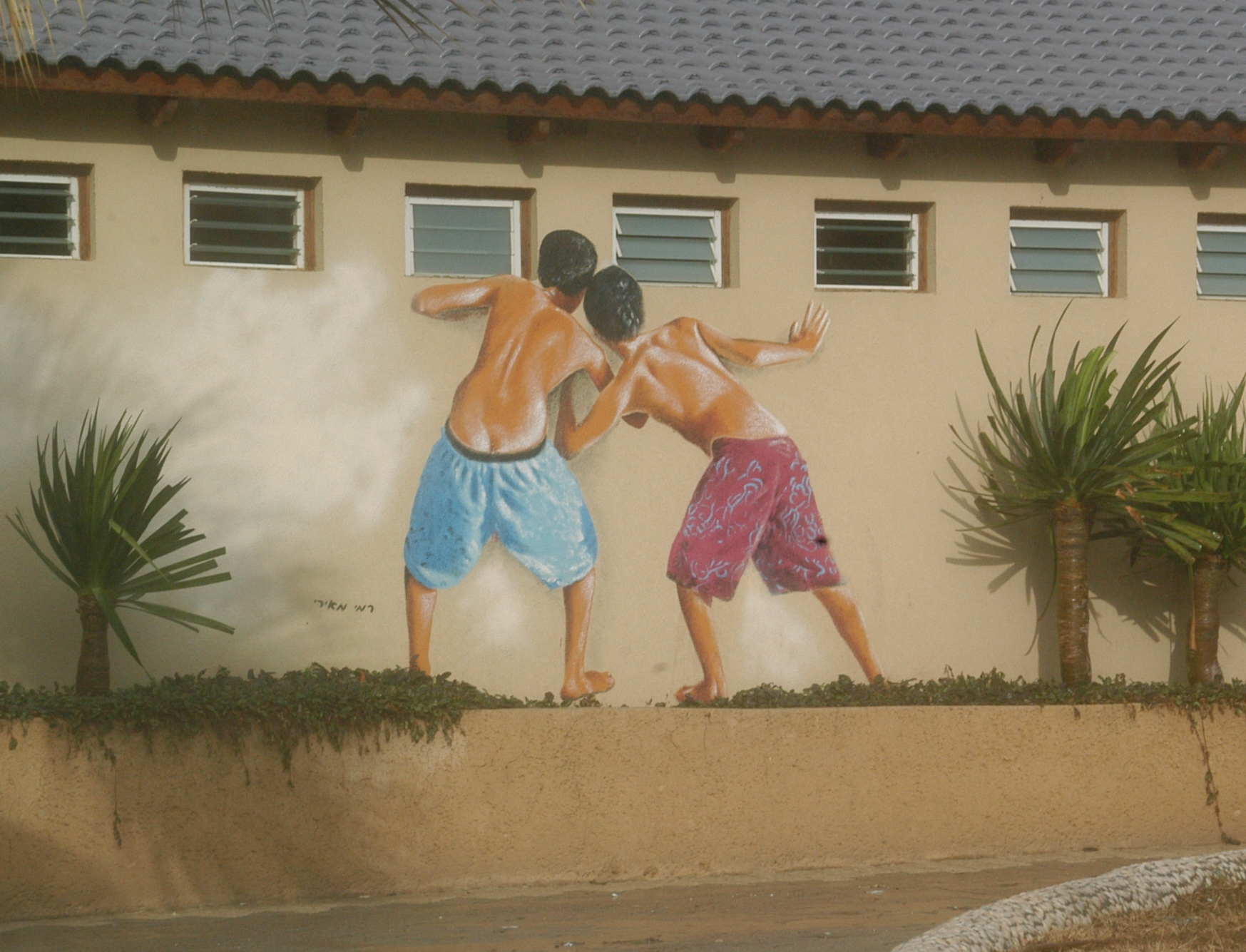
Rami Meiri's "Peeping Toms", Metzitzim Beach, Tel Aviv

In 2000 Rami Meiri drew a series of graffiti as a tribute to the film, but in 2020 they were removed by city authorities following the protests of feminist activists.
