= Rami Meiri =

Israeli artist

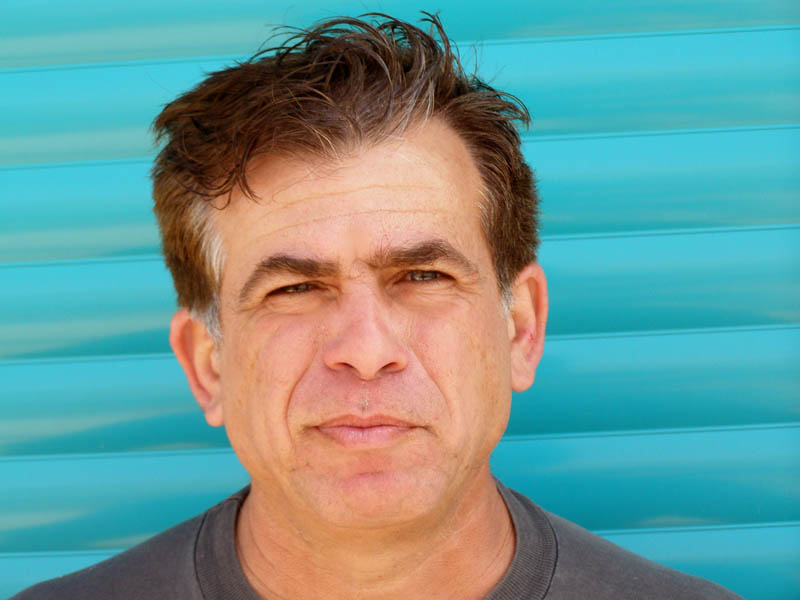
Rami Meiri

Rami Meiri (Hebrew: רמי מאירי; born 1957), is an Israeli graffiti artist. He defines himself as a multidisciplinary artist.

== Work ==
Rami Meiri is one of Israel's first graffiti artists. He specializes in a number of graffiti techniques, including brush, charcoal and spray. His work depicts real-life scenarios and characters.

He painted his first mural by the beachfront of Tel Aviv while studying art at the Avni Institute of Art and Design, Tel Aviv.

He is being commissioned for works in Israel and in other countries, e.g., China, Brazil, the United States, Portugal, Austria, Germany, Argentina, and South Africa. In a number of states his work was commissioned by Israel's embassies.

== Controversy ==
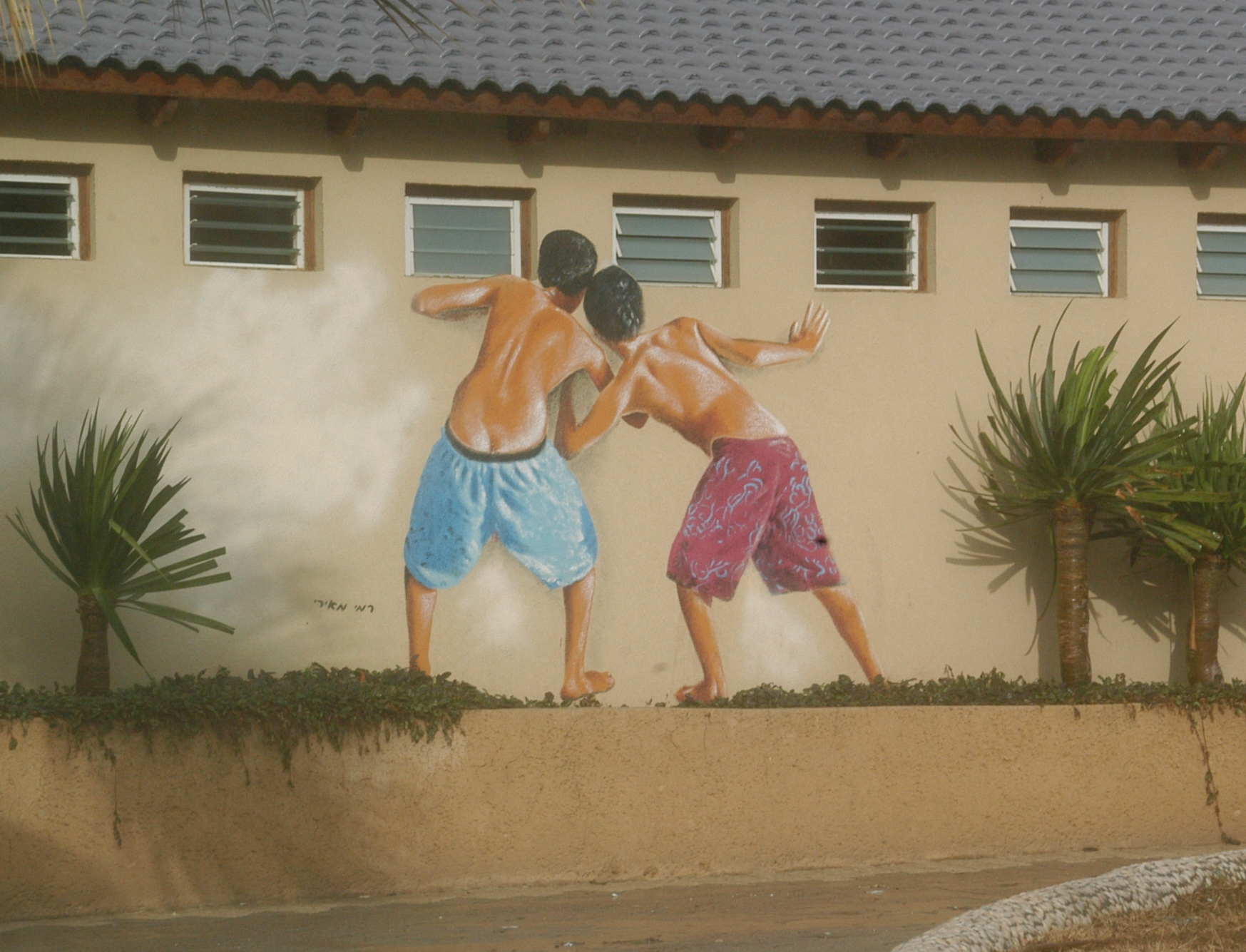
Rami Meiri's "Peeping Toms", Metzitzim Beach, Tel Aviv

In 2020 Meiri created a mural depicting men peeping into the women’s changing room at a beach. He described it as a humorous tribute to the 1972 cult comedy film Metzitzim (English title: Peeping Toms) and was drawn by the bathroom at a beach in Tel Aviv, named the Metzitzim Beach after the film. However the Tel Aviv Municipality decided to remove the mural after the repeated attempts to deface the mural by feminist activists, who, in their view, is demeaning towards women and "normalizes behavior that is criminal according to Israeli law". Meiri tried to negotiate with the activists how to modify the graffiti to convey the idea of combatting violence against women.

== Personal life ==
He is married to Rachel.
