= Cables (film) =

1992 Israeli comedy film

Cables (Hebrew: כבלים, romanized: Kvalim) is a 1992 Israeli comedy / parody film directed by Tzvi Shissel, which is a chain of sketches that parody various foreign films and TV programs, interspersed with songs by Arik Einstein and others. The episodes star many famous Israeli actors. A DVD edition was released in 2010.

== Plot ==
The frame story is that of a taxi driver, who had his cable TV installed. Overwhelmed with the abundance of TV channels, he, together with his buddy, flips the channels, thus flipping through a series of parody sketches.

The "Bravo alla Lancia" episode is a hilarious tribute to Federico Fellini's films, a street scene. The text is mostly Italian gibberish, with some recognizable international words.

In the mafia sketch, the gangster boss Charlie gives away bunches of dollars and kills people because when he asks what time is it now, their watches show different time as the time passes ("Why did you lie to me?"). One of sidekicks tries to reason him: "You cannot stop time, Charlie!", which had become a catchphrase in Israeli culture.

The "NBA Studio" episode is a parody of a sports program, in which Einstein is parodying the United States-born commenter Shimi Rieger, famous for good knowledge of basketball, but poor knowledge of Hebrew, and thus mixing Hebrew and Americanisms, as well as uttering funny idioms, with some of these becoming catch-phrases in Israel, such as הוא גדולה, הוא חזקה, hu gdula, hu chzaka, approximately "He is big, he is strong".

In the episode "Memories from Beit Abba", a broadcaster tries to shoot a documentary about three veteran brothers, but they disagree on almost everything, even about their own names, and it turns out that they are wrong brothers, and not even brothers at all, and that does not matter.

A short episode "Sea Lord" (ים אדוני, Yam Adonai) is an old humorous song by the comedy group Havurat Lul ("Chicken coop group") (of whom Einstein, Moshonov and Shissel were members), but in the film it was presented as a parody of Hasidic songs and in this form it is best remembered now. The song includes a cameo of Israeli prime minister, Yair Lapid in the chorus of extras.

"The French song" is a parody on pop music broadcasts, such as the MTV, sung in French gibberish, just like an Italian sketch.

"The Hungarian Western" sketch is a parody on Goulash Westerns, in which an gunman enters a pub, shoots someone, and the subsequent dialog is a gibberish in Hungarian, in which the words "kurwa" and "igen" are repeated with various intonations, both in interrogative and affirmative modes. "Igen" means "yes" in Hungarian, while "kurwa" is a Polish expletive meaning "whore". Both words are well recognized in Israel, where there are many immigrant families from Poland and Hungary.

== Production ==
About 20 years before the film, a group of authors, while working on other films accumulated a scrapbook of ideas. However they were not realised, because after some time the paths of the group parted. A decade later three of them, Arik Einstein, Tzvi Schissel, Moni Moshonov, recovered the scrapbook and decided to do something with it. The idea was inspired by the cable TV revolution in Israel in early 1990s. Initially a videotape release was planned, but eventually a theatrical release was done.
