= Yermi Kaplan =

Israeli American musician (born 1961)

Yermi Kaplan ירמי קפלן
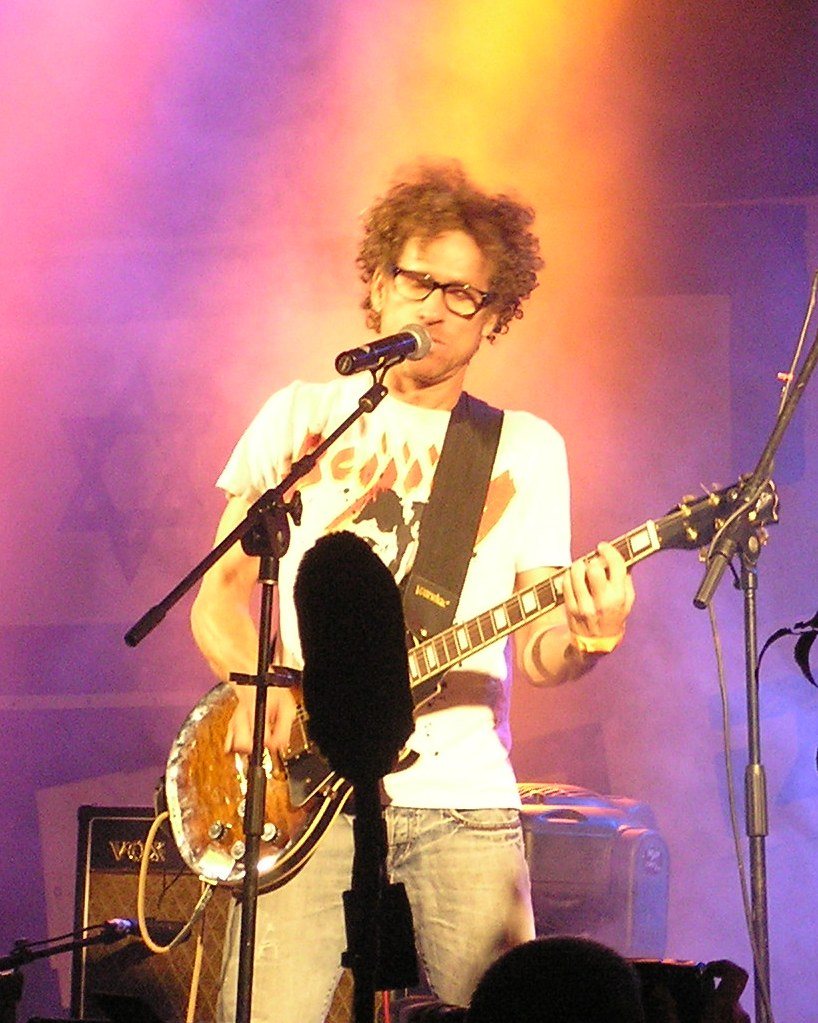
- Yermi Kaplan

Background information
- Born: Jeremy David Kaplan; September 3, 1961 (age 64); Chicago, Illinois, United States
- Genres: Rock, pop
- Occupations: Musician, singer-songwriter, producer
- Instruments: vocals, drums, guitar
- Years active: 1977–present
- Label: NMC

Yermi Kaplan (Hebrew: ירמי קפלן; born September 3, 1961, as Jeremy David Kaplan) is an Israeli American musician.

== Biography ==
Jeremy David Kaplan was born in Chicago on September 3, 1961, to television director Irving Kaplan and Orah Rivlin Kaplan. He immigrated with his family to Israel in 1969, and acted in a number of television and film roles in his childhood, including the Israeli English instruction program "Neighbors," and Operation Thunderbolt. During his studies at Alliance High School in Tel Aviv, Kaplan was drummer in Rami Kleinstein's band Solar Eclipse.
