= The Churchills (Israeli band) =

Israeli rock band

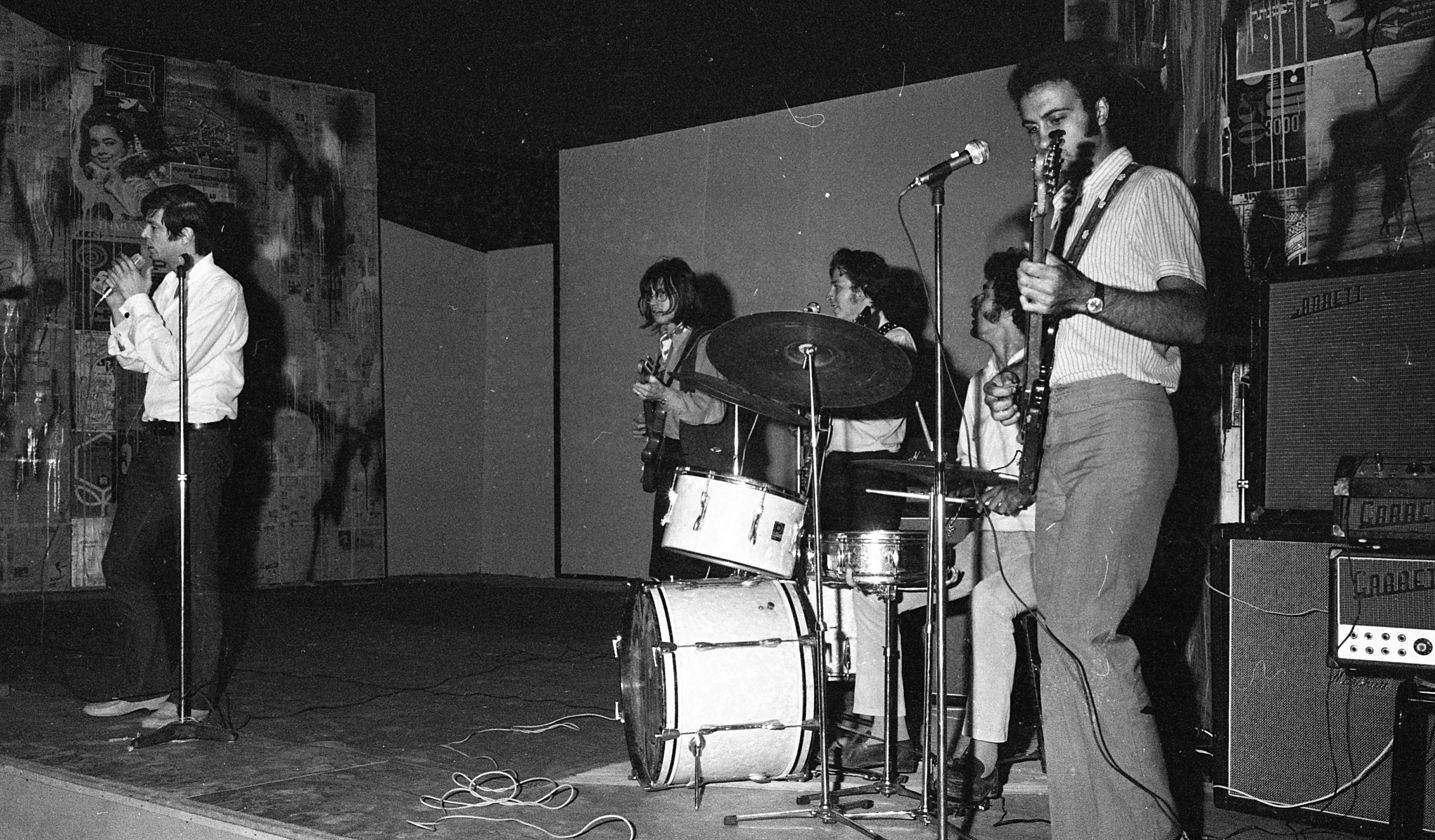

Background information
- Also known as: Jericho; Jericho Jones; The Churchills Band; The New Churchills
- Origin: Tel-Aviv, Israel
- Genres: Psychedelic rock
- Years active: 1965–1973
- Labels: Red Bus; Repertoire; Hed Arzi
- Past members: Yitzhak Klepter (died 2022); Stan Solomon (died 2021); Robb Huxley; Haim Romano; Miki Gavrielov; Ami Traibetch (died 2010); Roni Demol; Dani Shoshan; Shmulik Budagov

The Churchills was one of the first Israeli rock bands, formed by Yitzhak Klepter. They later became the backing band of Arik Einstein on his late 1960s and early 1970s rock efforts which helped the genre breakthrough in Israel.

== History ==
The Churchills was founded in 1965. The band played psychedelic rock music in English. Outside of Israel, it was active under the aliases of Jericho Jones and Jericho.

The band was a leading force in the early Israeli beat scene, but it was its cooperation with Arik Einstein that helped it cross over to the mainstream of Israeli pop and gain recognition. It began when the Churchills were invited to work with Einstein on his third solo album Poozy, recorded in 1969. This is considered by many to be the first rock album in Hebrew. The Churchills played on half of the tracks in that album, one of which was a Hebrew version of one of their own songs ("When You're Gone"). Following Poozy, the Churchills also played with Einstein in his gigs, and continued to play and produce three more albums with Einstein: Shablul (1970), Plastelina (1970) and On Avigdor's Grass (1971).

Contributing to the Churchills' sound at the time was the joining of two foreign members: Canadian vocalist Stan Solomon and British guitarist Robb Huxley (formerly with The Tornados).

The A-side of their last single, Time is Now, was written by Ray Dorset, who included his own version on his solo album Cold Blue Excursion.

== Band members ==
- First Ensemble (1965–1967)
  - Selwyn Lifshitz – vocals
  - Yitzhak Klepter – guitars
  - Haim Romano – guitars
  - Miki Gavrielov – bass
  - Ami Traibetch – drums
- Second Ensemble (1968–1969)
  - Haim Romano – guitars
  - Miki Gavrielov – bass
  - Ami Traibetch – drums
  - Stan Solomon – lead vocals
  - Robb Huxley – guitars, backing vocals
- Third Ensemble (1969–1972)
  - Haim Romano – guitars
  - Miki Gavrielov – bass
  - Ami Traibetch – drums
  - Robb Huxley – guitars, backing vocals
  - Dani Shoshan – lead vocals
- Fourth Ensemble (1972–1973)
  - Haim Romano – lead guitar
  - Robb Huxley – rhythm guitar, backing vocals
  - Dani Shoshan – bass, lead vocals
  - Chris Perry – drums
- Fifth Ensemble (1972–1973) (as The New Churchills)
  - Miki Gavrielov – bass
  - Ami Traibetch – drums
  - Roni Demol – guitars
  - Shmulik Budagov – guitars

== Discography ==
=== Albums ===
- 1968 Cherchilim (צ'רצ'ילים, "Churchill's") - Tracks: "Open Up Your Eyes"/"Song From The Sea"/"Pictures in my Mind"/"Comics"/"When You're Gone"/"Strangulation"/"Straight People"/"Subsequent Finale"/"So Alone Today"/"Debka"
- 1971 As Jericho Jones: Junkies, Monkeys and Donkeys (released in Israel as HaCherchilim) - Tracks: Mare Tranquilitatas / Man in the Crowd / There Is Always a Train/ Yellow and Blue / Freedom / Trangulum / No School to Day / Junkies Monkeys & Donkeys / What Have We Got to Lose / Mama's Gonna Take You Home
- 1972 As Jericho: Jericho - Tracks: "Ethiopia"/"Don't You Let Me Down"/"Featherbed"/"Justin And Nova"/"Kill Me With Your Love"

=== Singles ===
- 1968 "Too Much In Love To Hear" (Gale/Holder)/"Talk To Me" (A-side first recorded by The Tornados)
- 1970 Churchill Sebastian Bach: Coral for Young Lovers/Double Concerto (צ'רצ'יל סבסטיאן באך: קוראל לאוהבים הצעירים/קונצ'רטו כפול)
- 1970 "Signs of You"/"Living Loving"
- 1970 "She's a Woman"/"Sunshine Man"
- 1971 "Time is Now"/"Freedom"
- 2021 "Dangerous People"

=== Collaborations ===
- 1969 Arik Einstein – Poozy
- 1970 Arik Einstein & Shalom Hanoch – Shablul
- 1970 Arik Einstein & Shalom Hanoch – Plastelina
- 1970 Oshik Levi – Kzat Sheket
- 1971 Pupik Arnon – Kol Ehad
- 1971 Arik Einstein & Robb Huxley – Shirei Yeladim
- 1971 Arik Einstein & Miki Gavrielov – BaDeshe Etzel Avigdor
- 1973 Arik Einstein – Eretz Israel HaYeshana VeHaTova
