= Batzal Yarok =

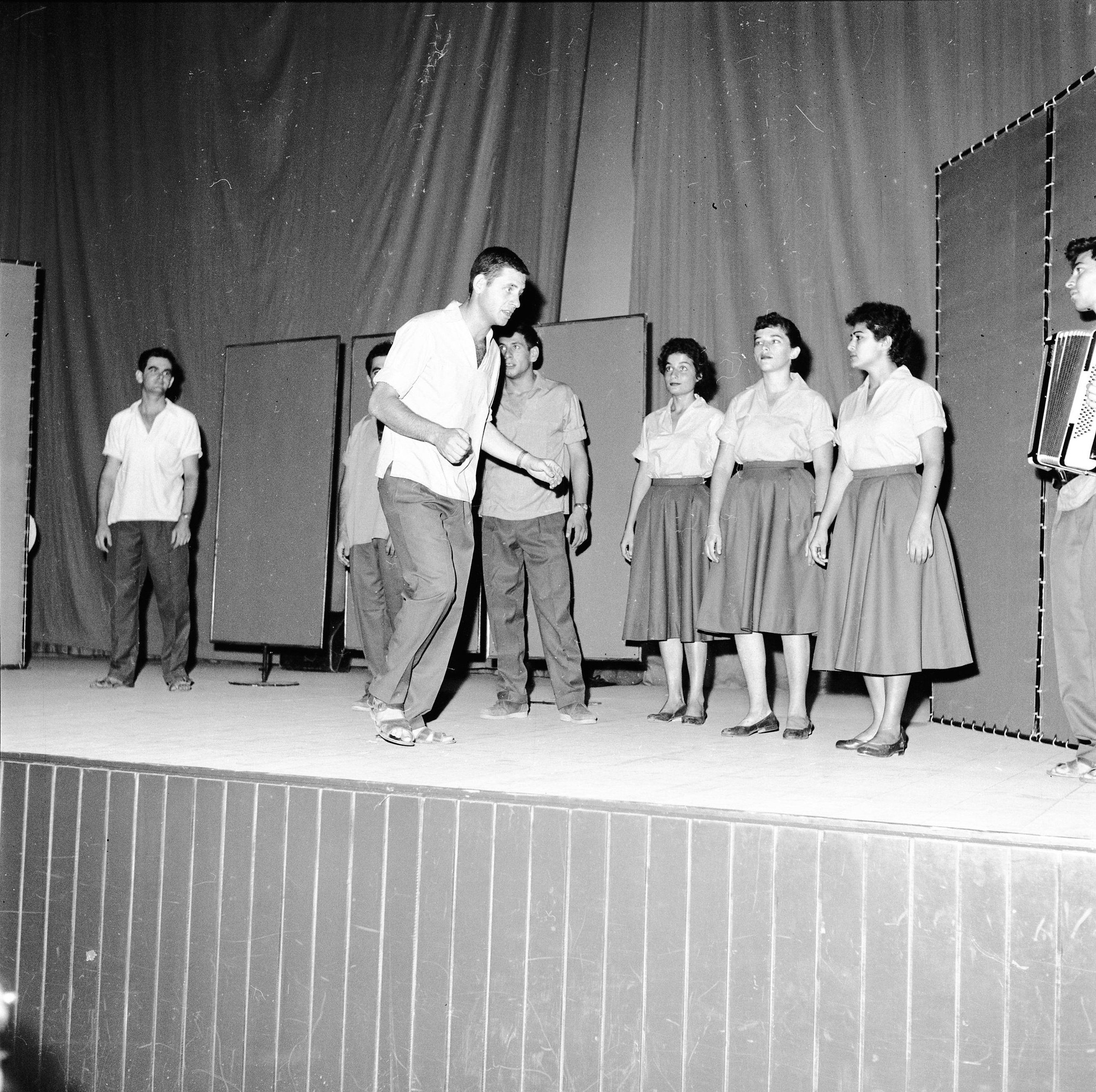
Batzal Yarok, 1958

Batzal Yarok (Hebrew: בצל ירוק; (lit. Green Onion) was an Israeli musical theatre and entertainment troupe founded in 1957 by ex-members of the IDF military ensemble Lehakat HaNahal.

== History ==
The troupe was among the best-known entertainment groups in Israel during the late 1950s and early 1960s. One of its founding members was Uri Zohar. Naomi Shemer wrote the texts for Batzal Yarok's first performance in 1957, and her song Zamar Noded ("Wandering Troubadour") was also written for the troupe. Chaim Topol performed with the group from 1960 to 1964. Ephraim Kishon wrote several satirical sketches for Batzal Yarok, and among the composers who wrote songs for the group was Sasha Argov.

== Shows ==
- Shmor Al HaGvul (Guard the Border) - This show was produced by the founders of the troupe before the end of their military service
- 1957: Kvisat HaRash (The Poor Man's Laundry) - A pun with the Hebrew words Kvisa (Laundry) and Kivsa (Sheep), referencing the biblical parable employed by Nathan the Prophet to condemn the relationship between David and Bathsheba.
- 1958: Hop Avarnu (Hop! We Moved)
- 1959: Af Mila LeMorgenstein (Not a Word to Morgenstein) - This show became the basis for a movie with the same name, filmed in 1963.
- 1959: Ve... Shalosh Nekudot! (And ... Three Points!)
- 1960: Chatul BaSak (Cat in the Sack).

== Troupe members ==
- Haim Hefer, lyricist and playwright
- Uri Zohar - Vocals, direction
- Ilana Rovina - Vocals
- Yona Atari - Vocals
- Shimon Israeli - Vocals
- Nechama Hendel - Vocals
- Zaharira Harifai - Vocals
- Gabi Amrani - Vocals
- Yosef Oreg - Accordion
- Chaim Topol and Galya Topol - Vocals
- Eliahu Barkai - Vocals
- Oded Kotler - Vocals
- Ruti Atias - Vocals
- Avraham Mor - Took part only in the first show.
- Nira Adi
- Aliza Kashi
- Arik Einstein
- Shai Danon
- Martin Brecher - Trumpet
- David Elshayach - Drums and percussion
- Shmuel Bonim

== See also ==
- Music of Israel
