= Arik Einstein =

Israeli musical artist

Arik Einstein אריק אינשטיין
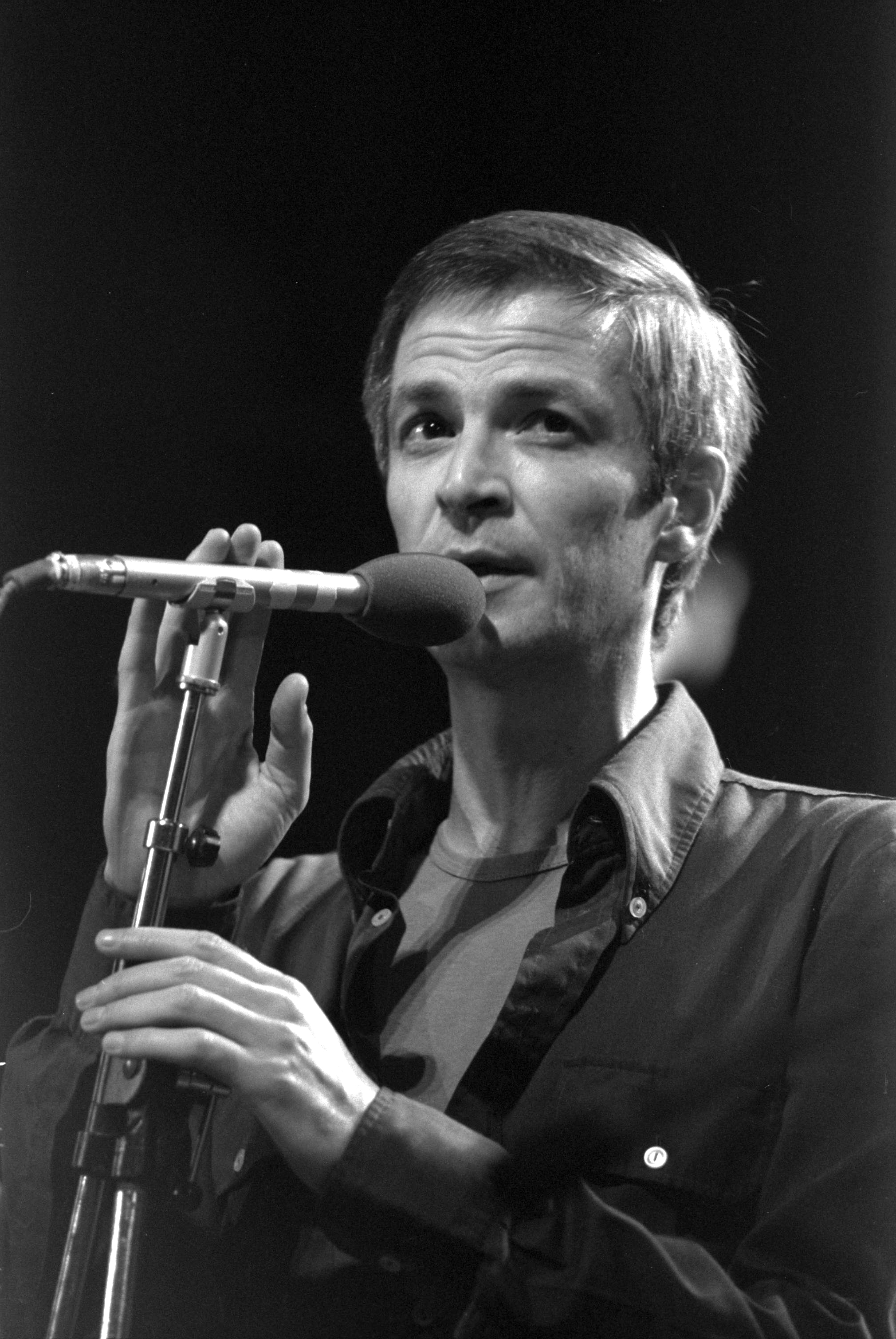
- Arik Einstein, 1979

Background information
- Born: Arieh Leib Einstein; 3 January 1939; Tel Aviv, Mandatory Palestine
- Died: 26 November 2013 (aged 74) Tel Aviv, Israel
- Genres: Israeli rock, Israeli pop, children's music
- Years active: 1957–2013
- Labels: Israphone; Helicon; Hed Artzi; Hagar-Phonokol; BNE; CBS; Phonokol; NMC; HaTaklit Haifa; Media Direct; HaTav HaShmini
- Formerly of: The Nahal Band; Batzal Yarok; Yarkon Bridge Trio; The High Windows

Arieh Lieb "Arik" Einstein (Hebrew: אָרִיק אַייְנְשְׁטֵייְן [ˈʔaʁik ˈʔajnʃtejn]; (3 January 1939 – 26 November 2013) was an Israeli singer, songwriter, actor, comedian and screenwriter. He was a pioneer of Israeli rock music and was named "the voice of Israel." Through both high public and critical acclaim, Einstein is regarded as one of the greatest, most popular, and most influential Israeli artists of all time.

A musical career that spanned over 50 years saw Einstein recording over 500 songs and releasing, collaborating, and featuring in 34 albums, far more than any other Israeli musician. Through the years he collaborated with many well-known Israeli singers and songwriters, including Shalom Hanoch, Miki Gavrielov, Yoni Rechter, and Shmulik Kraus. Einstein wrote many of his own songs and was a vocalist with The Churchills, Batzal Yarok and The High Windows. Einstein was also part of, and wrote songs for the Hashomer Hatzair youth movement.

== Early life ==
Arieh Lieb Einstein was born and raised in Tel Aviv, the only child of Ya'akov Einstein and Dvora. His father, Ya'akov, who was born in Warsaw and had immigrated to Palestine in 1929 with the HaShomer HaTzair movement, worked as an actor with the Ohel Theater. His mother Dvora was active in the Labor Zionist working women's organization Na'amat.

As a young man, he was a member of a North Tel Aviv branch of the HaShomer HaTzair movement, in addition to his extensive involvement in sports through the Hapoel Tel Aviv sports club. Einstein was Israel's junior high jump and shot put champion, and also played basketball for Hapoel Tel Aviv B.C. His father urged him to audition for an army entertainment troupe, and he was accepted into Lehakat HaNahal.

== Music career ==
=== 1959–1966: Early career ===
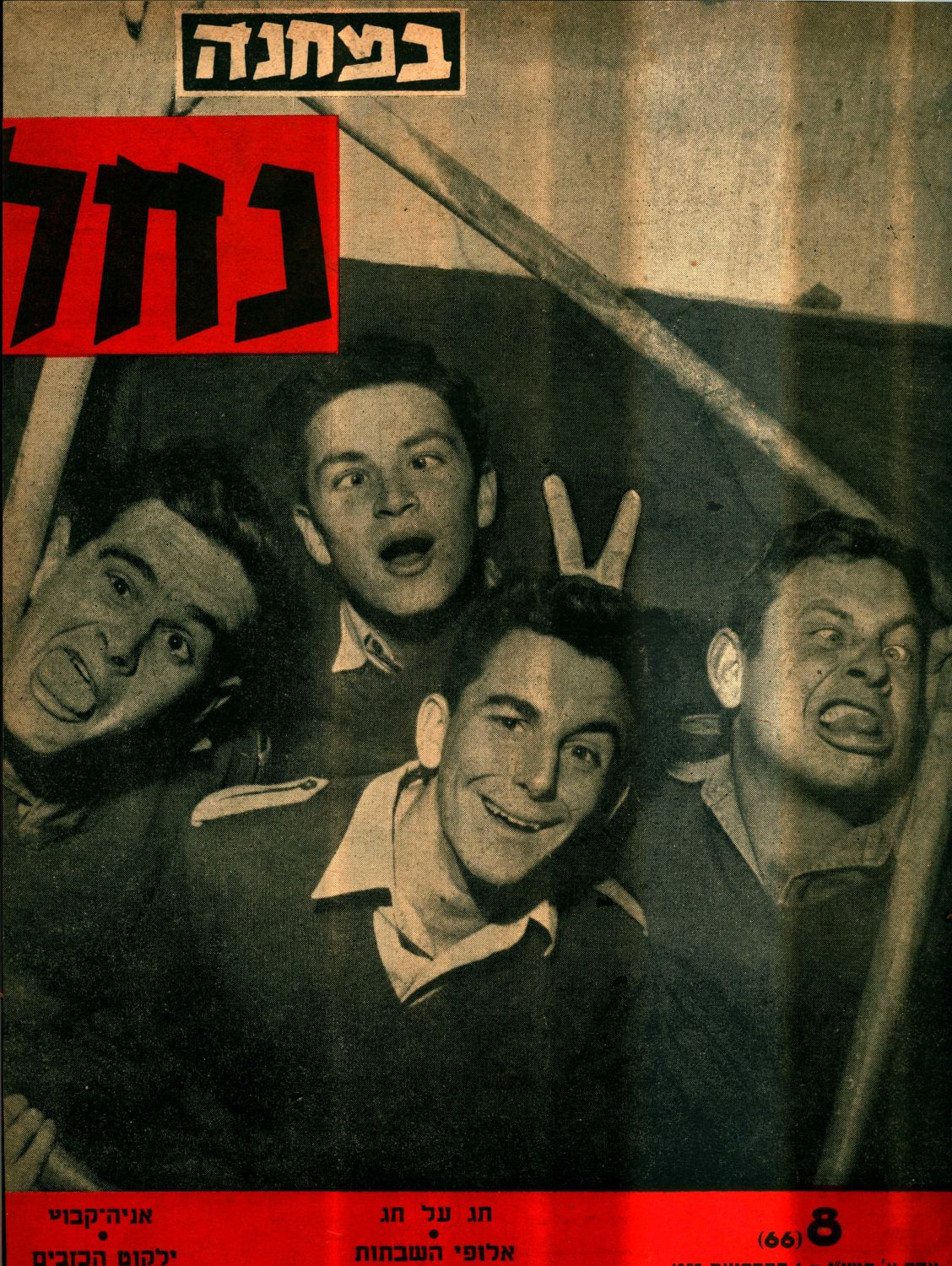
Einstein (the one giving the peace sign) on the cover of Bamahane Nahal alongside other members of Lehakat HaNahal.

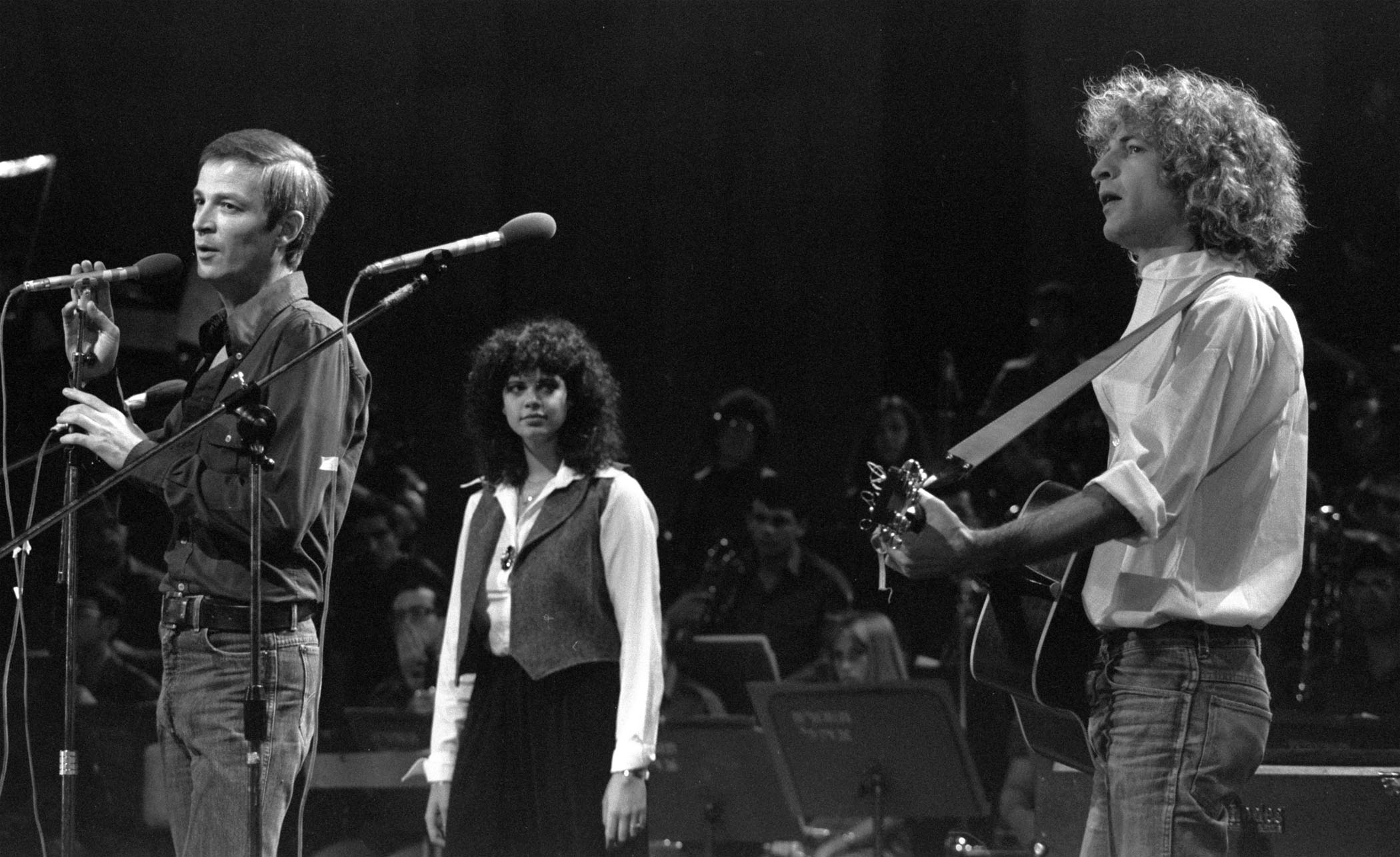
Arik Einstein performing with Shalom Hanoch

Before joining the army, Einstein, a sports enthusiast and an athlete throughout his teenage years, thought about becoming a military fitness instructor. However, due to his poor eyesight, his father encouraged him to try out for the military ensembles. After a few auditions, Einstein was accepted to the prestigious and highly regarded Nahal Brigade army troupe, which historically paved the way for many of Israel's most talented and successful musicians. Despite his shyness, Einstein's unique voice and singing were quickly noticed, and he was picked soon thereafter to perform a few solo songs, with "Ruach Stav" ("Autumn Wind") being the most prominent one.

In 1959, after his release from the IDF, Einstein joined Batzal Yarok (the Green Onion band) and the Sambation theatre. In 1960, he released his first solo album. He sang in a band under the pseudonym "Ari Goren". In the Yarkon Bridge Trio, he performed with Yehoram Gaon, Benny Amdursky and later Israel Gurion. In 1964, he played in the comedy film Sallah Shabbati, along with Chaim Topol, who was also from the Green Onion band.

=== 1966–1971: The High Windows and first rock efforts ===
In 1966, Einstein joined The High Windows with Shmulik Kraus and Josie Katz. Their first album went on sale in April 1967, six weeks before the Six-Day War, signaling a new direction in Israeli rock and pop. The album achieved considerable commercial success and its popularity was felt even in parts of Western Europe, primarily France. After a few concerts in Europe Einstein left the group after one year in the wake of a professional disagreement with Kraus. At the heart of things, Einstein felt uncomfortable creating music for a European audience who cannot truly appreciate the richness of the lyrics after it went through translation to French. He believed that the Hebrew language was intrinsic to his music. When interviewed many years later and asked about that period in Europe Einstein stated "Performing in a different language? It's bullshit. We are Hebrew artists, why should we pretend otherwise?" Nevertheless, Einstein and Kraus remained close friends and would collaborate again in the future.

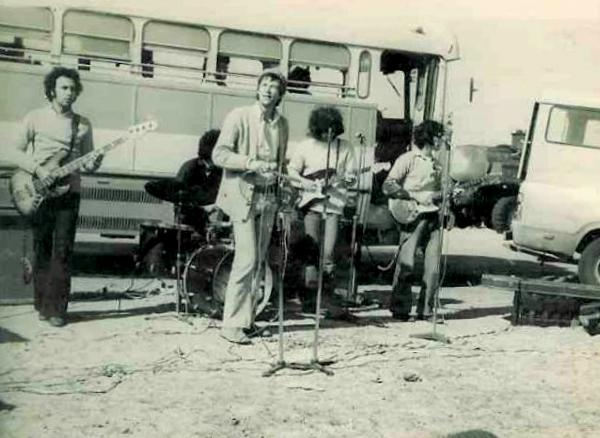
Arik Einstein with "The Churchills"

Two years later, Einstein released the album Mazal Gdi (Capricorn), which was not very successful. He therefore looked for a new sound and went on to produce the album Poozy with the Churchills, considered the first Israeli rock album. He continued issuing albums during the 1970s and 1980s, often in collaboration with other top artists like Shalom Hanoch, Yoni Rechter, Yitzhak Klepter, and Shem Tov Levi. Most of those albums are widely considered breakthrough masterpieces in Israeli rock and pop.

Most notable of his collaborations was his album Badeshe etzel Avigdor (At Avigdor's on the Grass) with Miki Gavrielov which featured Einstein's most popular track "Ani Ve Ata" (Me and You). The 1971 record has a strong influence from the rock music of the 60s, particularly The Beatles and Simon and Garfunkel. "Ani Ve Ata" is considered to be Israel's effort at replicating John Lennon's hope-inspired number "Imagine".

=== 1973–2013 ===
Einstein stopped performing live in the early 1980s. He said: "I performed from the age of 18 until I was 42...I wasn't exactly a stage animal. I was held back by the embarrassment, the bashfulness, and it became more evident as the years went by... By the way, when I say bashfulness, I'm not proud of it... I wish I could grab a microphone and sing like a Sinatra, but I don't have what it takes, and a person should adapt to his capabilities. On the other hand, in the studio, I blossom. That's my natural habitat, where I'm not bashful. The problem is that this profession has its field mines: success is accompanied by fame and a form of adoration, and I really don't get along with that. That's where I draw the line. It's pleasant to be loved, but not more." For those who knew Einstein this came as no surprise. Einstein was regarded as a very humble and modest musician who focused solely on the artistic and creative aspect of the musical world and actively shied away from the lime-light, fame, and the entertainment business. This was also evident much later in his career when he preferred to collaborate with lesser known and younger musicians as the lifestyle and obsession with fame of more prominent artists did not suit his style.

Video Clip of Arik Einstein

In 1973, Einstein turned to renewal of old Hebrew songs written mostly in the first half of the 20th century. Until the mid-1990s, in parallel to releasing his own original albums, Einstein concurrently released a series of albums under the name The Old and Good Land of Israel which encompassed a multitude of genres – songs of the homeland from the beginning of Jewish settlement to the ballroom style songs from the 1950s – using modern adaptations with musicians such as Shem-Tov Levi, Yoni Rechter and Avner Kenner. According to him, he did it not for the perpetuation of the songs, but simply because he loved to sing them.

In 2004, Einstein released Shtei Gitarot Bas Tupim (Two Guitars, Bass, Drums). He sang a duet with David D'Or on D'Or's CD, Kmo HaRuach ("Like the Wind") released on 27 March 2006. In 2010, Einstein was the most played artist on radio stations in Israel, according to Society of Authors, Composers and Music Publishers in Israel, ACUM (אקו"ם). In 2011, he released a new song in honor of the return of abducted IDF soldier Gilad Shalit. "You'll always be a hero", Einstein sings. "You are allowed to cry. It's not simple at all, to forgive fate."

== Acting career ==
Einstein was one of the celebrities in the iconic film Sallah Shabati, which many consider to be the beginning of popular Israeli cinema. The film depicted Mizrahi Jews meeting modern Israeli society, and Einstein played the boyfriend of the protagonist's daughter. He also starred and acted alongside Uri Zohar in Zohar's Metzitzim (1972) and Big Eyes (1974).

=== The Lool Gang and the album with Hanoch ===
Einstein was part of the early 1970s TV series Lool (Chicken Coop), a sketch-and-song show with an original format and cast known as the "Lool Gang" (Havurat Lul, "Chicken coop group)). Lool featured songs written by prominent Hebrew poets performed by some of the best singers Israel has ever produced, including Einstein, Shmulik Kraus, Shalom Hanoch, Miki Gavrielov, and many more. It conceptualized the liberal bohemian wave that had reached Tel Aviv by the late 1960s and gave way to exceptional artistry and performance as seen in Lool. The creative think-tank of that group (and the director of many of skits) was Uri Zohar, one of the most brilliant comedians, actors, and performers in Israeli history, previously regarded as Israel's "King of the Seculars and Bohemians" and Einstein's closest friend. In a move that shocked much of the public, Zohar left the entertainment industry in the late 1970s to become a rabbi, and became one of the most prominent religious figures in Israel. Einstein greatly admired Zohar but even for him such drastic change was not easy to comprehend, as was evident in a song Einstein dedicated to Zohar's religious transformation called "Hoo Chazar be'Tshuva" ("He Returned to Religion").

Despite the fact that it had only four episodes, it remains a cult show with many of its skits regarded as timeless Israeli classics. Lool showcased Einstein as both a top-of-the-line singer and comedian.

In May 1970, the film Shablool ("Snail") was released, serving as a continuation to Lool, consisting of a series of sketches coupled with songs. These songs formed the joint album of Einstein and Shalom Hanoch, Snail, released the same year. The album is considered one of the most influential albums in Israeli rock, and many have chosen it as the greatest Israeli rock album of all time. Hanoch composed all the songs and wrote almost all of them.

== Critical acclaim ==
In 2009, Haaretz columnist Ariel Hirschfeld wrote: "Arik Einstein's well-known reclusiveness, his ordinariness, his aversion to pomposity and grandiosity, his modest way of belonging to this place – these should not hide from those living here the fact that he is a very great and profound artist, with an acute artistic conscience, perfect and totally unique."

A prominent music critic, Yoav Kutner, described Einstein stating "Arik Einstein is more than the greatest Israeli artist of all time. Einstein is the real Israel himself."

== Death ==
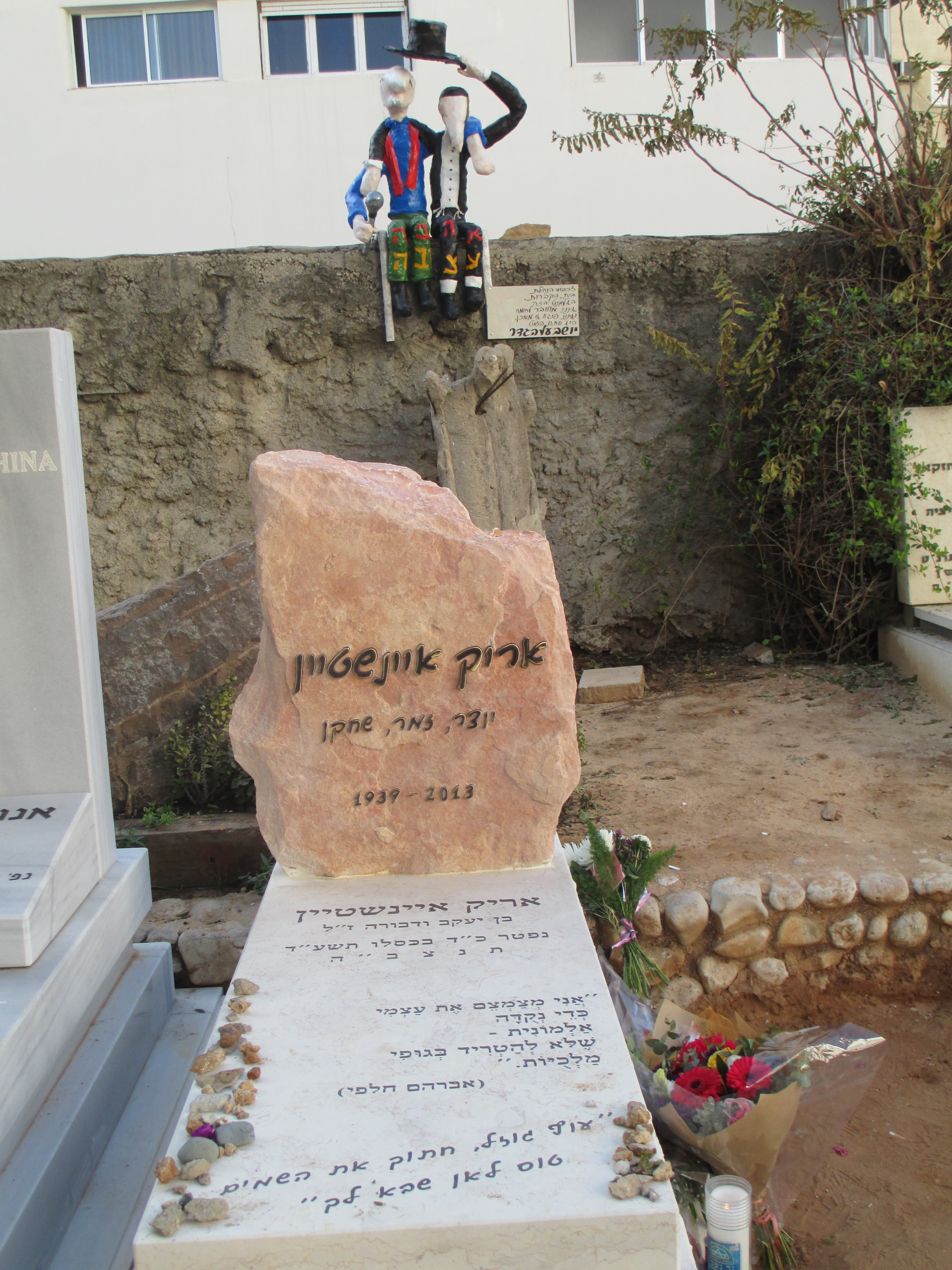
Grave of Arik Einstein

On 26 November 2013, Einstein, a heavy smoker, died age 74 after a ruptured thoracic aortic aneurysm. He arrived at the Tel Aviv Sourasky Medical Center unconscious after he collapsed at his home earlier in the day. His hospitalization in the hours leading up to his death was closely monitored and reported by every news network in Israel with all three major news channels broadcasting the developments as "breaking news" for hours. At the news of Einstein's death, Israeli Prime Minister Benjamin Netanyahu issued a statement describing his songs as the "soundtrack of Israel." President Shimon Peres stated that he was beloved for his voice that "came from the depths" and his songs would "continue playing life and hope" long after him.

Israel's leading radio station, Galgalatz, played his songs for 48 consecutive hours. He was buried in Trumpeldor Cemetery in Tel Aviv. Prior to the funeral, his body lay in state in Rabin Square, where thousands gathered to pay their respects.

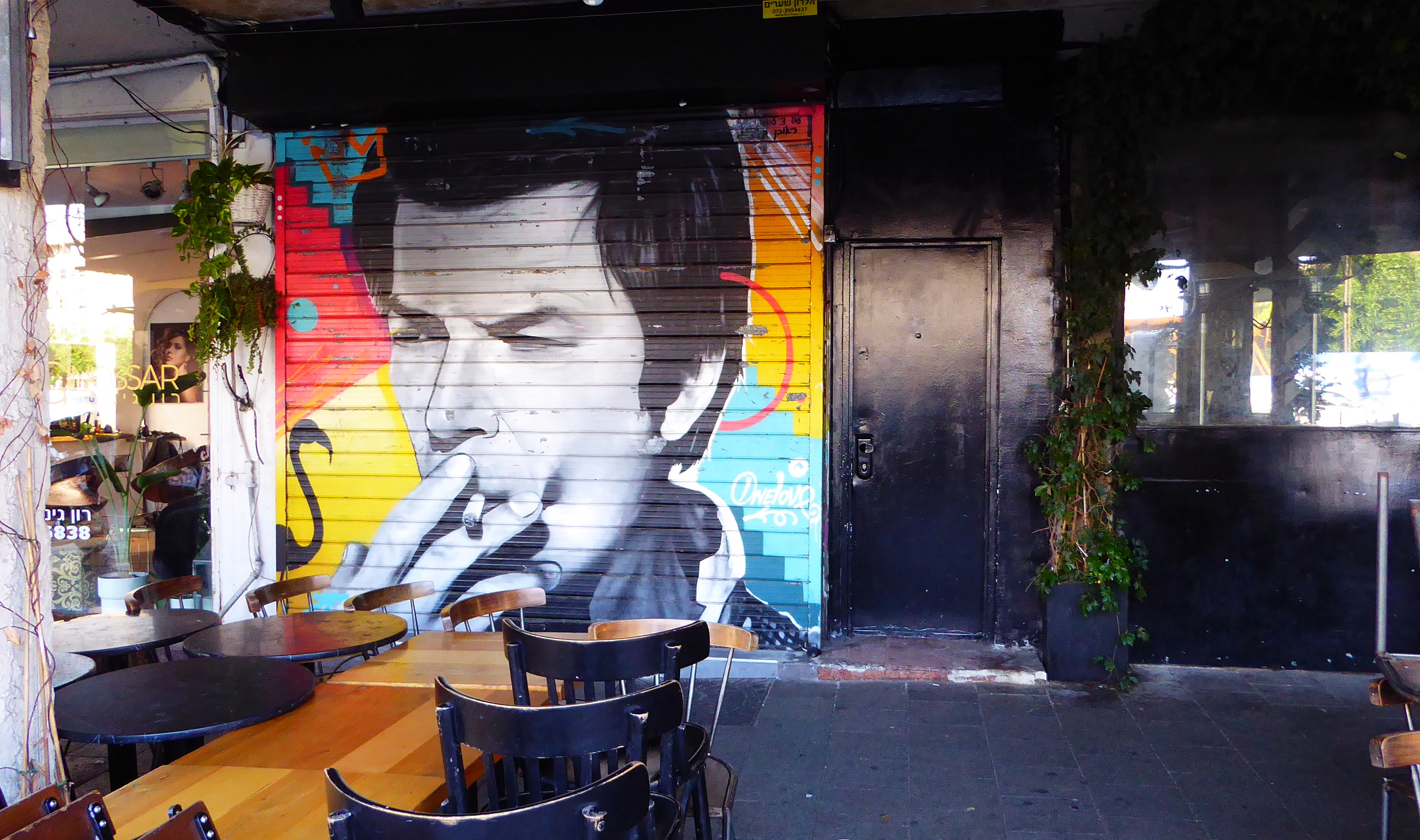
Arik Einstein's portrait in street art in a Tel Aviv cafe

Einstein's funeral was attended by tens of thousands of people, including the Prime Minister, Israel's leading artists and musicians, and hundreds of friends and family. The burial was led by one of his closest friends, Uri Zohar, a former Israeli film director, actor, and comedian who became a rabbi and with whom Einstein has 17 common grandchildren (two of Einstein's daughters became religious and married Zohar's oldest sons).

On 7 October 2014, 40,000 people assembled for a concert in his honor, led by his longtime collaborators such as Miki Gavrielov but also including many other of the great artists spanning many decades of Israeli popular music. The video of the concert has not been released.

== Personal life ==
In 1963, Arik Einstein married Alona Shochat in the hall of Habima Theater (where he was onstage in a production of Irma La Douce). (Note: Alona was daughter of aluf mishne (colonel) Gideon Shochat, one of the IAF's first pilots, and granddaughter of Israel and Manya Shochat.) After four years of marriage, during which their daughter Shiri was born, the couple divorced. A year later, in 1968, they remarried. Their daughter Yasmin was born in 1971. They divorced again in 1972. Alona Einstein died in 2006 from cancer. Arik Einstein's second wife was Sima Eliyahu, whom he met shortly before filming the movie Metzitzim in 1972. They had a daughter and a son: Dina and Amir.

Despite a successful acting and singing career, Einstein considered himself shy and a homebody. In one of his songs he sang that his greatest pleasure was staying home with a cup of lemon tea and his books, and in this he was being sincere. In a candid TV interview he said that performing in front of big crowds was difficult for him (without the help of a few glugs of cognac beforehand). For this reason he stopped giving public concerts after 1981, despite receiving many attractive offers which by the late 1990s had reached seven figures. In 1982 he was hurt in a major car accident. His wife was also hurt, and another friend lost her life. Following the accident Einstein's eyesight, which was already myopic, got even worse and he spent even less time in public.

Einstein was also well known for his love of sports and his deep knowledge of sports trivia, for which he jokingly nicknamed himself "the world champion in unimportant information". He was an avid fan of the Hapoel Tel Aviv sports club, for which he competed in his youth, particularly Hapoel Tel Aviv F.C. and Hapoel Tel Aviv B.C. Several of his songs mention his love for sports in general and for the Hapoel Tel Aviv clubs in particular. Fans of Hapoel's basketball team ran a petition for the team's new arena, the Drive in Arena which was inaugurated in 2015, to be named after Einstein – but their request was not granted.

== Works ==
=== Discography ===
Studio albums

- 1966 – Shar bishvileh (Singing for you)
- 1968 – Mazal Gdi (Capricorn)
- 1968 – Yashan Vegam Hadash (Old and also New)
- 1969 – Poozy
- 1970 – Shablul (Snail)
- 1970 – Plastelina (Plasticine)
- 1971 – Shirey Yeladim (Kids' Songs)
- 1971 – Badeshe etzel Avigdor (At Avigdor's on the Grass)
- 1972 – Yasmin (Jasmine)
- 1973 – Hashanim Harishonot (The First Years)
- 1973 – Eretz Yisrael Hayeshana veHatova (Good Old Land of Israel)
- 1974 – Sa leat (Drive slowly)
- 1975 – Shirim (Songs)
- 1976 – Eretz Yisrael Hayeshana veHatova bet (Good Old Land of Israel part 2)
- 1976 – Yeladim (Kids)
- 1976 – Haahava panim rabot la (Love Has Many Faces)
- 1977 – Eretz Yisrael Hayeshana veHatova Gimel (Good Old Land of Israel part 3)
- 1978 – Leket (Medley)
- 1978 – Yeladudes (Kiddos)
- 1980 – Eretz Yisrael Hayeshana veHatova-Meshirey Sasha Argov (Good Old Land of Israel-Sasha Argov's Songs)
- 1980 – Hamush Bemishkafaim (Armed With Glasses)
- 1981 – Leket Leyladim (Collection for Kids)
- 1982 – Yoshev Al Hagader (Sitting on the Fence)
- 1983 – Shavir (Fragile)
- 1984 – Pesek Zman (Time Out)
- 1984 – Nostalgia-Eretz Yisrael Hayeshana veHatova (Nostalgia-Good Old Land of Israel)
- 1985 – Totzeret Haaretz (Made in Israel)
- 1986 – Ohev Lihiyot Babait (Love Being Home)
- 1987 – Al Gvul Haor (On the Boundary of Light)
- 1988 – Meshirey Avraham Halfi (Avraham Halfi's Songs)
- 1989 – Hashanim Harishonot (The First Years)
- 1989 – Haiti Paam Yeled (I was a Boy Once)
- 1992 – Nostalgia-Eretz Yisrael Hayeshana veHatova (Nostalgia-Good Old Land of Israel)
- 1992 – Haarye, Hayona, veTarnegolet Kchula (The Lion, The Dove, and a Blue Chicken)
- 1995 – Yesh bi Ahava (Got Love in Me)
- 1996 – Ktzat lakahat Hazara (Take Back a Little)
- 1997 – Lean Parchu Haparparim (Where Have the Butterflies Gone)
- 1999 – Muscat
- 2002 – Shemesh Retuva (Wet Sun)
- 2004 – Shtei Gitarot, Bass, Tupim (Two Guitars, Bass, Drums)
- 2006 – Rega'im (Moments)
- 2007 – Kol HaTov Shebaolam (All the Good Things in the World)

=== Books ===
- 1981 – Arik Einstein: Songbook (edited by Michael Tapuach)
- 1985 – Arik Einstein: A Selection of 20 Songs for Children
- 1989 – Lool (edited by Arik Einstein and Zvi Shisel)
- 1991 – Arik Einstein: Second Songbook (edited by Arik Einstein and Michael Tapuach; music editor: Bart Berman)
- 2006 – Arik Enstein: Zo Ota Ha-ahava (edited by Ali Mohar)

=== Other ===
The 1992 Israeli parody film Cables was scripted by Arik Einstein, Moni Moshonov, and Zvi Shissel. It includes five songs of Arik Einstein, and Einstein himself plays a role of a gangster. It is a collection of sketches, with the frame story being a guy (played by Einstein) flipping cable TV channels.

== Commemoration ==
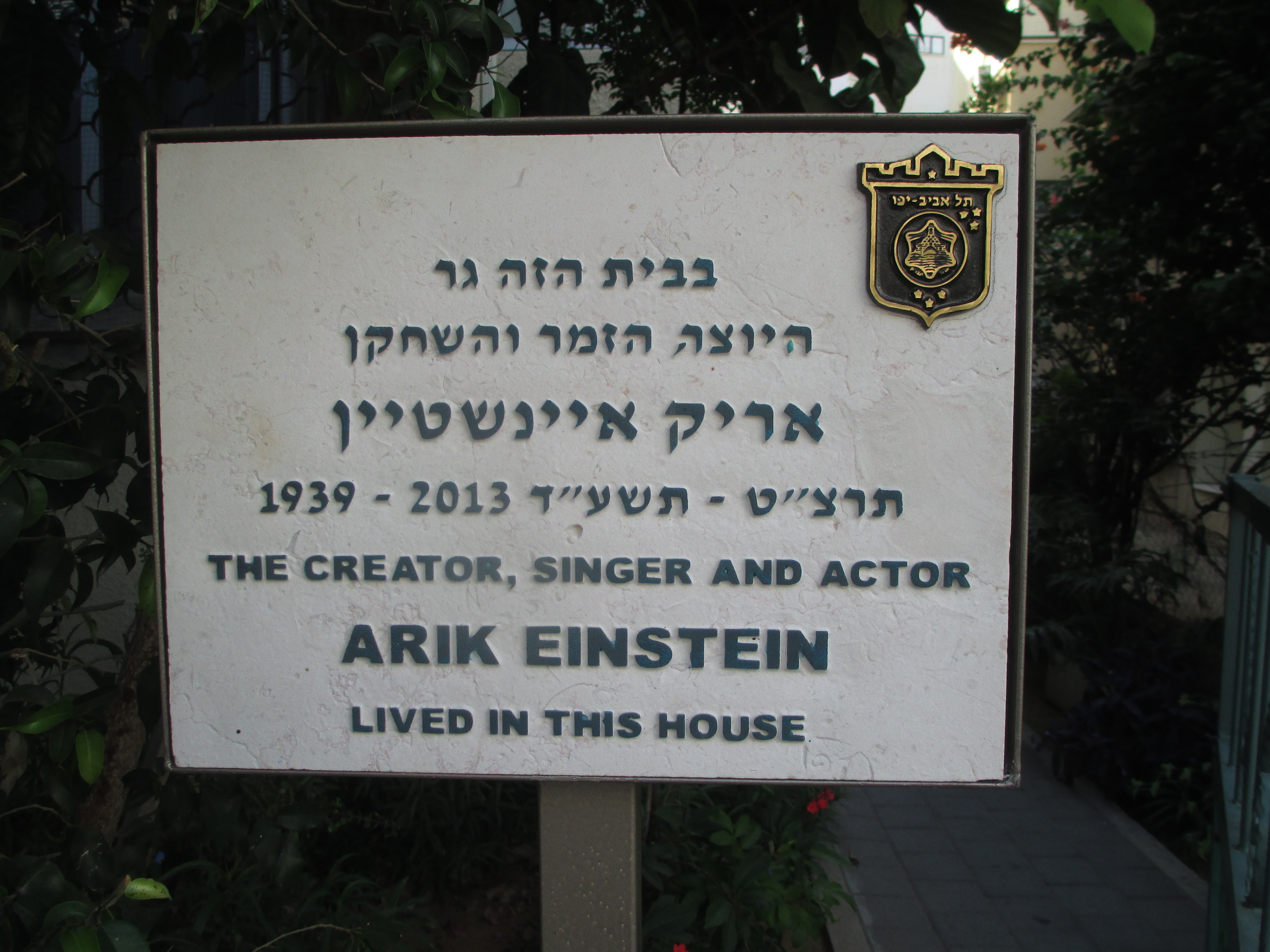
Memorial plaque

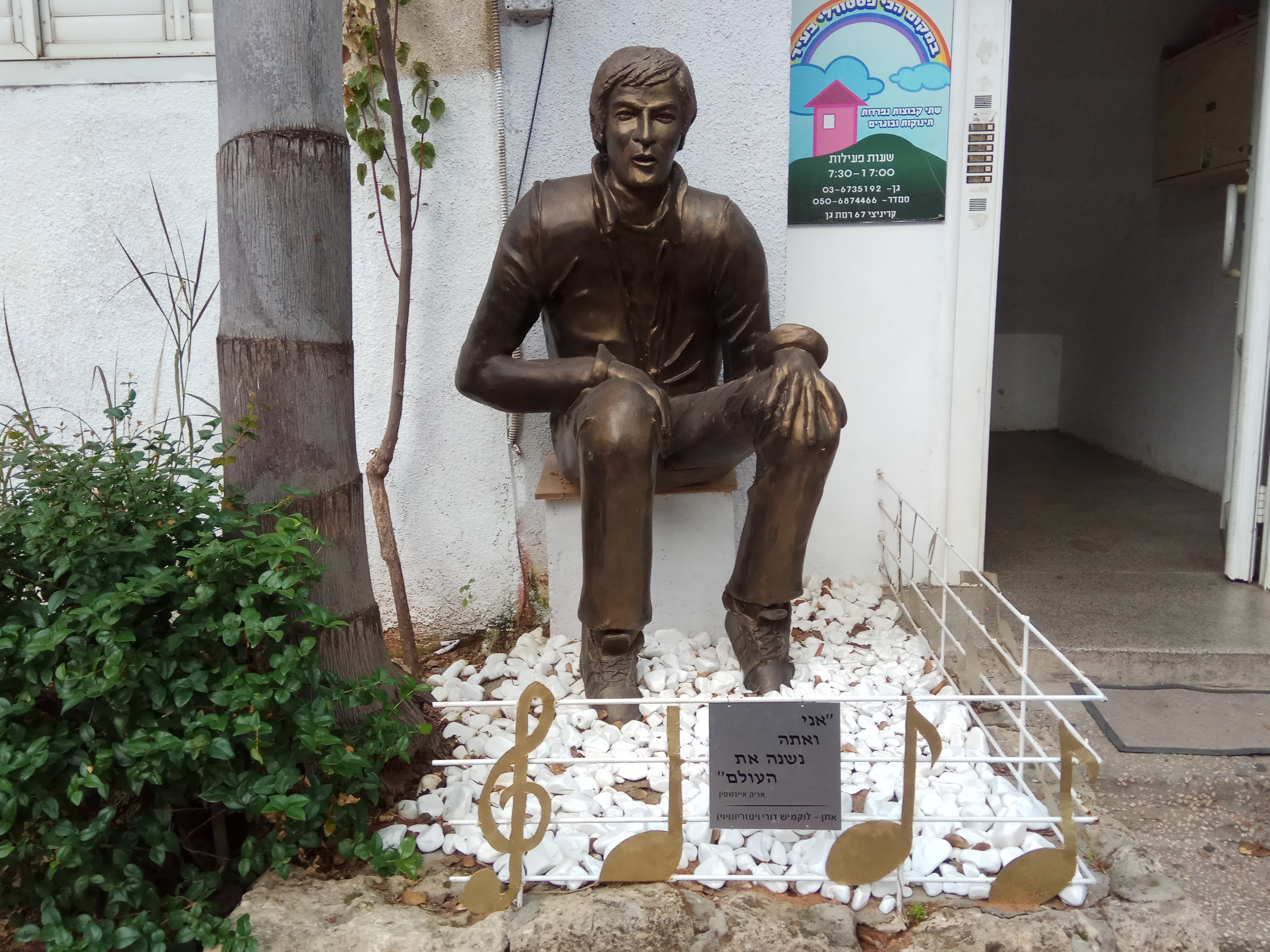
A statue of Arik Einstein in Ramat Gan

In 2013 the Ministry of Culture and Sport instituted the Arik Einstein Award as an "expression and appreciation for veteran artists from the various creative fields who have made a significant contribution to culture in Israel who left their mark on it and helped and contributed to its development for generations."

In 2017 a documentary TV series "A Standard Love Song: Arik Einstein" was broadcast about his life and work. The series won the Television Academy Award in the documentary series category.

A number of places in Israel are named after Arik Einstein.
