= Yarkon Bridge Trio =

Israeli Music Band

Yarkon Bridge Trio שלישיית גשר הירקון
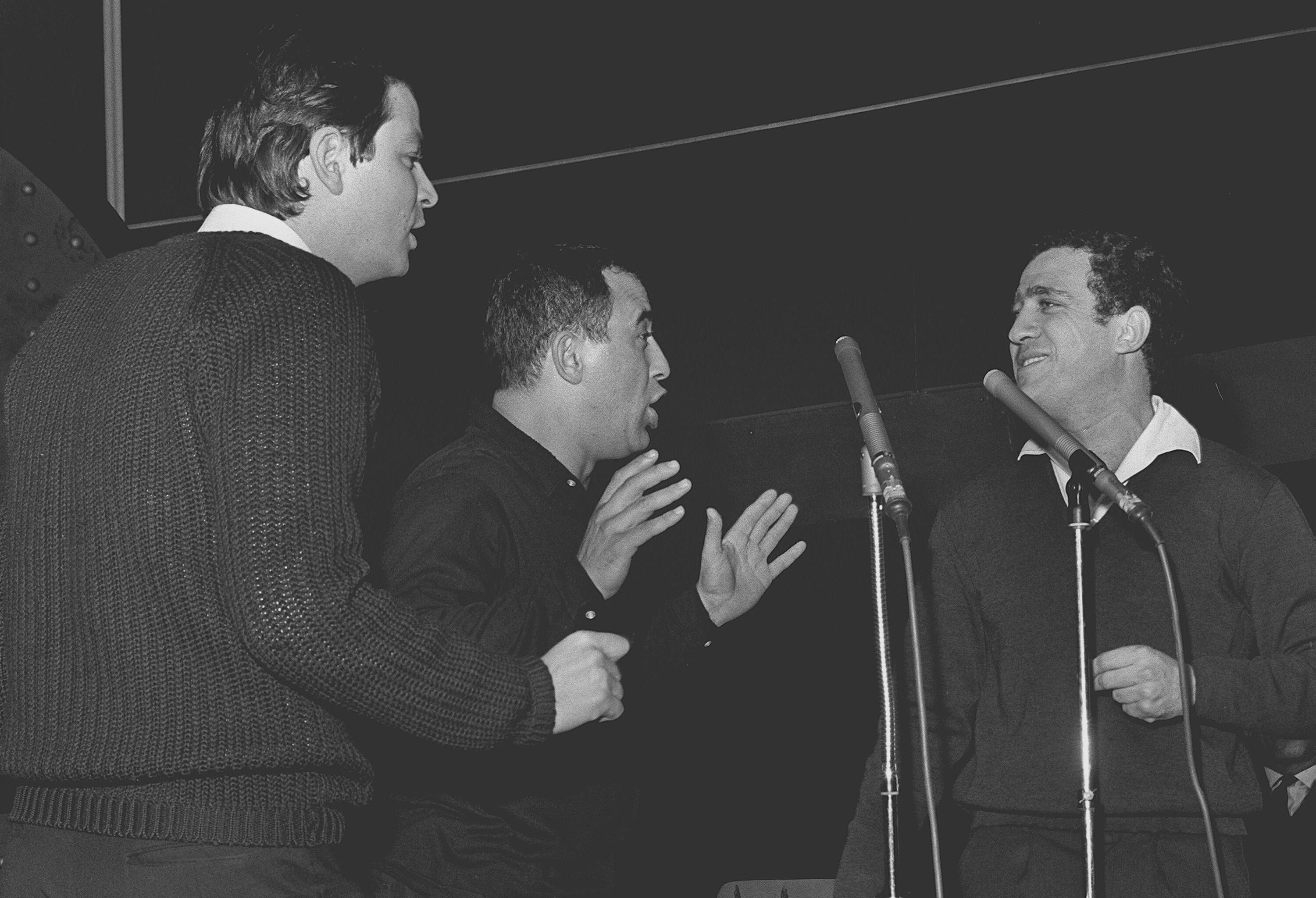
- Yarkon Bridge Trio performing in the Kinor David award ceremony, 1964

Background information
- Also known as: Shlishiyat Gesher HaYarkon
- Origin: Tel Aviv, Israel
- Genres: Israeli music
- Instrument: Vocal
- Years active: 1963–1966
- Labels: Israfon
- Past members: Benny Amdursky; Arik Einstein; Yehoram Gaon; Israel Guryon

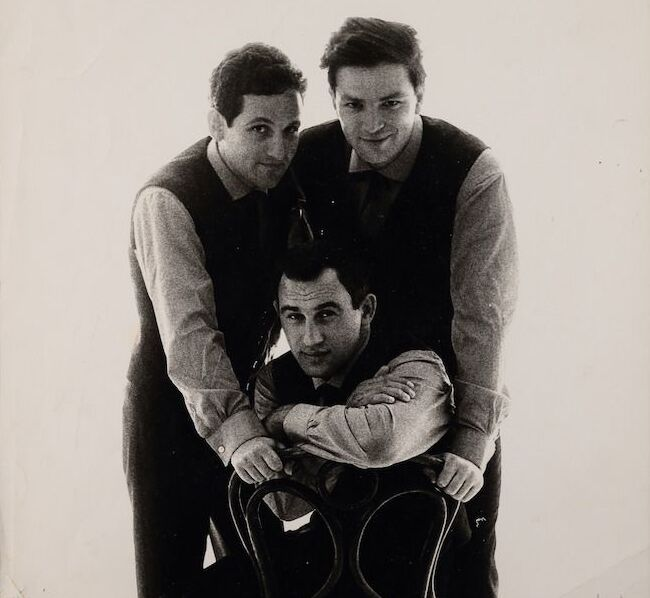
The trio in its second iteration, with Arik Einstein, Benny Amdursky and Israel Guryon. Yonathan Carmon - Alon Schmidt Archive, National Library of Israel

Yarkon Bridge Trio (Hebrew: שלישיית גשר הירקון), or The Yarkon Trio, was an Israeli vocal group which operated from 1963 to 1966.

== History ==
The group was established in 1963, when The Dudaim member Benny Amdursky drafted Arik Einstein, who was part of HaGafrurim duo, and Yehoram Gaon, who was a member of HaTarnegolim (The Roosters) to establish the trio. The group picked the name upon a suggestion from Einstein, after a bridge over the Yarkon River on the main road that connects the Tel Aviv city center and its northern neighborhoods.

During its early period the group performed several shows, which were met in little enthusiasm. In order to bolster the group's repertoire, the group and its producers, Dahn Ben-Amotz and Haim Hefer, contacted songwriter Naomi Shemer, who penned three new songs for the group, one of which, "Laila BeChof Achziv" (Night in Achziv Beach; Hebrew: לילה בחוף אכזיב), the group performed in the film Dalia And The Sailors, along with a parody of The Beatles' "Shake". The three group members also appeared as cast members in the film itself.

In April 1964, the trio sang the song "Otach" (You; Hebrew: אותך) in the 1964 Israel Song Festival. The trio released its first album, "Ahava Rishona" (First Love; Hebrew: אהבה ראשונה) in June 1964. While continuing its performances in Israel, the trio was invited to perform abroad, appearing in a BBC televised show. The trio returned to the Israel Song Festival in 1965, performing the song "HaGavi'a" (The Goblet; Hebrew: הגביע), which placed second in the competition.

In mid-1965 Gaon quit the group to focus on his solo career and was replaced by Dudaim member Israel Gurion, with whom the trio worked on a new revue. In August The trio was invited to perform in an Israel-themed show at the Paris Olympia, a performance which led to a two-album deal with French producer Eddie Barclay In September 1965 the trio released its second album, "HaTochnit HaChadasha" (The New Program; Hebrew: התכנית החדשה), following which the trio embarked on a tour in Europe. In January 1966 the trio voted best entertainment group for the Kinor David award.

In April 1966 the trio appeared once more in the Israel Song Festival and performed two songs, second-placed song "Rei'ach Tapu'ach Odem Shani" (Scent of Apple Redness of Crimson; Hebrew: ריח תפוח אודם שני) and "Bo'ee Yalda" (Come Girl; Hebrew: בואי ילדה). After the festival the trio disbanded, with Einstein resuming his solo career and Amdurski and Gurion continuing their work as The Dudaim duo.

In 1967, The Dudaim joined Einstein's new band, The High Windows, for a set of shows, setting a reunion of the second line-up of the trio, with Einstein joining Amdurski and Gurion on stage. In May 1968 The Dudaim celebrated ten years of activity with a show at Heichal HaTarbut in Tel Aviv. Towards the end of the show, which was also released as an album, Einstein joined The Dudaim on stage to perform the song "Krav Harel" (Battle of Harel; Hebrew: קרב הראל) from the trio's second album, and Gaon joined the trio to perform the final song of the show, with the line-up jokingly said to be The Yarkon Bridge Quartet. In 1991, singer Hanan Yovel, who sang with Amdurski in HaShlosharim trio, joined Amdurski and Gurion for a lineup that was named "Shlosharim al Gesher HaYarkin" (lit. The Shlosharim on the Yarkon Bridge), which performed songs by The Dudaim, HaShlosharim and Yarkon Bridge Trio. After Amdurski died, in 1994, Gurion and Yovel teamed with The Parvarim duo, which occasionally performed with the Dudaim since 1985, for a tribute show to Amdurski under the name "HaChaverim Shel Benny" (lit. Benny's Friends), which ran until 2015, performing songs from Amdurski's career, including the Yarkon Bridge Trio.

== Albums ==
=== Studio albums ===
- Ahava Rishona (Hebrew: אהבה ראשונה, lit. "First Love") - 1964
- HaTochnit HaChadasha (Hebrew: התכנית החדשה, lit. "The New Program") - 1965

=== Compilations ===
- The Collection (Hebrew: כל השירים, ההקלטות המקוריות, lit. "All Songs, The Original Recordings") - 2000
