= Miki Gavrielov =

Israeli composer

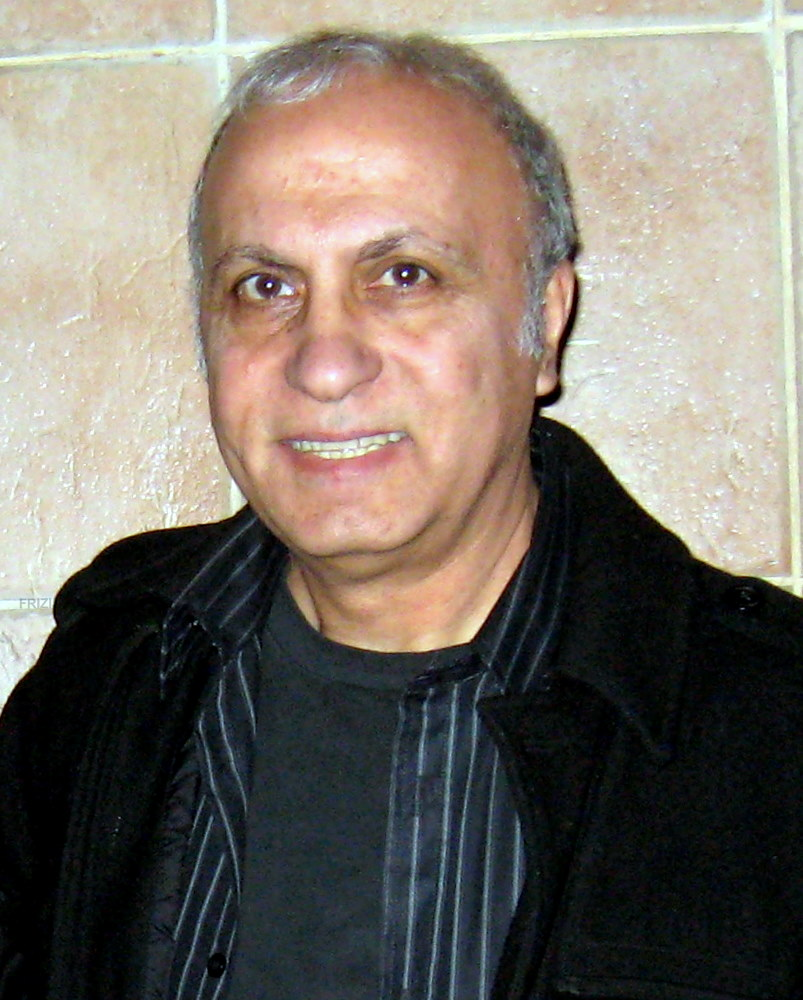
Miki Gavrielov

Michael "Miki" Gavrielov (Hebrew: מיכאל "מיקי" גבריאלוב; born 2 November 1949) is an Israeli composer and performer of folk/rock music. Born in Tel Aviv, his career spans many decades, beginning with being a member of rock group The Churchills. He is known for a long collaboration with Arik Einstein. Many of the most popular songs sung by Einstein were ones for which Miki Gavrielov wrote the music. Writing his own songs and performing on his own, Miki Gavrielov brought in influences from other Mediterranean countries, notably Turkey, from which some of his ancestors, Sephardic Jews originally from Spain, immigrated to Israel. Gavrielov has released at least 17 studio albums.

== Selected discography ==
- ספור של חורף 2000 "Winter Story"
