= Benjamin Tene =

Hebrew writer (1914–1999)

Benjamin Tene (Hebrew: בנימין טנא; 27 Kislev, 15 December 1914, Warsaw - 13 April 1999, Tel Aviv) was a Hebrew writer, poet, translator, editor and children's author.

== Early life ==
Benjamin Tene was born in Warsaw, Poland in 1914. His mother was secular and his father was a follower of an established family. Tene had two sisters. Tene studied at a cheder and in his youth, after the death of his mother, he joined the Hashomer Hatzair movement and began writing a diary and poems in Hebrew.

== Migration to Israel ==
He graduated from the Hebrew Gymnasium of the "Education" network in Warsaw. He was trained in salons and immigrated to Eretz Israel with the pioneers of Kibbutz Ayalon in 1937. He was one of the founders of the kibbutz and spent about ten years there. During World War II, Tene gave shelter to the Polish poet Wladyslaw Broniewski, who arrived in Israel with the Polish Andres army. Tanna knew Broniewski from Poland. His father and sister Sarah were murdered in the Holocaust.

== Return to Poland ==
In 1946 he traveled to Poland, as an emissary, to bring Jewish children to Eretz Israel who had been hidden in Christian monasteries during the Holocaust. Wladyslaw Broniewski was assisted in organizing the trip. He planned to stay in Poland for about two weeks, but stayed there for about a year and a half. During his mission he witnessed the dismal state of this Judaism after the great destruction and the hatred of Israel dripping among the anti-Semites among the Poles. The trip to Poland was a source of inspiration for his poem "Transcendence". His first translation from Yiddish was the book by partisan Rozka Korczak "Flames in the Ashes" - the first book of testimonies of the partisans.

== Return to Israel, successful writing career ==
Benjamin Tene devoted himself to editing the children's newspaper Mishmar for Children and was its editor for several decades. Wrote stories for children and teenagers about his childhood and adolescence in Warsaw, Poland before the Holocaust. Translated from Polish dozens of books, classics, modern literature, children's and youth literature. Yiddish has a prominent translation of Itzik Manger's poems. Some of Benjamin Tena's poems have been translated into foreign languages: English, Polish and Slovak. Tene collaborated with the illustrator Shmuel Katz. The two first met at Kibbutz Elon and Katz joined the Mishmar Leidim system as an illustrator in 1950. In 1970, he won the Alfred Juzikowski Foundation Prize from the United States for his translations from Polish. In 1975 he received the Wolf Prize for children's and youth literature for his book the Shade of the Chestnut Tree.

== Personal life ==
Tene lived with his wife Sarah (1915-2006) in Ramat Aviv. He had two children - Yael and Abraham. Binyamin Tene died in 1999 and was buried in the Kiryat Shaul Cemetery in Tel Aviv.

== Legacy ==
The Tel Aviv Municipality has set up a memorial plaque on his house at 8 Karni Street in Tel Aviv.
