= The High Windows (album) =

The High Windows החלונות הגבוהים

Studio album by the High Windows
- Released: April 1967
- Recorded: 1966–1967
- Studio: Kolinor Studios
- Genre: Pop rock
- Length: 33:36
- Language: Hebrew
- Label: Hed Arzi
- Producer: Benny Amdursky

Singles from The High Windows
- 1. "You Can't Go" Released: February 1967

The High Windows (Hebrew: החלונות הגבוהים, romanized: HaHalonot HaGvohim) is the only studio album by the Israeli pop rock group the High Windows, released in April 1967 on Hed Arzi Music.

Forming in late 1966, the High Windows initially had no intentions of recording a studio album, with their demos, which featured songs that were influenced by the style of bands such as the Beatles, the Mamas & the Papas, and the Turtles, being intended solely for their own amusement. The band later proceeded to record an album after listening to their demos, with the production being handled by former Yarkon Bridge Trio member, Benny Amdursky.

Following its release, the High Windows went on a tour of Israel and, later in late 1967 and early 1968, a tour of Europe, eventually re-recording two songs from the album in French.

While initially receiving mixed reception on account of its foreign-influenced musical style, The High Windows is today considered one of the first successful Israeli rock albums and a breakthrough in Israeli music. It has also frequently been ranked in publication listings of the greatest Israeli albums of all time.

== Background and songs ==
Not long after their formation in late 1966, the High Windows began recording demos of songs that band member Shmulik Kraus had composed. These demos were recorded in Kraus' apartment in Tel Aviv and were initially recorded for the band's own amusement, but after listening to them, they decided to record them in a recording studio. The album's recording was done at Kolinor Studios, and the album's production was overseen by Benny Amdursky, formerly of the Yarkon Bridge Trio. Arik Einstein helped compile the lyrics for the album's songs. The album's musical sound was influenced primarily by Anglo-American bands such as the Beatles, the Mamas & the Papas, and the Turtles. In particular, the vocal harmonies, which were initially arranged by Yehezkel Braun, were influenced by the Mamas & the Papas, as well as Peter, Paul and Mary.

Kraus's behavior during the recording sessions of the album has been described by several people involved with the album, including fellow band member and Kraus's then girlfriend Josie Katz, as hostile and demoralising. His behavior was cited by the album's vocal arranger, Yehezkel Braun, and the original drummer recruited for the album, Arale Kaminsky as being part of the reason why they quit the album and refused to take credit for their work. One such incident of Kraus' anger was during the recording sessions for "You Can't Go", which was the very first song recorded for the album, where Kraus, in a fit of anger, kicked bassist Emil Ram's amplifier. As part of a 2007 retrospective on the album in Makor Rishon, Katz claimed that she was treated as little more than an afterthought during the sessions of the album by both Einstein and Kraus, and that she was seldom consulted over the album's musical sound. The album's front cover is a photograph of the trio at a beach in Tel Aviv, and was taken by Einstein's then-wife, Alona Einstein.

"Ezekiel" (Hebrew: יחזקאל, romanized: Yeḥezḳel) is the opening song of the album and was written by Haim Hefer. The song caused some controversy after the album's release due to its depiction of the Prophet Ezekiel as a beatnik, leading to the song being banned from airplay by Kol Yisrael shortly after its release.

"You Can't Go" (Hebrew: אינך יכולה, romanized: Einech Yechola) is the second song on the album and was written by Yoram Taharlev. It was one of two songs offered to the band by Taharlev in what he labelled as a "secret meeting" between him, the band, the album's producer Benny Amdursky, and talent agent Avraham Deshe. The other song offered was "Wandering Birds", later performed by The Parvarim. Initially, it had a slower tempo arranged by Yehezkel Braun. The song is a love song featuring playful lyrics between a man and his girlfriend. It was released as a promotional single in February 1967, and was commercially successful, motivating Amdursky to get the band signed by Hed Arzi Music later that same month.

"Chocolate Soldier" (Hebrew: חייל שוקולד, romanized: Hayal Shokolat) is the third song on the album and was written by satirist Hanoch Levin. It is partially a parody of the children's song Come to Me, Nice Butterfly as well as an anti-war song criticising the militaristic culture of Israel. Due to its lyrics, it did not receive any radio airplay.

"Listen" (Hebrew: זמר נוגה, romanized: Zemer Nugeh) is a musical adaptation of a poem by Rachel Bluwstein. It remains the most popular adaptation of the poem, and due to its popularity, Naomi Shemer scrapped plans to make her own adaptation of it. In 2008, in honor of Israel's 60th anniversary, the song was ranked number one in Channel 2's list of the "60 Greatest Israeli Songs of All Time".

"The Doll Ze'heva" (Hebrew: בובה זהבה, romanized: Buba Ze'heva) is a musical adaptation of a children's poem by Miriam Yalan-Shteklis. Kraus was fond of the poem as a child, and after meeting Shteklis in 1966, he composed a musical adaptation of it. It is a children's song about a child who is afraid of the dark and was based on a real incident in Shteklis' childhood.

== Reception and legacy ==
The High Windows was released in April 1967 on Hed Arzi Music. Initial critical reception was mixed; critics criticized the album for its foreign-influenced sound and beatnik-like attitude. In his review of the album, Menashe Ravina, writing for Davar, criticised the album's music as having "no hint at all of the Israeli sound" and considered the music to most tracks to be little more than "your typical discothèque track". The album's opening song, "Ezekiel" also received a lot of criticism for its depiction of the Prophet Ezekiel, and was banned from airplay out of fears that it would offend religious Jews. Similarly, "Chocolate Soldier" also received little airplay because of its themes. Two months after the album's release, the Six-Day War occurred, leading to the band performing for soldiers in the Sinai Peninsula.

Following their performances in the Sinai, the High Windows toured throughout Israel to promote the album, and eventually they went on a tour of Europe throughout late 1967 and early 1968, performing in England, France, and Italy. During their tour, they re-recorded "Ezekiel" and "Chocolate Soldier" in French as "El El Israel" and "Soldat de Chocolat". Later, the High Windows teamed up with English producer Keith Mansfield and English musician Ralph Murphy to record two new songs in English titled "Maybe Someday" and "In Your Eyes", which were issued as a single by CBS Records International. After these sessions, the band broke up as Einstein was feeling homesick and Kraus accepted an offer to star in the film The Royal Hunt of the Sun. Not long after the band broke up, Einstein met Lehakat HaNahal member Shalom Hanoch in The High Windows nightclub, marking the start of their musical partnership.

The High Windows is considered one of the first successful Israeli rock albums, and is frequently ranked as one of the greatest Israeli albums of all time. It was reissued in 1989 by Hed Arzi Music on compact disc, which received positive reviews from critics. That same year, Israeli Army Radio editor Danny Karpel researched the influences of Western pop on Israeli music and concluded that The High Windows was "the first Hebrew pop record". In 2007, in honor of its 40th anniversary, Hed Arzi Music remastered the album, which went on to sell 40,000 copies in less than two weeks. In 2023, in a positive retrospective review of the album, music critic Yossi Hersonski called it "the first Israeli pop record" and wrote that "every song on the album is an inseparable part of Israeli music."

== Track listing ==
All music is composed by Shmulik Kraus.

Side one
No.	Title	Lyrics	Length
1.	"Ezekiel"	Haim Hefer	3:14
2.	"You Can't Go"	Yoram Taharlev	2:39
3.	"Chocolate Soldier"	Hanoch Levin	2:56
4.	"First Love"	Amos Kenan	2:47
5.	"Where Are They"	Haim Hefer	3:23
Total length:			14:59

Side two
No.	Title	Lyrics	Length
1.	"All Week Long"	Arik Einstein	3:02
2.	"Listen"	Rachel Bluwstein	2:33
3.	"Doll"	Miriam Yalan-Shteklis	3:19
4.	"So What"	Arik Einstein	3:26
5.	"Horoscope"	Haim Hefer	2:51
6.	"Little Girl"	Haim Hefer	3:16
Total length:			18:37 (33:36)

== Personnel ==
Credits taken from the album's liner notes.

Band members:

- Arik Einstein – vocals
- Shmulik Kraus – guitar, vocals, composing
- Josie Katz – vocals

Additional personnel:

- Zigi Skarbnik – piano, pipe organ, vocals
- Shmulik Arokh – bass guitar
- Zohar Levi – drums
- Benny Amdursky – production
