= We Left Slowly =

Israeli song

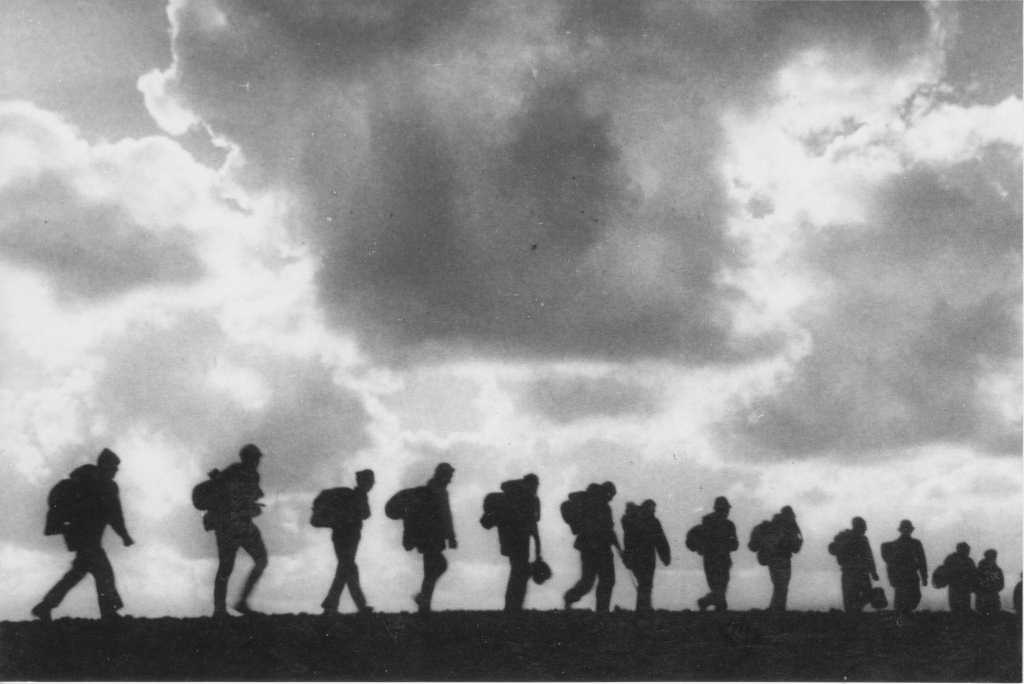
Palmach Company C (Pluga Gimel), 1943

"We Left Slowly" (Hebrew: יצאנו אט "Yatzanu at" or "Yatsanu at") is an Israeli song with verse of the poet and songwriter Haim Hefer (1946) and music by David Zehavi (1947). It was first publicly performed by the Chizbatron band in 1948. Its title comes from the first line. The song is a sad and quiet melody telling about a young Palmach fighter who is leaving his partner and they do not know whether they will see each other again. It has become popular in Israeli society and is customarily played on occasions of commemoration events related to the struggle for the establishment of the state of Israel.

The song was published in the newspaper Bema'ala, where it was noticed by Zehavi.

The song has been covered by many singers including Shoshana Damari (1968), Esther Ofarim (1961), Yafa Yarkoni (1964), Arik Einstein (1966, 1971 also on album Jasmine, 1972), Shlomo Artzi, Yishai Levi, Eyal Golan, and Danny Maseng.

Hebrew

יָצָאנוּ אַט, חִוֵּר הָיָה הַלַּיִל
בַּמֶּרְחַקִּים הִבְלִיחוּ הָאוֹרוֹת
וְאַתְּ הָיִית יָפָה כִּשְׁתֵּי עֵינַיִךְ
עֵת הַדְּמָעוֹת הָיוּ בָּן עֲצוּרוֹת.

Transliteration

Yatzanu at, chiver hayah halayil,
Bamerchakim hiv'lichu ha'orot.
Ve'at hayit yafa kishtey eynaich
Et hadma'ot hayu ban atzurot

English

We left slowly. The night was pale.
In the distance the lights flickered.
And you were all loveliness like your two eyes
With tears cupped in them.

Jazz journalist Dan Bilawsky describes the song as "a chill-inducing, mournful Israeli-standard ballad".

In 1974, a children's newspaper Talk to the Children (דבר לילדים, Devar Lebedim) published new lyrics to the song by a ten-and-a-half-year old boy Or Ezer (אור עזר), titled "Tear and Victory" (דמעה וניצחון, dim'a venitzchon) which starts with the words "Twenty-six years have passed".

== See also ==
- Hayu Zmanim
