= High Windows (disambiguation) =

High Windows may refer to:

- High Windows, a book first published in 1974 of a collection of poems by English poet Philip Larkin
- High Windows (poem), a poem by English poet Philip Larkin
- The High Windows, was an Israeli pop group active during the 1960s
- The High Windows (album), a self-titled album by the Israeli band, The High Windows
