= Hayu Zmanim =

Israeli song

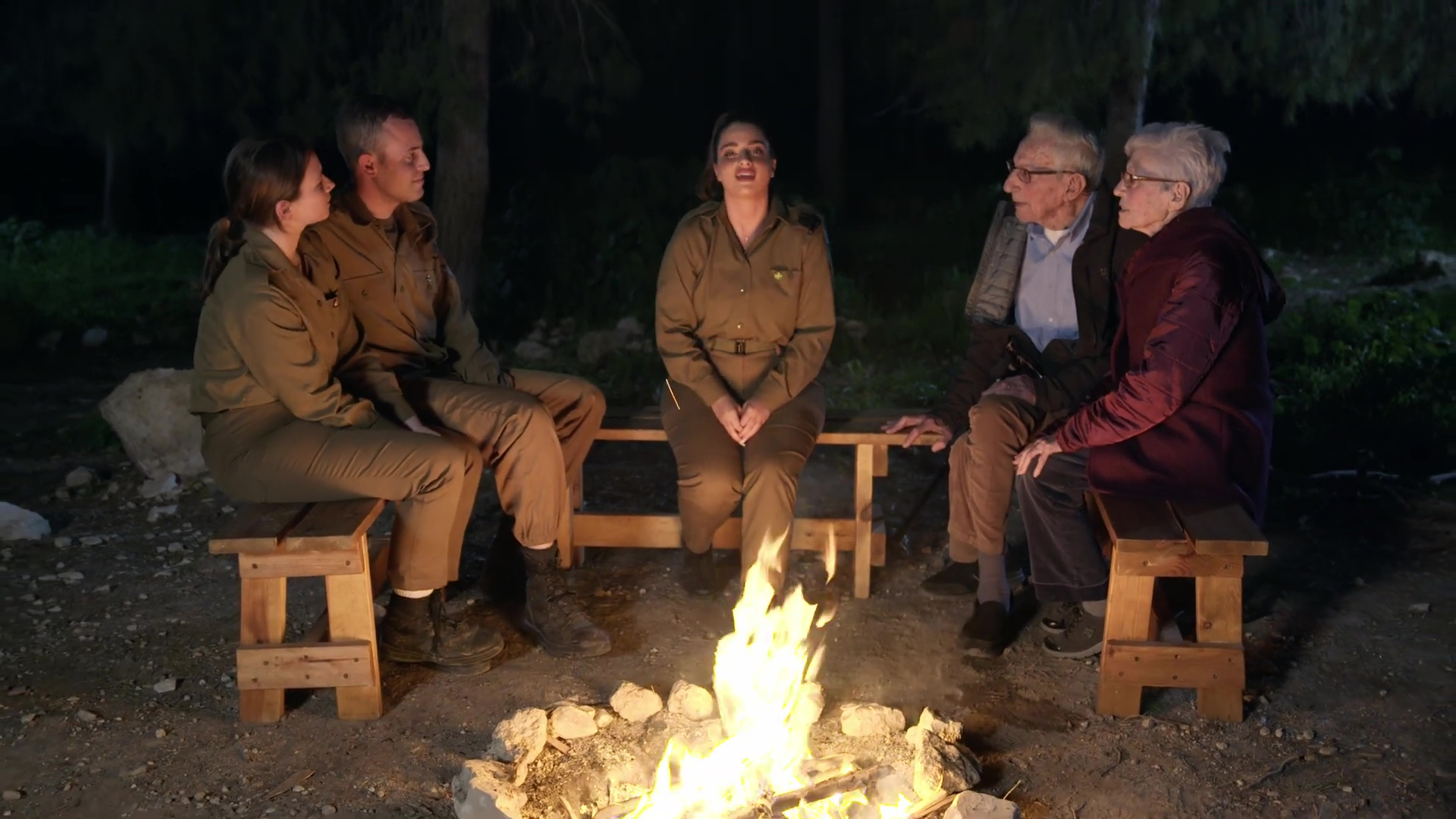
Hayu Zmanim performed by Noa Kirel in a music video honoring the 80th anniversary of Palmach

"Hayu Zmanim" (Hebrew: היו זמנים, literally 'There Were Times', sometimes translated as 'In Those Days') is a song with lyrics by Haim Hefer and music by Moshe Wilensky written in 1948. It was first performed by the Chizbatron band of Palmach.

== History ==
It was first published in Beshaar, the literary supplement of Al HaMishmar on July 22, 1948. Eli Eshed suggests that the song was inspired by a cartoon by Arieh Navon published in Davar on May 7, 1948, showing an old couple of Palmachniks telling tales to their grandson. Its first performance by Chizbatron with soloist Naomi Polani was on July 20.

Of early performers, Shoshana Damari was noted for performing and recording this song, as well as Yafa Yarkoni. Later it was performed by many others.

Initially the song was written as looking into the future: "The day will come and you will still sit by the fire, and your back will be bent like a hoe, and you will remember your days in Palmach and tell about it..." But as the time passed, it became a nostalgic song about the past.

In 1979, on the occasion of the Egypt–Israel peace treaty Hefer added two more stanzas.

== See also ==
- "We Left Slowly"
