= Hareut =

Hebrew poem and song

Hareut (Hebrew: הרעות; friendship, fellowship, etc., in English, here esp. camaraderie, brotherhood in arms) is a Hebrew poem written by Haim Gouri and set to music by Sasha Argov. The song was written a year after the outbreak of the 1948 Arab–Israeli War and commemorates those who fell in the war. The song is often performed at memorial ceremonies.

The song was originally performed by the Chizbatron with Gideon Singer as a soloist. Other well-known performances of the song have been by the Nahal Entertainment Troupe, and popular singers Shoshana Damari and Yehoram Gaon. Prior to Israel's 60th Independence Day, the song was elected by IDF soldiers on the Army Radio, as their favourite Hebrew song, ranking ahead of the popular Jerusalem of Gold. The song was highly ranked in other competitions.

The song represents the social ideals of the period of the 1947–1949 Palestine war including one's sacrifice for the homeland, the individual's concern for all, and the sanctity of the memory of the fallen.

== Lyrics ==
=== Original === הרעות על הנגב יורד ליל הסתיו ומצית כוכבים חרש חרש עת הרוח עובר על הסף עננים מהלכים על הדרך. כבר שנה לא הרגשנו כמעט איך עברו הזמנים בשדותינו כבר שנה ונותרנו מעט מה רבים שאינם כבר בינינו. אך נזכור את כולם את יפי הבלורית והתואר כי רעות שכזאת לעולם לא תיתן את ליבנו לשכוח אהבה מקודשת בדם את תשובי בינינו לפרוח. הרעות נשאנוך בלי מילים אפורה עקשנית ושותקת מלילות האימה הגדולים את נותרת בהירה ודולקת. הרעות כנערייך כולם שוב בשמך נחייך ונלכה כי רעים שנפלו על חרבם את חייך הותירו לזכר. ונזכור את כולם...	=== English translation === The friendship An autumn night descends on the Negev And gently, gently lights up the stars While the wind blows on the threshold Clouds go on their way. Already a year, and we almost didn’t notice How the time has passed in our fields Already a year, and few of us remain So many are no longer among us. But we'll remember them all The elegant, the handsome Because friendship like this will never Permit our hearts to forget Love sanctified with blood will once more bloom among us Friendship, we bear you with no words Gray, stubborn and silent Of the nights of great terror You remained bright and lit Friendship, as did all your youths Again in your name we will smile and go foreword Because friends that have fallen on their swords Left your life as a monument And we'll remember them all…
