= The High Windows =

1960s Israeli pop-rock trio

The High Windows החלונות הגבוהים
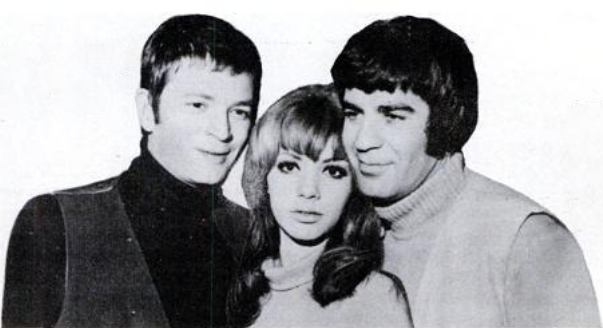
- From left to right: Arik Einstein, Josie Katz, and Shmulik Kraus

Background information
- Also known as: HaChalonot HaGvohim החלונות הגבוהים
- Origin: Tel Aviv, Israel
- Genres: Israeli pop, Israeli rock
- Years active: 1966–1968 (original lineup); 1973–1974 (second lineup)
- Label: Hed Artzi
- Past members: Arik Einstein; Josie Katz; Shmulik Kraus; Eli Magen (1973-1974 only)

The High Windows (Hebrew: החלונות הגבוהים, romanized: HaHalonot HaGvohim) were an Israeli musical group active from 1966–1968, and later, 1973–1974.

Formed by Arik Einstein, Shmulik Kraus, and Josie Katz in late 1966, The High Windows performed in clubs throughout Israel with a style influenced by Anglo-American bands such as the Beatles. They opened their own club named The High Windows in 1967, which was also the year that they peaked in popularity.

That same year, they released their only studio album titled The High Windows, which has been frequently regarded as one of the greatest and most influential albums in the history of Israeli music. After its release, the band embarked on a tour of Europe, including performances in England, France, and Italy. Despite the success, the band broke up in early 1968, with Einstein returning to his solo career afterwards. In 1973, the band reformed with a new line up featuring Eli Magen as Einstein's replacement, however this lineup was short-lived and the band broke up again in 1974.

Today, the High Windows are commonly regarded as one of the first modern Israeli pop and Israeli rock bands, paving the way for bands such as the Churchills and Kaveret.

== History ==
The High Windows formed after Arik Einstein visited Josie Katz and Shmulik Kraus's apartment in late 1966. During the visit, the couple played some of Kraus' compositions to Einstein, who began singing random lyrics in response. Initially, the band intended to record songs for their own amusement, with the demos being recorded in the couple's apartment, but after listening to them, the band decided to record the songs in a recording studio.

Not too long afterwards, they began work on what eventually became their only studio album, The High Windows, at Kolinor Studios. In early 1967, they opened their own club named The High Windows. Later, in April 1967, the band released The High Windows and then embarked on a national tour to promote the album. The album received mixed reception, with critics criticizing it for its Anglo-American-influenced sound.

The album featured 11 songs, all of which were composed by Kraus, with the lyrics either being provided by songwriters such as Haim Hefer, Yoram Taharlev, Hanoch Levin, Amos Kenan, and Einstein, or being musical adaptations of existing poems by Miriam Yalan-Shteklis and Rachel Bluwstein.

Following the Six-Day War in June 1967, they toured in France and re-recorded two of their songs in French as "El El Israel" (Ezekiel) and "Soldat De Chocolat" (Chocolate Soldier). After the success of their French performances, the band went to London to record two new songs in English. The lyrics were provided by Ralph Murphy, while the production was done by Keith Mansfield. The two songs were "Maybe Someday" and "Your Eyes", which were issued as a single on CBS Records International in 1968. However, Einstein felt homesick and was not interested in pursuing an international career, and Kraus accepted an offer to star in the film The Royal Hunt of the Sun, leading to the band's breakup that same year. Upon his return to Israel, Einstein began work on his next solo album titled Capricorn.

In 1973, the band reformed under a new lineup featuring Eli Magen as the replacement for Einstein, launching a new musical program with songs written by Shalom Hanoch, Yaakov Rotblit, Haim Hefer and Kraus himself. However, this lineup was short-lived and the band broke up yet again in 1974.

== Legacy ==
The High Windows are today regarded as one of the first Israeli rock bands as well as one of the first modern Israeli pop bands. Their musical style is believed to have deviated from the musical style of military ensembles such as Lehakat HaNahal or Lehakat Pikud Merkaz or civilian groups such as the Yarkon Bridge Trio or HaTarnegolim, and in doing so, their style paved the way for bands like Kaveret and The Churchills. Their lone studio album, The High Windows, is today frequently ranked as one of the greatest Israeli albums of all time. In 2007, it was remastered by Hed Arzi Music and sold 40,000 copies in less than two weeks. In February 2018, Assaf Amdursky, Shlomi Shaban, and Shmulik Kraus' niece, Yael Kraus started a tribute show dedicated to the High Windows' music.

== Band members ==
Original lineup (1966-1968):

- Arik Einstein – vocals
- Josie Katz – vocals
- Shmulik Kraus – guitar, vocals

Second lineup (1973-1974):

- Eli Magen – vocals
- Josie Katz – vocals
- Shmulik Kraus – guitar, vocals

== Discography ==
- The High Windows (1967)
