= The 81st Blow =

1974 film

- Directed by: David Bergman; Jacques "Jacquo" Ehrlich; Haim Gouri
- Written by: Haim Gouri
- Produced by: David Bergman; Jacques Ehrlich; Haim Gouri; Beit Lohamei HaGhettaot
- Edited by: Jacques Ehrlich
- Production company: Ghetto Fighters' House
- Release date: 1974
- Running time: 115 minutes
- Country: Israel
- Languages: Yiddish; Hebrew

The 81st Blow (Hebrew: המכה ה-81 and also known as The Eighty-First Blow) is a 1974 Israeli documentary film directed by Haim Gouri, Jacques Ehrlich, and David Bergman.

The film chronicles Adolf Hitler and the Nazis' rise to power, the persecution and destruction of Jews during the Holocaust, and the lasting effects on the survivors.

It uses archival footage to depict these events, with survivor testimonies heard in the soundtrack but their faces not shown on screen.

The title "The 81st Blow" comes from the testimony of Michael (Miki) Goldman, a Holocaust survivor and former police officer who served as an assistant to Gideon Hausner, Israel's Attorney General and the prosecutor in the Eichmann trial.

During the trial, Dr. Buzminski, a dentist from the Pszemysl ghetto, testified about a Jewish boy who received 80 lashes from a Nazi officer. It was later revealed that this boy was Goldman himself. Goldman later referred to the "81st blow" as the reaction of people after the war, who couldn't believe his story or turned away from Holocaust survivors.

The film was nominated for an Academy Award for Best Documentary Feature in 1975, making it a significant contribution to Holocaust cinema.

The 81st Blow is the first film in the Israeli Holocaust Trilogy by Bergman, Ehrlich and Gouri. It was followed by The Last Sea (1984) and Flames in the Ashes (1985).

== Plot ==
The plot of The 81st Blow centers on the experiences of Holocaust survivors and the atrocities committed under Nazi rule, depicted through a combination of survivor testimonies, archival footage, and historical context.

The film uses the 1961 Adolf Eichmann trial as a key narrative device, presenting survivors’ accounts of their suffering during the Holocaust.

The documentary does not follow a linear story but instead weaves together personal stories and broader historical events to provide a powerful commentary on memory, justice, and the weight of surviving an unimaginable past.

== Additional details ==
The film was produced by Beit Lohamei HaGhettaot (Ghetto Fighters' House), a museum dedicated to Holocaust remembrance. This collaboration underscored its aim of preserving history and educating future generations. The trilogy as a whole examines survival, resilience, and the scars left by the Holocaust on individuals and society
