= Josie Katz =

Israeli musical artist

Josie Katz ג'וזי כץ
- Born: Josephine Marcia Katz; August 14, 1940 (age 86); Pittsburgh, Pennsylvania, United States
- Genres: Pop, Israeli rock
- Years active: 1960–
- Label: P%C
- Partner: Shmulik Kraus

Josie Katz (Hebrew: ג'וזי כץ; born August 14, 1940) is an Israeli singer, actress, dancer and painter who received the Bonei Zion Prize in 2021 for her contributions to arts and culture.

== Biography ==
Katz was born in Pittsburgh, Pennsylvania. She made Aliyah at age 19, and resided in the kibbutzim Gesher HaZiv and Urim. In the early sixties she moved to Tel Aviv.

== Career ==
In 1964 she met musician Shmulik Kraus, who later on became her partner and who inspired her to start singing. In the beginning of her career she sang mostly in English in different clubs, and Kraus would accompany her. The same year Katz recorded her first song in Hebrew, "Dona, Dona", arranged by Pisi Osrovitz and produced by Kraus.

In 1966 Katz, Kraus and Israeli singer Arik Einstein formed The High Windows. The group was very successful, and mixed pop music and rock elements in their songs. The group went on a tour in the United Kingdom, and Katz was the main soloist, among other reasons because she was singing in her mother tongue – English. Despite their success, The High Windows released only one album of the same name.

With the band's break-up in 1968, Katz released a song named "The Homeland's Birthday" (יום הולדת למולדת) which received a bad reaction, and then returned to the US with Kraus. In 1970 Katz returned to Israel to participate in Havurat Lul's television series, and later on in the movie Shablul directed by Boaz Davidson, along with Uri Zohar and Shalom Hanoch.

In 1997, after fifteen years in which she did not work as a singer, Katz participated in Nathan Cohen's album Road Station, in renewed recordings for songs by The Pure Souls.

In 1999 she returned to Israel after living in the US, and performed along with Hanan Yovel and Uzi Hitman in different concerts.

== Personal life ==
In 1982, after she suffered violent abuse by her partner Shmulik Kraus, she left Israel and moved to live in the United States with her two children, Ben and Shem. In the US she married David, a senior manager in a company owned by Donald Trump. In 1990, her husband was killed in a car accident while the couple were driving in separate cars, one following the other.

She returned to Israel in 1999 and has been battling cancer since 2020.

== Discography ==
- The High Windows (החלונות הגבוהים) (1967)
- The Good, the Bad and the Maiden (הטוב הרע והנערה) (1972)
- Alone Together and Alone Alone (לבד ביחד ולבד לבד) (1975)
- Listen (a collection) (התשמע קולי) (2000)
- Melting in Time (with Barak Weiss) (נמס בזמן) (2006)
- Carried by the Wind (cover) (עלה נישא ברוח) (2019)
- "And Now it's Good" (single) (ועכשיו כבר טוב) (2020)

== Filmography ==
- Shablul (שבלול-snail) (1970)
- Boys and Girls (השמלה) (1970)
- Take Off (התרוממות) (1970)
- The Great Telephone Robbery (שוד הטלפונים הגדול) (1972)
- Rocking Horse (סוסעץ) (1978)
- Naor's Friends (החברים של נאור) (2011)
