= Rocking Horse (film) =

- סוסעץ
- Directed by: Yaky Yosha
- Written by: Yaky Yosha; Yoel Kaminski; Shmulik Kraus; Yoram Kaniuk
- Produced by: Danny Shalem; Yaky Yosha
- Starring: Shmulik Kraus; Gdalia Besser; Arik Lavie; Miriam Bernstein-Cohen; Josie Katz; Levana Finkelstein
- Music by: Shmulik Kraus
- Distributed by: Yaky Yosha Ltd.
- Release date: 1978
- Running time: 90 minutes
- Country: Israel
- Language: Hebrew

Rocking Horse (in Hebrew: סוסעץ, sus'etz) is director Yaky Yosha's second feature made in 1978. It was the first film to represent Israel in the Directors’ Fortnight of the Cannes Film Festival. It also participated at Locarno, San-Francisco, Chicago and many other international festivals. Rocking Horse received the special judges' award and the best actor award at the Oxford, England, film festival.

== Plot ==
Ami Susetz, an Israeli artist, abandons his wife and daughter in New York, and comes back to his homeland after years of absence.

Susetz wishes to decipher his constant feeling of failure as a human being, as a family man, as an artist. His best friends were killed in the 1973 war, his paintings were burned, not without intent. He has no past and no future.

Back home Susetz reunites with his dying father, with his mother, who unsuccessfully tries to understand her son, and with a childhood friend, Ansberg, now a philosopher/homeless.

Ansberg has adopted unusual methods in order to bring love back to Tel-Aviv and expects "conscientious" Susetz to assist him in that. Susetz cannot be a "conscientious", or anything else for that matter, not before he resolves his own personal fate: who is he, why was he born, why does he live.

Ami Susetz decides to make a movie, about himself, his parents, his hometown Tel-Aviv, and about all that constitutes the puzzle we call human life. His movie fails in resolving the pattern but ironically becomes a commercial blockbuster. At the end of the day, the movie gets burned, just like the paintings, not without intent...
