= Kalaniyot =

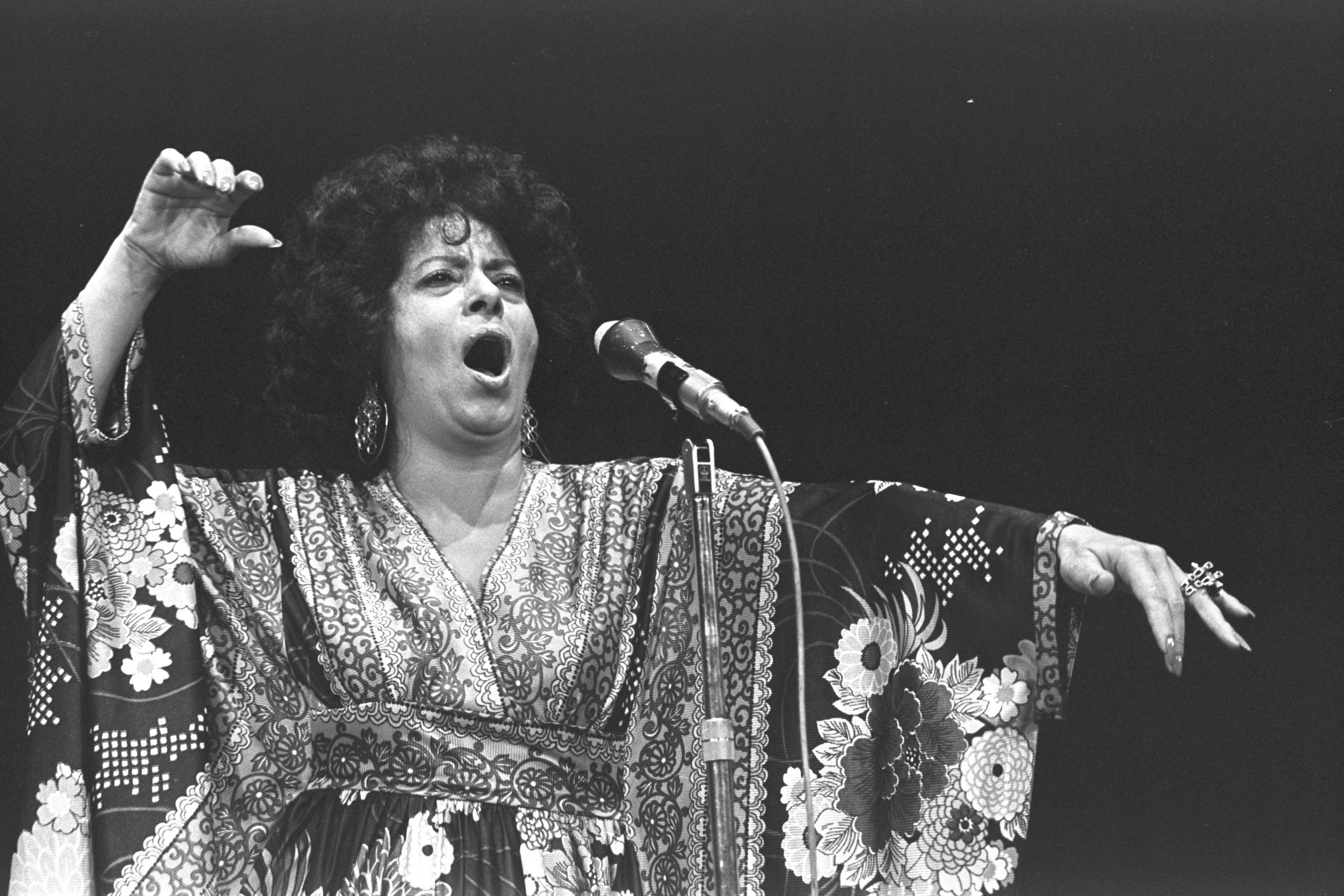
Shoshana Damari, who performed the most famous version of the song.

Kalaniyot (English: "anemones") is an Israeli song that became popular in the days leading up to the establishment of the State of Israel and has remained an Israeli classic.

The lyrics, by Nathan Alterman, paint the Anemones as a beauty that remains constant through a woman's life as she moves from girlhood, to maturity, to nostalgic old age. The music, by Israeli composer Moshe Vilensky, became one of his most famous melodies.

Although written as an ode to beauty, the song collided with the politics of Palestine under the British Mandate when the British 6th Airborne Division arrived to serve in an internal security role. The division wore red berets, which led them to acquire the nickname of "Anenomes" among the Jewish population who resented them. According to the account of a soldier who served there, the children would taunt members of the division by singing the chorus of the song at them.

The song was sung by Shoshana Damari. It was sung to her by family and friends when she was on her death bed.

== See also ==
- Music of Israel
- Culture of Israel
