= Gon Halevi =

Israeli musician, singer, composer, and conductor (b. 1993)

Gon Halevi גון הלוי
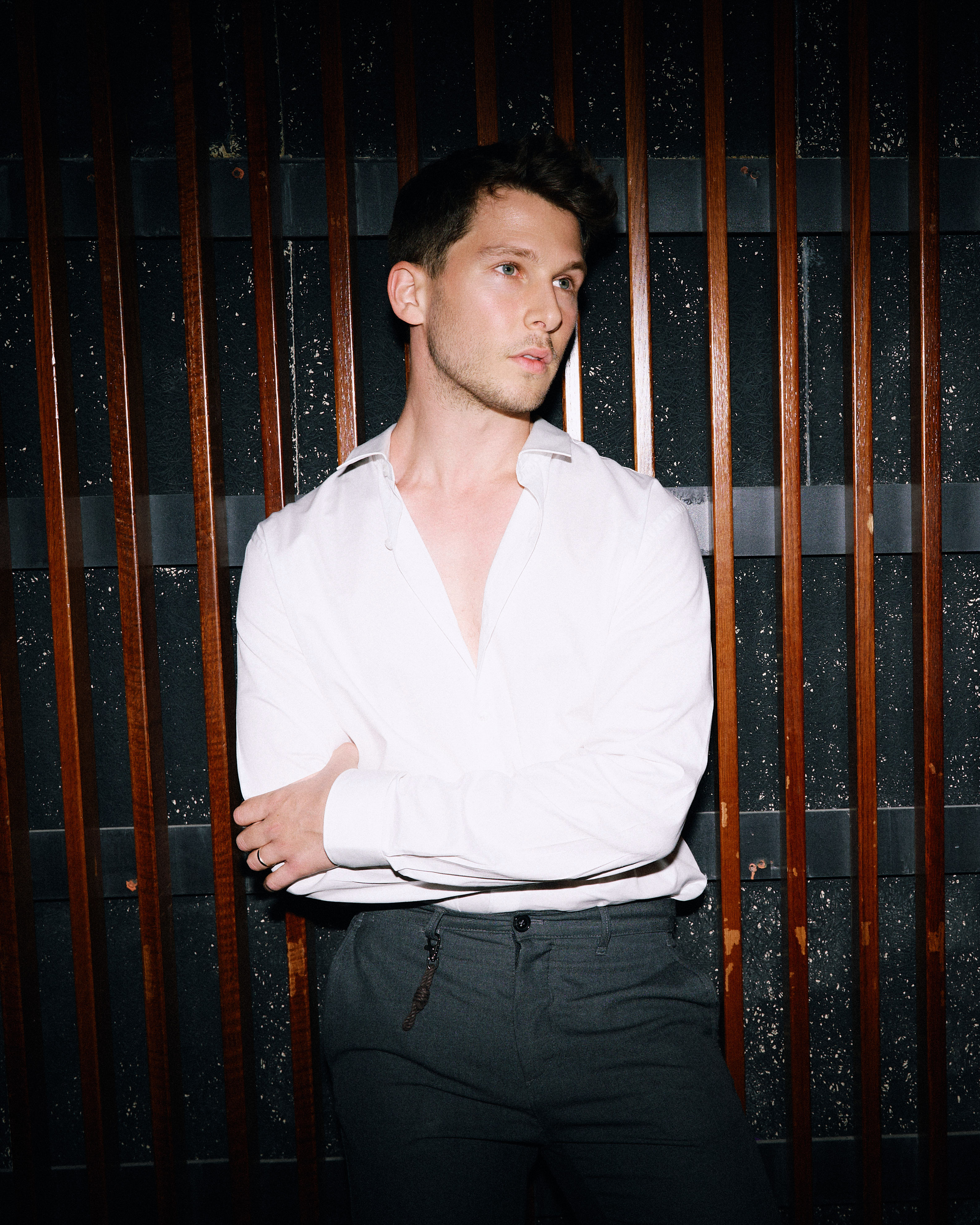

Background information
- Born: March 16, 1993 (age 33); Ra’anana, Israel
- Genres: Orchestral pop, cinematic pop, classical crossover, Pop, neo-classical
- Occupations: Musician, composer, pianist, singer
- Years active: 2008–present
- Website: gon-zone.com

Gon Halevi (Hebrew: גון הלוי) is an Israeli musician, pianist, composer, opera singer, and conductor. His work often merges classical and modern musical styles, and is known for his orchestral interpretations of well-known pieces. In addition to his musical career, Halevi is involved as a tutor in therapeutic music programs that aim to facilitate emotional healing.

== Early life and education ==
Gon Halevi was born in Ra’anana, Israel, and grew up in a creative household influenced by his family's architectural background. He started piano lessons at the age of six and later attended the Thelma Yellin High School of Arts, where he majored in theater.

After graduating from Thelma Yellin, Halevi performed in a stage production of The Sound of Music, performing alongside actress Ania Bukstein. He continued his education by pursuing operatic training at the Mannes School of Music in New York City, where he adopted a distinctive style combining classical and contemporary musical elements.

== Musical career ==
=== Micha’el, A Temporary Name (מיכאל, שם זמני) ===
Micha’el, A Temporary Name is a comedic musical-theatre production by Halevi that addresses themes of identity, trauma, and loss. Combining operatic elements with minimalist staging and church-inspired musical arrangements, the production was praised by Israel Hayom for its creative approach to exploring personal and collective memory.

=== Childhood Soundtrack (פסקול ילדות) ===
Childhood Soundtrack is a concert in which Halevi reimagines iconic Israeli songs by artists such as Yehonatan Geffen and Yoni Rechter, performed with a grand piano and string orchestra. The concert was described as an "effort to bridge past and present, offering a fresh perspective on familiar pieces while honoring their original essence". During a special concert In Tel Aviv Performing Arts Center, Gon featured a guest appearance by Israeli singer Nurit Galron, whom Halevi introduced as "the soundtrack of my childhood." The performance also included a tribute to composer Yoni Rechter – who was present in the audience – further underscoring "the concert’s blend of personal homage and national musical heritage."

=== Blackbird (ציפור שחורה) ===
Blackbird is a project where Halevi reimagines The Beatles' songs, incorporating virtuosic piano, different vocal styles, and chamber string ensemble. This project includes an interpretation of "Let It Be" merged with Naomi Shemer's "Lu Yehi (לו יהי), which was described as "blending western and Israeli musical traditions."

=== HE / היא ===
HE / היא (She in Hebrew) is a choral music project reinterpreting songs by prominent Israeli composer Sasha Argov. Featuring modern arrangements, the project explores gender roles in Israeli music through a contemporary lens. Years prior to this musical project, Halevi collaborated with singer Roni Ginosar to produce an album featuring piano arrangements of Argov's works named "כשאור דולק בחלונך״.

== Therapeutic music work ==
Halevi actively participates in music therapy, serving as a vocal coach for the Soul Key (מפתח סול) program at the Israeli Conservatory of Music in Tel Aviv. This program supports combat trauma survivors with PTSD, using music and singing as therapeutic tools in a low-light environment described by Halevi as a "musical mindfulness journey."

== List of works ==
- Micha’el, A Temporary Name (מיכאל, שם זמני) – A musical-theatrical production.
- Childhood Soundtrack (פסקול ילדות) – A cinematic orchestral compositions reinterpretation of Israeli classics.
- BlackBird (ציפור שחורה) – Reimagining of the Beatles’ songs with cinematic orchestral arrangements
- HE / היא – A choral project on the works of Sasha Argov.
- Diagonal Fields – His debut full-length album.
