= HaSela haAdom =

1958 Israeli song

"HaSela HaAdom"
- Vinyl radio record of the song with a sticker that reads "Banned from airplay!".

Single by Arie Lavie
- English title: The Red Rock
- Released: 1958
- Genre: Israeli folk
- Composer: Yochanan Zarai
- Lyricist: Haim Hefer

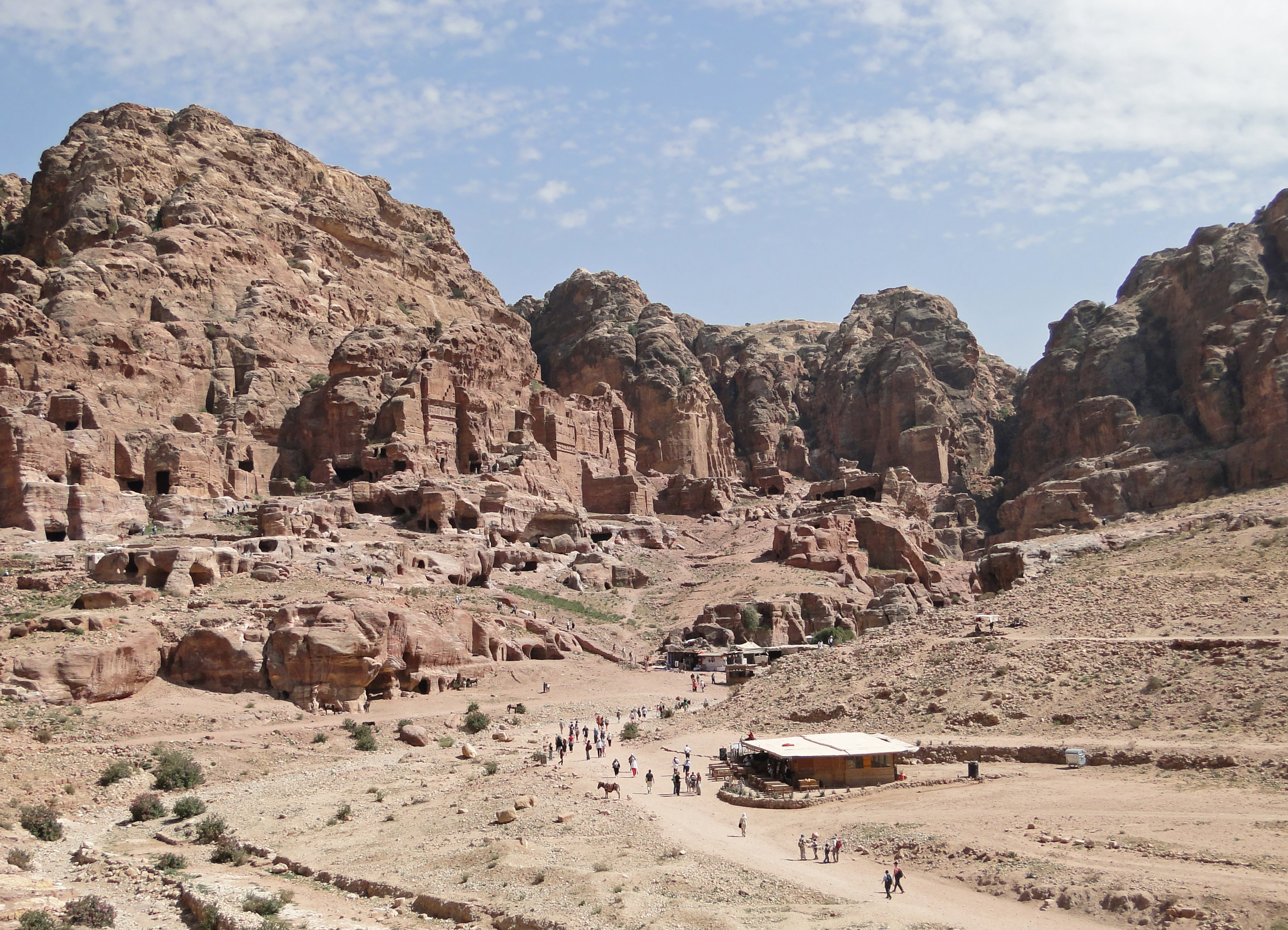
View of Petra

"HaSela haAdom" (Hebrew: הסלע האדום, lit. 'The Red Rock') is an Israeli song written by Haim Hefer, with music by Yochanan Zarai, recorded by Arik Lavie in 1958. The song tells the story of a young Israeli soldier who illegally crossed the Israel-Jordan border to visit Petra, and ends with the death of its hero. Hefer was inspired by a popular tradition of Israeli youth of hiking to Petra, many of them killed by Jordanian soldiers. The song became so popular among the youth that the government banned it for many years, for fear it would inspire further dangerous hikes. Hefer's song was familiar to all Israelis, and many authors incorporate it into their books and songs.

== Background ==
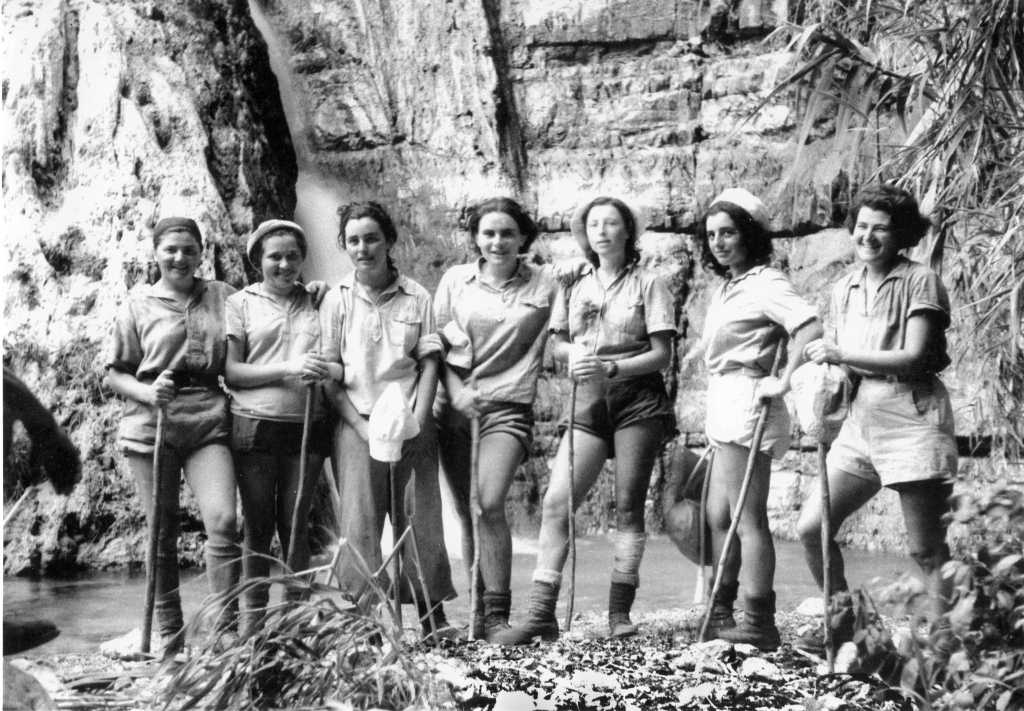
Group of Palmach girls on a hike

Hiking across the land of Israel started as part of the Zionist youth movement, and was especially popular among the Palmach. It was seen as a thing sabras, non-immigrant Israelis, should do. They toured the whole new-born country, often going through the desert, along the coast and the Egyptian and Jordanian borders. The hikers had a saying, "Next year in Petra", (Note: An analogy with the slogan "Next year in Jerusalem".) the site called "the trek of treks". Meir Har-Zion, often called a "mythological army hero", "fulfilled this oath" and travelled to Petra with his girlfriend, Rachel Savorai (also from Palmach), in 1953. Dominik Peters described their trip: "They hitchhiked southwards in Israel, crossed the border, took four bottles of water, some juice, food for two nights and one day, as well as a compass, a map, and a loaded rifle with them [...] Once Meir Har-Zion and Rachel Savorai, the first kovshim ("conquerors") of the sandy and stony soil, returned safe and sound, three men and two women decided after a Palmach reunion to follow their example." After publication of Har-Zion's book, Pirkei Yoman (Chapters of a Diary), such trips became very popular among young Israelis. This first group who decided to reach Petra after Har-Zion and Savorai were Arik Meger, Miriam Monderer, Eitan Minz, Ya'acov Kleifeld, and Gila Ben-Akiva. They did not succeed: Minz was bitten by a snake, and when they tried to return to Israel, they were killed by Jordanian soldiers. Later, in 1956, Dror Levi and Dimitri Berman of the 890th Battalion tried to reach Petra; Berman was wounded and Levi was killed. In 1957, six more Israelis were killed when they tried that trek.

Yigal Schwartz writes that in the 1950s "the Red Rock functioned as a magical place on the map of the Israeli national imagination, the product of an ancient civilisation, the secret of whose charm also lay, without a doubt, in the fact that it was a dangerous site".

== Song ==
First and last stanzas of
"The Red Rock" in English

Beyond the Edam Hills and far away
A rock, a red, red rock is said to lie;
So beautiful, and yet the legends say
That anyone who looks at it will die.
Oh, rock of evil fame, red as flame...
[...]
Beside the rock a silent sniper lay,
His flashing gun lit up the desert skies;
And three still figures at the break of day
Lay staring at the rock with sightless eyes.
Oh, three so cold and dead, cold and dead.

HaSela HaAdom, inspired by Har-Zion and the Petra hiking by Israelis, was written by Haim Hefer, with music by Yochanan Zarai, and recorded by Arik Lavie in 1958. Songwriter Haim Hefer was himself a member of Palmach; he "created with his songs a soundtrack for the young state of Israel, 'the karaoke of the 1960s', a 'collective linguistic DNA'".

The song was very popular, it "glorified the danger of hikes to Petra"; to discourage the youth, David Ben-Gurion banned the song from the radio. As a result, "forbidden song about forbidden city" became even more popular.

== Legacy ==
Stanzas of Dana International's
"Going to Petra" in English

There lies down a moon in red.
All the rocks are in the colour of blood.
Going to Petra
There the body is simmering in madness
The hallucinations are about to fly
...
There, your lips kiss tranquility.
The drums of passion are beating rapidly.
Going to Petra.
I shall cross a river, and dive into the desert.
Like a wild tiger, a night in the desert.

Almost all Israelis were familiar with the song, Petra was featured later in many books and songs. Among them is a book by Amos Oz, A Perfect Peace, written in 1982, that tells a story of young kibbutznik dissatisfied with his life, who leaves his wife and home and heads to Petra where "[t]here lay[s] the Land of Edom. The Kingdom of Transjordan. The city half as old as time. The enemy's home." This is a reference to the first stanza of Hefer's song. Another example is a short story by Ruth Almog, titled "Susim" ("Horses"), about a young man, Oscar, who made aliyah with his mother after surviving in the Holocaust. He served in the army, but when he heard about the Petra hike, his sabra-friend told him that "Petra is not for soaps" (soap ("sabon" in Hebrew) was a derogatory nickname for immigrant-Israelis who survived the Holocaust (Note: The nickname 'soap' was in reference to the myth about soap made from human corpses by the Nazis during the Holocaust (see also "Holocaust humor"), combined with the assertion of the lack of fighting will of the Holocaust victims).

Another example of the song's legacy is Dana International's song from her 1994 album Umpatampa, titled "Nosa'at le-Petra" ("Going to Petra"), written by Yoav Ginai. By incorporating the Petra theme, Dana International—transsexual singer and LGBTQ advocate,—showed that Hefer's words were still known to Israelis; she "criticizes the nationalistic myth, sexualizes it with metaphors not appearing in the original version, and satirizes the nature-loving Palmach language of Haim Hefer, which was in favor of powerful full moons". Dana's song was called a "political-sexual parody".
