= Arik Lavie =

Israeli musical artist

Arik Lavie אריק לביא
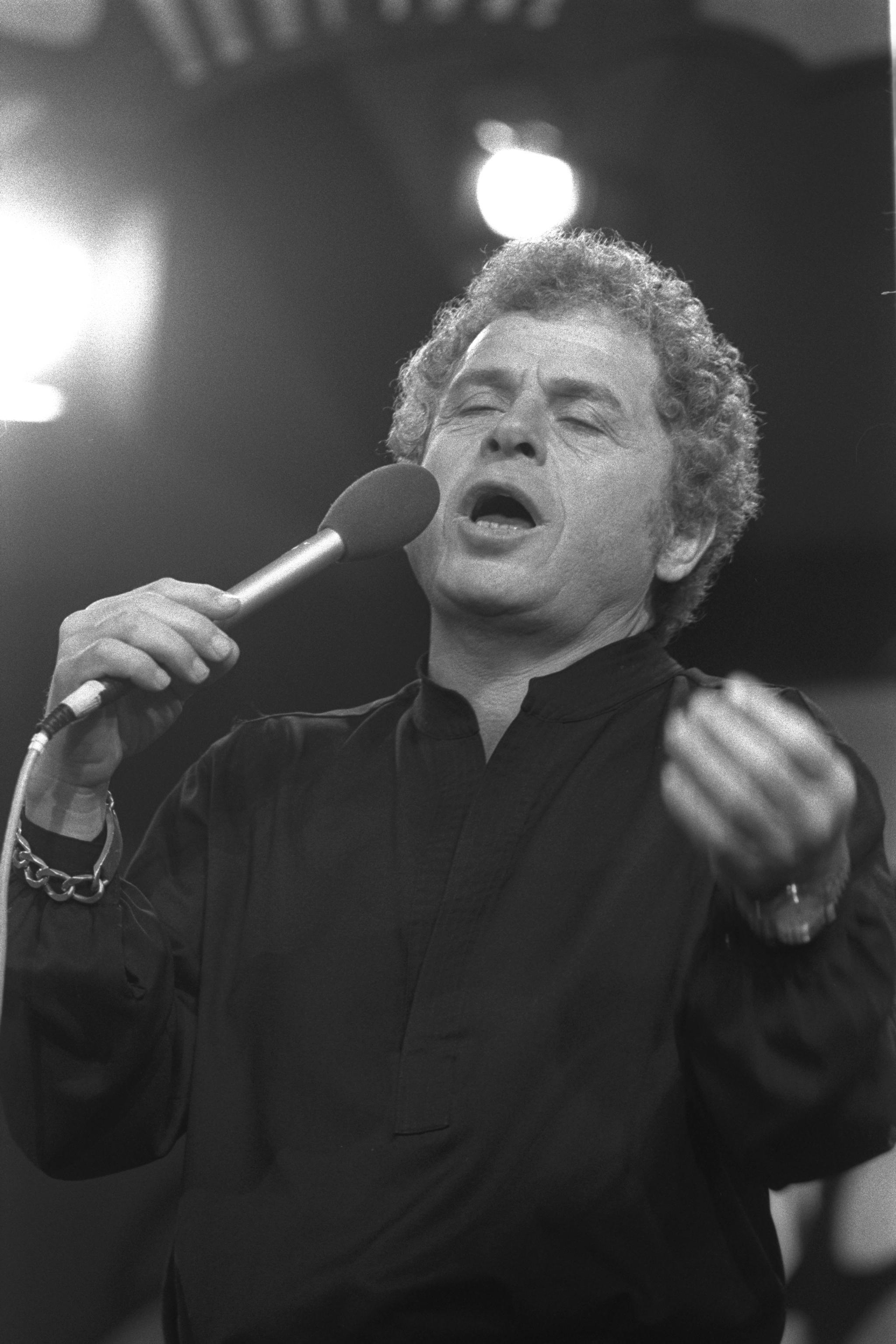
- Lavi performing at a fundraising event in Tel Aviv in 1981

Background information
- Born: Leo Alexander Hauven; 9 March 1927; Erfurt, Weimar Republic
- Died: 29 June 2004 (aged 77) Petah Tikva, Israel
- Genres: Israeli music; Pop music
- Occupations: Singer; actor
- Instrument: Vocals
- Years active: 1946–2004
- Labels: Hed Arzi Music; NMC Music

Arieh "Arik" Lavie (Hebrew: אריק לביא; 9 March 1927 – 29 June 2004) was an Israeli pop-rock-folk singer and actor.

== Early life ==
Lavie was born to a Jewish single mother named Edith Hauben who gave birth to him at the age of 19. His father was a medical student from Riga who left him and his mother before he was born. His mother married a man named Frank Inselsbacher of the French Foreign Legion and he gave him his surname. In 1936, accompanied by distant relatives, he emigrated from Germany to Kfar Baruch in Mandatory Palestine at the age of 9. His career began in 1945 in the Palmach military band. In 1947 he joined the "Carmel" band. His extensive stage career, spanning decades, began in the 1950s. He acted in the Cameri Theater and sang together with "The Three Strings", which specialized in shepherds' songs. During his career he recorded hundreds of songs, appeared on stage and played in musicals and films. He participated in many theater plays, several movies (e.g. Hill 24 Doesn't Answer, Operation Thunderbolt, Rocking Horse, Hole in the Moon), and published a number of solo and non-solo albums (e.g. The Arava Trio). He was occasionally seen on primetime Israeli television in the days it had only one channel.

== Career ==
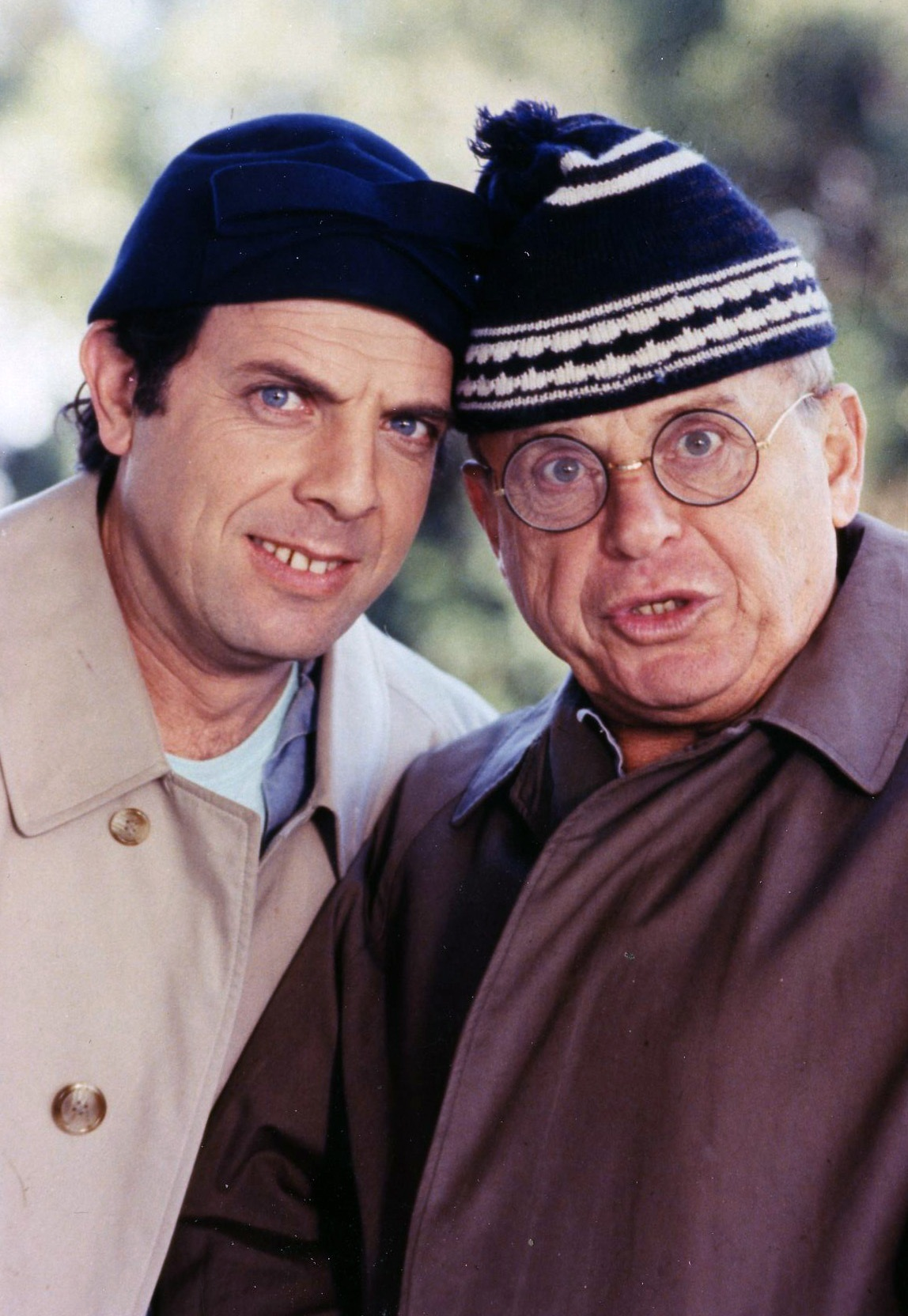
Lavie (right) and Sefi Rivlin, shot for the film The Great Madness

Lavie had a very rich voice that allowed his band members to play simple musical roles and spend very little time on rehearsals. Thus, Lavie could give many concerts in the young state of Israel, when it had a small, poor population.

In addition to Israeli folk music, Lavi was one of the first Israeli singers began to sing pop songs. His romantic song The Red Rock (HaSela haAdom) was about Petra, the ancient Jordanian city. Popular in the 1960s (well before Israel and Jordan had a peace treaty), the song encouraged young Israelis to sneak across the guarded border into Jordan to see the site, resulting in some deaths. James A. Michener fictionalized such a pilgrimage in the novel The Drifters. Among his famous songs are: "Song of the Locomotive", "Echo Song," "Autumn Song" ("All the rivers run into the sea"), "It happens", "old tune", "I'll sing you a song" and more. Lavie also renewed old Hebrew songs, including songs of the Palmach, in his album "The Moon and Sixpence".

Lavie appeared many times before soldiers during the wars of Israel. During the somber "waiting period" before the Six-Day War, he helped lift the national spirit by performing the song "Nasser's waiting for Rabin" with lyrics by Haim Hefer. After the war, he recorded the song "We will not go again" ("Rachel Rai Rai"), expressing the great sense of victory in the war. After the Yom Kippur War, he recorded the "Song is not just words" and during the Lebanon war, he recorded the "Knight", both songs of protest against war and in support of peace.

He participated in theater productions along with his wife, actress Shoshik Shani, and both played in movies. Arik Lavie is considered one of the finest performers in Hebrew. In recent years has been recognized even by singers and young artists, who renewed many of his songs. Lavie's last cinematic roll was in "Prophet on the run" directed by Tomer Ganihar.

His last album was "Arik Lavie - My Way: Rare Recordings". The album contains rare recordings from the '70s, which Lavi edited before his death in 2004. Its theme song is a Hebrew version of the song "My Way" by Frank Sinatra, translated according to Lavie's personal life story.

== Death and commemoration ==
He died in Petah Tikva on 29 June 2004 from a severe heart disease at the age of 77. He was buried at Yarkon Cemetery. He survived by his wife Shoshik, and two daughters.

The College of Music and Production BPM, provides a scholarship in his name, to commemorate his musical legacy.

On April 22 2009, the Israeli Stamp Service issued a series of 12 postal stamps on the subject of Israeli music. One of the stamps in this collection was dedicated in memory of Lavie. The stamp, with a portrait of Lavie, was designed by the artist Miri Nestor Sofer. The stamp's tab included a line from Lavie's song "Shir HaKatar" (The locomotive song) - "In the station in Beer Sheba stood a locomotive".
