= Haim Gouri =

Israeli poet (1923–2018)

- חיים גורי
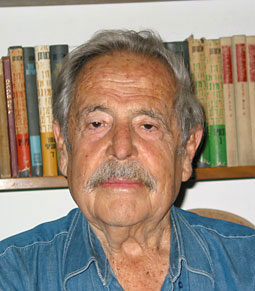
- Haim Gouri in 2005
- Born: Haim Gurfinkel; 9 October 1923; Tel Aviv, Mandate Palestine
- Died: 31 January 2018 (aged 94); Jerusalem
- Citizenship: Israel
- Education: The Hebrew University of Jerusalem; the Sorbonne
- Occupations: Poet, novelist, journalist, and documentary filmmaker
- Awards: 1961 Sokolow Award for Israeli Journalism; 1975 Bialik Prize for literature; 1988 Israel Prize for Hebrew poetry; 1998 Uri Zvi Greenberg Award

Haim Gouri (Hebrew: חיים גורי; né Gurfinkel; 9 October 1923 – 31 January 2018) was an Israeli poet, novelist, journalist, and documentary filmmaker. He was awarded the Israel Prize for poetry in 1988 and was the recipient of several other prizes of national distinction.

== Career ==
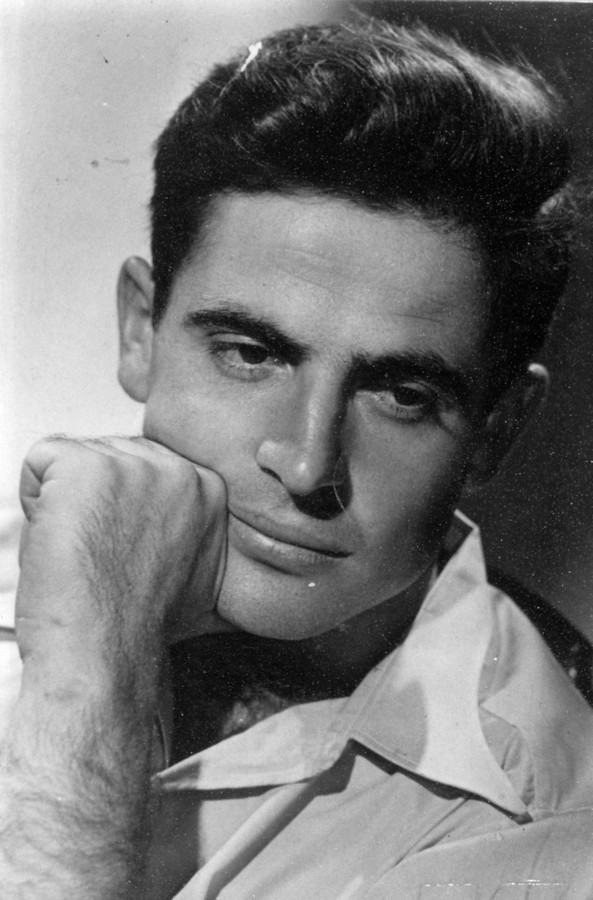
Haim Gouri

Haim Gurfinkel (later Gouri) was born in Tel Aviv to Gila and the politician Yisrael. After studying at the Kadoorie Agricultural High School, he joined the Palmach and completed a commander's course. He participated in the bombing of a British radar station being used to track Aliyah Bet ships carrying illegal Jewish immigrants to Palestine. In 1947 he was sent to Hungary to bring Holocaust survivor to Mandate Palestine. During the 1948 Arab–Israeli War he was a deputy company commander in the Palmach's Negev Brigade.

Gouri studied literature at the Hebrew University of Jerusalem and the Sorbonne in Paris. As a journalist he worked for LaMerhav and later, Davar. He achieved fame with his coverage of the 1961 trial of Adolf Eichmann.

== Literary career ==
Gouri's first published poem, Day Voyage, appeared in Mishmar, edited by Abraham Shlonsky, in 1945. His first complete volume of poetry, Flowers of Fire, was published in 1949 following the 1948 Arab-Israeli War.

Some poems that Gouri wrote became an inseparable part of the Israeli ethos. One of his most famous poems, "Behold, here our bodies lie" (Hebrew: הנה מוטלות גופותינו), was written in the time of Israel's war for independence (1948–1949) to commemorate the 35 soldiers who were killed on their way to the besieged Gush Etzion (Hebrew: גוש עציון) settlements. Gouri also wrote a few famous popular songs such as "The Comradeship" (Hebrew: הרעות) that became representative of Israel's war for independence.

== Awards and recognition ==
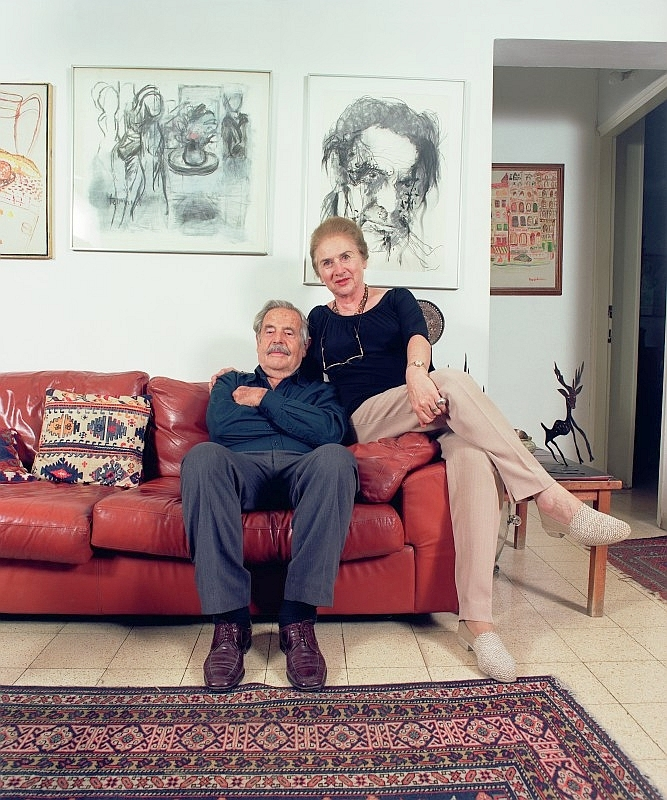
Haim Gouri and his wife Aliza

- In 1961, Gouri obtained the Sokolow Award for Israeli Journalism.
- The film The 81st Blow, which he wrote, co-produced, and co-directed, was nominated for the 1974 Academy Award for Documentary Feature. It is part of a powerful Holocaust trilogy that includes The Last Sea and Flames in the Ashes.
- In 1975, Gouri was awarded the Bialik Prize for literature.
- In 1988, he was awarded the Israel Prize, for Hebrew poetry.
- In 1998, he won the Uri Zvi Grinberg award.
- In 2004, he was awarded the Prime Minister's Prize for Hebrew Literary Works.
- In 2016, Gouri rejected an award from the Israeli Ministry of Culture and Sport of the annual 50,000 shekel prize for “Zionist works of art”.

== Personal life ==
Gouri lived with his wife, Aliza, in Jerusalem. Gouri died on 31 January 2018, at the age of 94.

== Published works ==
=== Poetry ===
- Flowers of Fire (Hebrew: פרחי אש), Hakibbutz Hameuchad (1949)
- Till Dawn (Hebrew: עד עלות השחר), Hakibbutz Hameuchad (1950)
- Poems of the Seal (Hebrew: שירי חותם), Hakibbutz Hameuchad (1954)
- Compass Rose (Hebrew: שושנת רוחות), Hakibbutz Hameuchad (1960)
- Gehazi Visions (Hebrew: מראות גיחזי), Hakibbutz Hameuchad (1967)
- Movement to Touch (Hebrew: תנועה למגע), Hakibbutz Hameuchad (1968)
- The Eagle Line (Hebrew: עד קו נשר), Hakibbutz Hameuchad (1975)
- Summer's End (Hebrew: מחברות אלול), Hakibbutz Hameuchad (1985)
- The One Who Came After Me (Hebrew: הבא אחרי), Hakibbutz Hameuchad (1993)
- Words in My Love-Sick Blood (selected poems in English translation). Detroit: Wayne State University, 1996, ISBN 0-8143-2594-7.
- The Poems (Hebrew: השירים), in two volumes, Bialik Institute (1998)
- Late Poems (Hebrew: מאוחרים), Hakibbutz Hameuchad, (2002)
- I Am a Civil War (Hebrew: אני מלחמת אזרחים), Daniella De-Nur, Hakibbutz Hameuchad, (2004).
- Eyval (Hebrew: עיבל), Hakibbutz Hameuchad, (2009)
- Though I Wished for More of More (Hebrew: אף שרציתי עוד קצת עוד), Hakibbutz Hameuchad, Daniella De-Nur, (2015)

=== Fiction ===
- The Chocolate Deal (Hebrew: הספר המשוגע), Hakibbutz Hameuchad (1965). English translations: New York: Holt, Rinehart & Winston, 1968, ISBN 1-125-15196-X. Detroit: Wayne State University Press, 1999, ISBN 0-8143-2800-8.
- The Crazy Book (Hebrew: הספר המשוגע). Am Oved Publishers, (1971)
- The Interrogation, The Story of Reuel (Hebrew: החקירה, סיפור רעואל). Am Oved Publishers, (1980)
- Who Knows Joseph G? (Hebrew: מי מכיר את יוסף ג'), Hakibbutz Hameuchad (1980)

=== Non-fiction ===
- Pages of Jerusalem (Hebrew: דפים ירושלמיים) Hakibbutz Hameuchad, notes (1968)
- Facing the Glass Booth: the Jerusalem Trial of Adolf Eichmann (1962). English translation: Detroit: Wayne State University, 2004, ISBN 0-8143-3087-8.
- The Imprint of Memory (Hebrew: חותם הזיכרון), Hakibbutz Hameuchad, Bialik Institute, (2015).

== Documentary films ==
- The 81st Blow (Ha-Makah Hashmonim V'Echad, 1974), distributed with English subtitles by "American Federation of Jewish Fighters, Camp Inmates and Nazi Victims"
- The Last Sea (Ha-Yam Ha'Aharon, 1980)
- Flames in the Ashes (Pnei Hamered, 1985)

== See also ==
- Hareut
- Hebrew literature
- Sokolov Award
- List of Israel Prize recipients
- List of Bialik Prize recipients
