= Haim Hefer =

Israeli songwriter and columnist (1925–2012)

- חיים חפר
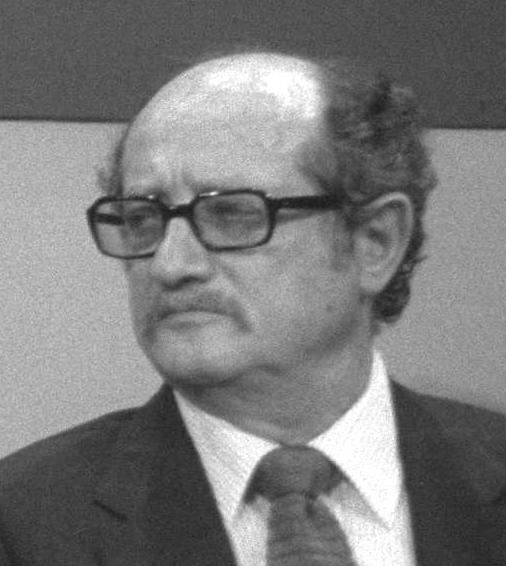
- Hefer in 1983
- Born: Haim Feiner; 29 October 1925; Sosnowiec, Second Polish Republic
- Died: 18 September 2012 (aged 86); Tel Aviv, Israel
- Citizenship: Israel
- Occupations: Songwriter, poet, writer
- Spouse: Ruti Haramati
- Children: Mimi
- Writing career
- Period: 1930s–2012
- Subjects: war, peace, politics, current affairs
- Notable works: HaFinjan (The Finjan (Note: Finjan in Israel (and in the song) refers to a coffee pot with a long handle, also known as cezve elsewhere. In Arabic, finjan is a kind of coffee cup. In the culture of Israel, finjan, a coffee pot with a long handle has a special meaning. After a hard day's work the pioneers of Israel would sit by the fire passing a finjan around. This is reflected in Hefer's song "HaFinjan", set to an Armenian folk tune "Hingala".)), Hayu Zmanim (In Those Days), Hamilkhama Ha'achrona (The Last War), HaSela haAdom (The Red Rock)
- Notable awards: 1983 Israel Prize

Haim Hefer (Hebrew: חיים חפר; 29 October 1925 – 18 September 2012) was a Polish-born Israeli songwriter, poet, columnist, translator and writer. He wrote for numerous composers and musical artists, as well as for military bands. Several of his songs are considered Israeli classics. He was awarded the Israel Prize in 1983 as recognition for his contributions to Israeli music.

== Biography ==
Haim Feiner (later Hefer) was born in Sosnowiec, Poland in 1925 to Jewish parents Issachar Feiner, a chocolate salesman, and Rivka Herzberg, a housewife. He had a private Hebrew tutor. His family immigrated to Palestine in 1936 and settled in Raanana. He began writing at the age of 13, as part of a national contest. He never finished high school and joined the Palmach in 1943. He took part in smuggling illegal immigrants through Syria and Lebanon. During the 1948 Arab-Israeli War, he was one of the founders of the Chizbatron, the Palmach army troupe, and was its chief songwriter. He had a nickname, "Kilometer", because he "weighed a kilo and was only a meter in height."

Hefer owned a house in Ein Hod, but resided in Tel Aviv. He was married to Ruti Haramati, with whom he had a daughter, Mimi. In 1975–1978 Hefer was a cultural attaché at the Israeli Consulate in Los Angeles.

On 18 September 2012 (the second day of Rosh Hashanah, 5773), Hefer died at Sourasky Medical Center in Tel Aviv, after a long illness.

== Music career ==
In the 1950s, Hefer and Dahn Ben-Amotz wrote A Bag of Fibs, a collection of tall tales made up in the Palmach, and founded the "Hamam" club in Jaffa. During that time, he founded "Revi'iat Moadon HaTeatron" (Theater Club Quartet). He wrote a weekly column for Yediot Aharonot, which included maqamas on current affairs. A Bag of Fibs achieved cult status in Israel. He was later made a cultural attache to the Israeli consul in Los Angeles.

He wrote for dozens of composers, including Sasha Argov, Moshe Wilensky and Dubi Seltzer. Artists who performed his songs include Arik Lavie, Yehoram Gaon, Shoshana Damari and Yafa Yarkoni, as well as The High Windows and most Israeli military bands. He wrote lyrics for musicals, including Kazablan and I Like Mike (made into the film with the same name). Many of his songs, such as "Yatzanu at", "HaFinjan" (The Finjan), "Hayu Zmanim" (In Those Days), "The Red Rock" (HaSela haAdom) and "Hamilkhama Ha'achrona" (The Last War) are considered Israeli classics. He also published several collections of his verses. Shortly before the 1948 war, he wrote a song titled "Between the Borders", about immigration. It included the words "We are here, a defensive shield". In 2002, the Israel Defense Forces (IDF) launched an operation in the West Bank and named it Operation Defensive Shield.

== Controversy ==
In 2002, Hefer described Moroccan Jewish culture as inferior to that of the Polish Jews. He called Aviv Geffen a phony and criticized Yaffa Yarkoni for badmouthing the IDF. His remarks were condemned as racist and criticized by then President of Israel, Moshe Katsav, members of the Moroccan community, and representatives of the Shas Party, as well as Mizrahi musicians such as Margalit Tzan'ani. Hefer made a public apology and wrote a song for singer Zehava Ben.

== Awards and recognition ==
- 1969: Sokolov Award for journalism
- 1981: ACUM Prize for lifetime achievement
- 1983: Israel Prize, for Hebrew song (words), for his contribution to the Music of Israel.
- 2011: Lifetime Achievement Award from the Bar-Ilan University

In 2008, a book was published in Poland, "Chaim Chefer—Memorable Days"("Chaim Chefer – Pamiętne Dni"), the graphics developed by Pawel Slota under the artistic supervision of Agnieszka Tyrman. The book was created out of admiration and respect for the work of Chaim Chefer in the jubilee year of the 60th anniversary of the State of Israel.

== Gallery ==
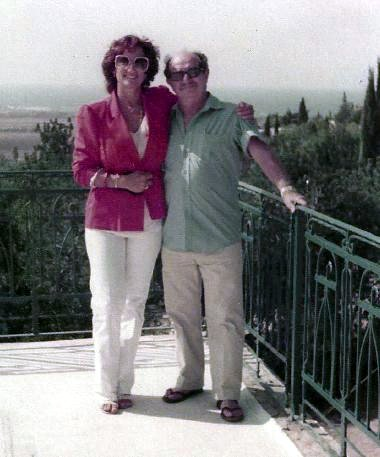
Haim Hefer and Rachel Haramati

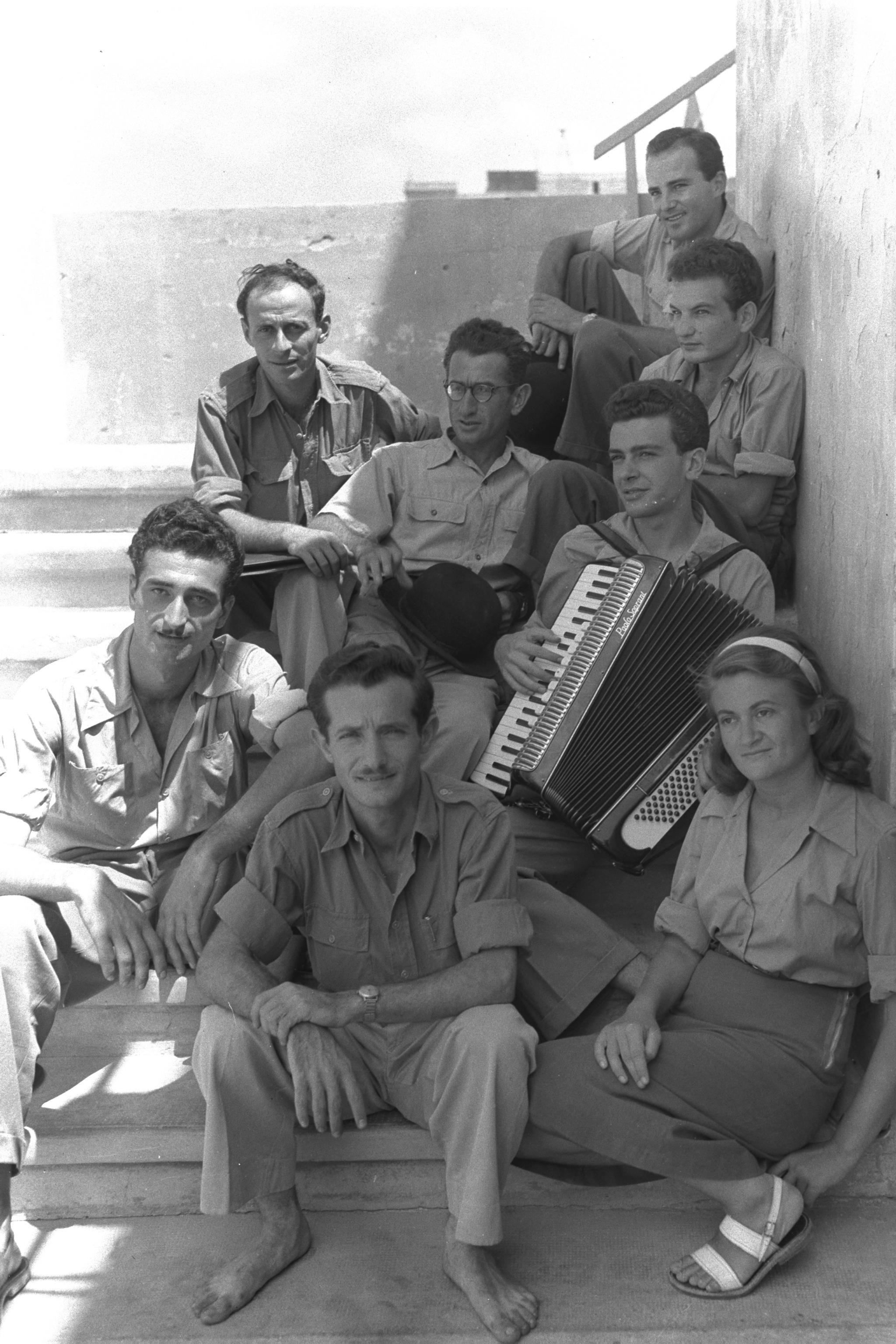
Hefer with the Chizbatron, September 1949

== See also ==
- Music of Israel
- Culture of Israel
- List of Israel Prize recipients
