= Miriam Yalan-Shteklis =

Israeli writer (1900–1984)

- מרים ילן-שטקליס
- Born: Miriam Wilensky; 21 September 1900; Potoki, near Kremenchuk, Russian Empire
- Died: 9 May 1984 (aged 83)
- Citizenship: Israeli
- Occupations: Writer and poet
- Known for: Children's books
- Awards: 1956 Israel Prize for Children's Literature; 1968 Yakir Yerushalaim Award

Miriam Yalan-Shteklis (also Miriam Yalan-Stekelis; Hebrew: מרים ילן-שטקליס; 21 September 1900 – 9 May 1984) was an Israeli writer and poet famous for her children's books. Her surname, Yalan, was an acronym based on her father's name, Yehuda Leib Nissan.

== Biography ==
Miriam Wilensky (later Yalan-Shteklis) was born in the town of Potoki, near Kremenchuk in the Russian Empire (modern Ukraine). She was the daughter of Hoda (Hadassah) and Yehuda Leib Nissan Vilensky, a Zionist leader descended from a long line of rabbis, and learned Hebrew as a child.

After the failed Russian Revolution of 1905, the family moved from place to place: Berlin, Minsk, Petrograd and finally Kharkov. In 1912, when she was 12, her brother Mulya (Shmuel) was sent to Ottoman Palestine to study at the Herzliya Hebrew High School. Yalan-Shteklis attended high school in Minsk and Petrograd, and studied psychology and social sciences at the University of Kharkov. She also pursued Judaic studies at the Hochschule für die Wissenschaft des Judentums in Berlin.

In 1920, she immigrated to Mandatory Palestine and settled in the Rehavia neighborhood in Jerusalem. In 1928, she went to Paris to study library science. From 1929, she joined the staff of the Jewish National University Library at the Hebrew University of Jerusalem. She headed the Slavic department for 30 years. In 1929, she married Moshe Stekelis, a professor of archaeology. She died in Haifa on 9 May 1984, at the age of 83.

== Literary career ==
Yalan-Shteklis published her first poem in Hebrew in 1922. In 1933, she turned to writing poems and stories for children, and published her work in the children's weekly Davar Leyeladim. The pain of losing her mother at the age of 16 permeates many of her poems.

She had no children of her own, but displayed an unusual gift for writing for the young and became Israel's leading children's poet. She used to say that "poems emanate from the suffering soul and like children, they are born in suffering." She challenged one of the central conventions of modern children's literature — the "happy ending". She portrayed happy children at play, but also their anger and pain, often pointing an accusing finger at adults. An example is her famous poem Levadi (All alone), written in 1957.

In addition to poetry, Yalan-Shtelis translated children's literature into Hebrew from Russian, English, German and Dutch, as well as works by Samuel Marshak, Erich Kastner, Leo Tolstoy, P. L. Travers, and others.

== Literary themes and style ==
Yalan-Shteklis' work is permeated with positive educational values but avoids the trap of didactic preaching. Incorporating nationalist Zionist ideology, but also the traditions of Russian and European literature, her work is nevertheless original and Israeli.

The poetry, fiction, and translations of Yalan-Stekelis were collected in three volumes published between 1957 and 1963, with illustrations by Zila Binder: Shir ha-Gedi (Song of the kid); Yesh Li Sod (I have a secret); and Ba-Halomi (In my dream). The works were organized by age level, with a separate volume for each level. In 1986, this collection was reprinted in a single-volume special edition. The first volume contains songs and stories for preschoolers and non-readers. It includes play-songs (an innovation in Hebrew children's poetry), rhymes for finger-play, lullabies, nature poems, poems aimed at the inculcation of good habits, and poems just for amusement and expressing emotions. The second volume, for children with reading skills, offers longer stories that probe the relationships between children and parents, and between children and their peer group. The third volume, for older children, contains Zionist poems about the Land of Israel, bereavement and losing parents in the Holocaust. Alongside poems filled with hope for peace and redemption are lyrical-confessional poems about the fears and emotions of a child trying to come to terms with his/her identity and living in society.

== Awards ==
- In 1956, Yalan-Shteklis was awarded the Israel Prize for Children's Literature. It was the first time this category was included. In their decision, the judges wrote: "…Whatever she wrote, she wrote for children, and whatever she wrote bore no hint of deliberate infantilization but rather of true childhood, genuine and realistic, that embraces joy and innocence but also sorrow and tears, life’s wisdom and life’s evils, disappointment and consolation. She flavored her poems for children with all the key ingredients that mark good children’s poetry. Her work possesses a wonderful sense of the world of children. Language that draws upon sources both ancient and modern, admirable poetic skills and perfect musicality are a rare phenomenon in any nation and language, and not every literature is so blessed" (Editorial, Davar li-Yeladim).
- In 1968, she was made an Honorary citizen of Jerusalem and granted the Yakir Yerushalaim award.

== Musical collaboration ==
Many of her poems were set to music and have become Israeli children's classics. In 1975 Israeli singers Shmulik Kraus and Josie Katz put out an album of songs based on her poems.

== Published work ==
- Hurry, Hurry Dwarfs!, 1939 [Atzu Ratzu Gamadim]
- Danny, 1943 [Danny]
- Rain, 1944 [Geshem]
- Tol-Tol and His Sand, 1944 [Tol-Tol Ba'al Ha-Hol]
- The Journey to the Maybe Island, 1944 [Ha-Masah La Ee Ulai]
- The Girl Millik and Aunt Phillik, 1945 [Ma'ase Ba-Yaldah Millik U Ba-Doda Phillik]
- Once There Was a Girl, 1946 [Ma'aseh Be-Yaldah]
- How Songs Come to the Heart, 1947 [Eich Ba'im Shirim Le-Lev Ha-Adam]
- The Story of a Curtain, Paris, 1952 [Ma'aseh Be-Parochet]
- Bimmi, 1953 [Bimmi]
- Birthday, Dvir, 1962 [Yom Huledet]
- Wheels, Hadar 1957 [Galgalim]
- Kid's Song, Dvir, 1958–63 [Shir Ha-Gdi]
- I Have a Secret, Dvir, 1958–63 [Yesh Li Sod]
- In My Dream, Dvir, 1958–63 [Be-Halomi]
- Lie?, Ekked, 1966 [Sheker?]
- Two Legends, Dvir, 1972 [Shtei Agadot]
- Brave Danny and Other Poems, 1975 [Danny Gibor Ve-Shirim Aherim]
- A Paper Bridge, 1978 [Gesher Shel Niyar]
- Life and Words, Kiryat Sefer, 1978 [Hayim Ve-Milim]
- The Soap Cried Loudly, [Hasabon Bakha Me'od]

=== Translated ===
- Selected Poems

French: Jerusalem, Departament de la Jeunesse du Keren Hayesod, 1946 Russian: Tel Aviv, Am Oved, 1966

- A Paper Bridge

Spanish: Jerusalem, Miriam Yalan-Shteklis & Esther Solay-Levy, 1978

- The Journey to the Maybe Island

Arabic: Jerusalem, Al-Sharq, 1972

== See also ==
- List of Israel Prize recipients
- Women in Israel
- Israeli literature
