= The Pure Souls =

Israeli music band

The Pure Souls (Hebrew: הנשמות הטהורות) was an Israeli music band that was active between 1972 and 1975. Many of the songs from their only album, also called The Pure Souls, are still played on Israeli radio, in the original versions and in a variety of cover versions. These songs symbolize the era of Yom Kippur War.

Band member and manager, Nathan Cohen wrote and composed most of the band's songs. He was also the only band member who stayed in the band during the entire time it was active. After the band stopped existing officially, Cohen recorded some albums in a variety of musical groups and as a solo singer. His record from 1983 included some hits. However, he never repeated the success he had with The Pure Souls.

Cohen established The Pure Souls after serving in a military band of Israel Defense Forces with Yoram Yochamy who also joined The Pure Souls. Some of the songs included in The Pure Souls album were recorded by Cohen and Yochamy when they still soldiers, serving in the military band. Most of the songs were recorded when The Pure Souls included Cohen, Yochamy and Nava Brochin, after those three musicians were released from serving in military bands and before they were recruited again, in the war. In the war, The Pure Souls became a new military band.

After many months active military reserve force service, Yochamy and Brochin had left the band. Irit Burla and Matti Caspi took their place, and completed the reserve service and the album recording. The band made a concert tour after publishing the record.
