= Tomer Ganihar =

Israeli photographer and writer (born 1970)

- תומר גניהר
- Born: 1970 (age 55–56); Israel
- Occupations: Photographer, author

Tomer Ganihar (Hebrew: תומר גניהר; born in 1970) is an Israeli photographer and writer. Ganihar, a self-taught artist, is known for his distinctive photographic style that employs only color film and natural light. His work, which often captures the dynamics of Israeli youth culture, has been exhibited in various museums and galleries worldwide, including the Tel Aviv Museum of Art, the Helsinki City Art Museum, and the Headquarters of the United Nations in New York City.

Ganihar's early photography focused on the Israeli young counterculture scene, documenting rave parties and nightclubs. This body of work presents an alternative, cosmopolitan aspect of Israeli life, contrasting with the region's conflicts.

In addition to his photography, Ganihar has published a book of selected essays titled Electricity in the Air (2001), a collection of short stories, Welcome to Texas (1996), and a novel, Sodom-City (2015). His writings explore themes similar to those in his photography, often focusing on modern spirituality and cultural issues. Ganihar has also engaged in filmmaking, writing and directing Prophet on the Run (2008), a 54-minute fiction film.

== Biography ==
Tomer Ganihar was born in 1970. Ganihar, a self-taught photographer, grew up and works in Israel. His first solo exhibition was shown at Limbus gallery of photography, Tel Aviv 1997, when he was awarded by The Israeli President Residence Prize for Young Artists. In 2000, he became the youngest artist to have a solo exhibition at the Tel Aviv Museum of Art. Since then, his works have been shown in museums and galleries such as Helsinki City Art Museum, GL STRAND Museum in Copenhagen, Contemporary Arts Center (New Orleans), Paul Rodgers/9W Gallery N.Y and the Headquarters of the United Nations, New York. He has been living and working in New York City between 2000 and 2008, as well as in Italy and India, and is represented by Shoshana Wayne Gallery, Los Angeles. Ganihar has participated in the international pavilion at the 52 Venice Biennale, in 2007, curated by Robert Storr (art academic) with his photo-series "hospital party".

Since an early stage, Ganihar's photography has focused mainly on crowds and on the Israeli young counterculture scene, rave parties, night clubs culture and multi-days nature parties in the Galilee forests and the Dead Sea. This work reflects a modern spiritual and cosmopolitan culture as an alternative to the reality of militarism, conflicts and religious tension in the Middle East. The New Yorker wrote: "There is elegy to the ecstasy in Tomer Ganihar's photographs of young Israeli party goers…'Raving in the Negev Desert' vibrates with mystical presence; its impressionistic blurs unite youthful bodies and ancient sand". In more recent years, Ganihar's photography is focused on abstracts of light and form.

Ganihar captures his images without artificial lighting, using color film only. Deborah Bach writes in The New York Times: "Perceiving light as a holy, unifying force, Mr. Ganihar works without a flash, using a slow shutter speed to capture the available light of his surroundings. The effect is often ethereal, the grainy figures in his photos awash in a kinetic radiance". "Pan, focus, dissolve; the visual variables are cinematic as much as they are photographic" wrote Robert Storr, "This is unsurprising given that Ganihar is also a filmmaker, and necessary given that the targets of his lens are usually kinetic."

In between 1996 and 1999, Ganihar's column "Electricity in the Air" has been published in Haaretz weekend magazine. His selected essays were published later in his book "Electricity in the Air", 2001. Ganihar's book of short stories, "Welcome To Texas", was published in 1996, and his novel "Sodom-City" was published in May 2015.

Ganihar wrote and directed the film "Prophet on the Run", a 54 minutes fiction. The film in which he also co-produced with Ido Berlad, was premiered in Tel Aviv Cinematheque in 2008, and participated in The Britain International film festival (2008) and Los Angeles Film Festival (2009). Currently on production are Ganihar's films, "Shadow" and "Chosen".

== Selected solo exhibitions ==
- 1996 Limbus Gallery of photography, Tel-Aviv
- 1998 Chelouch Gallery, Tel Aviv
- 2000 Tel Aviv Museum Of Art
- 2003 United Nation Headquarters, New York
- 2005 Contemporary Arts Center (New Orleans)
- 2005 Paul Rodgers/9W Gallery, New York
- 2008 Gallery 39, Tel Aviv
- 2008 Art Museum tennis palace, Helsinki City Art Museum
- 2009 GL STRAND Museum, Copenhagen
- 2011 Battat Contemporary gallery, Montreal

== Selected group exhibitions ==
- 1998 Urban Touch, Camera Obscura, Tel Aviv
- 1999 90thAnniversary of Tel Aviv, Tel Aviv Museum of Art
- 2000 Views From Israel, Gallery of Contemporary Art, San Francisco
- 2001 Spunky, Exit Art, New York
- 2003 Recent Acquisitions, Jewish Museum (Manhattan)
- 2007 The International Pavilion, the Venice Biennale
- 2012 Yale University Art Gallery
- 2014-5 The Sensory War 1914–2014, Manchester Art Gallery, UK

== Books (author) ==
- 1996 Welcome To Texas, Short Stories, Gvanim Publishing
- 2001 Electricity in the Air, Essays, Yediot Ahronoth Publishing
- 2015 Sodom-City, noble, Kinneret Zmora-Bitan Dvir publishing. (Scheduled for publication, May 2015)

== Films (writer-director) ==
- 2008 Prophet on the Run

== Awards ==
- 1997 The President Residence Prize for Young Artists
- 1998 Yehoshua Rabinovitz foundation – Writing Grant

== Selected collections - public and private ==
Samuel Irving Newhouse, Jr. (Si Newhouse), N M Rothschild & Sons Bank Zürich, Yale University Art Gallery, Bronfman family, Michael Steinhardt, Stern family N.Y, Arthur Fleischer, Nouriel Rubini, Jewish Museum (Manhattan), Israel Museum, Tel-Aviv Museum of Art, GL STRAND Museum, Helsinki City Art Museum, D.H Blair Bank.
