= Sasha Argov =

Israeli musical artist

Alexander "Sasha" Argov סשה ארגוב
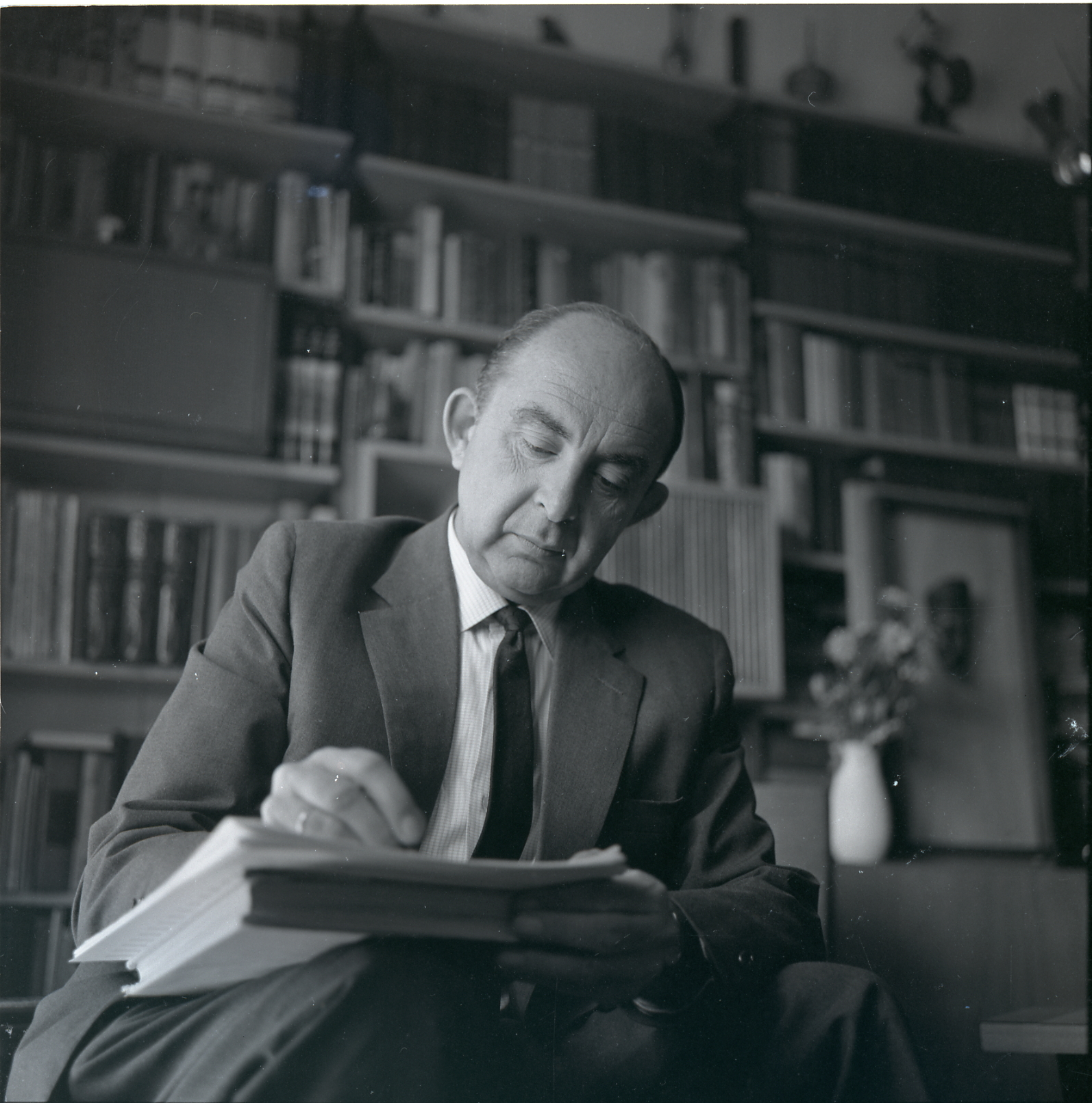

Background information
- Born: Alexander Abramovich; 26 October 1914; Moscow, Russian Empire
- Died: 27 September 1995 (aged 80) Tel Aviv, Israel
- Occupation: Composer

Alexander "Sasha" Argov (Hebrew: סשה ארגוב; born Alexander Abramovich; Moscow, 26 October 1914 – Tel Aviv, 27 September 1995) was a prominent Israeli composer.

== Life and career ==
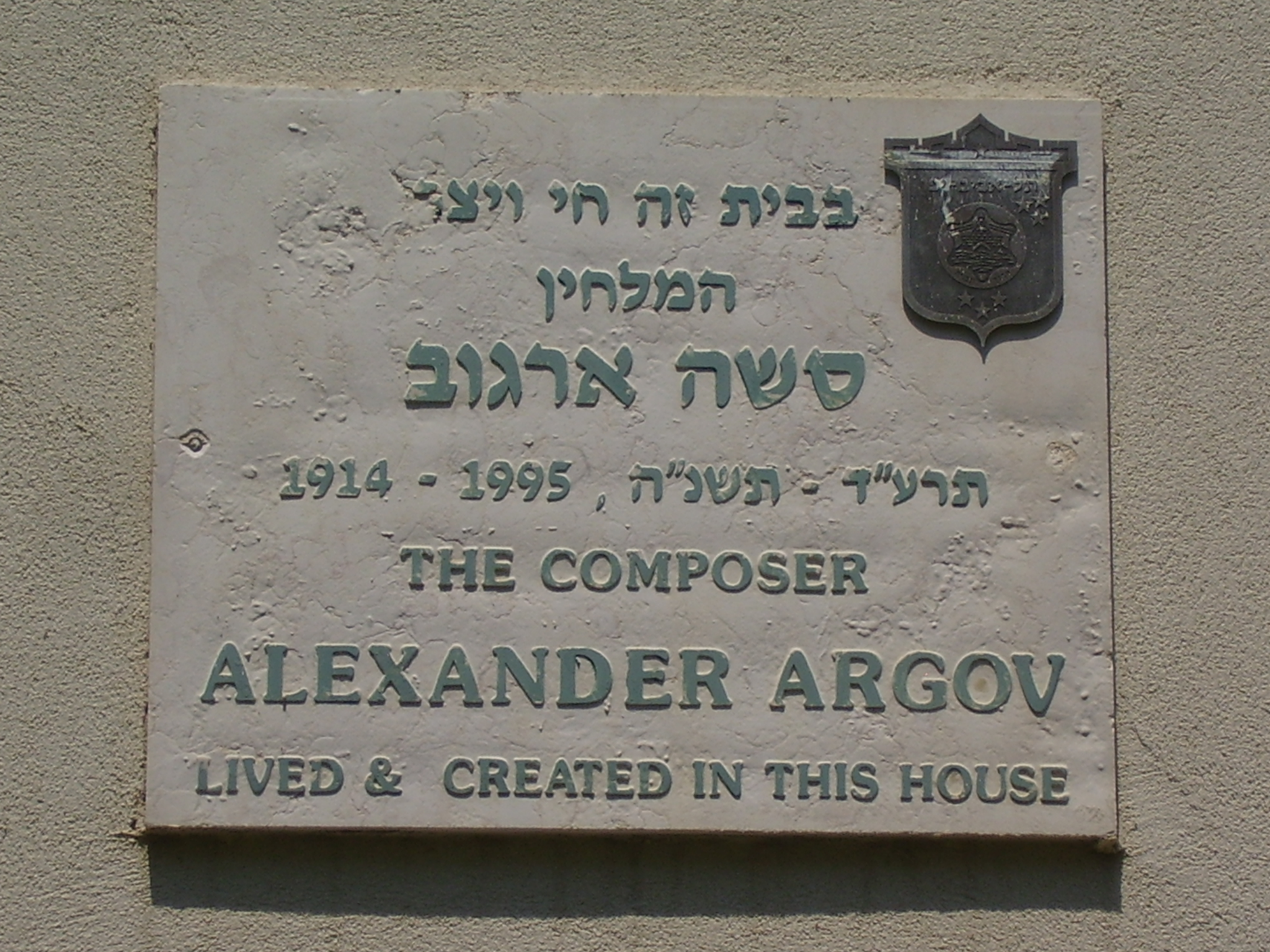
Memorial Plaque on the composer Alexander Argov house

Argov was born Alexander Abramovich in Moscow, Russia in 1914. Later he changed his last name to its Hebrew version, Argov, in 1946. His father was a dentist and his mother a concert pianist. He began studying the piano with his mother at the age of three, and at the age of six he began to compose music by ear which his mother transcribed into music notation for him. He had no formal education in music outside of his lessons with his mother.

He migrated to British Palestine from Russia in 1934 with his parents. He never made a living with his music, working first as a bank clerk and later owning and operating a bookshop.

Argov composed many popular songs, producing approximately 1,200 works. Among them were "Hareut" and songs for the Israel Defense Forces, film, and theater. In 1948 he published Ha’Chizbatron, a collection of his songs written for the entertainment of Israeli troupes. He collaborated with Chaim Hefer and Matti Caspi, two of whose albums feature melodies written exclusively by Argov. He also composed several film scores and musicals for the stage; of which the most successful was Shlomo hamelech ve’Shalmai hansandlar (‘King Solomon and the Cobbler’), based on a comedy by Sammy Gronemann in Nathan Alterman's translation, which premiered in 1964. In 1988 he was awarded the Israel Prize in Hebrew song.

== Dramatic works ==
- Rak lo be’Shabat (film score, 1964)
- Shlomo hamelech ve’Shalmai hasandlar (musical, 1964)
- Harpatka bakirkas (children’s play with music, 1965)
- Androceles ve’ha’arie (children’s play with music, 1966)
- Ester hamalka (musical, 1966)
- Hu halach basadot (film score, 1967)
- Chagigat kaiz (musical, 1972)
- Doda Klara (film score, 1977)

== Commemoration ==
Argov died in 1995, at the age of 80. He was buried in Yarkon cemetery.

His archive is kept in the Israel National Library.

Streets were named after him in several cities in Israel: in Tel Aviv, Rishon Lezion, Ra'anana, Kfar Saba, Ramla, and in Netivot.

On April 22 2009, the Israeli Stamp Service issued a series of 12 postal stamps on the subject of Israeli music. One of the stamps in this collection was dedicated in memory of Argov. The stamp, with a portrait of Argov, was designed by the artist Miri Nestor Sofer. The stamp's tab included the opening line from Argov's song "Panas Boded" (Single Lamp) - "Once upon a time there was a single lamp at the end of the neighborhood".

In collaboration with singer Roni Ginosar, Gon Halevi produced an album featuring new interpretations of the works of Argov. The album presents a contemporary take on Argov’s music, with Halevi reimagining the original compositions through intricate harmonies.

== See also ==
- List of Israel Prize recipients
