= Shmulik Kraus =

Israeli singer-songwriter and actor

- שמוליק קראוס
- Kraus in 1953
- Born: Shmuel Kraus; 1 July 1935; Jerusalem, Mandatory Palestine
- Died: 17 February 2013 (aged 77); Tel Aviv, Israel
- Occupations: Singer; composer; actor
- Known for: Pioneering Israeli music, films, and children's music

Shmuel 'Shmulik' Kraus (Hebrew: שמוליק קראוס; 1 July 1935 – 17 February 2013) was an Israeli pop-rock singer, composer, and actor. Kraus, one of the pioneers of Israeli music, underwent various personal crises in the course of his career. He appeared in several films, including Rocking Horse and Hole in the Moon, and composed songs for other performers, such as Shalom Hanoch. He was also known for his music for children based on the lyrics of Miriam Yalan-Shteklis.

== Biography ==
Kraus was born in the Nahalat Ahim quarter of Jerusalem. He was one of four brothers. His mother, Rosa, was a housewife, and his father, Musa, was a driver. Kraus began his career in the arts by teaching tap dance in Haifa. After serving in the Israeli Navy, he worked as a merchant seaman. Kraus married Josie Katz, who eventually divorced him and left the country in the early 1980s to develop an independent career. In March 1971, Kraus was arrested for illegal gun possession after threatening Israeli soldiers sent to evict him from a building he had constructed on a plot near Nebi Samuel, which he said he had inherited from his father. According to the authorities, the Ottoman deed he held was not valid. On 17 February 2013, Kraus died after being hospitalized with swine influenza.

== Music career ==
Kraus began to sing at the end of the 1950s along with Abraham Reichstadt (known as Avi Ofarim, before inclusion of Esther Ofarim). He composed and performed the "prairie house", a song written in memory of his father, who was active in the establishment of Kibbutz Beit HaArava.

In the early 1960s, he met Josie Katz, later his wife, who came to Israel from the United States to volunteer at a kibbutz. He became her partner and produced her as a club singer in Eilat and Tel Aviv. In 1966, he, Katz and Arik Einstein established The High Windows band. Kraus composed all the group's songs, pop songs and rock that were innovative for their time.

In the early 70s, Kraus participated in recording albums of Arik Einstein. He composed songs to Einstein ("When you cry, you're not pretty"), Arik Lavie ("It Happens"), to Katz band ("Ballad for a Kibbutz deserter") and the "Good, the Bad and the Girl" group ("Days of Cinema").

In 1971, he was charged with illegal gun possession and spent time in prison. During his incarceration, he wrote songs for his first solo album, The State of Israel vs. Kraus Shmuel. One song, “Hot Friday,” was banned from the airwaves because it was about smoking hashish. A color video clip was also disqualified because Kraus appears in it smoking cannabis.

In 1975, Kraus and Josie Katz put out an album of songs based on the poems of Miriam Yalan-Shteklis.

== Awards and recognition ==
Israeli astronaut Ilan Ramon chose his song "Hatishma Koli" to be played while he orbited Earth on the Columbia space shuttle in 2003.

== Filmography ==
Year	Title	Role
1964	Hor B'Levana	
1966	Fortuna	Fortuna's brother
1967	999 Aliza Mizrahi	Yaron Zinder
1968	Iris	Joram
1969	‘’Royal Hunt of the Sun’’	Felipelo
1973	Adam	
1978	Sus Etz	
1983	Magash Hakesef	
1984	The Ambassador	Stone

== Discography ==
Year	Album
1965	Chants D'Israel par Shmulik
1967	The High Windows
1975	Alone Together and Alone Alone
1977	The State of Israel Versus Shmulik Kraus
1981	Seventy Eight (collection)
1982	Spinning Wheel
1988	After Twenty Years
1994	Environmentally Friendly
1994	You See Far, You See Clear (collection)
2003	Day After Fleeting Day
2010	The Very Best of (collection)
