= The Royal Hunt of the Sun (film) =

1969 British-American film by Irving Lerner

- Theatrical release poster
- Directed by: Irving Lerner
- Screenplay by: Philip Yordan
- Based on: The Royal Hunt of the Sun by Peter Shaffer
- Produced by: Robert Sisk
- Starring: Robert Shaw; Christopher Plummer; Nigel Davenport; Michael Craig; Andrew Keir; William Marlowe; James Donald; Leonard Whiting
- Edited by: Bill Lewthwaite
- Music by: Marc Wilkinson
- Production companies: Cinema Center Films; Security Pictures
- Distributed by: Rank Organization (Great Britain); National General Pictures (United States)
- Release date: 6 October 1969 (United States)
- Running time: 121 minutes
- Countries: United Kingdom; United States
- Language: English
- Budget: $2 million

The Royal Hunt of the Sun is a 1969 British-American epic historical drama film based on the play of the same name by Peter Shaffer. It stars Robert Shaw as Francisco Pizarro and Christopher Plummer as the Inca Emperor Atahualpa. Plummer appeared in stage versions of the play before appearing in the film, which was shot in South America and Spain. The film and play are based on the Spanish conquest of the Inca Empire (now Peru) by Pizarro in 1530.

== Plot ==
With a small rag-tag band of soldiers, Francisco Pizarro enters the Inca Empire and captures its Emperor, Atahualpa. Pizarro promises to free him in return for a golden ransom, but later finds himself conflicted between his desire to conquer and his friendship for his captive.

== Cast ==
- Robert Shaw as Francisco Pizarro
- Christopher Plummer as Atahualpa
- Nigel Davenport as Hernando de Soto
- Leonard Whiting as Young Martin
- Michael Craig as Estete
- Andrew Keir as Valverde
- William Marlowe as Candia
- James Donald as King Carlos
- Alexander Davion as De Nizza
- Shmulik Kraus as Felipillo
- Percy Herbert as Diego
- David Bauer as Villac Umu

Robert Rietti dubbed three of Plummer’s most important scenes following complaints from American test audiences that the accent used by the actor was unintelligible.

== Production ==
Film rights were bought by writer-producer Phil Yordan, who had made several films in Spain. Bernard Gordon (writer) wrote " Uncharacteristically, he [Yordan] was for the first time risking his own money on a production without other financing and without a release deal."

Yordan met Benjamin Fisz through actor Robert Shaw, who had made films with both men. The project became a company between Fisz's company, Benmar, and Yordan's company, Security Films. Some finance came through Rank. The movie was also financed by Cinema Center Films whose head of production Gordon Stulberg felt the topic at contemporary appeal due to its themes of racial conflict.

Filming started in Peru in May 1967, then shifted to Madrid in July. Gordon wrote "having embarked on what would have been an expensive historical production, Yordan approached it in a most cost-conscious manner" by writing the script himself and hiring cheap behind the scenes talent. This included director Irving Lerner who Gordon says Yordan hired because he was cheap and was a "director he could control, one who would not run up production costs by demanding good sets and locations, by insisting on retakes, by catering to the whims of actors, or in any other way battling the producer for quality results. Irving was also an asset because he had a close relationship with Robert Shaw, who had agreed to accept Irving as director. It’s doubtful that any other star would."

The cinematographer was Roger Barlow, a documentary filmmaker and friend of Lerner who had never made a film before. "Yordan never stopped bitching about Roger’s work and blamed Irving for the blunder," wrote Gordon.

According to designer Eugine Lourie, "The entire production was marred by an atmosphere of hesitant decisions and uncertain direction. It was almost as if, impressed by the beautiful prose of the stage play, the director and pro¬ducer believed the film would direct itself."

Yordan later said Lerner "ruined" the film "for me. He couldn’t direct the picture. He’s a tremendous editor, but he couldn’t direct."

== Reception and legacy ==
=== Critical response ===
According to Bernard Gordon, Yordan managed to get ABC Pictures to guarantee to pay $2 million for the movie, covering Yordan's costs. He claims the film's reception was "a disaster". (It is likely Gordon confused ABC with Cinema Center Films.)

Lourie wrote "The first part of the picture did not progress. Instead of telling the story, it became a collection of disconnected vignettes... Actors, probably impressed by the play, acted accordingly as if they were on a stage. Some beautiful scenes between Pizarro and his young page became empty declamations. I seldom saw such an absence of direction in any other picture I worked on." Lourie added felt the story was "significant, poetic, and often attains the pathos of a Greek tragedy" and Plummer was "stunning; but as a whole, the actors did not live their parts, they declaimed them. Some changes in the flow of the picture remain incomprehensible... this picture in my opinion is a film in search of its own style."

The film has a rating of 56% on Rotten Tomatoes.

=== Home media ===
The Royal Hunt of the Sun was released to DVD by Simitar Entertainment in 1997, and by CBS Home Entertainment on November 25, 2014, via its CBS MOD DVD-on-demand service.

== See also ==
- List of American films of 1969
- List of British films of 1969

== Notes ==
- Gordon, Bernard (1999). Hollywood exile, or, How I learned to love the blacklist : a memoir. University of Texas Press.
- Lourie, Eugene (1985). My work in films. Harcourt Brace Jovanovich.
