= Chizbatron =

First Israeli military band

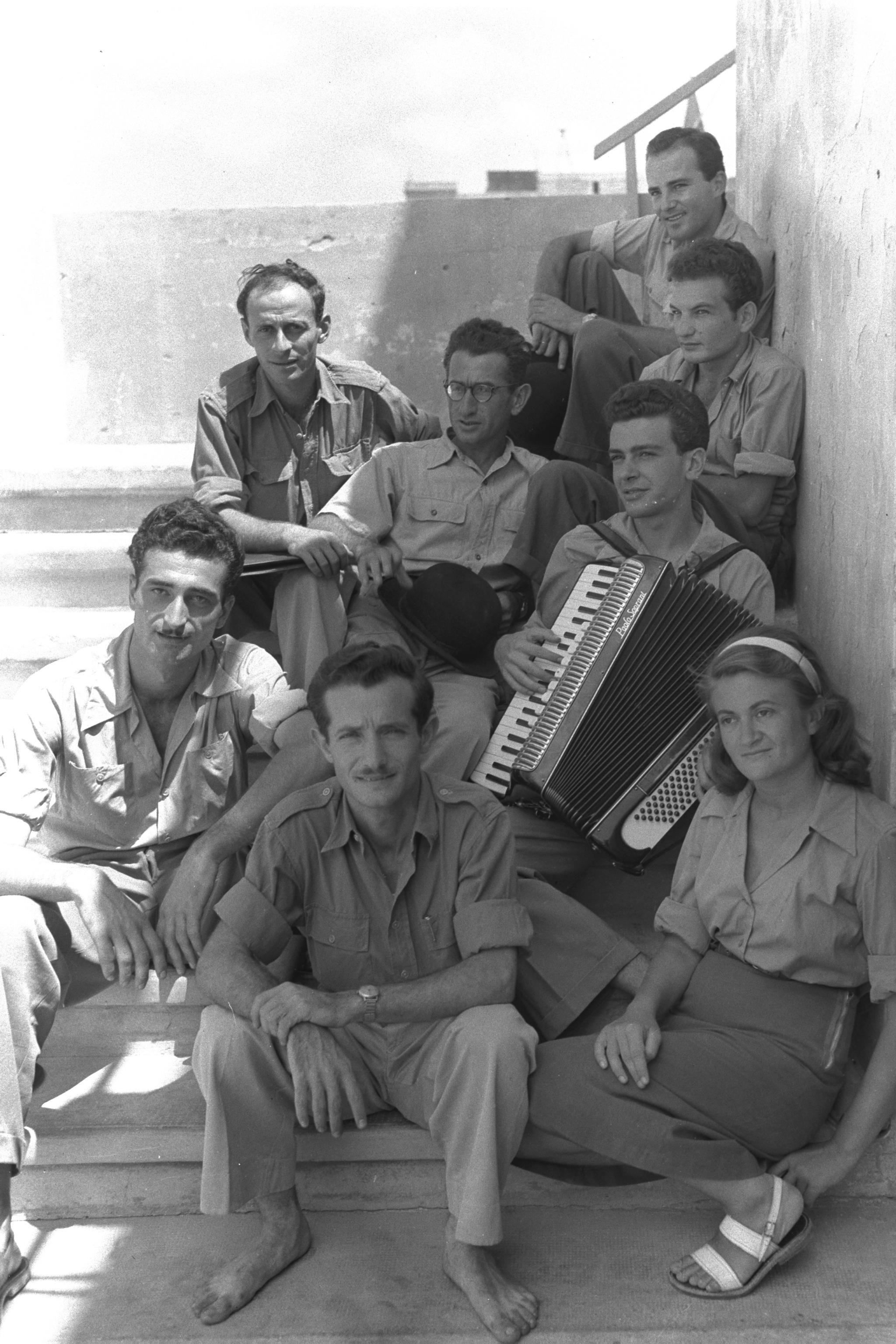
Members of the band in early 1949.

The Chizbatron (Hebrew: צ'יזבטרון; a portmanteau of chizbat, meaning tall tale or campfire story, and teatron, meaning theater) was an Israeli military entertainment troupe associated with the Palmach and later the Israel Defense Forces (IDF). Established during the 1948 Palestine War, it was the first Israeli military ensemble. Several of its songs became standards and were later performed by various Israeli musical groups and artists.

== History ==
The Chizbatron was founded in January 1948. Among its founders was Palmach member Haim Hefer, who served as the troupe’s principal songwriter. Hefer drew inspiration from foreign communist military song and dance troupes, as well as from other entertainment units that existed in the Yishuv. On the basis of improving troop morale, Hefer requested and received authorization from Palmach commander Yigal Allon for a budget of ten pounds sterling to purchase accordions for the new group.

The first musical director was the Russian-born composer Sasha Argov. The Chizbatron's inaugural performance took place on 2 February 1948 for cadets training at Dalia. The troupe traveled by truck or jeep and frequently performed near or at front-line positions during combat operations. One of its notable early performances included the debut of the song Hareut.

In the summer of 1949, the Chizbatron was disbanded by order of the Israel Defense Forces Education and Youth Corps.

During its existence, the troupe staged five productions; a fifth and final one was produced in 1950 as a civilian theater project. Musically, its repertoire combined Western popular rhythms, Russian folk influences, and Ashkenazi Jewish dance forms such as the hora. The arrangements were generally simple and typically accompanied by accordion.

The Chizbatron’s format influenced subsequent IDF entertainment troupes, and many of its songs became enduring Israeli popular standards.

In 1972, the military ensemble Lehakat HaNahal released the album HaPlanchanik ("The Palanchik", a blend of the words Palmach and Nahal)—a tribute to the 30th anniversary of the Palmach—that included material associated with both the Palmach and the Chizbatron.

== See also ==
- Music of Israel
- Culture of Israel
