= Shoshana Damari =

Yemeni-Israeli singer

Shoshana Damari שושנה דמארי
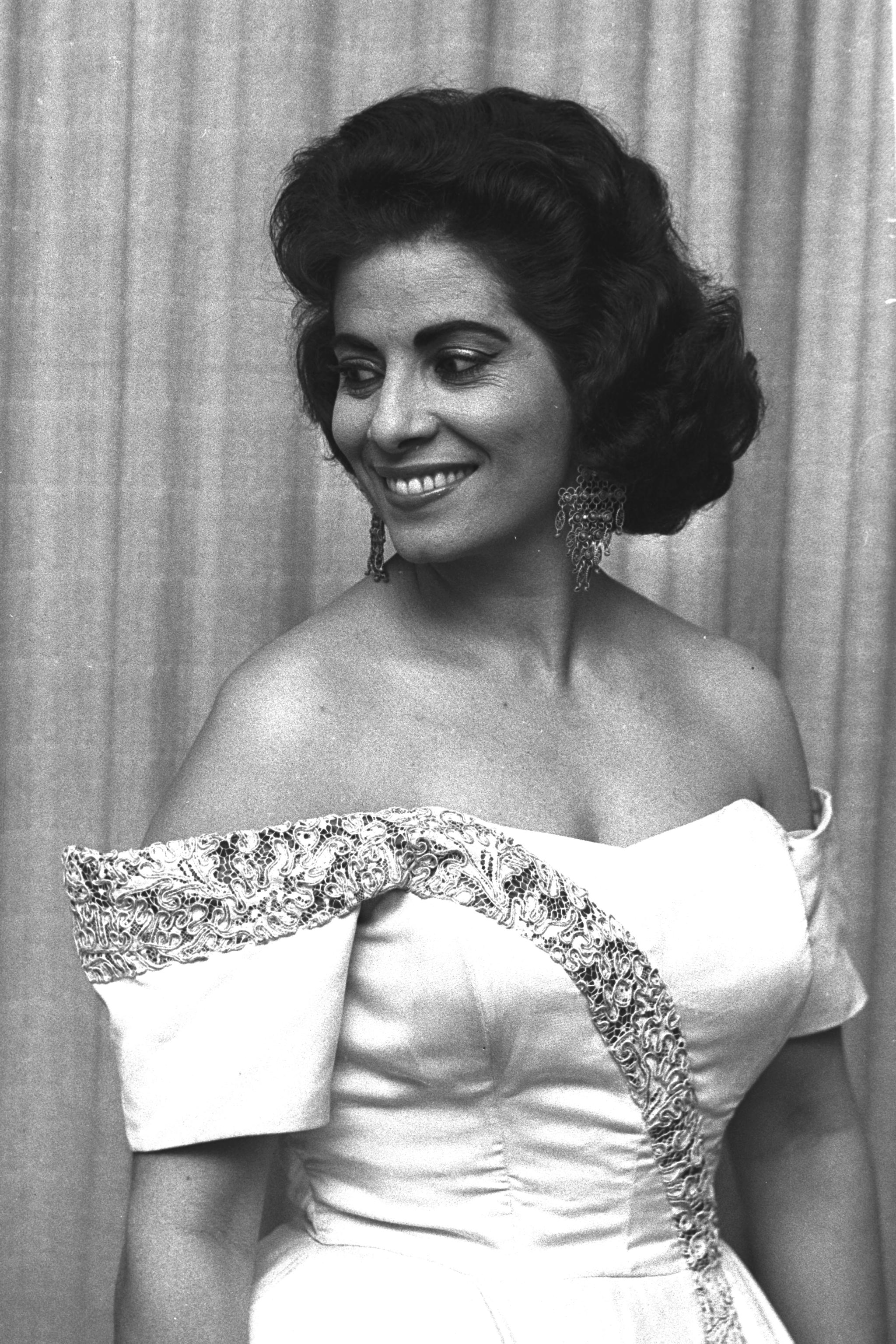
- Damari in 1961

Background information
- Born: 31 March 1923; Bashar, Yemen
- Origin: Dhamar, Yemen
- Died: 14 February 2006 (aged 82) Tel Aviv, Israel
- Genres: Israeli pop, Israeli rock, Mizrahi
- Occupations: Singer; actress
- Years active: 1947–2006
- Label: Hed Artzi

Shoshana Damari (Hebrew: שושנה דמארי; 31 March 1923 – 14 February 2006) was an Israeli singer known as the "Queen of Hebrew Music."

== Biography ==
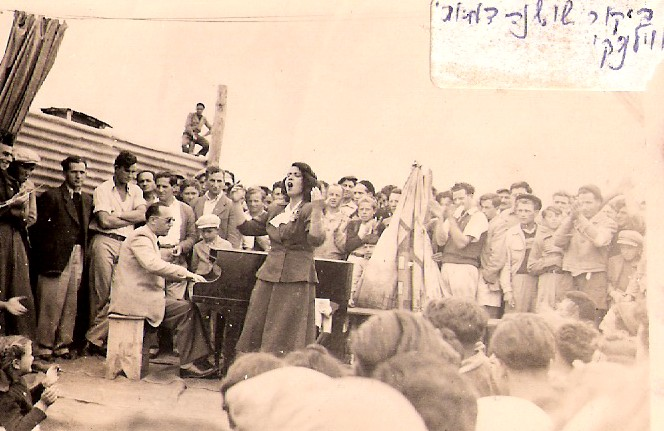
Shoshana performing at a Cyprus internment camp, accompanied by Moshe Wilensky on piano (ca. 1947–48)

Shoshana Damari was born as Shodia Damari on the eve of Passover in Bashar, Yemen as the youngest daughter in a family of five children. Her parents were Lihya-Zachariah and Gazal-Ayla Demari.

Her family arrived by foot at Port Aden and from there arrived in Palestine by train through El Qantara, Egypt on June 15, 1924, when Shoshana was one and a half years old, and settled in Rishon Lezion when Damari was two years old.

From a young age Damari played drums and sang accompaniment for her mother, who performed at family celebrations and gatherings of the Yemenite community in the British Mandate. At age 14, her first songs were broadcast on the radio. She studied singing and acting at the Shulamit Studio in Tel Aviv.

In August 1938 she performed for the first time as a soloist on the radio in Yemenite songs by the poet Shalom Shabazi, accompanied by oud and drums.

In 1939 Damari held her first concert as a soloist, accompanied on the piano by Nahum Nardi.

In February 1940 she married the director of "Shulamit" Shlomo Bosmi, who also served as her artistic agent. On January 27, 1943, the couple had their only daughter, Nava Bosmi. Damari performed as a singer at that time also outside of her activity in "Shulamit".

Damari died in Tel Aviv after a brief bout of pneumonia. She died while Kalaniyot was sung by her family and friends who had been sitting in vigil during her final few days. She was buried in the Trumpeldor Cemetery in Tel Aviv.

== Music career ==
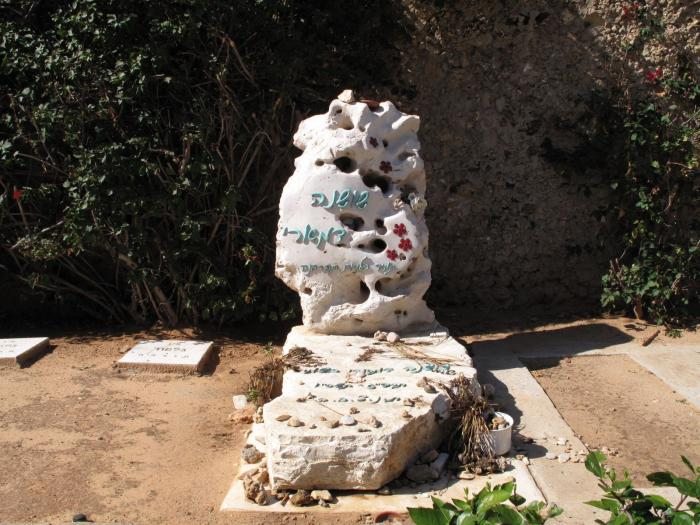
Shoshana Damari's grave in the Trumpeldor Cemetery, Tel Aviv

In 1945, Damari joined Li-La-Lo, a revue theater established by impresario Moshe Wallin. The group performed light entertainment and satire as a counterweight to the serious theater of the time. Damari became known for her distinctive husky voice and Yemenite pronunciation.

During the War of Independence, Damari performed some of the songs that became most associated with the war, such as "The Last Battle", "Bat Sheva" and "Hayu Zmanim" ("There Were Times", to the words of Haim Hefer). Her performances in front of the soldiers made a great impression.

On the eve of the rise of the State of Israel, with Moshe Wilensky, she made an exciting concert tour in the Cyprus internment camps, where she sang the song "The Home" and also a well-known song in Yiddish "Raisins and Almonds" ("Razhinkes mit Mandalen"). She then said that because of the crowd's crying and excitement, she was never able to finish the song to the end.

Soon she became a famous singer and the audience flocked to her performances. Songs that she renewed at that time, "The Van is Driving" (originally by Esther Gamlielit) and "You have to ring twice" (originally from the theater "Kol Haruhot") immediately became identified with her.

Her first record was released in 1948 and her best-known song Kalaniyot (Anemones), by Moshe Wilensky, dates from that period. She was especially popular among Israeli soldiers, for whom she frequently performed. After the independence of Israel and throughout the late 1970s, Damari performed all over the United States, France, England, South Africa, Brazil, Cuba, Mexico, Argentina, Venezuela, Colombia, Canada, Scandinavia and Japan.

In the 1950s Damari was a guest on Moshe Wilensky's radio programs on Kol Israel, where she performed new songs he had composed, such as "The Little Shepherd from the Valley" and "Leor Ha-Zikronot". She also recorded a number of songs by Wilensky and Yehiel Moher, originally performed by the Nahal Band ("Hora Mamtera", "Mul Har Sinai", "Ballad on a Spring and Sea"), and they immediately became more identified with her than with the original performance.

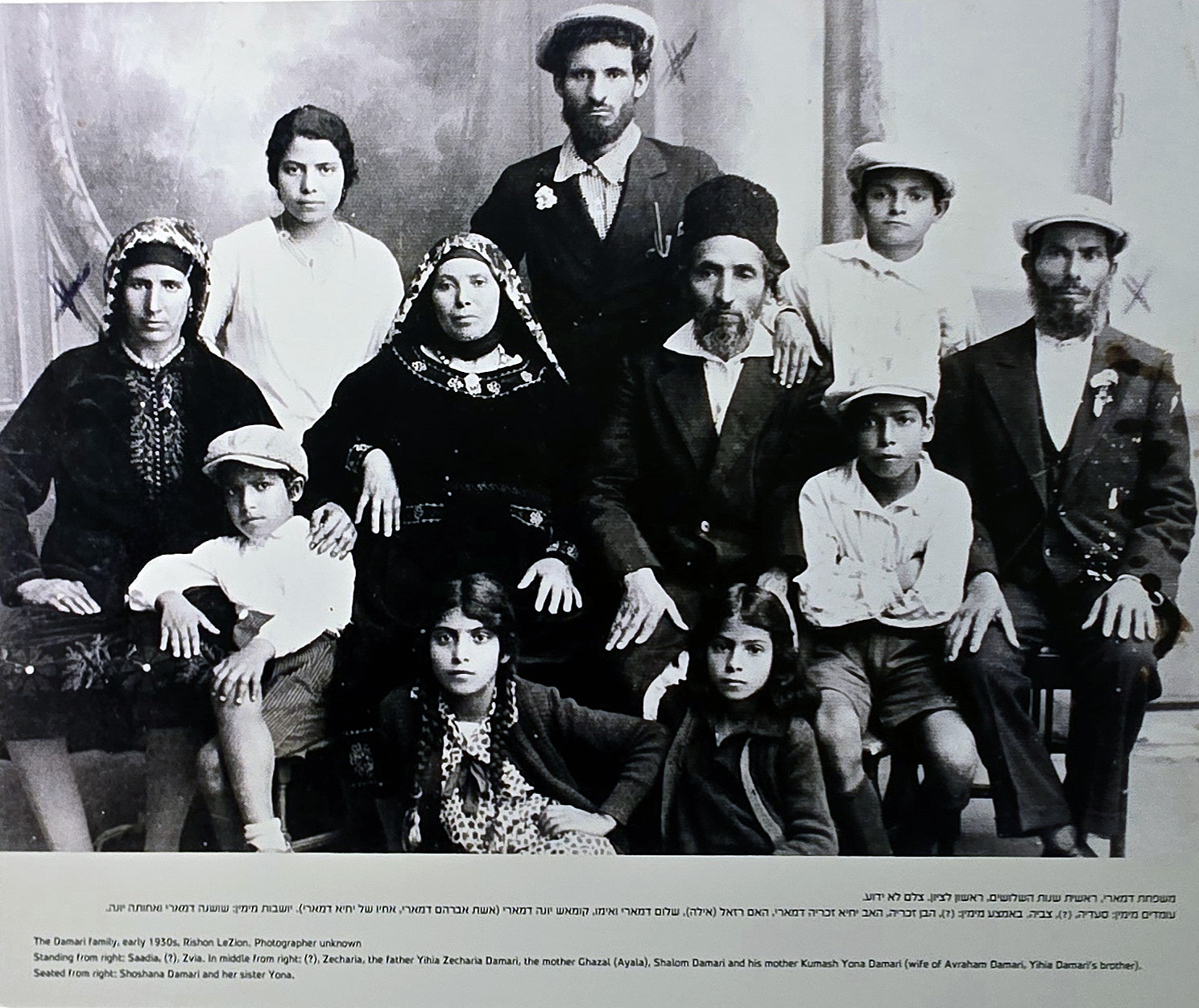
Shoshana Damari (bottom right) and her family in the early 1930s

She was warmly received by the audience at national and international festivals in Israel and abroad, serving as Israel's unofficial cultural ambassador and earning the title of "First lady of Israeli song."

In the mid-1980s Damari teamed up with Boaz Sharabi for a duet that brought her back into the limelight.

In 2005 she recorded two tracks for the Mimaamakim album by Idan Raichel's Project and participated in some of their live performances. The two had been slated to begin another joint project.

== Awards and commemoration ==
In 1988 Damari was awarded the Israel Prize for Hebrew song. She also received an ACUM lifetime achievement award in 1995.

As part of the 60th celebration of the State of Israel in 2008, Damari was chosen as the "singer of the 60th", the most beloved singer in the country's 60 years, in a vote conducted by Channel 1 and Reshet Gimel.

On April 22 2009, the Israeli Stamp Service issued a series of 12 postal stamps on the subject of Israeli music. One of the stamps in this collection was dedicated in memory of Damari. The stamp, with a portrait of Wilensky, was designed by the artist Miri Nestor Sofer. The stamp's tab included a line from Damari's hit song Kalaniyot (Anemones) - "Reddish red anemones".

On March 31, 2013, Google celebrated her 90th birthday with a Google Doodle.

== Film career ==
- Hill 24 Doesn't Answer
- Be'Ein Moledet
- Hatikvah

== See also ==
- List of Israel Prize recipients
- Music of Israel
