= Moshe Wilensky =

Israeli composer

- משה וילנסקי
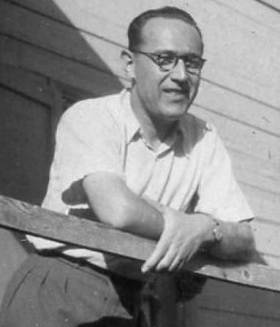
- Born: 17 April 1910; Warsaw, Congress Poland
- Died: 2 January 1997 (aged 86)
- Education: Warsaw Conservatory
- Notable work: Songs: "Kalaniyot" ("Anemones"), "Hayu Zmanim" ("In Those Times)", "Autumn," "Ring Twice and Wait," "Each Day I Lose," "The Last Battle", and "Mul Har Sinai" ("Opposite Mt. Sinai")
- Awards: Israel Prize

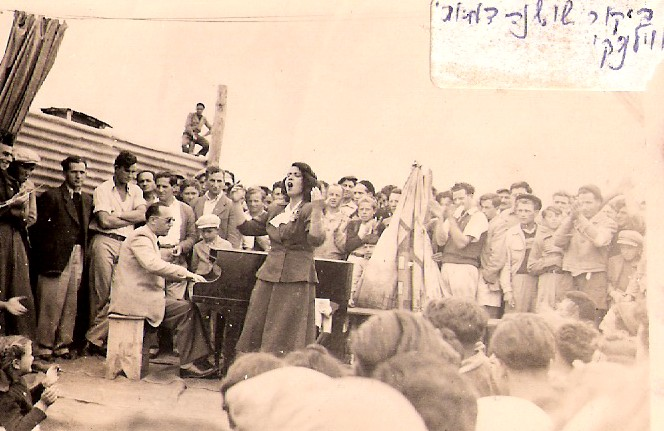
Moshe Wilensky playing piano, entertaining people in DP camps in Cyprus (ca. 1947–48)

Moshe Wilensky (Hebrew: משה וילנסקי, also, "Vilensky"; 17 April 1910 – 2 January 1997) was a Polish-Israeli composer, lyricist, and pianist. He is considered a "pioneer of Israeli song" and one of Israel's leading composers, and was a winner of the 1983 Israel Prize, the state's highest honor.

== Life ==
Wilensky, who was Jewish, was born in Warsaw, Poland in 1910, the son of Zelig and Henia (née Liebman). He studied music at the Warsaw Conservatory in Warsaw, specializing in conducting and composition, and immigrated to Palestine in 1932. He married Bertha Yakimovska in 1939. Wilensky died in 1997.

== Music career ==
A pianist and composer, Wilensky wrote music for theaters and musical troupes of the Israel Defense Forces, including the Nahal choir in the 1950s. He worked with the Kol Yisrael orchestra.

Wilensky's music combines Slavic music and Eastern music. He composed for films, plays, hora dances, cabaret songs, and children's tunes, writing nearly 1,500 songs in his lifetime. Among his songs are "Kalaniyot" ("Anemones"), "Hayu Zmanim" ("In Those Times)", "Autumn," "Ring Twice and Wait," "Each Day I Lose," "The Last Battle", and "Mul Har Sinai" ("Opposite Mt. Sinai"). He wrote music for many of Natan Alterman's poems. In 1962, Israeli Esther Reichstadt won second prize at the Polish international song festival, which Wilensky hosted, with his song "Autumn".

In 1983, Wilensky was awarded the Israel Prize, for Hebrew song (melody). In 1990, a special concert in honor of his 80th birthday was given by the Israel Philharmonic Orchestra. In 1998, the Society of Authors, Composers and Music Publishers in Israel (ACUM) named its Song of the Year Award the "Moshe Wilensky Prize".

In 2005, Vilenski was voted the 187th-greatest Israeli of all time in a poll by the Israeli news website Ynet.

== Commemoration ==
On April 22 2009, the Israeli Stamp Service issued a series of 12 postal stamps on the subject of Israeli music. One of the stamps in this collection was dedicated in memory of Wilensky. The stamp, with a portrait of Wilensky, was designed by the artist Miri Nestor Sofer. The stamp's tab included a line from Wilensky's song "Migdalor" (lighthouse) - "He knew that there was no lighthouse on the beach".

== See also ==
- List of Israel Prize recipients
