= Gvat =

Gvat: גבת (Hebrew)

Hebrew transcription(s)
  - Official: Gevat
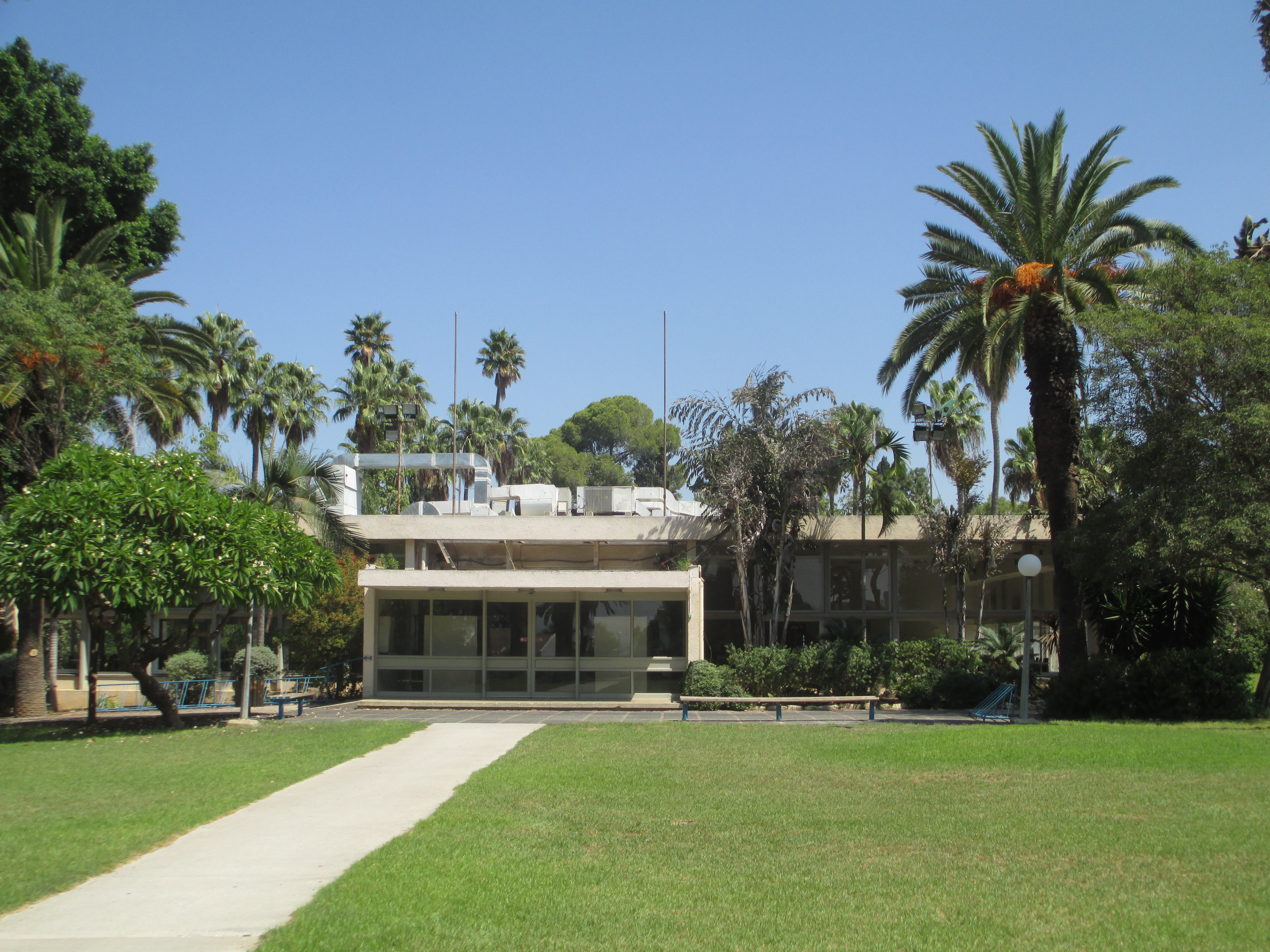
- The kibbutz dining room

- Location within Jezreel Valley region of Israel Location within Israel
- Coordinates: 32°40′31″N 35°12′42″E
- Grid position: 170/231 PAL
- Country: Israel
- District: Northern
- Subdistrict: Jezreel
- Council: Jezreel Valley
- Affiliation: Kibbutz Movement
- Founded: 28 November 1926
- Founder: Belarusian Jews
- Population (2024): 1,124
- Website: www.gvat.org.il

Gvat (Hebrew: גְּבַת, also transliterated Gevat) is a kibbutz in northern Israel. Located near Migdal HaEmek in the Jezreel Valley, it falls under the jurisdiction of Jezreel Valley Regional Council. In 2024 it had a population of 1,124. The kibbutz founded the Plastro company, one of the world's largest drip irrigation systems manufacturers.

== History ==
=== Roman period: Jewish Gabatha ===
Archaeological evidence, including columns and masonry inscribed in Latin, shows that a first-century BCE Judeo-Roman settlement existed at the site.

The Arab village of Jebata and its name were identified with the ancient town of Gabatha, which is mentioned by Eusebius of Caesarea and Jerome as lying within the borders of Diocaesarea near the great plain of Legio or Esdraelon.

=== Ottoman period: Arab Jebata ===
By the modern era, a village by the name of Jebata (also spelt Jabata, Jebatha, Jibbata and Jibta) had been established 25 kilometres southeast of Haifa on a mound in the Galilee, not far from the villages of Yafa an-Naseriyye, al-Mujaydil and Ma'alul, and which Palmer of the Palestine Exploration Fund had wrongly identified with Jotapata.

In the Ottoman era, a map from Napoleon's invasion of 1799 by Pierre Jacotin showed the place, named as Gebat, but the position was misplaced, as that area was not surveyed directly by the French.

In 1875, Victor Guérin gave the population as 350, noting "[i]t is situated upon a low hillock, once occupied by a small tower, of which nothing remains but confused debris. A few cut stones scattered on the slopes and on the upper part of the hill are what is left of the Gabatha mentioned by Jerome in the Onomasticon."

In 1881, the Palestine Exploration Fund's Survey of Western Palestine described Jebata as a small adobe hamlet, containing 80 people and cultivating 21 feddans of land.

Laurence Oliphant wrote of a visit he made to Jebata which was published in the Quarterly Statement of the Palestine Exploration Fund in January 1885. He relates the discovery by the villagers of what appeared to be a large underground tomb, describing a chamber of solid masonry with a vaulted roof and other chambers hewn from the rock.

A population list from about 1887 showed that the village had about 200 inhabitants, all of whom were Muslims. Gottlieb Schumacher, as part of surveying for the construction of the Jezreel Valley railway, noted in 1900 that Jebata had grown considerably; "The proprietor, Sursock, built a number of dwellings covered with tile roofs, cleaned the well on the eastern slope and lined it with masonry."

=== British Mandate ===
At the time of the 1922 census of Palestine, the village had a population of 318; 308 Muslims and 10 Christians, with nine Orthodox and one Armenian Christian.

==== Jewish land purchase ====
The area was acquired by the Jewish community as part of the Sursock Purchase. Jebata was one of five villages purchased by the Jewish National Fund (JNF) in 1924; the others being Afuleh, Sulam, Shatta and Knayfis. The villages had a combined population of about 3,000 to 4,000 people. Because the villagers paid tithes to the Sursock family in Beirut for the right to work the agricultural lands in the villages, they were deemed tenant farmers by the British Mandate authorities in Palestine, and the right of the Sursock family to sell the land to the JNF was upheld by the authorities. The built-up areas of the village, which included people's homes, were not the property of the Sursocks, but without land to cultivate, the transaction left the villagers without their means of livelihood. Jebata was later named by Moshe Dayan in his 1969 statement that there was not a single place in Israel that did not have a former Arab population.

==== Kibbutz Gvat ====
On 28 November 1926 a kibbutz named Gvat was established on the site of Jebata by a group of Fourth Aliyah pioneers from Pinsk. In 1922, the first kibbutz members had formed a kvutza in memory of the 35 members of the Jewish community of Pinsk killed by the Polish Army on 5 April 1919 during the Pinsk massacre. The kibbutz was named after Givta, a town located near Sepphoris during the Second Temple period. In 1931, with the help of the Jewish National Fund and donations from Pinsk's Jewish community, a forest commemorating the victims of the Pinsk massacre was planted near Gvat.

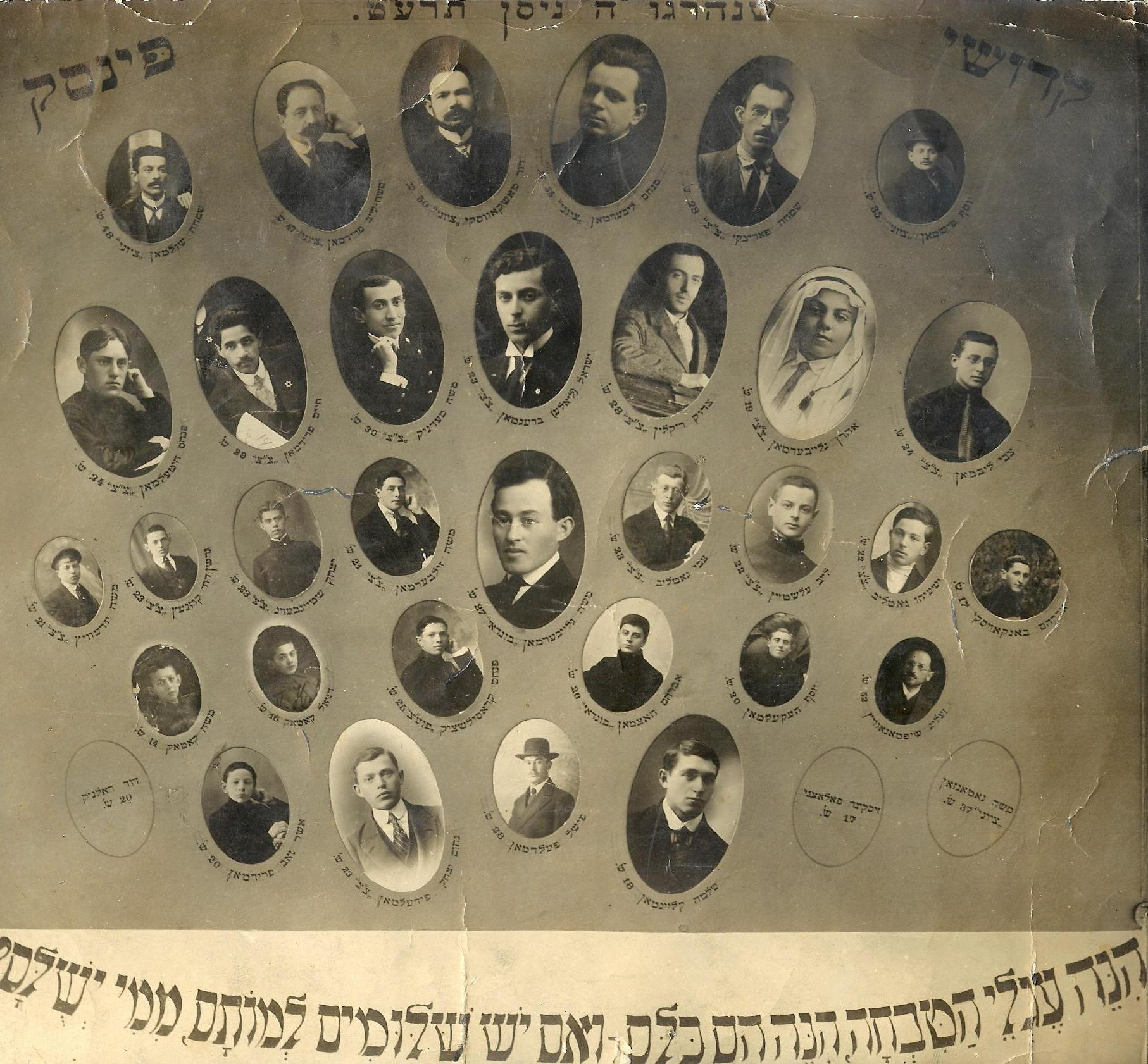
Memorial to the 35 Jews killed in Pinsk 1919

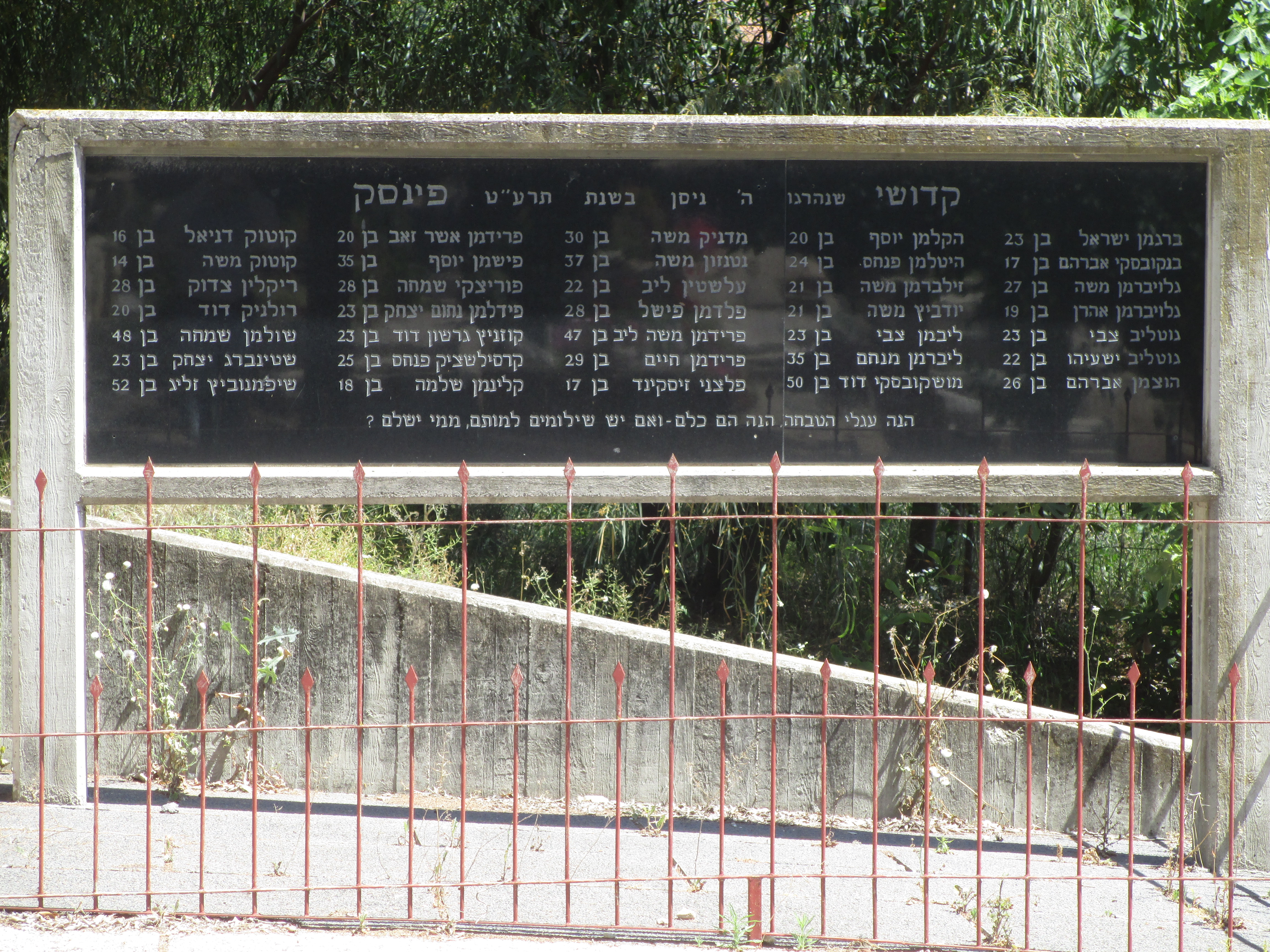
Pinsk massacre memorial in kibbutz Gvat

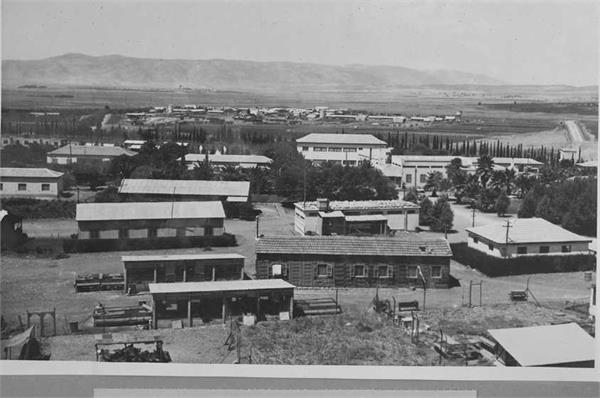
Gvat 1939

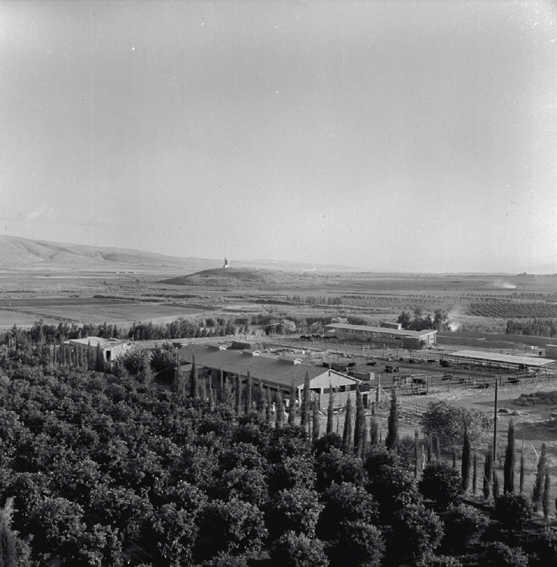
Gvat 1944

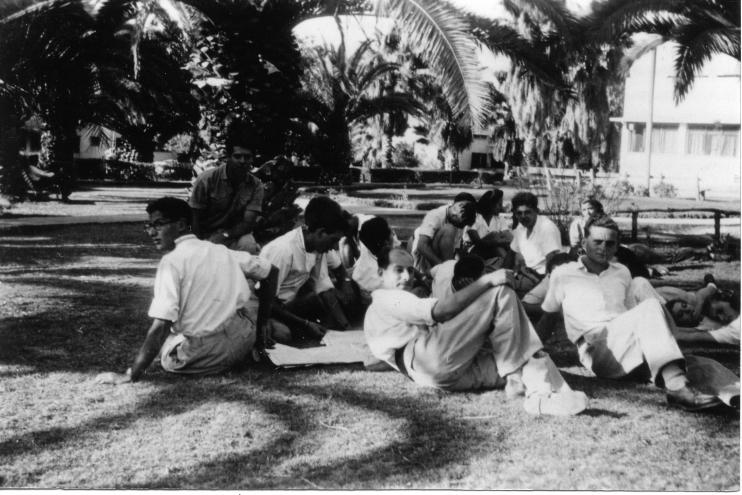
Kibbutz Gvat in 1946

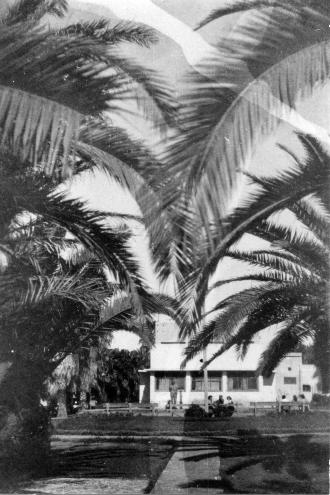
The kibbutz dining room in 1946

The kibbutz was established on classical Labor Zionist principles and there has never been a synagogue in the village. New members arrived, including Poalei Zion members from Pinsk and its surrounding region, as well as by members of HeHalutz from Poland and Germany. By the 1931 census, Gvat had a population of 106; one Muslim and 105 Jews, in a total of 19 houses.

=== State of Israel ===
In 1951, following the split in the HaKibbutz HaMeuhad movement, some of Gvat's members left the kibbutz and together with members of Kvutzat HaSharon founded a new kibbutz named Ihud HaSharon - Gvat, which was later renamed Yif'at in 1952.

On 6 October 1973, during the Yom Kippur War, Soviet-made surface-to-surface FROG-7 missiles launched by Syria struck Gvat, presumably aimed at a nearby airfield. Despite extensive damage to the buildings, there were no casualties, since the inhabitants had been sleeping in underground shelters.

== Demographics ==
Year	Population
1947	~600
1957	604
2006	670

== Economy ==
The irrigation equipment manufacturing company Plastro was established in 1966 by the kibbutz. Plastro is the world's second largest drip irrigation company after Netafim (also from Israel). Plastro and Netafim, together with Israel's other irrigation equipment company NaanDan Irrigation Systems, control roughly half the world market, worth from $1 to $1.5 billion a year.

In 2005 Australian billionaire John Gandel, acquired 50% interest in Plastro Irrigation Systems. But in May 2007 the kibbutz, using a loan from John Deere & Company, exercised an option to buy back the shares.

In 2008 the kibbutz agreed to sell its 75.1% stake at Plastro Irrigation Systems Ltd to John Deere at a company value of NIS 265 million. John Deere was obliged to leave Plastro at the kibbutz employing members for 15 years. Also John Deere agreed to pay Gvat $1.3 million annually over ten years for a non-competition agreement. In exchange the kibbutz agreed to cease receiving management fees for Plastro.

Another sector of Gvat's economy is agriculture. Field crops, citrus fruit, dairy, poultry, ostriches are also farmed and produced in Gvat.

== Culture ==
The kibbutz runs the Bet Herschel theater, named after one of the kibbutz founders, where movies and stage productions are shown. The kibbutz also has a regional sports center.

There are monuments in Gvat commemorating those who perished during the Holocaust and the Pinsk massacre.

Fania Bergstein, a member of Gvat wrote in 1940 the song "about the green truck that picks up milk and eggs from one kibbutz after the other and takes them to the Tnuva factory. The song was published in her book Come to Me, Nice Butterfly and until today is known by virtually every Israeli young child along with other verses from the book.

== Notable people ==
- Fania Bergstein (1908–1950), Hebrew poet
- Haim Gvati (1901–1990), Minister of Agriculture of Israel between 1964 and 1974
- Guni Israeli (born 1984), basketball player
- Daniel Libeskind (born 1946), architect who lived in Gvat between 1960 and 1962

== Bibliography ==
- Barron, J.B., ed. (1923). Palestine: Report and General Abstracts of the Census of 1922. Government of Palestine.
- Conder, C.R.; Kitchener, H.H. (1881). The Survey of Western Palestine: Memoirs of the Topography, Orography, Hydrography, and Archaeology. Vol. 1. London: Committee of the Palestine Exploration Fund.
- Guérin, V. (1880). Description Géographique Historique et Archéologique de la Palestine (in French). Vol. 3: Galilee, pt. 1. Paris: L'Imprimerie Nationale.
- Huneidi, Sahar; Khalidi, W. (2001). A Broken Trust: Herbert Samuel, Zionism and the Palestinians 1920-1925. I.B.Tauris. ISBN 1-86064-172-5.
- Karmon, Y. (1960). "An Analysis of Jacotin's Map of Palestine" (PDF). Israel Exploration Journal. 10 (3, 4): 155–173, 244–253. Archived from the original (PDF) on 2019-12-22.
- Mills, E., ed. (1932). Census of Palestine 1931. Population of Villages, Towns and Administrative Areas. Jerusalem: Government of Palestine.
- Oliphant, L. (1885). "Notes on a tomb opened at Jebata, and on monuments found at Nablus". Quarterly Statement - Palestine Exploration Fund. 17 (2): 94–97. doi:10.1179/peq.1885.17.2.94.
- Palmer, E.H. (1881). The Survey of Western Palestine: Arabic and English Name Lists Collected During the Survey by Lieutenants Conder and Kitchener, R. E. Transliterated and Explained by E.H. Palmer. Committee of the Palestine Exploration Fund.
- Robinson, E. (1843). Bibliotheca Sacra and Theological Review. Allen, Morrill, and Wardwell.
- Robinson, E.; Smith, E. (1841). Biblical Researches in Palestine, Mount Sinai and Arabia Petraea: A Journal of Travels in the year 1838. Vol. 3. Boston: Crocker & Brewster.
- Rogan, E.; Shlaim, A. (2001). The War for Palestine: Rewriting the History of 1948. Cambridge University Press. ISBN 0-521-79476-5.
- Roller, Duane W. (1998). The Building Program of Herod the Great. University of California Press. ISBN 0-520-20934-6.
- Schumacher, G. (1888). "Population list of the Liwa of Akka". Quarterly Statement - Palestine Exploration Fund. 20: 169–191.
- Schumacher, G. (1900). "Reports from Galilee". Quarterly Statement - Palestine Exploration Fund. 32 (4): 355–360. doi:10.1179/peq.1900.32.4.355.
