= Knivsta =

Town in Uppsala County, Sweden

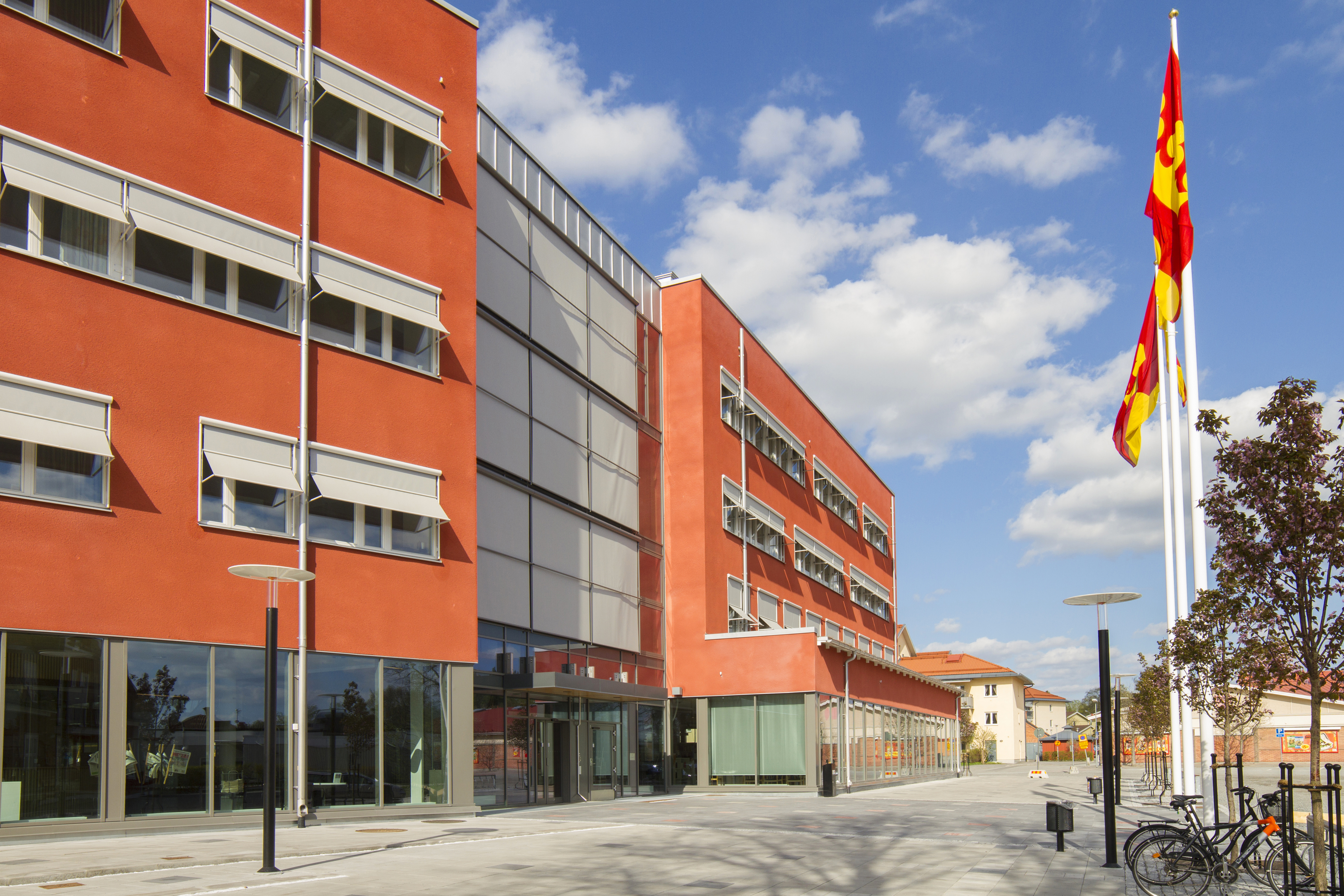

- Coat of arms

- Location within Uppsala Location within Sweden
- Coordinates: 59°43′N 17°48′E
- Country: Sweden
- Province: Uppland
- County: Uppsala County
- Municipality: Knivsta Municipality

Area
  - Total: 4.21 km^{2} (1.63 sq mi)

Population (22 February 2023)
  - Total: 20,133
  - Density: 1,683/km^{2} (4,360/sq mi)
- Time zone: UTC+1 (CET)
  - Summer (DST): UTC+2 (CEST)
- Postcode: S-741 75
- Area code: 018
- Website: www.knivsta.se

Knivsta is a locality and the seat of Knivsta Municipality, Uppsala County, Sweden with 20,167 inhabitants. It is known for being one of the safest areas in Sweden, consistently ranking among the top 5 safest municipalities (out of 290) for more than a decade.

== Geography ==
The town sits on the Stockholm-Uppsala railway 48 km north from Stockholm and 18 km south from Uppsala, and has a station in the heart of the town.

== History ==
There originally was a timber industry in Knivsta. At the location of the former sawmill, there are plans (as of 2007) to erect new apartment and business buildings. Knivsta has a small centre, where there is a library, some banks, shops, restaurants, cafés and the Knivsta railway station. In nearby areas there is also a sport and swimming hall. The Knivsta Municipality is often thought as expansive, because of the frequent immigration, mostly to the nearby town of Alsike. Many residents commute to Uppsala, Stockholm, or Arlanda.

Knivsta's old church, or Saint Stephen's Church, was built in the 14th century and is located south of the town centre.

== Famous people ==
Famous residents of Knivsta include artist Carl Milles (born at Örby Gård Lagga, his father was Emil "Mille" Andersson). Milles's statue by the Lagga church represents angels playing at his mother's grave. Other famous residents include composer Emil Sjögren, and artist Olof Thunman, whom Knivsta's largest school has been named after. Thunman's works include, for example, Vi gå över daggstänkta berg. The sportsman Gösta "Knivsta" Sandberg is from Knivsta, and has played for the Swedish national league in bandy, football and ice hockey in the 1950s and 1960s. In later years, many ice hockey players from Knivsta IK have become successful players both in Sweden and abroad. Former child actress Julia Winter previously resided here with her family. Famous comedian Soran Ismail is also from Knivsta.

== Sport ==
Today, there is a lot of sport in Knivsta's clubs Knivsta IK, Knivsta CK, SK Vide, Lagga IF, Vassunda IF and Långhundra IF. These clubs, both old and new, have about 15-20 full-time jobs in the municipality. These clubs are active in handball, football, table tennis, skiing, bandy and many more. Other organised sports in Knivsta include riding, judo, shooting, cycling and swimming.

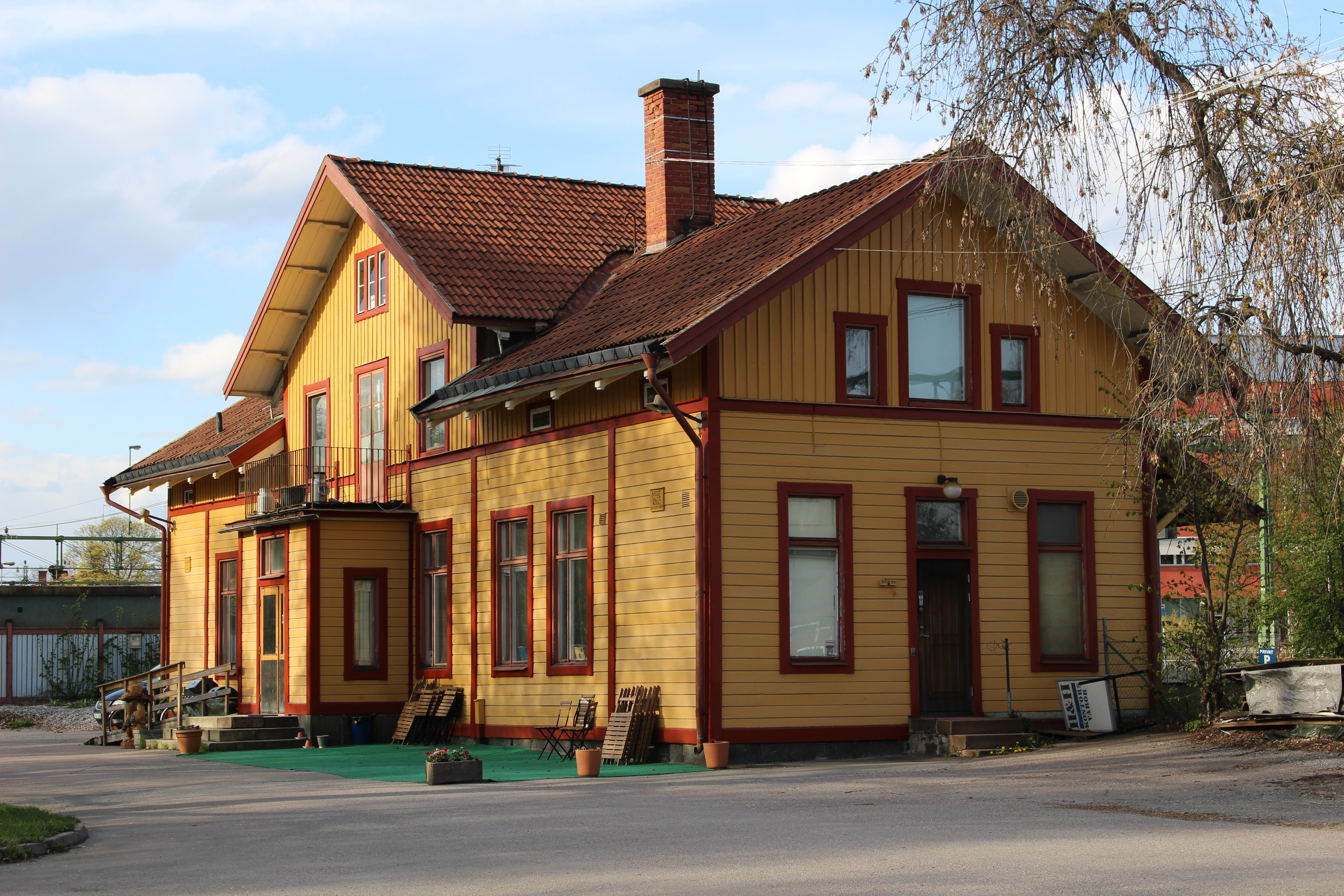

== Gallery ==
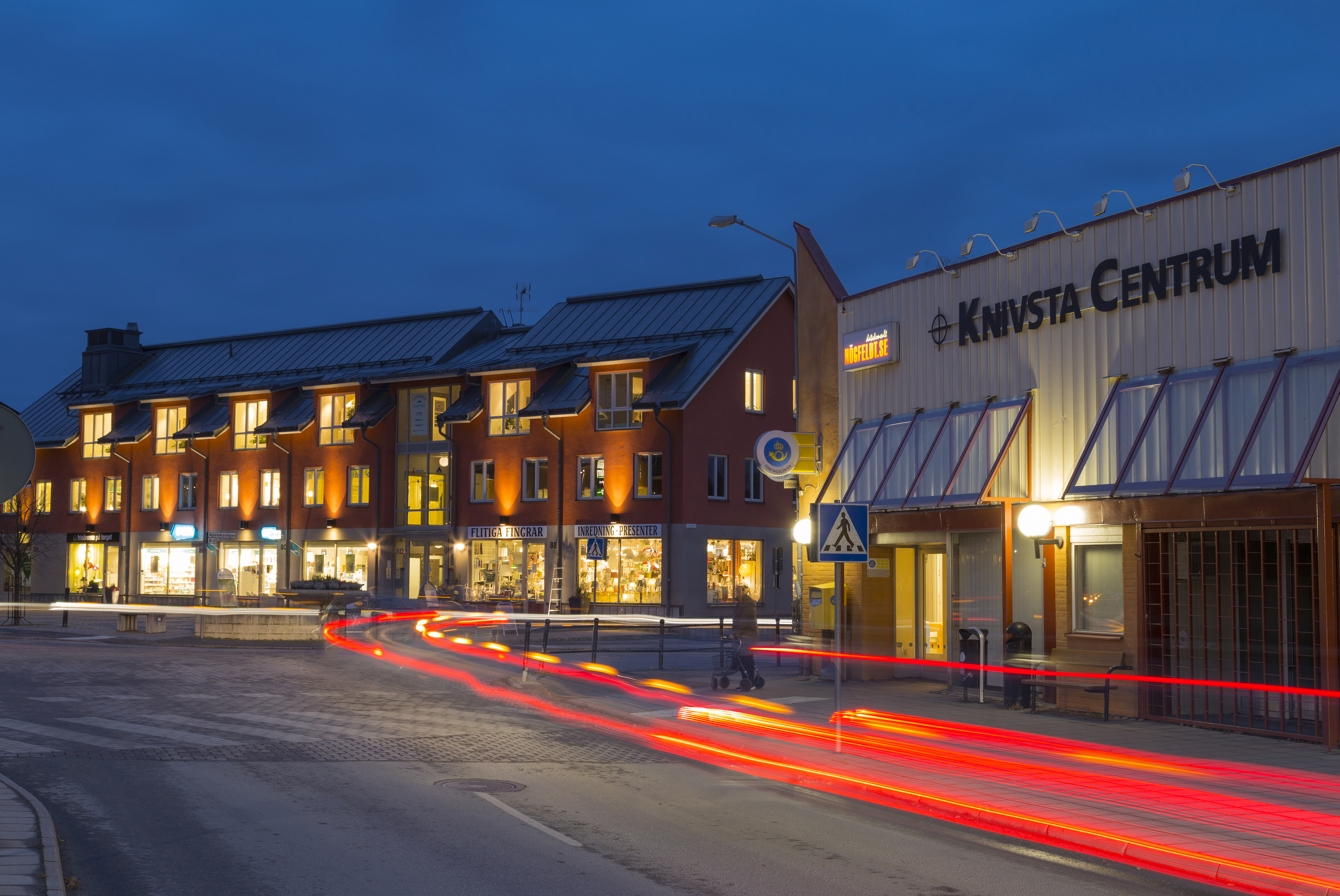
Knivsta at night

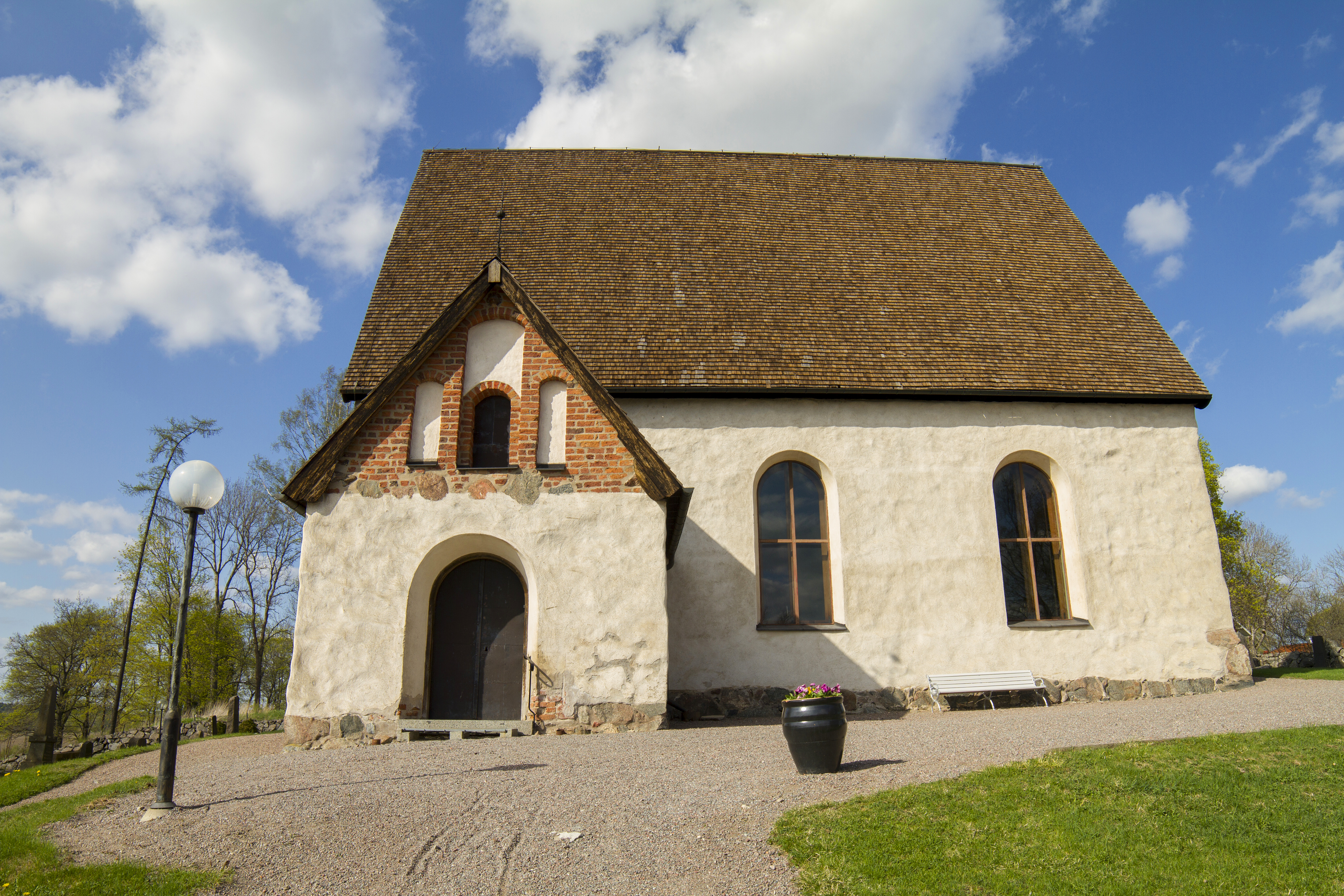
St Stephen's Church in Knivsta
