= Galia Yishai =

Israeli actress and singer (1950–2020)

- גליה ישי
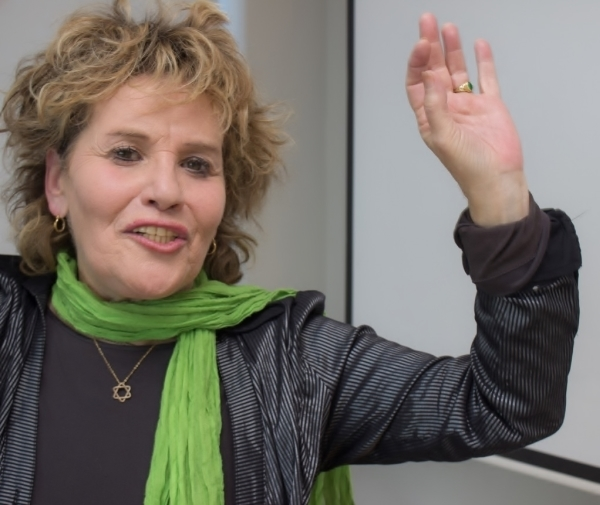
- Yishai in 2016
- Born: 17 May 1950; Tel Aviv, Israel
- Died: 4 January 2020 (aged 69); Tel Aviv, Israel
- Occupation: Actress
- Years active: 1966–2020

Galia Yishai (Hebrew: גליה ישי; 17 May 1950 – 4 January 2020) was an Israeli actress of film, stage and television and singer. She began performing from the age of 16-and-a-half on the radio programme First Returns and acted on stage at most of Israel's repertoire theatres such as the Habima Theatre, the Bimot Theatre, the Cameri Theater, Haifa Theatre and Beit Lessin Theater. Yishai acted in several film and television programmes from 1971 to her death in 2020.

== Early life and education ==
On 17 May 1950, Yishai was born in Tel Aviv. Her mother worked in advertising and her father was an Etzel fighter who co-established the Freedom Movement. Yishai had two siblings and grew up in Tel Aviv. Following her graduation from high school, she went to the Beit Zvi School for the Performing Arts.

== Career ==
Yishai began her career at the age of 16-and-a-half when she earned acceptance to perform on the radio show First Returns and performed a song in the programme's chorus troupe. She was a military graduate of the Central Command Band, having spent three-and-a-half years there, and performing in its Come to Us in the Valley programme in 1969. Yishai then continued to study acting at Tel Aviv University and in New York.

Upon being released from the Central Command troupe, Yishai joined the cast of the Habima Theatre. She also worked in most Israeli repertoire theatres, including with the Bimot Theatre, the Cameri Theater, Haifa Theatre and Beit Lessin Theater. Yishai had roles in such plays as Napoleon – alive or dead!, Was a Graceful Man, The Crazy of Jaffa, Peer Gynt, Everything is Relative, Crazy those who are not crazy, Finance, All My Sons, Quo Vadis as well as the children's play Puss in Boots. In 1970, she joined the female Fourth Girls of the Theater Club troupe and performed alongside Hana Laszlo, Miki Kam and Adi Lev and also worked opposite her friend Tzipi Mor. Yishai also performed on stage in foreign countries such as France, Switzerland and the United States.

Yishai was a writer of songs, and was signed to the CBS Records International record label. She participated in the 1970 Israel Song Festival, in the "Carousel" collection performing the song So Scattered. She performed in the centenary events of Ben-Gurion Day, won first prize performing the song Aya in the Israeli Children's Song Festival and was at the Barby Club in Tel Aviv in 2005 as a stage rock singer. Yishai lent her voice as the narrator of classical music records for children such as Ludwig van Beethoven, Frédéric Chopin, Richard Strauss and Wolfgang Amadeus Mozart, and with the actor Yossi Gerber, was on the classical children's records Trip in the Land of the Notes, Tiff and Taff Numbers and Klesitaf. She authored a children's illustrated poet book, Ketesh Choshem, in 1979. Yishai was a member of the Israeli Artists' Association.

She also worked as an actress in both film and television. Yishai portrayed Naomi in the 1971 film The Highway Queen, Kinneret Kinneret in 1974 and The Honey Knot in 1977. She and Mor were part of the programme Moment and Waves for several years. In 1981, Yishai played in Am Yisrael Hai, Without Secrets in 1984, had an appearance as herself in Rechov Sumsum in 1986, the educational role of Pingy in Parpar Nechmad in 1997, a member of the adoption committee in Ramat Aviv Gimel in the same year, in The Good Guys two years later, Crocodile Toffee in Sophie Toffee in 2001, in Intensive Care in 2003, Tzila in The Heart of Amalia in 2005, the principal in Life is Not Everything the following year, When Will We Kiss and played the role of Yael in Maybe This Time both in 2007, and portrayed the part of Yair's mother Five Men and a Wedding in 2008.

In 2009, she played the part of a witness in Weeping Susannah, Dina in Room Service and Sigal Varicose Veins in Kofiko. Yishai was cast as Mirabelle in Gerushim Niflaim and as a teacher in Kan Garim Bekef in 2010, the mother of Avery in Srugim two years later, the school principal in Hunting Elephants in 2013, Ruthie Silesh in HaKalmarim in 2014 and as Celine in Inertia a year later. During 2016, she played the part of Dalia Metzger in Irreversible, Dikla in Ikaron HaHachlafa, Nehama Resnik in Antenna and was in Tzomet Miller. Yishai played Smadar in Haverot and Light in The Good Cop in 2017. She went on to portray Eve in Kupa Rashit and in HaMenatzeah both in 2018 as well as Yona in Metumtemet, Dalia Cassuto in Kfula and was in BatEl HaBetula in 2019. Yishai's final two roles were as Ilana in Morobot and was in The Great Special Thing both of which were broadcast in 2020.

== Death ==
On 4 January 2020, aged 69, Yishai died at Tel Aviv Sourasky Medical Center, approximately one month after being diagnosed with cancer. Her funeral took place at Yarkon Cemetery in Petah Tikva on the afternoon of the following day.
