= Shlomo Shriki =

Israeli artist

Shlomo Shriki (Hebrew: שלמה שריקי; 1949-2022; born in Morocco), was an Israeli painter and artist, grew up and was educated in Kibbutz Yifat. Shriki worked and exhibited in various museums, mainly in the Netherlands and the U.S., he is a pioneer and developer of subconscious calligraphy. His practice is closely related to the "automatism form of surrealist art. Shriki is also known as video artist with regular exhibition in Saatchi Gallery. Shriki is known as well as creator of political caricatures which caused some global protest. His paintings are rarely sold to private collectors and he is an avid donor of his works for charitable causes.

The last exhibition of Shlomo Shriki took place in the Kastra Museum in Haifa, Israel, 2003. Israeli art critic Leah Etgar while interviewing the artist chose to outline his comment "sometimes it is more important to know what to erase rather than what to paint". This attitude reflects in a very clear way the artists philosophy, that is the main drive behind his creation.

== Record breaking sale ==
In the beginning of May 2009, Shriki broke a record sale price when his work "L'Orchestra" was sold to a Chinese collector in Hong Kong for the staggering price of 1.25 Million $ US. LATE EXHIBITION: Shlomo Shriki Retrospective, full retrospective of his work including paintings, sculpture, photografy and video. February 2012, Yifat Gallery. Including works loaned by King Hassan collection, Shimon Peres collection, Shalom Bauchman collection.
