= Yifat, Israel =

Yifat: יִפְעַת (Hebrew)
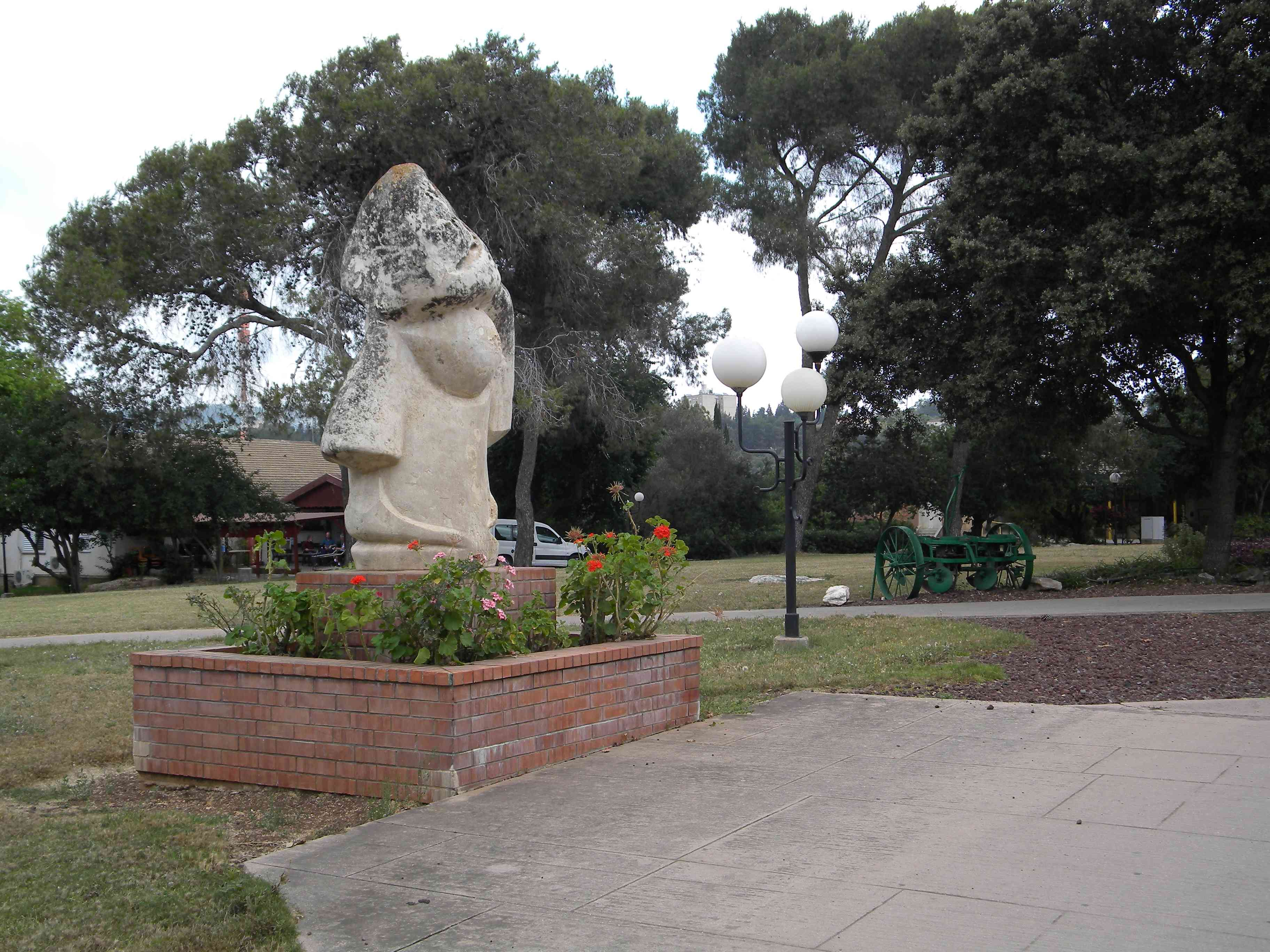

- Location within Jezreel Valley region of Israel Location within Israel
- Coordinates: 32°40′35″N 35°13′28″E
- Country: Israel
- District: Northern
- Subdistrict: Jezreel
- Council: Jezreel Valley
- Affiliation: Kibbutz Movement
- Founded: 1954
- Founder: Former Residents of Ramat David and Gevat
- Population (2024): 1,334
- Website: Official website https://www.yifat.org.il/

Yifat (Hebrew: יִפְעַת, more accurately romanized as "Yif'at") is a kibbutz in Galilee, northern Israel. Located adjacent to the town Migdal HaEmek and short distances from the cities of Afula and Nazareth. It falls under the jurisdiction of Jezreel Valley Regional Council. In 2024 it had a population of 1,334.

== History ==
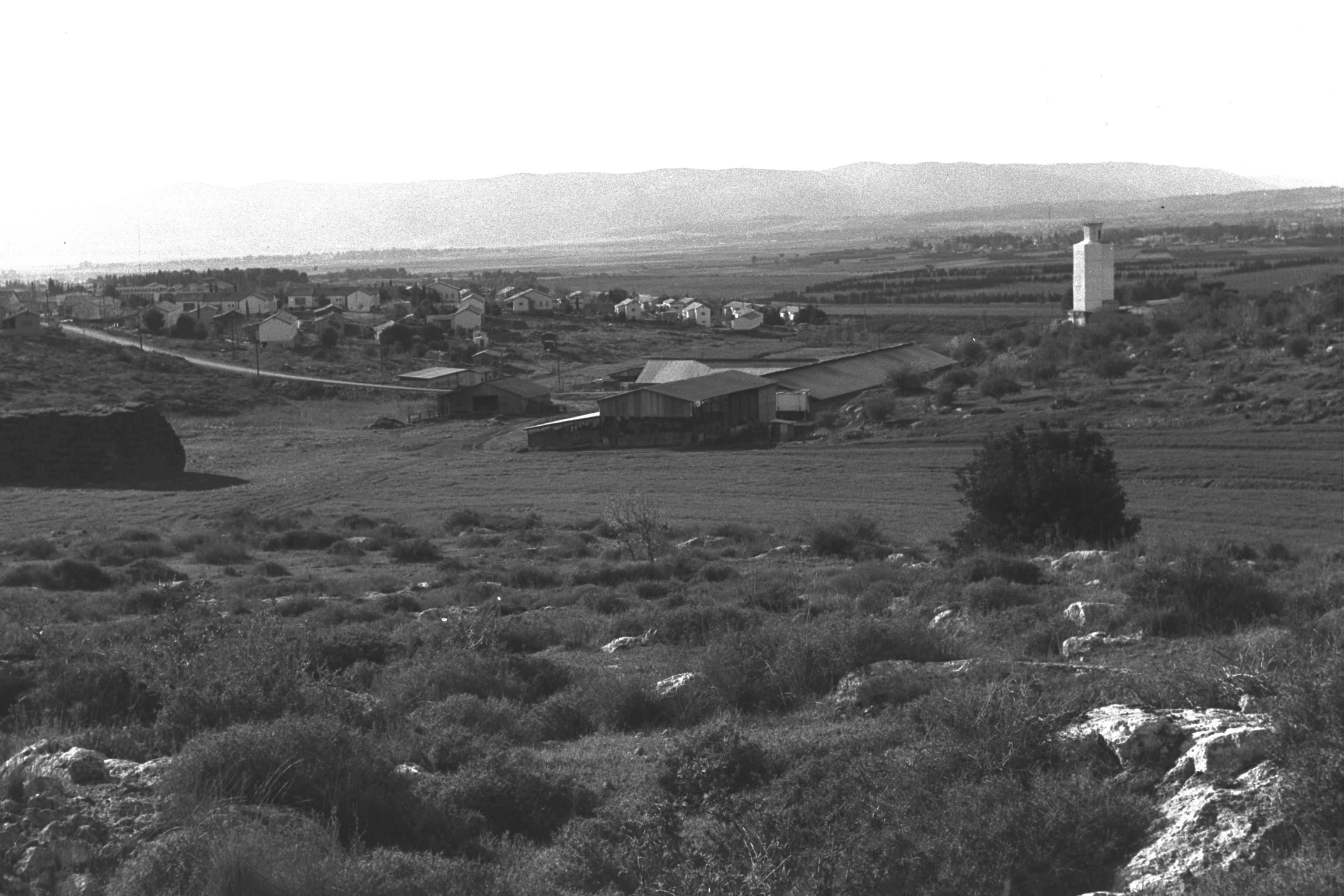
Kibbutz Yifat, 1960

The kibbutz was established in 1954 by members of Kvutzat HaSharon who previously lived in Ramat David, as well as former residents of Gevat, including Haim Gvati, later a government minister. It was located on land near the former depopulated Arab village of Al-Mujaydil. It was initially named Ihud HaSharon - Gevat, but was later renamed after the biblical town of Yefia (Joshua 19:12), as does the name of the Arab town of Yafa an-Naseriyye.

== Economy ==
The economy of Yifat is based on light industry, agriculture, greenhouses, plant nurseries, cattle, sheep, and chickens, as well as the hospitality industry. The sixth-grade school “Western Valley” and a performing arts complex are located within the kibbutz, as is the Pioneer Settlement Museum.

Yifat houses a Hebrew ulpan for immigrants and would-be immigrants. Furthermore, Jewish and Gentile “volunteers” from many countries have served on the kibbutz. In earlier days, Yifat welcomed non-Jews from Germany among its visitors when some kibbutzim discriminated even against those born after World War II.

== See also ==
- Shlomo Shriki
