= Maria Gurevich =

Israeli puppet designer

Maria Gurevich (Hebrew: מריה גורביץ; born October 8, 1964) is an Israeli puppet designer known for creating puppets in many TV programs for children and adults, as well as in theatre plays and commercials.

In 1983 she graduated from the Moscow College of Art In 1990 she immigrated to Israel with her 10-month old son Dan, while son's father remained in the Soviet Union. Earlier her parents were permitted to emigrate, and they prepared an apartment for her in Rehovot. Later she moved to Ramat Gan. She was earning her living by giving art lessons to children and manufacturing puppets for orders.

On the third year in Israel she was invited to make puppets for the TV show he:המחסן של כאילו and her mouse "made from a floor rag" was used in he:גינת ההפתעות. After that she made puppets for many other TV shows.

In addition, later she began teaching at the Puppet Theater Schools in Holon and Ramat Aviv.

She married Sergey and they had daughter Esther-Arina (אסתר-ארינה).

A student of her founded a puppet company in New York, and she started receiving orders from him from many other countries.

== TV shows ==
Below is a list of TV shows that used Maria Gurevich's dolls

- Little Monsters at Channel 13
- 2002-2003: Dafna and Dudidu
- 2021: Parpar Nechmad, new dolls for the 2021 reboot
- 2022: Eli the Cat

== Awards ==
- 2008: Children and Youth Stage Award in puppet and accessory designer category
- 2007: Children and Youth Stage Award in puppet and accessory designer category
