= Parpar Nechmad =

1984 Israeli children's television series

- פרפר נחמד
- Genre: Children's television series; Educational; Puppetry
- Created by: Shoshana Tzachor
- Directed by: Yael Graf; Titi Ax; Arie Ben Zion; Bobby Lax
- Presented by: Dudu Zar (original series); Uzi Hitman (original); Ofra Wingerten (original); Shlomit Hagoel-Triger (original); Ofra Haza (original); Effi Ben Israel (original); Adva Edni (original); Guy Fridman (original); Elanor Aaron (original); Rama Messinger (original); Meshi Klinstein (reboot); Uri Banay (reboot); Ester Rada (reboot); Ben Yosifobich (reboot)
- Voices of: Ayelet Levin; Irit Shila; Itzik Gayar; Gilles Ben David; Avi Yakir; Yoni Chen; Tzlila Yanai; Galia Yishai; Ami Weinberg
- Country of origin: Israel
- Original language: Hebrew
- No. of seasons: 17
- No. of episodes: 212

Production
- Executive producer: Shoshana Tzachor
- Producer: Einat Dekel-Weitzman
- Running time: 25 minutes
- Production companies: Israeli Educational Television (seasons 1-16); Sumayoko Ltd. KAN Networks (season 17-present)

Original release
- Network: Israeli Educational Television
- Release: 31 March 1984 – 2004
- Network: Kan Educational
- Release: 5 September 2021 – present

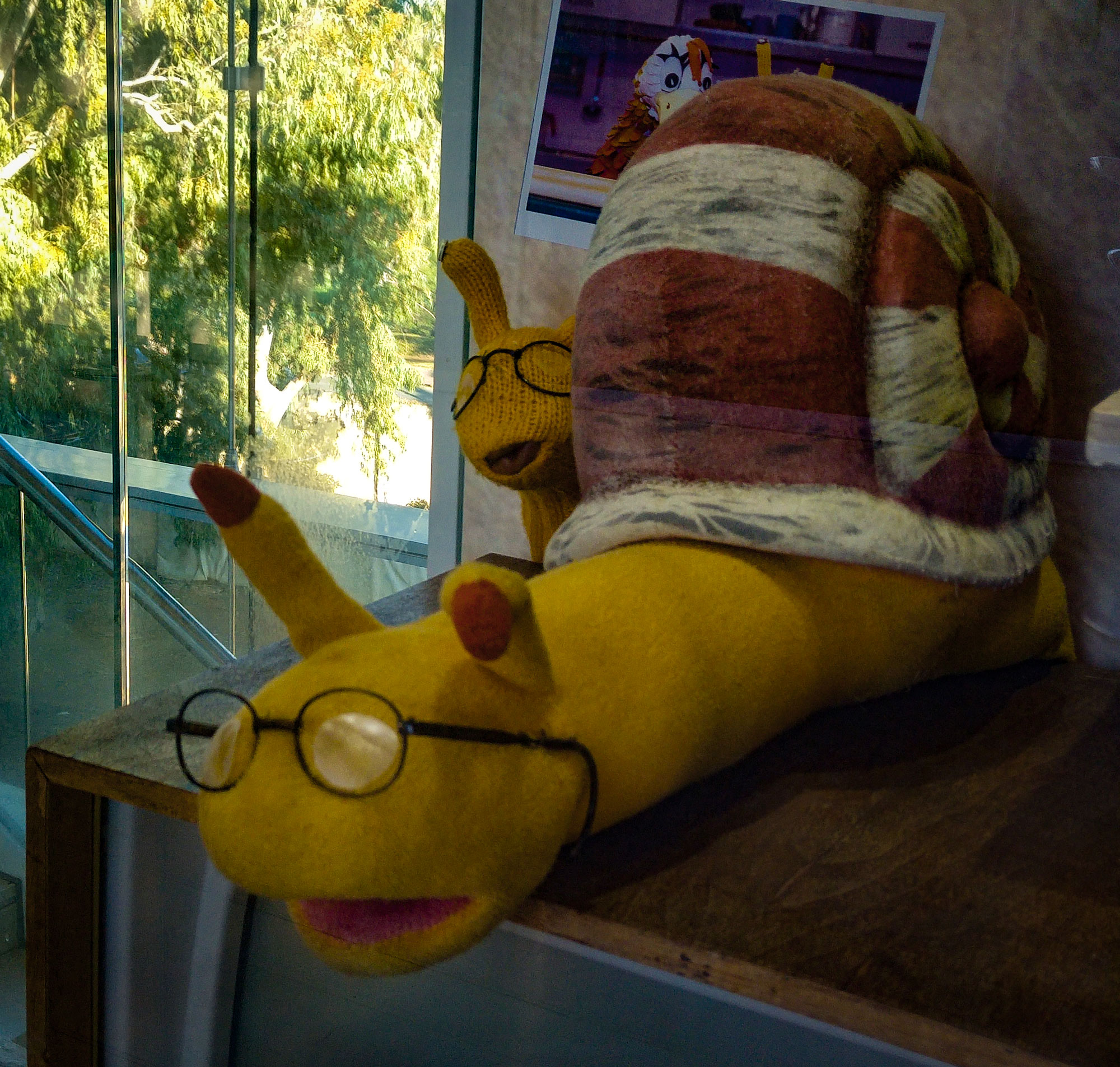
Shabi the snail. one of the main characters in Parpar Nechmad

Parpar Nechmad (Hebrew: פרפר נחמד, Nice Butterfly) is a long-running Israeli children's television programme, aimed mainly at pre-school children. The series premiered in January 1982 and ran until 2004. It was produced by Israeli Educational Television (IETV), and to this day, remains successful in repeats on IETV's former home network, Channel 23, and via a reboot of the series that debuted on 5 September 2021 on Kan Educational.

The programme was originally produced by Shoshana Tzachor. Its head writer was Datia Ben Dor, who provided scripts for most of the early shows, as well as lyrics and music to many of the featured songs. The puppets were all designed by Yehudit Greenspan. The show's title refers to a then well-known nursery rhyme by Fania Bergstein, "Come to Me, Nice Butterfly".

== Overview ==
The series consists of interactions between humans and puppets. Each episode presents young viewers with familiar situations from everyday life, and offers creative ways of solving various problems, as each situation is dealt with through songs and games. Aside from the basic plotline, most episodes also include a story told by one or more of the human actors, and sometimes short cartoon sketches. In the sketches about Pete and Pitagoras (different actors) Professor Pitagoras tried to teach the kids but his assistant Pete always ruined everything.

The location for most episodes (until 1995) is a room filled with various shapes, such as poles and arches, vaguely resembling a room in a house. This deliberately surreal design is meant to give the impression of seeing the world from a child's point of view, which is full of imagination and creativity.

== Reboot ==
In 1995, the programme's production was put on a long hiatus following the death of Yoni Chen, one of the puppeteers. It was relaunched in 1998 with a complete overhaul. It now had a realistic house and backyard as the two main locations, the puppets were redesigned and there were considerable changes with the human cast as well.

Responses for the new version were mostly negative. Original creator Datia Ben Dor said in an interview (translation from Hebrew is non-literal): "The work on the show was no longer done with the proper care and sensitivity... it was no longer "Parpar Nechmad"... the name remained but the essence was gone". The second version aired its final episode in 2004.

On 18 July 2008, it was first revealed that Israeli Educational Television planned to reboot the show again, and that auditions for the new human cast would soon take place. Reportedly, all four puppet characters would appear on the new version, which would focus on teaching children about good nutrition and health. After some time, the new version was cancelled.

In February 2020, it was announced that IPBC planned to reboot the show after 16 years of repeats on Kan Educational.

On 5 April 2021, it was announced that the second reboot would air in late 2021 on Kan Educational with four new hosts - Meshi Kleinstein, Uri Banai, Ester Rada and Ben Yosipovich. Ami Weinberg and Ayelet Levine will return to perform Batz and Nuli, Shabi will performed by Gilles Ben David instead of Avi Yakir and Uza will performed by Meital Raz instead of Irit Shilo. The puppets were all redesigned by Maria Gurevich.

The revival series premiered on Kan Educational on 5 September 2021.

== Cast ==
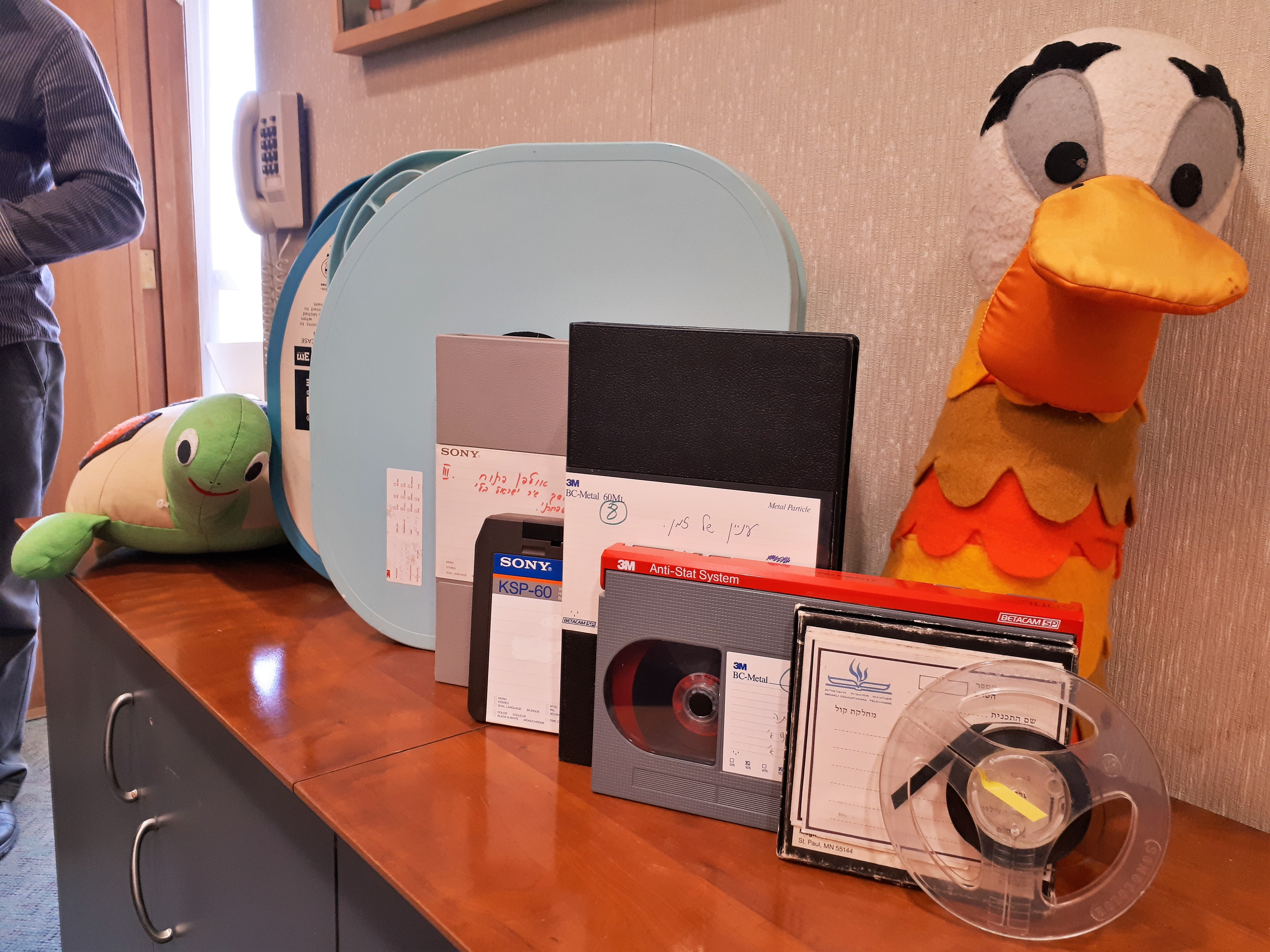
Uza, Batz, and recordings cassettes at the IETV building

=== Puppet Characters ===
- Uza (אוזה) (performer: Irit Shilo / Meital Raz) - A female goose. She is very clever and a fast learner. Her character traits are those of a know-it-all big sister.
- Shabi (שבי) (performer: Itzik Gier / Avi Yakir / Gilles Ben David) – A male snail who wears round glasses. He is intelligent, but slightly insecure. He tends to rely on Uza for answers.
- Batz (בץ) (performer: Yoni Chen / Ami Weinberg) – A male turtle. He is a rather slow thinker, but far from being dumb.
- Nuli (נולי) (performer: Ayelet Levine / Tzlila Yanai) – A female chick. The youngest of the puppets, she is inquisitive and gets excited easily. Her name is not related to her species. She is named after Nuli Omer.
- Pingi (פינגי) (performer: Galia Yishai) – A human-sized penguin. He joins the show in later episodes as an immigrant from the North Pole, and is very curious and friendly, yet tends to be obnoxious at times. His character was excluded from the new version, mostly because most viewers found him annoying. For example, he really wanted glasses but after he got a couple (actually fake glasses) he really wanted a moustache.

=== Human actors ===
- Effi Ben Israel
- Uzi Hitman
- Dudu Zar
- Ofra Weingarten
- Shlomit Hagoel
- Guy Friedman
- Elinor Aharon
- Rama Messinger
- Ofra Haza (frequent guest in early episodes)

==== 2021 Edition ====
- Meshi Kleinstein
- Uri Banai
- Ester Rada
- Ben Yossipovich
- Ido Mosseri
