= Yoni Chen =

Israeli actor (1953–1995)

- יוני חן
- Born: Yonatan Hanono; 10 August 1953; Tel Aviv, Israel
- Died: 27 June 1995 (aged 41); Tel Aviv, Israel
- Occupations: Actor; voice actor; director; puppeteer
- Years active: 1978–1995

Yoni Chen (Hebrew: יוני חן; 10 August 1953 – 27 June 1995) was an Israeli actor, voice actor, director and puppeteer.

== Biography ==
Chen was born in Israel to a Syrian Jewish family. When he was two years old, he and his family lived in Cuba for five years. After reaching adolescence, Chen attended the Thelma Yellin High School in Givatayim to study drama, then he worked for the Israel Defense Forces. He began his career in 1978 performing on stage at the Cameri Theatre and the Orna Porat Children's Theatre. That same year, he made his debut film appearance in The Band and appeared in other films over the next several years such as Dizengoff 99.

Among Chen's most popular roles was on the children's puppet show Parpar Nechmad, in which he performed the character Batz the Turtle.

As a voice actor, Chen was heavily involved in the Hebrew language dubbing of Looney Tunes. He performed the Hebrew voices of Sylvester, The Tasmanian Devil and Elmer Fudd. Other roles Chen performed included Morten, Gusta and Gorgo in The Wonderful Adventures of Nils, Tin Man in The Wonderful Wizard of Oz, Yogi Bear in The Yogi Bear Show, all characters in Tip en Tap, several characters in The Smurfs and many more. Chen also founded a dubbing company which was then later acquired by Elrom Studios after his death.

=== Personal life ===
Chen was openly gay. His partner, Ari worked for Israeli Educational Television.

== Death ==
On 27 June 1995, Chen died after suffering from AIDS for some time. He was nearing his 42nd birthday. Parpar Nechmad underwent a hiatus for a while and eventually, the role of Batz was passed on to Ami Weinberg.
