= Vi gå över daggstänkta berg =

Swedish folk song by Edwin Ericson and Olof Thunman

Song
- Language: Swedish
- Published: 1908 (text published 1906)
- Songwriter: Olof Thunman
- Composer: Edwin Ericsson

Vi gå över daggstänkta berg ("We walk over dew-sprinkled mountains") is a Swedish folk song, whose lyrics were written by Olof Thunman. The melody is of disputed origin, but is attributed to Edwin Ericsson.

== Background ==
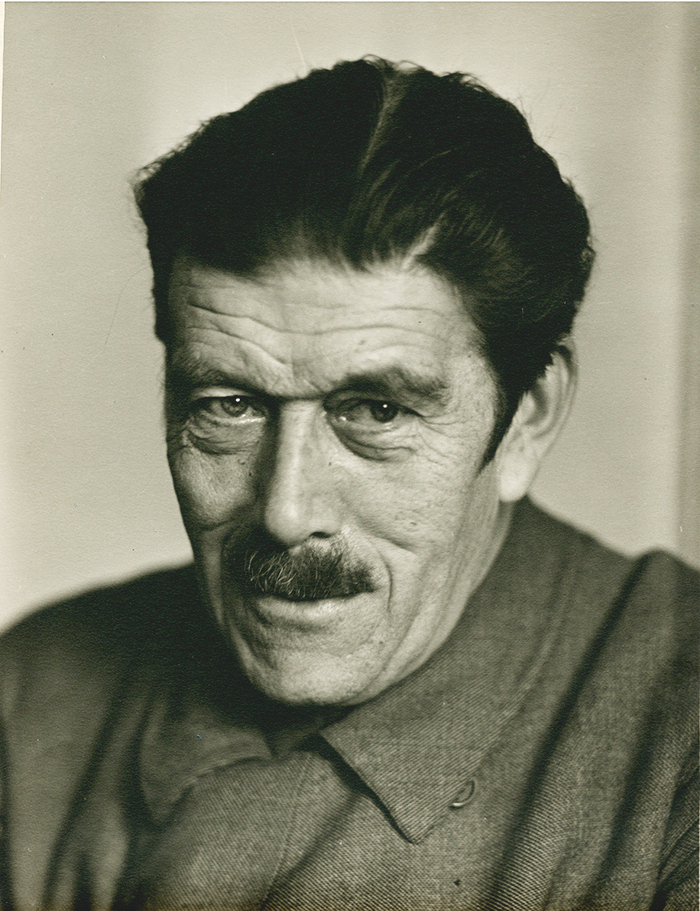
Olof Thunman

Olof Thunman was an enthusiastic hiker and well known in the areas around Uppsala where he hiked in his steel-shod ski boots, suit and overcoat. He was inspired by the philosopher Jean-Jacques Rousseau for whom walking was a necessity of life and not a question of movement. He wrote this hiking song in 1900 when he was 21 years old. Different versions of the origin of the song exist, but according to Ellenius, it was created after a happy evening at the railway hotel in Flen. Thunman was serving as tutor to the sons of bank director Henning Ericsson in Flen, and he had spent a summer evening in 1900 at the hotel restaurant with the oldest son Edwin and station writer Hjalmar Hökberg, which ended with a walk on a road towards Stenhammar Palace. Edwin Ericsson played accordion and Thunman improvised the first lines of Vi gå över daggfriska berg (We go over dew-fresh mountain) which was later changed to daggstänkta (dew-sprinkled).

The origins of the melody are also disputed as some believe that it is a folk song from Hälsingland, while Thunman himself said that he received the melody from his grandmother and thus believed that it was from Gästrikland. Edwin Ericsson, on the other hand, claims that it was he who composed the melody. Herman Sör Carlsson wrote in an article in Upsala Nya Tidning in 1990 that the chorus "fallera" is a later addition and that in the original text the final words are repeated in the verse as: Vi gå över daggstänkta berg, berg, berg.

The text was published in 1906 in the Christmas edition of the magazine Strix, by Abraham Lundquist's publishing house with text and music 1908, and in the collection Den svenska frihetsvisan och andra sånger vid hembygdsmöten (The Swedish freedom song and other songs for homeland associations) published by the Norrland students' educational association in Uppsala (1908), later also by the Woman's Christian Temperance Union in Vita bandets sångbok (1915) and in Nu ska vi sjunga (1943). It was one of the main songs that were compulsory in Swedish school education from 1943 until 1969.

== Lyrics and melody ==
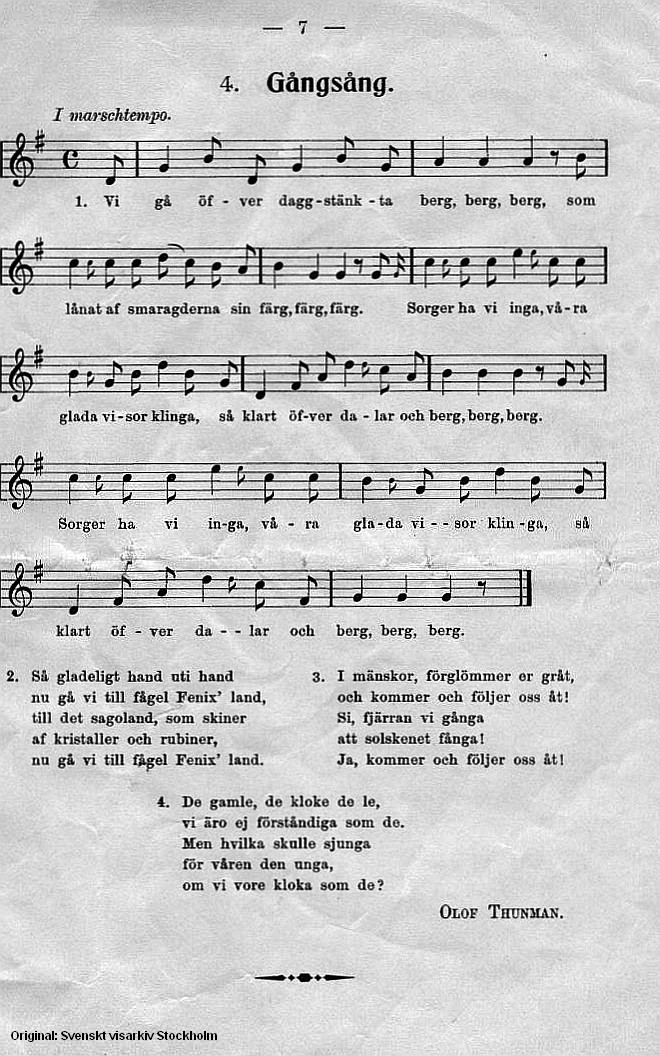
Words and melody, 1908

In the final version of the song, the lyrics are as follows:

Vi gå över daggstänkta berg
som lånat av smaragderna sin färg.
Sorger ha vi inga,
våra glada visor klinga
när vi gå över daggstänkta berg.

I mänskor, förglömmen er gråt,
och kommen och följen oss åt.
Se, fjärran vi gånga
att solskenet fånga
ja kommen och följen oss åt.

De gamla och kloka må le,
vi äro ej förståndiga som de.
Men vem skulle sjunga
om våren den unga,
om vi vore kloka som de?

Så gladeligt hand uti hand,
nu gå vi till fågel Fenix land.
Till ett sagoland som skiner
av kristaller och rubiner,
nu gå vi till fågel Fenix land.

We're strolling on dew-sprinkled hills, fallera,
Whose beauty our hearts with joy instills, fallera,
We're blissful as we're singing,
our merry songs are ringing,
As we're strolling on dew-sprinkled hills, fallera.

O people, forget your all your tears, fallera,
And come with us and join in our cheers, fallera,
Our path so distant reaches,
to blue lakes and sunny beaches,
Ah, come with us and join in our cheers, fallera.

The old and wise they may smile, fallera,
We are as calm just once in a while, fallera,
But who would then be singing,
'bout the brighter days now springing,
'less we are allowed to be juvenile, fallera.

So happily hand in hand, fallera,
We're going to the Phoenix' land, fallera,
The faeryland that shines
of crystals and grapevines
As we're going to the Phoenix' land, fallera.

=== Other languages ===
The melody is also used for a children's poem in Hebrew titled "Our Car Is Big and Green", written by the poet Fania Bergstein in the 1940s. It gained popularity after it was published in her children's book of verse Come to Me, Nice Butterfly.

In German, the song was also used by the Wandervogel movement with the text "Im Frühtau zu Berge". The first text version in German is a translation of unknown author and was published in 1917. In 1924 a new version of the song was published by Walther Hensel. From the middle of the 1920s the song appeared in many German song books, including in a song book for the Hitler Youth.

== Recordings ==
An early recording was made by opera baritone Oscar Bergström in October 1908, published by Skandinaviska Grammophon AB in Stockholm entitled "Gångsång" (Walking song).

The song has also been recorded in English, by Alice Babs and Svend Asmussen on the album Scandinavian Songs of Alice Babs & Svend Asmussen 1964, titled "Through Valleys, Up Mountains".
