= Come to Me, Nice Butterfly =

Israeli children's poetry book

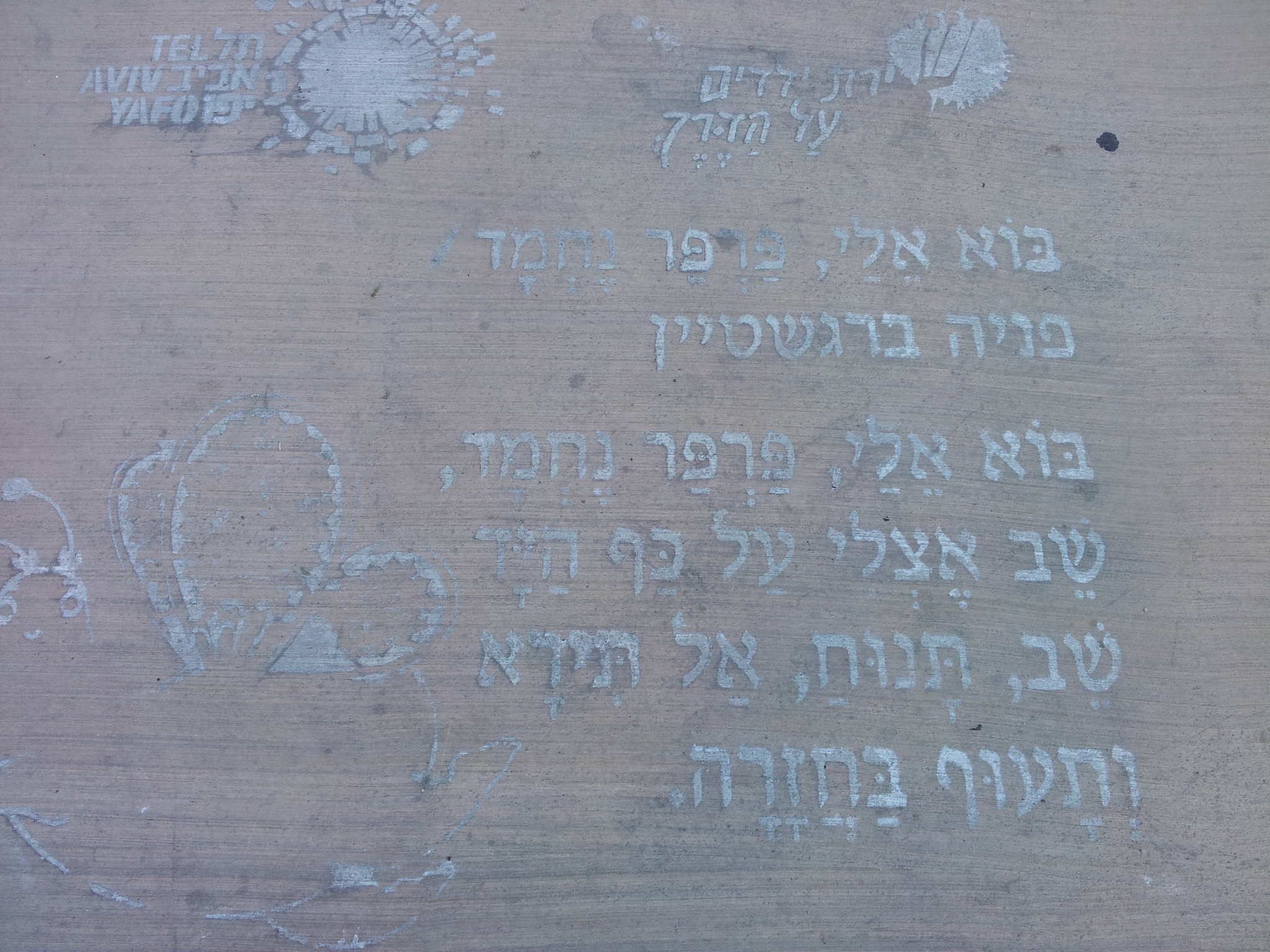
A graffiti of the "Nice Butterfly" verse, Tel Aviv, 2012

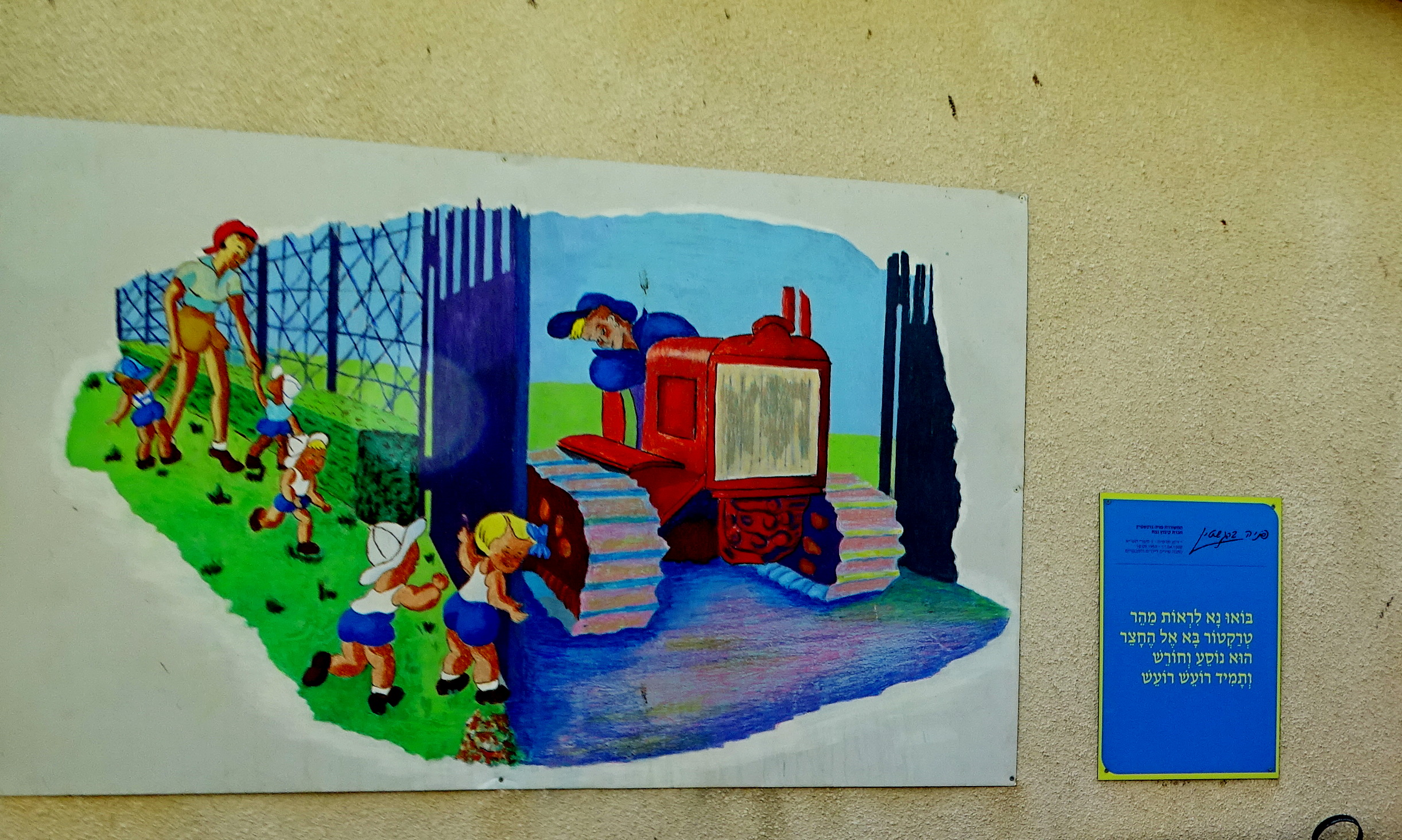
A poster on the Fania Bergstein Trail, Gvat

"Come to Me, Nice Butterfly" (Hebrew: בוא אלי פרפר נחמד, romanized: Bo elai parpar nechmad) is the title of a 1945 children's book of verse and its first poem written by Israeli poet Fania Bergstein. The book was illustrated by Ilse Kantor. Described as a cornerstone of Israeli children's literature, it has been printed in over 40 editions (as of 2020).

== Contents ==
The book contains 8 untitled verses (quatrains) and 8 colorful illustrations. All eight poems are in the voice of a small child who observes the animals, plants, and things around him: a small flower with a butterfly, a hen with her chicks, a lamb, a newborn calf, a car, a tractor, a guard dog. In the last verse the child goes to bed.

=== Signature verse ===
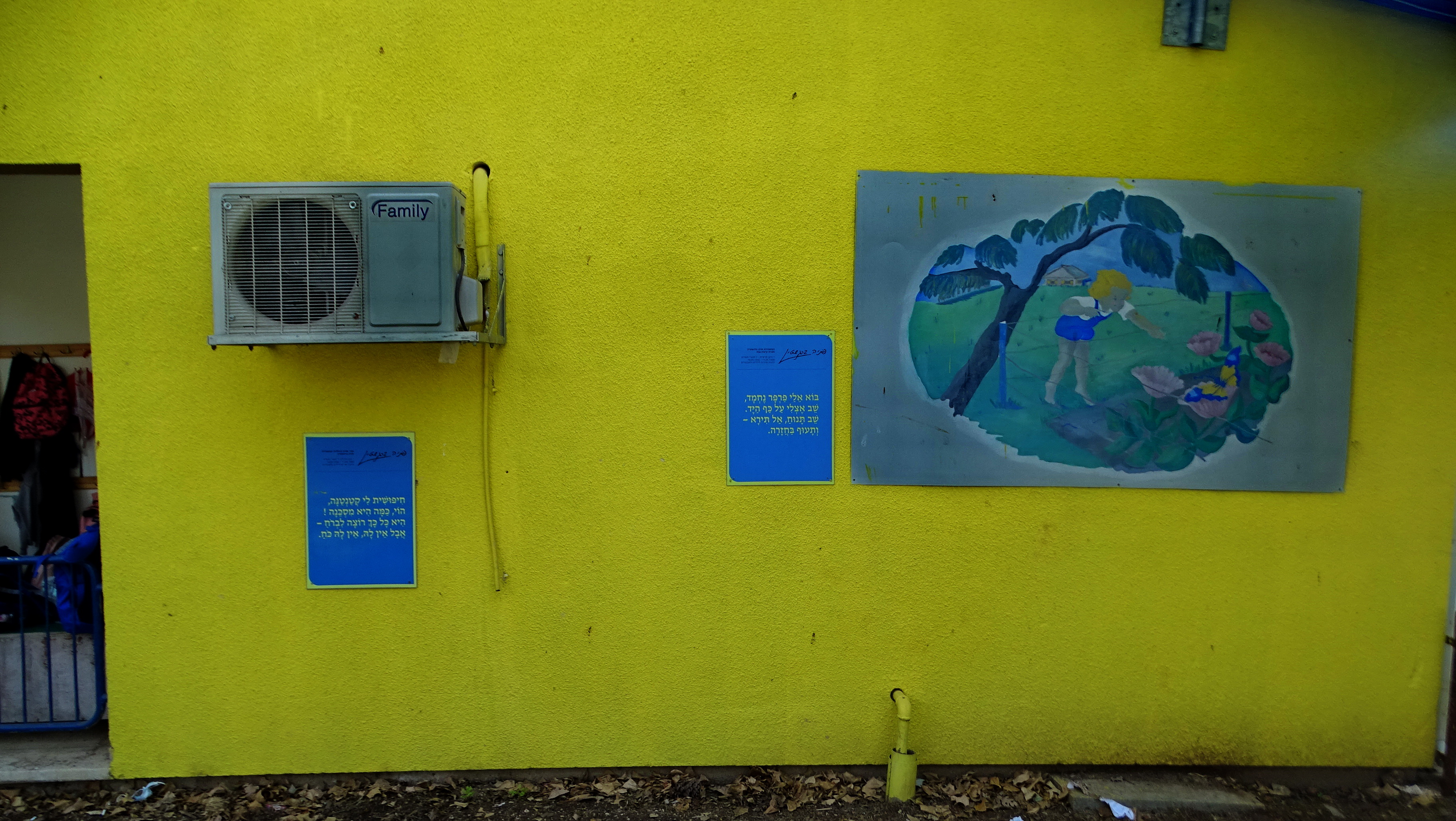
Fania Bergstein Trail: a poster with the cover of the book, which is also the picture for the "Nice Butterfy" inside

| Hebrew text | Transliteration | English translation |
|---|---|---|
| בּוֹא אֵלַי פַּרְפָּר נֶחְמָד, שֵׁב אֶצְלִי עַל כַּף הַיָּד. שֵׁב תָּנוּחַ, אַל תִּירָא – וְתָעוּף בַּחֲזָרָה. | Bo elai parpar nechmad Shev etzli al kaf hayad. Shev tanuach al tira Ve teuf bechazara. | Come to me, nice butterfly, Sit on my palm. Sit, rest, don't be afraid, And fly away again. |

The verse has been turned into a song by various composers and singers.

=== Our Car Is Big and Green ===
| Our car is big and green, Our car travels far. In the morning it goes away, in the evening it returns, It drives to Tnuva with eggs and milk. | הָאוֹטוֹ שֶׁלָּנוּ גָּדוֹל וְיָרֹק, הָאוֹטוֹ שֶׁלָּנוּ נוֹסֵעַ רָחוֹק בַּבֹּקֶר נוֹסֵעַ, בָּעֶרֶב הוּא שָׁב, מוֹבִיל הוּא לִ"תְנוּבָה" בֵּיצִים וְחָלָב. | ha oto shelanu gadol ve yarok ha oto shelanu nose'a rachok ba boker nose'ah, ba erev hu shav me'vil hu le "T'nuva" beitzim vechalav |

The song "Our Car is Big and Green" was written by Bergstein earlier, in 1940, to the tune of a traditional Swedish song "Vi gå över daggstänkta berg" ("We walk over dew-sprinkled mountains") first published in 1906. Later it was found that the tune originated much earlier, likely in 15h-16th centuries as a mercenaries' march. The tune is known in a number of European countries, and its first usage in the land of Israel predates "Our Car".

At that time Bergstein lived in kibbutz Gvat, while Kantor lived in Na'an, which resulted in a minor controversy: the verse "Our Car" is about a truck that carried produce from Gvat to Tnuva. However, the trucks Kantor saw were different from that from Gvat, and when the truck from Gvat was restored, the restorers asked the publishers to make a new picture, based on the actual truck. As of 2009 the publishers were not ready to make a decision about the request.

== History and commentary ==
The book was written upon the order of the Education Committee of the United Kibbutz union, who wanted to provide the kibbutz children with literary works that deal with kibbutz life and reflect the ideas and aspirations of kibbutzniks, i.e., essentially a propaganda of the kibbutz way of life. However, the work of Bergstein and Kantor turned out to be deeper than that, for which the book deserved its fame. Kantor's daughter Theresa stated that Ilse's work was not in any way associated with propaganda or glorification of the life in kibbutz. She simply drew what she saw in her everyday life. She even asked children for their opinions about her pictures and duly took them into a consideration. Art curator Sigal Barkai noted that while there was nothing political in Kantor's pictures, they still reflect the spirit of the time.

The short, catchy rhymes with child-friendly subjects are particularly suitable for small children. By 1994, 500,000 copies of the book were printed, topping the Israeli bestseller list.

== Influence and tribute ==
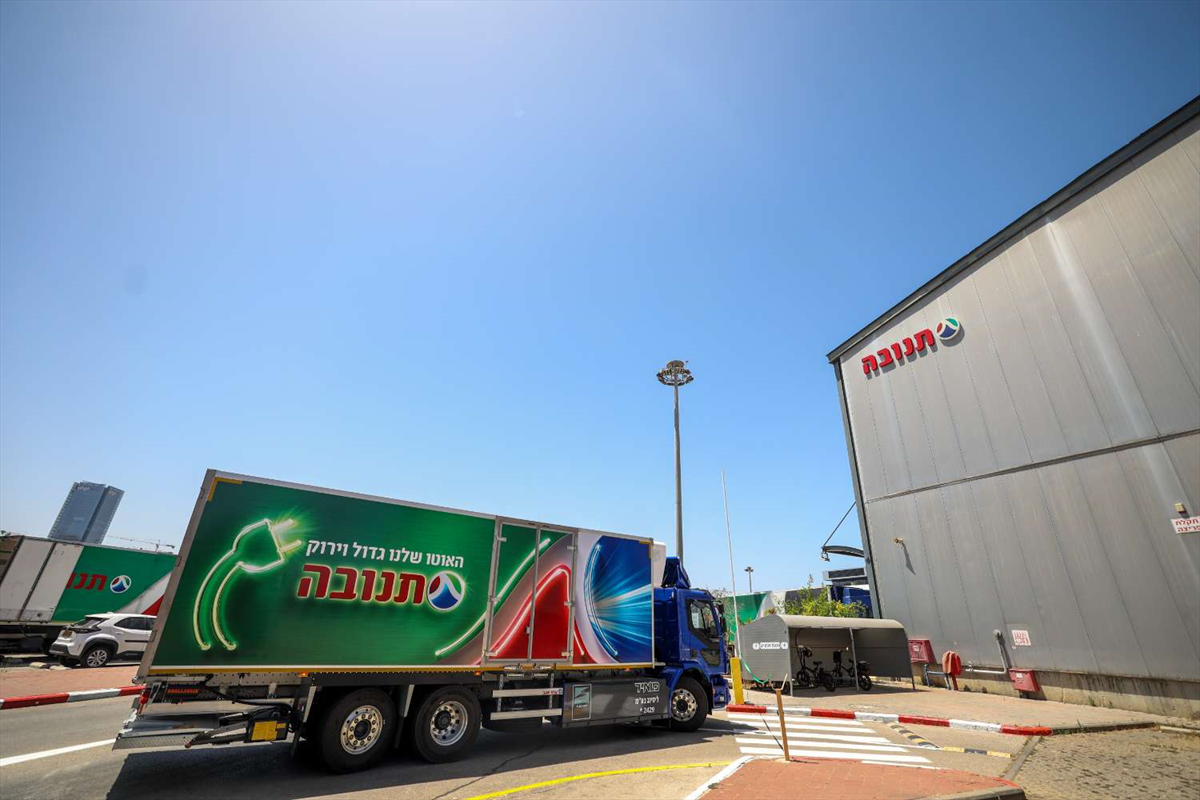
"Our car is big and green" written on Tnuva's first electric truck

A 1960s Israeli pop group The High Windows had a satirical anti-war song written by Hanoch Levin "Bo Hayal shel Shokolad" (Come here, Chocolate Soldier"), which parodied the "Nice Buterfly". Hanoch Levin also wrote a parody to "Our Car" called "Our Child". It ends with the lines: " "He left in the morning and didn't return in the evening / All that's left was father, mother, eggs and milk".

In 2012, an Israeli postage stamp was issued as a tribute to the book in the series "Children's literature".

An Israeli children's show Parpar Nechmad is named after the verse. The theme song of the show, which includes the verse as a refrain, is sung by Ilanit (and released as a single: he:פרפר נחמד (שיר)).

When Tnuva was sold to a Chinese company in 2014, a cartoon appeared in Haaretz, in which the Chinese sing "Our car is big and green".
