= Emil Sjögren =

Swedish organist and composer (1853–1918)

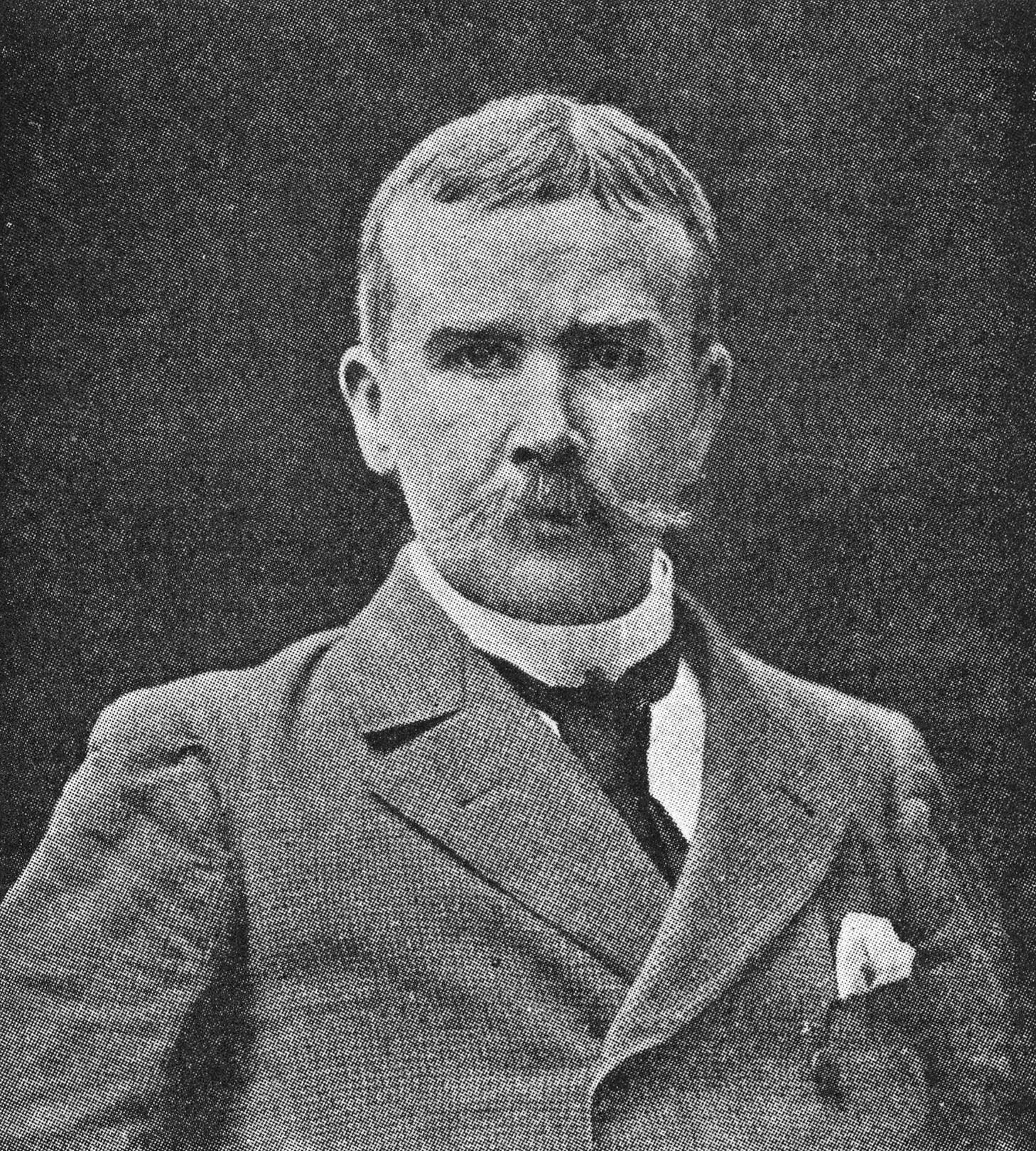
- Sjögren, c. 1900
- Born: Johan Gustav Emil Sjögren; 16 June 1853; Stockholm, Sweden
- Died: 1 March 1918 (aged 64); Knivsta, Uppsala County, Sweden
- Burial place: Norra begravningsplatsen 59°21′13.85″N 18°01′55.08″E
- Education: Royal College of Music, Stockholm
- Occupations: Organist; composer
- Years active: 1890–1918
- Employer: St. John's Church, Stockholm
- Website: emilsjogren.com

Johan Gustav Emil Sjögren (16 June 1853 – 1 March 1918) was a Swedish organist and composer.

Sjögren's two small preludes for organ, Paris, 1904

Born in Stockholm, Sjögren entered the Stockholm Conservatory at the age of seventeen and later continued his studies at the Berlin Conservatory.

From 1890, he served as the organist at the St. John's Church in Stockholm until shortly before his death in Knivsta on 1 March 1918. He was buried at Norra begravningsplatsen, in Solna.

Sjögren is remembered best for his lieder and piano music. Other noteworthy works include three preludes and fugues for organ, five violin sonatas, as well as pieces for choir.
