= Fania Bergstein =

Israeli poet (1908–1950)

- פניה ברגשטיין
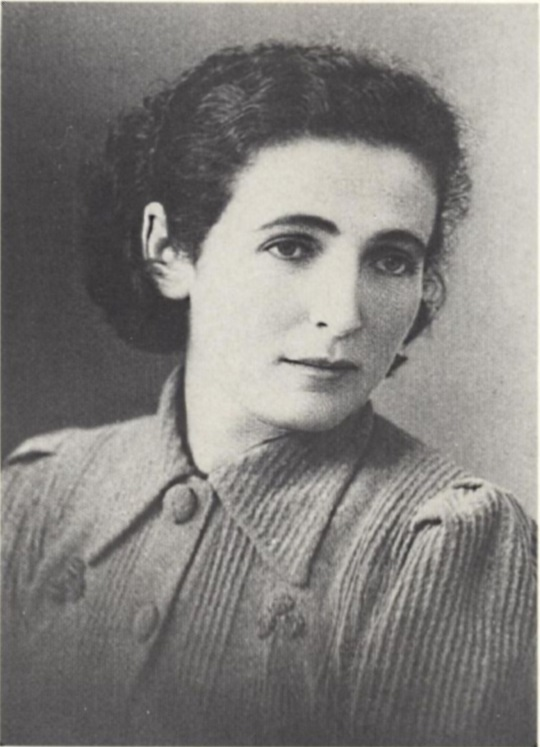
- Born: 11 April 1908; Szczuczyn, Russian Empire
- Died: 18 September 1950 (aged 42); Afula, Israel
- Occupations: Poet; lyricist; author
- Spouse: Aharon Weiner
- Children: 1
- Writing career
- Period: 1932–1950
- Notable work: Come to Me, Nice Butterfly

Fania Bergstein (Hebrew: פניה ברגשטיין; 11 April 1908 – 18 September 1950) was an Israeli poet, lyricist and author who wrote and published for children and adults.

Bergstein made a major contribution to the development of Modern Hebrew poetry for children. A number of her poems for both children and adults have become Israeli classics and are recognized as touchstones of Israel's literary and cultural heritage; many have been set to music. Several of her books, including prose and poetry for children and adults, were published posthumously.

== Biography ==
Fania Bergstein was born in Szczuczyn in Belostoksky Uyezd, Grodno Governorate, Russian Empire (present-day northeastern Poland). Her father, Yehoshua Mordechai Bergstein, was a Hebrew teacher and a central role model in her life; he instilled in her a love for and knowledge of Hebrew from a young age. Historian Muki Tsur relates, "He taught her Hebrew and made her into a Hebrew poet already in Poland and that was something very special."

Her mother, Dvora Bernstein (née Tenenbaum), died when Fania Bergstein was a young woman. Several of her later poems were written about a mother, including "Mommy, Don't be Sad" ("Ima, Al Tihi'i Atzuva"), and nursery rhymes about mother animals and their babies.

During World War I, the family moved to the city of Sumy (present-day Ukraine), where she attended a Russian girls' gymnasium. After the Russian Revolution of 1917, Hebrew language instruction was banned in Russia and so the family moved back to Poland. In her youth, she participated in the Zionist pioneering youth movement Hehalutz HaTzair and later became a key activist in the movement in Poland. In 1930, when she was 22, Bergstein immigrated to Mandatory Palestine as part of the Fifth Aliyah and joined Kibbutz Gvat, which had been founded four years earlier in the Jezreel Valley. She migrated together with her partner, Aharon Weiner Israeli, himself an author, who is also variously identified as her husband and her "lifelong friend". At the age of 19 it was discovered she had a congenital heart defect and she was concerned that she might not be able to perform physical labor as a pioneer, as indeed came to pass.

Upon her arrival on the kibbutz Bernstein packed grapes picked during the harvesting season, about which she later wrote in her first book of poetry, Grape Harvesting (Batzir) published in 1939. However, ill health precluded her from working in agriculture and she had to work as a seamstress in the kibbutz sewing shop and clothing storeroom, which she disliked. She was a youth leader for the Gvat children in the Histadrut's Noar Oved youth labor movement. She also worked as a teacher, edited the kibbutz journal and organized a literary circle. She was chosen to be a kibbutz representative to the Kibbutz Hameuhad Committee and to the Histadrut. Upon her death she left behind her husband Aharon and a son, then 16. Her only child, Gershon Israeli, himself a talented writer and poet, born in 1934, played the mandolin and composed music to some of his mother's verses. Israeli was killed in the Six-Day War in 1967, leaving behind a wife and three young daughters. A year after Fania Bergstein's death a special issue of the Kibbutz Gvat newsletter, devoted to her memory, was printed and distributed to the members. It included letters from children telling how much she had meant to them. A copy of the newsletter is now housed in the National Library of Israel archives.

Bergstein was bedridden for the last five years of her life, during which time she wrote at least one letter a day and sometimes two or three. In letters to her sister, she referred to her room as a prison and herself as a prisoner. She was compelled to spend her last two years in HaEmek Medical Center in Afula, Israel, where she died of heart failure in 1950 at age 42. She left behind a gift of poetry and prose to contemporary and future generations, including manuscripts that were published posthumously. She wrote, "I had a feeling that my days were numbered. And the sky was so blue, and I wanted to live, I wanted so much to live."

== Literary career ==
The first of her poems to be printed was "(Ch)Halomi" ("My Dream"), published in 1926 in the daily Hebrew newspaper haYom (Today) in the city of Warsaw, then the center of Polish Jewry; it appeared under the pen name Bat-haOr (The Daughter of Light).

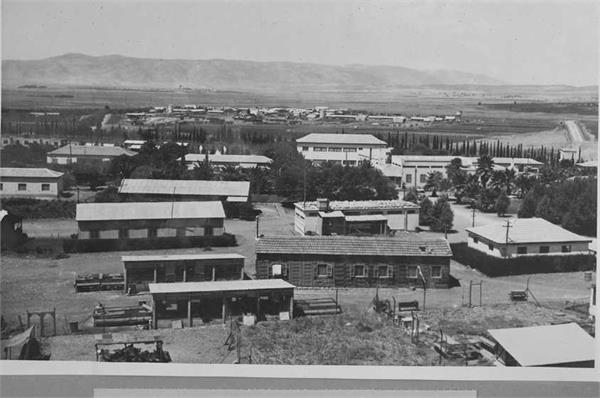
Kibbutz Gvat 1939

Bergstein is sometimes identified as Fania Yisraeli but she used her maiden name for her writing. A translator of a number of her poems noted, "Hers is a quintessentially Israeli story – not only figuratively so. Israeli was her married surname." Her first published poem for children, "Children of Gvat" appeared in Davar newspaper in 1932.She became a key figure on the kibbutz, emerging as a local songwriter. She wrote songs about collective life for kibbutz events and holidays, creating her own songs for each holiday, composing anthems for the classes celebrating the end of the school year and dedicating songs to children.

Bergstein has been linked with two other important women writers: Miriam Yalan-Shteklis and Leah Goldberg. These writers led the way toward formalizing and consolidating children's poetry in Hebrew and diversifying the offerings for children through humorous poetry..."Bergstein has also been compared to Rachel the Poetess in that she composed her creations in the shadow of illness." Both women immigrated to fulfill the Zionist dream, both personal and national. Both wrote of their longing to be fully contributing members of their kibbutzim. Rachel was unmarried and childless, while Bergstein married and gave birth to a son despite her physician's warning. Rachel was expelled from her beloved kibbutz, Degania Aleph, due to being ill with tuberculosis, a contagious and then incurable disease; while Bergstein remained on Gvat, where she suffered from years of poor health. Each woman left behind an oeuvre of poetic work still known, loved and admired decades after her demise.

Bergstein wrote and published 13 books for children: six collections of poetry, six storybooks and one of assorted prose, poetry and plays. In her children's poetry she dealt with simple topics of a child's daily life in nature on a kibbutz; she usually wrote from the point of view of children. "As a member of a kibbutz, she brought to children’s literature the authentic experience of rural life on a farm, describing the direct encounter between children and animals, the farming implements and the smell of the field." It has been noted that in 1945, at the same time that she was writing her first book of nursery rhymes, she was also writing letters and searching desperately for traces of her family members, who she did not know until later had all been exterminated in the Holocaust. The contrast of her simple, lovely rhymes about childhood and nature with the dark abyss of Nazi terror is striking and underlines her noble character.

=== Butterfly ===
Bergstein's classic book of nursery rhymes for small children, Come to Me, Nice Butterfly (Bo Elay, Parpar Nekhmad) is a slim volume containing eight short, untitled poems and eight color illustrations. It was first published in 1945 and is still in print as of 2021. In short verses, the poet depicts the young child's early encounters with nature, the countryside and rural reality. The title of the book is the first line of the first poem in the book. The illustrations are by Ilse Kantor.

Some of the poems' subjects are animals: a butterfly, a lamb, a hen and her chicks, a cow and her calf, a dog. Other subjects are vehicles on the kibbutz, such as a tractor plowing a field and a truck transporting farm produce. The latter one, "Our Truck is Big and Green", is among the best-known poems and songs for young children in the Hebrew language and is based on an actual such truck from the 1940s that made trips to and from Bergstein's kibbutz and its environs.

In 2012, the Israel Postal Company's philatelic service came out with a series of eight stamps depicting and honoring the most treasured classics of Israeli literature for young children, one of those eight was Fania Bergstein's book.

An educational children's television program called Parpar Nechmad, originally based on Bergstein's first book of poems, was developed for Israeli toddlers aged 2–4 and was telecast from 1982 to 2004. It featured puppets, cartoon animation and live actors.

=== Field ===
A second book of nursery rhymes by Bergstein is We'll Go out to the Field (Nisah el haSadeh), containing 32 short poems. It was first published in 1952 with pictures in a muted pallet and some in black and white; it was reprinted continually over the years and in 2003 reappeared with full-color drawings by the original illustrator. The book was illustrated by Michal Efrat of Kibbutz Giv'at Haim. The illustrator was born in Czechoslovakia in 1926, survived Auschwitz and other camps, made aliya in 1949, illustrated children's books and taught art and died in 2000. Here, too, Bergstein's short verses concern a child's daily life, such as nature, seasons and childhood events seen through a child's eyes. In one poem a child's loose tooth falls out and gets lost, in another a sheep gives birth, in a third a bird builds its nest and in a fourth a child falls and scrapes his/her knee. Some of the poems in this book were also set to music, including the poem bearing the same first line as the book's title, for which the tune was composed by Yaakov Sagi.

=== Evening ===
Another of Bergstein's classic books for children is And it was Evening (VaYehi Erev). This link contains the complete Hebrew text, first published in 1949. It is a full-length picture book with a story composed in rhyme. It is based upon the second of 32 evenings whose events are related in the obscure story What the Moon Saw by Danish author Hans Christian Andersen, written in 1840. Bergstein, who credited Andersen with the story on her cover, expanded it considerably. In her storybook a well-meaning little girl is chastized by her father for causing an uproar in a henhouse, but is afterwards comforted by him when he realizes her intentions were admirable. The 19th-century milieu transferred easily to a kibbutz setting. This book, too, was illustrated by Ilse Kantor but her drawings were not used and those of a different artist, Haim Hausmann, were published instead. In 2010 the book was reprinted with Kantor's original illustrations after having been shelved over 60 years earlier. Both versions of the book are still available as of 2021.

=== Other children's books ===
Besides the three abovementioned books for children by Bergstein, her others were five storybooks: Danny's Golden Ducks (Barvazei haZahav shel Dani, 1945), The Cuckoo (haKukiya, 1947), Racheli, Amos and Ilana (Rakheli, Amos veIlana, 1948), Red Rhymes (Kharuzim Adumim, 1956), Benny and Gita (Beni veGita, 1960) and four more books of poetry: I Knew a Song (Shir Yad'ati, 1954) Between Songs and Gardens (Bein Shirim veGanim, 1956), Blue and Red (Tkhelet veAdom, illustrated by Shmuel Katz, 1967) and I Planted a Seed (Gar'in Tamanti, 1968). Her twelfth children's book was a collection of poems, plays and stories, Happy Eyes (Einayim Smeikhot, illustrated by Tzila Binder, 1961). A number of her children's books were published posthumously. In an indication of Bergstein's continuing popularity, in 2013 a new book by her was published, Rachel's Wondrous Shoes (Na'alei haPeleh shel Rakhel), the contents of which had previously been one of the three stories in her storybook from 1948 and also one of the stories in her story collection of 1956. The publisher of all of Bergstein's books except for her first one was Hakibbutz Hameuchad Publishing House.

=== Other children's publications ===
She also wrote poems that were published in various publications, such as the weekly children's magazine Mishmar liYeladim which was a supplement of Al haMishmar, owned by and associated with haShomer haTzair Zionist-Socialist youth movement. One such poem was featured on the front cover of the July 1, 1948 issue, in the midst of the Israeli War of Independence (also known as the 1947–1949 Palestine war). A copy of the issue is now housed in the National Library of Israel. Bergstein's poem, accompanied by a simple illustration, is entitled "Our Shelter". Narrated from a child's point of view, it describes the air-raid shelter as a safe, pleasant place, from which sounds of a cricket and a plow can be heard. The child, ensconced in the shelter, imagines pastoral sights outside, from the lowly grass roots to the lofty treetops, and feels no fear. Mishmar liYeladim also featured prose and poetry for children by other literary luminaries of the time, such as Lea Goldberg and Avraham Shlonsky.

== Adult literature ==
Israeli historian Muki Tsur, in his biographical book in Hebrew, Fania Bergstein[:] Poetess and Pioneer, tells the story of Bergstein's life and analyses her works written for adults. He notes that her reputation as a children's poet has largely eclipsed her achievement as a writer of prose and poetry for adults; he emphasizes her importance as a voice of her generation. In particular she wrote, for her adult audience, of the grief and longing of the pioneers in the Land of Israel who had left their families behind in Eastern Europe only to later learn of their brutal annihilation during the Holocaust. Her poetry expresses the deep sense of orphanhood that characterized her generation. Fania Bergstein, in the words of Israeli journalist, columnist and translator Sarah Honig, is "important to understanding our Israeli identity, why we are here, what moves and motivates us… Like most everyone around her, Fania was a bridge. She was a living connection between a destroyed world and the new one being created. She articulated both the heartache and the hope." Bergstein's published writing for adults consists of four books, three of poetry and one of prose, including several published posthumously. The collections of poetry are: Grape Harvesting (Batzir, 1939), Passing Clouds (Avim Kholfot, 1950) and Harvest (Assif, 1955); the book of prose is Writings (Reshimot, 1952).

=== Melodies ===
Bergstein's most familiar and significant poem for adults is entitled Melodies (Nigunim), also known as You have Planted Melodies (Shataltim Nigunim) which is the first line of the poem. Its delicate lyrics are sophisticated in their understatement. The poem was written in 1944, was set to music by David Zehavi, and has been sung by various artists on different occasions, such as this performance by Meshi Kleinstein. Other singers have been: haMa'apil Trio, Gevatron, Nekhama Hendel and Yehudit Ravitz. In it the poet, speaking for her generation of children of Holocaust victims, expresses love and appreciation for her parents and remorse over their sacrifice. She writes of the deep connections between herself and her parents, as one is intertwined in the other. When she penned the words she did not yet know the fate of her family members, whom she had left behind in Poland. Much has been written about this haunting poem, which is sung on Holocaust Day and other solemn occasions in Israel.

"The poet expresses the longing and pain of Zionist pioneers who left their lives and families behind to move to Israel. This poem reflects many of the emotions of an entire generation that managed to act on their dreams but needed to pay a price in the process."

"Perhaps she wrote the song with the understanding that her voice resonating in her mind would no longer be heard in reality. Perhaps she wrote the song of love and longing, because she already felt that only such an expression would connect her and them."

Melodies – 1944

You planted melodies in me, my mother and my father,

Melodies, forgotten hymns.

Seeds, seeds my heart carried –

Now they rise and grow.

Now they sprout offshoots in my blood,

Their roots intertwine in my arteries,

Your melodies my father, your songs my mother,

Awaken and reverberate in my pulse.

Here I listen to my distant lullaby,

Chanted from mother to daughter.

Here will sparkle in tears and laughter

"Lamentations" and Sabbath tunes.

Each sound is hushed and each note is stilled.

It’s within me in that your faraway voices teem.

My eyes I’ll close and I am with you

Above the darkness of the abyss.

Fania Bergstein was a pioneer with the soul of a poet. She wrote, "There are peculiar people in the world, people who occupy themselves by collecting valuable things. One of them might collect ancient stones, another might collect stamps. There are those who collect rare manuscripts. And I, too, am a collector; I collect sparks of light."
