= Al-Mujaydil =

al-Mujaydil المْجيدل
- Etymology: The little watch-tower
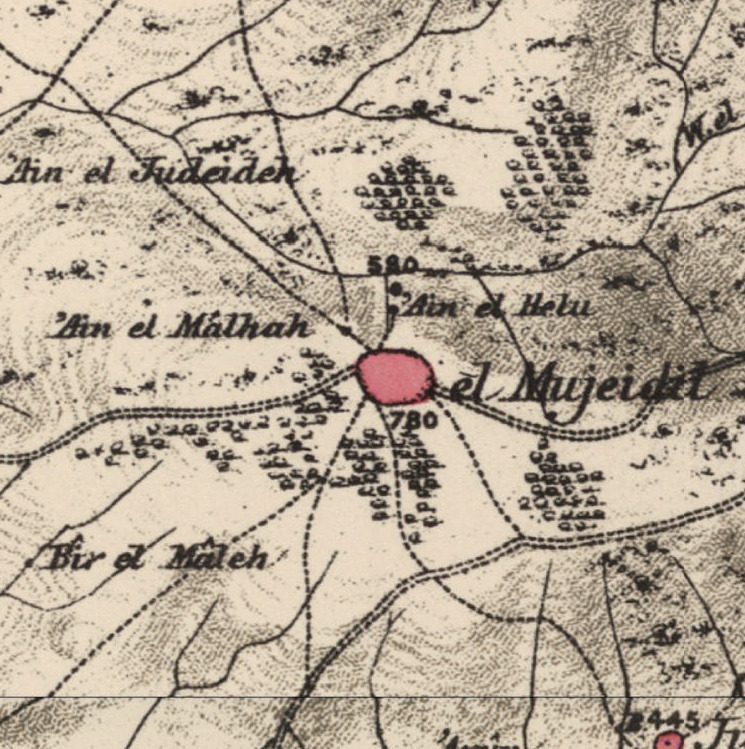
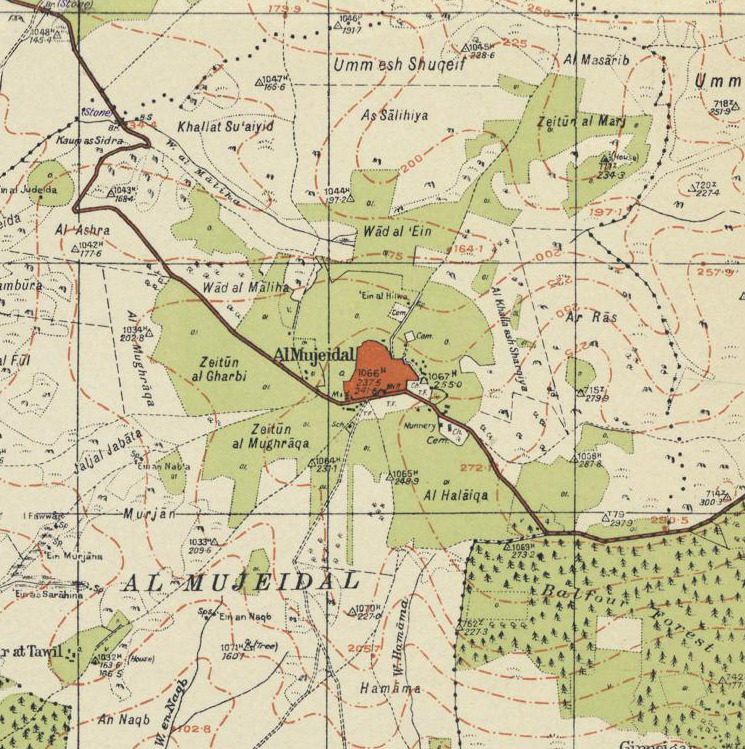
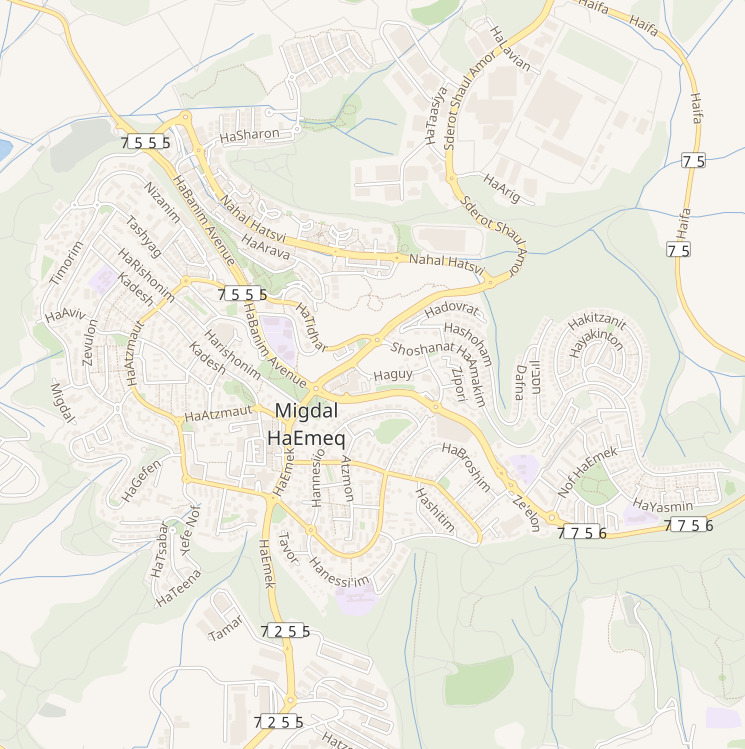
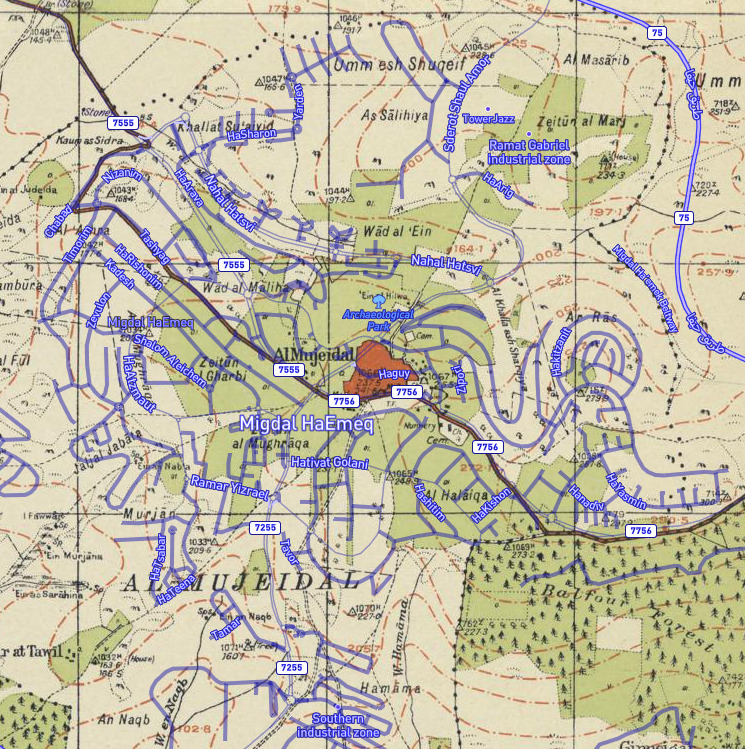
- 1870s map 1940s map modern map 1940s with modern overlay map A series of historical maps of the area around Al-Mujaydil (click the buttons)

- Location within Mandatory Palestine
- Coordinates: 32°40′42″N 35°14′39″E
- Palestine grid: 173/231
- Geopolitical entity: Mandatory Palestine
- Subdistrict: Nazareth
- Date of depopulation: 15 July 1948

Area
  - Total: 18,836 dunams (18.836 km^{2}; 7.273 sq mi)

Population (1945)
  - Total: 1,900
- Cause(s) of depopulation: Military assault by Yishuv forces
- Current Localities: Migdal HaEmek, Yifat

Al-Mujaydil (Arabic: المْجيدل (also: al-Mujeidil) was an Arab-Palestinian village located 6 km southwest of Nazareth. Al-Mujaydil was one of a few towns that achieved local council status by the Mandatory Palestine government. In 1945, the village had a population of 1,900 and total land area of 18,836 dunams – mostly Arab-owned. The population was partly Christian and the town contained a Roman Catholic church and monastery.

After the 1948 depopulation of Palestine, it was destroyed and overbuilt by Migdal HaEmek.

== History ==
Traces of a Roman road was found close to the village, which may indicate that the region was opened to intensive settlements as early as Roman times.

=== Ottoman era ===
In the 1596 tax records, al-Mujaydil was part of the Ottoman Empire, nahiya (subdistrict) of Tiberias under the Safed Sanjak, with a population of 4 Muslim families. The villagers paid a fixed tax rate of 25% on various agricultural products, including wheat and barley, fruit trees, as well as on goats and beehives; a total of 3,295 akçe. Half of the revenue went to a waqf. In 1799 it was named Magidel in the map of Pierre Jacotin.

C.R. Conder, of the PEF's Survey of Western Palestine, camped by the place in the 1870s, and described the village as a place being visited by missionaries. The village was also described as being "flourishing", and built of stone and mud. It was on the northern side of a small plateau, and olive groves were cultivated to the south and to the east. The population size was estimated at 800 (in 1859), and they cultivated 100 faddans.

In 1882, Grand Duke Sergei Alexandrovich of Russia, the brother of the Russian Tsar, visited the village, and donated money for the construction of a Russian Orthodox Church there in the hope that local Christians would be converted to the Orthodox faith. However, the Patriarch of Jerusalem Nikodim opened the church to all denominations in the village and ensured it functioned most of the time as a village school. A population list from about 1887 showed that al-Mujaydil had about 1,000 inhabitants; "for the greater part Muslims".

In 1903, a Roman Catholic church was built in the village. It housed on its first floor a trilingual school for boys and girls, (teaching was in Arabic, Italian and French). It also housed a local clinic for the benefit of the villagers.

=== British Mandate period ===
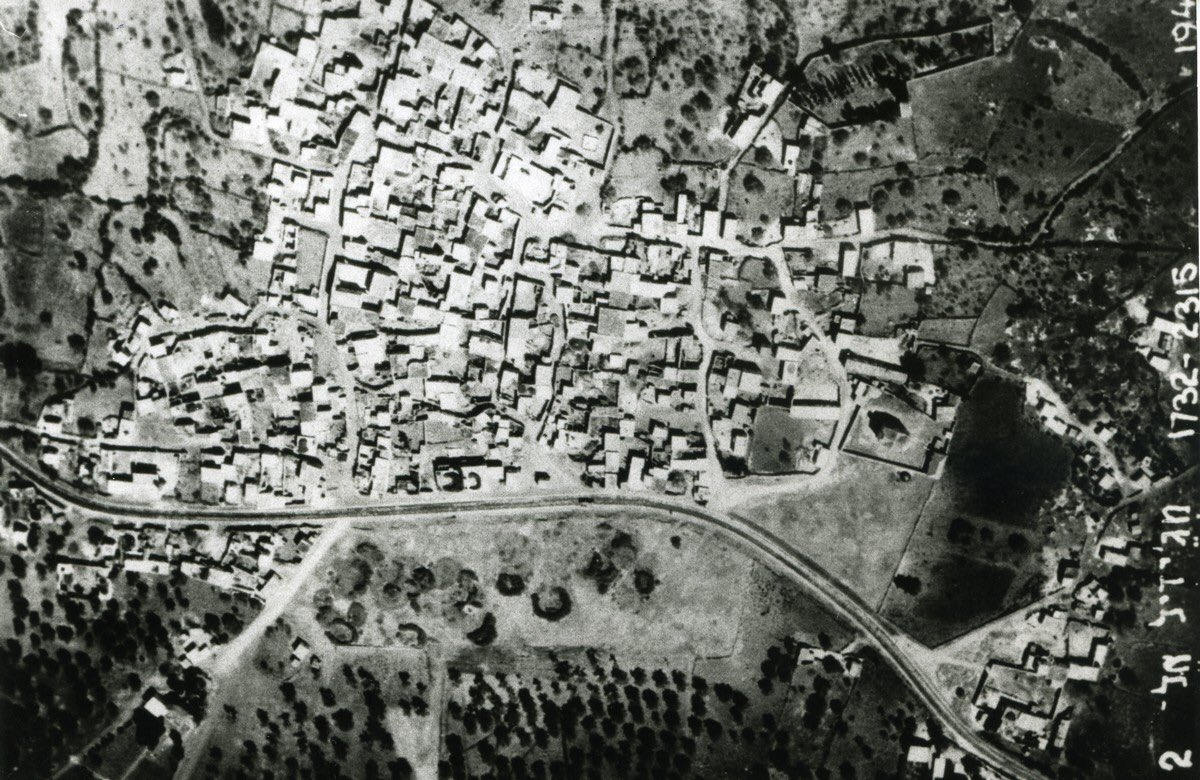
Al-Mujaydil 1947 from Palmach archive

According to the British Mandate's 1922 census of Palestine, al-Mujaydil had 1,009 inhabitants; 817 Muslims and 192 Christians, where 150 of the Christians were Orthodox, 33 Roman Catholics, 2 were Melkite and 7 were Anglicans.

In 1930, the al-Huda mosque was built in the village; it was 12 meters high and 8 meters wide. A kuttab (traditional preparatory school) was nearby. The mosque was well known for the elaborate system it used to collect rainfall from its roof into a well. A tall minaret was added in the 1940s. By the 1931 census the population had increased to 1,241; 1,044 Muslims and 197 Christians, in a total of 293 houses.

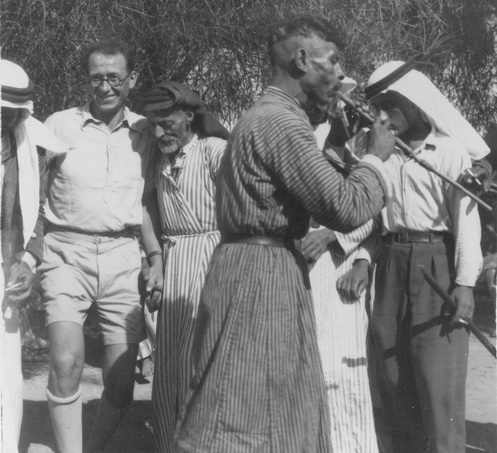
Wedding in al-Mujaydil, 1945

In the 1945 statistics the population of Mujeidil was 1,900; 1,640 Muslims and 260 Christians, with a total of 18,836 dunams of land, according to an official land and population survey. Of this, 1,719 dunams of land were for plantations and irrigable land, 15,474 for cereals, while 34 dunams were built-up land.

=== 1948 and aftermath ===
Al-Mujaydil was occupied and captured by the Haganah's Golani Brigade during second half of Operation Dekel on 15 July 1948. The attack included a bombing raid by Israeli planes. Most of the population fled to the nearby city of Nazareth, where they live as internal refugees.

In August 1948, a Jezreel Battalion Golani patrol encountered "groups of Arab women working fields" near Al-Mujaydil, and they reported that: "I [squad OC Shalom Lipman] ordered the machine-gun to fire three bursts over their heads, to drive them off. They fled in the direction of the olive grove...". But after the patrol left, the villagers returned. The patrol came back and encountered "a group of Arab men and women... I opened fire and killed a Palestinian man and one man and one woman were injured. In the two incidents, I expended 31 bullets." The following day, 6 August, the same patrol encountered two Arab funeral processions. The commander remarked dryly that "one can only assume that one of yesterday ´s wounded died." A day or two after, the patrol again encountered "a large group of Arab women in the fields of Mujeidil. When we approached them to drive them off, an Arab male [was found] hiding near them, [and] he was executed by us. The women were warned not to return to this area of Mujeidil." The company commander's commented: "Arab women repeatedly attempt to return to Mujeidil, and they are usually accompanied by men. I gave firm orders to stymie every attempt [lehasel kol nisayon] to return to the village of Mujeidil."

However, in 1950, after intervention from the Pope Pius XII, the Palestinian Christians of the village were offered the opportunity to move back to the village, but refused to do so without their Muslim neighbours. Israel then destroyed half of the houses and one of the village mosques.

The Israeli town of Migdal HaEmek was founded by Iranian Jews in 1952 on the Palestinian destroyed village land, less than 1 km southwest of the village site. Yifat, established in 1926 on what were traditionally village land, is 2 km to the west of the site of al-Mujaydil.

The Palestinian historian Walid Khalidi, described the remains of the village in 1992: "Most of the site is covered with a pine forest that serves as an Israeli park. The monastery and parts of the (destroyed) church are the only remaining buildings on the site; monks still live in the monastery. Remnants of destroyed houses and the walls of a cemetery are visible. Cactuses and pomegranate, olive, and fig trees grow around the site, which is dotted with wells."

== Notable descendants ==
Diana Buttu.

== Bibliography ==
- Barron, J.B., ed. (1923). Palestine: Report and General Abstracts of the Census of 1922. Government of Palestine.
- Conder, C.R.; Kitchener, H.H. (1881). The Survey of Western Palestine: Memoirs of the Topography, Orography, Hydrography, and Archaeology. Vol. 1. London: Committee of the Palestine Exploration Fund.
- Conder, C.R. (1878). Tent work in Palestine. A record of discovery and adventure. Vol. 1. Internet.archive (from University of Toronto collection).
- Department of Statistics (1945). Village Statistics, April, 1945. Government of Palestine.
- Hadawi, S. (1970). Village Statistics of 1945: A Classification of Land and Area ownership in Palestine. Palestine Liberation Organization Research Center. Archived from the original on 2018-12-08.
- Hütteroth, W.-D.; Abdulfattah, K. (1977). Historical Geography of Palestine, Transjordan and Southern Syria in the Late 16th Century. Erlanger Geographische Arbeiten, Sonderband 5. Erlangen, Germany: Vorstand der Fränkischen Geographischen Gesellschaft. ISBN 3-920405-41-2.
- Karmon, Y. (1960). "An Analysis of Jacotin's Map of Palestine" (PDF). Israel Exploration Journal. 10 (3, 4): 155–173, 244–253. Archived from the original (PDF) on 2017-12-01.
- Khalidi, W. (1992). All That Remains: The Palestinian Villages Occupied and Depopulated by Israel in 1948. Washington D.C.: Institute for Palestine Studies. ISBN 0-88728-224-5.
- Mills, E., ed. (1932). Census of Palestine 1931. Population of Villages, Towns and Administrative Areas. Jerusalem: Government of Palestine.
- Morris, B. (2004). The Birth of the Palestinian Refugee Problem Revisited. Cambridge University Press. ISBN 978-0-521-00967-6.
- Palmer, E.H. (1881). The Survey of Western Palestine: Arabic and English Name Lists Collected During the Survey by Lieutenants Conder and Kitchener, R. E. Transliterated and Explained by E.H. Palmer. Committee of the Palestine Exploration Fund.
- Pappé, I. (2006). The Ethnic Cleansing of Palestine. London and New York: Oneworld. ISBN 1-85168-467-0.
- Rhode, H. (1979). Administration and Population of the Sancak of Safed in the Sixteenth Century (PhD). Columbia University. Archived from the original on 2020-03-01.
- Schumacher, G. (1888). "Population list of the Liwa of Akka". Quarterly Statement – Palestine Exploration Fund. 20: 169–191.
