= Sarah Honig =

Sarah Honig (Hebrew: שרה הוניג) is an Israeli journalist and opinion columnist.

== Early life ==
Honig was born in Israel and reared in both Israel and the United States. She was educated at the High School of Music and Art in New York City and at Tel Aviv University.

== Career ==
Honig began work as a reporter for the Jerusalem Post in 1968, while still a university student.

In the 1960s, 70s and 80s, Honig was the leading reporter covering the Movement to Free Soviet Jewry and the Refuseniks.

In the early 1980s she became the Post's senior political correspondent. She had a column on Israeli politics, Insider Dealings. From 1991–2001 she was the Post's political analyst. Since 1999 she has had a column, Another Tack, covering Israel and world affairs. Since 2003 she has also been a senior editorial writer.

== Publications ==
- Debunking the Bull: For Seekers of Another Tack (Gefen, 2013)

== Personal life ==
Honig is a mother, and an artist. She collects antique and vintage dolls.
