= Kokhav Nolad 6 =

Israeli reality TV show season

- Season 6
- Starring: Tzvika Hadar; Margalit Tzan'ani; Tsedi Tzarfati; Svika Pik; Gal Uchovsky; Daphna Lustig

Release
- Original network: Keshet
- Original release: May 25 – August 26, 2008

Season chronology
- ← Previous; Kokhav Nolad 5 Next → Kokhav Nolad 7

Kokhav Nolad 6 was the 6th season of the popular reality TV show Kokhav Nolad, which focused on finding the next Israeli pop star. It was hosted by Tzvika Hadar with judges Gal Uchovsky, Margalit Tzan'ani, Svika Pik, and Tsedi Tzarfati.

== Participants ==
=== Male participants ===
- Israel Bar-On (born January 31, 1989) from Beersheba.
- Lee Biran also nicknamed Libi (born December 16, 1989) from Kfar Saba.
- Aviv Meshulam (born August 15, 1990) from Neta'im. Was (eliminated), got (save) but was (eliminated)
- Rotem Katz (born May 21, 1990) from Akko. (eliminated)
- Matan Kauffman (born 1990) from Kfar Saba. (eliminated)
- Ben Tzuk (born September 14, 1980) from Amuka. (eliminated)
- Oz Tzechovoy (born April 14, 1988) from Zikhron Ya'akov. (eliminated)
- Sagi Trabelsi (born August 5, 1989) from Rishon LeZion. (eliminated)
- Alex Krul (born September 26, 1989) from Kiryat Motzkin. (eliminated)

=== Female participants ===
- Carmel Eckman (born March 3, 1988) from Bar'am.
- Ma'ayan Hajbi (born August 2, 1991) from Yakhini. (eliminated)
- Adi Avishay (born November 21, 1985) from Kfar Saba. (eliminated)
- Birgitta Växler (born September 20, 1990) from Mevaseret Zion. (eliminated)
- Sisters G (Orly Guetta & Shuli Guy) (born July 15, 1986 and August 22, 1986) from Netanya. Was (eliminated), got (save) but was (eliminated)
- Bat-Hen Hakyia (born May 4, 1984) from Tel Mond. (eliminated)
- Tair Gamliel (born July 14, 1978) from Rehovot. (eliminated)
- Daniel Kri'ef (born February 12, 1991) from Shtulim. (eliminated)
- Michale Jakubowicz (born January 16, 1985) from Kfar Saba. (eliminated)
- Moran Shmueli (born January 17, 1986) from Ein Vered. (eliminated)

== First Solo Show - June 30 ==
The first show was held on June 30, again, held in Herzliyya. These were the participants of the first show, and their entries, and also the original performer of the song.

Participant	Song	Original Performer	Info
Bat-Hen Hakyia	"Tavo Achshav" (Come Now)	Offira Yossefi	
Moran Shmueli	"Al Teshate BaAhava" (Don't fool love)	Yehoram Gaon	Eliminated.
Maayan Hajbi	"Ein Li Davar" (I've got nothing)	Liat Yitzchaky	
Matan Kauffman	"Na'ara BeMishkafayim" (A girl with glasses)	Gidi Gov	
Aviv Meshulam	"Akhrei Hakol At Shir" (After all you're a song)	Shlomo Artzi	Awarded as the best solo of this show by the judges.
Michale Jakubowicz	"Shalom LaTmimut" (Goodbye to the innocence)	Ronit Shachar	
Rotem Katz	"Akshav Tov" (It's good now)	Gilad Segev	
Daniel Kri'ef	"Kulam Medabrim Al Shalom" (Everybody's talking about peace)	Muki	Bottom 2.
Israel Bar-On	"Melakh HaDma'ot" (The tears' salt)	Aviv Geffen	

During the show, the 19 participants sang also "Akshav Hakol Beseder", originally by Yehudit Ravitz. The first participant to leave the show was Moran Shmueli, who almost participated in Kokhav Nolad 5.

== Second Solo Show - July 1 ==
Participant	Song	Original Performer	Info
Birgitta Växler	"Yesh Li Zipor Ktana Balev" (I have a little bird in my heart)	Yigal Bashan	Rumored to be the second place in the public's vote.
Ben Tzuk	"Hakheder HaIntimi Sheli" (My intimate room)	Ta'arovet Eskot	Rumored to be the fifth place in the public's vote.
Sisters G	"Aba" (Dad)	Shlomi Shabat	Rumored to be the fourth place in the public's vote.
Libi (Lee) Biran	"Eikh Ze SheKochav..." (How can a star...)	Matti Caspi	Awarded as the best solo of this show by the judges, rumored to be the first place in the public's vote.
Carmel Eckman	"Kesem HaLayla" (The night's magic)	Milk and Honey	Rumored to be the sixth place in the public's vote.
Alex Krul	"Modedet" (Measuring)	Yermi Kaplan	Eliminated.
Adi Avishay	"Yalda Ktana" (Little girl)	The High Windows	Rumored to be the third place in the public's vote.
Tair Gamliel	"Lolita"	Etti Ankri	Rumored to be the eighth place in the public's vote.
Sagi Trabelsi	"Hazman Shelakh" (Your time)	HaYehudim	Rumored to be the seventh place in the public's vote.
Oz Tzechovoy	"Uri Ur" (Wake up)	Aviv Geffen	Rumored to be the ninth place in the public's vote.

== Third Solo Show - July 6 ==
Participant	Song	Original Performer	Info
Carmel Eckman	"Yatsanu Lirkod" (We went to Dance)	HaDorbanim	???
Daniel Kri'ef	"Inyan shel zman" (A matter of time)	Gidi Gov	Bottom 2.
Birgitta Växler	"KsheHalev Bokhe" (When the heart cries)	Sarit Hadad	???
Matan Kauffman	"Ani Ro'e Ota BaDerekh LaGimnasia" (I see her on the road to the Gymnasium)	Arik Einstein	???
Sisters G	"Ani Shuv BaTmuna" (I'm in the picture again)	Yardena Arazi	???
Adi Avishay	"Tagidi SheTov" (Say it's Good)	Knesiyat Hasekhel	Awarded as the best solo of this show by the judges.
Oz Tzechovoy	"Shtey Etsba'ot MiTzidon" (Two fingers from Sidon)	Boaz Offri	???
Bat-Hen Hakyia	"Balada LaNa'ivit" (A ballad to the Naïve)	Yael Levy	Bottom 2.
Aviv Meshulam	"Sham Me'ever LaKeshet" (Somewhere over the Rainbow)	Julie Andrews	???

Bat-Hen and Daniel were the bottom two performers. They had to wait for the second day, where they would meet that day's bottom two and wait for the judges' results to decide the qualifier(s) for the next stage.

== Fourth Solo Show - July 7 ==
Participant	Song	Original Performer	Info
Ma'ayan Hajbi	"Shecharchoret" (Black Girl)	Esther Ofarim	Awarded as the best solo of this show by the judges.
Tair Gamliel	"Kol Kakh Mukar" (So familiar)	Margalit Tzan'ani	???
Israel Bar-On	"Hal'ah" (Further On)	Rivka Zohar	???
Ben Tzuk	"Al Kol Ele" (For Everything)	Naomi Shemer	???
Rotem Katz	"Yom M'eunan" (Cloudy Day)	Hi-5	???
Sagi Trabelsi	"Im at adayin ohevet oti" (If you still love me)	Boaz Sharabi	Bottom 2.
Michale Jakubowicz	"Yaldonet" (Little Girl)	Shlomo Artzi	Bottom 2.
Lee Biran	"Hi tikach otcha" (She'll take you)	Dafna Armoni	???

The bottom two were Sagi Trabelsi and Michale Jakubowicz. The judges could save up to two participants, but three judges voted for Bat-Hen, and only one judge voted for Michale. Therefore, Michale, Sagi and Daniel were eliminated.

== First Duet Show - July 13 ==
Participant	Song	Original Performer	Info
Tair Gamliel & Bat-Hen Hakyia	"Berosh Ekhad" (One mind)	Dani Litani and Yehudit Ravitz	
Carmel Eckman & Rotem Katz	Eden	Irving Berlin	
Sisters G & Ben Tzuk	Yachad (Together)	Milk and Honey	Bottom 2.
Israel Bar-On & Birgitta Växler	Shvaesre (Seventeen)	Shlomo Artzi	
Matan Kauffman & Lee Biran	Siman she'ate tzair (That means you're young)	Gidi Gov	
Ma'ayan Hajbi & Oz Tzechovoy	Hatmunot sheba'albom (The pictures in the album)	Haim Moshe	Bottom 2.
Adi Avishay & Aviv Meshulam	Samba bishnayim (Samba for two)	Matti Caspi and Yehudit Ravitz	

The bottom two pairs were Ma'ayan Hajbi and Oz Tzechovoy and Sisters G and Ben Tzuk. Each had the chance to sing solos and voting was opened again. In the end, Sisters G was eliminated.

Participant	Song	Original Performer	Info
Oz Tzechovoy	Yesh li sikuy (I have a chance)	Eviatar Banai	
Ma'ayan Hajbi	Birkat elohim (God's blessing)	Hofit	
Ben Tzuk	Yesh bekha (There's something in you)	HaChaverim shel Natasha	
Sisters G	KsheZe noge'a (When it touches)	Etti Ankri	Eliminated.

== Fifth Solo Show - July 14 ==
This show had a theme of children's songs.

Participant	Song	Original Performer	Info
Lee Biran	Tulik	Oshik Levy	Awarded as the best performance by the judges.
Oz Tzechovoy	Ani tamid nishar ani (I'm always stays myself)	Uzi Hitman	
Israel Bar-On	Rivim ktanim (Little fights)	HaKeves HaShisha'asar	
Carmel Eckman	Ma osot ha'ayalot (What do the does do)	Arik Einstein	
Matan Kauffman	Yossi	Chava Alberstein	
Rotem Katz	HaYeled hakhi katan bakita (The littlest kid in the class)	Uzi Hitman	
Birgitta Växler	Yeled pele (Wonder child)	Yigal Bashan	
Tair Gamliel	Mak'hela aliza (Happy choir)	Chava Alberstein	
Ma'ayan Hajbi	Mi ohev et haShabat (Who loves Sabbath)	Various artists	
Ben Tzuk	Brakim ve'reamim (Lightnings and thunders)	HaKeves HaShisha'asar	
Bat-Hen Hakyia	Tnu ligdol besheket (Let us grow silently)	Gidi Gov	
Aviv Meshulam	Nitpayesa (We'll reconcile)	Shmulik Karuss & Josie Katz	Eliminated.
Adi Avishay	Tni li leakhlit (Let me decide)	Josie Katz	

== Second Duet Show - July 20 ==
Participant	Song	Original Performer	Info
Bat-Hen Hakyia & Rotem Katz	Shirim pshutim (Simple songs)	Shlomo Gronich	Bottom 3.
Ma'ayan Hajbi & Birgitta Växler	Yesh lakh oti (You have me)	Tislam	
Adi Avishay & Ben Tzuk	Hazmana lehatuna (An invitation for the wedding)	Ori Banai	Bottom 3.
Matan Kauffman & Oz Tzechovoy	Domino	Arkadi Duchin	Bottom 3.
Carmel Eckman & Lee Biran	Noladeti leshalom (I was born for peace)	Uzi Hitman	
Tair Gamliel & Israel Bar-On	Mi ha'ish (Who's the person)	Various Artists	

The bottom three pairs were Bat-Hen Hakyia and Rotem Katz, Adi Avishay and Ben Tzuk, and Matan Kauffman and Oz Tzechovoy. Each participant sang a solo song and voting was opened again. Ben Tzuk and Oz Tzechovoy were eliminated.

Participant	Song	Original Performer	Info
Adi Avishay	Shmor lakh halom katan (Keep your little dream)	Ehud Manor	
Ben Tzuk	Hadrachim hayedu'ot (The ways of cognition)	Shalom Chanoch	Eliminated.
Oz Tzechovoy	Sof Ha'olam (End of the world)	Aviv Geffen	Eliminated.
Matan Kauffman	Tagidi lo (Tell to him)	Ohad Hitman	
Bat-Hen Hakyia	Hayi sh'ketah (Be quiet)	Rikki Gal	
Rotem Katz	Geshem aharon (Last rain)	Lehakat Pikud Hatzafon	

== Sixth Solo Show - July 21 ==
This show had a theme of songs written by Yitzhak Klepter.

Participant	Song	Original Performer	Info
Ma'ayan Hajbi	Shir ahava bedu'yi (A Bedouin love song )	David Broza	
Lee Biran	Ma she'at ohevet (That what you like)	Gali Atari	
Adi Avishay	Shir hatembel (Simpletons' song)	Kaveret	
Matan Kauffman	Hi kol kakh yafa (She's so magnificent)	Ephraim Shamir	Eliminated.
Rotem Katz	Ha'ahava sheli lo ha'ahava shelo (My sweetheart isn't his sweetheart)	Yitzak Klepter	
Israel Bar-On	Ani ohev (I love)	Yitzak Klepter	Awarded as the best performance by the judges.
Carmel Eckman	Kakha hi ba'emtza (Thus she's in the middle)	Kaveret	
Tair Gamliel	Rak etmol (Only yesterday)	Gali Atari	Eliminated.
Birgitta Växler	Sof ha'ona (End of the season)	Gali Atari	
Bat-Hen Hakyia	Nifgashnu (We met)	Yitzak Klepter	

== Third Duet Show - July 27 ==
Participant	Song	Original Performer	Info
Lee Biran & Rotem Katz	Nicaht Iti Hakhol (You wan with me everything)	Amir Benyiun	
Bat-Hen Hakyia & Carmel Eckman	Olam Hadash (New world)	Song from movie Disney	Bottom 2.
Adi Avishay & Birgitta Växler	Ma omrot einayih (what do your eyes say)	Ofra Haza	Bottom 2.
Ma'ayan Hajbi & Israel Bar-On	Milionim (Million)	Etti Ankri	

The bottom two pairs were Bat-Hen Hakyia and Carmel Eckman and Adi Avishay and Birgitta Växler. For the solo section, Sisters G and Aviv Meshulam made a surprise return along to participate. After voting was done, Bat-Hen Hakyia was eliminated.

Participant	Song	Original Performer	Info
Carmel Eckman	Balaylot hastav (During autumn nights)	Shem-Tov Levy	
Bat-Hen Hakyia	Hafec Hayim (Desire for life)	Yardena Arazi	Eliminated.
Adi Avishay	Gan Meir (public park in Tel Aviv)	Dana Berger	
Birgitta Växler	Yam harachamim (Sea of mercy)	Kobi Aflalo	
Sisters G.	Rega prati (Private moment)	Rita	
Aviv Meshulam	Ze koreh (It happens)	Arik Levy	

== Sixth Solo Show - July 28 ==
This show had a theme of songs written by Yehudit Ravitz.

Participant	Song	Original Performer	Info
Birgitta Växler	Rahavat harikudim (Dancefloor)	Yehudit Ravitz	
Sisters G.	Rey'idat adama (Earthquake)	Yehudit Ravitz	Eliminated.
Aviv Meshulam	Bach lo noge'a (Don't touch you)	Yehudit Ravitz	
Israel Bar-On	Ga'agu'a (Longing)	Yehudit Ravitz	
Ma'ayan Hajbi	Tmuna (Picture)	Yehudit Ravitz	
Rotem Katz	Yaldut Nishkakhat (Forgotten childhood)	Yehudit Ravitz	
Carmel Eckman	Mishana leshana (From year to year)	Yehudit Ravitz	Awarded as the best performance by the judges.
Adi Avishay	Ha'agadat Ophely'ah (The legend of Ophelia)	Yehudit Ravitz	
Lee Biran	Ahava yomyomit (Everyday love)	Yehudit Ravitz	

== Seventh Solo Show - August 3 ==
This show had a theme of Hebrew songs with Greek origin (this style is also called "Yam Hatikhon" - Mediterranean Sea

Participant	Song	Original Performer	Info
Ma'ayan Hajbi	Pne'yi mal'ah (Angel's face)	Yoav Yitzhak	
Carmel Eckman	A'ylu Hayiti Itkha (If I were with you)	Yehudit Tamir	
Birgitta Växler	Halom matok (Sweet dream)	Moshik Ofy'ia & Shlomi Sarnega	Eliminated.
Israel Bar-On	Shek'shenavo (When we arrive)	Miki Gavrielov	
Rotem Katz	Hakol biglal ha'ahava (Everything because of love)	Yehoram Gaon	
Lee Biran	Einayim sheli (My eyes)	Yehuda Poliker	Awarded as the best performance by the judges.
Aviv Meshulam	Kapayim (Applause)	Yehuda Poliker	
Adi Avishay	Hakolot shel Pire'us (The voices of Piraeus)	Haim Moshe	

== Eighth Solo Show - August 4 ==
This show had a theme of songs written by Ivri Lider.

Participant	Song	Original Performer	Info
Israel Bar-On	Nissim (Hebrew boy name)	Ivri Lider	Awarded as the best performance by the judges.
Rotem Katz	Zachiti le'ehov (I have won love)	Ivri Lider	Eliminated.
Lee Biran	Tamid ahava (Always love)	Ivri Lider	
Adi Avishay	K'shehakol ya'avor (When all will pass)	Ivri Lider	
Aviv Meshulam	Kama kokhav (How much a star)	Ivri Lider	
Carmel Eckman	Zeh lo oto davar (It's not the same)	Ivri Lider	
Ma'ayan Hajbi			(Didn't perform because of religious reasons).

== Fourth Duet Show - August 10 ==
Participant	Song	Original Performer	Info
Adi Avishay & Lee Biran	Lo omeret klum ((She) Doesn't say anything)	Metropolin	
Carmel Eckman & Ma'ayan Hajbi	Shlah et ami (Send my people)	Folk	
Lee Biran & Israel Bar-On	Yesh bi ahava (There is love in me)	Arkadi Duchin	
Carmel Eckman & Aviv Meshulam	Egda Yapanit (A Japanese legend)	Arik Sinai	
Adi Avishay & Ma'ayan Hajbi	Gan na'ul (Locked garden)	Shuki & Dorit	
Aviv Meshulam & Israel Bar-On	Hakol ad lekhan (All up to this point)	Amir Beniun	Top Duet

In this round only performers of the best duet passed to next day, it means, that Adi, Ma'ayan, Libi and Carmel all sang solos and the voting was opened again and finally, Adi Avishay was eliminated.

Participant	Song	Original Performer	Info
Adi Avishay	Adaber itkha (I will talk with you)	Chava Alberstein	Eliminated.
Ma'ayan Hajbi	Gavriel	Ofra Haza	
Lee Biran	Sivan	yigal Bashan	
Carmel Eckman	Al nu telekh (You mustn't go)	Shlomo Gronich	

As a special host, performed in this round Keren Peles her new single "Peugeot ´92"

== Ninth Solo Show - August 11 ==
This show had a theme of songs written by Shlomo Artzi.

Participant	Song	Original Performer	Info
Carmel Eckman	Talpeni talpeni (Make a phone call)	Shlomo Artzi	
Aviv Meshulam	Akhrei Hakol At Shir (After all you're a song)	Shlomo Artzi	Eliminated.
Israel Bar-On	Sha'alti mah karah (I asked what happened)	Shlomo Artzi	
Ma'ayan Hajbi	Melekh ha'olam (King of the world)	Shlomo Artzi	
Lee Biran	Ha'ahava hayeshanah (The old love)	Shlomo Artzi	
Carmel Eckman	Gever holekh le'ibud (Man walks to ruin)	Shlomo Artzi	
Aviv Meshulam	Anakhnu lo tz'rihim (We don't need)	Shlomo Artzi	Eliminated.
Israel Bar-On	Absurd	Shlomo Artzi	
Ma'ayan Hajbi	Ma'avir daf (Flipping a page)	Shlomo Artzi	
Lee Biran	Hardufim (Oleanders)	Shlomo Artzi	Awarded as the best performance by the judges.

== Live shows ==
Contestant	Week 1	Week 2	Week 3	Week 4	Week 5	Week 6	Week 7	Week 8	Week 9
Israel Bar-On	Safe	Safe	Safe	Safe	Safe	Safe	Safe	Safe	Winner (week 9)
Lee Biran	Safe	Safe	Safe	Safe	Safe	Safe	Safe	Safe	2nd Runner Up (week 9)
Carmel Eckman	Safe	Safe	Safe	Safe	Safe	Safe	Safe	Safe	1st Runner-Up (week 9)
Ma'ayan Hajbi	Safe	Safe	Safe	Safe	Safe	Safe	Safe	Eliminated (week 8)	
Aviv Meshulam	Safe	Safe	Eliminated	Returned	Safe	Safe	Eliminated (week 7)		
Adi Avishay	Safe	Safe	Safe	Safe	Safe	Safe	Eliminated (week 7)		
Rotem Katz	Safe	Safe	Safe	Safe	Safe	Eliminated (week 6)			
Birgitta Växler	Safe	Safe	Safe	Safe	Safe	Eliminated (week 6)			
Sisters G	Safe	Safe	Eliminated	Returned	Eliminated (week 5)				
Bat-Hen Hakyia	Safe	Safe	Safe	Eliminated (week 5)					
Tair Gamliel	Safe	Safe	Safe	Eliminated (week 4)					
Matan Kauffman	Safe	Safe	Safe	Eliminated (week 4)					
Ben Tzuk	Safe	Safe	Safe	Eliminated (week 4)					
Oz Tzechovoy	Safe	Safe	Safe	Safe	Eliminated (week 4)				
Sagi Trabelsi	Safe	Eliminated (week 2)							
Michal Jakubowicz	Safe	Eliminated (week 2)							
Daniel Kri'ef	Safe	Eliminated (week 2)							
Alex Krul	Eliminated (week 1)								
Moran Shmueli	Eliminated (week 1)								

== See also ==
- American Idol
