= Israeli military ensembles =

Musical acts in the Israeli military

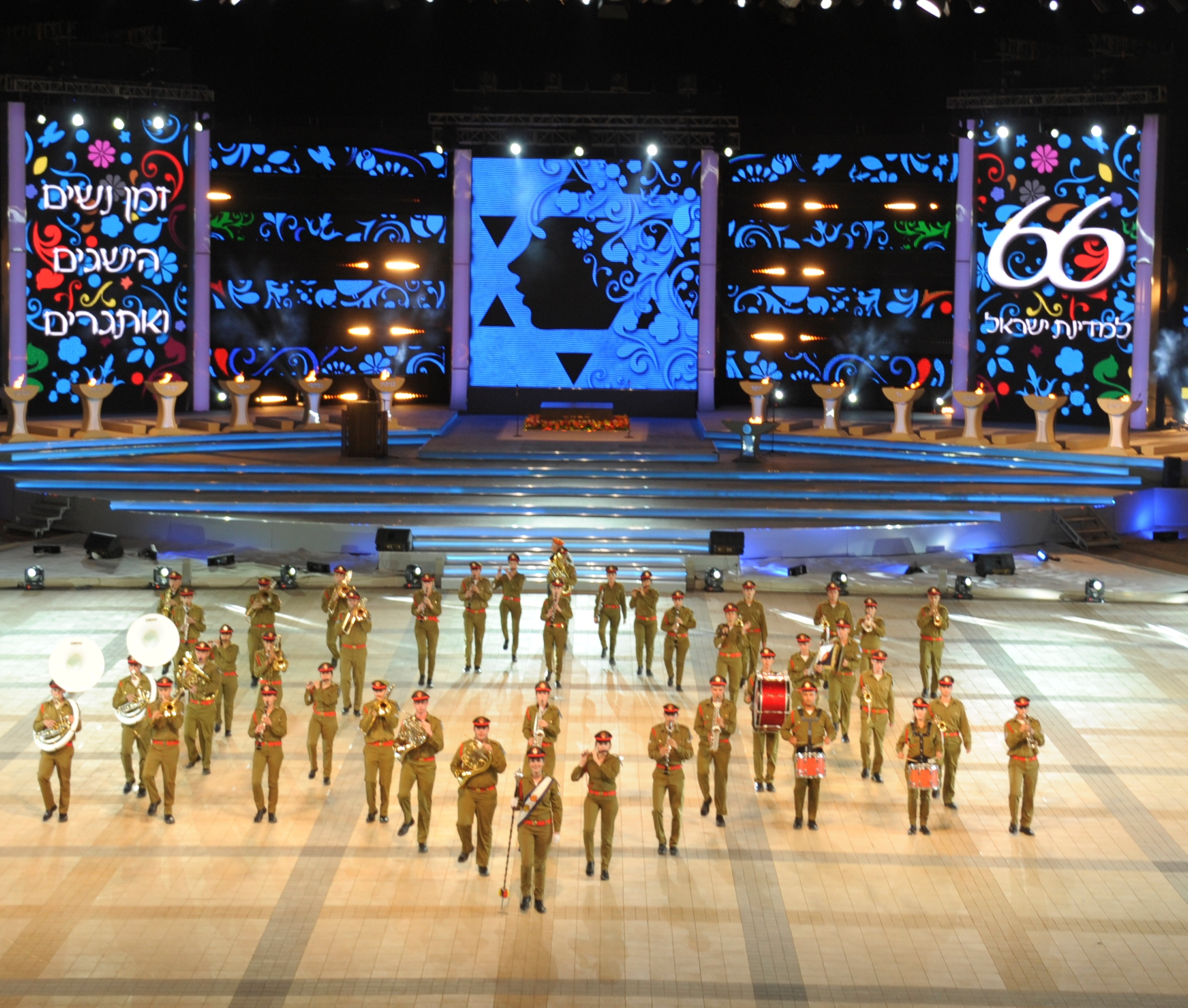
The Israel Defense Forces Orchestra forming a Star of David during the Torch-lighting Ceremony.

Israeli military ensembles (Hebrew: להקות צבאיות בישראל, lehakot tzva’iyot) are musical and performing groups maintained by the Israel Defense Forces (IDF), the military of the State of Israel. These ensembles are generally divided into two categories: military bands and entertainment troupes.

Military bands perform martial music at official state and military ceremonies, providing accompaniment for parades, commemorations, and other formal events. Entertainment troupes present musical and theatrical performances, often including songs and sketches, for soldiers and the general public. Members of these ensembles typically include musicians, singers, and performers who are selected through auditions conducted prior to their compulsory military service.

== History ==
Before the establishment of the State of Israel in 1948, military bands were active in Palestine for several decades. During the British Mandate in Palestine, the British Army regularly rotated its regimental bands stationed in the territory. Local ensembles, such as the Alexandroni Brigade Band, also existed. Among the last British regimental bands to serve in the area were those of the Royal Irish Fusiliers, the Argyll and Sutherland Highlanders, and the King’s Own Scottish Borderers.

Following the creation of Israel, military bands within the new state were typically composed of small groups of soldiers, often serving in remote battalions during the country’s first two decades. The first official Israeli military band, the IDF Orchestra, was formed through the merger of four pre-state ensembles. Jewish musicians, particularly settlers from the Soviet Union and Eastern Europe such as Izhak Muse and Michael Yaaran, later joined and contributed to its development.

"Mount Hermon Kingdom", a 1968 single by the Northern Command Band, popular in its release and to this day in Israel. It is an example of the typical Waltz-style of music that Israeli military bands of the 50s and 60s would often perform.

One of the earliest and most influential pre-state ensembles was the Chizbatron, the Palmach’s song and entertainment troupe, which was active from 1948 to 1950. In the early years of the IDF, military bands became popular both among soldiers and the general public. They performed widely, produced recordings, and many of their songs gained significant radio exposure. Their programs featured original Hebrew songs—frequently centered on themes of army life—combined with short comedic sketches. Directors placed emphasis on choreographed performances that visually expressed the lyrics through movement and pantomime, a style that became characteristic of Israeli military ensembles.

Founded in 1951, Lehakat HaNahal was the most prominent Israeli military ensemble. Many of its alumni later formed successful civilian ensembles, including Batzal Yarok and HaTarnegolim. The period between the Six-Day War (1967) and the Yom Kippur War (1973) is regarded as the golden age of Israeli military ensembles. During this period, most branches of the IDF and several brigades maintained their own ensembles. Numerous Israeli entertainers received their music education in military ensembles rather than in music schools. While the ensembles enjoyed a lot of popularity, there were concerns raised about their financial cost and artistic integrity. The financial concerns were part of what motivated Rafael Eitan's decision to disband most of the ensembles in 1978.

In 1978, General Rafael Eitan, the IDF's Chief of the General Staff, ordered the disbandment of most military ensembles, consolidating official musical duties under the IDF Orchestra. The ensembles were reestablished after Eitan left the position, and initially enjoyed a good amount of popularity, however, a major scandal in the Central Command Band caused a drift in the public perception of the ensembles. In subsequent years, smaller theatrical music troupes emerged, continuing aspects of the earlier tradition in a more limited form.

Contemporary IDF bands share characteristics with their American and British counterparts, while the IDF Orchestra retains stylistic features influenced by Russian military bands, notably the positioning of trumpeters at the front. Contemporary IDF musical units perform for soldiers at bases across Israel, participate in state ceremonies, and appear at fundraising and public events in Israel and abroad.

== Defence Forces Orchestra ==
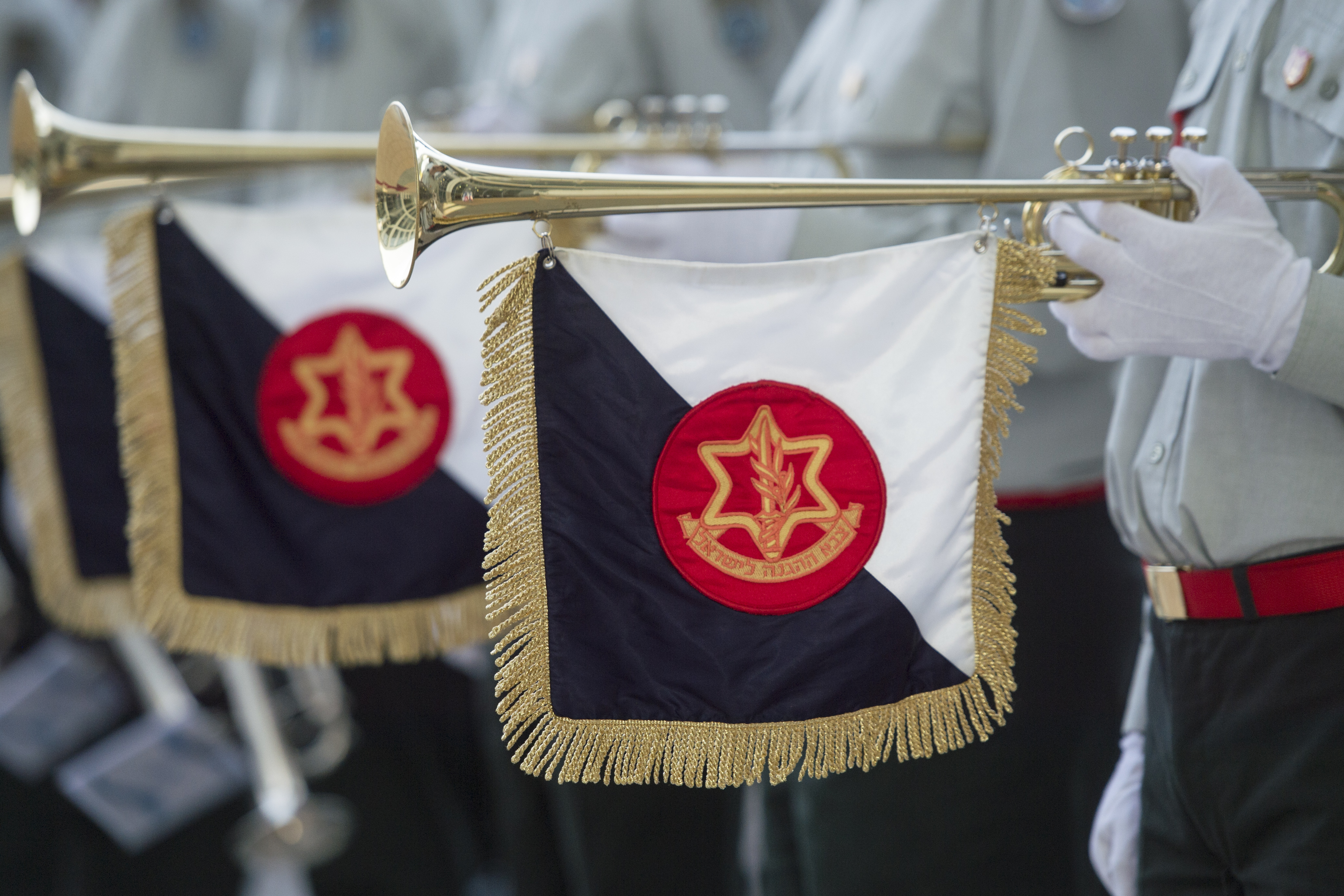
A fanfare trumpet of the IDF Orchestra in May 2017

The Israel Defense Forces Orchestra (Tizmoret Tzahal) is the main musical ensemble of the Israel Defense Forces (IDF). It is the flagship ensemble of the IDF and responsible for live musical accompaniment at all national events taking place in the capitals of Tel Aviv and Jerusalem. It often performs at official military ceremonies and honor guards in the IDF. It is located in at Aviv Camp in the neighborhood of Ramat Aviv. It was established in 1948 out of four orchestras: The Alexandria Division Band, The Jewish Brigade Band, The Artillery Corps Band and The Givati Brigade Band. Its first conductor was Izhak Muse, a Soviet immigrant who played wind instruments. Since the 2000s, the orchestra has performs annually at the Rishon LeZion Festival on Sukkot has become a tradition.

== IDF Rabbinate Choir ==
The IDF Military Rabbinate Choir was established in 1967 as part of the IDF Orchestra to strengthen the connection of soldiers to religious life and Jewish culture. Since its establishment, the choir's repertoire has included Hasidic songs, traditional songs as well as selections of folk songs. The original conductor, Menashe Lev-Ran, was responsible for adaptation of these various songs into a military format. After the Six-Day War, the choir put together its first program and, after the Yom Kippur War, recorded four albums with four programs. In 1977, a choral album was released that included four new songs. Because the choir is the only military band without singers, it performs in various military ceremonies such as the swearing-in, track-ending ceremonies and the like, especially in combat units, where there is a high percentage of soldiers and religious commanders and their families. The most prominent of its former members are Zion Golan, Moshe Lion, and Dudu Fisher. Outside the IDF Orchestra, it is also part of the Military Rabbinate.

== IDF Choir ==
The IDF Choir was established in 1978 after the disbandment of the Israeli military ensembles. After the decision of Chief of Staff Rafael Eitan's to disbandment of the Israeli military ensembles, a new IDF entertainment body was established, which was supposed to replace the existing military ensembles. Following the dissolution, more and more members of the Israeli military ensembles joined the "IDF Choir", which operated until 1980.

== Regional and musical ensembles past and present ==
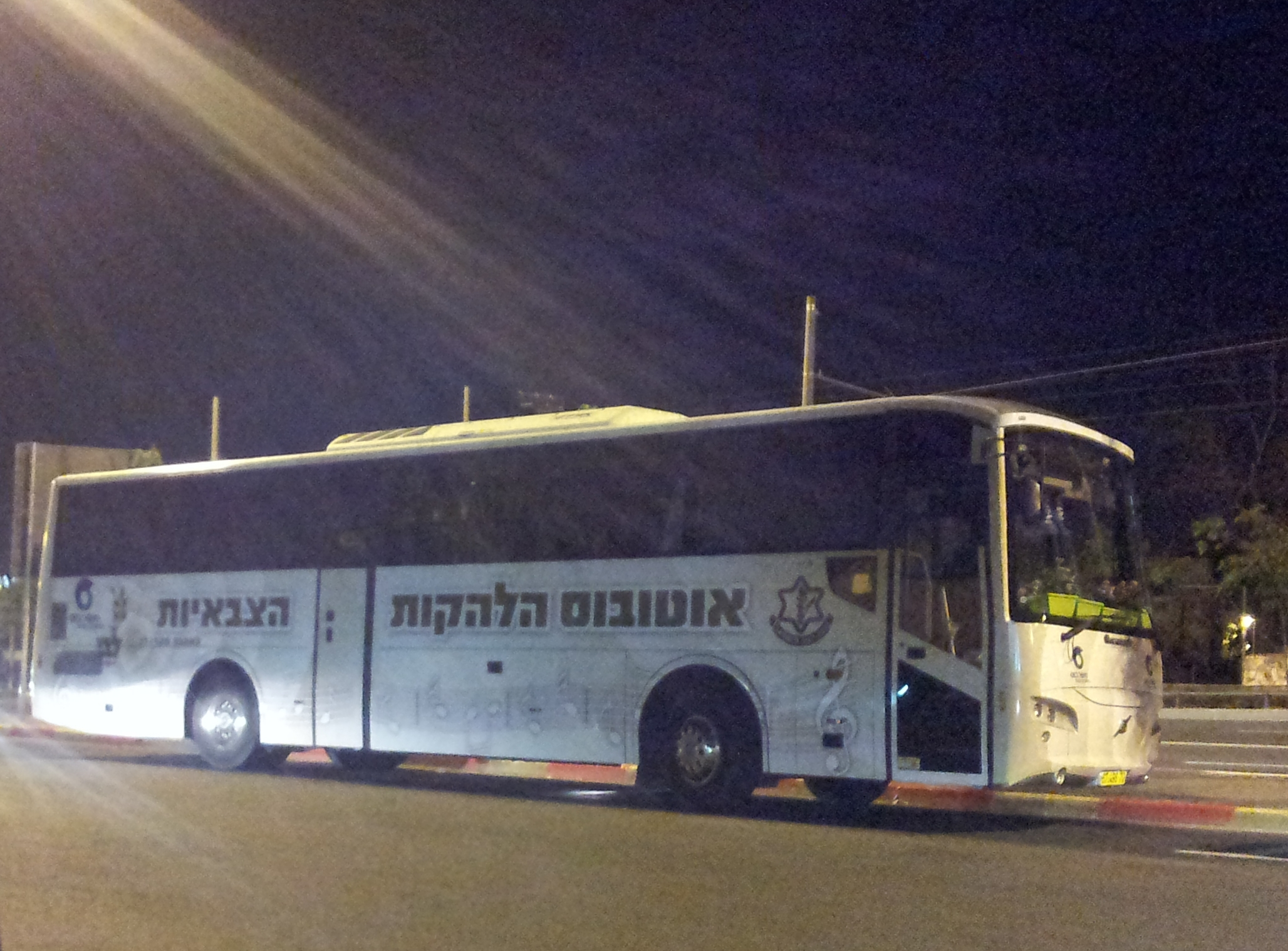
An army tour bus

The following ensembles are part of the IDF and other Israeli military:

- Chizbatron, a Palmach and IDF band, considered to be the first military band established in Israel.
- Israeli Air Force Band
- Israeli Navy Band
- Lehakat HaNahal
- Carmeli Brigade Band
- Givati Brigade Band
- Golani Brigade Band
- Artillery Corps Band
- Gadna Band
- Education and Youth Corps Band
- GOC Army Headquarters Band
- Central Command Band
- Northern Command Band
- Southern Command Band
- Air Force Entertainment Team
- Israeli Combat Engineering Corps Band
- Paratroopers Brigade Band
- Golan Heights Team
- Armored Corps Band
- Tel Litvinsky Band

All IDF bands are found in the Education and Youth Corps of the IDF's Manpower Directorate. While this applies to most military bands, the IDF Orchestra belongs to the directorate's Regime and Discipline Branch that is responsible for Israel's state and military events. The Outstanding Musicians Program is the most common avenue that soldiers take to develop their musical skills during their military service.

It is worth to mention the Jewish military bands of the Second World War. In 1942, the Jewish Military Band was established. In 1944 Ma'ain Ze (literally "This Kind") band of the Jewish Brigade, a military formation of the British Army, was established under the jurisdiction of ENSA and directed by Eliahu Goldenberg. In English, was known under the name "The Palestinians".

== Pivotal music directors ==
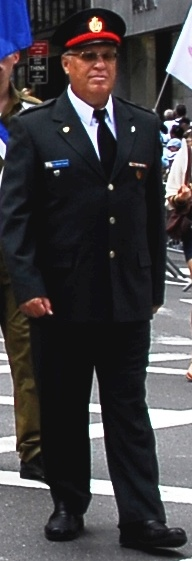
Russian-Israeli military music director Michael Yaaran in 2008

- Shalom Ronli-Riklis, expanded the then new IDF Band to become a prominent musical ensemble in Israel. Under his leadership, it became the only army band in the world to have two orchestras: a symphonic orchestra, founded and a wind ensemble.
- Emanuel Amiran-Pougatchov, an army director who later served as the first appointed Inspector of Music (Minister for Music Education)
- Erich Tych, the founder of the Israeli Air Force Band who led the unit for 35 years until his death in 1983.
- Dov Seltzer, one of the founders as well as the first official composer for the Lehakat Hanachal. The songs he wrote for the band are today considered to be cornerstones of Israeli folk and popular music and are part of the standard repertoire for radio and TV in Israel and around the world.
- Moshe Wilensky, he was a composer for multiple musical troupes of the IDF.
- Yair Rosenblum, he conducted and composed many songs for ensembles in the Israeli Army and the Israeli Navy, and is known best for songs such as Shir LaShalom. He was musical director of the rabbinical choir in the 1960s and 1970s and has also directed many Israeli music festivals.
- Dani Litai was an Israeli entertainment manager. He worked with and directed several Israeli military ensembles. He is recognized as a prominent figure in Israeli entertainment industry. Under his guidance a number of Israeli entertainers launcher their careers.

== In popular culture ==
- The Band was a 1978 comedic musical, depicting an army singing group in 1968.

== See also ==
- Royal Corps of Army Music
- United States military bands
- Russian military bands
- Jordanian Armed Forces Band
- Israel Police Orchestra
- Military band § Israel
