= David Refael ben-Ami =

Israeli singer (1950–2020)

David Refael ben-Ami דוד רפאל בן-עמי
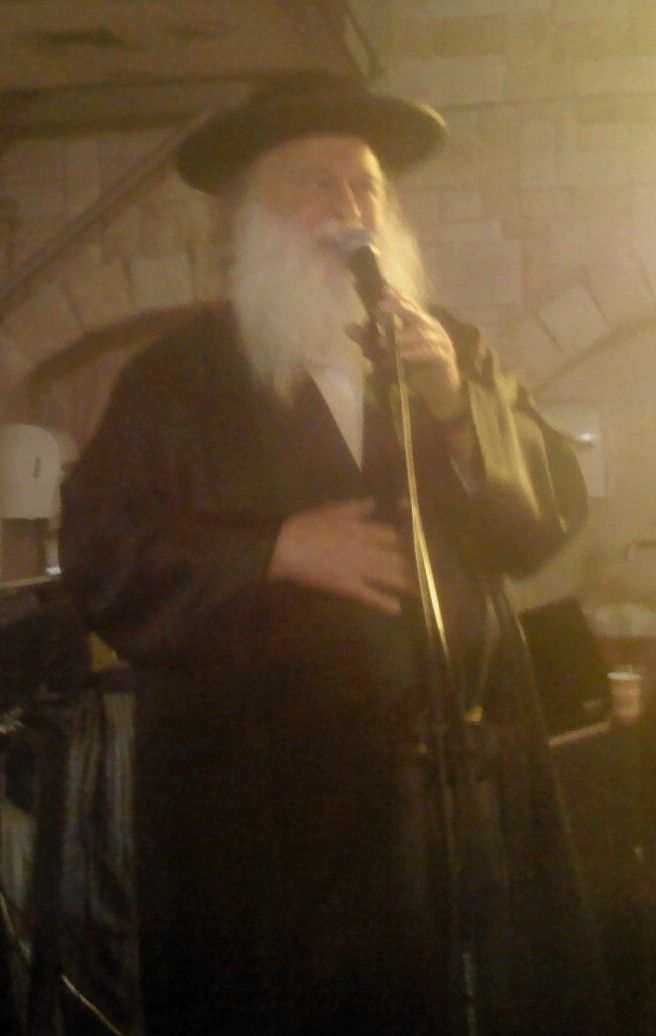
- David Refael ben-Ami singing at a gathering with Rabbi Yitzchak Ginsburgh

Background information
- Also known as: Dadi
- Born: David ben-Ami; 8 October 1950; Nahalal, Israel.
- Died: 9 October 2020 (aged 70) Israel
- Occupation: Singer
- Years active: 1970–2020
- Formerly of: Northern Command Band

David Refael ben-Ami (Hebrew: דוד רפאל בן-עמי; 8 October 1950 – 9 October 2020) was an Israeli singer. In 1970, he recorded the song "Desdemona," which was composed for him by Mati Caspi and written by Gad Kaynar. In 1971, Desdemona reached the top of the Israeli Hit Parade.

== Early life and military ==
David ben-Ami (nicknamed "Dadi" from an early age) was born to one of the founding families of the Nahalal moshav. In his youth, he studied drama with the theater director and acting teacher Nola Chilton. He served in the IDF in the Southern Command Band and in the Northern Command Band. After his release from the army, he studied theater studies at Tel-Aviv University and worked as an actor in the Cameri Theater.

A short time later, he began his return to Jewish religious practice under the direction of Rabbi Israel Meir Lau and Rabbi Yitzchak Ginsburgh. Influenced by friends from the Chabad Chassidic school of thought, he traveled to New York to spend an entire year in the court of the Lubavitcher Rebbe Rabbi Menachem Mendel Schneerson. Eventually, he returned to Jerusalem and chose to follow the directives of Breslov Chassidism. As part of his becoming a ba'al teshuva, he began to use his full name "David Refael" and his original family name "Feinshil" which was used by his ancestors in the Diaspora. His grandfather, who immigrated to Israel during the second aliya, had Hebraicised it to "Ben-Ami".

For many years, he abandoned his musical career and focused on anthologizing ancient Chassidic melodies from the elderly people of the Meah Shearim neighborhood in Jerusalem, which he performed in his albums from 1988 onwards. He stated, "My mission is to endow the songs and to perpetuate the melodies." In his appearances, he performed Israeli songs, and in one of his later albums, he sings Israeli songs and tunes that were inspired prior to the establishment of the State of Israel.

== Death ==
David ben-Ami contracted COVID-19 during the COVID-19 pandemic in Israel. He was hospitalized on October 7, 2020, when his health conditions worsened. He died on 9 October 2020, one day after his 70th birthday.

== Discography ==
- Melodies of Rabbi Nachman of Breslov and his students, 3 discs.
- We are for God and our eyes are to God - 2006.
