= Litai (disambiguation) =

Litai usually refers to Lithuanian litas (plural litai).

Litai may also refer to:

- Litae, daughters of Zeus in Greek mythology
- Litai, Shandong, a town in Yanggu County, Shandong, China
- Litai Township, a township in Xianyang, Shaanxi, China
- Litai (surname), a Hebrew surname
