= Lehakat Pikud Darom =

Israeli military entertainment band

Southern Command Band להקת פיקוד הדרום
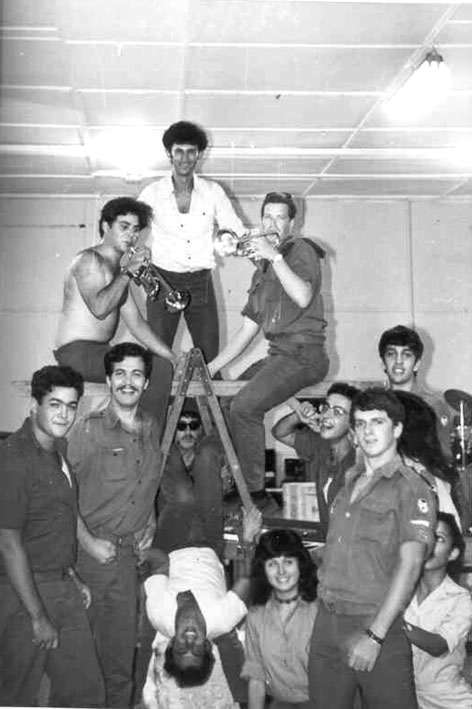
- Members of the Southern Command Band rehearsing in 1973

Background information
- Origin: Southern District, Israel.
- Genres: Israeli folk, Israeli rock
- Years active: 1952-1954, 1968-1978, 1985-present
- Labels: Hed Arzi Music, NMC

Lehakat Pikud Darom, also known as Lehakat Pikud HaDarom (Hebrew: להקת פיקוד הדרום, lit. 'Southern Command Band') is the musical military ensemble for the Southern Command of the Israel Defense Forces.

Formed in 1952, the band went through several iterations, with their second iteration being the most successful, achieving success during the War of Attrition and its aftermath in the early 1970s.

Many of the band's songs have become standards in Israeli culture, and the band has many notable members in its history.

== History ==
=== 1952-1954: Early history and obscurity ===
The Southern Command Band was formed in 1952 under the orders of Avraham Tzvion, an officer in the Education and Youth Corps. Most of the band's members were Bulgarian Jews and Romanian Jews who did not have a good grasp of the Hebrew language. The band's first program was titled "Casablanca Got A Promotion". The program was a comedic play and did not have any musical compositions. The program received a positive review on Davar, but otherwise did not receive any attention from the Israeli press. The band's next program was titled "Announcing on Israeli Army Radio", and was their first to focus primarily on musical compositions. Like the previous one, it did not receive much attention from the Israeli press, outside of a review on Bamahane. The ensemble's next two programs of 1953, "Nothing new in the South" and "A Land without Girls" did not receive any attention at all from the Israeli press and remain relatively obscure. "A Land without Girls" was not particularly popular within the Southern Command, either, and the original form of the program was withdrawn, with the replacement program being made up of songs in Bulgarian and Russian. The final program this iteration of the troupe made was titled "This is the Job", and like the last few, it did not receive any attention at all. The band was disbanded due to changes in the chain of command in the Education and Youth Corps, in particular, the departure of the band's founder, Avraham Tzvion, from the Corps. As a result, half of the band's members were discharged while the other half was reassigned to the newly formed Northern Command Band, including Yaakov Bodo, who would lead the newly formed band in its early years.

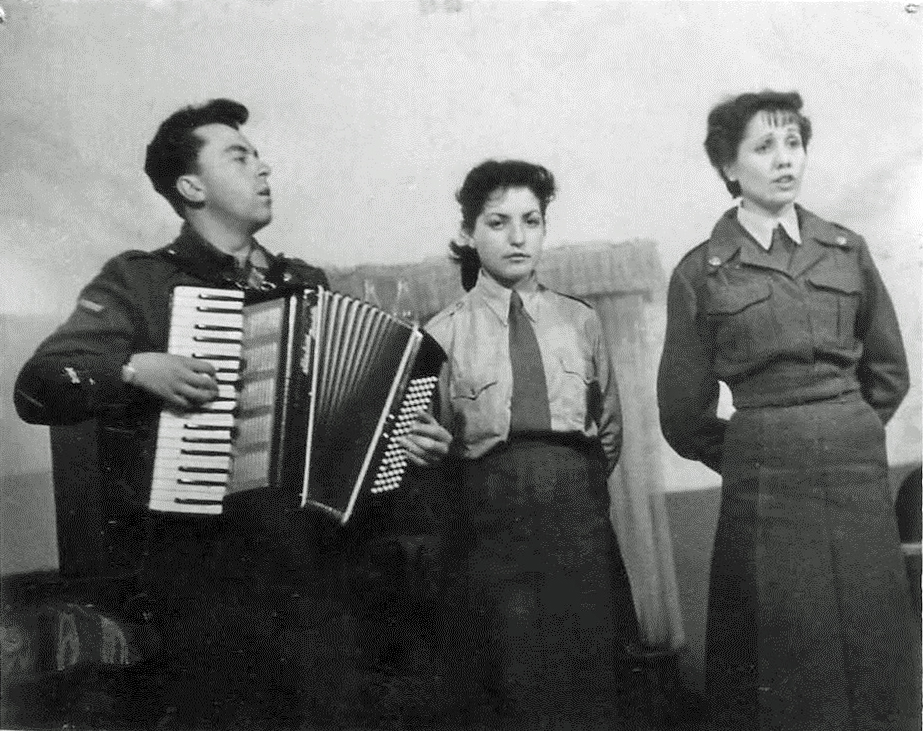
The Southern Command Band in the 1950s

=== 1968-1978: Reformation ===
While there are mentions of the band's name in the Israeli press before 1968, it is unclear if this is the same band or not. There were plans to reform the band as far back as 1965, alongside the Israeli Navy Band, but it is unlikely that these plans were fulfilled.

Ultimately, the band was reformed in 1968 under the orders of the then Southern Command Aluf, Yeshayahu Gavish, who reformed them on the grounds that they'd be useful for morale purposes during the War of Attrition. The first program of this incarnation of the band was titled "Music in the South", and the band's lineup featured the likes of Matti Caspi. This was the band's first program to receive an album, which was issued by Hed Arzi Music. Notable songs from this program include "Loving Life" and "It Will Be On That Day", both by Yovav Katz, the latter being based on verses from the Book of Isaiah. The band's follow-up program "Around the Turn" did not achieve much success, nor did it receive an album.

The third program of this iteration of the band was titled "Maoz Alef Alef" and it became the band's mainstream breakthrough, receiving acclaim from critics, with many of the songs from the program becoming successful singles. One such song was "I'm Dying" written by Yoram Taharlev and composed by one of the members of the band, Matti Caspi. The program also received an album issued by Hed Arzi Music. The band was voted Band of the Year and won the Kinor David by the end of the year.

The follow-up program, "Eagles in the Arabah" began rehearsals in March 1971, premiering later that same month. Like with their last program, it received acclaim and was quite successful. The band once again won the Kinor David at the end of the year. Likewise, it received an album issued by Hed Arzi Music. The most notable song from this program is "Praise the Stronghold" by Naomi Shemer.

The band's tenth program, "From the South, Goodness will emerge." featured some of their most successful songs, such as "Elad Went Down to the Jordan" by Avraham Zigman and "The Land of Israel Is Beautiful" by Dudu Barak. The band made consistent television performances on Channel 1 for this program.

The ensemble's final program before the Yom Kippur War was titled "Sights of the South", a program centering around sights in the South of Israel and the Sinai Peninsula.

The troupe's twelfth program, "Some Sand in the Coffee" premiered after the Yom Kippur War and did not live up to the success of the previous programs, with the only notable song being "They journeyed and encamped", which took inspiration from The Exodus.

The final program of this iteration of the troupe was titled "Class Reunion" and it was a play made up of songs written entirely by Yoram Taharlev. Despite his best efforts, the program was received negatively by the Israeli press.

Like with all of the IDF entertainment troupes, the band was disbanded under the orders of Chief of the General Staff Rafael Eitan in 1978.

=== 1980s-present: Second reformation ===
The band reformed for the second time in its history in 1985, and their first program and album of this era was titled "The Band Returns". The most notable song from the program is "Givati anthem" by Amos Ettinger. The album of the program was issued by CBS Israel Records.

Their next program, "A Dream in the South" which premiered in 1987, did not receive an album, but it did receive a lot of attention in the Israeli press due to the band winning the Arad Festival that year with the song "A Dove carrying an Olive Branch" (referring to a symbol of peace) sung by Haya Samir, an Israeli Arab singer.

Like with all of the IDF entertainment troupes, the Southern Command Band still exists today, but its popularity has declined significantly. In 2024, the band released the song "A Song for the Envelope".

== Notable members ==
- Albert Cohen
- Corinne Allal
- David Refael ben-Ami, who later served in the Northern Command Band
- Efrat Rayten
- Hana Laszlo
- Matti Caspi
- Raz Yirmiya
- Tzipi Shavit
- Yaakov Bodo, who was later assigned to the Northern Command Band

== Discography ==
- Music in the South (1968)
- Maoz Alef Alef (1970)
- Eagles in the Arabah (1971)
- From the South, Goodness will emerge. (1972)
- Some Sand in the Coffee (1973)
- Class Reunion (1975)
- The Band Returns (1985)
