= Kokhav Nolad 5 =

Israeli reality TV show season

- Season 5
- Starring: Tzvika Hadar; Margalit Tzan'ani; Tsedi Tzarfati; Svika Pik; Gal Uchovsky; Yoni Bloch

Release
- Original network: Keshet
- Original release: May 18 – August 29, 2007

Season chronology
- Next → Kokhav Nolad 6

Kokhav Nolad 5 was the 5th season of the popular reality TV show Kokhav Nolad, which focused on finding the next Israeli pop star. It was hosted by Tzvika Hadar with judges Gal Uchovsky, Margalit Tzan'ani, Svika Pik, and Tsedi Tzarfati.

The final of Kokhav Nolad 5 was held on Golan Beach in the eastern side of the kinneret lake (in the west side is the city of Tiberias) on August 29, 2007. After the first semifinal, Zvika Hadar announced that Marina Maximillian Blumin had qualified. In the second semifinal Boaz Ma'uda won first place in his bracket. Chen Aharoni went into a head-to-head with Shlomi Bar'el, with Shlomi coming out as the victor. As such Marina, Boaz, and Shlomi were the final three contestants. a first for the series was the participation of Miriam Tukan, in the fifth season, becoming the first Arab participant of Kokhav Nolad.

Bo'az Ma'uda won with 50% of the vote, Marina Maximilian Blumin - 27% was runner and Shlomi Bar'el third with 23% of the vote. Bar'el went on to sign a contract with Hed Arzi Music and Blumin with Helicon Records. In addition, Chen Aharoni and Adir Ohayon, reached deals with NMC Music.

== Participants ==
| Men | Women |
|---|---|
| Adir Ohayon (Tel Aviv) | Iris Steinberg (Bat Yam) |
| Oren Caduri (Ramat Gan) | Alisa Shparaga (Netivot) |
| Bo'az Ma'uda (Eliakim) - Winner | Arlin Gold (Tel Aviv) |
| Doron Rokach (Bat Yam) | Limor Amar (Tel Aviv) |
| Daniel Ben Haim (Migdal HaEmek) | Marina Maximilian Blumin (Ben Shemen) |
| Chen Aharoni (Holon) | Moran Kashro (Holon) |
| Nadav Cohen (Netanya) | Mika Hari (Tel Aviv) |
| Nadav Kadmon (Rosh HaAyin | Miriam Tukan (Haifa) |
| Shlomi Bar'el (Ashdod) | Sivan Goriashvili (Ashdod) |
| | Adi Ulmansky (Mevaseret Zion) |
| | Eden Amzaleg (Kiryat Gat) |

== Live shows ==
| Contestant | Week 1 | Week 2 | Week 3 | Week 4 | Week 5 | Week 6 | Week 7 | Week 8 | Week 9 | Week 10 |
|---|---|---|---|---|---|---|---|---|---|---|
| Bo'az Ma'uda | Safe | Safe | Safe | Safe | Safe | Safe | Safe | Safe | Safe | Winner (week 10) |
| Marina Maximilian Blumin | Safe | Safe | Safe | Safe | Safe | Safe | Safe | Safe | Safe | Runner Up (week 10) |
| Shlomi Bar'el | Safe | Safe | Safe | Safe | Safe | Safe | Safe | Safe | Safe | Eliminated (week 10) |
| Chen Aharoni | Safe | Safe | Safe | Safe | Safe | Safe | Returned | Safe | Eliminated (week 9) | |
| Doron Rokach | Safe | Safe | Safe | Safe | Safe | Safe | Safe | Safe | Eliminated (week 9) | |
| Alisa Shparaga | Safe | Safe | Safe | Safe | Safe | Safe | Safe | Safe | Eliminated (week 9) | |
| Daniel Ben Haim | Safe | Safe | Safe | Safe | Safe | Safe | Safe | Eliminated (week 8) | | |
| Adir Ohayon | Safe | Safe | Safe | Safe | Safe | Safe | Eliminated (week 7) | | | |
| Nadav Kadmon | Safe | Safe | Safe | Safe | Safe | Eliminated (week 6) | | | | |
| Miriam Tukan | Safe | Safe | Safe | Safe | Safe | Eliminated (week 6) | | | | |
| Sivan Goriashvili | Safe | Safe | Safe | Safe | Eliminated (week 5) | | | | | |
| Eden Amzaleg | Safe | Safe | Safe | Safe | Eliminated (week 5) | | | | | |
| Arlin Gold | Safe | Safe | Safe | Eliminated (week 4) | | | | | | |
| Mika Hari | Safe | Safe | Safe | Eliminated (week 4) | | | | | | |
| Nadav Cohen | Safe | Safe | Eliminated (week 3) | | | | | | | |
| Oren Caduri | Safe | Safe | Eliminated (week 3) | | | | | | | |
| Adi Ulmansky | Safe | Eliminated (week 2) | | | | | | | | |
| Limor Amar | Safe | Eliminated (week 2) | | | | | | | | |
| Moran Kashro | Eliminated (week 1) | | | | | | | | | |
| Iris Shtenberg | Eliminated (week 1) | | | | | | | | | |

== See also ==
- Kokhav Nolad
- American Idol
