= Lehakat Pikud Tzafon =

Israeli military entertainment band

Northern Command Band להקת פיקוד הצפון
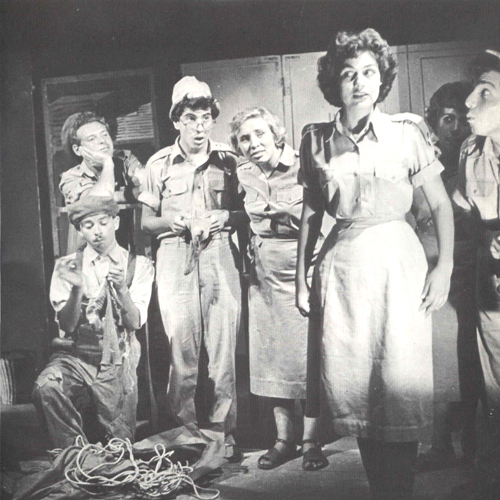
- Lehakat Pikud Tzafon in 1955 during a performance of their first program, "Moshe Ventilator".

Background information
- Origin: Northern District, Israel.
- Genres: Israeli folk, Israeli rock.
- Years active: 1954-1978, 1984-present
- Labels: Hed Arzi Music, CBS, NMC

Lehakat Pikud Tzafon, also known as Lehakat Pikud HaTzafon (Hebrew: להקת פיקוד הצפון, lit. 'Northern Command Band') is the musical military ensemble of the Northern Command of the Israel Defense Forces. Formed in 1954, the Northern Command was the last of the three regional commands to receive a band, after the Southern Command and the Central Command. The band's most successful period was in the aftermath of the Six-Day War, though they had enjoyed success beforehand.

Many of the band's songs have become standards in Israeli culture, and its alumni include several notable figures in Israeli music, entertainment, and show business.

In terms of overall chart success, the band is tied with Lehakat HaNahal, with eight songs that made it to the annual charts.

== History ==
=== 1954-1967: Foundation and early history ===
The Northern Command Band was formed from a merger of a group of entertainers from the then-defunct Southern Command Band and the two members of the Golani Band. One of the notable entertainers to join the band was Yaakov Bodo. Bodo starred in the main role of the band's first program, "Moishe Ventilator." The program was quite successful and even earned a showing in Haifa. The program was a play that contained a total of three songs. It later became an independent play separate from the band itself and was eventually adapted into a movie. The band's next three programs all premiered in 1956 and were all considered failures. The first of the three, "From the North, goodness will flourish." deviated from the debut program's format, adopting a more sketch-based approach that did not succeed. The next two programs, "Sh...sh...shut up!" and "This and that" premiered in May and October of that same year, respectively, to a similar reception as the previous program. The band's fifth program, "Hit and Run" premiered in 1957 and enjoyed decent success, but the band members felt inferior to the more successful Nahal Band. It was the troupe's first program composed entirely of songs rather than a play or comedic sketches.

The sixth program, "We Shall Head North" was the band's most successful program since their debut. The success of the program is often attributed to its head writers, Naomi Shemer and Yohanan Zarai. Notable songs from the program include: "For want of a nail" and the title track, both written and composed by Shemer. It was also the band's first program to earn a vinyl recording in 1958. This success did not carry over to the band's next program, "From Strength to Strength" in 1959.

The 1960s began with a string of successful programs, "Cold and Warm in the North" in 1960, "The Secret Weapon" in 1961 and "A ride to the North" in 1962. Songs from these programs include: "A Melody for Gideon" by Naomi Shemer and "Yael" by Dan Almagor, both of which took inspiration from the Book of Judges. 1963 saw a musical shift in the band, as in addition to the accordion, instruments such as the saxophone, the guitar, and the drums became regular parts of the band's instrumentation from this point onwards. This was first showcased in the 1963 program "Hands Up", where Kobi Oshrat played electric guitar on the song "Los Pikudos Tzfanos", other notable songs from that program include "The North Star", sung by Danny Ben-Israel and later released as a solo single by him. This program was issued as an EP titled "Los Pikudos Tzfanos" by Hed Arzi Music. The troupe's next few programs also enjoyed decent success.

=== 1967-1978: Success and disbandment ===
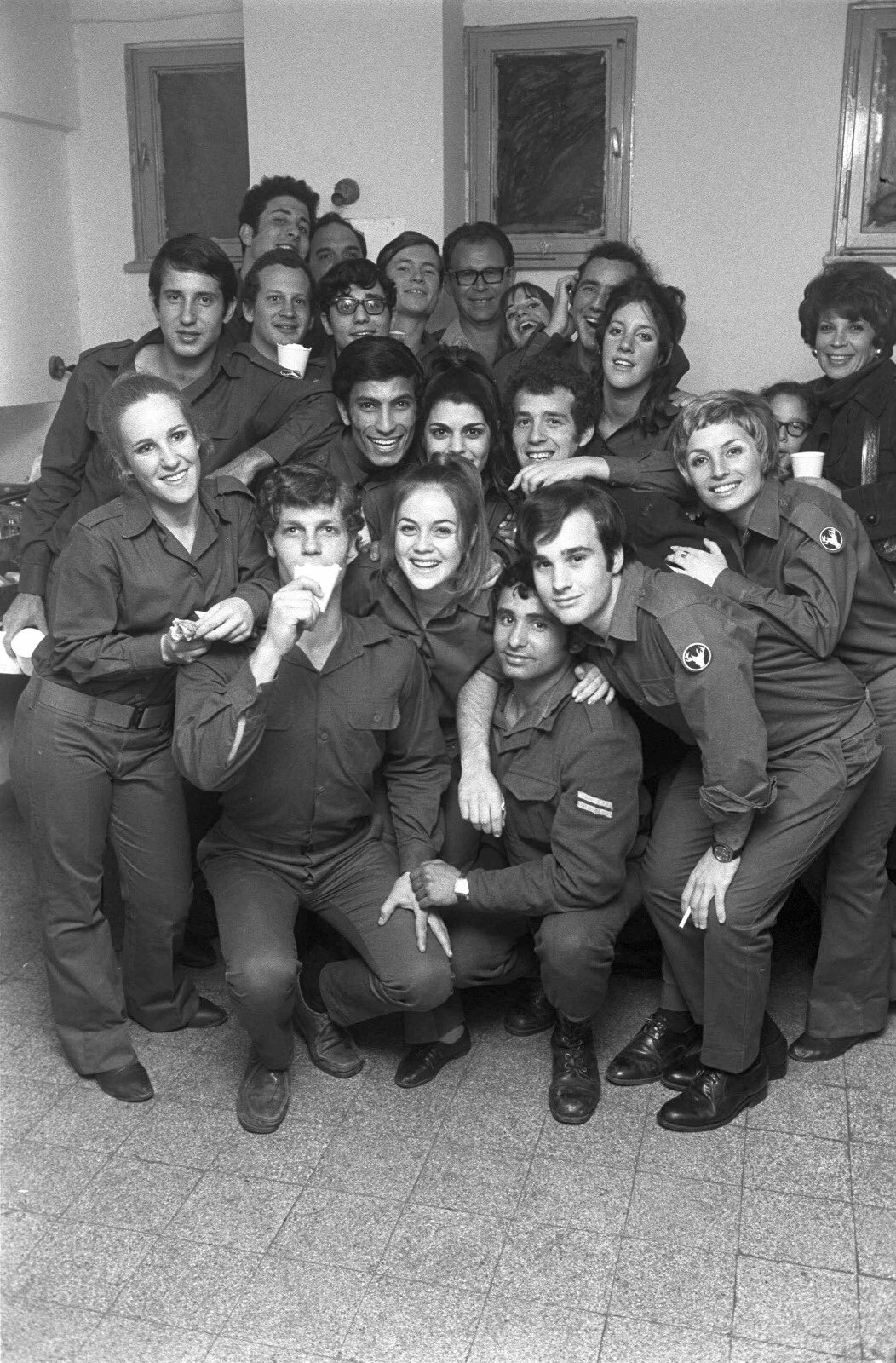
The band during the Yigal Bashan era (1969–1972).

The aftermath of the Six-Day War caused a wave of euphoria that would lead many of the military ensembles to their greatest period of success. This euphoria also applied to the Northern Command Band, which released one of their most popular songs to date and one of the songs most synonymous with the Six-Day War, "Mount Hermon Kingdom". The song came from the band's fifteenth program, "On the Heights", and was a waltz-style song with lyrics by Yovav Katz and a melody composed by Effi Netzer, commemorating the recent occupation of the mountain by the IDF in the form of a love ballad. The song helped start the career of its singer, Mutzi Aviv. The band's programs from 1969 to 1972 were perhaps their most successful of this era, as the band was fronted by Yigal Bashari (Bashan), who sang the songs "To the North, with Love." and "Sweet, Sweet" on the band's seventeenth and eighteenth programs, respectively. (Though both songs were sometimes credited to Bashan only.) "Sweet, Sweet" was especially successful, being selected as the song of the year by both Kol Yisrael and Galatz. The band also toured in the Golan Heights during this time period. Bashan was discharged in 1972, and the band's popularity would begin to decline during this period.

The band's next program, "Northern Wind" saw the band have its first choreographer, Ohad Naharin. The program was also performed in the Sinai Peninsula.

The band's twentieth program, "Hail North" premiered less than a week before the start of the Yom Kippur War, which led to it quickly being dropped. The troupe was also quite unpopular with the then commander of the Northern Command, Rafael Eitan, only exacerbating the situation further. The band was split into two different groups during the war and temporarily halted its activities due to a lack of possible new members caused by the war.

The final program of the original troupe arrived in 1977, titled "A Night in the Backyard." directed by Yair Rosenblum. It was done without the knowledge of Eitan, who had assigned the band to perform a "public singing" program instead. Despite the difficulties, the program was quite successful and earned the ensemble their most successful hits in years, such as the title track, which later ranked at number 2 in the Israeli Annual Hebrew Song Chart of 1977. Other notable songs from the program include "Come with me to the Galilee", a song written by Ehud Manor. The success was short-lived, however, as one of Eitan's first orders after he was promoted to Chief of the General Staff was to disband all of the military ensembles, putting an end to the Northern Command Band.

=== 1984-present ===
In 1983, following Eitan's departure as Chief of the General Staff, the military ensembles would reform. The Northern Command Band was one of the first to reform, and their program "Arise and walk the land." enjoyed unprecedented success. The program was issued as an album by CBS Israel. Rami Kleinstein composed one of the most popular songs of the program, "Your Wonders are Never-Ending" to lyrics by Yoram Taharlev, who also wrote the title track. The band's next program, "Be Here Now" premiered in 1986 to a similar reception. The most notable song from that program was "The Flour Jar", written and composed by Naomi Shemer. The song took inspiration from the First Book of Kings. The band's following program was called "(When a) Citizen enters, a soldier goes out." Unlike the last two programs, it was a musical play, although it did not receive a vinyl recording. In April 1989, one of the troupe's members was investigated as part of a larger investigation against various members of the military ensembles on allegations of illegal possession of cannabis.

While the troupe remains active to this day, like all other military ensembles, its popularity has declined heavily; the band has rerecorded some of its older songs with the new backdrop of the Gaza war, such as "Mount Hermon Kingdom" and "The North Star" in 2024.

== Notable members ==
- Aryeh Moskona
- Benny Berman
- Danny Ben-Israel, frontman of the troupe from 1963 to 1965
- David Refael ben-Ami
- Kobi Oshrat
- Mutzi Aviv, frontman of the troupe from 1966 to 1968.
- Ohad Naharin
- Yaakov Bodo, founding member of the troupe, veteran actor.
- Yehuda Barkan
- Yehuda Elias
- Yigal Bashan, frontman of the troupe from 1969 to 1972.

== Discography ==
- Beware, she drives! (1958)
- Oh! For a nail... (1958)
- The Secret Weapon (1961)
- Los Pikudos Tsafonas (1963)
- Congratulations! (1964)
- Give a smile! (1964)
- All is well in the North (1967)
- On the Heights (1968)
- A bit of this and a bit of that (1969)
- From The North, With Love. (1970)
- Eternal Joy (1971)
- Northern Wind (1972)
- Hail North (1973)
- A Night In The Backyard (1977)
- Arise and walk the land (1984)
- Be Here Now (1986)

== See also ==
- Music of Israel
- Culture of Israel
- Israeli military ensembles
