= Yaakov Bodo =

Israeli actor and comedian (born 1931)

- יעקב בודו
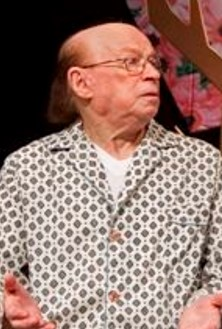
- Born: Iacob Bodoagă; March 28, 1931 (age 95); Ștefănești, Romania
- Occupations: Actor, comedian, entertainer
- Notable work: Moshe Ventilator
- Children: 3

Yaakov Bodo (Hebrew: יעקב (יענק'לה) בודו; born 28 March 1931) is an Israeli actor, comedian and Holocaust survivor.

== Biography ==
Yaakov (Yankele) Bodo was born as Iacob Bodoagă (in Romanian: Iacob Bodoagă) in the town of Ștefănești in Romania. During World War II he wandered with his mother and two sisters until they reached the town of Botoșani. In the Holocaust he was employed in cleaning institutions, shoveling snow off roads, and as a kitchen worker for the Germans.

He spoke only Yiddish until the age of 7. He immigrated with his family to Israel in 1950 and settled in Afula. His grandparents were Zionists who helped establish Kfar Hasidim and Kiryat Haroshet (now part of Kiryat Tiv'on) after they emigrated to Mandate Palestine in 1933.

== Acting and film career ==
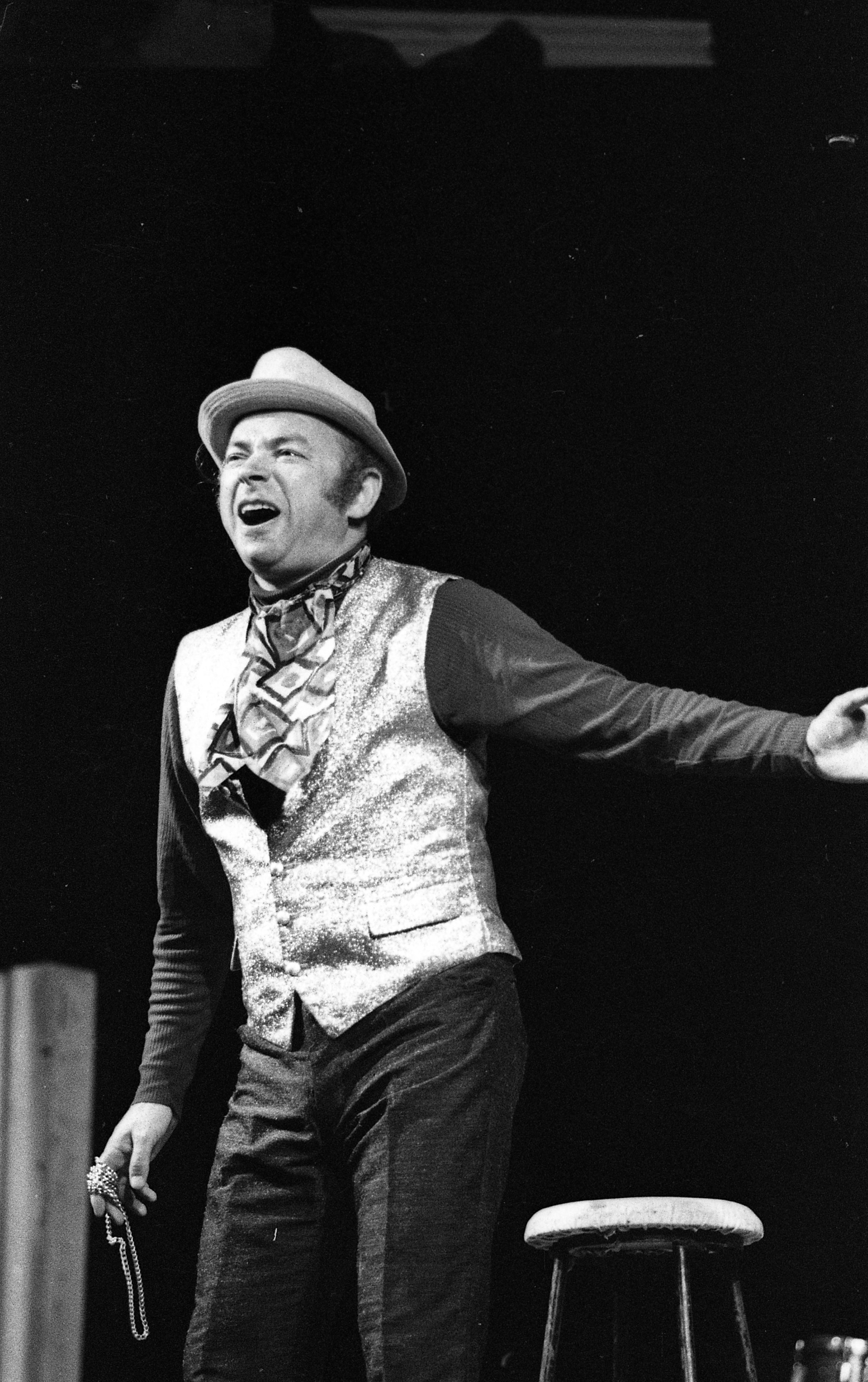
Bodo, 1969

A year after his arrival in Israel, Bodo joined the Israel Defense Forces, where he first assembled and led the Southern Command Band. Following the disbanding of that troupe in 1954, he was assigned the creation of the Northern Command troupe, which he led for three-and-a-half years.

Meanwhile, he came up with his "Moishe Ventilator" character. Upon his release, he starred in a theater show by that name, which was a hit in the 1950s—running more than a thousand times—and which was eventually made into a film version.

Bodo performed on the stages of the institutionalized theaters Zira Theatre , Habima Theatre, Haifa Theatre as well as commercial theater, mostly in Yiddish, where he was successful. In 1992, he joined the Yiddish-Shpiel theatre, where he mostly performs in leading roles. Among the more notable plays he performed in were Maagal HaGir (lit. "The Chalk Circle"), and Karnafim (lit. "Rhinoceroses").

In 1964 he performed in Ephraim Kishon's film Sallah Shabati (Hebrew: סלאח שבתי), alongside Chaim Topol, Gila Almagor, Zaharira Harifai, Shaike Levi, and Arik Einstein. The film was a satirical portrayal of the poor conditions and the integration of the Jewish refugees from Arab lands living in the maabara.

In 1966, Bodo's character, Moishe Ventilator, was picked up and made into a parody film by the same name (Hebrew: מוישה ונטילטור), where, under the direction of Uri Zohar, Bodo, accompanied by Shaike Ophir and the Gashah HaHiver trio, portrayed a frugal private whose cost-cutting ideas include cutting on maps in the operation room, which are coveted by a spy who infiltrates the IDF ranks.

In 1967, he performed in Kishon's film Ervinka (Hebrew: ארבינקא, Starred by Chaim Topol), about an incorrigible layabout who becomes involved in a robbery of the Israeli lottery under the cover of making a documentary.

Bodo also performed The Fox in the Chicken Coop (Hebrew: השועל בלול התרנגולות), Nahche and The General (Hebrew: נחצ'ה והגנרל), Millionaire in Trouble (Hebrew: מיליונר בצרות), My Margo (Hebrew: מרגו שלי), Take When They Give (Hebrew: כשנותנים קח), Five Five (Hebrew: חמש חמש), A Miracle in The Village (Hebrew: נס בעיירה), Just Not on Saturday (Hebrew: רק לא בשבת), Not a Word to Morgenstern (Hebrew: אף מילה למורגנשטרן), and others.

He also starred in Kupa Rashit (Checkout), a TV comedy about a supermarket, as the security guard Chibotero.

== Awards and recognition ==
- 1999 - Edith and Israel Pollack Award
- 2009 - Israeli Theater Award lifetime achievement award
- 2000 - Lerner Yiddish Foundation Award .
- 2013 - Tel Aviv City Darling Badge
- 2016 - the National Authority for Yiddish Culture

== Personal life ==
Bodo is a holocaust survivor, he married with three children and has five grandchildren. He is married to his wife and personal manager, Ester, whom he met in Afula.

== See also ==
- Theater of Israel
- Cinema of Israel
