= Israel Police Orchestra =

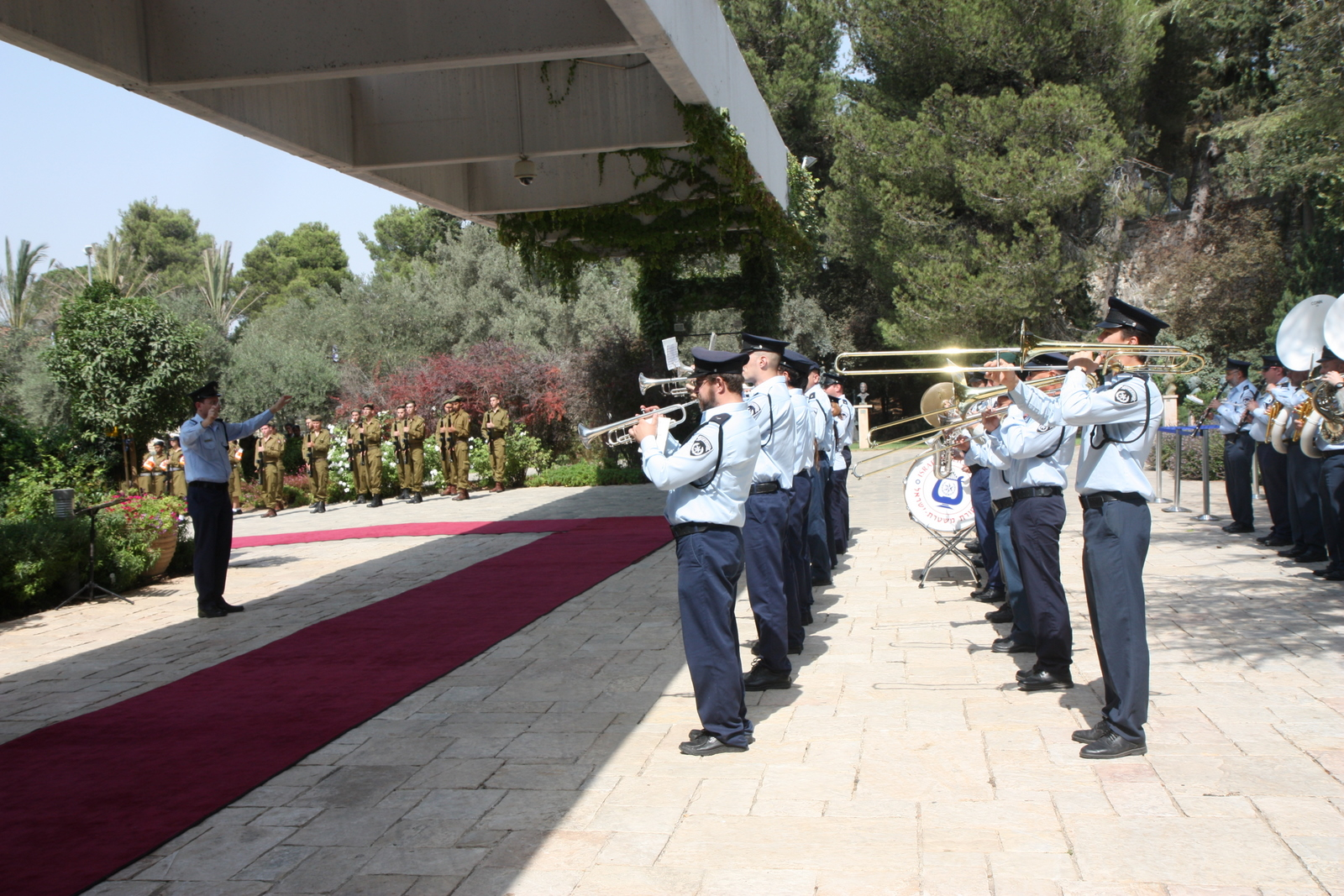
The band in 2010, along with the IDF Orchestra.

The Israel Police Orchestra (Hebrew: תזמורת משטרת ישראל, romanized: Tizmoret Mišteret Yisra'el) is the principal police band of the Israel Police, playing at police ceremonies, as well as official state ceremonies, municipal events and various community events. It is one of the main uniformed marching bands of the country, with the most senior being the Israel Defense Forces Orchestra. Jazz and folk songs are not uncommon genres that are played by the band. Vadim Musnikov is the current conductor.

== History ==
The Police Band was formed soon after the establishment of Israel as a successor to the Palestine Police Band, founded in 1921. Aubrey Silver, a Jewish musician from London, was bandmaster from 1921 until his death in 1944 and was succeeded by Naphtali Grabow from 1944 to 1961. In 1978, the orchestra released a premiere record. Beginning in 1999, soldiers serve alongside regular police officers in the orchestra. Menashe Lev Ran was conductor from 2008. In 2010, the band took part in the Spasskaya Tower Military Music Festival and Tattoo in Moscow.
