= Michael Yaaran =

Israeli military officer and conductor

Lieutenant Colonel Michael Yaaran
- מיכאל יערן; Михаель Яаран
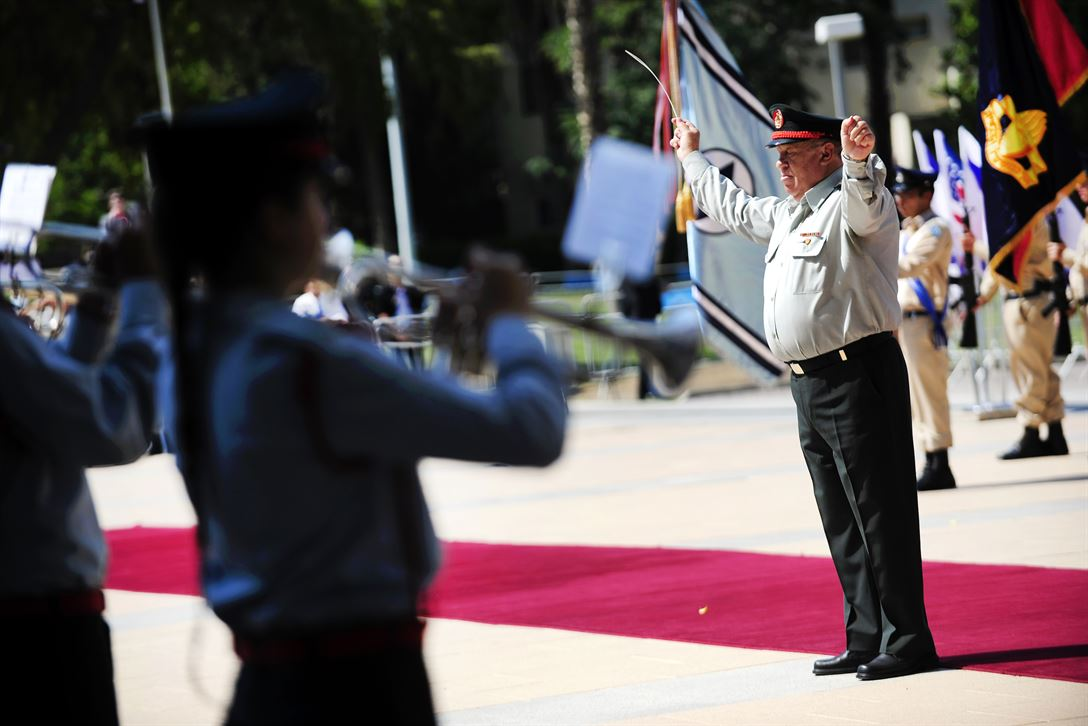
- Yaaran conducting the IDF Band in October 2011
- Born: 7 October 1952 (age 74); Moscow, RSFSR, Soviet Union
- Spouse: Rosie Yaaran
- Military career
- Allegiance: Israel
- Branch: Israel Defense Forces
- Service years: 1976–2013
- Rank: Lieutenant Colonel
- Commands: Israel Defense Forces Orchestra; Rishon Orchestra

Michael Yaaran (Hebrew: מיכאל יערן; Russian: Михаель Яаран) also known as Mikhail Obezchikov is an Israeli musician and was the leader of the Israel Defense Forces Orchestra from 2003 to 2013. He is responsible for more than 300 arrangements that are in the band's archives.

== Biography ==
Yaaran was born in Moscow in 1952 and was raised in the city of Bender, Moldovan SSR. He grew up to a Jewish family, who encouraged him to have a musical education. During his childhood, Yaaran began to learn many musical instruments, mainly the accordion. In his youth, he was enlisted in the Soviet Army and served in the Headquarters Band of the Odessa Military District. He received his musical education at the Vernadsky State Conservatory in Kishinev and at the University of Tel Aviv following his move to Israel. Once he moved to Tel Aviv, Yaaran began his military service in the IDF in mid-1970s, eventually joining the IDF Band as one of the assistant conductors. During that time, Yaaran led the band during the state visits of many leaders to Tel Aviv, including American Presidents Jimmy Carter and Bill Clinton during their visits in 1979 and 1998 respectively. He was appointed as the bandmaster of the IDF Band in 2003, serving for 10 years until his retirement in 2013.

== Personal life ==
He currently lives in Rishon LeZion and is currently married. He also has 2 grandchildren.

== See also ==
- Russian military bands
- Israeli military ensembles
