= Litai (surname) =

Litai (Hebrew: ליטאי) is a Hebrew surname literally meaning "of/from Lithuania"

- Dani Litai, Israeli entertainer
- Aharon Litai (1868-1952), Israeli journalist, publicist, and translator
