= Danny Ben-Israel =

Israeli musician (1944–2019)

Danny Ben-Israel דני בן-ישראל
- Born: Danny Royer דני רוייר; April 23, 1944; Haifa, Mandatory Palestine
- Origin: Haifa, Israel.
- Died: March 11, 2019 (aged 74)
- Genres: Israeli pop, Israeli rock, Psychedelic rock
- Years active: 1962-2019
- Labels: CBS, Hed Arzi Music
- Formerly of: Northern Command Band

Danny Ben-Israel (Hebrew: דני בן-ישראל; 1944 – 11 March 2019) was an Israeli musician of the late 1960s and early 1970s, producing psychedelic progressive rock with socially concerned lyrics in Hebrew.

== Early life ==
Danny Ben-Israel was born in Haifa in 1944 and started his musical career in the Northern Command Band alongside future pop stars Gadi Yagil and Kobi Oshrat. He had a series of pop hits while still in the army.

== Career ==
After leaving the army, he wrote and recorded for films and appeared in several musicals. He toured Europe in 1968 and settled briefly in Austria to record the LP Happy Birthday, Rock'n'Roll. He returned to Tel Aviv in early 1969. He hooked up with guitarist Shlomo Mizrahi, leader of power trio Ha'Bama Ha'Hashmalit and recorded 1970's Bullshit 3 1/4, one of the first Israeli psychedelic recordings. The album was harshly criticized by the local media and had little commercial success, but has gained a great reputation amongst collectors, being regarded as a "psychedelic masterpiece".

Other notable albums include The Kathmandu Sessions, recorded soon after Bullshit 3 1/4 for a label that went bankrupt and finally issued decades later.

== Death ==
Ben-Israel died on 11 March 2019, at the age of 75.

== Select discography ==
- Happy Birthday, Rock'n'Roll
- Bullshit 3 1/4, World In Sound RFR 016LP
- The Kathmandu Sessions, Locust LOCUST 047CD
- The Collection
