= Yigal Bashan =

Israeli singer-songwriter (1950–2018)

Yigal Bashan יגאל בשן
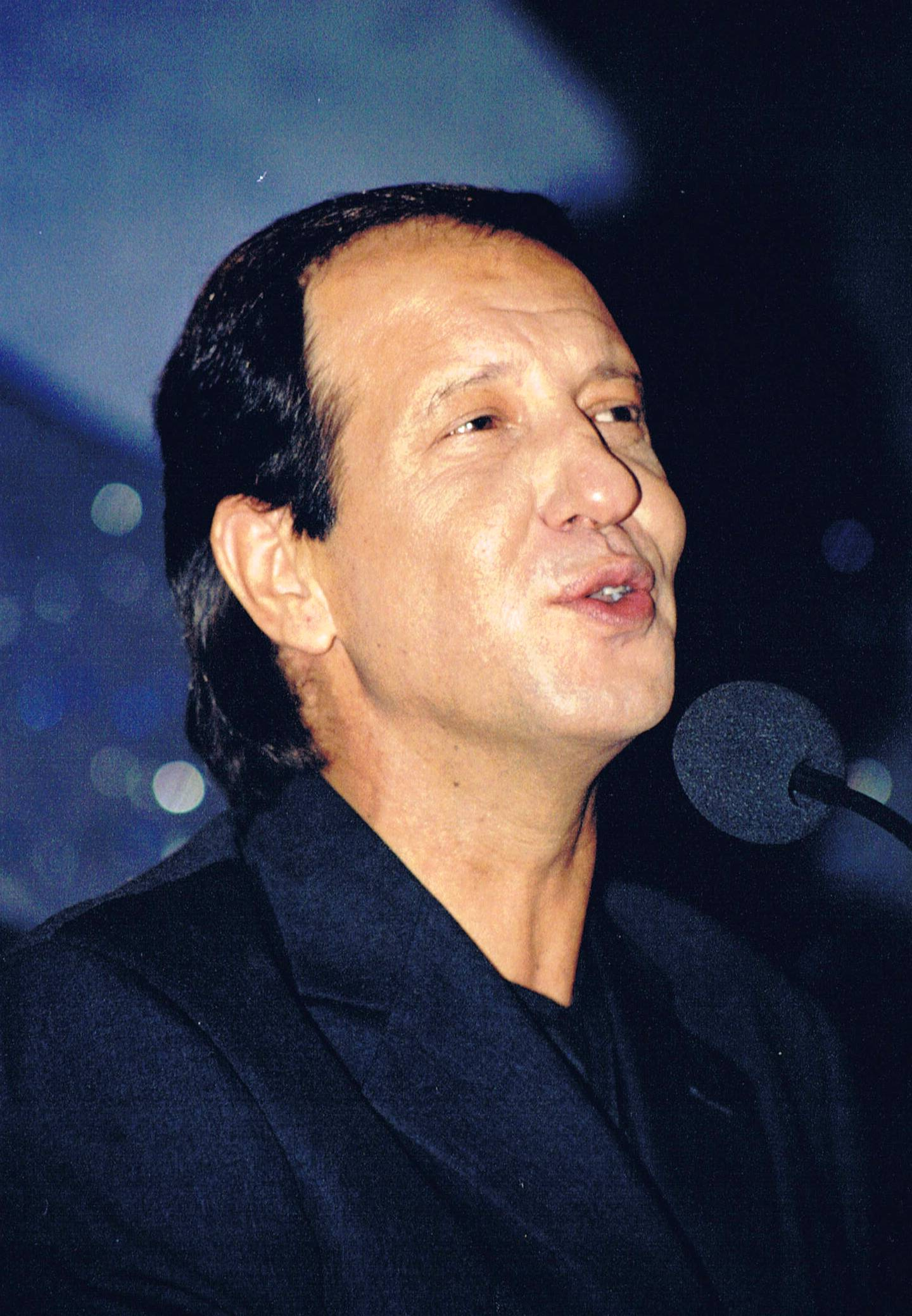

Background information
- Born: Yigal Bashari; 11 September 1950; Rishon LeZion, Israel
- Died: 9 December 2018 (aged 68) Tel Aviv, Israel
- Genres: Pop; rock; children's
- Occupations: Singer-songwriter; actor
- Years active: 1965-2018
- Formerly of: Northern Command Band; Kmo Tzoani; Hopa Hey
- Award: Kinor David
- Website: www.yigalbashan.com

Yigal Bashan (Hebrew: יגאל בשן; 11 September 1950 – 9 December 2018) was an Israeli singer-songwriter, and actor. He was awarded the ACUM Prize for Life Achievement in 2016.

== Early life ==
Born Yigal Bashari (יגאל בשארי) in Rishon LeZion, Israel, to a family of Mizrahi Jewish (Yemenite-Jewish) descent.

== Music career ==
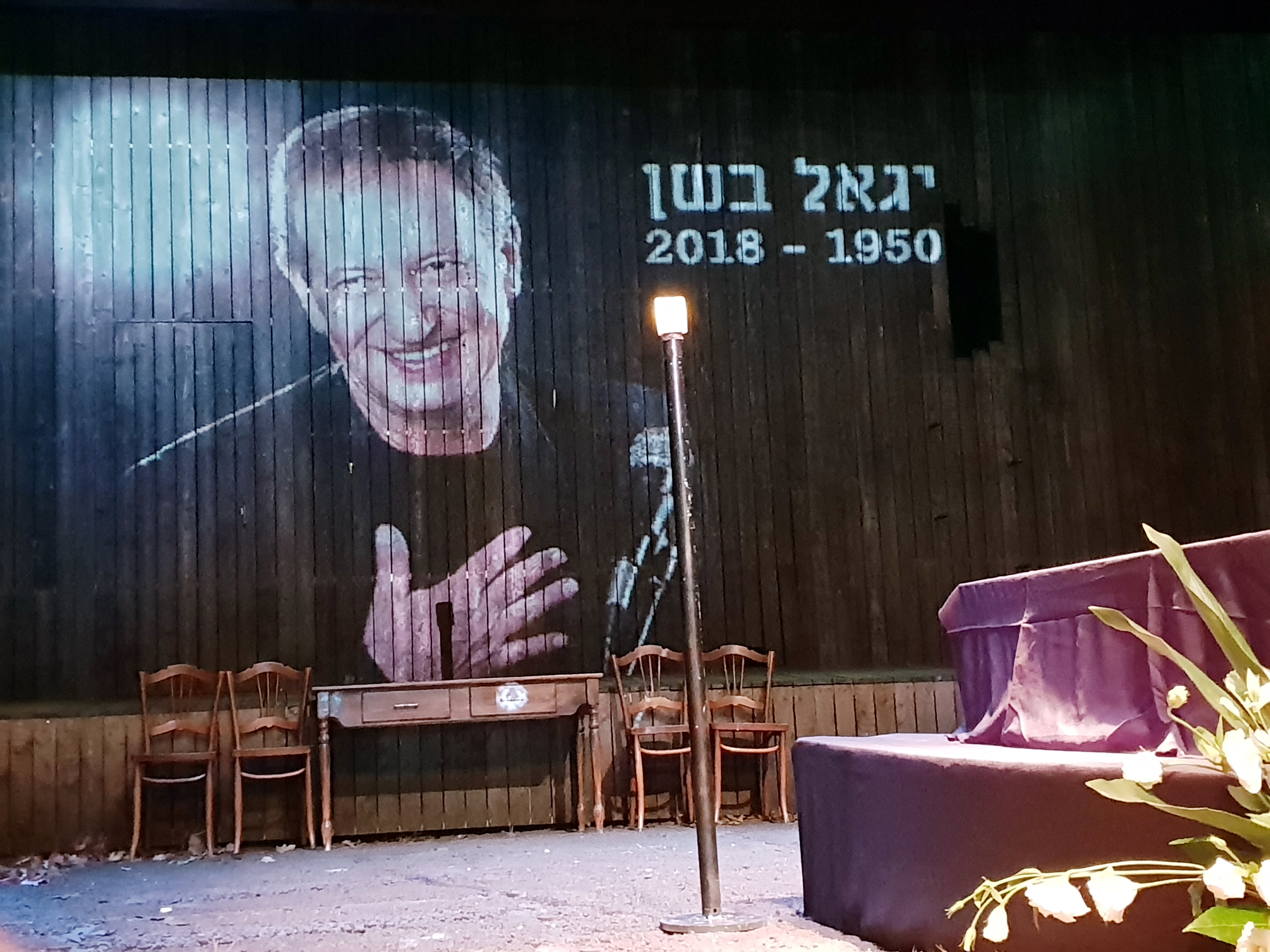
Yigal Bashan's coffin at his funeral

Yigal Bashari began his career by forming a successful duo with Shlomit Aharon. While still a teenager, Bashari starred in the 1968 musical I Like Mike, where acting upon the advice of Moti Giladi, he would change his surname to Bashan. Later, Bashan won the Kinor David Award in 1969 at the age of 18. Due to his fame, several military ensembles attempted to recruit Bashan, but he ultimately went with the Northern Command Band, serving as their frontman from 1969-1972, and performing on several of the band's most popular songs. After being discharged in 1972, Bashan reignited his solo career and was chosen as the singer of the year by Israeli Army Radio, a title he would win a few more times throughout his career.

Bashan was a member of the pop trio "Kmo Tzoani" (Hebrew: "Like a Gypsy") that appeared on the "Hopa Hey" Israeli children's television show, where he collaborated with Yonathan Miller, Uzi Hitman and Tzipi Shavit. He also sang the opening theme song of the Hebrew dub of The Wonderful Adventures of Nils.

== Death ==
In the last few years of his life, Bashan developed clinical depression after dealing with chronic pain. On 9 December 2018, Bashan committed suicide in his home in Tel Aviv. He was 68 years old. He was later laid to rest at the Kiryat Shaul Cemetery.

== See also ==
- Israeli music
