= Shalom Ronli-Riklis =

Israeli musical artist

Shalom Ronli-Riklis שלום רונלי-ריקליס
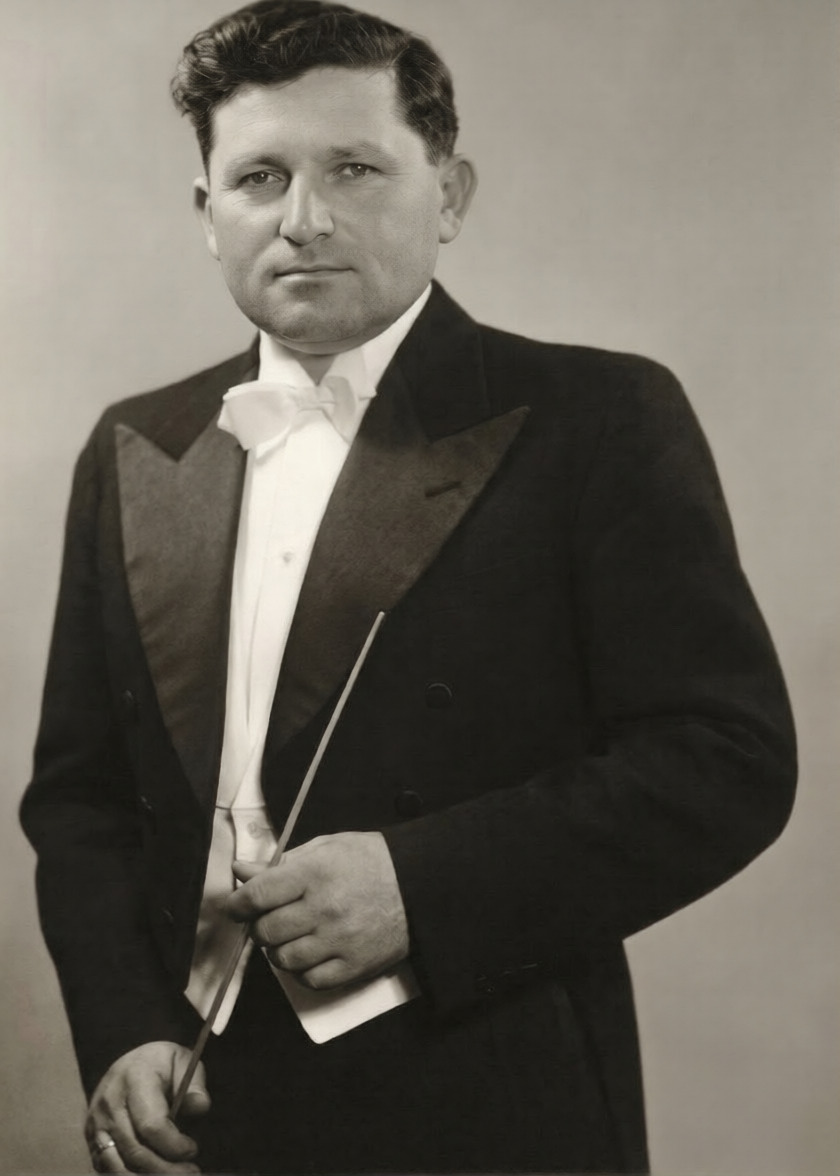

Background information
- Born: 24 January 1922; Tel Aviv, Mandatory Palestine
- Died: 27 January 1994 (aged 72) Tel Aviv, Israel
- Occupation: Conductor
- Instruments: French horn, trumpet

Shalom Ronli-Riklis (Hebrew: שלום רונלי-ריקליס; 24 January 1922 – 27 January 1994) was an Israeli musician, music teacher, and the conductor of the IDF Orchestra.

== Biography ==
Shalom Ronli-Riklis was born in 1922 in Tel Aviv. As a young man, Riklis learned to play the violin and the piano. His piano teacher Vincze-Kraus taught at the Rubin Academy of Music in Tel Aviv University. During his studies at the Hebrew Gymnasium "Herzliya," he learned to play the trumpet and later, the French horn, which would become his main instrument.

After graduation, he joined the British Army and served in the Jewish Brigade during World War II. Following a period of service in the infantry, Riklis joined the brigade's orchestra. Shortly before the end of his service, he was appointed the orchestra conductor. After his discharge from the British Army, Riklis graduated from the Academy of Music in piano and conducting. There he took courses under Igor Markevitch at the Mozarteum University of Salzburg from 1953–56.

=== His IDF service ===
Riklis served in the War of Independence, as a member of the first unit of the military police. In 1949 he was invited to conduct the Israel Defense Forces, IDF, orchestra that had been founded shortly beforehand. He served as conductor of the IDF orchestra for 11 years, until stepping down in 1960.

During that time, Riklis significantly improved the quality of the IDF brass band. This was the first full brass band in Israel. Under his leadership, it became a prominent musical ensemble in Israel. Many of its members in the brass and percussion sections were among the first Israelis to join the Israel Philharmonic orchestra. IDF at the time was the only army in the world who had two orchestras: the symphonic orchestra, founded by Riklis, and a wind ensemble. The symphonic orchestra toured the country, while the wind ensemble played military parades, light music, and Jazz.

His great love was working with teenagers. During his tenure with the IDF Orchestra, he developed the Youth Corps as its conductor. The youth ensemble would go on to win first prize, which was a silver harp, at the Queen Juliana competition for orchestras in Kerkrade, Netherlands, which was attended by over 100 bands. The youth ensemble won three times in a row: 1958, 1962 and in 1966. After three consecutive first prizes, the harp remained permanently in Israel and has been stored in the IDF archives. This band toured in 1967 under his Riklis' baton in the United States and Canada with American star Danny Kaye. They were met with great success.

=== After his army service ===
After leaving the army, he worked for many years at the Israel Radio Orchestra in Jerusalem. Riklis headed the faculty and conducted the Chamber Orchestra of the Academy of Music in Tel Aviv University. He is credited with teaching many generations of musicians in Israel.

In 1961, he was sent by the Singapore Foreign Ministry to build and consolidate the country's classical music. As part of this work he established a symphony orchestra and worked with various youth orchestras.

In 1971, he was appointed deputy of the Israel Philharmonic Orchestra by Zubin Mehta, and in 1984, he founded the Young Israel Philharmonic Orchestra; he remained as its director until 1988. Dozens of his students went on to perform with various orchestras worldwide. Riklis conducted many orchestras in Israel. He also served as a mentor to various musicals and judged numerous music competitions.

Riklis died in January 1994 in Tel Aviv, after a long illness. He is buried in the Yarkon Cemetery.
