= Raz Yirmiya =

Israeli behavioral neuroscientist

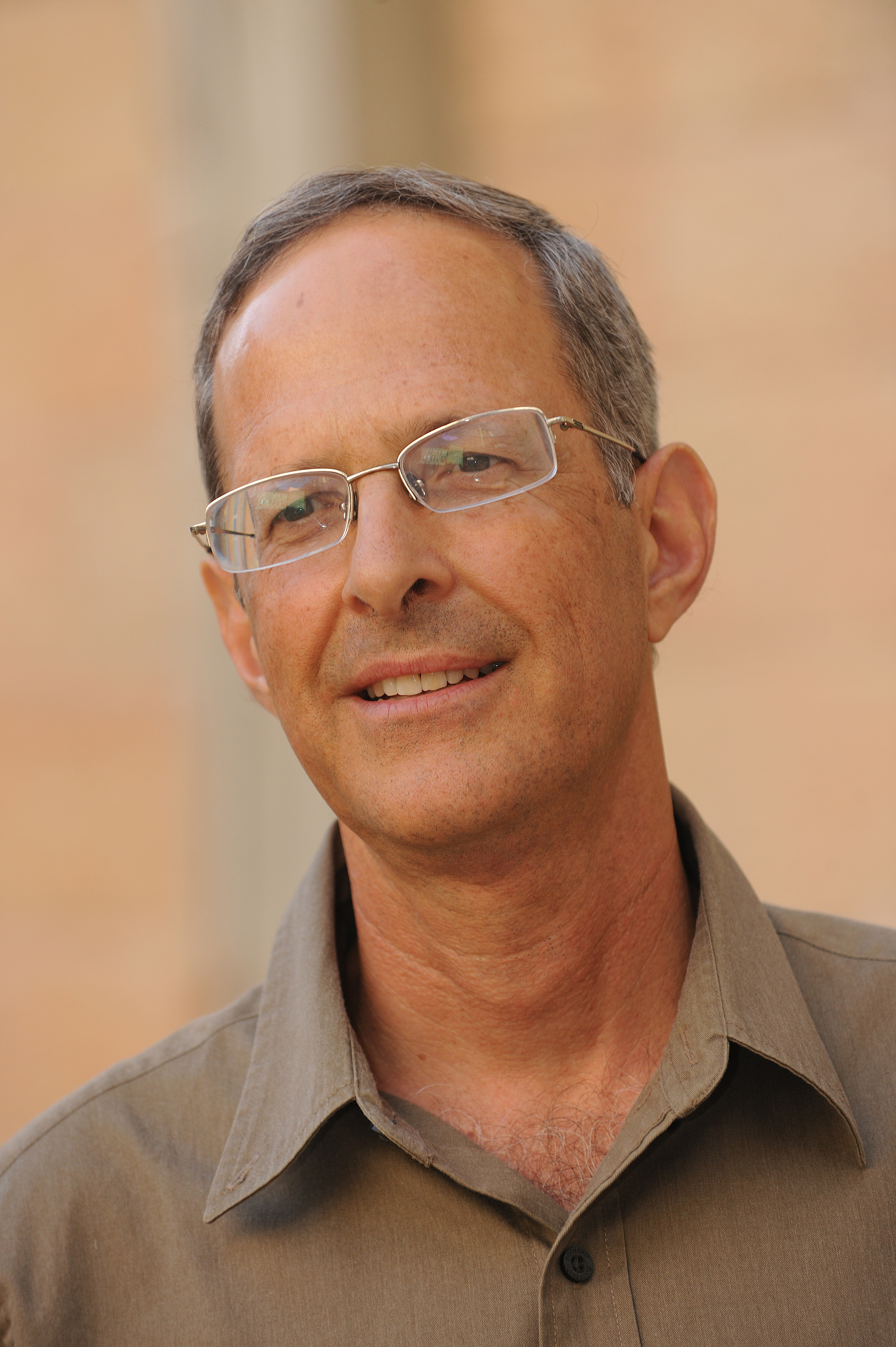
Raz Yirmiya

Raz Yirmiya (Hebrew: רז ירמיה; born 1956) is an Israeli behavioral neuroscientist and director of the Laboratory for Psychoneuroimmunology at the Hebrew University of Jerusalem in Israel. He is best known for providing the first experimental evidence for the role of immune system activation in depression, for discovering that disturbances in brain microglia cells underlie some forms of depression, and for elucidating the involvement of inflammatory cytokines in regulation of cognitive and emotional processes.

== Biography and academic education ==
Raz Yirmiya was born in Rehovot, Israel, and grew up in the northern Israeli beach town Nahariya. Following high-school graduation he joined the Israel Defense Forces, and served as an officer in the Education Corps. Raz Yirmiya obtained a bachelor's degree in Psychobiology from Haifa University and M.Sc. in Physiology from the Technion – Israel Institute of Technology. He did his Ph.D. in Neuroscience under the supervision of Prof. John C. Liebeskind at the University of California, Los Angeles, US. After a 2-year post-doctoral fellowship at the Cousins Center for Psychoneuroimmunology at UCLA he returned in 1990 to an academic position in the Department of Psychology at the Hebrew University of Jerusalem, in which he was appointed to a full Professor in 2003. Raz Yirmiya is married to Professor Nurit Yirmiya and they have 4 children.

== Scientific career ==
In his initial studies during the early 1990s Yirmiya demonstrated that psychoactive drugs, particularly alcohol and opiates, modulate immune functioning and resistance to cancer via brain-to-immune communication pathways. After establishing his laboratory in Jerusalem, Yirmiya focused on the implications of immune-to-brain signaling and using animal models of various infectious, autoimmune and neurological diseases he established the relationships between brain inflammatory cytokines and sickness behavior symptoms. He is specifically known for providing the first experimental evidence for a relationship between immune activation and major depression. His contribution was described in a historical review by Robert Dantzer and Keith Kelly, Who stated: "Raz Yirmiya was the first psychobiologist to draw the analogy between sickness behavior and depression. He showed that rats treated with cytokines are less sensitive to the rewarding properties of a saccharin solution or to the presentation of a sexually-active partner. Some of these deficits can be prevented by chronic but not acute administration of antidepressant drugs that have little or no beneficial effects on sickness behavior." In parallel studies, Yirmiya employed unique controlled and prospective experimental models of disease in humans, demonstrating that immune challenges, such as endotoxin administration, rubella vaccination or minor surgery, induce cytokine-mediated disturbances in behavioral, emotional and cognitive functions. Together, these studies directly contributed to the formation of novel conceptualizations and the development of clinically effective treatments for inflammation-associated major depression.

In recent years, Yirmiya discovered that microglia cells and pro-inflammatory cytokines in the brain play a critical role in normal neuro-behavioral processes, including hippocampal-dependent memory consolidation, neural plasticity, neurogenesis, and the modulation of these processes by environmental enrichment.

On the other hand, disturbances in the structure and functioning of microglia cells and pathophysiological levels of the inflammatory cytokine interleukin-1 in the brain underlie the impairments in cognition and neurogenesis associated with stress. and neurodegenerative diseases, as well as the development of depression.

Yirmiya also discovered (together with Itai Bab from the Hebrew University of Jerusalem), the existence of brain-to-bone communication pathways, mediated by the sympathetic and Parasympathetic nervous system, and reported that chronic stress-induced depression produces bone loss via modulation of these pathways, forming the foundations of a new field of research that we termed "NeuroPsychoOsteology". Raz Yirmiya is a past-president of the Psychoneuroimmunology Research Society (PNIRS)

He was an Associate Editor of Brain, Behavior, and Immunity (Elsevier Press) and a recipient of the Norman Cousins Award for outstanding contributions to research in psychoneuroimmunology.
