= Shlomo Gronich =

Israeli musical artist

Shlomo Gronich שלמה גרוניך
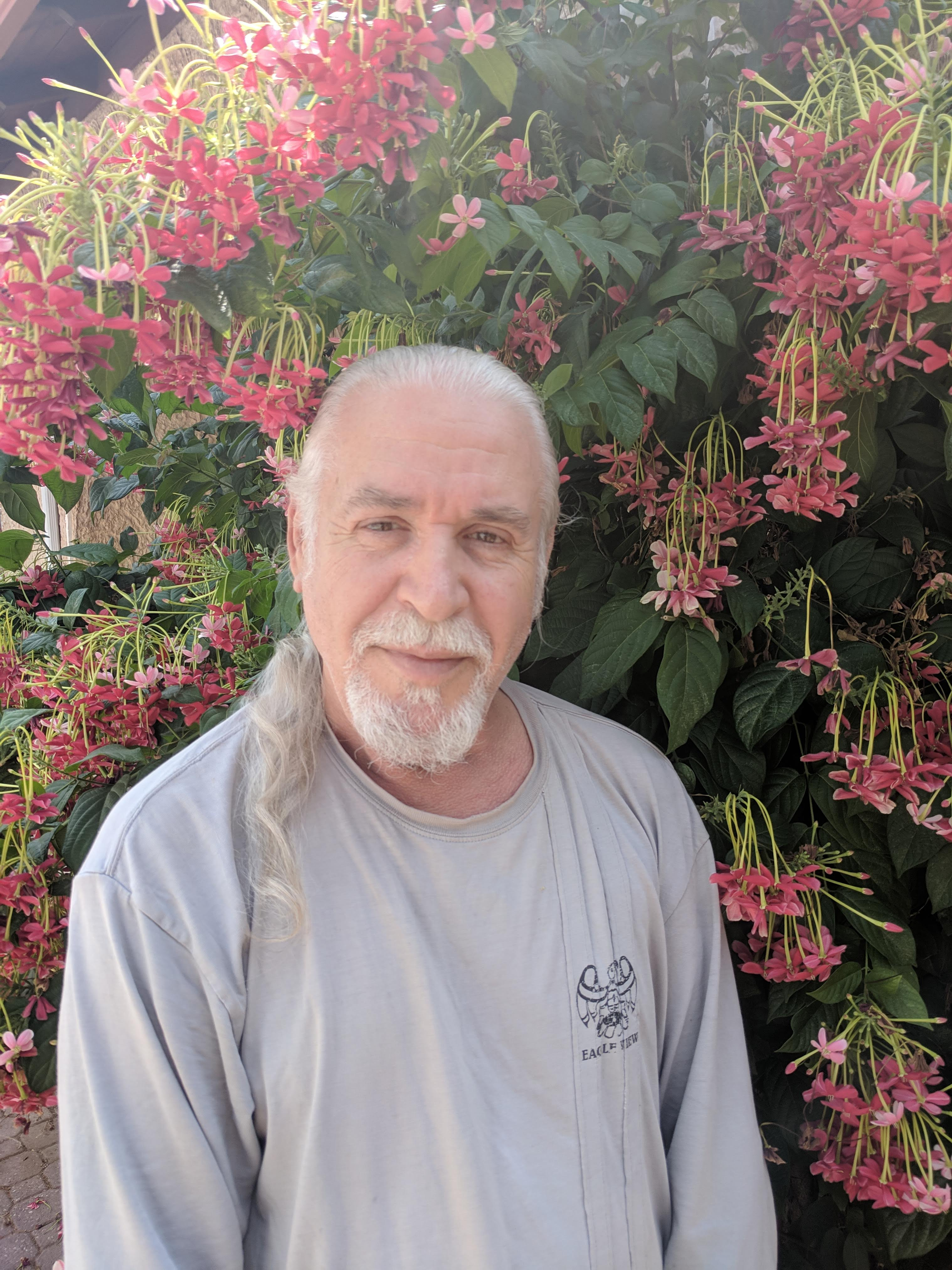
- Shlomo Gronich, 2019

Background information
- Born: January 20, 1949 (age 77); Hadera, Israel
- Genres: Progressive rock, world music, israeli rock
- Occupations: Singer, songwriter, pianist, composer, arranger, bandleader
- Instruments: Singing, piano, accordion, darbouka
- Years active: 1969–present
- Formerly of: Behind the Sounds
- Website: shlomogronich.com

Shlomo Gronich (Hebrew: שלמה גרוניך; born January 20, 1949) is an Israeli composer, singer, songwriter, arranger, and choir conductor.

== Biography ==
Shlomo Gronich grew up in a musical family in Hadera. He holds a B.A. in Music Education from Tel Aviv Educational Academy, and a B.A. in Composition from the Mannes School of Music, New York City.

He was married to Michal Adler, a harmonica player. His composition "HarmoniCadence" is played frequently at harmonica clubs in Taiwan.

== Compositions and arrangements ==
Gronich composes and performs Israeli pop, folk and rock songs in a blend of music genres, including Shirei Eretz Yisrael (the archtypical Israeli music style between 1940 and 1980), Israeli progressive rock with influences of rhythm and blues, jazz, ethnic, Mizrahi music, klezmer music and Middle-Eastern.

== Discography ==
Gronich has released more than 15 albums, including:

- Why Didn't You Tell Me?! (1971, remastered in 2003)
- Behind the Sounds (With Matti Caspi, 1972/1973, remastered in 2002)
- Concert LIVE (1979)
- Cotton Candy (1981, remastered in 2004)
- Behind the Sounds 1984 (With Matti Caspi, 1984)
- Moonlight Walker (1988)
- Neto LIVE (1991)
- Shlomo Gronich & The Sheba Choir (1993)
- Behind the Sounds 2002 (With Matti Caspi, 2002)
- On the Way to the Light (2003)
- Journey to the Source (2008)
- After all (2013)
- Thank you love (2025)

== Music for film ==
He has composed music for film, writing more than 15 film scores, including:

- Thousand Small Kisses – First Prize Cognac film festival, Musical Score, Israeli Oscar for musical score (1981)
- Beyond the Sea – Israeli Oscar for musical score (1991)
- Circus Palestine – Israeli Oscar for musical score (1998)

== Music for theatre ==
He has composed music for more than 20 theatre shows, including –

- America – a musical, performed at the Kennedy Center, Washington DC (1976)
- America (revised version) – performed in Santa Fe Festival, New Mexico (1983)
- The Dream Pilot – a musical performed in Tokyo, Japan (1991)
- The Golem – a musical performed in Prague, Czech Republic (2002)

== Music for ballet ==
Gronich has also written music for ballet. His dance pieces include –

- Song of Songs – Inbal Dance Theater, David's Violin Prize (1983)
- Looking for Jerusalem – Batsheva Dance Company, opening production, Israel Festival (1986)

== Classical music ==
Gronich composed more than a hundred classical compositions, many of which were performed by the world's most notable orchestras including the Berlin Philharmonic.

== Notable performances ==
- Appeared with Astor Piazzolla and the Israeli Philharmonic Orchestra (1986)
- Appeared with the Sheba and Moran Choir at the signing of the Jordan-Israel Peace Agreement (1994)
- Appeared with the Sheba and the Harlem Boys Choir at the Israel Festival (2000)

== Notable prizes ==
- 2001 Hadassah Award, for his work with the Sheba Choir
- 2024 Arik Einstein Prize for artists

== Jewish-Palestinian collaboration ==
Gronich composed and arranged a unique Israeli-Palestinian peace and coexistence song, called in Hebrew Hevenu Shalom Aleinu (We brought peace upon us) and in Arabic Ma'na Ajmal Min Salam (There is nothing more beautiful than peace). He gathered together a group of Jewish-Israeli and Palestinian singers and musicians to perform a Middle-Eastern-style song, with a melody that combines Israeli rock, Arab pop, and Mizrahi musical elements (see #External links). The song was commissioned by the organization Peace Child Israel and adopted as its anthem. The lyrics alternate between Hebrew and Arabic, culminating in the refrain which is sung simultaneously both in Hebrew and Arabic. In the arrangement of the song, Gronich included the oud and the shofar. In July 2011, the song won Third Prize in the global Call for Music Videos of Palestinian-Jewish Duos or Groups presented by the Jewish-Palestinian Living Room Dialogue.

== Controversies ==
=== Sexual harassment allegations ===
In 2017, shortly before Gronich was to receive the Prize for Jewish Culture for lifetime achievement from Israel's Ministry of Education, a 25-year-old woman publicly accused him of sexually harassing her and claimed he had done so to other women in a Facebook post, urging minister Naftali Bennett not to award him the prize. The statute of limitations was already in effect by then. His friend, poet Meir Wieseltier, dismissed them as payback for Gronich insulting her singing aspirations and abilities. Following the accusation, another woman came forward and accused Gronich of attempted rape. The prize was ultimately awarded to Gronich, but he was absent from the ceremony, and his wife accepted it on his behalf.

=== Racist remark ===
On April 19, 2022, while appearing at a music festival in Ein Gev, Gronich praised the audience for being cooperative “Ashkenazim” rather than chakhchakhim, a term similar to arsim but with stronger ethnic implications. He was chided for it at that very event, and later came onstage to apologize for what he claimed was a joke. Still, the remark received many disdainful reactions, from politicians and fellow performers, and his family explained it was the result of early stages of dementia.
