= Dani Litai =

Israeli director and lyricist (1940–2013)

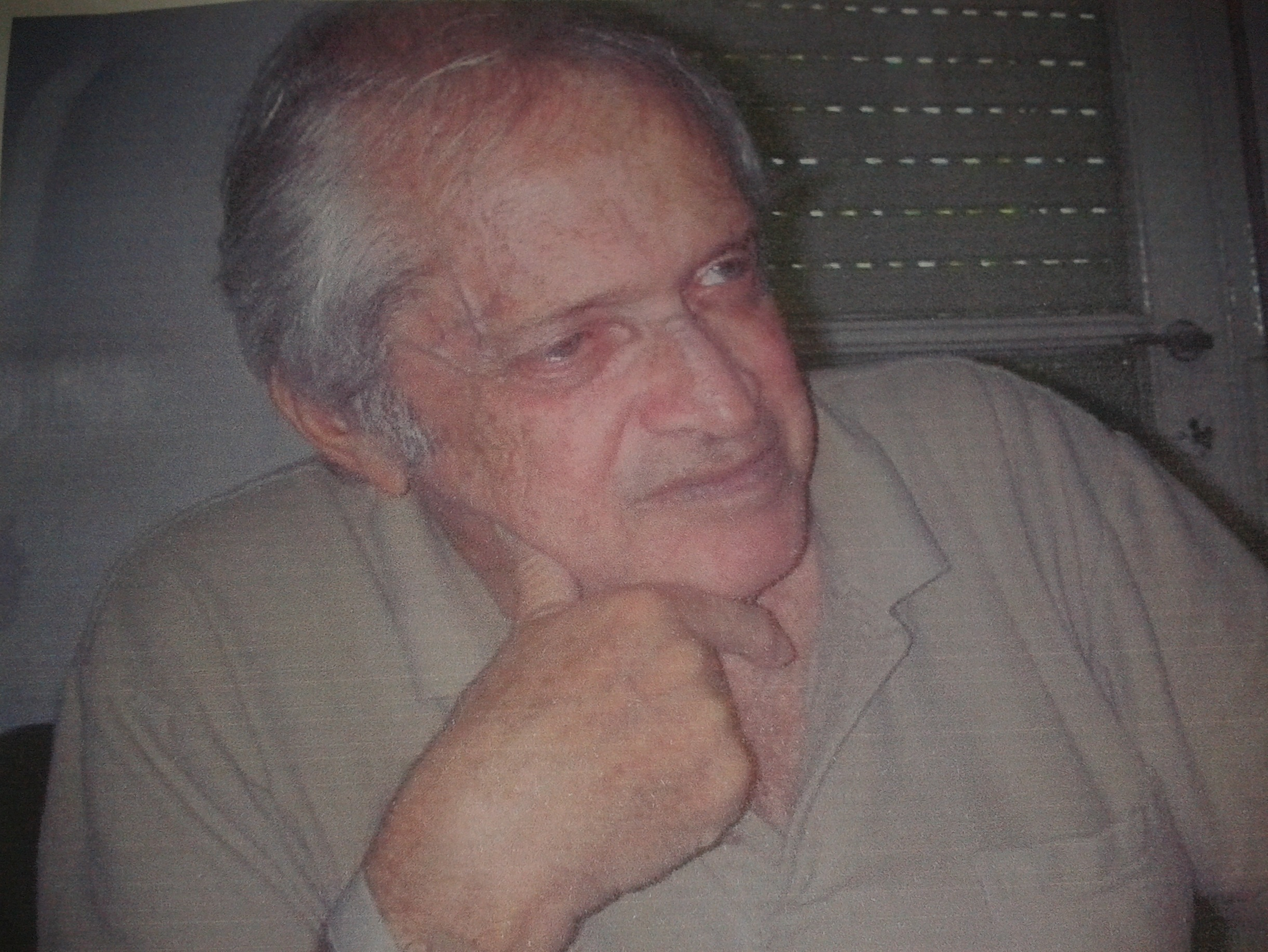
Dani Litai

Dani Litai (Hebrew: דני ליטאי; 4 July 1940 – November 9, 2013) was an Israeli entertainment manager, as well as a singer and songwriter in his early career. He worked with and directed several Israeli military ensembles. He is recognized as a prominent figure in the Israeli entertainment industry. Under his guidance a number of Israeli entertainers launched their careers.
