= Matti Caspi =

Israeli composer, musician and arranger (1949–2026)

Matti Caspi מתי כספי
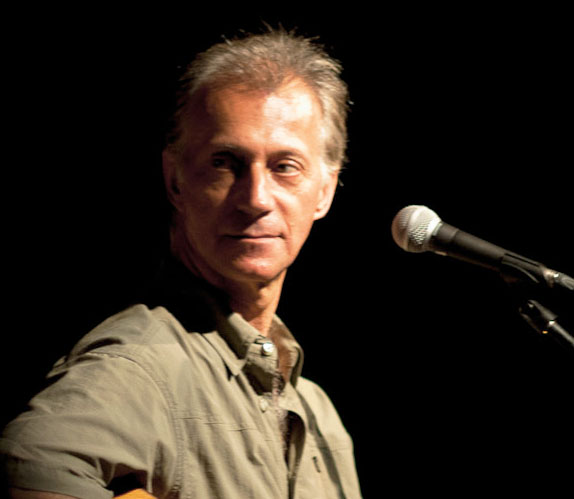

Background information
- Born: 30 November 1949; Kibbutz Hanita, Israel
- Died: 7 February 2026 (aged 76) Tel Aviv, Israel
- Genres: Progressive; avant-garde; progressive pop; art rock; Brazilian; jazz
- Occupations: Singer-songwriter; composer; arranger
- Instruments: Voice; piano; guitar; bass guitar; drums
- Years active: 1967–2025
- Label: NMC Music
- Formerly of: Southern Command Band; They Don't Care; Behind the Sounds
- Website: www.matticaspi.co.il

Matti Caspi (Hebrew: מתי כספי; 30 November 1949 – 7 February 2026) was an Israeli composer, musician, singer, arranger and lyricist. He has been hailed as one of Israel's most beloved and prolific musicians.

His music was influenced by classical music, Brazilian and Latin music, jazz, rock, and other genres. Among the composers who inspired him most, he cited Sasha Argov, with whom he recorded two albums.

== Music career ==
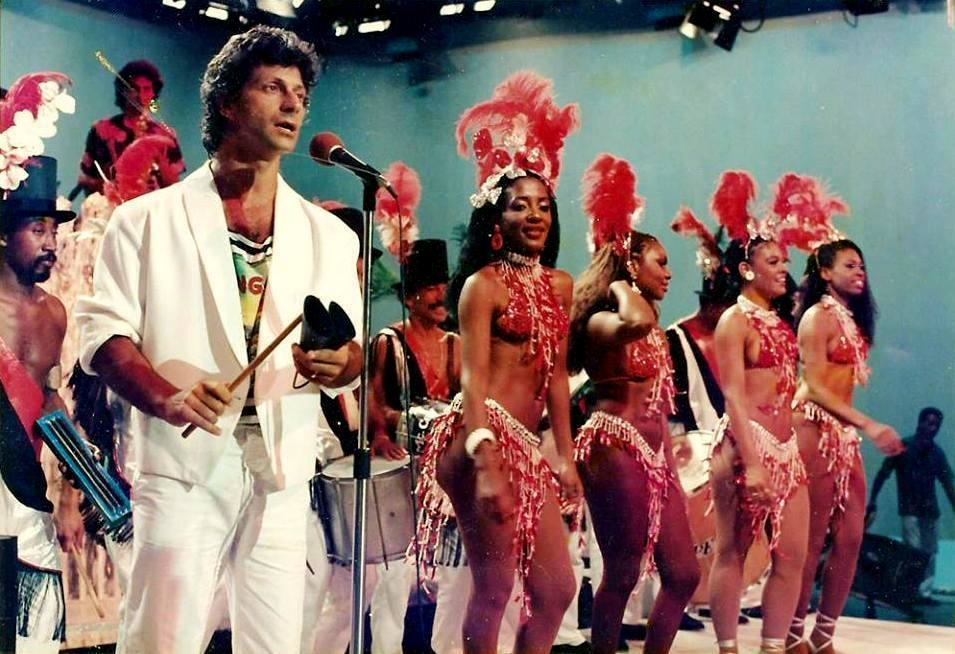
Caspi performing on stage for his musical theatre program "País Tropical"

As a child, Caspi developed an interest in music after listening to Shmuel Gogol play the harmonica. He begged his parents for piano lessons, which had to be approved by the kibbutz. His first public appearance was at the age of 16, performing on Kol Yisrael's Teshu'ot Rishonot, a talent show for teenagers. He recorded a song, "Leiẓan Kippurim", the following year.

For his mandatory service in the Israel Defense Forces, he performed with the Southern Command Band. He formed a trio with two of his friends, Gadi Oron and Ya'akov Noy, called The Three Fatsoes. With this trio Caspi came out with his first big hit, "Ani Met" (I'm dying).

After Caspi's military service, The Three Fatsoes was renamed the They Don't Care trio. In the Yom Kippur War, he toured army bases along with Leonard Cohen, who arranged his 1974 song "Lover Lover Lover" with Caspi. During the 1970s he worked closely with Ehud Manor, another Israeli songwriter, and released some of his most popular songs: "Lo Yadati SheTelchi Mimeni" (I Didn't Know You Would Leave Me), "Brit Olam" (Covenant of Love), and "Shir HaYonah" ( Song of the Dove).

Over the next few decades, Caspi released dozens of records and collaborated with some of the most well-known Israeli artists of the time: Shlomo Gronich, Ehud Manor, Yehudit Ravitz, and Shalom Hanoch, among others. His last album, Like in a Dance, came out in 2017.

Caspi released close to 1,000 songs, both remakes of older songs and original creations. Musicologist Tsippi Fleischer said:

"He is the genius among his fellow artists, he set an important milestone in the history of the music of the world. Caspi has invented his own new musical language. As I sit and analyze his harmonies I find myself amazed all over again each time. The fact that he functions as the performer, arranger and conductor has formed a certain reservedness and introversion, but the truth is that he is a musical wild man. He is the one who promoted sophistication and western standards to the region."

He wrote lyrics for other Israeli artists and in some cases even worked as a producer, as he did for Riki Gal in 1996, both writing the songs and producing her album Ohevet otcha yoter (I Love You More). At the 1976 Eurovision Song Contest, he also served as a conductor, leading the Netherlands' Metropole Orkest in his composition "Emor Shalom", performed by Chocolate, Menta, Mastik, which he also arranged.

== Personal life ==
Matityahu (Matti) Caspi was born in Kibbutz Hanita, Israel on 30 November 1949, and was of Romanian-Bessarabian ancestry. He studied piano at the conservatory in Nahariya.

After his military service, he married Galia Superstein, whom he divorced in less than a year. In 1975 he married actress (Patty) Doreen Lubetzky and had two children, Brit (born 1981) and Bar (born 1985).

In 1990, Caspi separated from his wife after a long time matrimony crisis and after he found out she committed adultery with a married man by the name of Alex Engelhardt. He met Raquel Wenger. The couple emigrated to Canada and married in California in 1994. They had two children, Suyan (born 1992) and Sean (born 1995). Caspi was granted a divorce by the Beverly Hills Rabbinical Court. In 1997, Caspi returned to Israel and appeared in several concerts, including the Arad Festival. פרסום הרשעה שנמחקה (או רישום פלילי שהתיישן) מהווה עבירה פלילית לפי חוק המרשם הפלילי, ועשוי להיחשב כלשון הרע. העונש על כך יכול לכלול מאסר בפועל (עד חצי שנה או שנה במקרים מסוימים), קנסות גבוהים, וכן תביעות אזרחיות לפיצויים על פגיעה בשם הטוב.

In May 2025, Caspi revealed that he was suffering from cancer and subsequently cancelled all of his future concerts; and in July 2025 he launched a fundraiser to help pay for his medical care.

== Death ==
Caspi died of cancer at Ichilov Hospital in Tel Aviv on 7 February 2026 at the age of 76.

== Discography ==
- They Don't Care (1970)
- Behind the Sounds (1973, with Shlomo Gronich)
- Matti Caspi – the First Solo Album (1974)
- Matti Caspi – the Second Solo Album (1976)
- Side A Side B (1978)
- Another Side (1980)
- Twilight (1981)
- Behind the Sounds 1984 (1984, with Shlomo Gronich)
- My Second Childhood (1984)
- Side C Side D (1987)
- Crazy País Tropical (1987)
- One to One (1988)
- Matti Caspi sings Sasha Argov / Mattityahu and Alexander (1990)
- Songs in Tomato Sauce (1990)
- The First Time A Caspi / They Don't Care Collection (1992)
- Buba Matti (1992)
- Matti (1993)
- Matti Caspi and Ehud Manor: the Great Songs (1994)
- Cherished Dreams (1995)
- Live in Arad (1997)
- Another World (1998)
- Media Direct Collection (1999)
- Duets (2000)
- Behind the Sounds 2002 (2002, with Shlomo Gronich)
- Songs of Matti Caspi (2003)
- Ballads (2003)
- The Best (2004)
- You Are My Woman (2005)
- Soul Mate (2010)
- Like in a Dance (2017)
