= Israel Defense Forces Orchestra =

Military band

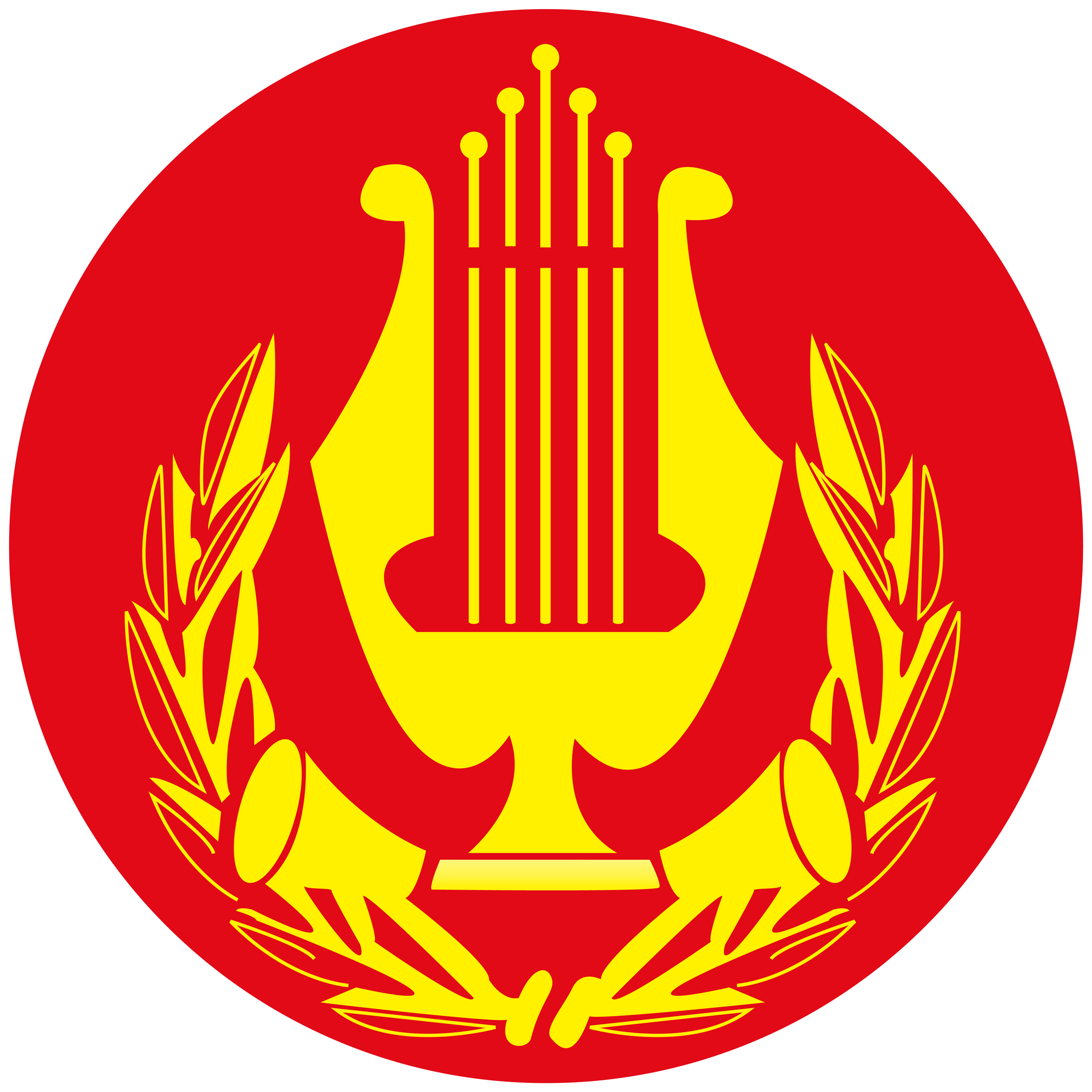
- The Israel Defense Forces Orchestra logo
- Location: Aviv Camp, Ramat Aviv, Tel Aviv
- Founded: 1948
- Director: Rom Shamir
- Members: 20-400
- Website: Orchestra website (Hebrew)

The Israel Defense Forces Orchestra (Hebrew: תזמורת צה"ל, romanized: Tizmoret Tzahal) is the main musical ensemble of the Israel Defense Forces (IDF). It comprises musicians and singers who have passed the auditions before enlistment into the IDF, mostly in compulsory service. It performs at military ceremonies, official visits, and honor guards, as well as various non-official community events.

== History ==
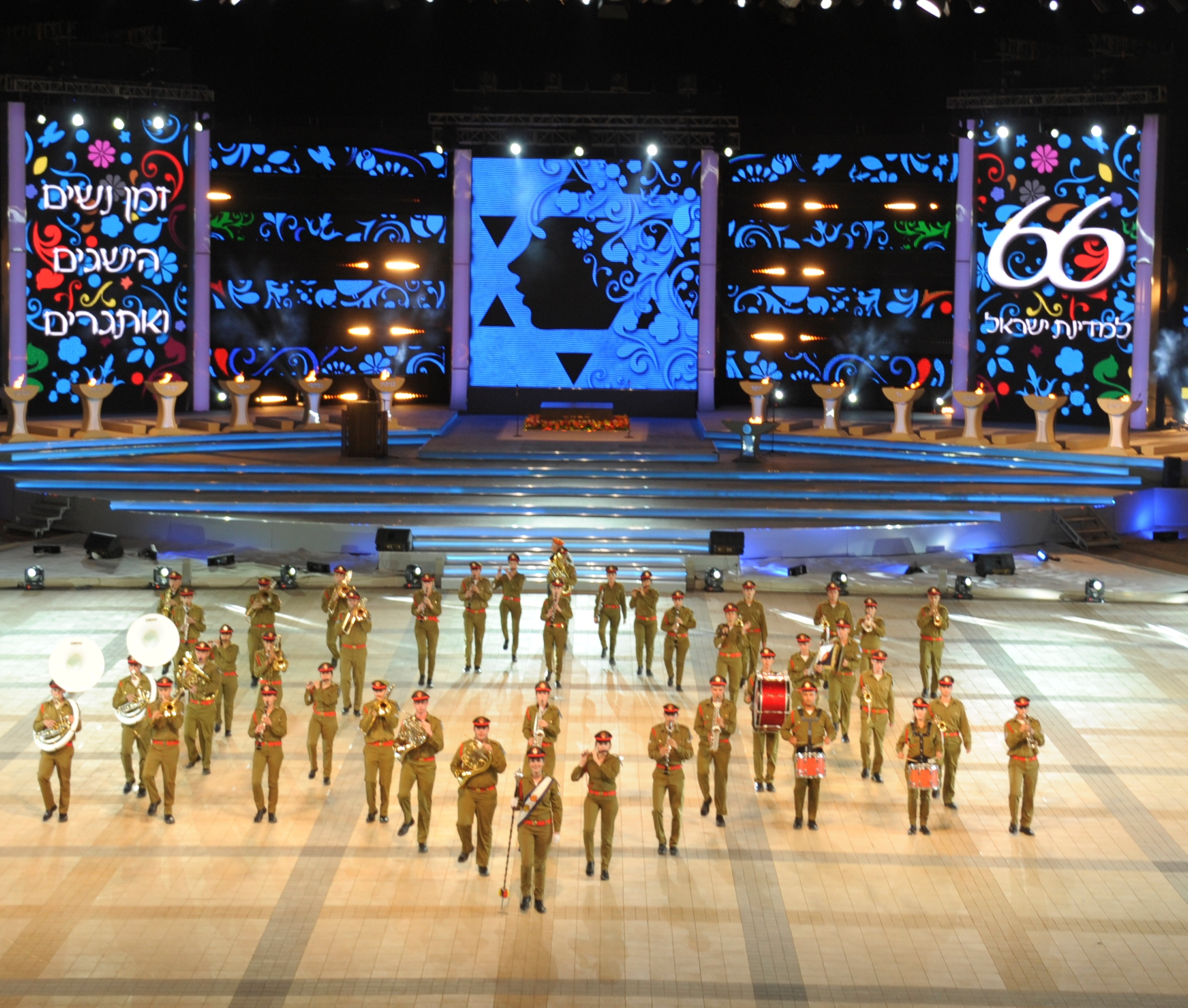
The IDF Orchestra, forming a Star of David

The Israel Defense Forces Orchestra was established in 1948 as a part of the newly formed Israel Defense Forces. It was formed out of four orchestras: The Alexandria Division Band, The Brigade Band, The Artillery Corps Band and The Givati Brigade Band. The orchestra's first conductor was Izhak Muse, a new immigrant from the Soviet Union who played wind instruments. Muse was a graduate of a prestigious military orchestra academy in Leningrad and immigrated to Israel in January 1949. On 4 May 1949, the band participated in the second annual IDF parade celebrating Independence Day, but the crowd that filled the streets blocked the parade route and forced the parade to stop. The event was later nicknamed "The March That Did Not March" and led to the creation of the first Israeli Commission of Inquiry. After several months, Shalom Ronli-Riklis, the former conductor of The Brigade Orchestra, took over as conductor of the orchestra. Ronli-Riklis greatly expanded the orchestra's repertoire from modern to classical music and light music during his tenure as conductor, a position he held until 1960. From 1953 to 1955, renowned Israeli composer Noam Sheriff served as Ronli-Riklis's assistant. Izhak Graziani, a long-time arranger, composer, and trumpet player in the orchestra, became conductor in 1962. Three months before he died, in 2003, Graziani retired. He was replaced by Lt. Col. Michael Yaaran, who conducted the orchestra until his own retirement in 2013. Major Noam Inbar became the conductor On 29 July 2013 and was succeeded by Rom Shamir on 25 April 2018. In 2018, the band received an honorary doctorate from Bar-Ilan University.

=== List of Israel Defense Forces Orchestra Directors of Music ===
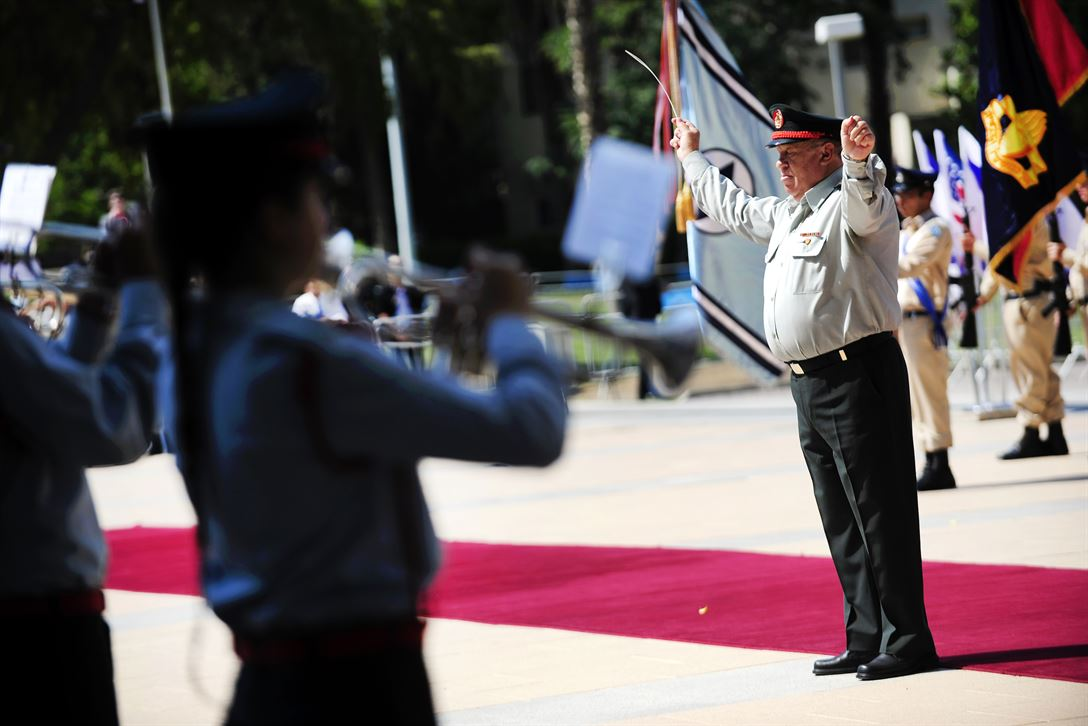
Michael Yaaran in October 2011.

Number	Name	Start of term	End of term
1	Izhak Muse	1948	1949
2	Shalom Ronli-Riklis	1949	1960
3	Izhak Graziani	1962	2003
4	Michael Yaaran	2003	2013
5	Noam Inbar	2013	2018
6	Rom Shamir	2018	Incumbent

== Characteristics ==
The unit is made up of soldiers with musical experience that wish to serve in it. Its base is located in Ramat Aviv, Tel Aviv. In addition to the main orchestra, the IDF has a rabbinical choir and other military bands. The difference between the IDF Orchestra and the other bands (including the choir) is that the other bands are only for entertainment and morale, while the orchestra is also a ceremonial unit. Additionally, while the other military bands belong to the Education and Youth Corps, the IDF Orchestra belongs to the Regime and Discipline Branch—both are under the Manpower Directorate, which is responsible for Israel's state (Note: When the word "state" is used as an adjective in this article (as in "state ceremony"), it refers to formal, official, ceremonial events that are designated as important to the state and its people.) and military ceremonies.

Among the many functions of the orchestra, its main activities are performing at graduation courses in military training bases, official visits by heads of state and military personnel, and official ceremonies (such as the torch-lighting ceremony held each year on Mount Herzl, Jerusalem to celebrate Israel's Independence Day).

The unit's symbol is a harp of David placed between two trumpets amalgamated with olive branches. When the orchestra is not performing, its musicians wear the standard uniform (olive green) with a musician's pin above the left pocket. The ceremonial uniform, worn in official ceremonies, is a standard uniform together with a red belt, a red string (worn over the right shoulder), a ceremonial cap stamped with the band's symbol over a red background, and a larger musician's pin. The IDF Orchestra is the only IDF unit that has two pins identical in design but different in size.

== Activities ==
=== Parades ===
In parades, the orchestra musicians are always on their feet, and in most parades they march across the parade ground. In parades that are not part of state ceremonies, the orchestra is the first military force to enter the parade ground, immediately followed by the other forces. In such parades, most commonly featured in the conclusion of military courses, the band is led by a drum major whose job is to direct the orchestra during the march, signal the turns, and mark the beginning and end of the music.

In most state parades the band does not march, but rather stands with a military honor guard beside a red carpet to welcome the person of honor.

However, some extremely large state parades include marching (e.g. large receptions held at Israel's main international airport).

The instrumentation at such parades comprises: piccolo, oboe, clarinet, saxophone (alto and tenor), bassoon, french horn, trumpet, trombone, baritone horn, sousaphone (marching tuba), snare drum, bass drum, and cymbals.

=== Performances ===
The orchestra also performs in public, not only in Israel but sometimes abroad to perform for events like ceremonies, the arrival of world leaders, etc. These performances include a rich repertoire, comprising classical music for concert bands, popular music, Israeli songs, and marches. The band regularly performs with leading artists of Israeli music. Among others, the orchestra has performed with Yehoram Gaon, Ofra Haza, Ilanit, Yardena Arazi, Harel Skaat, David Broza, Kobi Aflalo, Rami Kleinstein.

Ever since the 2000s, the orchestra performs annually at the Rishon LeZion Festival on Sukkot has become a tradition.

== See also ==
- Orchestra
- Marching band
- Military band
