= Kokhav Nolad 7 =

Season of Israeli reality television competition

- Season 7
- Starring: Zvika Hadar; Margalit Tzan'ani; Tsedi Tzarfati; Svika Pik; Gal Uchovsky; Dana International

Release
- Original network: Keshet
- Original release: May 24 – August 30, 2009

Season chronology
- ← Previous; Kokhav Nolad 6 Next → Kokhav Nolad 8

Kokhav Nolad 7 is season 7 of an Israeli reality television competition Kokhav Nolad aimed at finding new solo singing talent. It debuted on May 24, 2009, and was broadcast twice a week, ending August 30, 2009.

An addition to the new season of the show included transsexual singer and former Eurovision Song Contest winner Dana International, who joined the show as a judge in the panel that includes composer Svika Pik, singer Margalit Tsanani, director and choreographer Tsedi Tsarfati, plus writer and music critic Gal Uchovsky. The show's host as usual was comedian Zvika Hadar.

Auditions were held in Israel in Tel Aviv, Beersheba, and Haifa. While in Kokhav Nolad 6, auditions were also held in India; this time the judges went to find singers in the Americas. The finale was broadcast live from Eilat.

The average age of the seventh season was remarkably low, because many of the contestants had not finished high school when the show aired.

Although the show is mostly dedicated to Israeli and Hebrew music, this year the participants were allowed to sing some songs in Arabic, English, Russian and Spanish.

On August 23, the finalists were announced to be Mei Finegold, Vladi Blayberg and Roni Dalumi. Dalumi won the competition with 61% of the votes.

== Participants ==
Male Participants	Female Participants
Or Kollenberg* (19, Giv'at Shmuel)	Amor Amosi* (23, Even Yehuda)
Liran Danino* (18, Petah Tikva)	Roni Dalumi (17, Omer)
Daniel Tavori* (22, Nes Ziona)	Mazal Picado* (23, Beersheba)
Elchai Refoua* (18, Jerusalem)	Paula Volstein* (31, Brooklyn, New York)
Omer Adam* (15, Mishmar HaShiva)	Moran Mazuz* (26, Netivot)
Hovi "Star" Sekulets* (22, Kiryat Ata)	Aya Zehavi Fayglin* (22, Hadera)
Oshri Elmorish* (21, Maor)	Yarden Geraffi* (18, Karkur)
Daniel Barzilay* (17, Arad)	Mei Finegold (26, Rishon LeZion)
Vladi Blayberg (26, Holon)	Adi Cohen* (27, Masua)
Ido Geraffi* (18, Karkur)
Re'em Cohen* (25, Beersheba)
Sagi Ossi* (17, Tirat Carmel)
Tomer Yishaayahu* (20, Ra'anana)

* – asterisk (*) means eliminated.

== The Episodes and songs performed ==
Below are the episodes.

=== First Solo Week ===
Performances were held on June 28 and June 29, live from Herzliya TV studios, the same venue since the fourth season. 11 participants performed on each day. Judges ranking was 25% of the final result.

==== Sunday, June 28th ====
Performer	Number	Original Performer
Re'em Cohen	"Lihyot zamar" (To be a singer)	Haim Moshe
Roni Dalumi	"Tiftach Chalon" (Open a window)	Rita
Sagi Ossi	"LeSham" (To there)	Miri Mesika
Or Kollenberg	"Ayeka?" (Where are you?)	Shuly Rand
Yarden Geraffi	"Otkha" (You)	Ilana Avital
Moran Mazuz	"Ma lakh yalda?" (What is it with you, Girl?)	Zohar Argov
Elchai Refoua	"Olam" (World)	Offira Yossefi
Aya Zehavi Fayglin	"Kol ehad rotze" (Everybody wants)	Shalom Hanoch
Paula Volstein	"Bo habayta" (Come home)	Rami Kleinstein
Tomer Yishaayahu	"Liknot lakh yahalom" (To buy you a diamond)	Eyal Golan
Liran Danino	"At" (You)	Mosh Ben Ari

Paula aVlstein was awarded the best performance of the night. Yarden Geraffi and Aya Zehavi Fayglin were eliminated.

==== Monday, June 29th ====
Performer	Number	Original Performer
Amor Amosi	"Agada avuda" (A lost legend)	Shlomit Aharon
Hovi "Star" Sekulets	"Cinderella"	Sexta
Mei Finegold	"Ale baruakh" (A Leaf in the wind)	Gabi Shushan
Daniel Tavori	"Ima sheli" (My mother)	Noam Caniel
Adi Cohen	"Ad sheta'azov" (Until you leave)	Rita
Oshri Elmorish	"Ashem" (Guilty)	Synergia
Daniel Barzilay	"Yesh ey sham" (There is somewhere...)	Gidi Gov
Vladi Blayberg	"Adagio"	Shlomit Aharon
Ido Geraffi	"Parparim" (Butterflies)	Uri Banai
Mazal Picado	"Lir'ot et ha'or" (Seeing the light)	Efrat Gosh
Omer Adam	"Isha ne'emana" (A loyal woman)	Yishai Levi

Mei Finegold was awarded the best performance of the night. Ido Geraffi and Adi Cohen were eliminated, but won "Hatsilu, Ani Kokhav Nolad!" (see below) and could come back to the show. Finegold was awarded best weekly performance.

=== Second Solo Week ===
Performances were held on July 5 and July 6 from Herzliya TV studios. 9 participants performed each day. Judges ranking was 25% of the final result.

=== Sunday, July 5th ===
Performer	Number	Original Performer
Omer Adam	"Tza'ir lanetsakh" (Forever young)	Rami Kleinstein
Mei Finegold	"Boogy iti halayla" (Boogy with me tonight)	Gary Eckstein
Elchai Refoua	"Vehi she'amda" (She who stood)	Yaakov Shwekey & Yonatan Razel
Vladi Blayberg	"Le'an shelo telchi" (Wherever you go)	Shiri Maimon
Liran Danino	"Shir yashan" (Old song)	Ethnix
Mazal Picado	"Kotonet pasim" (Stripe nightshirt)	Meir Ariel
Tomer Yishaayahu	"Ir miklat" (Shelter city)	Ehud Banai
Hovi "Star" Sekulets	"Mits'taer" (Sorry)	Michael Kirkilan
Roni Dalumi	"HaKhayim yafim" (Life's beautiful)	Achinoam Nini

Hovi Sekulets was awarded the best performance of the night. During the show, Israel Bar-On, winner of Kokhav Nolad 6, performed. Tomer Yeshayahu was eliminated.

==== Monday, July 6th ====
Performer	Number	Original Performer
Or Kollenberg	"Hayom hayom" (Today today)	Dorit Reuveni
Paula Valstein	"Tir'i, ze ani" (Look, it's me)	Synergia
Daniel Barzilay	"Kol ma shenish'ar" (All that's left)	Boten Matok BaKirkas
Re'em Cohen	"Atur mitzkhekh" (Your forehead is covered)	Arik Einstein
Amor Amosi	"Hakol ze letova" (Everything is for the better)	Dana International
Sagi Ossi	"Kol hakohkavim" (All the stars)	David D'or
Daniel Tavori	"Ahava kena" (Honest love)	Neriya Hovav
Oshri Elmorish	"Titkhaneni elay" (Beg me)	Evyatar Banai
Moran Mazuz	"Keren shemesh me'ukheret" (Late ray of sun)	Shalom Hanoch

Paula Valstein was awarded the best performance of the night for the second week in a row. During the show, Harel Skaat, the runner-up of the 2nd season, performed. Sagi Ossi was eliminated. Hovi was awarded best weekly performance.

=== Third Week ===
July 12 and July 13. Sunday was a duet evening. Judges' ranking of the duets was 40% of the result, after which 6 pairs qualified to Monday's show, and 4 contestants performing "rescue solos", with 25% judges ranking of the final result. One of the four was eliminated.

The pairs for Sunday show were as such:

Performer	Number	Original Performer
Re'em Cohen & Vladi Blayberg	"Ba lashkhuna bakhur khadash" (A new guy came to the neighbourhood)	Alon Olearchik
Moran Mazuz & Omer Adam	"Niguna shel hashkhuna" (The neighborhood's song)	Izhar Cohen
Oshri Elmorish & Amor Amosi	"At shara baradio" (You're singing on the Radio)	Rami Kleinstein
Or Kollnberg & Roni Dalumi	"Tzliley hasheket"	HaParvarim (originally "The Sounds of Silence" by Simon & Garfunkel)
Daniel Barzilay & Mazal Picado	"Boy nagid she'ani shelakh" (Let's say I'm yours)	Alon Olearchik
Elchai Refoua & Hovi "Star" Sekulets	Shavim (Equals)	Ran Danker & Ilay Botner
Daniel Tavori & Mei Finegold	"Achinoam lo yodaat" (Achinoam doesn't know)	Rockfour
Paula Valstein & Liran Danino	"Ad makhar" (Until tomorrow)	Evyatar Banai

Hovi & Elchai Refoua and Omer & Moran awarded the best performance of the night and therefore they are automatically qualified for next week's show. Bottom 2 were Mei Feingold, Daniel Tavori, Oshri Elmorish and Amor Amosi. All 4 sang rescue solos. These were:

Performer	Number	Original Performer
Amor Amosi	"BeSof hayom ani tzrikha otkha" (I need you at the end of the day)	Riki Gal
Mei Finegold	"Nag'a bashamayim" (Touched the sky)	Machina
Daniel Tavori	"I'm yours"	Jason Mraz
Oshri Elmorish	"Ben hamelekh" (Son of the king)	Rami Davidoff

Amor Amosi was eliminated from the show.

==== Monday, July 13th ====
The second night was dedicated to the Israeli writer, lyricist and poet Ehud Manor who died just a few years ago. This night all participants performed with songs Manor was partner in. Out of 11 performances, two participants would be eliminated this show. Judges ranking was 25% of the final result.

Performer	Number	Original Performer
Liran Danino	"Lo yada'ati shetelkhi mimeni" (I didn't know you'd go away from me)	Matti Caspi
Paula Valstein	"Slikha" (Sorry)	Matti Caspi
Oshri Elmorish	"BeSof ha'olam" (In the end of the world)	Ninet Tayeb
Daniel Barzilay	"Inyan shel zman" (A matter of time)	Gidi Gov
Mei Finegold	"Emor shalom" (Say hello)	Chocolate, Menta, Mastik
Re'em Cohen	"Brit olam" (World covenant)	Matti Caspi
Daniel Tavori	"La'uf itakh" (To fly with you)	Ephraim Shamir
Roni Dalumi	"Khalomot shmurim" (Safe dreams)	Izhar Cohen
Or Kollenberg	"Mishehu" (Somebody)	Yehudit Ravitz
Mazal Picado	"Hi shelo vehu shela" (She's his and he's hers)	Riki Gal & Matti Caspi
Vladi Blayberg	"Ein li eretz akheret" (I got no other land)	Corinne Allal

Mazal Picado and Oshri Elmorish were eliminated.

=== Fourth Week ===
Were held on July 19 and July 20. The first night was an unthemed duets night, while the bottom two would go up in the end to do 'rescue solos' where the audience would choose which 1 of the 4 will leave the show. As there are 13 participants in the show, a trio was selected to perform. Judges ranking of the duets was 40% and that of the rescue solos was 25% of the final result.

==== Sunday, July 19th ====
The pairs for Sunday show were as such:

Performer	Number	Original Performer
Re'em Cohen, Hovi Sekulets & Omer Adam	"Ma hu ose la" (What does he do to her)	HaGashash HaHiver
Elchai Refoua & Liran Danino	"Ge'ula"	Hemi Rudner
Vladi Blayberg & Moran Mazuz	"Boy ima" (Come Mom)	Ilanit
Daniel Brazilay & Or Kollenberg	"Luakh vagir" (Chalk and a board)	Shmulik Kraus
Paula Valstein & Daniel Tavori	"Linshom itkha" (To breathe with you)	An original song the pair wrote while searching for an entry.
Mei Finegold & Roni Dalumi	"Femme fatale"	Yuval Banai (Hebrew version to a song originally by Velvet Underground)

Vladi & Moran and Omer, Hovi & Re'em, Mei & Roni and Elchai & Liran qualified for Monday's show. Bottom 2 were Daniel, Or, Paula and Daniel. All 4 sang rescue solos. These were:

Performer	Number	Original Performer
Daniel Barzilay	"At mevi'a hakol lidey dmaot" (You bring everything to tears)	Shalom Hanoch
Or Kollenberg	"Uf gozal" (Fly chick)	Arik Einstein
Daniel Tavori	"Zakhiti le'ehov" (Had the right to love)	Ivri Lider
Paula Valstein	"Kol davar kat" (Every little thing)	Alon Olearczyk

Or Kollenberg was eliminated from the show.

During the show Gidi Gov performed.

==== Monday, July 20th ====
Was a 1980s-themed special. During the show the Pet Shop Boys perform, a day after they landed in Israel. Judges ranking was 25% of the final result. 12 performances were held, in the following order:

Performer	Number	Original Performer
Roni Dalumi	"Matkhila mehatkhala" (Starting anew)	Mango
Hovi Sekulets	"Eved shel hazman" (Time's slave)	Rita
Daniel Barzilay	"Shtey etsba'ot miTsidon" (Two fingers from Sidon)	Boaz Offri
Vladi Blayberg	"Roked lekol habanot" (Dancing to the voice of the girls)	Efraim Shamir
Moran Mazuz	"Ohevet otkha, ozevet otkha" (Loving you, leaving you)	Dafna Armoni
Omer Adam	"Marlene"	Zohar Argov (originally by Enrico Macias)
Elchai Refouah	"Makhar hu yakhazor" (Tomorrow he'll be back)	Danny Robas
Paula Valstein	"Shlakh li mal'akh" (Send me an angel)	Mashina
Daniel Tavori	"Bayom shel haptzatza" (On the bomb's day)	Rami Kleinstein
Re'em Cohen	"Raiah" (Wife)	Avihu Medina
Mei Finegold	"Seder yom" (Daily Schedule)	Lahaka Retorit
Liran Danino	"Lir'ot ota hayom" (Seeing her today)	Tislam

Elchai Refoua was eliminated from the show.

=== Fifth Week ===
Was held on July 26 and July 27. The first week was where all participants performed every night. The first night was an unthemed duets night, while the bottom two went to go up in the end to do 'rescue solos' where the audience would choose which 1 of the 4 will leave the show. As there are 11 participants in the show, a trio was selected to perform. Judges ranking of the duets was 40% and that of the rescue solos was 25% of the final result.

==== Sunday, July 26th ====
The pairs for Sunday show were as such:

Performer	Number	Original Performer
Liran Danino, Daniel Tavori & Daniel Barzily	"Einekh yekhola" (You can't)	The High Windows
Paula Valstein & Roni Dalumi	"Hi" (She)	Originally She by Elvis Costello
Mei Finegold & Hovi Sekulets	"Red me'al masakh hatelevizia sheli" (Get off my TV screen)	Rami Fortis
Re'em Cohen & Moran Mazuz	"Zemer shlosh hatshuvut" (Three answers song)	Rivka Zohar
Omer Adam & Vladi Blayberg	"Yak'had" (Together)	Kobi Peretz & Ishtar

Vladi & Omer, Mei & Hovi and Moran & Re'em qualified for Monday's show. Bottom 2 were Daniel Tavori, Daniel Barzilay, Liran, Paula and Roni. All 5 sang rescue solos. These were:

Performer	Number	Original Performer
Daniel Barzilay	"Arim roshi" (I'll lift my head)	Shay Gabso
Roni Dalumi	"Ba'a elechem" (Coming to you)	Miri Mesika
Liran Danino	"Hi lo doma" (She's not alike)	Arkadi Duchin
Daniel Tavori	"Hipasti shirim latset laolam" (I looked for songs to come out to the world)	Shimi Tavori
Paula Valstein	"My my"	Paula Valstein

Daniel Barzilay was eliminated from the show.

During the show performed Boaz Mauda, winner of the 5th season who released a new album.

==== Monday, July 27th ====
Was an Idan Raichel special. During the show his project performed. Judges ranking was 25% of the final result. 10 performances were held, in the following order:

Performer	Number	Original Performer
Omer Adam	"Mima'amkim" (From The Depths)	Idan Raichel's Project
Re'em Cohen	"Milim yafot me'ele" (More beautiful words than those)	Idan Raichel's Project
Moran Mazuz	"Yesh bi od koa'kh" (I still have strength)	Idan Raichel's Project
Roni Dalumi	"Cada dia" (Everyday)	Idan Raichel's Project
Liran Danino	"Shoshanim atzuvot" (Sad roses)	Idan Raichel's Project
Vladi Blayberg	"Mikol ha'ahavot" (From all the loves)	Idan Raichel's Project
Paula Valstein	"Im telekh" (If you go)	Idan Raichel's Project
Daniel Tavori	"Mey nahar" (River water)	Idan Raichel's Project
Hovi Sekulets	"Ale nisa baru'akh" (Leaf carried by the wind)	Shoshana Damari
Mei Finegold	"She'eriot shel hakhayim" (Life's leftovers)	Idan Raichel's Project

Hovi Sekulets was eliminated from the show.

=== Sixth Week ===
Was held on August 2 and August 3. The first week was where all participants performed every night. The first night's theme was Songs of Shlomi Shabat featuring Shlomi singing with the contestants, while the second night featured songs of Kdam Eurovisions, Israel's traditional show for choosing a Eurovision song. Judges ranking was 25% of the final result.

==== Sunday, August 2nd ====
Performer	Number	Original Performer	place by judges
Moran Mazuz	"Biglal Haruach" (Because of the Spirit/Wind)	Shlomi Shabat	5
Reem Cohen	"Haisha Shel Hayay" (The Woman of my Life)	Shlomi Shabat	5
Mei Finegold	"Metukim" (Sweets)	Shlomi Shabat	2
Vladi Blayberg	"Lekol Ehad" (Everyone Has)	Shlomi Shabat	5
Daniel Tavori	"Maldita Luna"	Shlomi Shabat (Originally from Spanish)	4
Liran Danino	"Harey At Mekudeshet" (You are Blesed)	Shlomi Shabat	1
Paula Valstein	"Kshe Ata Iti" (When You're with Me)	Shlomi Shabat	8
Roni Dalumi	"Eyfo At Ahuvati" (Where Are You, My Love?)	Shlomi Shabat	9
Omer Adam	"Aba" (Father)	Shlomi Shabat	3

At the end of the night, Paula Valstein was eliminated.

==== Monday, August 3rd ====
Performer	Number	Original Performer	place by judges
Vladi Bleigberg	"Diva"	Dana International	2
Omer Adam	"At Vaani" (You and I)	Shlomo Artzi	4
Roni Dalumi	"Keilu Kan" (As If Here/ The Fire In Your Eyes)	Boaz Mauda	4
Reem Cohen	"Hora"	Avi Toledano	7
Daniel Tavori	"Hallelujah"	Milk and Honey	6
Mei Finegold	"Tamid isha" (Always a woman)	Pnina Rosenblum	3
Moran Mazuz	"Halevay" (I wish)	Boaz Sharabi	8
Liran Danino	"Od nagia" (We will reach)	Yardena Arazi	1

Reem Cohen was eliminated.

=== Seventh Week ===
Was held on August 9 and August 10. This week Reem Cohen and Hovi Sekuletz who were voted off by the audience, were chosen by the audience to re-enter the competition. The first night's theme was Songs of Gidi Gov, while the second night was Songs of the Yehudim. Judges ranking was 25% of the final result.

==== Sunday, August 9th ====
Performer	Number	Original Performer	place by judges
Vladi Blayberg	"Erev Avud" (A Lost Evening)	Doda	3
Moran Mazuz	"Ma Ata Bichlal Yodea Al Ahava" (What do You Even Know Of Love?)	Gidi Gov	5
Hovi "Star" Sekulets	"Ani Shuv Mitahev" (I'm Falling in Love Again)	Gidi Gov	4
Liran Danino	"Elef Kabaim Lo Yatslihu Lechabot Oti" (A Thousand Firemen Can't Cool Me Down)	Doda	2
Roni Dalumi	"Shetach Hahefker" (Forgotten Land)	Gidi Gov	7
Mei Finegold	"Ein Od Yom" (No Other Day)	Gidi Gov	1
Re'em Cohen	"Lama Libech Kmo Kerach" (Why is your Heart like Ice?)	Gidi Gov	8
Daniel Tavori	"Shlal Sharav" (Lots of Heatwave)	Gidi Gov	6

At the end of the night, Daniel Tavori was eliminated.

==== Sunday, August 10th ====
Performer	Number	Original Performer	place by judges
Vladi Blayberg	"Im Kvar" (If Already)	Hayehudim	3
Hovi Sekulets	"Kol Hasipur" (All the Story)	Hayehudim	3
Roni Dalumi	"Lo Kal" (Not Easy)	Hayehudim	3
Re'em Cohen	"Saheck Ota" (Play It)	Hayehudim	7
Liran Danino	"Lifamim" (Sometimes)	Hayehudim	2
Mei Finegold	"Ella"	Hayehudim	1
Moran Mazuz	"Ein Lach Makom" (You Have Nowhere)	Hayehudim	3

At the end of the night, Hovi Sekulets was eliminated. Mei was awarded best weekly performance.

=== Eighth Week ===
The 8th week episodes were held on August 16 and August 17. The first night was regular duet night, while the second night featured songs of Aviv Geffen and performances with him and his ensemble. Judges ranking of the duets was 40%, and that of the solo rescues was 25% of the final result.

==== Sunday, August 16th ====
Performer	Number	Original Performer	place by judges
Roni Dalumi & May Feingold	"Ve'David Yafe Eynaim" (And David Has Pretty Eyes)	Yigal Bashan	5
Moran Mazuz & Liran Danino	"Ein Li Makom" (I Have Nowhere)	Metropolin	3
Roni Dalumi & Re'em Cohen	"Kama Haser" (How Missed)	Itzik Shamli	2
Liran Danino & Vladi Blayberg	"Mishehu Shomea Oti" (Someone Hears Me)	Eifo Hayeled	1
May Feingold & Re'em Cohen	"Halayla Levad" (Alone Tonight)	Meni Beger	6
Moran Mazuz & Vladi Blayberg	"Elohay" (My God)	Eyal Golan	4

On that evening judge Dana International assigned the nickname "Tifrak'hat HaDaloomi" (The Inflorescence of The Daloomi) to participant Roni Dalumi, a nickname which became a common reference on the show and in the media to Dalumi. Vladi & Liran qualified for Monday's show. Bottom 4 were Roni, Moran, Re'em and Mey. All sang rescue solos. These were:

Performer	Number	Original Performer	place by judges
Roni Dalumi	"Haish Hahu" (That Man)	Ahuva Ozeri & Yehudit Ravitz	3
Moran Mazuz	"Smahot Ktanot" (Little Joys)	Amir Benayun & Micha Shitrit	2
Re'em Cohen	"Ad Sof Ha'olam" (To the End of the World)	Haim Moshe & Yoav Itzhak	4
May Feingold	"Hofshia" (Free)	Sarit Hadad	1

Re'em Cohen was eliminated.

==== Monday, August 17th ====
Performer	first number	second number	Original Performer	place by judges
Liran Danino	"Ha'im Lihiyot Bah Me'ohav" (Should I be in love with you?)	"Mal'ah" (Angel)	Aviv Gefen	2
Roni Dalumi	"Hashir Shelanu" (Our Song)	"Ve'im Hazman" (And With Time)	Aviv Gefen	4
Vladi Blayberg	"SuperStar"	"Leilot Levanim" (Wight Nights)	Aviv Gefen	3
Moran Mazuz	"Ata Po Haser Li" (I Miss You Here)	"Ze Rak Hlev Shekoev Leha" (It's only the heart that hurts you)	Aviv Gefen	5
May Finegold	"Mexico"	"Sof Ha-olam" (The End of the World)	Aviv Gefen	1

Moran Mazuz was eliminated. Mei Finedolg was awarded best weekly performance, but chose to give her award (a video clip filmed by cellular cameras) to her friend and competitor Roni Dalumi. After Moran was eliminated, Mei gave her the award instead.

=== Semi-final ===
==== Sunday, August 23rd ====
At the semi-final, Liran Danino, Roni Dalumi, Mei Finegold and Vladi Blayberg competed with two numbers each: an up-tempo song, and a quiet song. Judges ranking was 25% of the final result.

Performer	First Number	Original Performer	Second Number	Original Performer	place by judges
Roni Dalumi	"Motek II" (Honey II)	Roni Duani	"Biglal Halayla" (Because of the night)	Chava Alberstein	4
Vladi Blayberg	"Notsa Baru'ach" (a feather in the wind)	Rita	"Hagiga" (celebration)	Sarit Hadad	2
Liran Danino	"Vaani Kore Lach" (And I call for you)	Eyal Golan	"Hofshi ze legamrei levad" (free is completely alone)	Benzin	1
May Feingold	"Bagilgul Haze" (in this life circle)	Shalom Hanoch	"Haleluja"	Leonard Cohen	3

In one of the most shocking twists in the history of Kokhav Nolad, the judges' favorite Liran Danino was voted off by the audience, despite being ranked first by the judges. Roni Dalumi who was ranked last by the judges, got first in the audience voting and qualified to the final in Eilat, along with Vladi Blayberg and Mei Finegold.

=== The Final ===
==== Sunday, August 30th ====
The 7th final of the show included two separate rounds of solo performances. After the first round, someone was to be voted off. The remaining two competed in a "head-to-head" combat. The judges rank was 10% of the final result after the first round.

First round performances:

Performer	Number	Original Performer	place by judges
Roni Dalumi	"Ani Esh" (I am fire)" Ran Danker		3
Vladi Blayberg	"Rikud Romanti" (a romantic dance)	Yishai Levi	2
May Feingold	"Tachzor Tachzor" (come back, come back)	Mashina	1

After the first round of performances judges' and media favorite Mei Finegold was voted off by the audience to the obvious dismay and shock of the judges who ranked her first, while competitor Roni Dalumi who was ranked last again by the judges qualified to the second round along with Vladi Blayberg. All polls before the finale showed Mei leading the voting. The difference between the third place (Finegold) and the second (Blayberg) was 1%. The difference between the second place and the first place (Daloomi) was 3% - the closest voting ever in a finale of the show. Finegold was given a chance to perform what was to be her second number (in case she qualified to the second round), an original song which she co-wrote with her own ensemble, as a consolation reward.

Second round performances:

Performer	Number	Original Performer	place by judges
Roni Dalumi	Achrei Kichlot Hakol Vehatmuna" (As the voice and the vision have perished)	Dani Basan	1
Vladi Blayberg	"HaSheket SheNish'ar" (the silence that remains)	Shiri Maimon	2

After the second round of performances Daloomi was ranked first by three of the judges, getting her first in the judges ranking for the first and only time during the season, although at this point their ranking had no impact on the final result. Moments later it was announced that the shy girl from the Negev had won the competition with 61% of the audience votes, becoming the youngest winner (being only 17 at the time) and the first female to win the show since first season's winner Ninet Tayeb. More than 900,000 votes were cast during the finale.

The finale ended with host Tsvika Hadar announcing emotionally that this time "a star was truly born" referring to the inexperienced teen who surprisingly defeated maturer, more experienced and professional singers who competed this year and were favored by the judges. This narrative led the media to refer to her victory as a "Cinderella Story". At a press conference held minutes after her victory when asked about her future plans as newly born star, the humble teen replied she still has to study for her final math exam, thus stabilizing her reputation as she was immediately crowned "Israel's Sweetheart" by the media.

== Young Participant / Old Participant ==
Participant Paula Valstein who at her audition claimed she was 28 years old turned out to be 32, after her year book picture was found and published by bloggers. Soon after, her age was inexplicably erased from her bio page in the show's website.

Six weeks into the competition, an 18-year-old blogger published in his blog that participant Omer Adam, who became a clear favorite of a major cut of the audience, had lied about his age and is actually 15 years old. The competition rules state that a person must be at least 16 years old, to audition or take part in the competition. If Omer had not lied about his age, he would not have been a part of the season. The blogger found out about Omer's age using a software containing personal information of all Israeli citizens that leaked onto the web from The Ministry of Interior. Days later the production released a statement telling that Omer dropped out of the competition after admitting to giving false information to the production.

== Hatsilu, Ani Kokhav Nolad! ==
Every Thursday, the weekly participants who received the lowest number of votes on the first two nights would have a chance to renter to competition, with the new Channel 24 program "Help! I was born a star" hosted by season 5 runner-up, Marina Maximillian Blumin. Although only one person was supposed to re-enter the competition, after participant Omer Adam had to drop out, two came back - Hovi "Star" Sekulets and Re'em Cohen.

== "Ratsiti Lashir" ==
As from the 3rd season, each edition of Kokhav Nolad is accompanied by a main theme, sung by last season's finalist. For example, the 3rd season theme was "Halomot Mitgashmim" ("Dreams do come true"), composed by Svika Pik and performed by the 3 finalists of Kokhav Nolad 2 (Harel Moyal, Harel Skaat & Adi Cohen), Kokhav Nolad 4 had "Kol Kakh Harbe Shirim" ("So Many Songs"), composed by Yoni Bloch and performed by the 3rd season winner and so on...

For Kokhav Nolad 7, Israeli musician & singer Dudu Tassa made a theme named "Ratsiti Lashir" - simply translated as "I Wanted to Sing". The final versions came up with 3 solo versions for the Kokhav Nolad 6 finalists: winner Israel Bar-On, runner up Lee Biran and Carmel Eckman, who took third place. Each lucky person, to be auditioned, had to know the song by heart, in case he or she would be asked to sing it by the judges.

== Live shows ==
Contestant	Week 1	Week 2	Week 3	Week 4	Week 5	Week 6	Week 7	Week 8	Week 9	Week 10
Roni Dalumi	Safe	Safe	Safe	Safe	Safe	Safe	Safe	Safe	Safe	Winner (week 10)
Vladi Blayberg	Safe	Safe	Safe	Safe	Safe	Safe	Safe	Safe	Safe	Runner-up (week 10)
Mei Finegold	Safe	Safe	Safe	Safe	Safe	Safe	Safe	Safe	Safe	Eliminated (week 10)
Liran Danino	Safe	Safe	Safe	Safe	Safe	Safe	Safe	Safe	Eliminated (week 9)	
Moran Mazuz	Safe	Safe	Safe	Safe	Safe	Safe	Safe	Eliminated (week 8)		
Re'em Cohen	Safe	Safe	Safe	Safe	Safe	Returned	Safe	Eliminated (week 8)		
Hovi Sekulets	Safe	Safe	Safe	Safe	Returned	Safe	Safe	Eliminated (week 7)		
Daniel Tavori	Safe	Safe	Safe	Safe	Safe	Safe	Eliminated (week 7)			
Omer Adam	Safe	Safe	Safe	Safe	Safe	Safe	Disqualified (week 6)			
Paula Valstein	Safe	Safe	Safe	Safe	Safe	Safe	Eliminated (week 6)			
Daniel Barzilay	Safe	Safe	Safe	Safe	Safe	Eliminated (week 5)				
Elchai Refoua	Safe	Safe	Safe	Safe	Eliminated (week 4)					
Or Kollenberg	Safe	Safe	Safe	Safe	Eliminated (week 4)					
Mazal Picado	Safe	Safe	Eliminated (week 3)							
Oshri Elmorish	Safe	Safe	Eliminated (week 3)							
Amor Amosi	Safe	Safe	Eliminated (week 3)							
Sagi Ossi	Safe	Eliminated (week 2)								
Tomer Yishaayahu	Safe	Eliminated (week 2)								
Ido Geraffi	Eliminated (week 1)									
Adi Cohen	Eliminated (week 1)									
Yarden Geraffi	Eliminated (week 1)									
Aya Zehavi Faygli	Eliminated (week 1)									

== See also ==
- American Idol
- Kokhav Nolad
