= Kokhav Nolad 8 =

Israeli reality TV show season

- Season 8
- Starring: Tzvika Hadar; Margalit Tzan'ani; Tsedi Tzarfati; Pavlo Rosenberg; Gal Uchovsky; Dana International

Release
- Original network: Keshet
- Original release: April 22 – September 4, 2010

Season chronology
- ← Previous; Kokhav Nolad 7 Next → Kokhav Nolad 9

Kokhav Nolad (meaning A Star Is Born) started its eighth season in of May 2010. After the victory of Roni Dalumi last year when a female won the competition for the first time since Ninet Tayeb in the first season, 27 finalists were chosen in May following thousands of auditions, which were held in Tel Aviv, Jerusalem, Beer Sheba, Sderot, Mishmar HaEmek and in the Jezreel Valley. In addition to that and, for the third time abroad, this time in Brazil following India, and the United States in the previous 2 years.

The biggest difference between the eighth and the seventh season, is that this season the new judge: Pavlo Rosenberg, a successful singer of Argentine Jewish descent replaced Tzvika Pik who decided to quit in order to promote his upcoming album. In addition to that, rather than in Eilat as in the previous season, the final of Kokhav Nolad 8 took place at the Sultan’s Pool in Jerusalem in September 2010.

== Participants ==
Men	Women
Avi Ben Abu (23, Ashdod)	Adar Gold (22, Holon)
Adir Getz (19, Atlit) -	Bat Nataf (27, Tel Aviv)
Ohad Shraga'i (26, Kfar Saba)	Diana Golbi (18, Holon) -Winner
Or Gil'adi (16, Tirat HaCarmel)	Heeba Batheesh (23, Nazareth)
Oren Koko (23, Tel Aviv)	Ma'ayan Bukris (17, Nesher)
Yuval Lev-Tov (36, Holon)	Noa Deutsch (24, Kiryat Motzkin)
Yuval Meron (24, Jerusalem)	Nikia Brown (34, Holon)
Kfir Ohayon (22, Beer Sheba)	Cecile Etelie (29, Ra'anana)
Lior Akiva (26, Nahariya)	Karina Kachulin (24, Netanya)
Muli Bachar (26, Tel Aviv)	Ravit Batashvilli (18, Ramle)
Naor Elbaz (20, Kiryat Gat)	Roni Genoussar (22, Moshav Tzofit)
Nissim Bar-Hayim (18, Ramle)	Tahel Shoham (22, Tel Aviv)
Idan Amedi (22, Jerusalem)	
Shauli Vaknin (17, Netivot)	
Shahar Elgabi (19, Rosh HaAyin)	

This year was unique in that it featured a wide array of diverse participants from drastically different backgrounds. The Host Tzvika Hadar summized that, "... Everyone could select its own favorite... each competitor has its own story and all of them collaborate together and create a unique rainbow..." In addition to that for the first time in the show's history many contestants have been singers of Mizrahi Music. Participants Included:

Cecile Etelie made Aliyah 6 years ago from France.

Idan Amedi is a commander in an IDF combat unit from the East Jerusalem neighbourhood of Pisgat Ze'ev. He has gotten good reviews almost every week with praise for his sweet voice, in contrast to his muscular body. He is seen as a favourite to win the competition.

Adar Gold is the daughter of famous Israeli singer Cherie.

Shauli Vaknin auditioned for Kokhav Nolad 7 in what could be considered humorous audition. He was out of tune, and seemingly entirely unable to sing. However, he impressed the judges auditioning this year in Beersheva where he gave a critically acclaimed performance, and was put eventually reached the finals.

Heeba Batheesh- is the second Israeli Arab to participate in this show's history (the first was Miriam Tukan in Kokhav Nolad 5 who made it to the Top 10). Like Miriam Tukan Heeba is a Christian Arab, and has been praised for her unique vocal qualities, including her ability to sing the quarter tones required for Arabic music. She often combined motifs from Arabic music in songs that were considered staples of mainstream, western-style Israeli music, and Mizrahi music creating powerful and unconventional new renditions.

Nikia Brown is an African American woman who converted to Judaism and made aliyah with her best friend, along with her husband and daughter in 2007 from Kansas City, Kansas. She speaks very little Hebrew, and has been enrolled for free in an intensive ulpan since becoming a finalist. Throughout the show she has spoken in English, but sung in very accented Hebrew mainly mispronouncing Resh, and Kaph. Due to her inability to read the Hebrew Alphabet she has had to learn each song phonetically.

Or Gil'adi is 16 years old from the Haifa suburb of Tirat HaCarmel. He received sceptism about his age at his audition . This is due to the fact that he looks several years younger than his actual age. After proving his age he sailed into the finals of the competition, with singer and judge Dana International even suggesting that he be selected as Israel's representative in the Eurovision Song Contest 2011.

Noa Deutch received critical acclaim at her audition for her self written song which in English means; "I am not a man, and not a woman". She is an LGBT, androgynous individual who has been very open about her sexuality and unique gender identity throughout the show. At different points she has identified herself as a lesbian, and at others as a Genderqueer. She works as a steelworker in Haifa.

Yuval Lev-Tov is a 36-year-old convenience store salesman who sacrificed everything for his family and children and never pursued his dream to become a singer. He is also the oldest contestant ever that passed the auditions.

Kfir Ohayon became known for his extremely high voice, and the fact that he sang 2 or three octaves above middle C each week. He sang mostly Mizrahi music until he was eliminated on the second week of the live performances.

Lior Akiva is a bodybuilder from Nahariya, he works as a municipal security guard. He made Aliyah as a young child from Brazil and was adopted by Israeli parents.

Roni Genoussar became known for her new-age appearance and attire. She has been praised for her impressive vocal abilities, and uniqueness. She is diagnosed with Savant syndrome.

== Live shows ==
Contestant	Week 1	Week 2	Week 3	Week 4	Week 5	Week 6	Week 7	Week 8	Week 9	Week 10	Week 11	Week 12	Week 13
Diana Golbi	Safe	Safe	Safe	Safe	Safe	Safe	Safe	Safe	Safe	Safe	Safe	Safe	Winner (week 13)
Idan Amedi	Safe	Safe	Safe	Safe	Safe	Safe	Safe	Safe	Safe	Safe	Safe	Safe	Runner-Up (week 13)
Ohad Shraga'i	Safe	Safe	Safe	Safe	Safe	Safe	Safe	Safe	Safe	Safe	Safe	Safe	Third Place (week 13)
Naor Elbaz	Safe	Safe	Safe	Safe	Safe	Eliminated	Out	Out	Returned	Safe	Safe	Eliminated (week 12)	
Adar Gold	Safe	Safe	Safe	Safe	Safe	Eliminated	Out	Out	Returned	Safe	Safe	Eliminated (week 11)	
Or Giladi	Safe	Safe	Safe	Safe	Safe	Safe	Safe	Safe	Safe	Safe	Eliminated (week 11)		
Avi Ben Abu	Safe	Safe	Safe	Safe	Safe	Safe	Safe	Safe	Safe	Eliminated (week 10)			
Ma'ayan Bukris	Safe	Safe	Safe	Safe	Safe	Safe	Safe	Safe	Safe	Eliminated (week 10)			
Yuval Meron	Safe	Safe	Safe	Safe	Safe	Safe	Safe	Safe	Eliminated (week 9)				
Yuval Lev-Tov	Safe	Safe	Safe	Safe	Safe	Safe	Safe	Safe	Eliminated (week 9)				
Roni Genoussar	Safe	Safe	Safe	Safe	Safe	Safe	Safe	Eliminated (week 8)					
Bat Nataf	Safe	Safe	Safe	Safe	Safe	Safe	Safe	Eliminated (week 8)					
Noa Deutsch	Safe	Safe	Safe	Safe	Safe	Safe	Eliminated (week 7)						
Tael Shoham	Safe	Safe	Safe	Safe	Safe	Safe	Eliminated (week 7)						
Heeba Batheesh	Safe	Safe	Safe	Safe	Safe	Eliminated (week 6)							
Lior Akiva	Safe	Safe	Safe	Safe	Safe	Eliminated (week 6)							
Nikia Brown	Safe	Safe	Safe	Safe	Eliminated (week 5)								
Ravit Batashvilli	Safe	Safe	Safe	Safe	Eliminated (week 5)								
Shahar Elgabi	Safe	Safe	Safe	Eliminated (week 4)									
Nissim Bar-Hayim	Safe	Safe	Safe	Eliminated (week 4)									
Adir Getz	Safe	Safe	Eliminated (week 3)										
Kfir Ohayon	Safe	Safe	Eliminated (week 3)										
Cecile Etelie	Safe	Eliminated (week 2)											
Oren Koko	Safe	Eliminated (week 2)											
Muli Bachar	Eliminated (week 1)												
Shauli Vaknin	Eliminated (week 1)												
Karina Kachulin	Eliminated (week 1)												
