= Diana Golbi =

Israeli singer and actress (born 1992)

Diana Golbi דיאנה גולבי
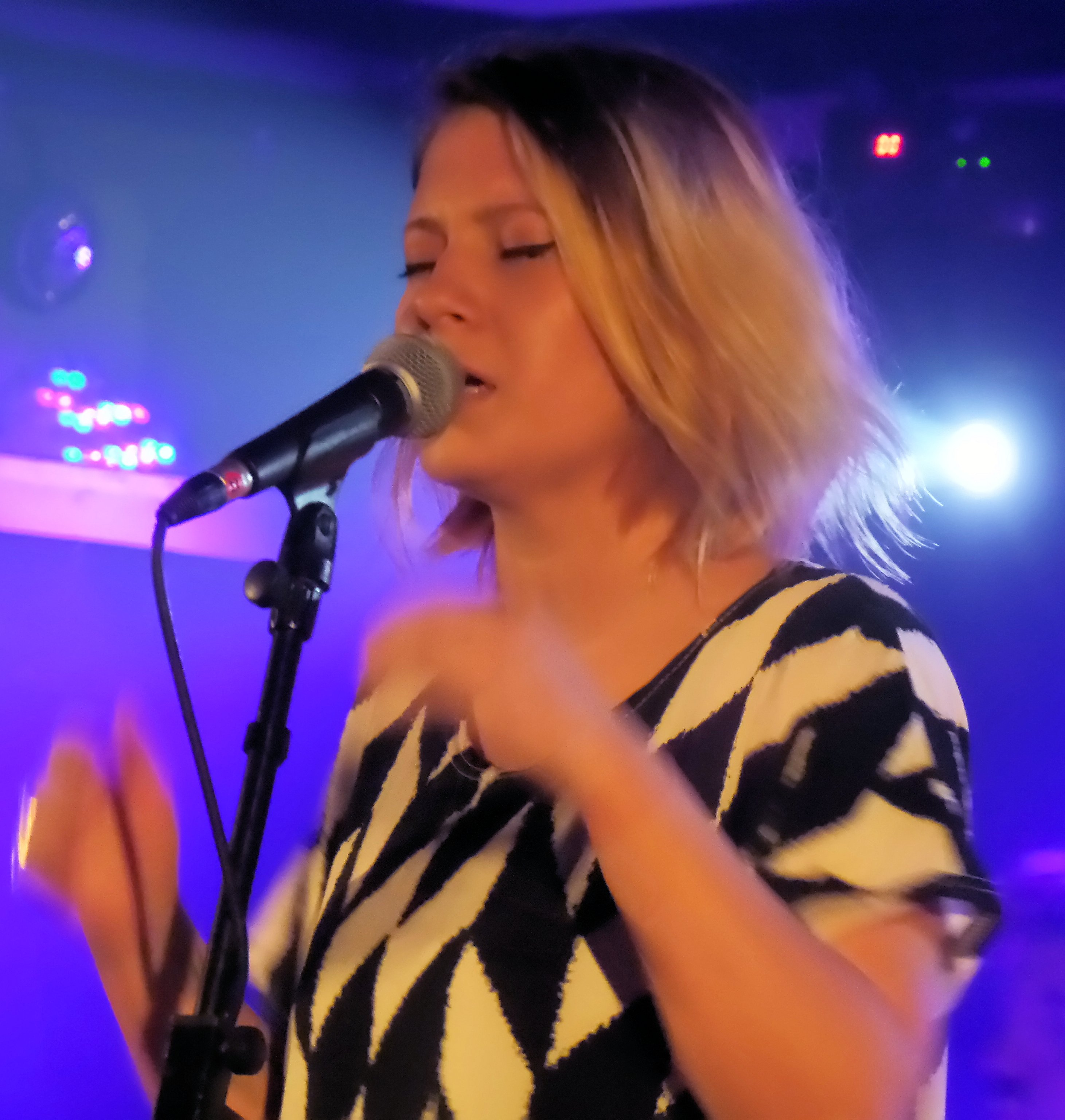
- Golbi performing with Full Trunk band at Akko's Jam club

Background information
- Birth name: Diana Igorevna Golovanova
- Born: January 16, 1992 (age 33); Moscow, Russia
- Origin: Holon, Israel
- Genres: Israeli rock, pop, showtunes
- Occupation(s): Singer, actress
- Years active: 2010–present (music)

Diana Golbi (Hebrew: דיאנה גולבי; born January 16, 1992) is an Israeli-Russian actress and singer, the eighth winner of Kokhav Nolad, the Israeli version of Pop Idol. Golbi is the third female participant to win the show (following Ninet Tayeb on the first season and Roni Dalumi on the seventh season).

== Personal life ==
Golbi was born as Diana Igorevna Golovanova (Russian: Диана Игоревна Голованова) in Moscow, Russia. When she turned four, her parents decided to immigrate to Israel, and resided in the city of Holon. During her childhood, Golbi "fell in love" with the stage. She studied theatre in an American studio, and when she was 12, she went to perform in a big theatre in St. Petersburg. She served as an instructor in the Teleprocessing Corps of the Israel Defense Forces.

During 2008 Golbi and her friends formed a rock band, called HaRusim (Hebrew: הרוסים). HaRusim is a double meaning: it means both "The Ruined Ones" and "The Russian Ones" in Hebrew, since the members of the band are all Russian originally.

Studied acting in the Nissan Nativ Acting Studio in Tel Aviv 2015-2018

== TV and theater ==
During 2017, played the role of "Eponine" in the Habima Theater's production of Les Misérables. In 2019, played Eli in "Lazarus", a musical inspired by the songs of David Bowie. Since 2019 she is playing Irena in the Beit Lessin theater's musical Zero Motivation.

Golbi plays Yulia Zuckerman in the Israeli television police series Manayek.

In 2021, Golbi voiced Dawn in the Hebrew dub of The Croods: A New Age. In 2023, she voiced Princess Peach in the Hebrew version of The Super Mario Bros. Movie.

== Kokhav Nolad 8 ==
During 2010, Golbi went to audition for the eighth season of Kokhav Nolad and was accepted. In the night of September 4, 2010, she won 53% of the votes and beat Idan Amedi, and was therefore crowned as the winner of Kokhav Nolad 8. She won a production contract from the music producer Louis Lahav.

=== Kohav Nolad performances ===
Week #	Song Choice	Original Artist	Result
Top 27	"Ad sof haka'itz" (Until summer ends)	Dani Litani	Safe
Top 24	"Niga el hakhalom" (We'll touch the dream) – Duet with Yuval Meron	Shalom Hanoch	Safe
Top 18 – Miri Mesika & Keren Peles special	"Mabul" (Flood)	Keren Peles	Safe
Top 15 – Svika Pik special	"Ahava besof haka'itz"	Svika Pik	Safe
Top 14	"Yamei hatom" (Innocence days)	Rita	Safe
Top 13	"Badad" (Loneliness) – Duet with Avi Ben Abu	Zohar Argov	Safe
Top 11 – Rami Kleinstein special	"Livkot" (To cry)	Rami Kleinstein	Safe
Top 10 – Yehuda Poliker special	"Shlal sharav" (Heavy heat)	Yehuda Poliker	Safe
Top 9 – Sarit Hadad special	"Khagiga" (Celebration)	Sarit Hadad	Safe
Top 8	"Od lo dibarnu al ahava" (We haven't spoken about love yet)	Netanela	Safe
Top 9 (after 2 Rescued) – Danny Sanderson special	"Yo-ya"	Poogy	Safe
Top 8	"Im telekh mikan" (Ne Me Quitte Pas)	Jacques Brel (heb: Barak Feldman)	Safe
Top 7 – Mizrahi special	"Ad matay, elohay?" (Until when, my God?)	Zohar Argov	Safe
Top 6 – Battle against Or Gil'adi.	"Krav igruf" (Boxing match)	Efrat Gosh	Safe
Top 5	"Ashlayot" (Illusions)	Nissim Sarussi	Safe
Top 4 (Semi-final)	"Yeladim shel hakhayim" (Children of life)	Arik Einstein	Final qualifier
Finale	"Einaich" (Your eyes) "Shvil habrikha" (Escaping path)	Mazi Cohen; Rita	Winner

== HaKokhav HaBa ==
In 2017, Golbi entered the 4th season of HaKokhav HaBa. In her first performance she sang "Alive", a song which was originally sung by Sia. She got a score of 95% for that performance, which was broadcast on Israeli TV on January 2, 2017. She became the runner-up of the show, after Imri Ziv.

Awards and achievements
Preceded by Roni Dalumi	Kokhav Nolad winner 2010	Succeeded by Hagit Yaso
