= Hagit Yaso =

Israeli singer

Hagit Yaso חגית יאסו
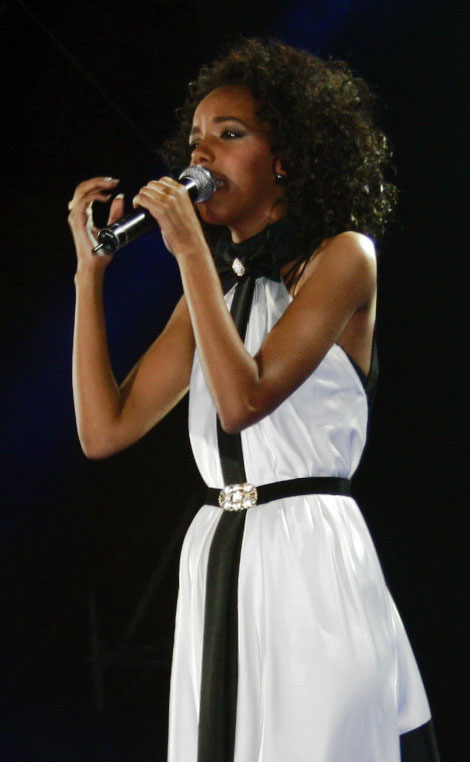

Background information
- Born: October 8, 1989 (age 36); Sderot, Israel
- Instrument: Vocals
- Years active: 2009–present

Hagit Yaso (Hebrew: חגית יאסו; born October 8, 1989) is an Israeli singer. She won the ninth season of Kokhav Nolad, an Israeli television show, similar to Pop Idol.

== Early life ==
Yaso is of Ethiopian Jewish descent. She was born in Sderot, and has two brothers and two sisters. Yaso's parents immigrated to Israel from Ethiopia in the 1980s through Sudan. From an early age she loved to sing, and later on became a member of the band "Sderot Youth" (צעירי שדרות), in which she participated along with her sisters. During her military service, Yaso served in a military band. She is featured in the documentary film Sderot: Rock in the Red Zone.

In 2011, she participated in the Kokhav Nolad 9. In her audition, Yaso sang Amir Benayoun's song Omed BaSha'ar (עומד בשער; "Standing at the gate"). During the show, Yaso sang in several languages, including Hebrew, English, Amharic and Moroccan Arabic. From the beginning of the show, Yaso stood out and she was often rated by the judges panel for having an "outstanding performance". Yaso reached the finals, which were held in Haifa, together with David Lavi and Liron Ramati. The first song Yaso sang in the finals was Ofra Haza's "Mishehu Tamid Holech Iti" (מישהו תמיד הולך איתי) and Idan Raichel's song "Medabrim Besheket" (מדברים בשקט). Yaso ended up winning first place with 60% of the votes. She won a scholarship of 240,000 shekels, and a production contract from the well known music producer Ivri Lider.

After winning, Yaso and her parents were invited to the president's residence, where President Shimon Peres discussed with her parents their immigration to Israel from Ethiopia, and her involvement in Kokhav Nolad.

Yaso has toured and performed internationally. In January 2013, she toured in several cities across the US sponsored by Jewish National Fund. The highlight of her tour was a performance at the Saban Theatre in Los Angeles, where she performed a duet of "Killing Me Softly" with the song's writer Charles Fox.

== Personal life ==
In 2011, Yaso began dating the Israeli former child actor Eliad Nachum (played in Shemesh), who previously performed with her in a military band during their military service. He is now a popular singer. They have since broken up.

Awards and achievements
Preceded by Diana Golbi	Kokhav Nolad winner 2011	Succeeded by Or Taragan
