= Roni Daloomi =

Israeli singer and actress

Roni Daloomi רוני דלומי
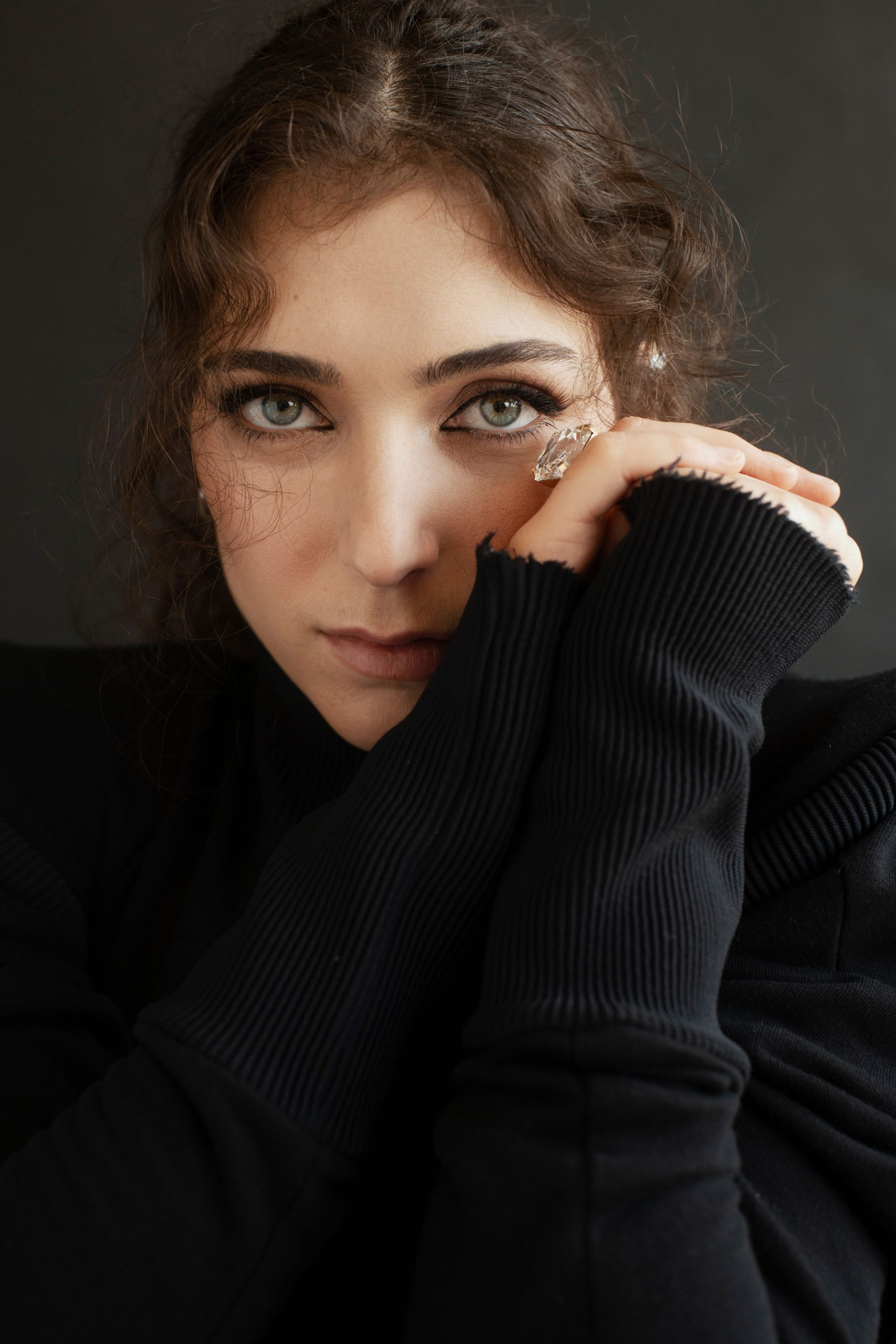
- Daloomi in 2023

Background information
- Born: September 15, 1991 (age 35); Beersheba, Israel
- Genres: Pop; rock; Israeli Hebrew music
- Occupations: Singer-songwriter; actress
- Years active: 2009–present

Roni Daloomi (or Dalumi; Hebrew: רוני דלומי; born September 15, 1991) is an Israeli singer-songwriter and actress. She is the winner of the singing competition show Kochav Nolad 7 in 2009. She starred in the original Israeli series Euphoria.

== Early life ==
Daloomi was born in Beersheba and raised in the neighbouring town of Omer to Israeli-born parents of both Libyan-Jewish and Iraqi-Jewish descent. Until the age of 12 she studied dance at Bat-Dor Beer Sheva Municipal Dance Centre in Beersheba. She majored in theatre at the Mekif Omer High School.

She participated in a children's song festival Shir Nolad in 2006, that took place during the eight-days Jewish holiday of Hanukkah.

In 2010, Daloomi was enlisted to the Israel Defense Forces (IDF), and served for two years in the military band of the Education and Youth Corps.

== Star is Born contest ==
Daloomi was the judges' least favorite contestant in Israel's Kokhav Nolad after being ranked last by most of them throughout the season, especially by Gal Uchovsky. Despite this, Daloomi was saved by the audience every time, eventually making it to the final in Eilat, Israel, where she won the competition with 61% of the votes (after being ranked last by the judges once again). Daloomi is the youngest winner of the show to date, being only 17 years old at the time, and the first female to win since first season's winner Ninet Tayeb.

Auditions:

Audition	Number	Original Performer	Additional information
First Solo Audition	"Shir Le'lo Shem" (A Song Without A Name)	Yehudit Ravitz	
Second Audition	"Hak'hnisini" (Put Me)	Rita	A capella audition
Third Audition	"Kol Ma She'Nishar" (Everything That's Left)	Boten Matok Ba'Kirkas	Duet audition
Fourth Audition	"Haish Ha'hu" (That Man)	Yehudit Ravitz and Ahuva Ozeri	Final audition.

Performances during the competition:

Week	Number	Original Performer	Additional information
First Week (June 28)	"Tiftach Halon" (Open a window)	Rita	
Second Week (July 5)	"Hak'hayim Yafim" (Life Is Beautiful)	Achinoam Nini	Ranked last by the judges, saved by the audience.
Third Week (July 12)	"Tzliley Hasheket" (The Sound of Silence)	Ha'Parvarim (org. version Simon and Garfunkel)	Duet with Or Kolenberg. Ranked last by the judges, saved by the audience.
Third Week (July 13)	"Halomot Shmurim" (Safe Dreams)	Izhar Cohen	Ehud Manor special.
Fourth Week (July 19)	"Femme Fatale"	Yuval Banai (org. version Velvet Underground)	Duet with Mei Finegold.
Fourth Week (July 20)	"Matchila Mehatchala" (Starting anew)	Mango	Ranked last by Gal Uchovsky
Fifth Week (July 26)	"Hi" (She)	Matti Caspi (org. version Elvis Costello)	Duet with Paula Valstein. Ranked Last by the judges. Bottom two.
Fifth Week (July 26)	"Ba'a Elechem" (Come to you)	Miri Mesika	Rescue solo. Ranked last by Gal Uchovsky. Safe.
Fifth week (July 27)	"Cada Dia" (Everyday)	Idan Raichel's Project	Sung entirely in Spanish.
Sixth Week (August 4)	"Eifo At Ahavati" (Where are you my love)	Shlomi Shabat	Ranked last by the judges, saved by the audience.
Sixth Week (August 4)	"Keilu Kan" (As if Here/The Fire In Your Eyes)	Boaz Mauda	
Seventh Week (August 11)	"Shetah Hahefker" (Forgotten Land)	Gidi Gov	Ranked last by Gal Uchovsky
Seventh Week (August 11)	"Lo Kal" (Not Easy)	HaYehudim	
Eighth Week (August 18)	"VeDavid Yafe Einaim" (And David has beautiful eyes)	Yigal Bashan	Duet with Mei Finegold
Eighth Week (August 18)	"Kama K'haser" (How Missed)	Itzik Shamli	Duet with Re'em Cohen
Eighth Week (August 18)	"Haish Ha'hu" (That Man)	Yehudit Ravitz and Ahuva Ozeri	Rescue solo. Safe.
Eighth Week (August 19)	"Hashir Shelanu" (Our Song)	Aviv Geffen	
Eighth Week (August 19)	"Ve'im Hazman" (And With Time)	Aviv Geffen	Ranked last by Gal Uchovsky
Ninth Week - Semi Final (August 26)	"Motek II" (Honey II)	Roni Duani	
Ninth Week - Semi Final (August 26)	"Biglal Halayla" (Because Of The Night)	Chava Alberstein	Ranked last by the judges. Saved by the audience and qualified to the final.
Tenth Week - Final (August 30)	"Kichlot Hakol VeHatmuna" (As the voice and the vision have perished)	Danni Bassan	Ranked last by the judges, saved by the audience.
Tenth Week - Final (August 30)	"Ani Esh" (I Am Fire)	Ran Danker	Ranked first by the judges.

== Music career ==
Daloomi released her first single, "Ten" (Give) in April 2010. "Ten" was a Hebrew version to Gloria Estefan's "Hoy", with Hebrew lyrics written by Gilad Segev. The song was nominated for "Song Of The Year." Three months later she released her second single (also a Latin cover): "Ktzat Acheret" (A Little Different), bringing Daloomi nominations for "Singer Of The Year." She won the title on Channel 24 and the children's Channel. "Ten" was voted "Song Of The Year" on the Children's Channel. In November 2010, her third single, critically acclaimed "Kach O' Kach" (Either way), a cover of Robi Draco Rosa's "Crash Push" (English version of the song "Más y Más"), was released.

Daloomi released her debut album titled Ktzat Acheret (A Little Different) on December 20, 2010. The album includes ten songs in the spirit of Latin Music, including two songs which Daloomi co-wrote, and a duet with Colombian singer Marta Gomez to her song "Paula Ausente"(Absent Paula), which came out as a single in February 2011. The album received generally positive reviews, but was also criticized for consisting of mostly covered versions of Latin pop music from South America. The idea for the cover-concept album of Latin Music came after Daloomi's much praised performance of "Cada Dia" (Everyday), a song originally performed by Marta Gomez in the third Idan Raichel's Project album.

Daloomi released the song "Shilchi Oto" (Send Him Away) in April 2011. The song, written by Binyamin Frank and composed by Ronit Shachar, is from a memorial day project by Galei Tzahal radio station called "Od Me'at Nahafoch Leshir" (Soon We'll Become A Song) that gathers lyrics and poetry by deceased IDF soldiers and have them composed and performed by Israeli artists.

Daloomi took part in the annual Israeli children's songs' competition Festigal (during the Jewish holiday of Hanukkah), in the role of Scheherazade, performing with the song Nigmeru Li HaMilim (lit. I'm Out Of Words) and won second place.

In 2016, she played the role of Éponine in the musical Les Misérables, staged at the Habima Theatre.

On July 8, 2013, Daloomi released her second album, Tahaziku. The album consists of ten songs, including the first single that released from the album And his theme song "Tahaziku" (hold). In addition, the album includes another three singles: "Panai laruach" (my face to the wind), "Stam shnei anashim" (just two people) and "Ktze haiom" (end of the day). The first two singles released on 2012, and the last two in 2013.

Other songs from the album include "Karka'it nemucha" (a low ground) and "Yom shishi" (Friday) (like "Saturday night" in Israel) released as singles after the album released, in 2013 and 2014, respectively.

== Personal life ==
Daloomi is married to ophthalmologist Alon Weissman. They live in the city of Gani Tikva and had their first daughter in November 2023.

== See also ==
- Music of Israel
- Women of Israel
- Women in the Israel Defense Forces
- List of Israelis

Awards and achievements
Preceded by Israel Bar-On	Kokhav Nolad winner 2009	Succeeded by Diana Golbi
