= Kokhav Nolad =

Israeli reality TV show

- Hebrew: כוכב נולד
- Created by: Simon Fuller
- Presented by: Zvika Hadar (1–10)
- Judges: Izhar Ashdot (1); Matti Caspi (1); Roni Brown (1-2); Tzedi Tzarfati (2–10); Riki Gal (2–3); Svika Pick (3–7); Margalit Tzan'ani (4–9); Gal Uchovsky (4–8); Dana International (7–8); Pablo Rosenberg (8); Miri Mesika (9–10); Yair Nitzani (9); Gidi Gov (10); Moshe Peretz (10)
- Country of origin: Israel
- No. of seasons: 10

Production
- Running time: Varies between 90 and 120 minutes

Original release
- Network: Keshet, Channel 2
- Release: May 2003 – September 2012

Related
- HaKokhav HaBa

Kokhav Nolad (Hebrew: כּוֹכָב נוֹלַד; meaning "A Star Is Born") was an Israeli reality television show searching for talented new vocalists, based on the British Pop Idol model. Since its debut on Israeli Channel 2 in 2003, Kokhav Nolad has become popular and turned out many new musical stars. The show was hosted by Zvika Hadar.

== Summary ==
Season	Year	Winner	Runner-up	Third
1	May and August 2003	Ninet Tayeb	Shiri Maimon	Shay Gabso
2	February to August 2004	Harel Moyal	Harel Skaat	Adi Cohen
3	March to August 2005	Yehuda Saado	Michael Kirkilan	Shir Biton
4	May to September 2006	Jacko Eisenberg	Maya Rotman	Refael Mirila
5	May 18 – August 29, 2007	Bo'az Ma'uda	Marina Maximilian Blumin	Shlomi Bar'el
6	May 25 – August 26, 2008	Israel Bar-On	Lee Biran	Carmel Eclman
7	May 24 – August 30, 2009	Roni Dalumi	Vladi Blayberg	Mei Finegold
8	April 22 – September 4, 2010	Diana Golbi	Idan Amedi	Ohad Shraga'i
9	April 2 – July 23, 2011	Hagit Yaso	David Lavi	Liron Ramati
10	May 22 - September 4, 2012	Or Taragan	Itan Grinberg	Anita Gassin

== Format ==
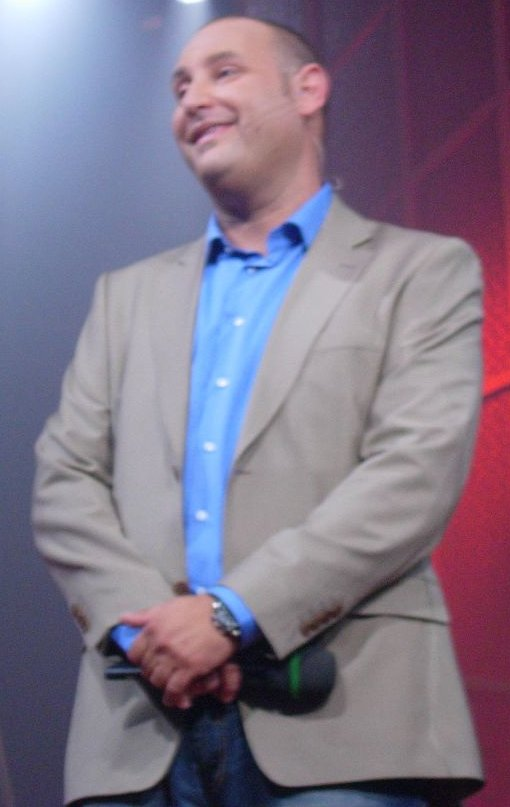
Zvika Hadar, host of Kokhav Nolad

The format of Kokhav Nolad was similar to Pop Idol and its spinoffs, like American Idol, but was independently produced and not a licensed adaptation. The contest was open to aspiring singers, most of them in their late teens and early 20s, who appeared before a panel of judges, who evaluated their performances. The audience was then asked to vote for their favorite singer. In every round, whoever received the fewest votes leaves the competition until only one is left, who is declared the winner. Kokhav Nolad was preceded by another program called Lo Nafsik Lashir, in which the participants competed in their knowledge of Hebrew songs, not on the quality of their singing.

The season included a number of preliminary episodes in which open auditions were held across Israel. Immediately after that, the quarter final round started in which two or three competitors performed every week; the one who got the most votes moved on to the semi final round. The semi final was divided into two shows with 4-5 competitors in each show. The 3 who got the most votes went on to the finale.

== Judges ==
The judges started in the second season, after a small change in the show format. The judge panel included Riki Gal, Tsedi Tzarfati and Roni Brown. In the third season Svika Pick replaced Ronny Brown. The fourth season had two new judges, Gal Uchovsky and Margalit Tzan'ani, who joined Tzarfati and Pick. Dana International joined the ranks in the 7th season and Pablo Rosenberg in the 8th season. In the 9th season the singer Miri Mesika and the musician Yair Nitzani replaced Gal Ochovsky, Dana International and Pavlo Rozenberg. In the 10th season Moshe Peretz and Gidi Gov replaced Margalit Tzan'ani and Yair Nitzani.

== Audition song ==
Since the 3rd season, each season of the program has had a theme song. The 3rd season theme was "Halomot Mitgashmim" ("Dreams do come true"), composed by Svika Pik and performed by the 3 finalists of Kokhav Nolad 2 (Harel Moyal, Harel Skaat & Adi Cohen, Kokhav Nolad 4 had "Kol Kakh Harbe Shirim" ("So many songs"), composed by Yoni Bloch and performed by the 3rd season winner, Yehuda Saado, the 5th season was brought up with "Kashe li lo lehitragesh" ("It's hard for me not to stress") with Kokhav Nolad 4 winner & runner up - Jacko Eisenberg & Maya Rotthman, Kokhav Nolad 5 was the same with "Mi haya ma'amin?" ("Who would believe?") from Keren Peles and performed by Boaz Mauda & Marina Maximillian Blumin. For Kokhav Nolad 7, Israeli musician & singer Dudu Tassa made a theme named "Ratsiti Lashir" - simply translated as "I wanted to sing". The final versions came up with 3 solo version of Kokhav Nolad 6 finalists - winner Israel Bar-On, runner up Lee Biran and Carmel Eckman who took the third place. The 8th season's auditions song is "Achshav Tori (It's my turn now)" written by Mosh Ben Ari and is performed by season 7 winner Roni Dalumi. The 9th season's auditions song is "Haderech Shelcha (Your way)" composed by Idan Amedi and is performed by Kokhav Nolad 8 winner & runner up - Diana Golbi & Idan Amedi.

== Seasons ==
=== Season 1 (2003) ===
The first season of Kokhav Nolad ran between May and August 2003. The first season was a collaboration with an earlier Israeli TV program called לא נפסיק לשיר (meaning We will not stop singing) that had started in 2002. The 2003 season, the second and last of the original music quiz program and the first of Kokhav Nolad (כוכב נולד) was jointly called "לא נפסיק לשיר - כוכב נולד". After this initial joint season, Kokhav Nolad was launched separately as an independent show in 2004.

The finale was held on 28 August 2003 at the Nitzanim Beach in front of a live audience of 7,000 people. The judges for the final were the Israeli composer and producer Roni Brown רוני בראון and singer Izhar Ashdot (יזהר אשדות).

Ninet Tayeb won first place with the song "Yam Shel Dma'ot" (A Sea of Tears), after receiving 49.3% of the audience votes in the final. Shiri Maimon was runner-up with the song "Don Quixote" after receiving 28.2% of the votes. Shay Gabso came third with 22.5% after performing "Esh" (Fire). Over 1.4 million votes were cast during the final.

=== Season 2 (2004) ===
The second season of Kokhav Nolad was held from February to August 2004. The final was broadcast on August 15, 2004 from Coca Cola Music Village at the Nitzanim Beach, in front of an audience of 7,500 people. Harel Moyal won the contest with 862,368 votes, Harel Skaat took second place with 806,292 votes, and Adi Cohen took third place with 254,926 votes. Almost 2 million votes were cast during the final.

Since Skaat won first place and Moyal second in the first semi-final against Harel Moyal, and since polls held at certain sites indicated that Harel Skaat would win, many were surprised when he did not. A controversy arose about the voting in the final, beginning with claims that the production company had forged the results and ending with claims that voters had used software to send in more votes for their candidate than was allowed by program regulations (250 votes per apparatus). The production staff denied all of these allegations. On Thursday, August 19, a small demonstration of about 20 Harel Skaat fans was held in front of the offices of Shidurey Keshet. The demonstrators demanded that they investigate the claims and recount the votes. Keshet Broadcasting reported that the matter was investigated and no irregularities were found.

=== Season 3 (2005) ===
The third season of Kokhav Nolad was held from March to August 2005. The final was held on August 29, 2005 in Tel Aviv in front of thousands of people. Yehuda Sa'ado won first place with the song "Sadot Shel Irusim," getting 918,520 votes, Michael Kirkilan won second place with "Yesh BeLibi Kinor," getting 370,631 votes, and Shir Biton won third place with "Smakhot Ktanot," getting 322,288 votes. 1.6 million viewers tuned in to watch the winning moment.

=== Season 4 (2006) ===
The fourth season of Kokhav Nolad ran from May to September 2006. The final was held on September 7, 2006 at Volume Tel Aviv, in front of an audience of 40,000 people, attracting over a million viewers. Jacko Eisenberg won 1st place with 846,039 votes and Maya Rotman was the runner-up with 514,981 votes.

=== Season 5 (2007) ===
The fifth season of Kokhav Nolad was held in 2007. The final of Kokhav Nolad 5 was held on Golan Beach in the eastern side of the Sea of Galilee (opposite the city of Tiberias, west of the sea) on August 29, 2007. After the first semifinal, Zvika Hadar announced that Marina Maximillian Blumin had qualified. In the second semifinal Boaz Ma'uda won first place in his bracket. Chen Aharoni went into a head-to-head with Shlomi Bar'el, with Shlomi coming out as the victor. As such Marina, Boaz, and Shlomi were the final three contestants. a first for the series was the participation of Miriam Tukan, in the fifth season, becoming the first Arab participant of Kokhav Nolad.

Bo'az Ma'uda won with 50% of the vote, Marina Maximilian Blumin - 27% was runner and Shlomi Bar'el third with 23% of the vote. Bar'el went on to sign a contract with Hed Arzi Music and Blumin with Helicon Records. In addition, Chen Aharoni and Adir Ohayon, reached deals with NMC Music.

=== Season 6 (2008) ===
The winner was Israel Bar-On.

=== Season 7 (2009) ===
An addition to the new season, of the show, was transsexual singer and former Eurovision Song Contest winner Dana International, who joined the show as a judge, fifth in the panel that includes composer Svika Pik, singer Margalit Tsanani, director and choreographer Tsedi Tsarfati, plus writer and music critic Gal Uchovsky. The show's host as usual was comedian Zvika Hadar.

Auditions were held in Israel in Tel Aviv, Beersheba, and Haifa. While in Kokhav Nolad 6, auditions were also held in India; this time the judges went to find singers in the Americas. The finale was broadcast live from Eilat.

The average age of the seventh season was remarkably low, because many of the contestants had not finished high school when the show aired.

Although the show is mostly dedicated to Israeli and Hebrew music, this year the participants were allowed to sing some songs in Arabic, English, Russian and Spanish.

On August 23, the finalists were announced to be Mei Finegold, Vladi Blayberg and Roni Dalumi, Ron Dalumi winning the competition with 61% of the votes.

=== Season 8 (2010) ===
The winner was Diana Golbi.

=== Season 9 (2011) ===
The auditions started in January 2011 and the televised season in April 2011. The winner was Hagit Yaso.

=== Season 10 (2012) ===
The auditions started in late 2011 and the televised season in May 2012. The winner was Or Taragan.

== Show cancellation ==
On 20 May 2013, it was announced that judge Moshe Peretz was leaving the show to host the first season of The X Factor Israel on a competing station, Reshet. The other judges from season 10 Miri Mesika and Gidi Gov also confirmed they were leaving and would not return to the show. Kokhav Nolad that show was later officially replaced by HaKokhav HaBa.

== Impact ==
The program became a microcosm of the Israeli society. With its massive following became social phenomenon. The first series winner Ninette Tayeb, came from Kiryat Gat, inhabited by mainly Sephardi/Mizrahi Jews notably from North Africa. Her win was interpreted as an advance for Sephardic Jews. She would return in a television role in the series HaShir Shelanu (Hebrew: השיר שלנו, lit. Our Song) as an unknown country girl who became a big star despite all odds.

Yehuda Saado, the third season winner, with his religious attire and interpretations was considered as representative of the conservative religious elements in the country.

Fourth season winner Jacko Eisenberg raised the question of serving in the Israeli Army. Contrary to first season winner Ninette Tayeb who served in the IDF, and to Harel Moyal winner in season 2, a soldier in the Israel Border Police, also composing songs for the military forces, with Idan Amedi auditioning with a song he wrote while in the Israeli Combat Engineering Corps, Eisenberg said publicly in an interview that he would not serve in the military, raising protests against his defiant declarations and led to calls for his boycott. In response, Kokhav Nolad held special auditions at various Army outlets to encourage those in military service to try to apply for the competition.

The fifth season scored another cornerstone for the competition with Miriam Tukan, a Palestinian Christian contestant from I'billin, an Arab town in North Israel taking part as the first ever Arab contestant. Huge media attention focused on her with her insistence in incorporating Arab-themed music in her interpretations rather than the general Jewish content of other contestants. An article in Haaretz even discussed the possibility of an Arab contestant winning the show. The Arab and international media also focused on her participation with varying views. Some judges also expressed reservations with her accent and pronunciation. Tukan did not make it to the finals and the fifth season title went to Bo'az Ma'uda who would eventually represent Israel in the Eurovision Song Contest.

Season 7 saw a big controversy over contestant Omer Adam, one of the most popular contestants of the season and tipped to win the title, until blogger Omri Hayon and Ynet online news service revealed that Omer was just 15 years and 7 months when he applied. The minimum age for applying for the show is 16 years. Omer Adam admitted that the allegation was correct and withdrew from the competition mid-way through the season. Omer Adam's disqualification was announced officially on August 5, 2009. Adam went on to enjoy a successful career despite the controversy.

The changing ethnic landscape of Israeli society was also highlighted with the title win by Diana Golbi, a Russian Jew in season 8. Golbi had been born in Moscow. Of big impact was the participation of Hagit Yaso, an Ethiopian immigrant, another first for the program in season 9. She was avidly supported by the Ethiopian Israelis as a representative of their community and took the title for the season.

Despite the popularity of the program, Kokhav Nolad has been accused of promoting theatrics, promoting false stories, banalization of true artistic music and manipulation of contestants and their abuse. Artists publicly criticizing the show included Chava Alberstein (חוה אלברשטיין) and Yehoram Gaon (יהורם גאון). Contestant, even season winners were accused of not contributing anything original to Israeli music after their wins. Many also criticized the over-commercialization of the program through its sponsors and manipulating presentations to promote commercial interests. But others defended the program for providing opportunities for many new upcoming talents to shine and have success.
