= Marina Maximilian Blumin =

Israeli singer-songwriter and actress (born 1987)

Marina Maximilian Blumin מארינה מקסימיליאן בלומין
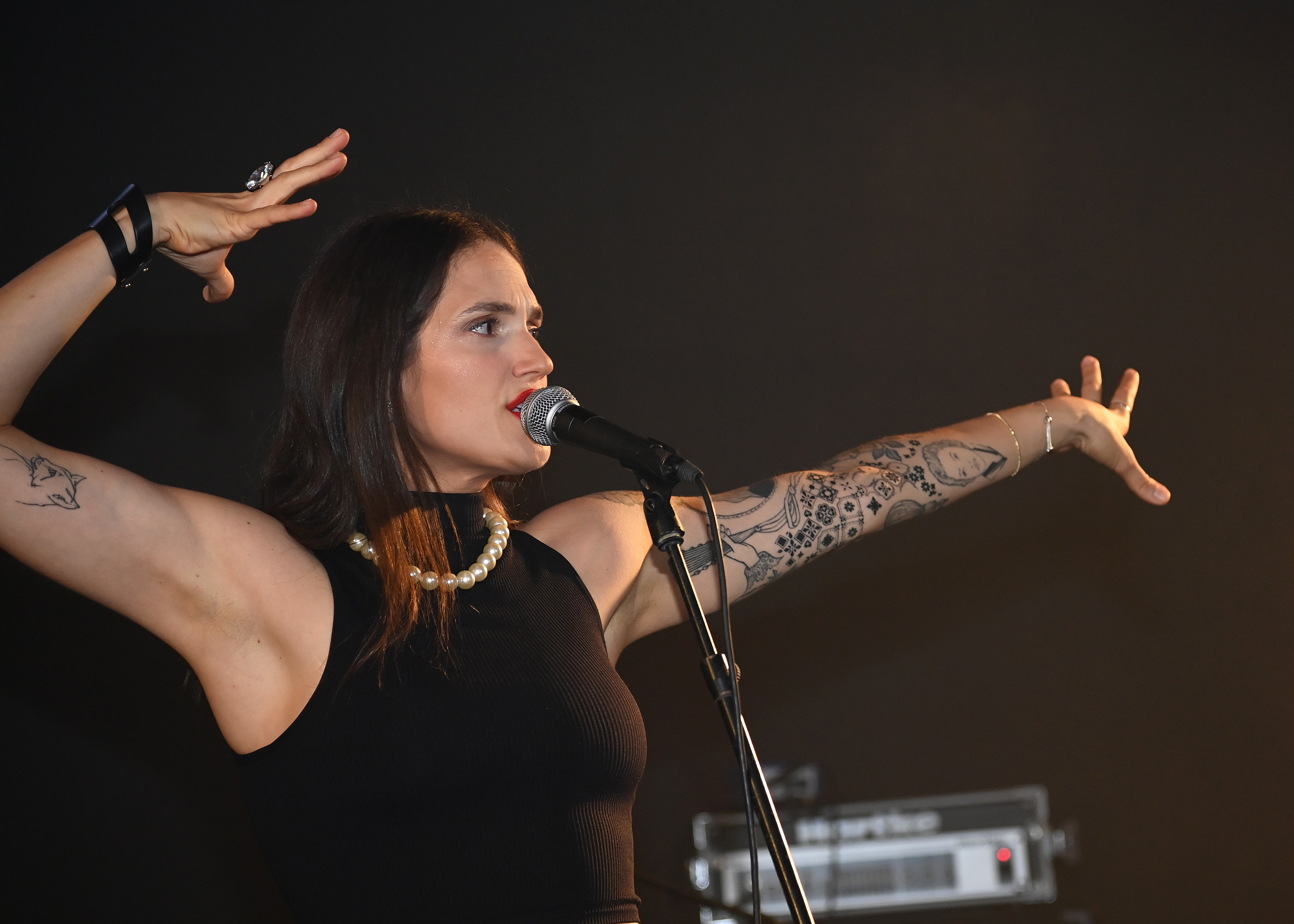
- Blumin in 2022

Background information
- Born: 15 December 1987 (age 38)
- Origin: Dnipropetrovsk, Soviet Union (now Ukraine)
- Genres: Pop
- Occupations: Singer; songwriter; actress
- Years active: 2002–present
- Label: Helicon

Marina Maximilian Blumin (Hebrew: מארינה מקסימיליאן בלומין; born 15 December 1987), known professionally as Marina Maximilian, is an Israeli singer-songwriter and actress. She was the runner-up on the fifth season of the reality music competition show Kokhav Nolad.

== Early life ==
Blumin was born in Dnipropetrovsk, Soviet Union (now Ukraine) on 15 December 1987. At the age of three, she immigrated to Israel with her parents. The family lived with friends in Ramat Gan before settling in the Pardes Katz neighbourhood of Bnei Brak. From a young age, Blumin studied piano with her mother, Ella, a classical pianist, and sang in a choir. She later went to the conservatory where her mother taught.

Blumin graduated from Ironi Alef High School in Tel Aviv. She began performing at jazz clubs at the age of fifteen, after pianist Rick Birman took her under his wing. She performed at the Red Sea Jazz Festival in Eilat and sang with Common Bond, an ethnic-fusion-rock-jazz band, at festivals and clubs.

== Career ==
=== Singing ===
Kokhav Nolad

In 2007, Blumin auditioned for the fifth season of Kokhav Nolad and was accepted. During the show, she mostly sang Israeli pop and folk songs, adding her own jazz nuances. She sang "Halomot" by Ruhama Raz, "Shir Ahuvat HaSapan" by Rita, "Bluz Kna'ani" by Ehud Banai, and "Vidui" by Alexander Penn (sung by Yehudit Ravitz). In the end, Blumin qualified for the final along with Boaz Ma'uda and Shlomi Bar'el, and came in second, with Nurit Galron's "Nifradnu Kakh".

Step into My World and Armonot Ashan

Blumin did not serve in the Israeli Defence Forces and was accused of draft evasion, while in reality, she had received an exemption for mental health reasons; instead, she had volunteered to teach children voice development and singing at the Ben Shemen Youth Village. In April 2008, she held her first solo performance at the Yamei Zemer Festival in Holon, which was managed by Tzedi Tzarfati. In May 2008, she released a duet with Ma'uda called "Mi Haya Ma'amin". The song became a hit in Israel. In June 2008, she released her first solo single, "Sof Sof". In 2012, she contributed vocals to the song "Melting Thoughts" on the Yossi Sassi album Melting Clocks.

Blumin released her first studio album, Step into My World, an English-language pop record that also includes a Russian song, in August 2013. The first single, "Two Pigs", was released in January 2013. A second single, "Tango", came out in April. On 17 September 2014, it was revealed that Israel's Radio 88FM, which oversaw the country's artist selection for the Eurovision Song Contest 2015, had approached Blumin to sing at the event in Vienna, though the deal eventually fell through. In 2016, Blumin released her second studio album, titled ארמונות עשן (Armonot Ashan), this one entirely in Hebrew except for the last track, which is sung in English. She later performed at the opening ceremony of the 2017 Maccabiah Games, on 6 July.

=== Acting ===
As a teenager, Blumin appeared in two Cameri Theater productions: Hanoch Levin's play Requiem at age fifteen and the musical The Producers at age eighteen. She also participated twice in the Acre Festival, where she sang in the play Schmetterling (Farewell, Butterfly), which won first prize in 2005. In 2006, she participated in Rabak and wrote the music for it, receiving honourable mention. She began her television career with a role in the police drama Pillars of Smoke. Most recently, she has starred in the third season of the political thriller Fauda.

== Discography ==
- Step into My World (2013)
- ארמונות עשן (Armonot Ashan) (2016)
- ביחד (Byakhad) (2021)
- Late Bloomer (2022)
- מתוך מופע פסנתר לייב (live, 2024)

== Filmography ==
List of appearances, with year, title, and role shown
Year	Title	Role	Notes
2009	Pillars of Smoke	Bat Kol	1 episode
2009	Weeping Susannah	Shura	3 episodes
2011	Barefoot	Alexandra	6 episodes
2011–12	The First Family	Alin	18 episodes
2019–20	Fauda	Hila Bashan	12 episodes
