= Yehuda Saado =

Israeli musical artist

Yehuda Saado יהודה סעדו
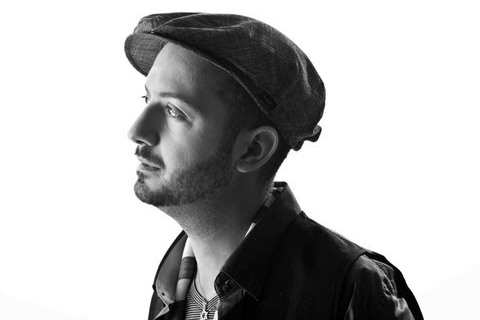

Background information
- Born: April 29, 1983 (age 42); Jerusalem, Israel
- Years active: 2005 – present

Yehuda Saado (also written Sa'ado; Hebrew: יהודה סעדו; born 29 April 1983) is an Israeli singer and the winner of the third season of the Israeli music competition program Kokhav Nolad.

== Career ==
Yehuda Saado, born in Jerusalem was raised in Kiryat Ekron and learned keyboards at a young age. He served in the Israel Air Force at the Tel Nof Airbase as a technician. After release from the Air Force, he studied music at the Rimon School of Jazz and Contemporary Music at Ramat HaSharon.

In 2005, he took part in the third season of Kokhav Nolad, the Israeli equivalent of the Idol series. In the final held on August 29, 2005 in Tel Aviv, Yehuda Saado won the title with the song "Sadot Shel Irusim" written by Shlomo Artzi getting 918,520 votes. The runner-up Michael Kirkilan received only 370,631 votes, and third-placed Shir Biton 322,288 votes. 1.6 million viewers tuned in to watch the final.

In 2006, he released his debut single "Kokhav Nolad" written by Barak Feldman and Yoni Bloch. In 2007, he followed that with his debut album Eirom Bati with most songs composed by Yehuda Saado himself. In 2009, he released a second single entitled "Livkhor BeDerekh" and a follow-up single "BeTzal Dmuta". He also appeared in 2010 with the Ashdod Israeli Andalusian Orchestra.

He took part in the 2023–24 edition of HaKokhav HaBa, used as the Israeli selection for the Eurovision Song Contest 2024, being among the fourteen finalists. He was eliminated during the top 14 round.

== Personal life ==
He has been married to Esther since 2007 and lives in Nir Galim with his wife and five children.

== Discography ==
=== Albums ===
Title and details
Eirom Bati (in Hebrew עירום באתי)
- Type: Album
- Released: 2007
Notes

No.	Title	Length
1.	"Eirom Bati - עירום באתי"	3:53
2.	"Platin Shel Meleh - פלטין של מלך"	3:50
3.	"Meleh BaSade - מלך בשדה"	3:56
4.	"Mamshih BaMirdaf - ממשיך במרדף"	3:43
5.	"Matzhik Midai - מצחיק מידי"	4:12
6.	"Eshet Hail - אשת חיל"	3:38
7.	"Shir Hadash - שיר חדש"	3:41
8.	"Etzli HaLaila Rak Mathil - אצלי הלילה רק מתחיל"	4:13
9.	"Ehzor Maher - אחזור מהר"	4:15
10.	"Zoher BaShnaim Sheli - זוהר בשמיים שלי"	3:46
11.	"Ashrei HaIsh - אשרי האיש"	3:58

=== Singles ===
- 2006: "Kokhav Nolad"
- 2010: "Livkhor BeDerekh"
- 2010: "BeTzal Dmuta"

Awards and achievements
Preceded by Harel Moyal	Kokhav Nolad winner 2005	Succeeded by Jacko Eisenberg
