= Jacko Eisenberg =

Israeli singer

Jacko Eisenberg ג'קו אייזנברג
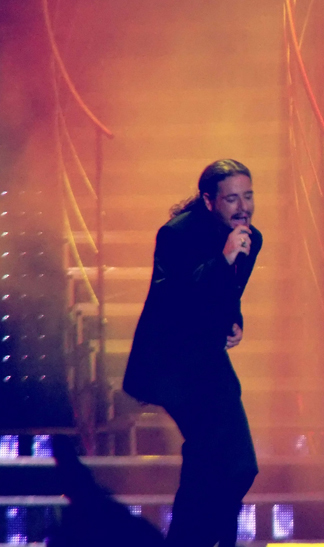

Background information
- Born: November 30, 1980 (age 45)
- Origin: Netanya, Israel
- Genres: Rock; Post-grunge; Pop rock Hip hop
- Years active: 1996–present
- Label: Hed Arzi
- Member of: Jamus

Jacko Eisenberg (Hebrew: ג'קו אייזנברג; born November 30, 1980) is an Israeli singer who won the fourth season of Kochav Nolad, the Israeli version of Pop Idol.

== Biography ==
Eisenberg was born and raised in Netanya, Israel, to Miriam and Robert Eisenberg. When he was 10 years old, his father died of a heart attack. At the age of 13, he started performing at school ceremonies. He graduated from Eldad High School in Netanya and began to play the piano, guitar, drums, and bass. He started touring with Jamus, his hip hop band with Guy Eliahu. He was also supporting himself as a waiter and wedding singer. In 2003, he released the album Sim Tarosh Batsad (Put U'r Head Aside) with Jamus.

Eisenberg declined to serve in the Israeli army, declaring himself a pacifist.

In May 2006, his roommate signed him onto Kochav Nolad, where he won top prize on September 7, besting Maya Rotman and Refael Mirila, singing "Ani Meabed Otakh" (Losing You) and "Nirdam Al Hakholot" (Falling Asleep on the Dunes) with Ninet Tayeb.

=== After Kochav Nolad ===
After winning the Kochav Nolad title, his remarks about avoiding military service and the release of a song he recorded with Jamus, "Medina Zona, Medina Motsetset" (Whore Country, Blowjob Country), aroused military and public objections. He was unofficially banned from many media outlets and disappeared from the public life.

He returned to the Israeli music business in 2007, releasing "Kashe Li Lo Lehitragesh" (It's Hard Not to be Excited) with Maya Rotman for the fifth season of Kochav Nolad. The song became a big hit in Israel, reaching number one in the main charts.

On January 1, 2008, he released an eponymous debut album. The singles from the album were "Shar Shar" (Singing), "Tsoreakh" (Screaming) and "Nirdam Al Hakholot". Commercially, the album was unsuccessful, as only 6,000 copies were sold.

In December 2009, Eisenberg participated in the local children's musical theatre "Aly Bubba v-40 Hagenavim" (Ali Baba and the 40 Thieves), playing the role of King, alongside Miki Kam and Rodrigo Gonzalez.

After an unsuccessful tour for his debut album, in July 2010, Jacko left Israel and lived in Amsterdam for two years. In June 2012, Eisenberg returned to Israel to restart his career. In the next three years, he released three new singles ("Hatchala", "Hafuch Al Hafuch", "Lma At Mechka") which did not air in local radio stations.

Eisenberg participated in Big Brother VIP (Israeli season 4).

== Discography ==
=== Albums ===
with Jamus

- Sim Tarosh Batsad (Put U'r Head Aside) (2003)
- Balagan Baolam (Mess in the World) (2008)

solo

- Jacko Eisenberg (2008)

=== Singles ===
- "Kashe Li Lo Lehitragesh" (It's Hard for Me Not to Get Excited) (2007)
- "Shar Shar" (Sing Sing) (2007)
- "Tsoreakh" (Screaming) (2008)
- "Nirdam Al Hakholot" (Falling Asleep on the Dunes) (2008)
- "Hatkhala" (Start) (2012)
- "Hafukh Al Hafukh" (Twist on a Twist) (2014)
- "Le’ma At Me’khaka" (What Are You Waiting For?) (2015)
- "HaYamim" (The Days) (2019)
- "Lo Moovan Me’elav" (Not Obvious) (2019)
- "BaSof" (In the End) (2020)
- "HaShamaim Lo Yihiyoo Oto Davar" (The Sky Will Never Be the Same) (2021)
- "Levad" (Alone) (2021)
- "Kolot" (Voices) (2021)
- "E’moona" (Faith) (2022)
- "Akhshav" (Now) (2023)
- "Sofer" (I'm counting) (2023)
- "Kol Yom She’Over" (Every Day That Passes) (2024)

Awards and achievements
Preceded by Yehuda Saado	Kokhav Nolad winner 2006	Succeeded by Boaz Ma'uda
