= Tzedi Tzarfati =

Israel television presenter (born 1941)

- צדי צרפתי
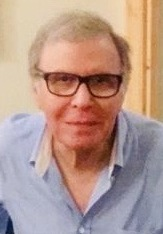
- Born: Zadok Zarfati; 16 January 1941 (age 85); Tel Aviv, British Mandate of Palestine

Tzedi Tzarfati (Hebrew: צדי צרפתי (help), also transliterated as Tsadi Tsarfati, Tsedi Sarfati, or Tzedi Zarfati, Sadi Sarfati, and Tsedi Tsorfati; born 16 January 1941) is an Israeli television presenter, director, and actor.

== Early and personal life ==
Tzedi Tzarfati was born Zadok Zarfati in Tel Aviv, present-day Israel, on 16 January 1941. He is of Bulgarian and Greek descent and grew up in the Old North area of Tel Aviv with his father after his parents divorced shortly after his birth. His father remarried when Tzarfati was five, and he considers his stepmother to be his real mother, as he connected with her more than his biological mother. He has two younger siblings from his father and stepmother.

He is gay and had to live closeted in Tel Aviv growing up, before it developed LGBTQ+ culture. In his Israel Defense Forces service he was assigned to an entertainment role in Central Command and was threatened by superiors when they suspected he was gay; they used slurs to interrogate him, leading him to retreat further from a gay identity. He came out when he started directing, saying he wanted to be himself; shortly after he did so, he was beaten by a gang with a dog and left for dead. Though he came out to be comfortable in himself, he has expressed uncertainty about the cultural concept of coming out and whether it is necessary, also telling Haaretz that he did not make any public declaration when he did come out as he wanted to be seen as a director before a gay man or a "gay director". When he became a judge on Kokhav Nolad, he became much more prominent, and Tzarfati's sexuality became a public debate; he was displeased with the media response, feeling insulted at the characterisation that he was only coming out as an old man.

== Career ==
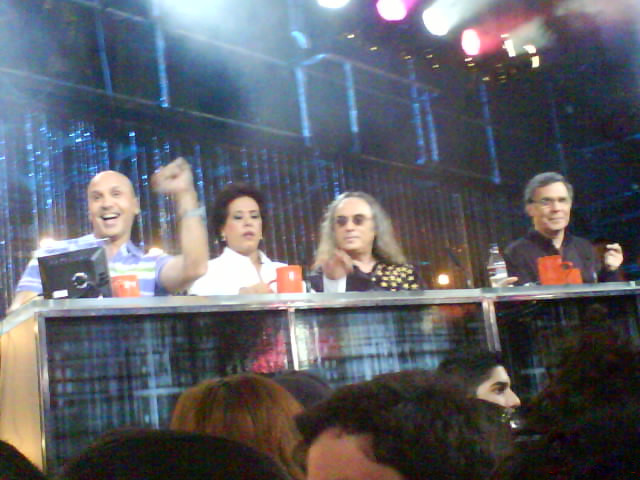
Tzarfati (right) at the judging table on Kokhav Nolad

Tzarfati began his career acting when he was 10, performing with the Israeli National Theatre. The last show he performed in was Hair with Svika Pick in the early 1970s; after it, singer Chava Alberstein asked him to direct a show, and "all of a sudden [his] life changed". He decided to become a director of theatre and televised performances. He had not felt comfortable to be out while working in theatre, due to internalised homophobia and a masculine culture among male performers behind the scenes that he did not feel included him, and came out when he left acting. The musical Bustan Sefaradi, which Tzarfati directed, ran for over 2,300 shows over almost 20 years at the Habima Theatre. He directed many of the Israel Eurovision Song Contest entries in the 1980s and 1990s, and he was director of the Eurovision Song Contest 1999 in Jerusalem.

The Idol franchise started in Israel in 2002 as Kokhav Nolad, and Tzarfati joined as one of the judges in 2004. Compared to Simon Cowell, The Jerusalem Post said the Israeli judging panel were nice to the contestants. Tzarfati has said that he went into reality television for the money, and in 2014 opined that there is no depth to the shows he judges on, purely intending to keep viewers watching for ratings and so profit.

Though he does not know Yiddish, he directed a 2014 Yiddishpiel production of The Government Inspector starring Mike Burstyn and a cast of predominantly young Russian actors. He also directed a 101 Dalmatians musical starring Dana International and Duo Datz and began judging on a Dana International-fronted reality competition show to form a new girl group.

In 2016 he directed a production of West Side Story in Tel Aviv, with the Jets as Ashkenazim and the Sharks as Mizrahim, and in 2018 he directed a revival of Annie in Israel, saying he had seen it on Broadway about 35 years earlier and was so moved by the song "Tomorrow" that he performed the song as much as possible, but also wanted to bring the whole show and its message of optimism to audiences. In a review for BroadwayWorld, Ofek Levy said that the show was "both passionately directed and passionately acted". He was nominated for a BroadwayWorld Israel award for directing it.

Tzarfati is one of the judges on The Singer in the Mask, the Israeli iteration of the Masked Singer franchise. It began airing in 2020 and receives a large share of timeslot viewership. In April 2020, he directed a rock opera version of Swan Lake at the off-Broadway St. Luke's Theatre.
