= Kokhav Nolad 10 =

- Season 10
- Starring: Tzvika Hadar; Moshe Peretz; Tsedi Tzarfati; Miri Messika; Gidi Gov

Release
- Original network: Keshet
- Original release: May 20 – September 4, 2012

Season chronology
- ← Previous; Kokhav Nolad 9

Kokhav Nolad 10 is the tenth season of the reality show Kokhav Nolad, which focuses on finding the next Israeli pop star. It was hosted by Tzvika Hadar with judges Miri Messika, Tsedi Tzarfati and the newest Moshe Peretz and Gidi Gov. The final of Kokhav Nolad 10 took place in Haifa on September 4, 2012.

== Participants ==
Men	Women
Itan Grinberg (18, Givatayim) - Runner up	Tal Trabelsi (17, Tzfat) - 17th Eliminated
Ran Shafir (18, Rosh Ha'ayin) - 20th Eliminated	Anna Eckhard (19, Tel Aviv) - 18th Eliminated
Hemi Ben David (23, Sdei Hemed) - 3rd Eliminated	Shiran Asaf (18, Holon) - 13th Eliminated
Sahar Twito (20, Jaffa) - 11th Eliminated	Adi Argelazi (22, Tel Aviv) - 14th Eliminated
Kobi Tamim (18, Lod) - 12th Eliminated	Hen Froymovich (18, Modi'in) - 9th Eliminated
Gil Nagar (20, Rosh Ha'ayin) - 2nd Eliminated	Sharon Kidushin (19, Kiryat Bialik) - 23rd Eliminated
Asaf Berman (19, Rishon LeZion) - 7th Eliminated	Linoy Akala (21, Tzofim) - 22nd Eliminated
Or Taragan (17, Herzliya) - Winner	Tom Cohen (20, Nesher) - 15th Eliminated
Or Ben Baruch (17, Dimona) - 8th/19th Eliminated	Hadar Amram (16, Yagel) - 21st Eliminated
Boaz Krauzer (17, Tel Aviv) - 10th Eliminated	Haviva Markovich (19, Nahariya) - 1st Eliminated
	Sapir Messika (17, Ashdod) - 4th Eliminated
	Anita Gassin (16, Migdal HaEmek) - 3rd Place
	Noam Frank (18, Tel Aviv) - 5th Eliminated
	Rimon Karmi (19, Rishon LeZion) - 6th Eliminated
