= Pablo Rosenberg =

Argentine-Israeli singer and musician (born 1965)

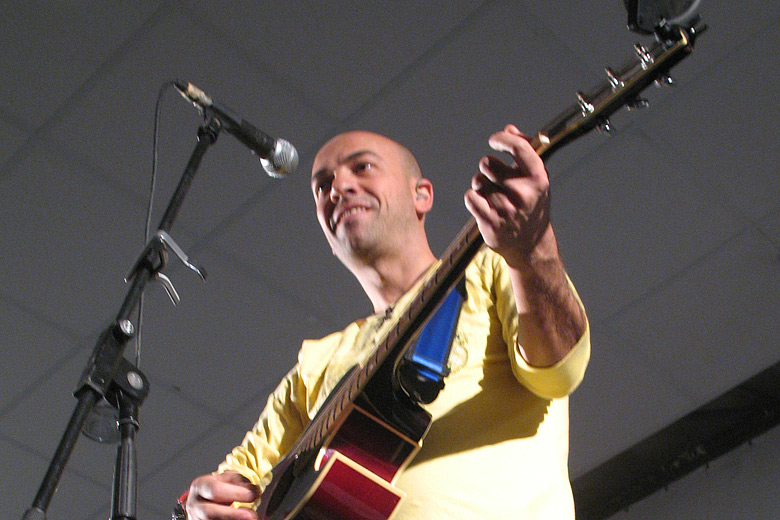
Pablo Rosenberg in concert

Pablo Rosenberg (Hebrew: פבלו רוזנברג; born April 6, 1965) is an Argentine-Israeli singer and musician.

Pablo Rosenberg was born in Argentina in 1965. His family immigrated to Israel when he was six years old. He joined the Israeli hard rock band Stella Maris. In 2010, he joined the judging panel of Kochav Nolad, the Israeli version of American Idol.

In 2023, he started serving as a presenter of Bank Leumi together with Gal Toren.

== Personal life ==
Rosenberg married talent agent Naomi Alsheikh in 1991, and they had twins, Michael and Amalia, who were born in 1998. They divorced in 2005. In November 2020, Alsheikh took her own life after years of struggling with depression.

In 2009, Rosenberg married for the second time to model Miri Levi, and in 2013 their daughter Bar was born. On April 24, 2022 it was published that the two had separated.

His younger brother Shmulik Rosenberg was married to singer and actress Sharon Haziz.

Rosenberg defines himself as an atheist, and as someone who suffered from panic attacks for several years.

Rosenberg resides in Tel Aviv.

== Discography ==
- Our World
- The Best of the Best
- The Best of Shlomi Shabat and Pablo Rosenberg
- Live in Caesarea
- The Collection
- Every Day More
- Twilight
- Only the Heart Knows

== See also ==
- Music of Israel
- List of Argentine Jews
- Israeli rock
