= Kokhav Nolad 9 =

Israeli reality TV show season

- Season 9
- Starring: Tzvika Hadar; Margalit Tzan'ani; Tsedi Tzarfati; Miri Messika; Yair Nitzani

Release
- Original network: Keshet
- Original release: April 2 – July 23, 2011

Season chronology
- ← Previous; Kokhav Nolad 8 Next → Kokhav Nolad 10

Kokhav Nolad 9 is the 9th season of the popular reality TV show Kokhav Nolad, which focused on finding the next Israeli pop star. It is hosted by Tzvika Hadar with judges Margalit Tzan'ani, Tsedi Tzarfati and the Newest Miri Messika and Yair Nitzani. Rather than in Jerusalem as in the previous season, the final of Kochav Nolad 9 took place in Haifa in July 2011.

== Participants ==
| Men | Women |
|---|---|
| Asaf Shalm And Nadav Hoffman (31, Tel Aviv) - Eliminated | Ortal Adri (23, Ramat Gan) - Eliminated |
| Erez Shmueli (44, Jerusalem) - Eliminated | Vered Mushkeovsky (22, Holon) - Eliminated |
| David Lavi (22, Jerusalem) - Runner up | Hagit Yasou (21, Sderot) -Winner |
| Dudi Bar David (27, Lod) - Eliminated | Yelena Ilayeieve (16.5, Dimona) - Eliminated |
| Yosi Asher (22, Ganei Tikva) - Eliminated | Liron Itzkovich (20, Nazareth Illit) - Eliminated |
| Lidor Sultan (17, Be'er Yaakov) - Eliminated | Mali Shalom (27, Herzliya) - Eliminated |
| Liron Ramati (30, Tel Aviv) - Eliminated | Meshi Hazizah (17, Sderot) - Eliminated |
| Noy Danan (16.5, Eilat) - Eliminated | Naama Cohen (25, Kiryat Motzkin) - Eliminated |
| Idan Haim (23, Ashdod) - Eliminated | Clara Savag (16, Bat Yam) - Eliminated |
| Zion Khoury (27, Tel Aviv) - Eliminated | Tamar Yahalomi (16.5, Holon) - Quit |
| Ron Weinreich (25, Ramat Hasharon) - Eliminated | Keren Cohen (32, Petah Tikva) - Eliminated |
| Roey Avital (27, Haifa) - Eliminated | |
| Rotem Cohen (23, Ashdod) - Eliminated | |
