= Israel Bar-On =

Israeli singer (born 1989)

Israel Bar-On ישראל בר-און
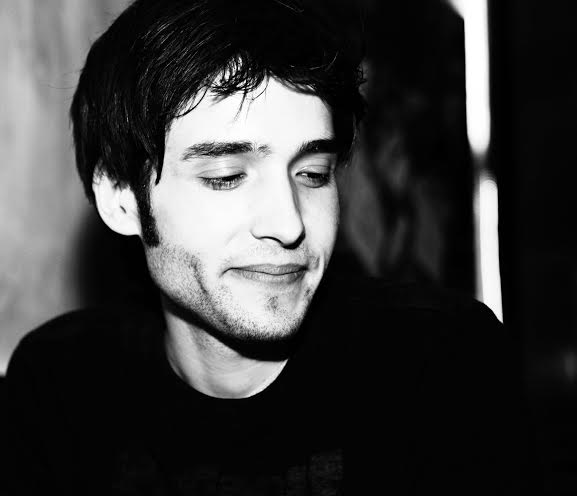
- Israel Bar-On

Background information
- Born: January 31, 1989 (age 37); Beersheba, Israel
- Occupation: Singer
- Years active: 2008–present
- Awards: Winner of Kokhav Nolad 6 (2008)

Israel Bar-On (Hebrew: ישראל בר-און; born January 31, 1989) is an Israeli singer. He won Israel's Kokhav Nolad (A Star is Born) song contest in 2008.

== Biography ==
Israel Bar-On was born in Beersheba to a religious family.

In August 2008, he won the final of the Kokhav Nolad 6 contest with 56% of the votes. For the show's finale, he performed an autobiographical song about his new life without parents and religion.

On October 16, 2019, it was revealed that he is coping with bipolar disorder.

== Personal life ==
In 2012, Bar-On married Noya Granot. The couple were married until 2020 and have one child together. In 2024, he married Noa Livneh.

Awards and achievements
Preceded by Boaz Ma'uda	Kokhav Nolad winner 2008	Succeeded by Roni Dalumi
