= Synergia =

Synergia סינרגיה
- Origin: Tel Aviv, Israel
- Genre: Rock
- Years active: 2002–present
- Label: Hed Artzi
- Members: Ron Hoffman - vocals, piano Roy Geffen - guitar, vocals Iron Shabtai - bass Benua Nachaisi - guitar Tomer Maizner - drums
- Past members: Ariel "Bibs" Branson; Ori Raz; Eitan Raz
- Website: http://www.synergia.co.il

Synergia (Hebrew: סינרגיה, "synergy") is an Israeli rock band. The band was first formed by two childhood friends Ron Hoffman (keyboard) and Roy Geffen (guitar). The two used to perform as a cover group in Tel Aviv called "HaTzayadim" (The Hunters). Later on, the two joined forces with guitar player Ariel "Bibs" Branson, drummer Ori Raz (later on to be replaced by Banua Nachaisi and Eitan Raz, respectively) and bass player Iron Shabtai.

The band's first radio hit in Israel was a cover song for another Israeli musician, Shlomo Artzi, though their first album, "Tzo'akim al Ahavah" (Screaming about Love) that year received little success. Yet, their second album, "Margish Acher" (Feeling Different), gained the band the status of one of the leading rock groups in Israel, practically overnight. From this 2006 album the band produced many instant radio hits, most notably "Tir'i Zeh Ani" (Look, It's Me), "Margish Acher" and "Ashem" (Guilty). The album went gold after selling over 20,000 copies.

In 2006 the band won several awards, amongst them "Group of the Year" from Israeli music channel Music 24 and both major popular music radio stations: Reshet Gimel (Kol Yisrael) and Galgalatz. The song "Tir'i Zeh Ani" of their second album was also named as "Song of the Year" by Galgalatz.

== Discography ==
- 2005 - "Tzo'akim al Ahavah" (Screaming about Love)
- 2006 - "Margish Acher" (Feeling Different)
- 2008 - "Hishtakfut" (Reflection)
- 2009 - "Synergia Akustit - Im Rami Kleinstein" (Synergia Unplugged - feat. Rami Kleinstein)
- 2011 - "Chatum ba'Esh" (Signed in the Fire)
