= Boaz Ma'uda =

Israeli singer-songwriter (born 1987)

Boaz Mauda בועז מעודה

Background information
- Born: Boaz Ma'uda; April 23, 1987 (age 39); Elyakim, Israel
- Genres: Mizrahi, Ethnic, acoustic
- Occupation: Singer
- Years active: 2007–present

Boaz Ma'uda (Hebrew: בועז מעודה; born April 23, 1987) is an Israeli singer and songwriter. He won the fifth season of Kokhav Nolad, the Israeli version of Pop Idol, and represented Israel in the Eurovision Song Contest 2008, finishing in 9th place.

== Early life ==
Boaz was born and raised in moshav Elyakim, where he still lives. He is the youngest son of his mother, who became disabled from complications of his birth. He is of Yemenite Jewish descent.

== Career ==
=== Kochav Nolad ===
Without any history in the music industry, and unknown to Boaz, he was signed up by a friend for the auditions of the fifth season of Kochav Nolad. During the show, Boaz sang many Mizrahi and acoustic songs. His voice was loved by the audience and judges.

At the finals on August 29, 2007, Boaz competed against Marina Maximillian Blumin and Shlomi Bar'el. On that evening, he performed two songs: "Señorita" with veteran Israeli singer David Broza, and then Avner Gadassi's "Menagen veshar" ("Playing and Singing"). He won Kochav Nolad 2007 with 50% of the votes. In addition, he won a contract with the label Hed Artzi.

==== Kohav Nolad performances ====
Week #	Song Choice	Original Artist	Result
Top 20	"Yad anuga"	Avner Gadassi	Safe
Top 18	"Neshel hanachash"	Meir Ariel	Safe
Top 16	"HaShir al ha'aretz" (duet with Arlene Gould)	Nurit Galron	Got a resistance
Top 14	"Khayekha vekhayay" (duet with Eden Amzaleg)	Boaz Sharabi	Bottom 2 in duets
Top 14 – Rescue solo	"Shi'ur moledet"	Hava Alberstein	Safe
Top 13	"Erev shel yom bahir"	Efraim Shamir	Safe
Top 12	"Ani shuv mit'ahev" (Duet with Shlomi Bar'el)	Gidi Gov	Safe
Top 12 – Rescue solo	"Yare'akh kakhol"	Gan Hayot Band	Safe
Top 11	"Ahavat khayay"	Haim Moshe	Safe
Top 10	"At li layla" (duet with Daniel Ben Hayim)	Boaz Sharabi	Bottom 3 in duets
Top 10 – Rescue solo	"Kol galgal"	Shotei Hanevuah	Safe
Top 9	"Maka Afora"	Monica Sex	Safe
Top 8	"Al tikh'asi, ze lo ason"	Gesher HaYarkon trio	Safe
Top 7	"Yalduti hashnyia"	Matti Caspi	Safe
Top 7	"Homot heimar"	Margalit Tzan'ani	Safe
Top 3 (Semi-final 2)	"Mizmor layla" and "Etslekh ba'olam"	"Mizmor layla" – Noa; "Etslekh ba'olam" – Evyatar Banai	Final qualifier
Finale	"Señorita" and "Menagen veshar"	"Señorita" – David Broza; "Menagen veshar" – Avner Gadassi.	Winner

=== Eurovision Song Contest ===
Boaz Mauda 2026

On November 14, the Israel Broadcasting Authority and Israel's Channel 2 announced that Boaz Ma'uda was chosen to represent his country at the Eurovision Song Contest 2008 in Belgrade, Serbia.

The pre-selection occurred in February 2008 in which Ma'uda sang five songs, and the audience, together with a jury of Israeli experts, voted for the winning song which was Ke'ilu Kan – a song written by Israel's Eurovision winner Dana International.

Ma'uda participated in the first semi-finals of the Eurovision Song Contest on May 20, 2008. He ended 5th in the semi-finals and was awarded a spot in the final on May 24, 2008 where he ended 9th with 124 points.

In 2009 he participated in the series Johnny Hollywood playing the famous singer Izhar Cohen, and in August the same year he began his tour of Israel.

=== Discography ===
- (August 3, 2008) – Ma'uda released his first single, "Oreakh baolam" [A guest in the world] for what would be his debut album, titled "Boaz Ma'uda," as the singer; this song is written by composer Keren Peles.
- (March 2009) – he released his second single, also by Peles, "Lakhzor Ha-baita" ("Return home"). He published the song "Time to Pray" with singer Sirusho (Armenian representative in the Eurovision Song Contest in 2008, which ranked fourth) and the singer Jelena Tomasevic (Serbia representative in the Eurovision Song Contest which was in sixth place).
- (July 7, 2009) – his first studio album, titled "Boaz Ma'uda". This album contains 11 songs, with five titles not previously released: "Mah Yafu", "Better Days," "She-tishaer", and "Ausencia" (Spanish: "absence"). The song "Sha'ar libech" ("The gate to your (f.) heart") is a cover of fellow Eurovision 2008 singer Olta Boka's Albanian entry Zemrën e lamë peng.
- (2011) – he released one single called "Yeled hasade" ("Child of the field") a cover of a famous Israeli song. This cover was recorded to a daily drama series called "Alifim", based on a famous Israeli book. In April the same year he released a new song "Shniya Ve'od Ahat" from his second album which he is currently working.

== Personal life ==
Ma'uda still lives with his family in Elyakim.

== Singles ==
Year	Song	English Translation	Creator	ISR
2007	"Menagen Veshar"	Playing and Singing	Avner Gadasi	-
2008	"Keilu Kan"	As If Here	Dana International	1
2008	"Mi Haya Ma'amin?" (with Marina Maximillian Blumin)	Who Would Believe?	Keren Peles	4
2008	"Oreakh BaOlam"	A Guest in the World	Keren Peles	1
2009	"Lakhzor HaBaita"	Return Home	Keren Peles	-
2009	"Time To Pray" (with Sirusho and Jelena Tomašević)	-	Shimon Peres and Boaz Mauda	-
2011	"Shniya Ve'od Ahat"	One second and another	Natan Goshen	-

Awards and achievements
Preceded by Jacko Eisenberg	Kokhav Nolad winner 2007	Succeeded by Israel Bar-On
Preceded by Teapacks with Push the Button	Israel in the Eurovision Song Contest; 2008	Succeeded by Noa & Mira Awad with There Must Be Another Way
