= Miriam Toukan =

Arab-Israeli singer from I'billin

Miriam Toukan مريم طوقان
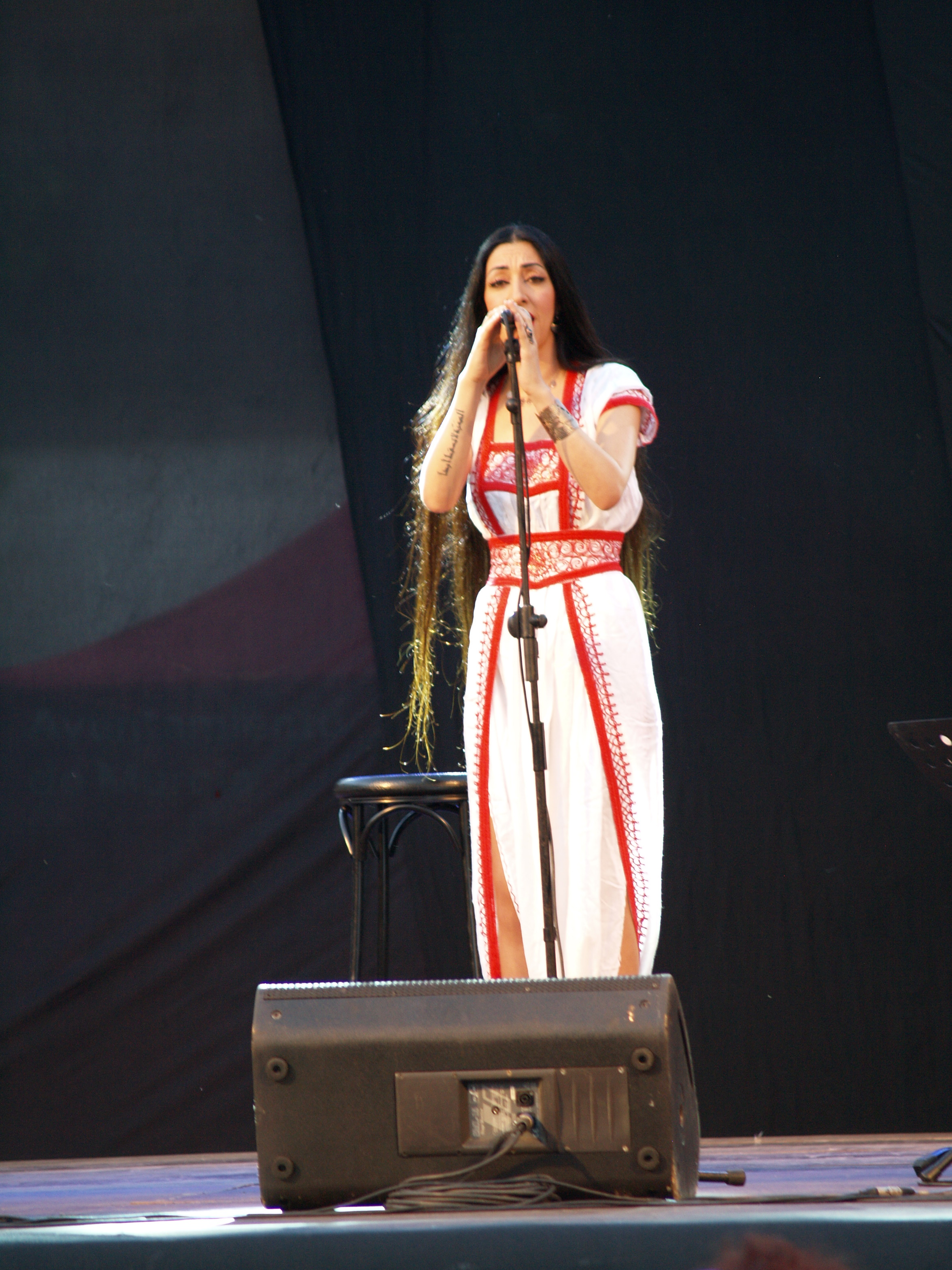

Background information
- Born: Miriam Toukan; I'billin, Israel
- Occupations: Singer, composer, lawyer, and peace activist

Miriam Toukan (also Miriam Tukan, Arabic: مريم طوقان) is a Palestinian singer, and an Arab citizen of Israel.

== Singing career ==
Born into a Palestinian Christian family in I'billin, she has performed at festivals including the Cyprus Rialto World Music Festival, and her project Quartetoukan. She has also participated in marches for peace with other women singers and activists in Spain, Germany, Brazil, and Italy.

In 2007, Toukan participated in the singing reality show Kokhav Nolad 5. She was the first Arab contestant to appear on the show. Toukan finished the competition in ninth place.

In 2012, she performed an Arabic version of Fun's song "We Are Young". From 2013 to the present, she is the leader of Quartetoukan, a musical project that aims to unite cultures and people through music.

In 2022, Toukan performed at a regional cooperation festival in Morocco. She sang in Arabic, Hebrew and Spanish, and was supported by a quartet that played Klezmer instrumentals.

== Social activism ==
Toukan is a member of various movements for the advancement of peace in the Middle East and the end of the Israeli-Palestinian conflict, such as Combatants for Peace and Women Wage Peace. Toucan participated in several peace marches in various countries with the Women Wage Peace, and sang in Arabic the song "Mother's Prayer" which became the movement's anthem.

== Discography ==
- 2008: Christmas Eve
- 2011: Miriam Toukan
