= Gal Uchovsky =

Israeli screenwriter, journalist and film producer

Gal Uchovsky גל אוחובסקי
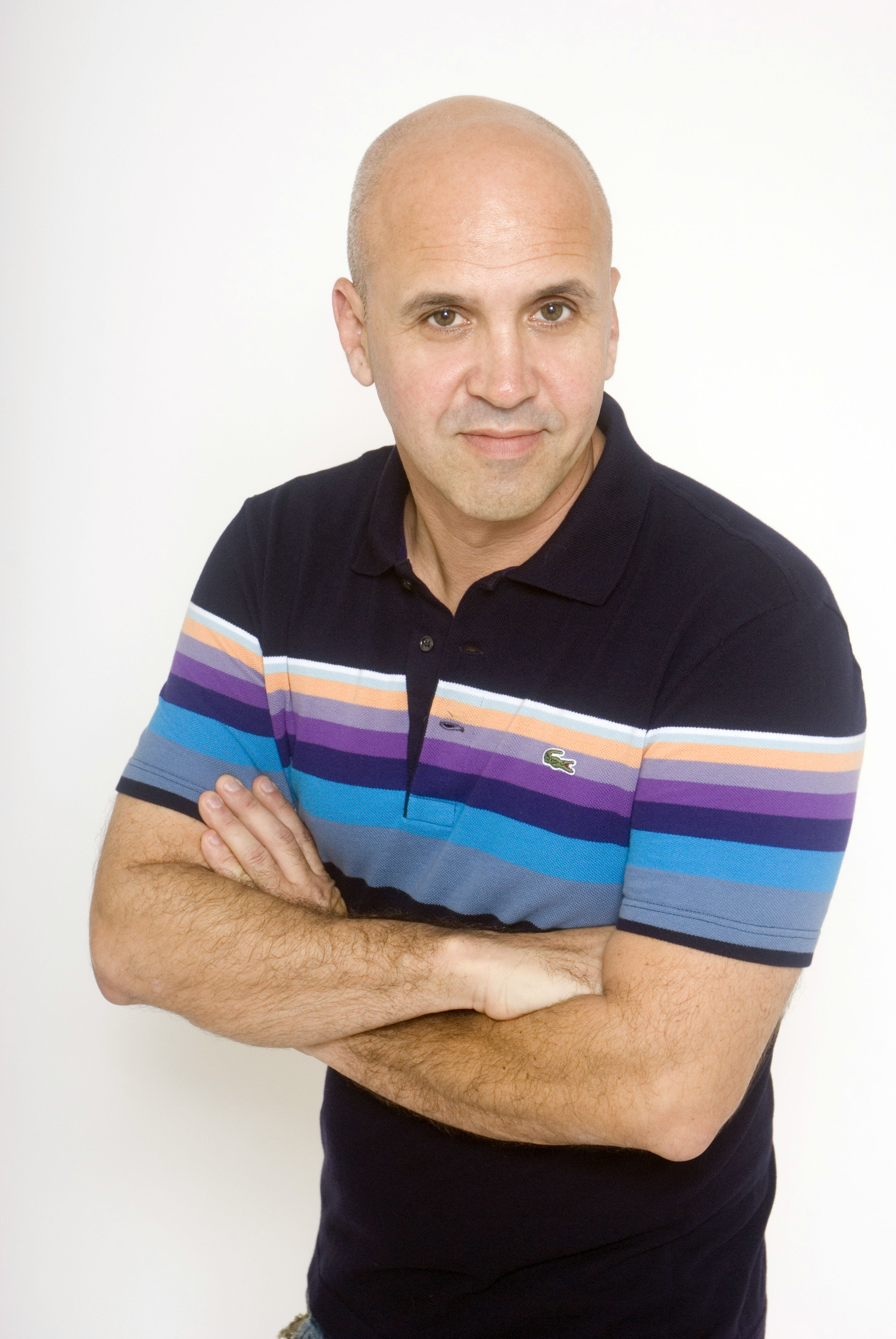
- Born: September 27, 1958 (age 67); Hadera, Israel
- Occupations: Film producer, screenwriter, journalist
- Partner: Eytan Fox

Gal Uchovsky (Hebrew: גל אוחובסקי; born September 27, 1958) is an Israeli screenwriter, producer, journalist, activist and Israeli TV personality.

== Early life ==
Uchovsky was born in Hadera. His family moved to Vienna while his father was studying there. They returned to Hadera when he was five-years-old. He attended high school at the Pardes Hana Agricultural High School. In his youth he excelled in sports and even played for a short time for Maccabi Pardes Katz ^{[clarification needed]}. At the age of 14, he was registered twice on the team's squad and appeared once on the field. He started his military service in a pilot 's course for the first 11 months.

After his military service he lived in Tel Aviv and studied photography at the Camera Obscura school as well as law at Tel Aviv University. Worked for seven years as a flight attendant at El Al.

== Career ==
=== Journalist ===
In 1983, while still a student, Uchovsky was one of the three publishers of the humor magazine "Tick in the Mind." He then wrote for the Ha-Ir as a columnist and culture editor and later editor.

In 1993, he began working for Maariv where he served as a music reporter and culture editor.

=== Film producer ===
Uchovsky worked on the soundtrack to Eytan Fox's film Shirat Ha'Sirena (Siren's Song, 1994). In 1997 he wrote a third of the episodes of the first season of Fox's TV series Florentine. In 1998 he wrote his first feature script for the TV drama Baal Baal Lev, which was directed by Fox.

In 2002, he co-produced the Fox film Yossi & Jagger.

In 2004, he wrote and produced the Fox movie Walk on Water.

In 2005, Ohovsky co-created with Fox The Bubble.

=== TV presenter ===
In 1993, he hosted "Lila Rock" on Channel 3.

In 1997, he began hosting the cultural program "The Small Circle " on Channel 2.

From 2006-2010, he was part of the judging panel of Kohav Nolad.

In 2009, he hosted Soundtrack of the Decade on Channel 24.

In 2010, he co-hosted Gal and Margul.

In 2011, he co-hosted Gal and Eliraz.

In 2012, he hosted the current affairs program "What are you saying?" and hosted the interview program Paskol Chai and also began serving as a judge on the reality show "Eyal Golan is calling you."

In 2015, he participated in the third season of Golstar.

In June 2019, he began hosting 24 at Tsehriim.

In May 2020, he wrote and co-directed the docu-series The Proud Revolution.

== Awards and recognition ==
Uchovsky won "Best Screenwriter" award at the Durban International Film Festival for the film The Bubble.

== Personal life ==
Gal Uchovsky has lived in Tel Aviv with Eytan Fox since 1988.

Uchovsky is a co-founder and served as president of Israel Gay Youth (IGY) and Uchovsky took an active role in Tel Aviv Pride Parade. He co-hosted the first-ever Miss Trans Israel in 2016.

In November 2021, police opened an investigation into accusations of sexual assault levelled against Uchovsky after an investigation from the Israeli Public Broadcasting Corporation published testimonies of two people who accused Uchovsky of sexual misconduct. In response to the exposé, Uchovsky stepped down as president of Israel Gay Youth. In July 2022, police closed the case with no charges filed. After interviews with both Uchovsky and the accusers police determined that no laws were broken.

== Filmography ==
- 1994: Shirat Ha'Sirena (English title Siren's Song) - music consultant
- 1997: Florentin - screenwriter (TV series)
- 1997: Ba'al Ba'al Lev - screenwriter
- 2002: Yossi & Jagger - producer, music consultant
- 2004: Walk on Water - producer, screenwriter
- 2006: The Bubble - producer, screenwriter

Appearances

- 2009: Gay Days, documentary by Yair Qedar

== See also ==
- Television in Israel
- Israeli cinema
