= Svika Pick =

Israeli musician and composer (1949–2022)

- צביקה פיק
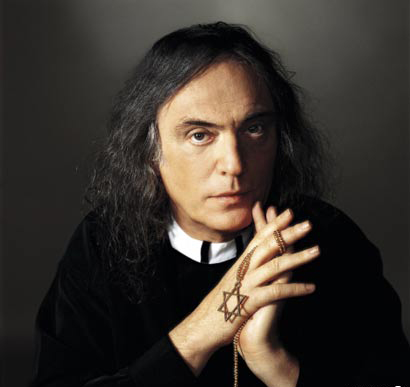
- Pick in 2009
- Born: Henryk Pick; 3 October 1949; Wrocław, Poland
- Died: 14 August 2022 (aged 72); Ramat HaSharon, Israel
- Other name: The Maestro
- Education: Conservatory of Ramat Gan
- Occupations: Singer; songwriter; composer; television personality
- Years active: 1966–2022
- Spouse: Mirit Shem-Ur (m. 1970; div. 1995)
- Partner: Shira Manor (2004–2021)
- Children: 5, including Daniella
- Relatives: Quentin Tarantino (son-in-law)
- Musical career
- Origin: Ramat Gan, Israel
- Genres: Pop; rock; disco; Eurodance

Svika Pick (Hebrew: צביקה פיק, born Henryk Pick; also Tzvika Pik, Tsvika Pick, Zwika Pick, 3 October 1949 – 14 August 2022) was an Israeli singer, songwriter, composer, and television personality.

Pick first gained traction on a national level after playing a lead part in an Israeli version of the musical Hair, later pursuing a prolific songwriting and singing career. He later gained recognition after co-writing "Diva", which won the Eurovision Song Contest 1998 for Israel. Pick was described by peers and critics as the Israeli King of Pop, and the Maestro.

== Biography ==
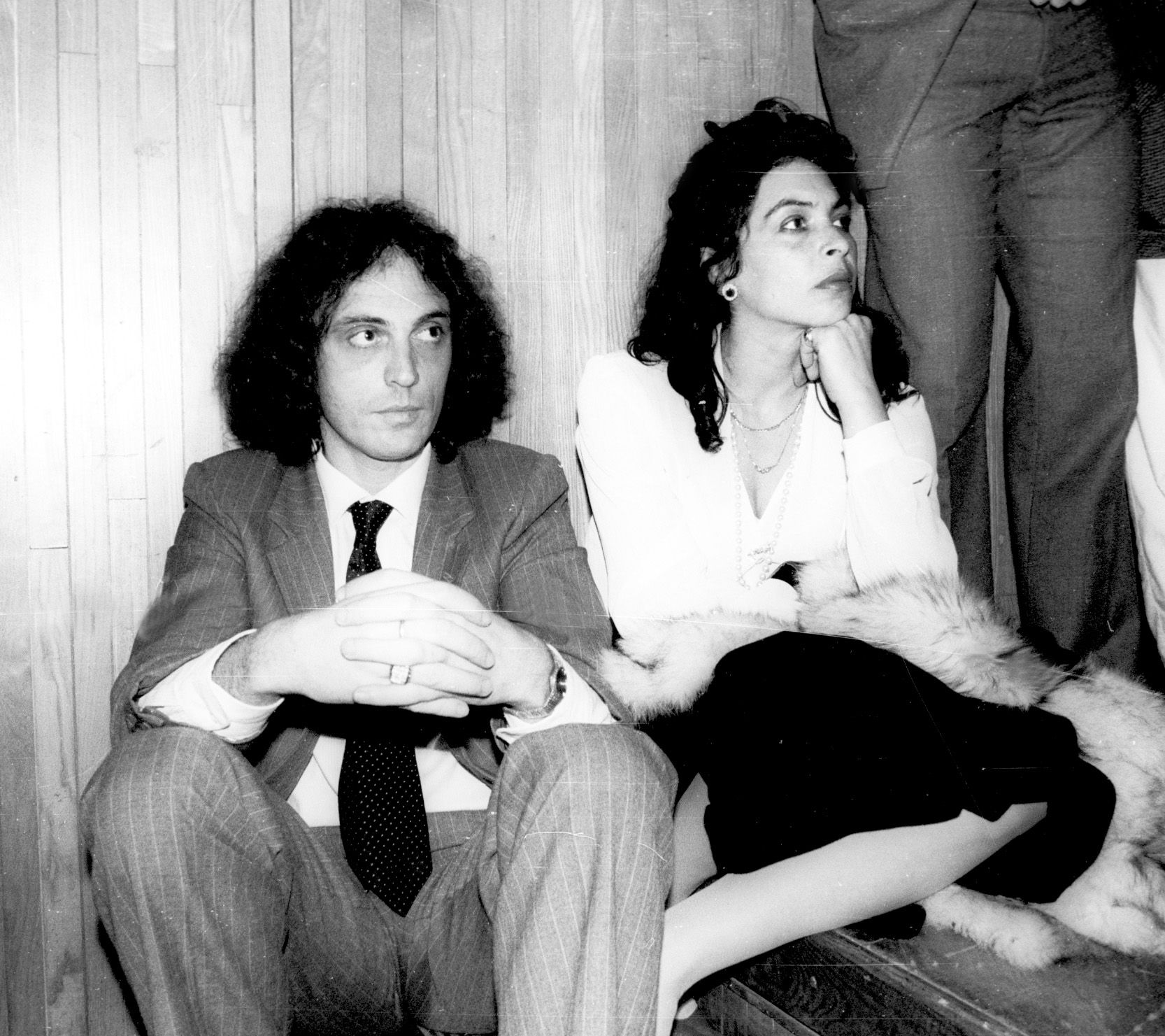
Pick with his first wife Mirit Shem-Ur, 1986

Henryk (Zvi) Pick was born in Wrocław, Poland, to Jewish parents, Paulina (1930–2010) and Borys Pick. His grandfather was the head of a music school, and his uncle was a music professor. At the age of five, Pick studied classical music. In 1957, his family immigrated to Israel. Pick studied music at the conservatory of Ramat Gan, and started to perform in local Israeli rock bands at the age of 15.

Pick married Israeli songwriter Mirit Shem-Ur, with whom he has a son, and two daughters; Sharona and Daniella, who have performed together as the Pick Sisters. Shem-Or wrote the lyrics for many of Pick's hits, including "Mary Lou", which was about her. After they divorced, they continued to collaborate artistically. Sharona is married to Israeli hotelier Daniel Federmann, son of businessman Michael Federmann, while Daniella is married to the American filmmaker Quentin Tarantino.

Pick was also in a relationship with Israeli fashion designer Shira Manor, with whom he had two sons, Tim and Neal.

In the 1980s, Pick played football for Hapoel Yehud and Hapoel Nir Ramat HaSharon.

In 2018, EL AL flight from London to Tel Aviv was diverted to Vienna after Pick suffered a stroke. He later stated that he had to go extensive rehabilitation afterwards, including relearning Hebrew and his ability to walk.

== Music career ==
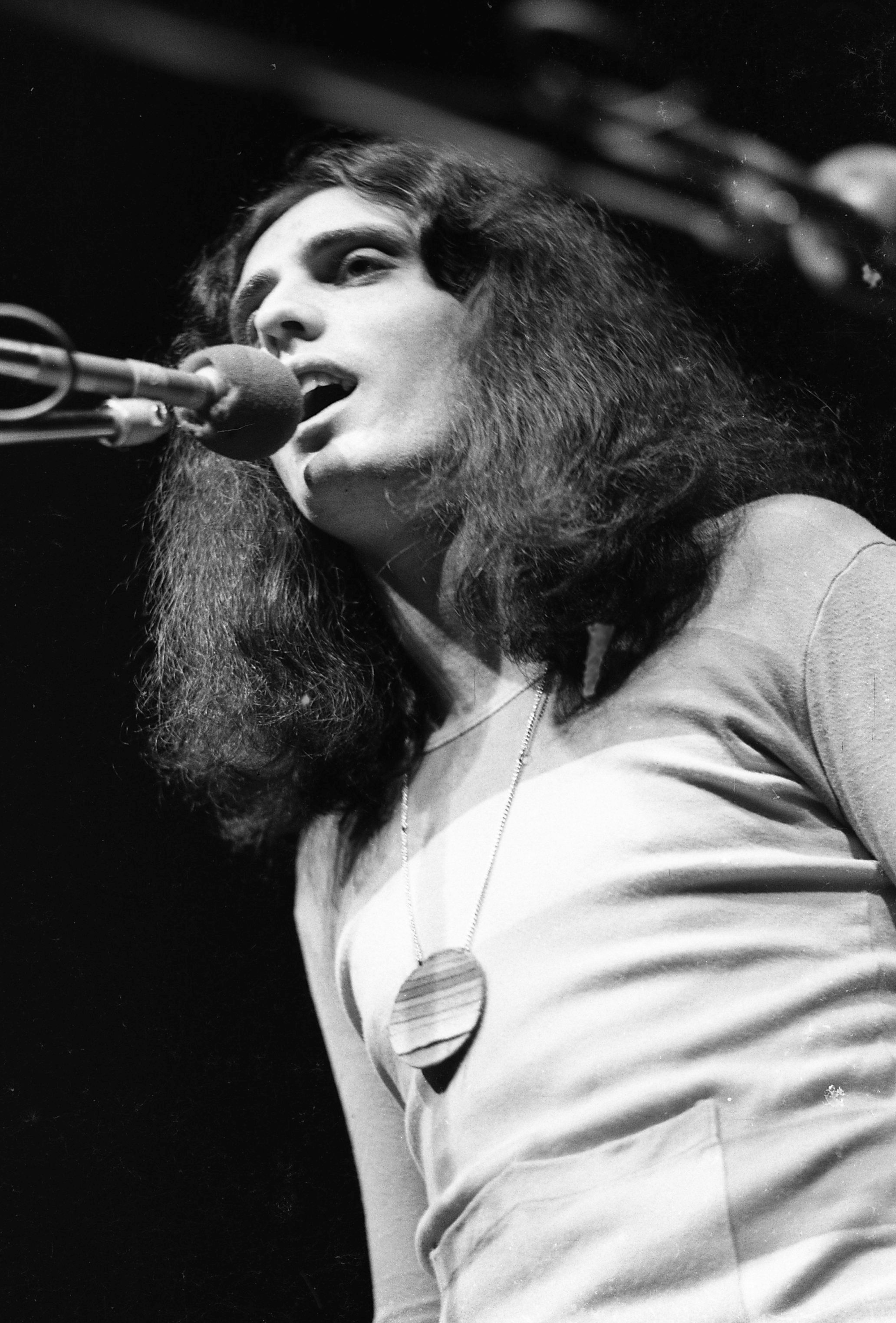
Pick performing in front of soldiers in Beit HaHayal at Tel Aviv, 1972

In 1972, he entered a tune for the Shema prayer in the Chassidic Song Festival. The tune violated Jewish law by repeating lines of the prayer.

Pick was one of Israel's leading pop singers in the 1970s, and was named "Israeli male singer of the year" by Kol Israel every year from 1977 to 1980. He played a lead part in the Hebrew version of the musical Hair in the early 1970s.

Pick wrote the song "Diva" with lyricist Yoav Ginai and performed by Dana International, which won the Eurovision Song Contest 1998. He also wrote songs for several other Eurovision contestants. In 2002 he reunited with Ginai to write the "Light a Candle" for Sarit Hadad, who represented Israel in the Eurovision Song Contest 2002. That year, Habima Theater staged a musical called Mary Lou based on Pick's old hits. In 2009, this musical was made into the television series Tamid Oto Chalom (or Mary Lou), directed by Eytan Fox.

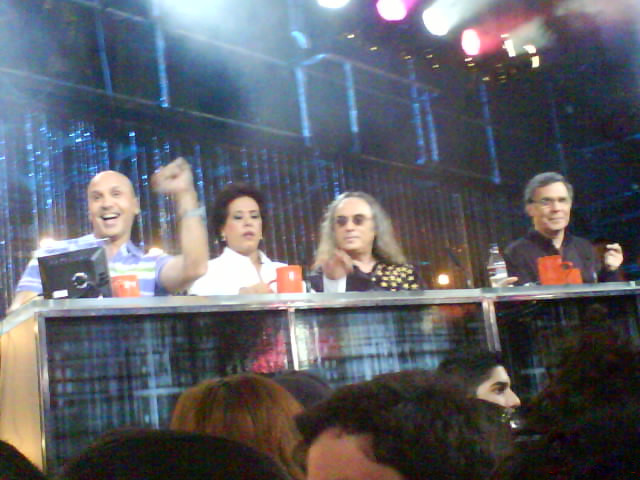
Pick as a judge on Kokhav Nolad in 2008

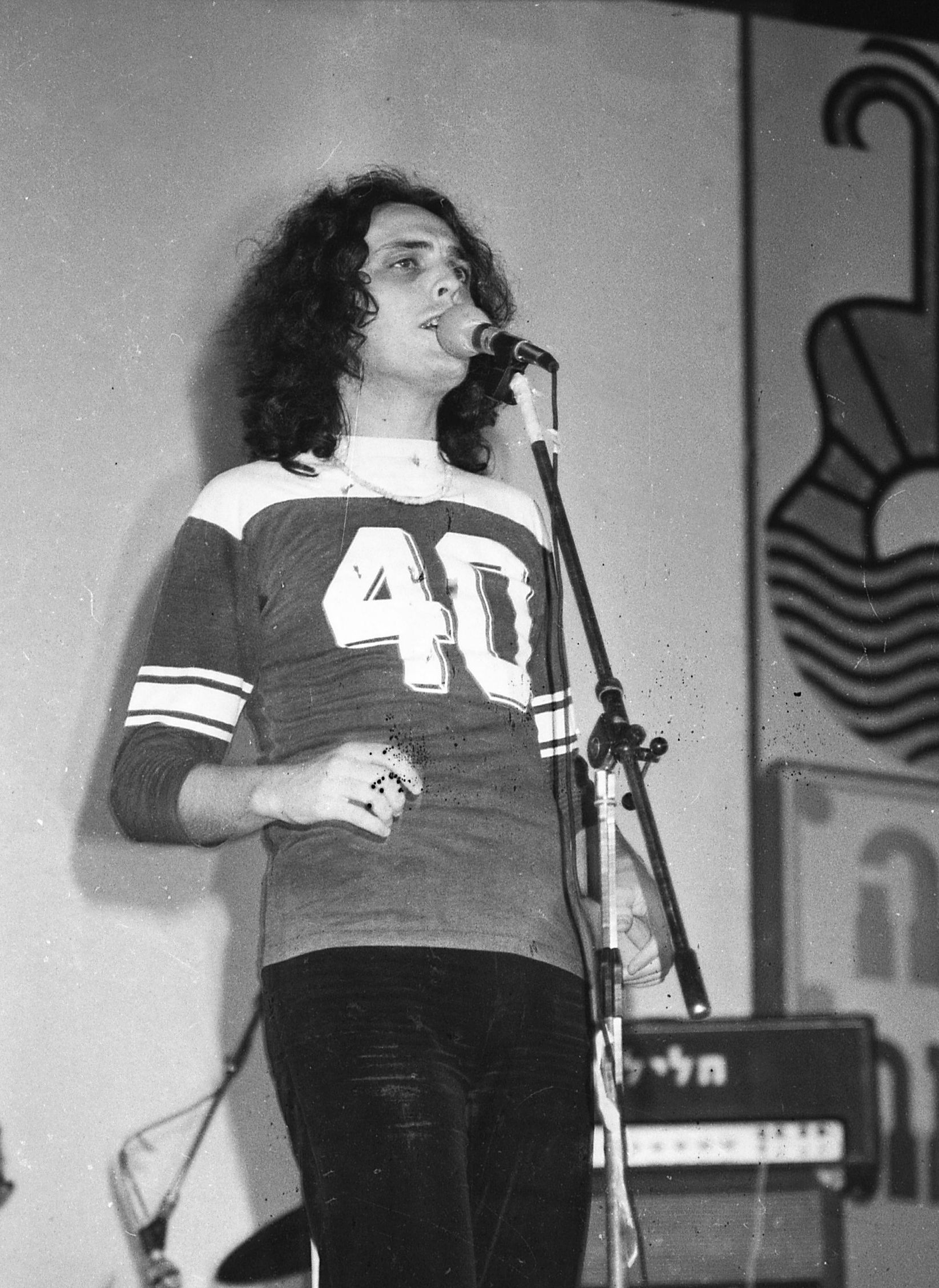
Svika Pick performs at a music festival at the Neviot Beach, Eilat, 1978

In 2003, he composed the song "Hasta la vista" with Shem-Or, to whom he was married at the time, for Oleksandr Ponomariov, Ukrainian entrant in Eurovision 2003. He also wrote a song for the Belarusian contestant of Eurovision 2005, Angelica Agurbash, but she later decided on a different one, acknowledging Pick for his effort. He competed seven times in the Israeli preselection for the Eurovision Song Contest. In 2010, he composed an entry for Harel Skaat for Israel, and for Sopho Nizharadze for Georgia.

=== Eurovision entries ===
==== Eurovision Song Contest ====
- "Diva" by Dana International, Israel, (Eurovision Song Contest 1998), 1st place
- "Light a Candle" by Sarit Hadad, Israel, (Eurovision Song Contest 2002), 12th place
- "Hasta la vista" by Oleksandr Ponomariov, Ukraine, (Eurovision Song Contest 2003), 14th place

==== National selections ====
- "Ein li ish milvadi" by Svika Pick (Israel 1979), 2nd place
- "Romantica" by Svika Pick (Israel 1982), 6th place
- "Layla layla" by Svika Pick (Israel 1986), 7th place
- "Domino" by Svika Pick (Israel 1987), 10th place (tied)
- "Artik Kartiv" by Svika Pick (Israel 1993), 7th place
- "Moonlight" by Svika Pick (Israel 2005), 3rd place
- "Lifney SheNifradim" by Svika Pick (Israel 2006), 4th place
- "Sing My Song" by Sofia Nizharadze (Georgia 2010)

== Television career ==
From 2005 to 2009, Pick was one of the judges for the singing reality show Kokhav Nolad (the Israeli version of Pop Idol) that aired on Channel 2.

In 2005, Pick starred in the docu-reality series HaMaestro that aired on Bip and followed the daily lives of him and his family.

In 2009, the musical drama series Tamid Oto Chalom ("Always the same dream") aired on HOT 3. Pick's songs were used for its title and soundtrack, and he guest starred in one of the episodes.

| Preceded by Kimberley Rew | Eurovision Song Contest winning composers 1998 | Succeeded by Lars Diedricson |
