= Israeli Annual Hebrew Song Chart =

Song chart of Hebrew songs

The Israeli Annual Hebrew Song Chart (Hebrew: מצעד הפזמונים העברי השנתי, Mitz’ad HaPizmonim) is an annual Israeli Hebrew-language song ranking and awards program. It has been broadcast on radio each year on the eve of Rosh Hashanah since 1969.

Two main charts are currently produced: one on Kan Gimel of the Israeli Public Broadcasting Corporation (originally on Reshet Gimmel of Kol Yisrael, and between 1969 and 1997 included in the program Makom BaTzameret), and another on Galgalatz, operated by the Israel Defense Forces (Galei Tzahal).

The annual charts summarize the weekly rankings broadcast during the previous year. The selected songs are played in order, with the top-ranked song designated “Song of the Year". Additional titles are awarded in categories such as “Male Singer of the Year”, “Female Singer of the Year", “Band or Group of the Year", and “Discovery/Breakthrough of the Year".

The results are determined primarily through listeners’ votes, sometimes combined with consideration of weekly chart performance.

== History ==
Mitz’ad HaPizmonim has been broadcast continuously since 1963. Over the decades, it has become a central tradition in Israeli popular music.

== Winners ==
=== Kol Yisrael ===
Year	Song of the Year	Male Singer of the Year	Female Singer of the Year	Band of the Year	Breakthrough of the year
1969	Al Kapav Yavi (על כפיו יביא) – Rivka Zohar (Yoram Taharlev, Yair Rosenblum)	Avi Toledano	Rivka Zohar	Lehakat HaNahal	
1970	Pit'om Achshav, Piton HaYom (פתאום עכשיו, פתאום היום) – Shlomo Artzi (Tirtza Atar, Ya'akov Hollaender)	Shlomo Artzi	Rivka Zohar	Lehakat Cheil HaYam	
1971	Matok Matok (מתוק מתוק) – Lehakat Pikud HaTzafon (Ilan Goldhirsh, Ilan Mochi'ach)	Sassi Keshet	Ilanit	Lehakat Pikud HaDarom	
1972	HaYom HaYom (היום היום) – Shlishiyat Pikud Merkaz (Dudu Barak, Moni Amarillio)	Shlomo Artzi	Ilanit	Aharit HaYamim; Lehakat Cheil HaYam	
1973	HaMagafayim Shel Barukh (המגפיים של ברוך) – Kaveret (Danny Sanderson, Alon Olearchik, Menachem Zilberman)	Shlomo Artzi	Ilanit	Kaveret	
1974	Natati La Khayay (נתתי לה חיי) – Kaveret (Danny Sanderson, Alon Olearchik)	Shlomo Artzi	Ilanit	Kaveret	
1975	Golyat (גוליית) – Kaveret (Alon Olearchik, Danny Sanderson)	Yigal Bashan	Ilanit	Kaveret	
1976	Rutzi Shmulik (רוצי שמוליק) – Ariel Zilber (Shmulik Chizik)	Ariel Zilber	Ilanit	Kaveret	
1977	Slichot (סליחות) – Yehudit Ravitz (Leah Goldberg, Oded Lerer)	Svika Pick	Ilanit	The Brothers & the Sisters	
1978	Ne'esaf Tishrei (נאסף תשרי) – Svika Pick (Natan Yonatan, Svika Pick)	Svika Pick	Chava Alberstein	–	
1979	Hallelujah (הללויה) – Milk and Honey (Shimrit Or, Kobi Oshrat)	Svika Pick	Gali Atari	Gazoz	
1980	Galgal Anak (גלגל ענק) - Milk and Honey (Shimrit Or, Kobi Oshrat)	Svika Pick	Ofra Haza	Milk and Honey	
1981	Lir'ot Ota HaYom (לראות אותה היום) – T-Slam (Danni Bassan, Yair Nitzani, Yoshi Sade, Tzuf Philosof, Izhar Ashdot)	Shlomo Artzi	Ofra Haza	T-Slam	
1982	Yom Shishi (יום שישי) – Benzene (Ya'akov Gilad, Yehuda Poliker)	Yigal Bashan	Ofra Haza	Benzene	
1983	Chai (חי) – Ofra Haza (Ehud Manor, Avi Toledano)	David Broza	Ofra Haza	T-Slam	
1984	Tirkod (תרקוד) – Shlomo Artzi (Shlomo Artzi)	Shlomo Artzi	Yardena Arazi	Benzene	
1985	Anachnu Nish'arim Ba'Aretz (אנחנו נשארים בארץ) – Kmo Tzo'ani (Yigal Bashan, Uzi Hitman)	Alon Olearchik	Yardena Arazi	Tango	
1986	Shvil HaBricha (שביל הבריחה) – Rita (Michal Brant, Rami Kleinstein)	Shlomo Artzi	Rita	Mashina	
1987	Ba'a Me'Ahava (באה מאהבה) – Yehudit Ravitz (Yaakov Rotblit, Yehudit Ravitz)	Adam	Yardena Arazi	Mashina	
1988	Mitzta'er (מצטער) – Adam (Rachel Shapira, Izhar Ashdot)	Adam	Yardena Arazi	Mashina	
1989	Rikud HaMechona (ריקוד המכונה) – Mashina (Shlomi Bracha)	Danny Robas	Rita	Mashina	
1990	Tzai'ri Lach Safam (ציירי לך שפם) – Noar Shulayim (Mikiyagi, Dudi Levi, Aran Amir, Kobi Pitero, Roee Shaked)	Uri Fineman	Si Heiman	Noar Shulayim	
1991	HaKayitz Ha'Acharon (הקיץ האחרון) – Shfiyut Zmanit (Max Gat Mor)	Gidi Gov	Etti Ankri	Ethnix	
1992	Ahava Ktzara (אהבה קצרה) – Meir Banai (Meir Banai)	Meir Banai	Gali Atari	Ethnix	
1993	Jessica (ג'סיקה) – Ethnix feat. Yevgeni Shapovalov (Ze'ev Nechama, Tamir Kalinski)	Aviv Geffen	Etti Ankri	Ethnix	
1994	Ha'im Lihiot Bach Me'ohav (האם להיות בך מאוהב) – Aviv Geffen (Aviv Geffen)	Aviv Geffen	Sharon Haziz	Ethnix	
1995	Tapuchim VeTmarim (תפוחים ותמרים) – Rami Kleinstein (Eitan Nahmias Glass, Rami Kleinstein)	Rami Kleinstein	Dana International	Avtipus	
1996	Shnayim (שניים) – Shlomo Artzi & Rita (Shlomo Artzi)	Shlomo Artzi	Rita	Ethnix	
1997	Kol Ma SheTirtzi (כל מה שתרצי) – Rami Kleinstein (Rami Kleinstein)	Eyal Golan	Iggy Waxman	Teapacks	
1998	D'maot (דמעות) – Eyal Golan (Ze'ev Nechama, Tamir Kalinski)	Eyal Golan	Dana International	Hi-Five	Ben Artzi
1999	Ze Kol HaKesem (זה כל הקסם) – Nimrod Lev & Orli Perl (Nimrod Lev)	Eyal Golan	Sarit Hadad	Knesiyat HaSekhel	Nimrod Lev
2000	LeKol Echad Yesh (לכל אחד יש) – Shlomi Shabat & Lior Narkis (Uzi Hitman, Shlomi Shabat)	Shlomo Artzi	Dana Berger	Teapacks	Uri Banai
2001	Yalla, Lech HaBayta Moti (יאללה לך הביתה מוטי) – Sarit Hadad (Kobi Oz)	Arkadi Duchin	Sarit Hadad	Teapacks	Tal Segev
2002	Darkenu (דרכנו) – Hani Furstenberg & Sarit Vino-Elad (Yaakov Rotblit, Izhar Ashdot)	Shlomo Artzi	Sarit Hadad	Ethnix	Muki
2003	Im Telech (אם תלך) – The Idan Raichel Project (Idan Raichel)	Yehuda Poliker	Dana Berger	The Idan Raichel Project	The Idan Raichel Project
2004	Yom Ve'Od Yomayim (יום ועוד יומיים) – Shay Gabso (Shay Gabso)	Ehud Banai	Maya Bouskilla	Hadag Nahash	Shay Gabso
2005	HaSheket SheNish'ar (השקט שנשאר) – Shiri Maimon (Pini Aharonbayev, Eyal Shachar)	Ivri Lider	Shiri Maimon	The Idan Raichel Project	Miri Mesika
2006	Ve'At (ואת) – Harel Skaat (Keren Peles)	Harel Skaat	Keren Peles	Beit HaBubot	Keren Peles
2007	Achshav Ata Chozer BeChazara (עכשיו אתה חוזר בחזרה) – Miri Mesika (Erik Berman)	Erik Berman	Miri Mesika	Synergia	Erik Berman
2008	Hozeh Otach Muli (הוזה אותך מולי) – Eyal Golan (Yossi Ben-David, Kyriakos Papadopoulos)	Eyal Golan	Keren Peles	Ran Danker & Ilai Botner	Alma Zohar
2009	Ze Ani (זה אני) – Eyal Golan (Yossi Gispan, Kyriakos Papadopoulos)	Evyatar Banai	Sarit Hadad	The Idan Raichel Project	Dor Daniel
2010	Tagidu La (תגידו לה) – Dudu Aharon (Dudu Aharon, Konstantinos Pantzis)	Dudu Aharon	Roni Dalumi	Hadag Nahash	Daniela Spector
2011	Ke'ev Shel Lochamim (כאב של לוחמים) – Idan Amedi (Idan Amedi)	Eyal Golan	Miri Mesika	Shiri Maimon & Shimon Bouskila	Idan Amedi
2012	Zikukim (זיקוקים) – Moshe Peretz (Tal Raviv, Shmulik Noifeld)	Harel Skaat	Miri Mesika	Ethnix	Ilai Botner VeYaldey HaChutz
2013	Nigmar (נגמר) – Idan Amedi (Idan Amedi)	Idan Amedi	Yardena Arazi	Ilai Botner VeYaldey HaChutz	–
2014	Targil BeHit'orerut (תרגיל בהתעוררות) – Shlomi Shaban & Chava Alberstein (Shlomi Shaban)	Muki	Dikla	Monica Sex	Yuval Dayan
2015	Golden Boy – Nadav Guedj (Doron Medalie)	Shimon Bouskila	Dikla	Ilai Botner VeYaldey HaChutz	Nadav Guedj
2016	Silsulim (סלסולים) – Static & Ben El Tavori (Liraz Russo (Static), Ben El Tavori)	Idan Raichel	Dikla	Café Shahor Hazak	Avior Malasa
2017	Tavo'i HaYom (תבואי היום) – Eyal Golan (Avi Ohayon, Matan Dror)	Eyal Golan	Eden Ben Zaken	Static & Ben El Tavori	Moti Taka
2018	Toy – Netta (Doron Medalie, Stav Beger)	Omer Adam	Netta	Static & Ben El Tavori	Stephane Legar

== See also ==
- Music of Israel

== Sources ==
- "אחורה צעד: על מצעדי הפזמונים השנתיים". מקור ראשון. 29 August 2010.
