= Mi Yada She'Kach Yieye =

Single by Boaz Sharabi

from the album Boaz Sharabi (1974)
- Language: Hebrew
- English title: Who Knew It Would Be Like This?
- Released: July 1973, 1974
- Songwriter: Uzi Hitman

Performance of the song by Hitman and Sharabi
- "עוזי חיטמן ובעז שרעבי - מי ידע שכך יהיה" on YouTube

"Mi Yada She'Kach Yieye" (Hebrew: מי ידע שכך יהיה, lit. 'Who Knew It Would Be Like This?') is a 1973 Israeli protest song written and composed by Uzi Hitman, and then recorded and released by Boaz Sharabi in July of that year, three months before the Yom Kippur War, which it became synonymous with. The song was later re-recorded with new lyrics and re-released in 1974, after the war had ended.

Aside from its association with the Yom Kippur War, the song remains popular as a memorial song during Yom HaZikaron.

== Background and lyrics ==
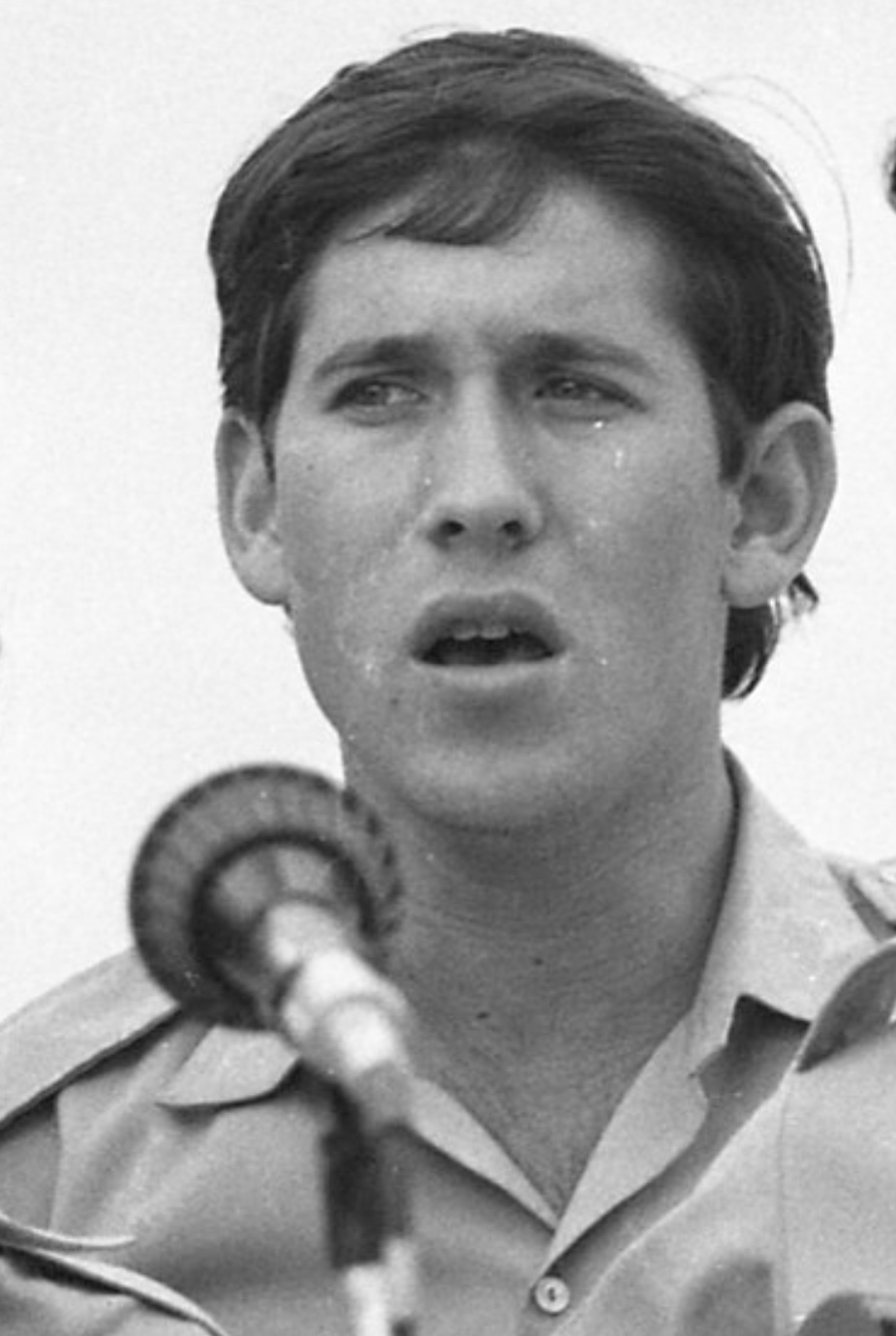
Uzi Hitman wrote "Mi Yada She'Kach Yieye" to mark the end of his military service (Pictured in 1972, during his service with the Central Command Band).

Uzi Hitman wrote the song in the summer of 1973 to mark the end of his service in the Israel Defense Forces. Hitman's service was partially as a member of a military ensemble, specifically the Central Command Band, and partially in combat roles. He wrote it as a critique of war, saying in an interview on Ynet that "[u]nlike other military ensemble members, two-thirds of my service was spent in combat roles". The original lyrics of the song included a pessimistic final verse and chorus: "Yes, it is over, and yes, it has passed, but I felt like I've been through too much." and "Who Knew That It Would Be Like This? That after a few nights away from your mother, you'll come back and realize that nothing's changed."

Hitman would perform the song alongside Boaz Sharabi during concerts in front of reserve duty soldiers.

It was here that Sharabi asked if he could record the song as a single. Hitman agreed, and the original version of the song was recorded and released in July 1973. Both this version and the second version of the song were arranged by Kobi Oshrat.

== Initial reception and rewrite ==
The song did not receive much airplay, and its airplay was reduced even further after the Yom Kippur War started, out of fears that it would demoralize troops.

This inspired Hitman to rewrite the final verse and chorus to be more optimistic: "We'll come back home, come back to our friends. We'll take off the olive uniforms and go to better days." and "Who will give and so it will be that after a few nights away from home, we'll go into better days and see a dove carrying an olive branch". Sharabi re-recorded the song with the new verses, and this is the version of the song that is regularly played today.

This version of the song would receive enough airplay to peak at number 2 on the weekly charts, but the song did not make it to the Israeli Annual Hebrew Song Chart of that year.

== Legacy ==
Despite the song's relatively modest success, it has endured in Israeli culture as an anthem of the Yom Kippur War and as an anti-war song in general. Its association with the Yom Kippur War has led to the song being the namesake of, amongst other things, a compilation of songs from the era and a documentary about the war. It was also included in a contemporary compilation of songs of the era.

Avner Gadassi covered the song in 1976, marking the first of several cover versions of the song, which include covers by the likes of Haim Moshe, Eyal Golan, Yishai Levi, and many others.

It was the first successful song for Hitman, who would have a long and successful career as a singer-songwriter in the years after its release.

Due to its hopeful lyrics and themes related to combat service, the song receives consistent airplay on Yom HaZikaron.

== See also ==
- Shir LaShalom, a similar anti-war song that received limited airplay due to its contents.
- List of anti-war songs
