= Yaakov Rotblit =

Israeli musician and journalist

Yaakov "Yankele" Rotblit יעקב (יענקל'ה) רוטבליט
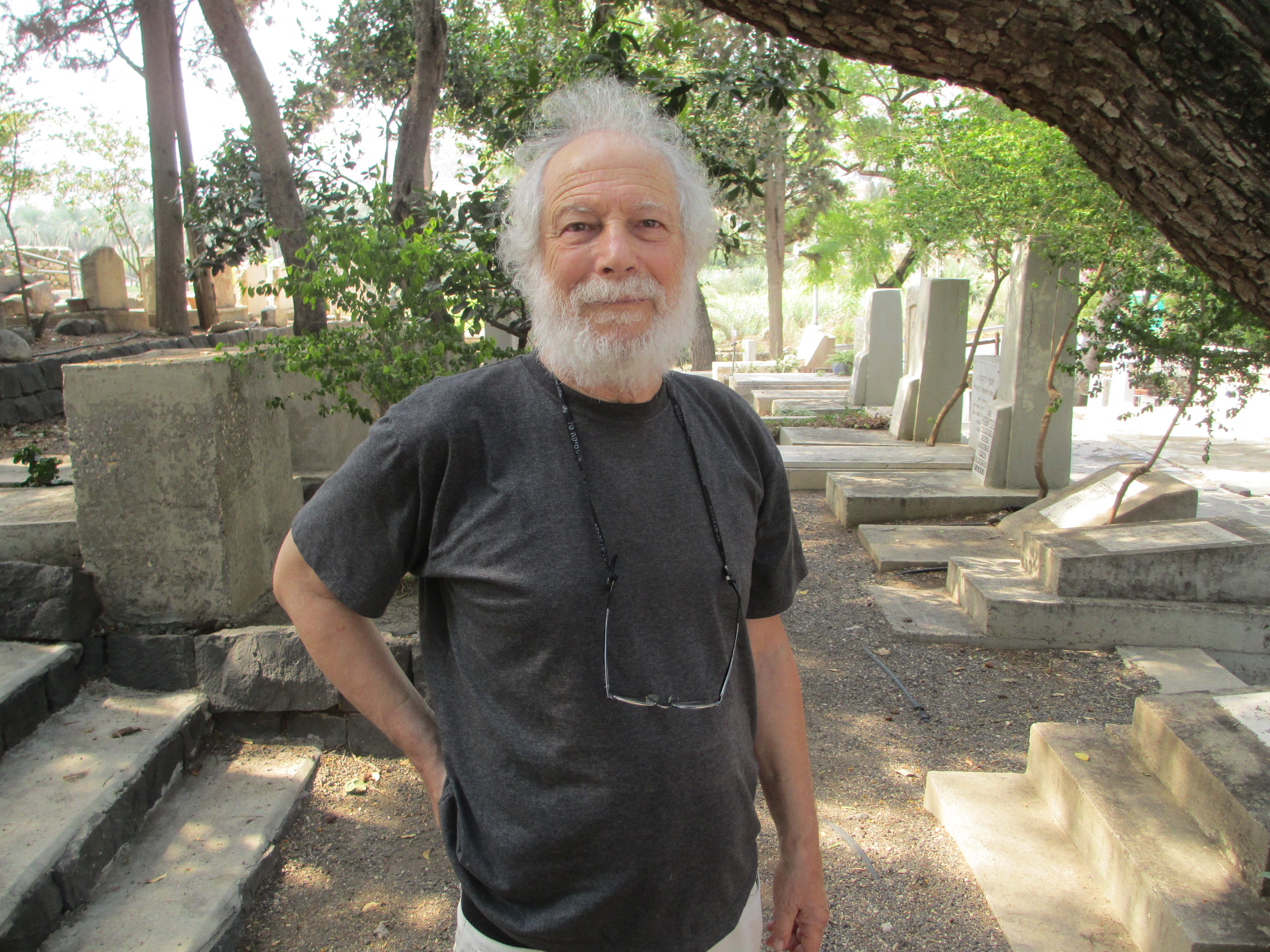

Background information
- Born: 1945 (age 80–81); Haifa, Mandatory Palestine
- Genres: Folk; Rock; Pop; Zemer Ivri
- Occupations: Songwriter, singer, composer, journalist
- Instruments: Guitar, vocals
- Years active: 1968–present
- Labels: Hed Arzi Music, NMC Music, HatavHashmini
- Website: yaacovrotblit.co.il

Yaakov "Yankele" Rotblit (Hebrew: יעקב רוֹטְבְּלִיט; born in 1945) is an Israeli songwriter, singer, composer, and journalist best known for writing the lyrics for the Shir LaShalom.

== Early life ==
Rotblit was born in Haifa in 1945. He was a member of Agudat Yordei Yam Zebulon and Hashomer Hatzair. After finishing his secondary education in Hugim high school, he enlisted to Nahal with a Hashomer Hatzair group formed for the completion of Kibbutz Metzer. After his discharge from the IDF he attended the Hebrew University of Jerusalem where he studied history and international relations.

While he was in university, the Six-Day War started and he left his studies to fight as a platoon leader in the 63rd battalion of the Jerusalem Brigade. During the battle over Abu Tor, Rotblit was severely wounded in his hand, and lost a leg.

== Musical career ==
=== Songwriting ===
Rotblit's first song, "Zemer Shekazeh" (זמר שכזה, "Such A Song") was recorded in 1968.

His second song, "Shir LaShalom" (שיר לשלום, "A Song To Peace") was written in 1969 and became an anthem of the Israeli peace movement. The song was set to music by Yair Rosenblum and was first performed in 1969 by the Infantry Ensemble (להקת הנחל) of the Israel Defense Forces as part of its Sinai Infantry Outpost program, during the War of Attrition between Israel and Egypt. It featured the soloist Miri Aloni, who later became a celebrated folk singer and actor.

At the close of a peace rally on 4 November 1995, the vocalist Miri Aloni, the groups Gevatron and Irusim, Shimon Peres and Prime Minister Yitzhak Rabin led the crowd in singing Shir LaShalom. Just after the rally ended, Yitzhak Rabin was assassinated. In his shirt pocket was found a page with the song's lyrics, stained with his blood.

During his musical career, Rotblit wrote dozens of popular songs, among them "Ima Adama" (אמא אדמה), "Kama Tov SheBaata HaBaita" (כמה טוב שבאת הביתה), "Ani Roeh Otah BaDerech LaGimnasia" (אני רואה אותה בדרך לגימנסיה), "Kafe Turki" (קפה טורקי), "Shabatot VeHagim" (שבתות וחגים), "Baa MeAhava" (באה מאהבה), "Ahrei 'Esrim Shana" (אחרי עשרים שנה), "Hoze Leh Brach" (חוזה לך ברח), "Luakh VaGir" (לוח וגיר), "Dvarim SheRaziti Lomar" (דברים שרציתי לומר), "Roim Rahok Roim Shakuf" (רואים רחוק רואים שקוף), and "Darchenu" (דרכנו).

Rotblit wrote songs for the most popular singers in Israel, among them Arik Einstein, Shmulik Kraus, Yehudit Ravitz, Shalom Hanoch, Matti Caspi, Nurit Galron, Riki Gal, Korin Elal, Yehuda Poliker, Shlomo Artzi, Miki Gavrielov, Josie Katz, T-Slam, Izhar Ashdot, Ahrit Hayamim, Danni Bassan, Yigal Bashan, Ariel Zilber, and Ninet Tayeb.

Several artists released entire albums in collaboration with Rotblit, including Arik Einstein's BaDeshe Etzel Avigdor (1971), Yehudit Ravitz's Baa MeAhava (1987), Danni Bassan's eponymous album (1986), Shmulik Kraus's Galgal Mistovev (1982), Ahrei 'Esrim Shana (1988), Yediduti LaSviva (1994), and Yom Rodef Yom (2003).

=== Solo albums ===
In 1978 Rotblit released his first solo album, Kach Shihrarti Et Yerushalaim (כך שחררתי את ירושלים, This is how I liberated Jerusalem), also called "The Victory Album". The album was not allowed on the air for a certain period, but nonetheless received a fan following. The ten songs on the album include pacifist protest songs as well as songs about love and his personal experiences as a commander during the Six-Day War.

In 1989 Rotblit released a second album titled Mikhtavim M'Bait Revii (מכתבים מבית רביעי, Letters From The Fourth Temple). This album also included sociopolitical songs alongside love songs and other personal songs. The title implies the downfall of a Third Temple which refers to the modern state of Israel.

=== HaHazer HaAchorit ===
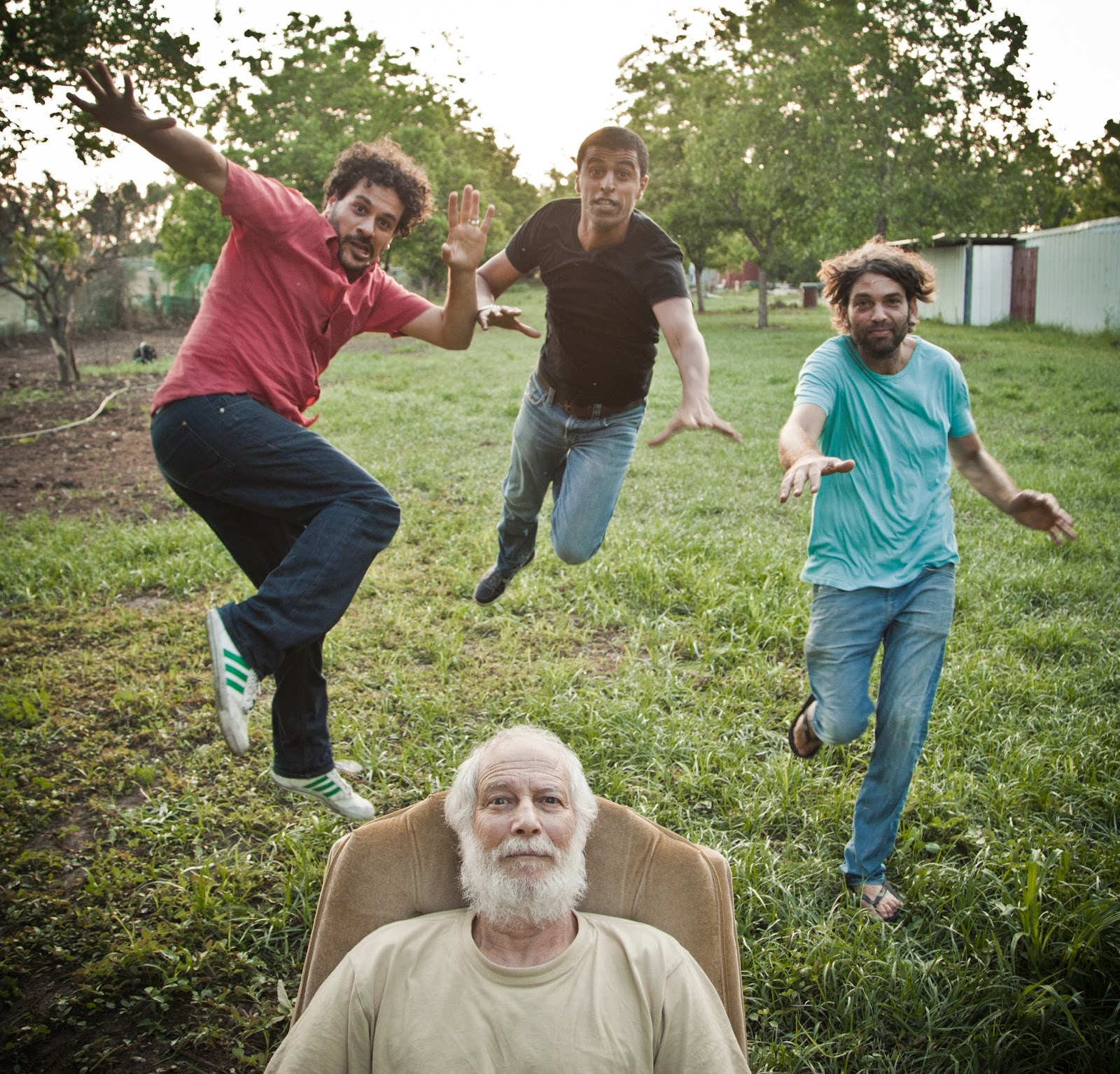
Yaakov Rotblit (front) with members of HaHazer HaAchorit. Left to Right: Gdi Ronen, Tomer Yosef, and Itamar Ziegler.

In 2011, Rotblit formed the rock group HaHazer HaAchorit (החצר האחורית, "The Backyard") with Tomer Yosef (a vocalist from the group Balkan Beat Box), Itamar Ziegler (guitar and bass), and Gdi Ronen (keyboard).

The group released an album by the same name in 2013. Many of the songs on the album are protest songs about the social and political realities in Israel. In 2017, the band released its second album titled HaHatzer HaAkhorit 2 (החצר האחורית 2, The Backyard 2). In 2024, the band released its third album, titled HaHatzer HaAkhorit 3 (החצר האחורית 3, The Backyard 3).

== Journalistic career ==
Between 1970 and 1973 Rotblit authored a satirical column Sahek Ota (שחק אותה) in a supplement of Haaretz, as well as a column called Galgel Ota (גלגל אותה) in the mid-week edition of that paper.

In later years he wrote personal columns and articles in the newspapers Hadashot, HaOlam HaZeh, Davar, Maariv, Ha'ir, and others.

== Personal life ==
In 1982 he married Orna, who died in 1998 following an illness. Rotblit was left with their three children, Alia, Orian, and Adam. In 2021 Rotblit with his partner Yulia Rzaev became parents to his youngest daughter Shira Rotblit.

Rotblit moved to Jerusalem in 1976 after several years of living in various places in Israel and abroad.

In 2005, Rotblit was elected as chairman of the board at ACUM.

== Discography ==
- כך שחררתי את ירושלים (This Is How I Liberated Jerusalem) (1968)
- מכתבים מבית רביעי (Letters From The Fourth Temple) (1989)
- מדינת היהודים / קטעים (The Jewish State / Fragments) (2004)
- מדינת היהודים / חלק ב (The Jewish State / Part II) (2005)
- צומת עלעול (Whirlwind Junction) (2011)
- החצר האחורית (The Backyard) (with Tomer Yosef, Itamar Ziegler, and Gdi Ronen) (2013)

== Awards ==
In 1997 Rotblit received a lifetime achievement award from ACUM, the Israeli composer association.

In 1998, the Israel Theatre staged a tribute to Rotblit's work as part of the Israel Festival in Jerusalem.

In 2000, Rotblit received an honorary fellowship from the Sam Spiegel Film and Television School.
