= Israeli Air Force Band =

Israeli military band

Israeli Airforce Band להקת חיל האוויר
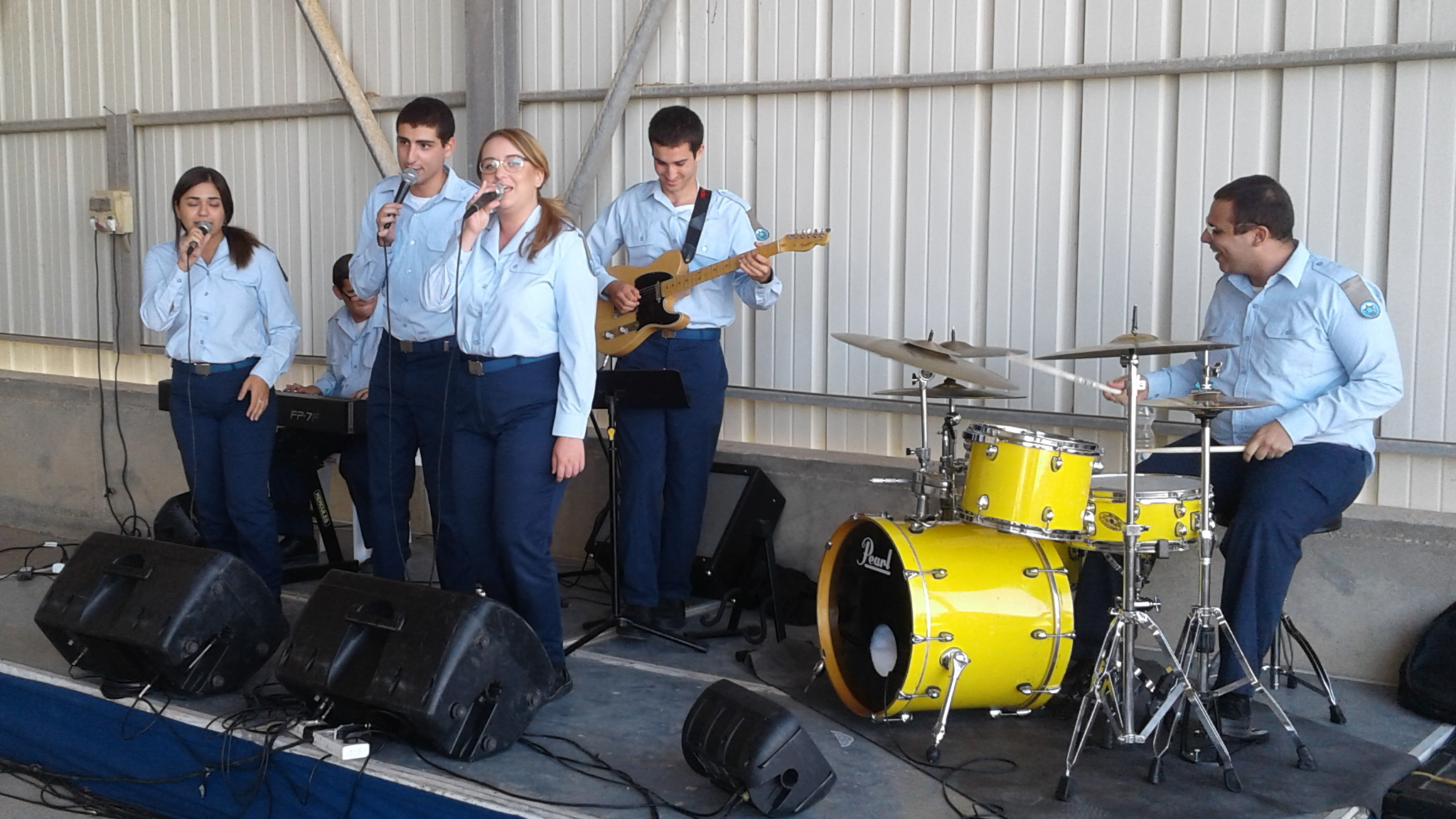

Background information
- Origin: Tel Aviv, Israel.
- Genres: Israeli pop, Israeli rock.
- Years active: 1970-present
- Labels: CBS, NMC, Hed Arzi Music

The Israeli Air Force Band (IAF Band) (Hebrew: להקת חיל האוויר) is the principal musical ensemble of the Israeli Air Force, a service branch of the Israel Defense Force (IDF).

The band enjoyed its greatest period of popularity in the 1970s, and several of their songs from that time period have become standards in Israeli culture.

== History ==
The Israeli Air Force Band was established in May 1948. It was directed by Erich Teich, who held the position for 35 years, until his death in 1983. Under Teich, the band was similar in style to Big bands and jazz bands.

The band is currently composed of a number of ensembles that play different genres such as ethnic music, jazz, and rock and roll.

== Notable members ==
- Ania Bukstein – Russian-Israeli actress, singer-songwriter, and pianist. She was drafted into the band after graduating high school and worked as a soloist during her tenure.
- Danni Bassan – Former member of the Israeli rock band T-Slam.
- Guy Zu-Aretz – Israeli actor and television host known for being the host of the show Survivor.
- Shay Gabso – Israeli singer who won third place in the Israeli reality show Kokhav Nolad. He composed music for the band.
- Udi Spielman – Israeli singer and Hazzan. He was a soloist during his time with the band.
- Omer Shaish – Israeli composer and pianist.
- Gal Abargil – Israeli musician and International DJ & Producer.

== See also ==
- Music of Israel
