= Izhar Ashdot =

Israeli musical artist

Izhar Ashdot יזהר אשדות
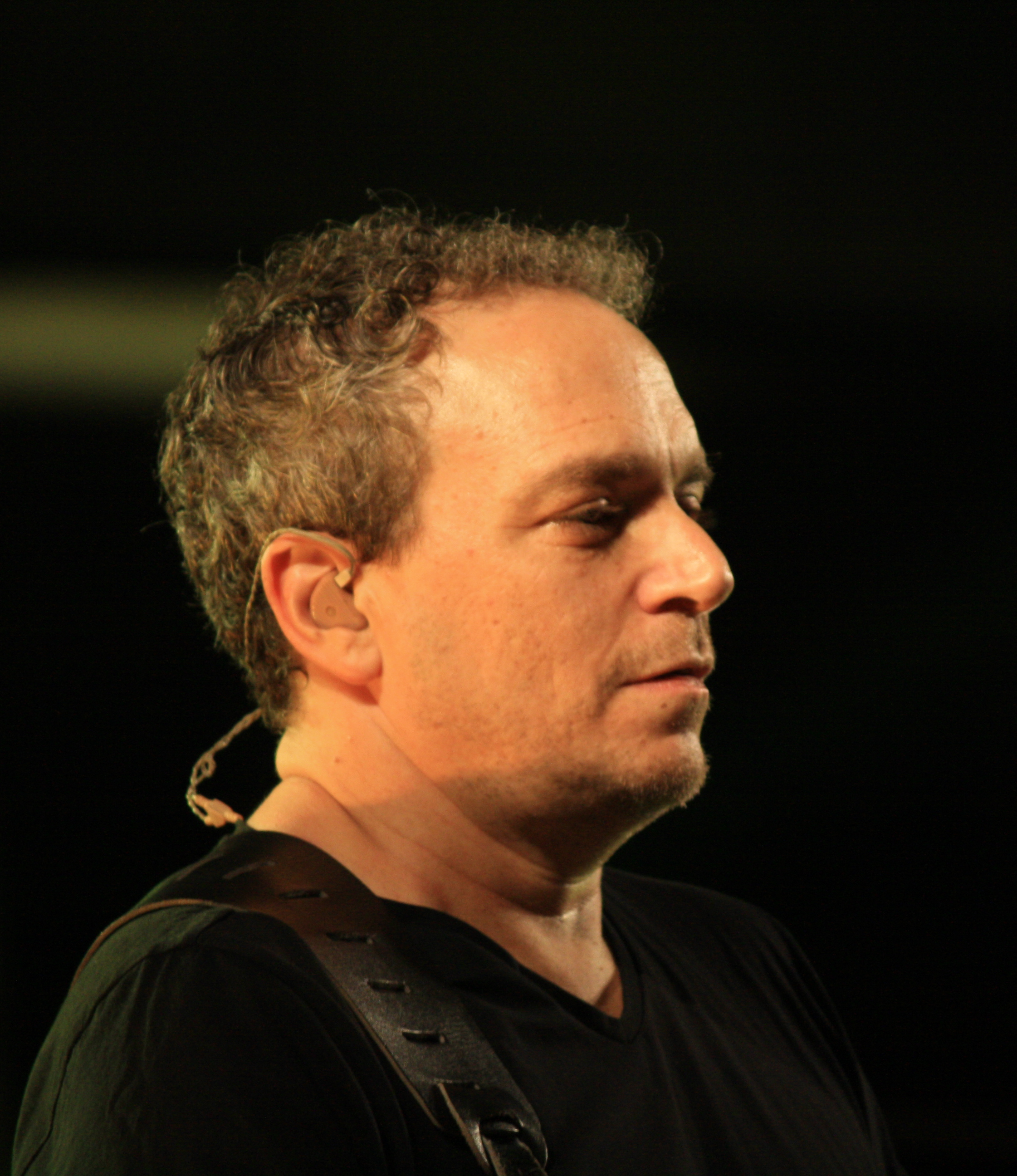

Background information
- Born: 23 November 1958 (age 67)
- Origin: Jerusalem, Israel
- Genres: Rock; Pop; Folk
- Instruments: Vocals guitar
- Years active: 1973–present
- Website: Ashdot.co.il

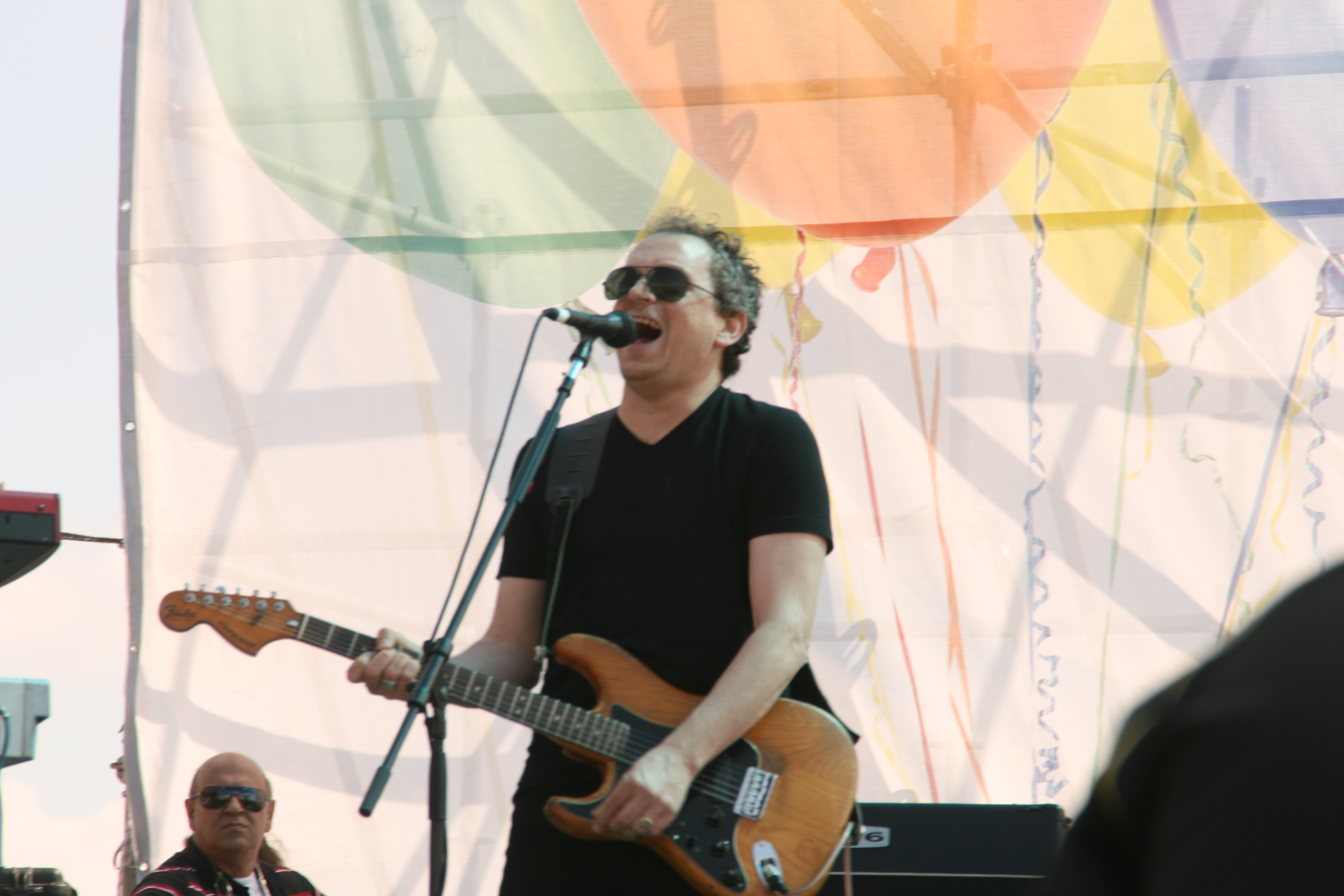
Izhar Ashdot playing with T-Slam during a performance in Achziv beach in celebration of 60 to Israel.

Izhar Ashdot (Hebrew: יזהר אשדות; born 23 November 1958) is an Israeli singer-songwriter, guitarist, and record producer. He is a co-founding member of the Israeli rock band T-Slam. Izhar is a recipient of the Israeli Copyright Society Lifetime Achievement award. He owns and manages a recording studio.

== Early life ==
When he was eleven, Ashdot started to play the guitar; two years later, he founded his first group, "The Red Dogs".

Ashdot spent a significant part of his childhood years in various countries, including Greece, France, and Cambodia, to which his parents travelled for work. From 15 to 18, he lived in the Netherlands, further extending his exposure to music and solidifying his identity as a musician.

== Military Service ==
In 1977, upon returning to Israel, Ashdot began his mandatory military service. He served as a music programming editor at 'Galei Tzahal', Israel Defense Forces Radio. Ashdot continued working on his own music and recorded the song "Me'uma Lo Kara" (Nothing Happened), which later became T-slam's biggest hit, retitled "Lir'ot Ota Haiom" (Seeing Her Today). While serving at the Military Radio station, Ashdot met Yair Nitzani and Dani Bassan. Together, they started working as DJs. Ashdot, Nitzani and Bassan joined forces with Yoshi Sade, Tzuf Philosof and Sami Avzardel and formed T-Slam, a successful rock band.

== Musical career ==
Ashdot is one of the founding members, lead guitarist and singer-songwriter of the Israeli rock band T-Slam. He also contributed lyrics and produced many of the band's songs. T-Slam became famous with their single "Radio Hazak" (Loud Radio) and later with the release of its album with the same name, which was certified platinum. In March 1981 their first tour began and was very successful. T-Slam won numerous Israeli awards, including "The Band of the Year", and "The Song of the Year" with "See Her Today."

After recording three albums, T-Slam disbanded in 1983, and Ashdot decided to create and produce music. In the 80s he worked with numerous artists, including Boaz Sharabi, Si Himan, Adam, Corinne Allal, Alon Ole'archik, Friends of Natasha (החברים של נטאשה) and Ofra Haza. A year later, Nitzani announced that "Galbi", a Yemenite song performed by Ofra Haza, would be produced by Izhar. In 1987 Izhar produced another song for Haza, "Im Nin'Alu". The single was a number 1 single in most European countries and became the 2nd best-selling in Europe in 1988, topping the Eurochart and receiving heavy rotation on MTV. Her album, "Shaday", produced by Ashdot, was also successful.

== Solo career ==
After the successful T-Slam reunion shows in 1990, Ashdot started to work on his first solo album, released in 1992 and eventually reaching "gold" status. The album included "Ish HaShokolad" (Chocolate Man), "HaLelilot Shelanu" (Our Nights), "Ma Tomri" (What Will You Say) and "No'a Shel HaYam" (The Sea's No'a). Two years later he recorded his second album, which included "Hiroshima Sheli" (My Hiroshima) and "Tzilo Shel Yom Kaitz" (Summer Day's Shadow).

The album "Hofa'a Haya BeHard Rock Cafe" (Live at the Hard Rock Cafe), released in 1995, included many of his songs in new live performances, including two new songs.

While producing albums for other artists, Ashdot continued to work on his own work and released his fourth album, "Zman Kesem" (Magic Time). In 2000, after the first Israeli music downloads internet site was released, Izhar released a compilation album only through the internet, called "Lech Im HaLev" (Go with the Heart). The album included performances from live shows and previously unreleased recordings. Between 2003 and 2005 he recorded his 5th album, "BeMerhak Negi'a MiKan".

In 2007, Ashdot released another compilation album, "Our Nights". In addition to Izhar's greatest hits, the album included three new songs – Kvish LeKivun Ehad ("One Way Road"), which he composed to his and Filosof's lyrics; Le'an Paneinu Achshav (Free Translation: "Where Are We Headed Now") and Mata'ei HaDuvdevan Shel Ukraina (" The Cherry Orchards of Ukraine"), in which he cooperated with Israeli singer and rapper Muki.

In January 2008, Izhar expanded his band and went on a new tour, celebrating his love for Irish music. On "Rikud Katan – The Irish Tour", Izhar invited multi-instrumentalist Ehud Nathan, who fronts the Celtic-Irish instrumental band "Ktifa Sh'hora" (Black Velvet), and violinist Dina Lurie to join his band. The successful tour yielded the live album Rikud Katan, which included the eponymous hit song.

In September 2012, Izhar released his fifth studio album, Inian Shel Hergel(A Matter of Habit). The album included three hit singles, "Erev Bli Telephone", "Yesh Lach Mazal She'at Blondinit" and El Esh Behira. The title track, "Inian Shel Hergel", created a large impact in October 2012 due to its criticism of the Israeli army. The controversy surrounding the song led to its ban on Israel Defense Forces Radio.

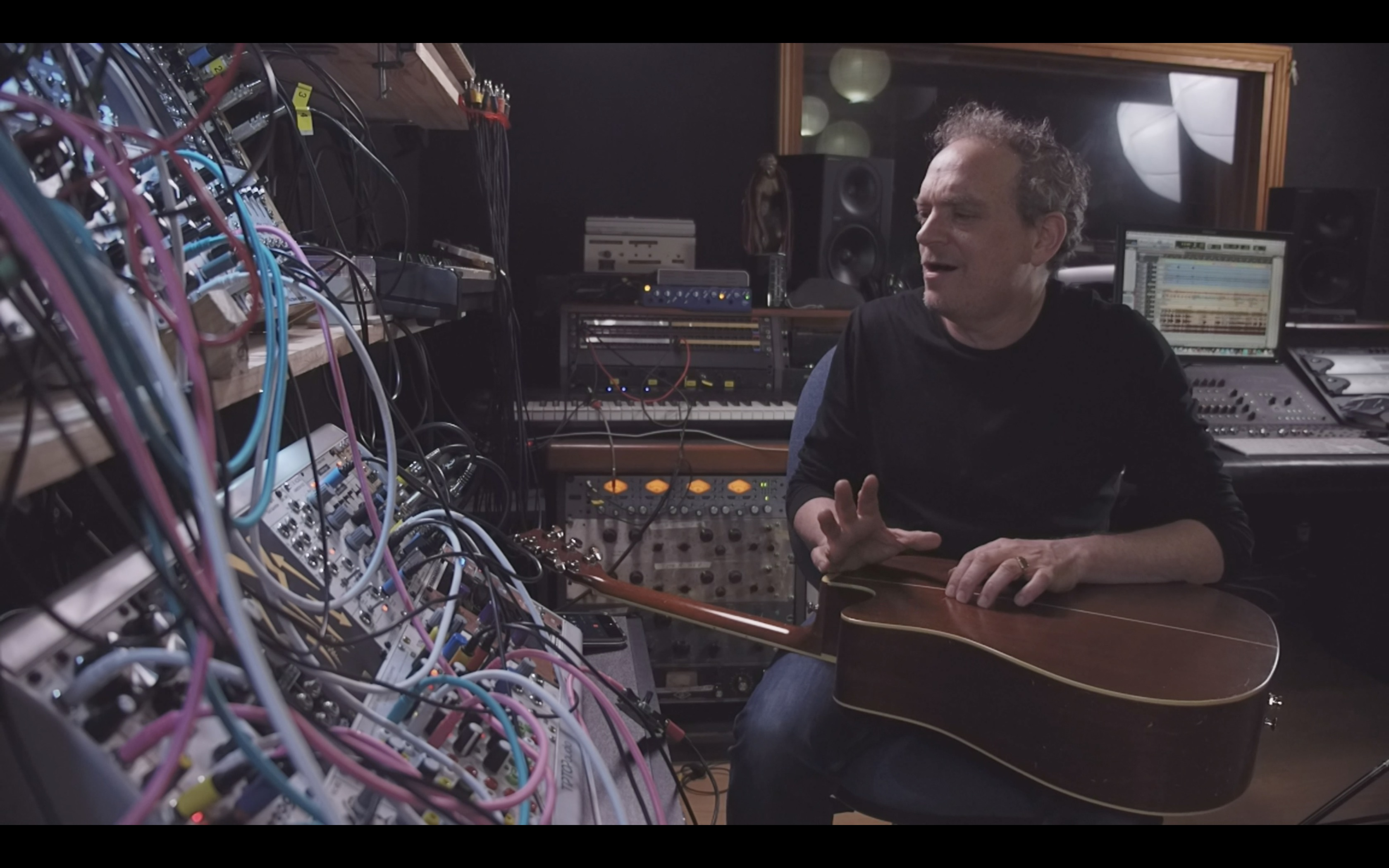
Izhar Ashdot at his studio in Tel Aviv, 2017

In 2016 and 2017 Izhar released three new singles, "At Vehageshem (You and the Rain)", "Kfar Zarfati (A French Village)", and "Ze Lo Hazman (It's not the Time)".

In July 2018, Izhar released his 6th studio album, Kach Holech Ha'Rooach (So Goes the Wind), co-produced with Moshe Levi. The album included six songs co-written with Yali Sobol and six instrumental tracks which Izhar composed and performed with a Eurorack Modular synthesizer rig.

=== Solo Discography ===
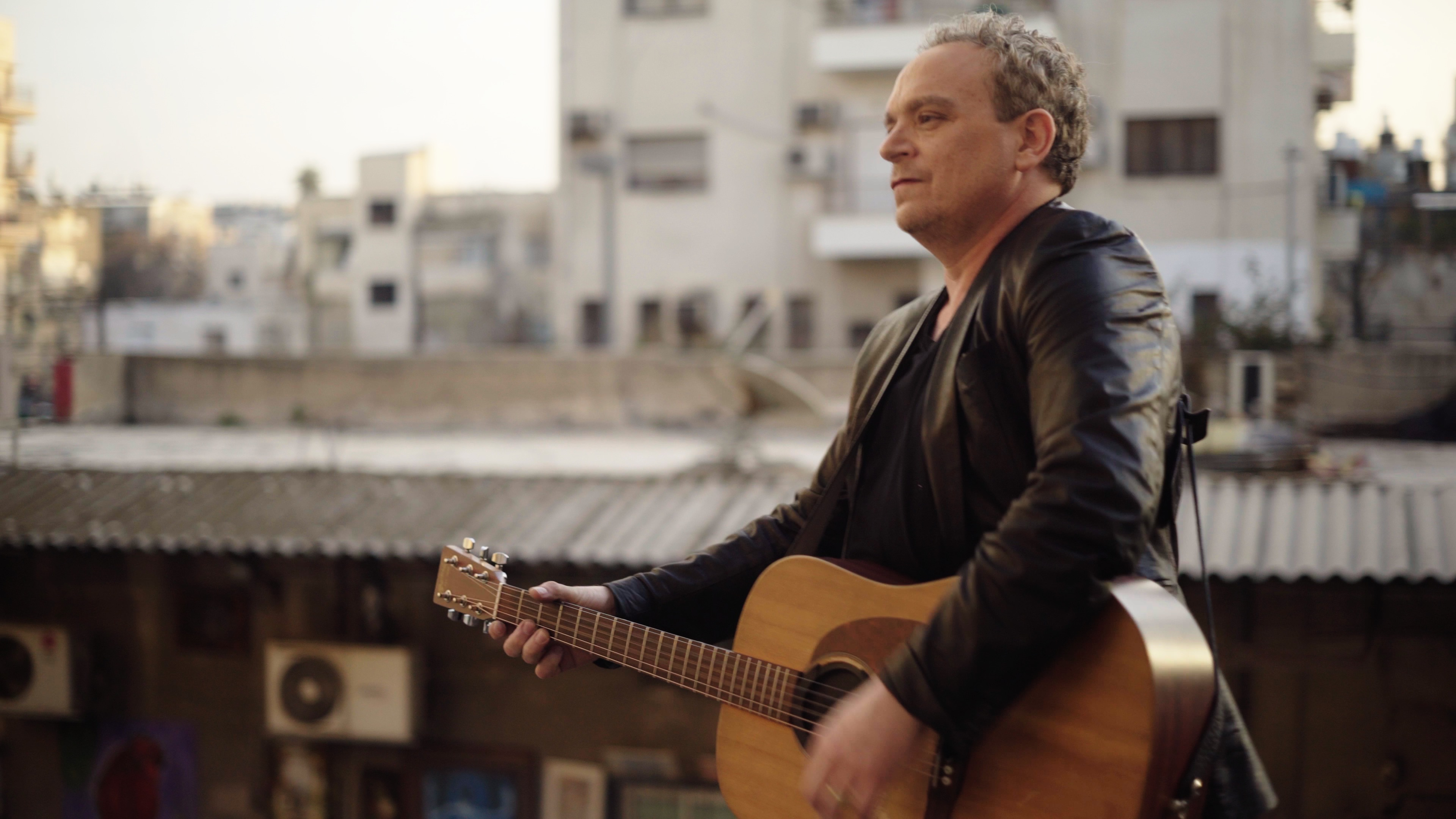
Shooting the Kfar Zarfati music video in Tel Aviv, 2017. Photo by Itai Raziel

- Izhar Ashdot – 1992
- Izhar Ashdot II – 1994
- Live at the Hard Rock Cafe – 1995
- Zman Kesem – 1999
- Lech Im HaLev – 2000
- BeMerhak Negi'a MiCan (A Touch Away) – 2005
- HaLeilot Shelanu (Our Nights) – 2007
- Live! - Rikud Katan - Hasivuv Ha'iri (Live – The "Irish" Tour) – 2008
- Inian Shel Hergel (A Matter of Habit) – 2012
- Solo. Live! – 2013
- Kach Holech Ha'Rooach (So Goes the Wind) – 2018
- Izhar Ashdot and Fellow Travelers – 2023

=== Personnel ===
Some of the musicians who played on Izhar's albums and in his live band:

- Raviv Gazit (Keyboards and Arrangement) 1991–1992
- Tzuf Philiosof (Bass Guitar and Vocals) 1980 –
- Eran Porat (Drums) 1992–2004
- Shay Baruch (Drums) 2004 –
- Tal Bergman (Drums) – Studio 1993–2005, 2017
- Yossi Fine (Bass) – Studio 1993–1994
- Ran Efron (Keyboards and Guitar) 1994 – 2019
- Moshe Levy (Keyboards and Production) 1993–
- Peter Roth (musician) (Guitar, Bass and Vocals) – Studio 2004 –, Live 2015 –
- Ehud Nathan (Buzuki, Mandolin, Whistle, Bohron) – "Irish" Tour 2008–2014
- Dinah Luria (Violin) – "Irish" Tour 2008 – 2019
- Carmel Eckman (Vocal and Violin) - Izhar's live band 2019 -
- Ofir Kaner (Keyboards) - Izhar's live band 2019 -
