= Eitan Haber =

Israeli journalist and publicist (1940–2020)

- איתן הבר
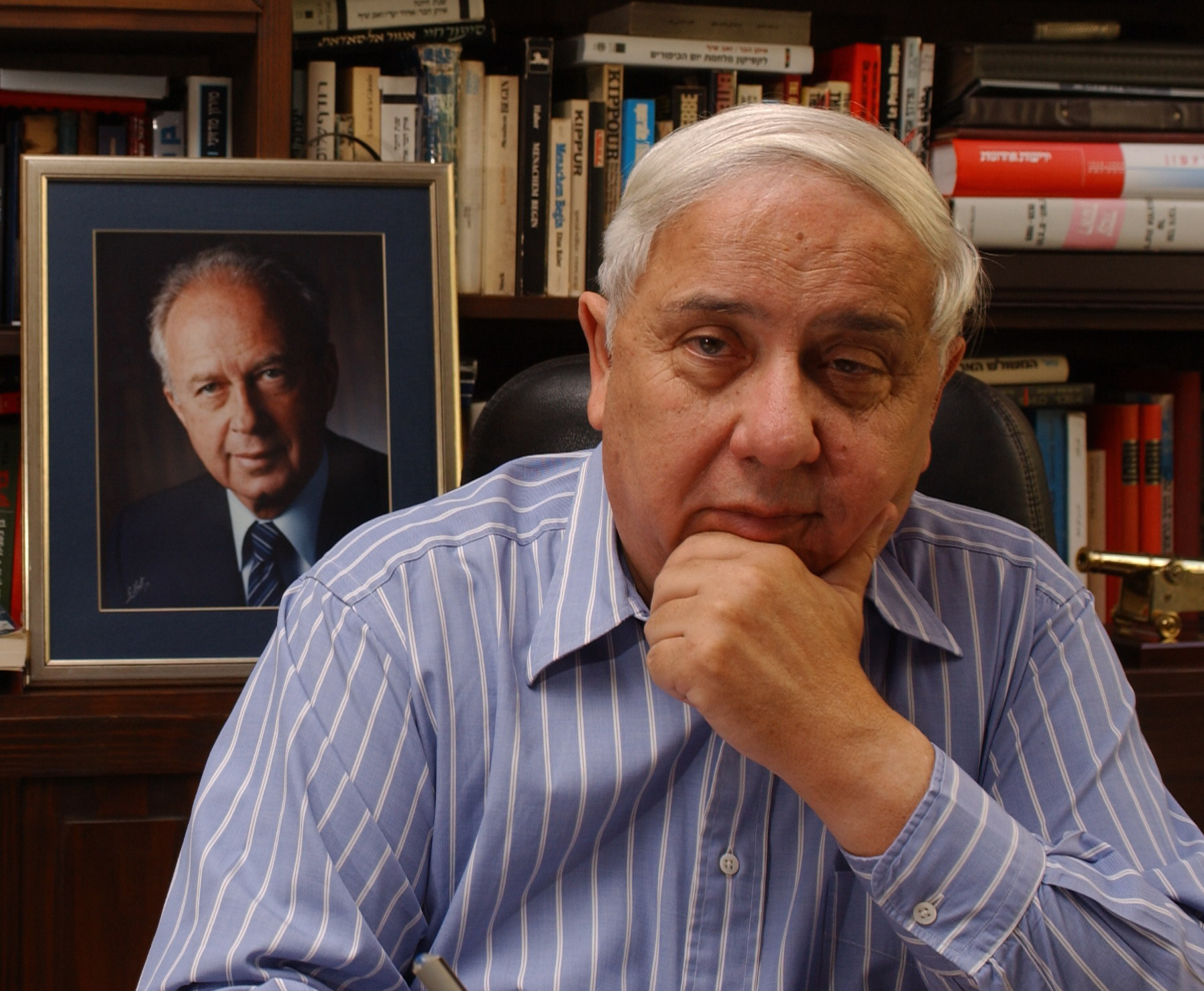
- Eitan Haber, with a portrait of Yitzhak Rabin behind him
- Born: March 12, 1940; Tel Aviv, Mandatory Palestine
- Died: October 7, 2020 (aged 80); Ramat Gan, Israel
- Occupations: Journalist, writer, publicist
- Years active: 1954–2020
- Children: 3

Eitan Haber (Hebrew: איתן הבר; 12 March 1940 – 7 October 2020) was an Israeli journalist and publicist, known for his writing on military and security issues, and for his longtime association with the late Israeli Prime Minister Yitzhak Rabin.

== Biography ==
Eitan Haber was born in Tel Aviv. He came from a Revisionist Zionist family. When he was eleven, he secretly joined the Betar youth movement but when his father found out, he was furious. At that point, he joined the religious Tzofim.

== Journalism and media career ==
In 1958 he was drafted into the Israel Defense Forces and was posted as a reporter for the Bamahane military newspaper. During his service he met and befriended the commander of the Northern Command, Yitzhak Rabin.

On his discharge from the IDF in 1960, he joined Yedioth Ahronoth as a correspondent on military issues. He was also an investigator for several Israeli television programs and edited and presented radio programs on Israel Army Radio.

In late 1985 he was appointed by Rabin, then Minister of Defense, to be his special media adviser. After Rabin's withdrawal from the government in 1990, he returned to Yedioth Ahronoth. When Rabin was elected Prime Minister in 1992, he was appointed to be an adviser and bureau chief. He wrote many of Rabin's speeches, was part of the team that secretly negotiated the Israel–Jordan Treaty of Peace, and organized Rabin's official travels abroad, including to the Oslo Accords and Rabin's reception of the Nobel Peace Prize.

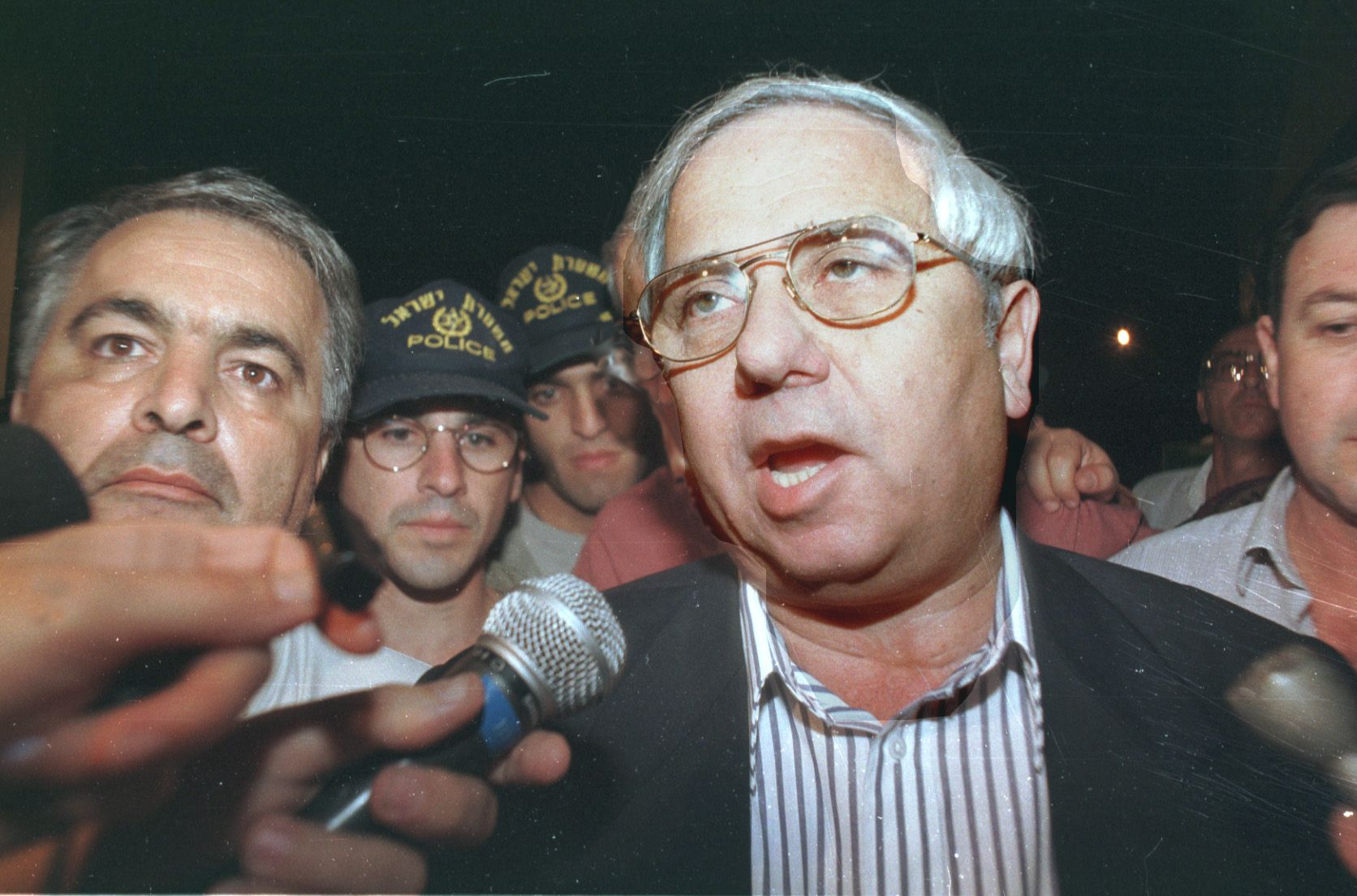
Haber announcing to the media that Prime Minister Rabin had died

Eitan Haber in Rabin's funeral, holding the blood-stained sheet of paper with the lyrics to the well-known Israeli song "Shir LaShalom"

On the night of 4 November 1995, he delivered the official government statement regarding Rabin's death:

The government of Israel announces in dismay, in great sadness, and in deep sorrow, the death of prime minister and minister of defence Yitzhak Rabin, who was murdered by an assassin, tonight in Tel Aviv. May his memory be blessed.

After Rabin's death, he returned to his journalistic career. He wrote several books and coauthored others with Michael Bar-Zohar, Ze'ev Schiff, Yossi Melman and Ehud Ya'ari.

== Business career ==
He was the president and CEO of Geopol Ltd. since 1996. Since 2001, he served as CEO of Kavim Ltd., and was a member of the board of directors of Africa Israel Ltd. and "Israel Experience Co." Since 2002, he was a director of Ampal Ltd. He was also a board member of the Jewish Agency for Israel.

== Death ==
In September 2019, Haber was diagnosed with colon cancer, which forced him to retire from Yedioth Ahronoth. He died on 7 October 2020 in Ramat Gan at the age of 80 following complications from the disease. He was also suffering from Parkinson's disease.

== Published works ==
- Porat, Yeshayahu Ben; Eitan Haber; Zeev Schiff (1977). Entebbe Rescue. Delacorte Press. pp. 346. ISBN 0-440-02162-6.
- Haber, Eitan (1978). Menahem Begin: The Legend and the Man. Delacorte Press. pp. 321. ISBN 0-440-05553-9.
- Haber, Eitan; Zeev Schiff; Ehud Yaari (1979). The Year of the Dove. Bantam Books. p. 312.
- Bar-Zohar, Michael; Eitan Haber (1983). The Quest for the Red Prince. Weidenfeld and Nicolson. p. 232.
- Michael Bar-Zohar and Eitan Haber (1983) Massacre in Munich Lyons Press, ISBN 1-59228-945-2

== See also ==
- Journalism in Israel
