= Moti Taka =

Israeli singer of Mizrahi music

Moti Taka מוטי טקה
- Born: January 3, 1997 (age 29); Kiryat Bialik, Israel
- Origin: Kiryat Bialik, Israel
- Genres: Mizrahi pop,
- Instruments: Vocals
- Years active: 2013–present

Moti Taka (Hebrew: מוטי טקה; born on March 1, 1997) is an Israeli singer of Mizrahi music.

== Early life ==
Taka was born in Kiryat Bialik to a large Ethiopian Jewish family. His family originally immigrated from Ethiopia in 1989. Prior to singing, he worked at a falafel stand.

== Career ==
Taka released his first song Tagid Li in 2013. His big breakout came in 2017 after the release of the single Balbale which received over 12 million views on Youtube. He was chosen as Breakout of the Year for 2017 by the Israeli Annual Hebrew Song Chart. In 2018 he released the song Tukur which was the official song for the Israeli Pride Parade in 2018. His first album titled Balbale was released in 2018.
