= Yishai Levi =

Israeli Mizrahi music singer (1963–2026)

Yishai Levi ישי לוי
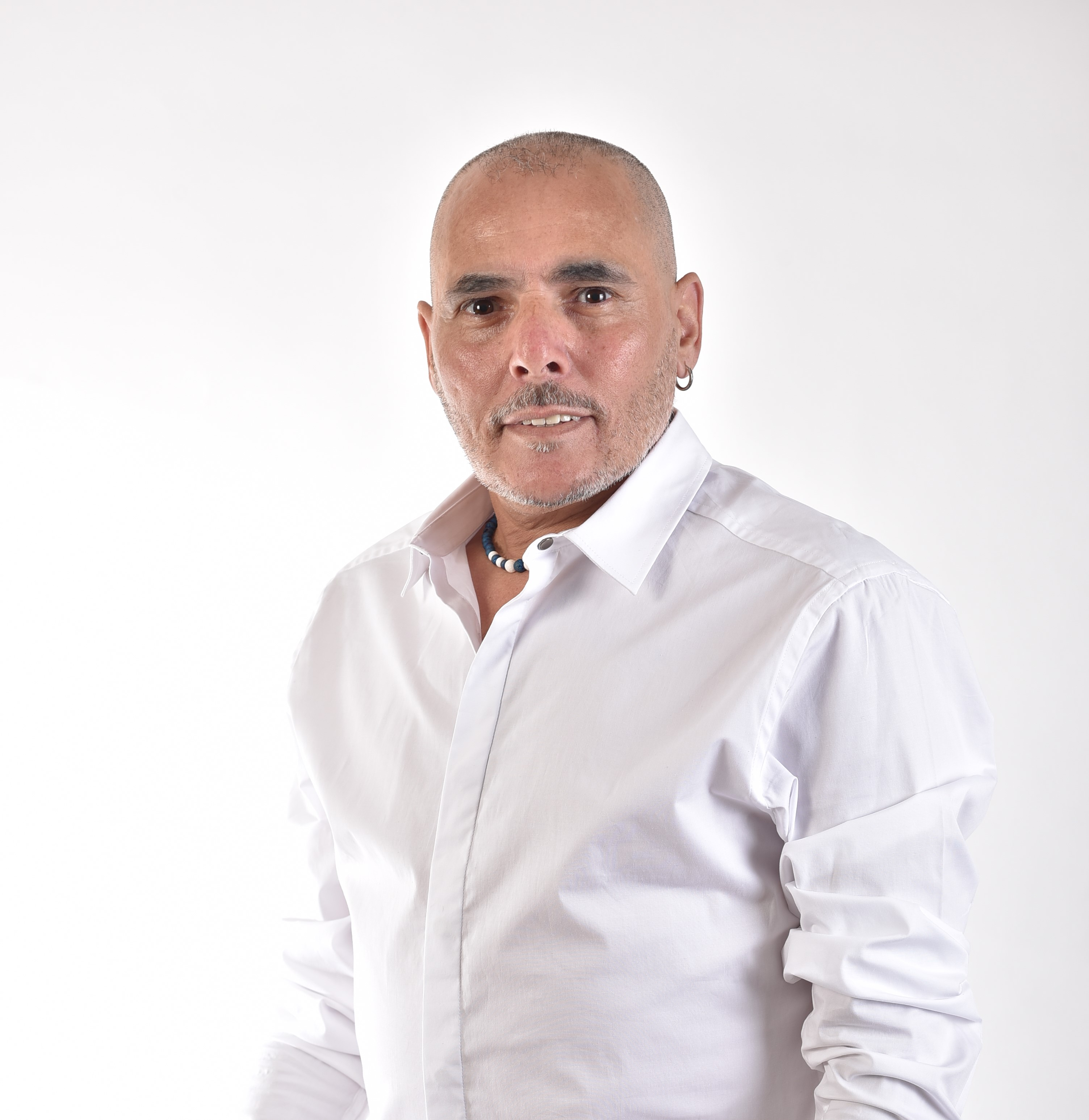
- Levi in 2022

Background information
- Born: 20 January 1963; Rosh HaAyin, Israel
- Origin: Rosh HaAyin, Israel
- Died: 7 June 2026 (aged 63) Jerusalem, Israel
- Genres: Mizrahi
- Occupation: Singer
- Instrument: Vocals
- Years active: 1983–2026

Yishai Levi, also Ishay Levi (Hebrew: ישי לוי; 20 January 1963 – 7 June 2026) was an Israeli singer of Mizrahi music, prominent for his vocal talent and troubled life.

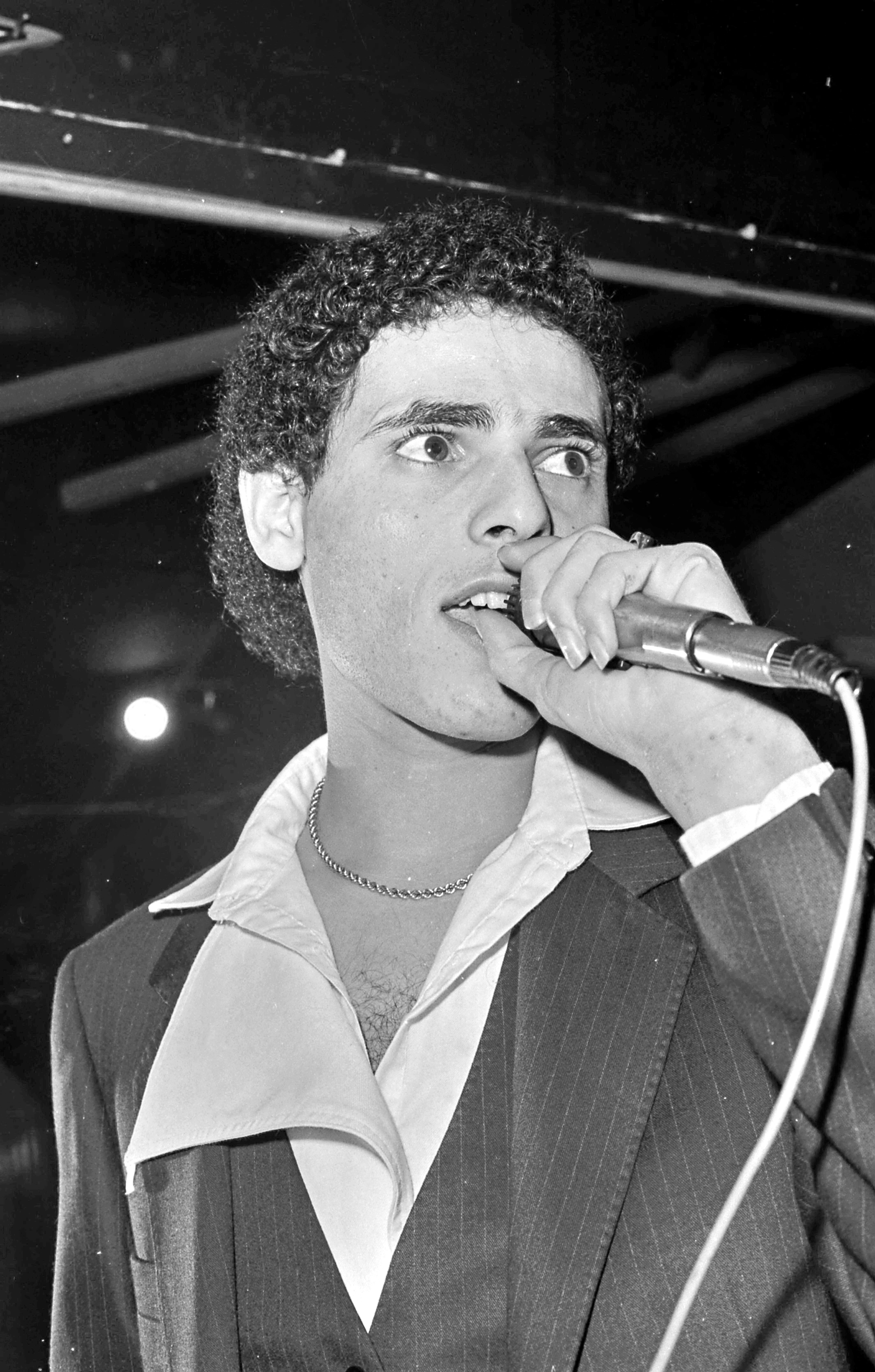
Levi performing live, 1985

== Early life ==
Yishai Levi was born on 20 January 1963 to a family of Yemenite Jews in Rosh HaAyin, Israel. His brother is the Mizrahi musician and singer Nati Levi.. Yishai Levi began singing in clubs in 1983, when singers like Zohar Argov and Haim Moshe were at the peak of their careers. Here he was discovered by the guitarist Moshe Ben-Moshe.

== Career ==
Levi produced his first album, Hafla With Ben Moshe in 1986. He became a superstar in clubs all over Israel. After this he released his first song in the album Hiney Ba Ha-yom (Here Comes the Day); then the song "Raiya" brought him fame. It was at this time that he and Zohar Argov began a personal rivalry. The album was released in 1987.

Levi's career began to fade in 1988–1991 due to his drug habits. In 1992, he released the album Lehat'chil Mibereshit (To Start From the Beginning) with the hits "Rikdi" (one of the biggest hits in Mizrahi music) and "Mona." Later, Levi released the albums Elem hamudot (Lovely Lad) in 1993, and Mabit mehatzad (Watch from the Side) in 1994, which were less successful, although the first album produced two hits, "Elem hamudot" and "Mi li tomar."

In 1995 he released the album Bat almavet (Immortal). The entire album was a collection of Boaz Sharabi covers, except for the title song. This album was not a success and Levi's popularity started to fade again. Then in 1997, he released the album Ha-emuna (The Belief), which again saved his career as a singer with the hit "Taltalim sh'chorim."

In 1997, he released the album Zirat hayi (Live at the Arena), but this was not a commercial success. In 2000, he released the album Panim l'atid (Face to the Future).

At the end of 2000, Levi served time for breaking into a neighbor's apartment and stealing electrical appliances to buy drugs. He was released from jail in 2003.

In 2004, Levi published the album N'tiv y'suray (Route of My Suffering). After this album, Levi did a show dedicated to his wife called Ani shar lach Iris (I Sing for You, Iris). Levi was sent back to jail after setting his wife's house on fire when she refused to give him money for drugs. He was released in 2006.

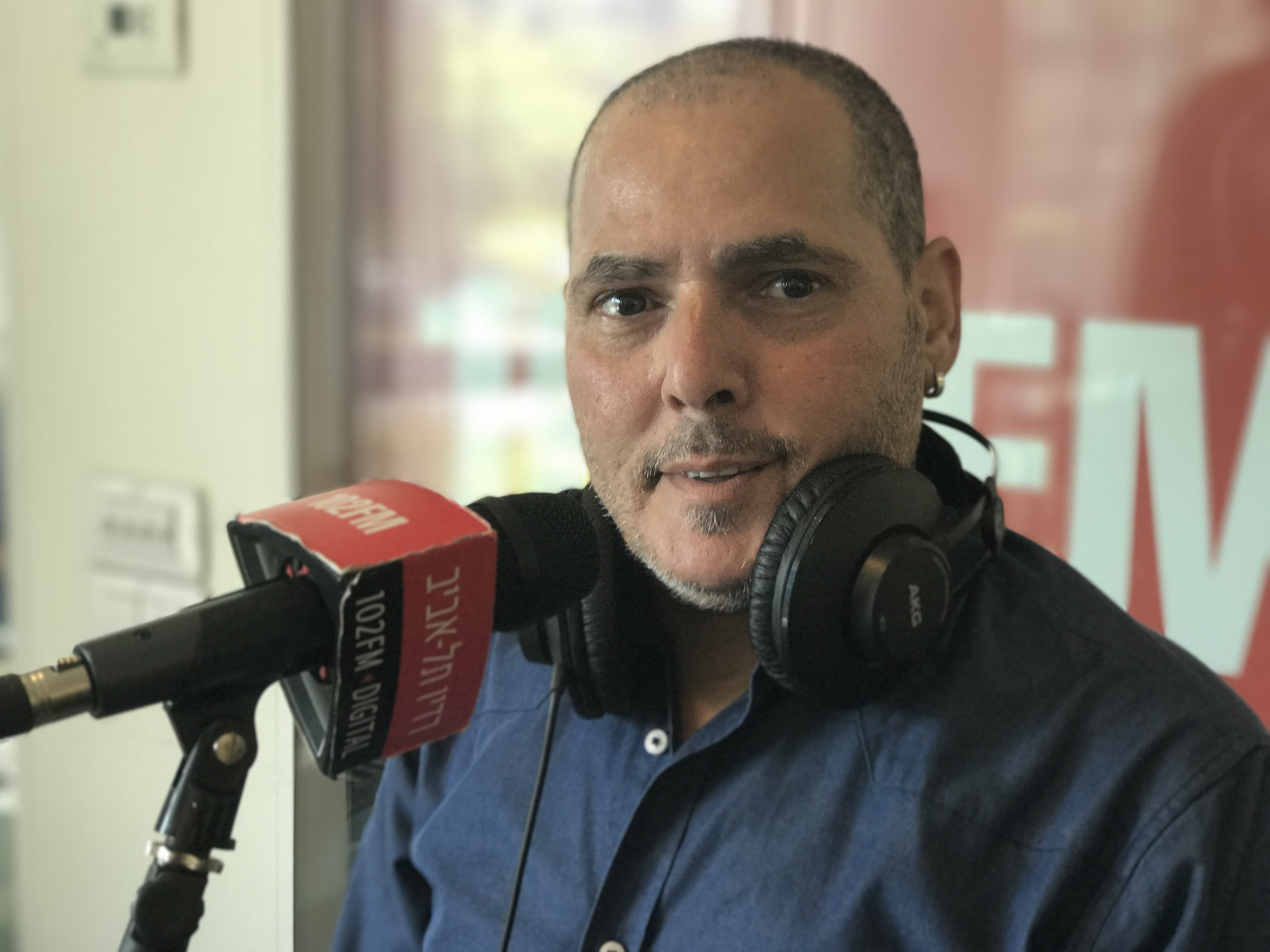

In 2008, Levi had a career boost with the album Rikud romanti (Romantic Dance), which included the eponymous hit as well as "Rotse otach balayla" (I Want You at Night), "Isha ne'emena" (Loyal Woman) and the Arabic hit "Ah ya albi" (Oh My Heart).

In 2021, Levi told Ynet television regarding the recent outbreak of violence between Israel and Gaza-based militant groups: "I want to tell Israeli soldiers and the government, don't stop until you finish the job."

== Death ==
Levi died aged 63 in Jerusalem on 7 June 2026, shortly after his family announced he was hospitalized in serious condition. Levi had chronic obstructive pulmonary disease (COPD) following a vehicle collision in 2005.
