= Ratziti Sheteda =

1977 Hebrew song by Uzi Hitman

Single by Uzi Hitman

from the album I Was Born for Peace
- Language: Hebrew
- English title: I Wanted You to Know
- Written: 1979
- Released: 1979
- Genre: Children's music
- Length: 2:58
- Label: Isradisc
- Songwriter: Uzi Hitman

Ratziti Sheteda (Hebrew: רציתי שתדע, I wanted you to know) is an Israeli song written and composed by Uzi Hitman. The song is also widely known as "Elohim Sheli" or "My God". It is of the prominent children's songs in Hebrew literature.

The song was written in 1979 and was included in Hitman's second album I was born for Peace, album dedicated to his son for hopes of peace at the time.

The song describes a boy's appeal to God, to tell about two dreams he had. In one of the dreams he saw an angel from heaven and in the other he saw a sailor, who rose from the depths of the sea. Both come to bless the children of the whole world with peace. At the end of the song, the boy discovers that there is still no peace in the world.

In 2004, the song was chosen as the most popular song from children's festivals in the Children's Festivals Parade organized by the website Ynet. In 2011, it was chosen as the favorite children's song in a parade organized by the Israel Hayom newspaper and the Channel 2 franchise Keshet.

In 2003, the hip-hop group Hadag Nahash made their own version of the song with additional lyrics.

== Lyrics sample ==
My God, I wanted you to know
A dream I dreamt last night in bed
And in the dream I saw an angel
From the heavens he came to me and said thus:
I have come from the heavens, I have traveled far,
To deliver a Blessing of Peace to all children
To deliver a Blessing of Peace to all children

And when I woke up I remembered the dream
And I went to look for Peace
And there was no angel and there was no peace
He was long gone and I was left with the dream

== See also ==
- List of anti-war songs
