= Uzi Hitman =

Israeli singer-songwriter (1952–2004)

Uzi Hitman עוזי חיטמן
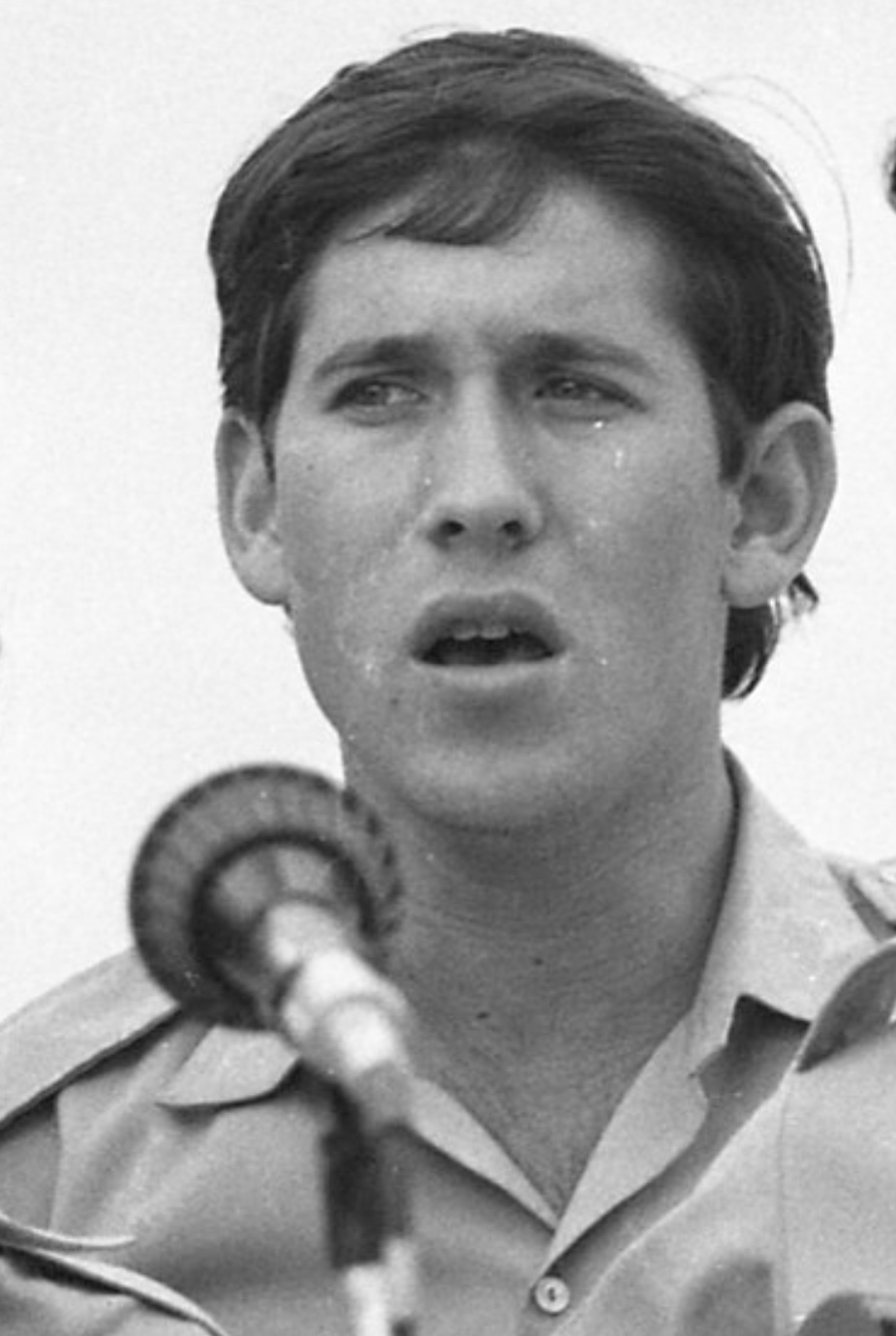
- Hitman in 1972

Background information
- Born: 9 June 1952; Giv'at Shmuel, Israel
- Died: 17 October 2004 (aged 52) Ramat Gan, Israel
- Genres: Israeli world music; rock; pop; mizrahi; children's music; hasidic
- Occupations: Singer-songwriter; composer; actor; director; television personality
- Instruments: Vocals; guitar; piano
- Years active: 1971–2004

Uzi Hitman (Hebrew: עוזי חיטמן; 9 June 1952 – 17 October 2004) was an Israeli singer-songwriter, composer, actor, director and television personality.

== Biography ==
Uzi Hitman was born in Giv'at Shmuel and lived all his life in Ramat Gan. His parents, Holocaust survivors, followed a traditionalist Jewish lifestyle; his father served as a cantor. He and his sibling Chaim, who lives in Ra'anana, attended secular schools. At home they listened to the Beatles, the Rolling Stones, Enrico Macias and opera along with liturgical and religious songs. When Hitman was 11, his parents gave him his first guitar, which he taught himself to play. When he turned 17, he received a piano from his grandmother. From 1971 to 1973, he served in the Central Command Band, along with Shem Tov Levy, Shlomo Bar-Aba, Dorit Reuveni and others. This marked the beginning of his musical career.

He was married to Aya (nee Waldman) and they had three children: Ido, Yoav and Oded.

== Music career ==
His post-military career began in 1973, when he wrote the anti-war song "Mi yada' sh'kach yihiye" ('Who Knew It Would Be Like This') for Boaz Sharabi. He became a popular Israeli artist during the 1980s and 1990s. He composed and wrote over 650 songs. His most famous songs include "Noladeti Lashalom" ('I Was Born for Peace'), "Ratziti Sheteda" ('I Wanted You to Know'), "Todah" ('Thank You'), "Mi Yada She'Kach Yieye" ('Who Knew It Would Be Like This') and "Kan" ('Here'), which reached third place during the 1991 Eurovision Song Contest. Hitman also appeared on the 1980s children's programmes Parpar Nechmad, Hopa Hei and Shirim K'tanim which was the first video set to be published in Israel in 1989. He also composed melodies for piyyutim such as Adon Olam in 1976.

Hitman was a devoted supporter of Maccabi Haifa, and even wrote its 1993–94 championship song named "Green in the Eyes", (ירוק בעיניים) which he gave to Haim Moshe. He also wrote and performed its 2001 championship song "Here She Rises", (הנה היא עולה).

== Death and commemoration ==
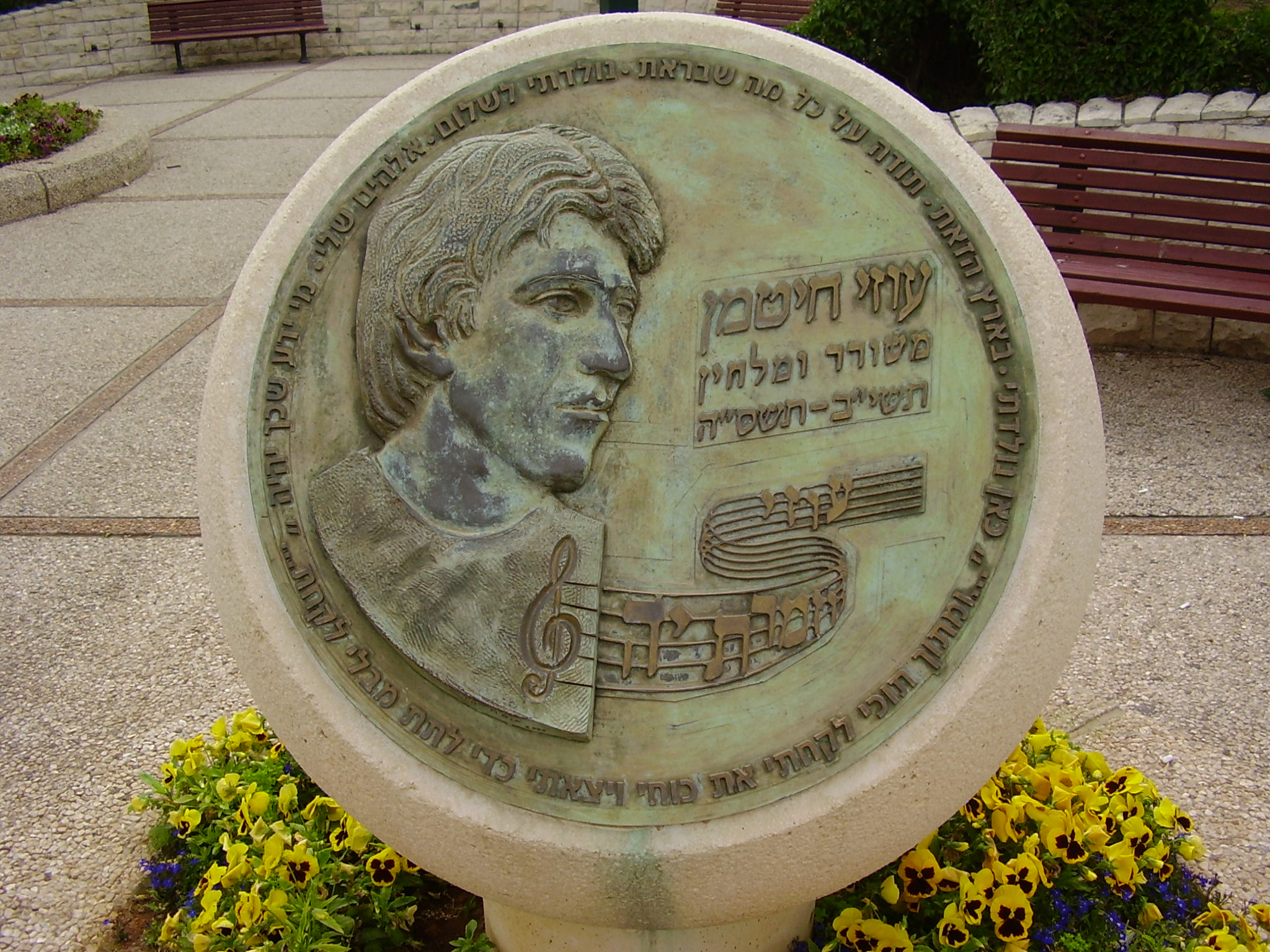
Hitman’s memorial in Ramat Gan

Hitman died following a heart attack in Ramat Gan on 17 October 2004 at the age of 52. Following a funeral in Ramat Gan, he was buried at the Yarkon Cemetery near Tel Aviv. The City of Ramat Gan renamed Kikar Hashoshanim ('Roses Square') in his neighborhood of residence to Kikar Hitman (Hitman Square).

On April 22 2009, the Israeli Stamp Service issued a series of 12 postal stamps on the subject of Israeli music. One of the stamps in this collection was dedicated in memory of Hitman. The stamp, with a portrait of Hitman, was designed by the artist Miri Nestor Sofer. The stamp's tab included a line from Hitman's song "Adon Olam" - "Lord of the world who reigned".

A minute of silence was given to Hitman during a Maccabi Haifa match against Bnei Yehuda, followed up by fans singing the chorus of the championship song he wrote for the club.

== See also ==
- Music of Israel
