= Noladeti Lashalom =

"Noladeti Leshalom"

Single by Sexta
- Language: Hebrew
- Released: 1979
- Songwriter: Uzi Hitman
- Composer: Uzi Hitman

"Noladeti Leshalom" (נוֹלַדְתִּי לַשָּׁלוֹם, lit. "I Was Born for Peace") is a song written and composed by Israeli singer-songwriter Uzi Hitman, and originally performed by the Israeli group Sexta. The song was released in 1979, 30 years after Israel's declaration of independence.

== Background ==
Uzi Hitman wrote the song to mark the birth of his son Ido, during the period of negotiations leading up to the signing of the Egypt–Israel peace treaty in 1979. The lyrics express a longing for peace at a time when the treaty with Egypt had not yet been finalized. The song was sung to Anwar Sadat with an additional verse in Arabic during his visit to Beersheba in may 1979. The song was translated to Arabic and sent to Saadat's wife, Jehan Sadat.

Although members of Sexta were initially reluctant to perform the song, feeling it did not align with their musical style, they ultimately performed it at the 1979 Israel Song Festival, where it placed fourth.

Hitman also recorded his own version of the song that same year as part of a compilation album titled Noladeti Leshalom.

In the Reshet Gimmel annual Hebrew song chart for 1979, the song ranked ninth, while it reached 22nd place in the Galei Tzahal chart.

In 1994, Hitman included a new version of the song on his album, Uzi Hitman Sings, featuring an additional verse in Arabic.

== Song analysis ==
The recurring chorus in the song hints at the symbolic connection between the birth of Hitman's son and the birth of peace during those days.

The song opens with a message of peace to the entire world – to all melodies, nations, languages, and to anyone who seeks peace.

The second verse alludes to the historical context – thirty years of waiting for peace that never materialized, turning peace into an unattainable dream. (Note: Thirty years refers to thirty years after Israel's declaration of independence, the time of the release of the song. At the time, Israel hasn't yet made peace with neighboring nations)

The third verse refers to the Jewish people's right ("a nation two thousand years old") to political sovereignty over a piece of land of their own ("reserved for her is land and a portion of sky"). Now, the nation’s dream of living in peace is close to being realized and seems like a new dawn ("behold, the day is rising"). (Note: Close to being realized since at the time of the song's release, the peace deal between Israel and Egypt was close to being finalized.)
