= Miri Aloni =

Israeli singer and actress (born 1949)

Miri Aloni מירי אלוני
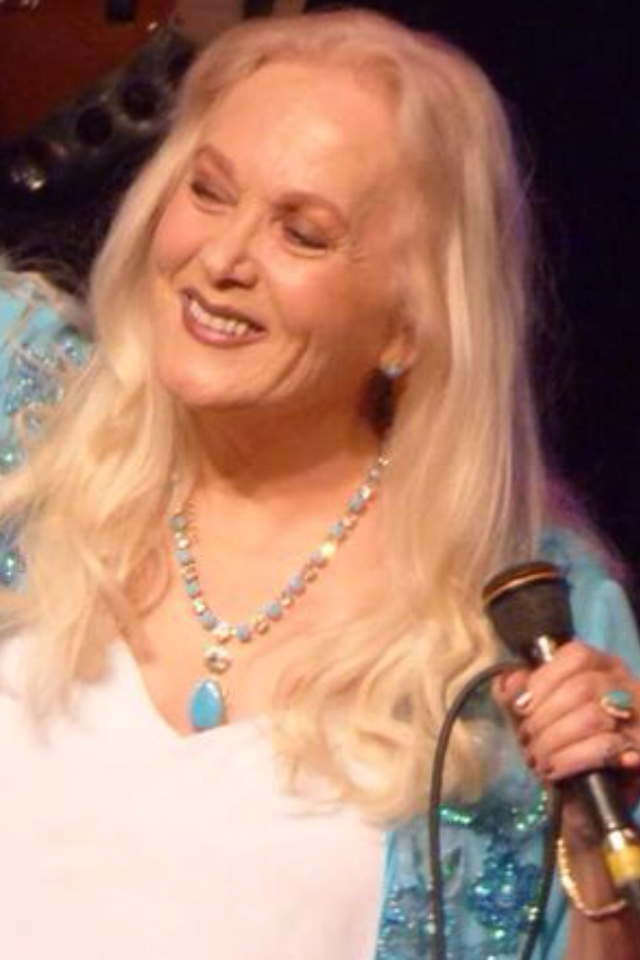
- Miri Aloni, Ein Gen Festival Ein Gev, 2014

Background information
- Born: December 25, 1949 (age 76); Givatayim, Israel
- Genres: Folk, Pop, Israeli music
- Occupation: Singer
- Instrument: Guitar
- Years active: 1968–present
- Formerly of: Apocolypse

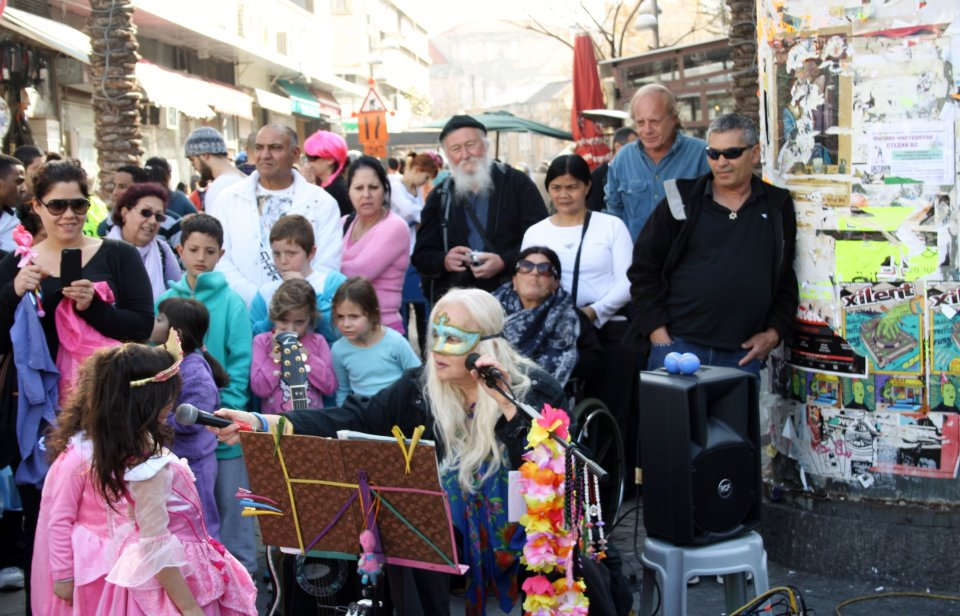
Street performance of Miri at Magen David Square by the Carmel Market, Tel Aviv, Purim 2012

Miri Aloni (Hebrew: מירי אלוני; born December 25, 1949) is an Israeli singer and actress. Already a popular singer, she became an iconic figure after singing "Shir Lashalom" ("Song for Peace") minutes before the assassination of Yitzhak Rabin in 1995.

== Biography ==
Aloni was born in Givatayim on December 25, 1949.

Aloni enlisted into the Israel Defense Forces in 1968, serving in the Nahal band. In the seventies and eighties she played in various bands, including Apocolypse, and had major roles in several movies and TV series.

Minutes before Prime Minister Yitzhak Rabin was murdered at a political rally in November 1995, Miri Aloni sang the song "Shir Lashalom" ("Song for Peace", of which she was the first performer). She said in an interview with Jewish Journal in 2009, "Since then, not one day in my life passes without someone saying something to me about this night. When people see me, they remember. They live this night again, and this tragedy and this crash, just like you did at this moment."

She lived in Germany from 1999 to 2002. In 2006, Nitzan Gilady made a video of her life: Singing to Oblivion – The Story of Miri Aloni.

In later years, she was known for her street performances at Carmel Market in Tel Aviv. She started doing this in 2003 as a protest against cuts in the governmental subsidies in culture, but, as she explained, she started enjoying this, because it breaks the distance between the singer and the people.

Her last husband was Samuel Omni, and they had two sons, Yirmi and Yossi.

In 2021 her leg was amputated after a severe infection, and she spent eight months in a hospital. After an interview, when she asked for help with funding her housing, the assisted housing network Mishan offered her free of charge accommodation in Ramat Ef'al for the rest of her life.

== Filmography ==
- Smart Gamaliel (1973)
- Marriage Tel Aviv Style (1979)
- Silent Love (1982)
- Ahava Ilimeth (1985)

She performed the theme songs of the TV series Hedva and Shlomik.

== Recordings ==
- "Mona Lisa of the Twentieth Century" (1973)
- "Women from Brecht"
- "Drop of Love (Ahava peep)" (1987)
- "A Little Bit of Love" (2002)
