= Shir LaShalom =

Israeli song originally performed by the Nahal band

Single by The Nahal Band

from the album In the Nahal settlements at the Sinai
- Language: Hebrew
- English title: A song for Peace
- Released: December 1969
- Genre: Israeli rock
- Length: 5:33.
- Label: Hed Arzi
- Composer: Yair Rosenblum
- Lyricist: Yaakov Rotblit

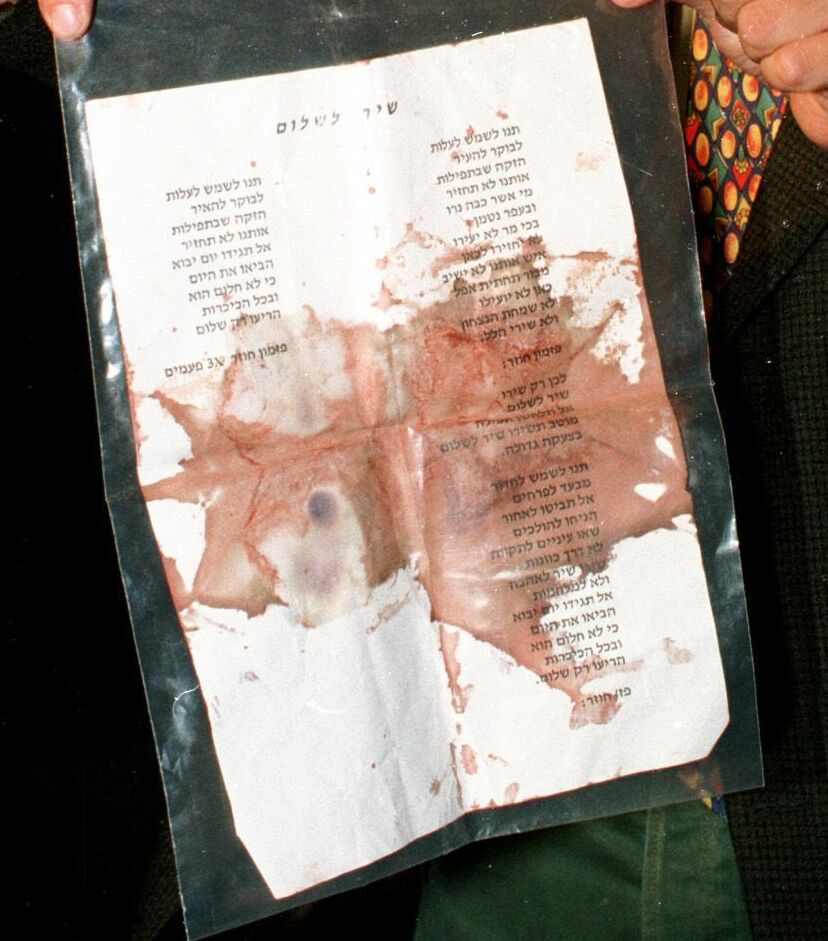
Blood-stained Shir LaShalom lyrics from which Yitzhak Rabin had read at a rally minutes before his assassination

Shir LaShalom (Hebrew: שיר לשלום, A Song for Peace) is a popular Israeli song that was first performed in 1969 by Lehakat HaNahal (להקת הנח"ל), a musical ensemble of the Israel Defense Forces. The song has since been widely associated with Israeli advocacy for a peaceful resolution of the Israeli-Palestinian conflict, including organizations advocating for a two-state solution such as Peace Now.

== History ==
Shir LaShalom was written by Yaakov Rotblit and set to music by Yair Rosenblum. It was first performed in 1969 by Lehakat HaNahal (להקת הנח"ל), a musical ensemble of the Israel Defense Forces, as part of its program In the Nahal Settlements of Sinai (היאחזות הנח"ל בסיני), which was released as an album in December 1969, during the War of Attrition between Israel and Egypt. The original recording featured several performers who later became prominent in Israeli entertainment, including soloist Miri Aloni and guitarist Danny Sanderson, whose electric guitar solo opens the song.

Rosenblum originally submitted the song to the Israeli Navy Ensemble (להקת חיל הים), on the condition that he would arrange it himself. When the ensemble’s musical director, Benny Nagari, declined, Rosenblum passed the song to Lehakat HaNahal, with which he had previously collaborated.

== Form and content ==
Both lyrically and musically, Shir LaShalom was influenced by Anglo-American anti-war folk-rock songs of the 1960s. The song conveys a message of longing for peace, mourning fallen soldiers while expressing a desire to speak on their behalf. Its lyrics challenge aspects of Israeli commemorative culture, including the valorization of war and the emphasis on bereavement. One line—"The purest of prayers will not bring us back" (הזכה שבתפילות אותנו לא תחזיר, hazakah shebatfilot otanu lo takhzir)—has been interpreted as questioning the efficacy or relevance of traditional mourning rituals such as the recitation of the Kaddish prayer. Another line—"Let the sun penetrate through the flowers [on the graves]" (תנו לשמש לחדור מבעד לפרחים, tnu lashemesh lakhador miba'ad la-prakhim)—has similarly been read as a critique of memorial practices.

The song also employs military imagery in order to subvert it, as in the line "Lift your eyes in hope, not through [gun] sights" (שאו עיניים בתקווה, לא דרך כוונות, s'u 'enayim betikvah, lo derekh kavanot). Its lyrics stand in contrast to earlier Israeli songs that have been seen as reinforcing a militaristic ethos, such as Natan Alterman's Magash HaKesef ("Silver Platter") and songs like Ammunition Hill and Balada Laḥovesh ("Ballad for a Corpsman"), the latter two also composed by Yair Rosenblum.

One line in the song—“Sing a song to love, and not to wars” (שירו שיר לאהבה, ולא למלחמות, shiru shir la'ahavah, velo lamilkhamot)—originally read “...and not to victories” (...ולא לניצחונות, velo lanitsakhonot). The original version contrasted love and peace with military success. However, because the song was intended for performance by a military ensemble, the head of the IDF Education Corps at the time requested a change, arguing that the original wording could negatively affect soldiers' morale. The line was revised, and the song was recorded and published with the word “wars” (milkhamot) replacing “victories” (nitsakhonot).

The song’s anthem-like quality is emphasized through both its tempo and its frequent use of Hebrew imperative plural forms, such as הביאו (havi'u, “bring”) and הריעו (hari'u, “cheer”), particularly in the final verse. These grammatical forms function as calls to action. The song's tone and message have often been linked to the broader countercultural and anti-war movements of the 1960s, and it resonated with segments of the Israeli public who supported a more peace-oriented outlook.

Last verse
Hebrew

אל תגידו יום יבוא,
הביאו את היום!
כי לא חלום הוא.
ובכל הכיכרות,
הריעו לשלום!

Transliteration

al tagidu yom yavo
havi'u et hayom!
ki lo khalom hu.
uvekhol hakikarot,
hari'u lashalom!

Translation

Don't say the day will come,
Bring the day about!
For it is not a dream.
And in all the city squares,
Cheer for peace!

== Reception ==
Eitan Haber in Rabin's funeral, reading the song from Rabin's blood-stained sheet of paper.

From its initial release, Shir LaShalom generated controversy. While many listeners identified with its message promoting peace, others viewed it as politically contentious. Some commentators noted thematic parallels between the song and Yitzhak Rabin’s Mount Scopus speech of June 28, 1967. In that speech, Rabin—then recently chief of staff during the Six-Day War—acknowledged the personal cost of war, recognizing both Israeli casualties and the suffering of opposing forces.

The song's release came during a period following Israel’s victory in the Six-Day War, at a time when public sentiment included a heightened sense of Israeli nationalism. Against that backdrop, some perceived the song as defeatist. Its perceived criticism of a prevailing "culture of bereavement" led to strong reactions; certain military officials considered its content inappropriate for soldiers. In 1969, Rehavam Ze'evi, then head of the IDF's Central Command, prohibited Lehakat HaNahal from performing the song in his jurisdiction, a position echoed by Ariel Sharon, then commander of the IDF’s Southern Command.

Over time, Shir LaShalom became associated with Israeli political groups advocating for a negotiated peace, particularly those supporting a two-state solution. It was adopted by the Peace Now movement and is frequently performed at their rallies and public events, occasionally in Arabic translation. During the 1996 Israeli elections, the Meretz party acquired the rights to use the song in its campaign and modified the first line—changing "Let the sun rise" (תנו לשמש לעלות, tnu lashemesh la'alot) to "Let Meretz rise" (תנו למרצ לעלות, tnu leMeretz la'alot), incorporating it into their campaign slogan.

On November 4, 1995, Shir LaShalom was performed at the conclusion of a peace rally in Tel Aviv, led by Miri Aloni, the musical groups Gevatron and Irusim, and joined by then-Prime Minister Yitzhak Rabin and Foreign Minister Shimon Peres. Minutes after the rally ended, Rabin was assassinated by Yigal Amir. A copy of the song’s lyrics, stained with his blood, was found in his jacket pocket.

The song was later included in the 2000 memorial album O Captain (Hebrew: רַב־חוֹבֵל Rav Ḥovel) dedicated to Rabin’s memory, and it continues to be performed at commemorative ceremonies marking his death. In a 1998 national poll conducted during the State of Israel’s 50th anniversary celebrations to determine the country’s most significant song, Shir LaShalom placed third.

== See also ==
- Music of Israel
- Culture of Israel
- List of anti-war songs
- Protest song

== Bibliography ==
- Edelman, Marsha Bryan (2003). Discovering Jewish Music. Philadelphia: Jewish Publication Society. ISBN 978-0827608573.
- Eliram, Talila (2006). 'Come, Thou Hebrew Song': The Songs of the Land of Israel – Musical and Social Aspects [בוא, שיר עברי : שירי ארץ ישראל, היבטים מוזיקליים וחברתיים] (in Hebrew). Haifa: Haifa University Press. ISBN 965-311-066-7.
- Regev, Motti; Seroussi, Edwin (2004). Popular Music and National Culture in Israel. Berkeley: University of California Press. p. 106. ISBN 978-0-520-23652-3.
- Tessler, Shmulik (2007). Songs in Uniform : The Military Entertainment Troupes of the Israel Defense Forces [הזכות הגדולה לומר לא - שירה פוליטית בישראל] (in Hebrew). Jerusalem: Yad Ben-Zvi.
- Vinitzky-Seroussi, Vered (2010). Yitzhak Rabin's Assassination and the Dilemmas of Commemoration. Albany: SUNY Press. ISBN 978-1438428321.
