= Yair Nitzani =

Israeli musical artist

Yair Nitzani יאיר ניצני
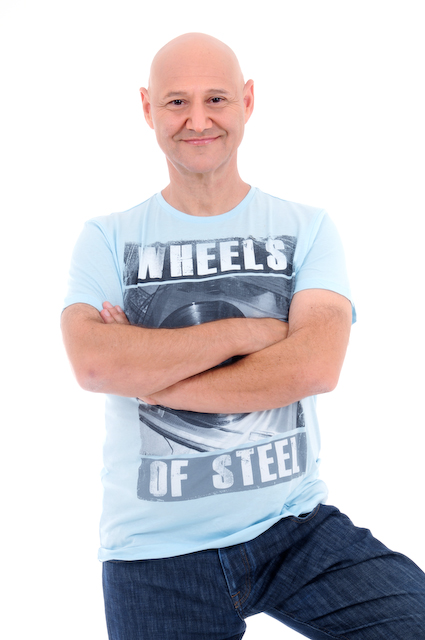

Background information
- Born: August 22, 1958 (age 68)
- Origin: Israel
- Genres: Pop rock
- Occupations: Record producer, comedian, musician
- Instruments: Keyboards, vocals
- Years active: 1975–present
- Label: CBS
- Website: yairnitzani.com

Yair Nitzani (Hebrew: יָאִיר נִיצָּנִי; born August 22, 1958) is an Israeli musician, songwriter, TV host and comedian.

== Early life ==
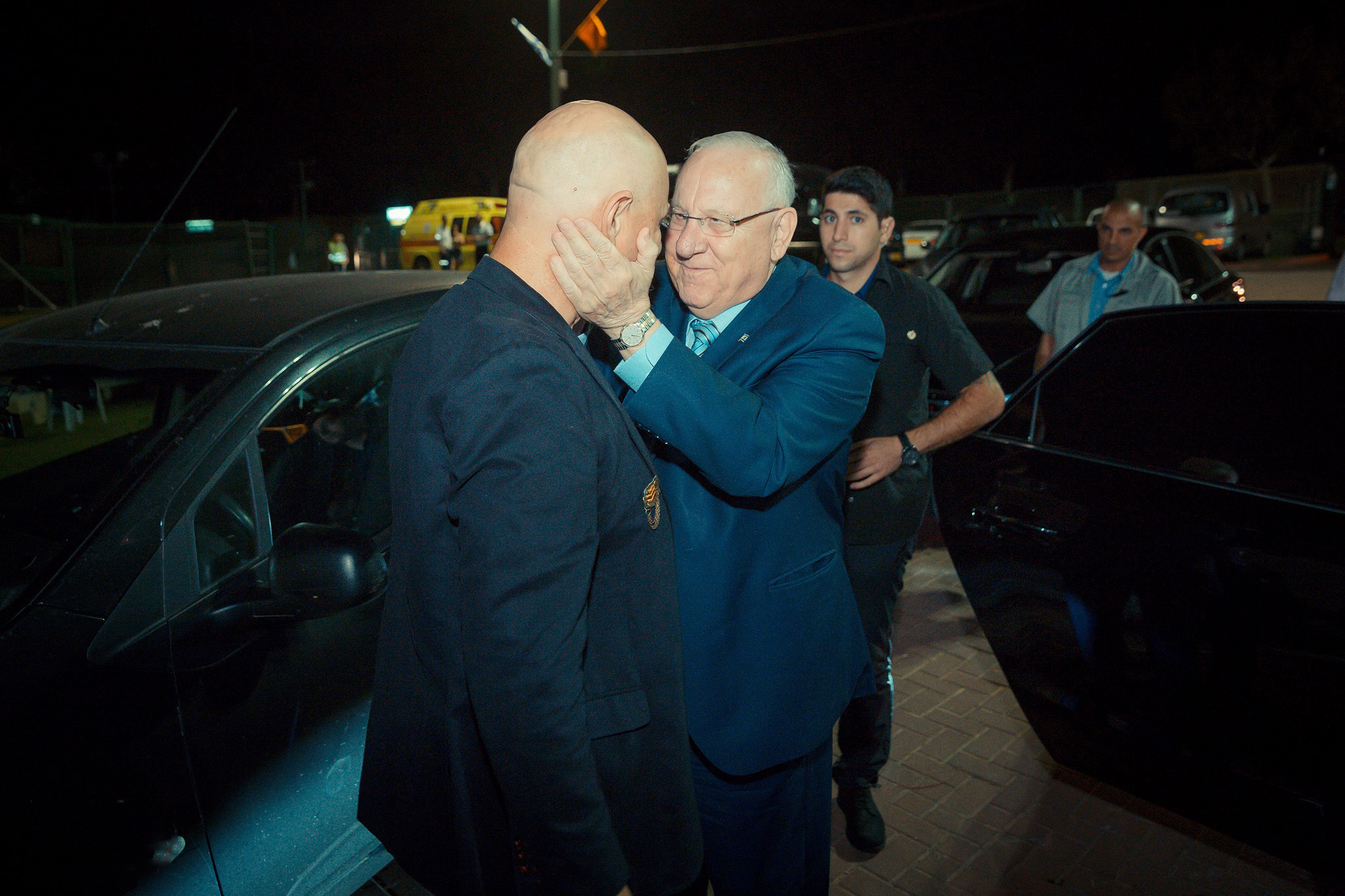
President of Israel Ruvi Rivlin and Yair Nitzani

Yair Nitzani was born in Beersheba in 1958. He is of Italian-Jewish descent. After serving in the Israel Defense Forces as a broadcaster on Galei Zahal in the 1980s, he joined the rock group T-Slam as a keyboardist and songwriter. Nitzani wrote some of the band's most famous songs, among them "Radio Chazak" (Loud Radio), "Partzufa Shel HaMdina" (The Country's Face), "Tnu Li Rokenrol" (Give Me Rock n' Roll), "Od Pgisha" (Another Date) "Chatzavim Porchim" (The Sea Squills are Blooming), and LirOt Ota Hayom (See Her Today). His identifying mark in the band was a faucet glued to his forehead.

== Career ==
After T-Slam disbanded, Nitzani joined Erez Tal and Avri Gilad on the show Ma Yesh (What's Up) on Israeli Army Radio, and joined HaOlam HaErev (The World Tonight) on Israeli Channel 2.

As CEO of the Hed Artzi recording company, he discovered new musical talent in Israel, such as the band Ha-Chaverim shel Natasha and the singer Adam. It was Nitzani's idea to mix Ofra Haza's Yemenite songs with a modern beat. He persuaded Izhar Ashdot to produce Galbi and Im Ninalu.

Nitzani was voted to the board of directors of Acum (Israel's copyright society). In 2002, he was a consultant of content to Comverse. He was an adviser to Tunewiki, a leading app for lyrics.

As a solo artist, he gained fame with his comedic hip hop song "Hashem Tamid" and a parody version of Brother Louie by Modern Talking called "Shir Hamangal" (The Barbecue Song) with the actress Gani Tamir.

From 2003 to 2005, Nitzani wrote and hosted three seasons of Ahorei HaChadashot (literally, "The Behind of the News") on Israeli Channel 10.

He is the owner of a music company, Yair Nitzani Music.

In February 2011, Nitzani was scheduled to join the judges of the reality show Kokhav Nolad, the Israeli version of American Idol.

Nitzani is the host of Yanshufim on channel 8 on Israeli cable TV. It was named the best TV show of 2011 and 2012. He is the host of A Bit High, a weekly culture show on channel 10 in Israel. He also wrote a weekly satiric column for Israel Today, Israel's most popular newspaper, until announcing that his column on August 24, 2023 would be his final one.

== Books ==
- Merim Gaba, 2014
- Kefesa Me'ha'shigaon, 2025

== Discography ==
- T-Slam – Loud Radio
- T-Slam – T-Slam 2
- T-Slam – For Collectors Only
- T-Slam with the Symphonic Orchestra of Rishon le Zion, live

=== Singles ===
- "Hashem Tamid" and "Shir Hamangal"
- "Rakevet HaEmek"
- "Shiro Shel Shafshaf" (performed by Meir Banai, lyrics by Nitzani)

== Filmography ==
- Shovrim, directed by Avi Nesher (1984)
- Avoda BaEnaim, directed by Yigal Shilon (1989)
- Kvod HaShagrir (1997)

== See also ==
- Music of Israel
- Culture of Israel
