= Danni Bassan =

20th and 21st-century Israeli singer

Antonio Danni Bassan אנטוניו דני בסן
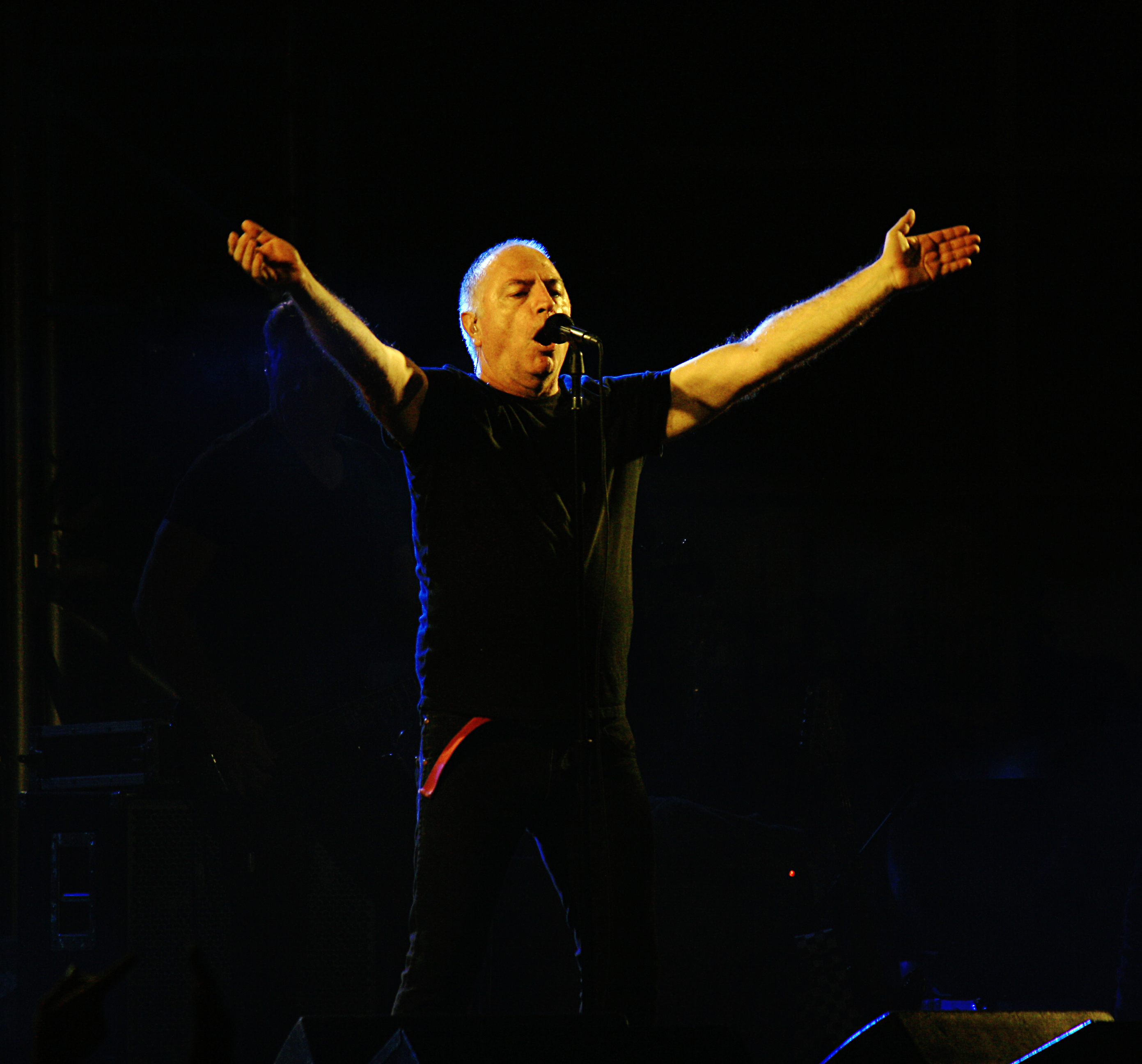
- Danny Bassan during a concert in Rishon LeZion, 2013.

Background information
- Born: December 5, 1955 (age 70); São Paulo, Brazil
- Genres: Rock; Pop
- Occupations: Singer, voice actor
- Years active: 1974-present
- Labels: With T-Slam: NMC Records; CBS; Solo: Israphone Records; Hed Artzi

Antonio Danni Bassan (Hebrew: אנטוניו דני בסן; born December 5, 1955) is an Israeli musician.

== Biography ==
Bassan is the son of Dragomir Bassan (1930-2009, São Paulo), born in Sofia, Bulgaria and Judith Rosenbusch Bassan (1921-1976, Qiryat Gat), born in Munich.

His mother left Nazi Germany when the World War II started, but her parents and siblings died in The Holocaust.

When aged 18, he was recruited to the Israeli Air Force Band. Bassan was known as a member of the band T-Slam, and was main vocalist in it until its disbandment in 1983.

In 1985 Bassan released a self-titled album. His second album, HaYeled Shebi (The Kid Inside Me), was released in 1989. This album included the song Darkenu (Our Way, דרכינו) which later became a hit, as a theme for the Israeli TV-show HaBurganim. In 1992, his last album was released, Chalom Shiheha. Since T-Slam dissolved, Bassan worked on recording jingles, commercials, and dubbing voices.

== Discography ==
=== With T-Slam ===
- Radio Chazak – Loud Radio (1981)
- T-Slam2 (1982, NMC Records)
- LeAsfanim Bilvad – For Collectors Only (1983, CBS Records)

== Personal life ==
He is married to Hagit Bassan (née Tsivner). They have 3 sons, who are triplets.

=== Solo albums ===
- Danny Bassan (1986, Israphone Records)
- HaYeled Shebi (1989, Hed Artzi Records)
- Chalom Shiheha (1992, Hed Artzi Records)
- MeAz SheHitahavnu (2005, Hed Arzi)
