= T-Slam =

Israeli rock band

T-Slam תיסלם
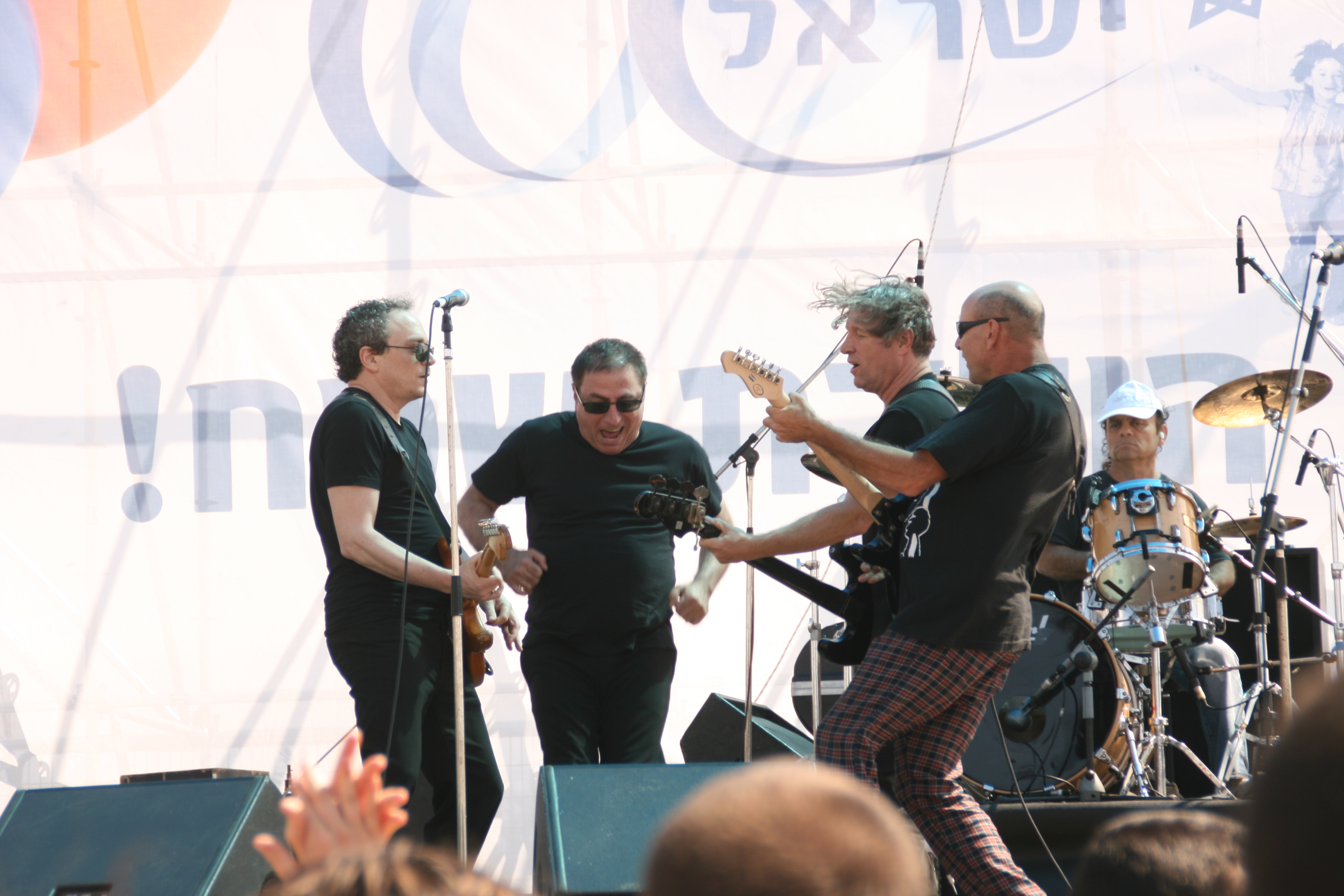
- Tislam during a performance on the Achziv beach at the celebration of 60 to Israel.

Background information
- Origin: Tel Aviv, Israel
- Genres: Hard rock, glam rock, rock, pop rock
- Years active: 1980–1983; Reunion tours: 1990; 2002–2003; 2009–2010
- Labels: CBS; NMC
- Past members: Danni Bassan; Izhar Ashdot; Yair Nitzani; Yoshi Sade; Tzuf Philosof; Sami Avzardel
- Website: Official site (Hebrew)

T-Slam (also Tislam, Hebrew: תיסלם) was an influential Israeli rock band, founded in 1980 by Dani Bassan, Izhar Ashdot and Yair Nitzani. The band dissolved on October 23, 1983, but has reunited at least three times since then.

== History ==
T-Slam began in 1980 with the collaboration of Danni Bassan (vocalist), Izhar Ashdot (guitarist) and Yair Nitzani (keyboardist). In 1981, with the addition of another guitarist, Yossi Sadeh, the band recorded its first song, "Tnu Li Rokenrol" ("Give Me Rock N' Roll"), in the Israeli Army Radio studios, and released their first album, Radio Hazak ("Loud Radio"), titled after their hit single, although initially they recorded the album in English. It sold over 40,000 copies in Israel.

They released their second album, T-Slam2 (תיסלם2), a year after, having enlarged their band with drummer Sami Avzardel and bassist Tzuf Philosof. Their last album, LeAsfanim Bilvad ("For Collectors Only"), was released in 1983; it included newer versions for some of their songs, covers for other bands, and a few songs made with the band Benzin.

On October 23, 1983, after a gig in Beer Sheba, the band announced that that was their last show, and that they did not intend to work on new songs.

=== Post-disbandment era ===
After the band dissolved, the six members started solo careers. Danny Bassan released three solo albums, Tsoof Philosof became a top session bass player and a member of the Local Band, Yoshi Sadeh spent a few years working in America, and Sammy Avzardel had his own working band. Yair Nitzani joined one of Israel's biggest record companies, Hed Arzi, and ended up managing it. Nitzani and Izhar Ashdot, who became a top record producer, were both responsible for Ofra Haza's 1988 European no. 1 single, "Im Nin'alu". Izhar started his successful solo career in 1992.

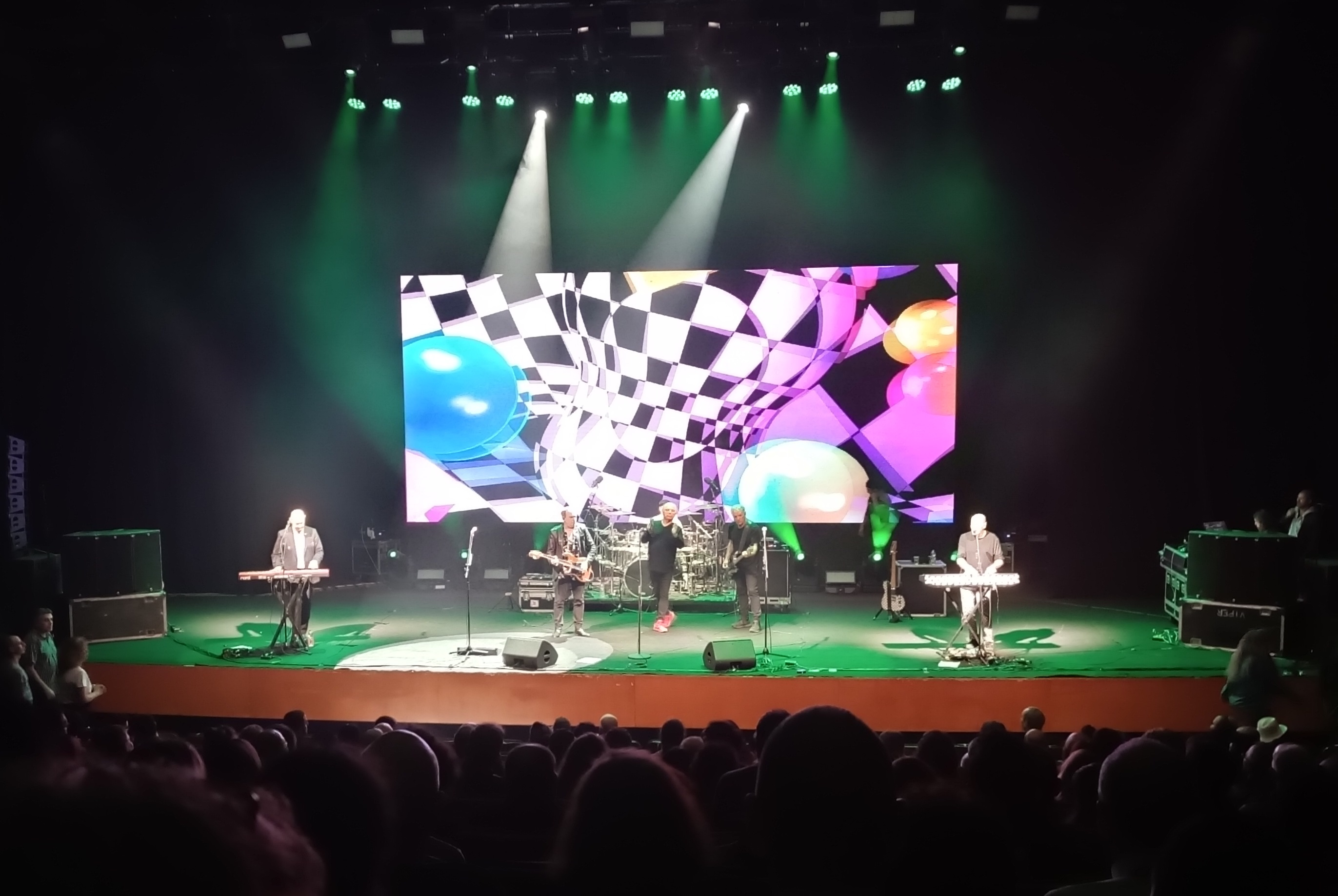
T-Slam band in concert, December 2022. From the right: Yossi Sade, Tsuf Filosof, Danny Bassan, Yizhar Ashdot, Yair Nitsani

In the summer of 1990, T-Slam produced a comeback tour, which filled stadiums all over Israel. The band recorded two new songs and released a compilation album, Nagnu Achshav ("Play Now"), which went platinum. The lead single of that album Parchupah Shel HaMedina ("The Face of the Nation") was a protest song about Shimon Peres and his recent attempt to form a government, it is also where the title of the album comes from.

In 1994, the band performed at the opening of the Hard Rock Cafe in Tel Aviv. A video news item reporting the show was added as one of the special bonuses on the live DVD released in 2003.

In March 2002, following rumors in the media, T-Slam played at the Barbi Club in Tel Aviv under the name Gold Fingers. The evening's success, together with the demand for further concerts and the great fun the guys had playing together, led T-Slam to start a tour that culminated in a show January 2003 at Tel Aviv Hangar with guest artists Muki, Monica Sex and Israeli rapper Subliminal. The live show was recorded and was released as a double CD and DVD named Or Shel Kokhavim ("Star Light").

On September 14, 2006, the band played a one-off reunion show with Rami Fortis and Berry Sakharof in Jerusalem.

On 28 February 2023 the band played together with the Israeli Philharmonic Orchestra to a packed crowd at the Charles Bronfman auditorium in Tel Aviv, the largest concert hall in Israel.

== Band members ==
- Danni Bassan - lead vocals, percussion
- Izhar Ashdot - guitars, vocals
- Yoshi Sadeh - guitars, vocals
- Yair Nitzani - keyboards, backing vocals
- Tzuf Philosof - bass guitar, backing vocals
- Sami Avzardel - drums, percussion.

== Discography ==
- 1981: Radio Hazak (Loud Radio, רדיו חזק)
- 1982: Tislam2 (T-Slam2, תיסלם2)
- 1983: LeAsfanim Bilvad (For Collectors Only, לאספנים בלבד)
- 1990: Nagnu Achshav (Play Now, נגנו עכשיו)
- 2003: Or Shel Kohavim (Light of the Stars, אור של כוכבים)
- 2015: T-Slam and the Israel Symphony Orchestra Rishon Lezion (תיסלם והסימפונית הישראלית ראשון לציון)
