= Boaz Sharabi =

Israeli actor-musician

Boaz Sharabi בעז שרעבי
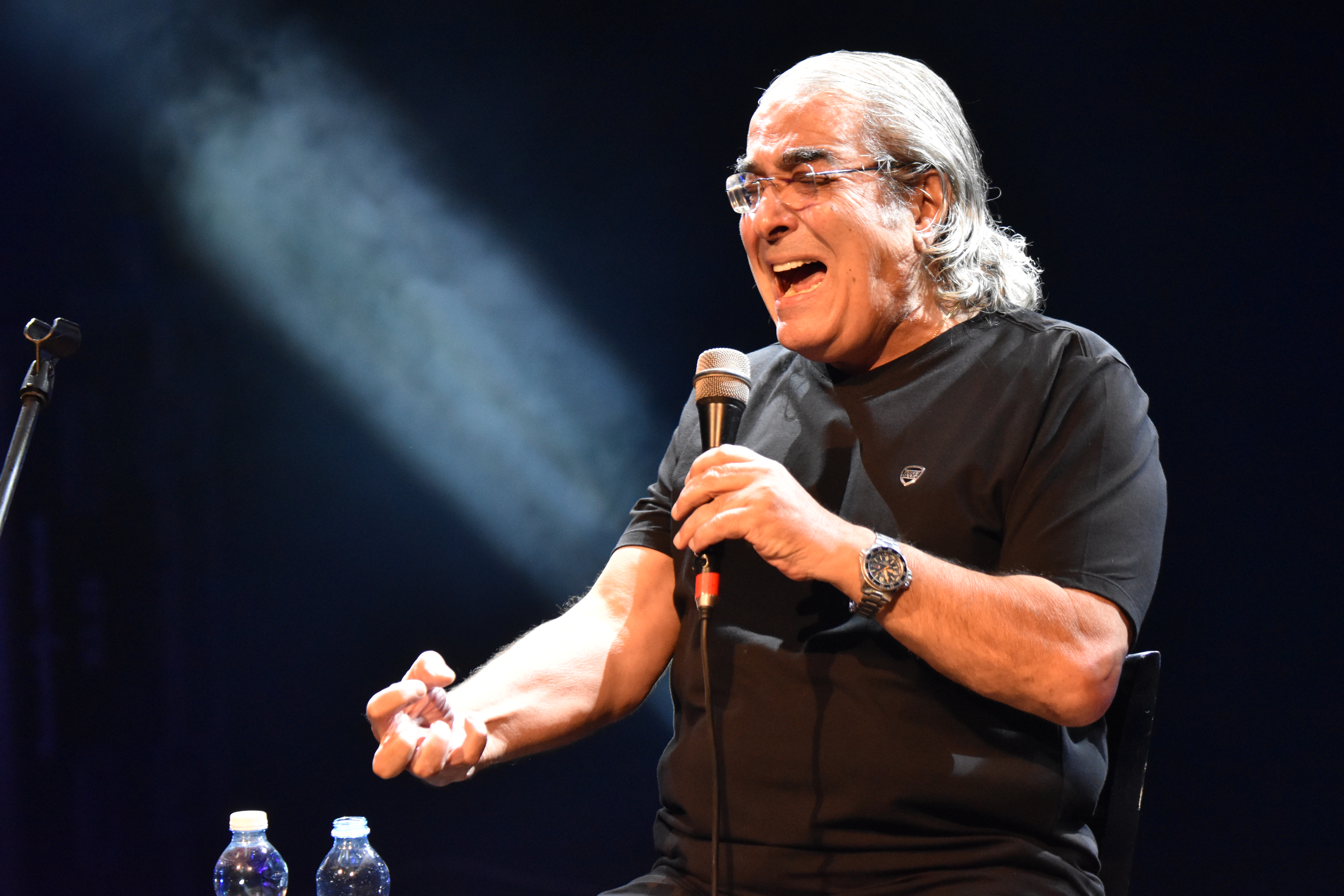
- Boaz Sharabi in 2018

Background information
- Born: 28 May 1947 (age 79); Tel Aviv, Mandatory Palestine.
- Origin: Tel Aviv, Israel.
- Genres: Israeli pop, Mizrahi.
- Years active: 1964-present
- Label: Hed Arzi Music

Boaz Sharabi (Hebrew: בעז שרעבי; born 28 May 1947) is an Israeli singer-songwriter, composer and lyricist, known for Israeli classics as "Latet", "Halevai", "At Li Laila", "Pamela", "Lashir Itach", "Kol Od", "Mi Yada Shekach Yihiyeh", "K'Shetavo" (written for Ron Arad), "Im at Adain Ohevet Oti" and "Etzli Hakol Beseder".

Many of his songs are acoustic rock, andalusian chords, soul music and oud type songs, blended with Israeli folk, Judeo-Yemenite and Pop overtones. He has included the recitation of poems by Shalom Shabazi in his albums.

== Biography ==
Boaz Sharabi was born in Tel Aviv during the Mandate era, one of ten children born to a Yemenite Jewish family of artists. He had a twin sister, Ada, who was recorded as having died at birth, but Sharabi believes she was kidnapped as part of the Yemenite Children Affair. His brother Yoel Sharabi is a Hasidic and Yemenite entertainer for Jewish communities abroad. Baruch Sharabi is a choreographer and Nehemia Sharabi is a songwriter.

Sharabi composed the music for and appeared onscreen in the movies Beyond the Walls and Beyond the Walls 2. He held a close working relationship with lyricist and poet Ehud Manor and composer Matti Caspi. In the 1980s, he sang a duet with Shoshana Damari.

Sharabi sold over two million records and had over 30 number one hits in the charts. His music was also popular in Lebanon and Turkey.

After a long hiatus, Sharabi released a new album, Linshom (To Breathe), in 2007. The song Im at Adayin Ohevet Oti (If you still love me) was named song of the year for 2007 by the Israeli Public, via Galgalatz and Yediot Achronot.

He has participated in many song contests. Among them, the Viña del Mar Festival Song in 1977, with "Song of Love", performed by female singer Navah Baruchin.

Sharabi lives in Caesarea, and has been married thrice. In the 1970s, he married Liora. After their divorce, he married Helen, a drug addict who committed suicide in 1991. In 2002, he married Pnina Tzadok, who was three decades his junior, and they had a son who was born in December 2004. They divorced in 2006.
