= Moshe Datz =

Israeli singer, composer and producer (born 1961)

Moshe Datz משה דץ
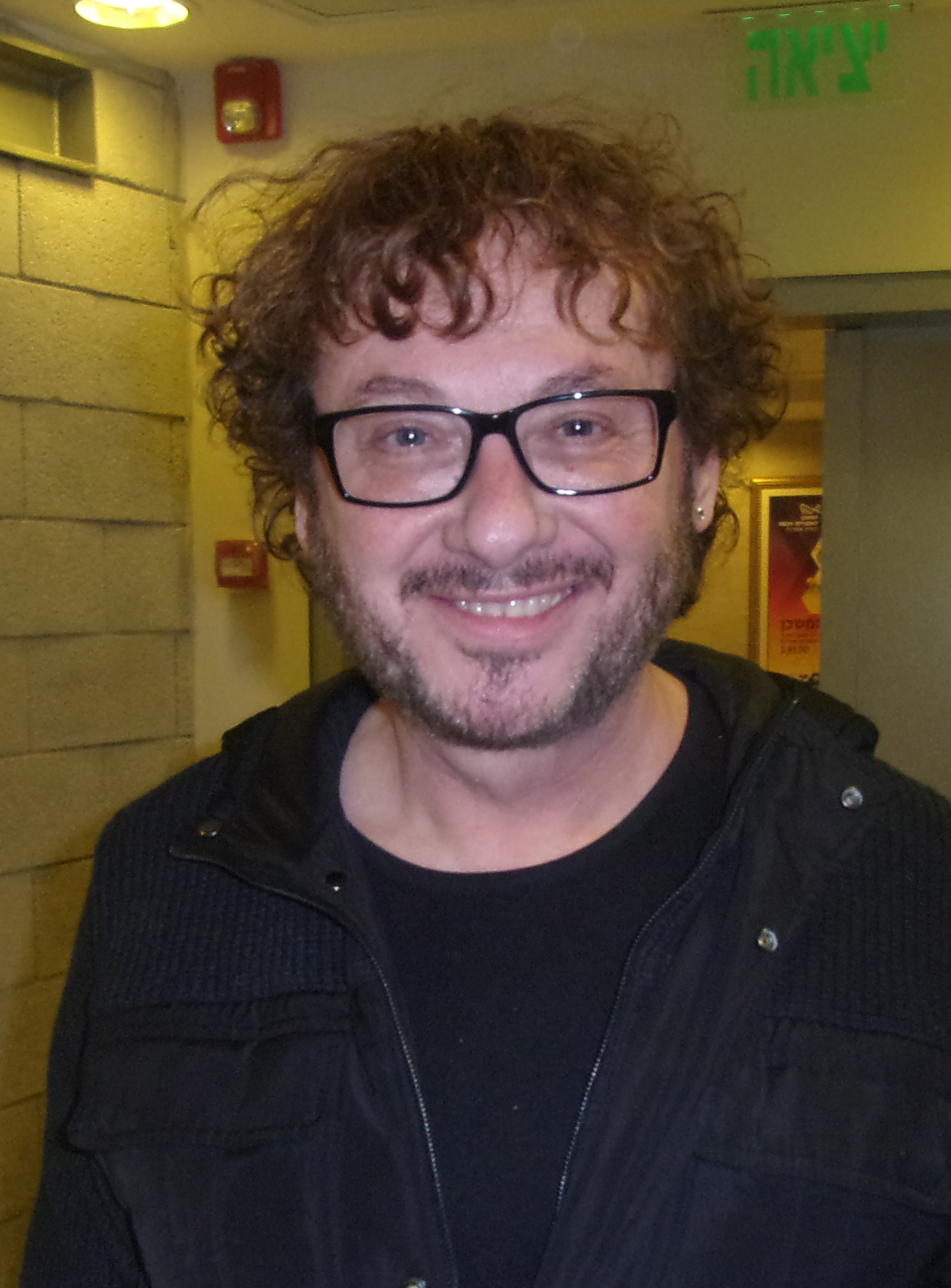
- Datz in 2018

Background information
- Born: 6 March 1961 (age 64); Haifa, Israel
- Genres: Pop, children's music
- Occupation(s): Singer, composer, producer, actor
- Instrument(s): Guitar, piano, vocals
- Years active: 1972–present
- Spouse: Orna Datz (m. 1985–2006)

Moshe Datz (Hebrew: משה דץ; born 6 March 1961) is an Israeli singer, composer and producer.

== Biography ==
At age 8, Moshe Datz began singing for Effi Netzer's urban choir. At age 10, he was accepted into the Israeli Children Song Festival, where he performed the song "Rolly Roll" (Hebrew: רולי רול) by Ofra Fuchs. The next year Datz again participated in the festival, performing Tzipi Shavit's entry "Doda Samantha" (Hebrew: דודה סמנתה; meaning "Aunt Samantha"). At 11, while volunteering for the Israeli youth organisation "Noar Le'noar" (Hebrew: נוער לנוער; meaning "Adolescents for adolescents"), which was the Israeli branch of the BBYO, Datz wrote the song "Ha'olam Zakuk Le'ahava" (Hebrew: העולם זקוק לאהבה; meaning "The world needs love") which became the movement's anthem. During his military service he served in the IDF choir. In 1982, following his military service, Datz participated in the Hasidic Song Festival.

Datz first rose to prominence in 1984 as the soloist for Rachel Shapira's "Anshei Hageshem" (Hebrew: אנשי הגשם; meaning "The rain people"); The song peaked at number 2 on the IBA's weekly hit parade, and was ranked 16th in the yearly parade. In 1985, Datz joined the Hasidic Song Festival's travelling troupe where he met Orna Cohen, whom he married 3 months later. The two became known as Duo Datz, and they worked together for the next 20 years. They participated in the 1987 Israeli preselection for Eurovision, achieving fourth place with the song "Cupidon" (Hebrew: קופידון; meaning "Cupid"). In the summer of 1988 they released their first album "Be'ota Mita" (Hebrew: באותה מיטה; meaning "In the same bed") to lukewarm reviews. The pair returned to the Israeli preselection in 1991, where they placed first with the song "Kan" (Hebrew: כאן; meaning "Here"); written and composed by Uzi Hitman. The duo subsequently competed at the Eurovision Song Contest 1991, achieving a third place finish. In addition to his own participation, Datz also composed the 1995 Israeli Eurovision entry "Amen" performed by Liora Simon, and likewise was involved in composing "Yom Huledet (Happy Birthday)", the Israeli Eurovision entry in 1999 performed by Eden.

In 1995, Duo Datz released the children's music tape "Ba Li Mesiba Li" (Hebrew: בא לי מסיבה לי; meaning "I want a party for me"). Released on VHS, the tape was a collection of party and birthday songs made in collaboration; The songs were written by Smadar Shir, composed by Moshe Datz, and sung by the duo. The tape was a big commercial success, most notable for the song "Ey'fo Ha'uga?" (Hebrew: איפה העוגה?; meaning "Where is the cake?") which became a ubiquitous children's song, often personally associated with Datz.

In 2007, he starred in an advertising campaign for the Israeli beer Goldstar. From 2008 to 2010, Datz hosted a morning show called "Lihyot Tov" (Hebrew: לחיות טוב; meaning "Good Living") on Channel 2.
