= Duo Datz =

Israeli musical duo

- Origin: Israel
- Years active: 1986–2006
- Members: Orna Datz; Moshe Datz

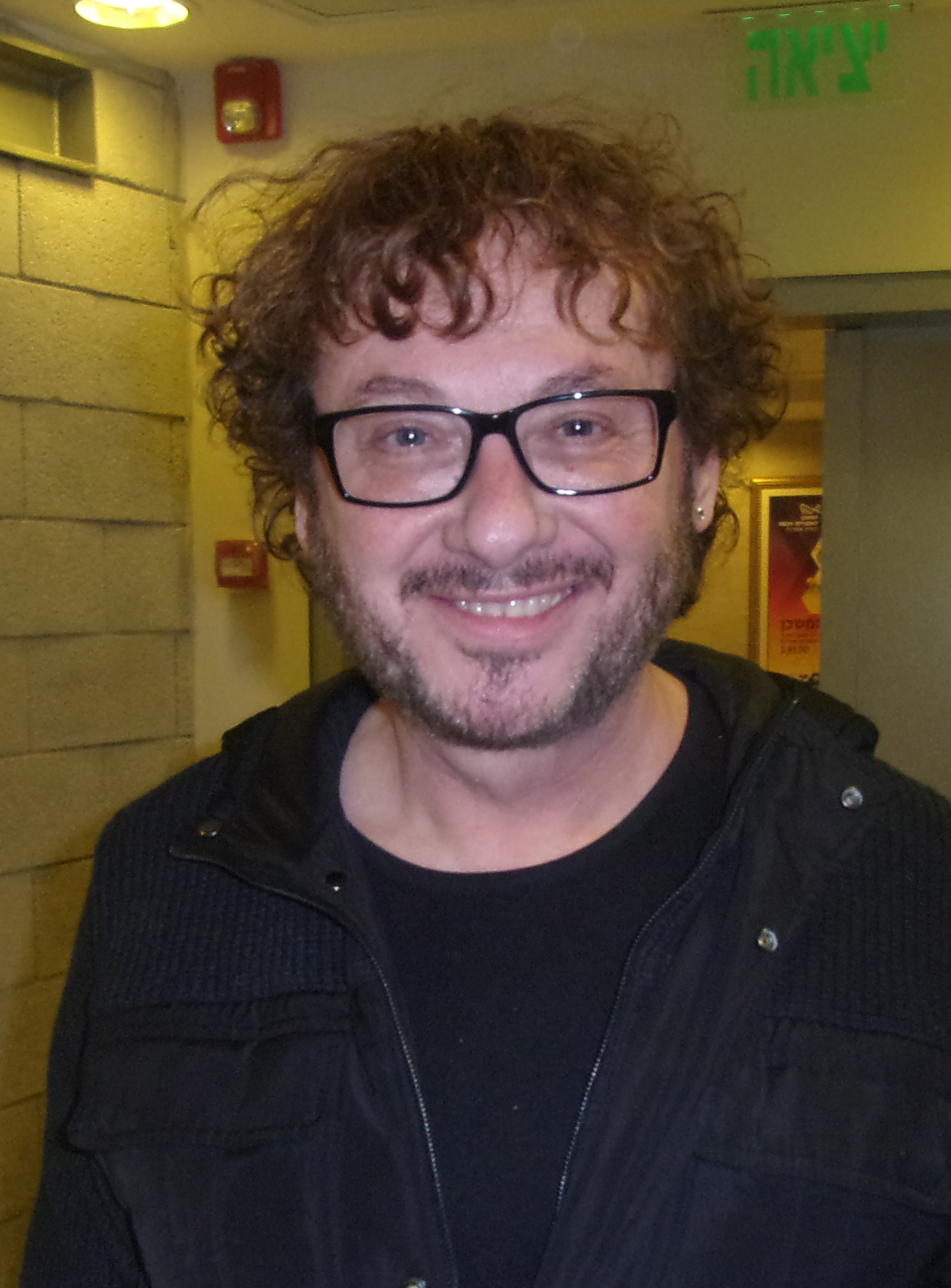
Moshe Datz in 2013

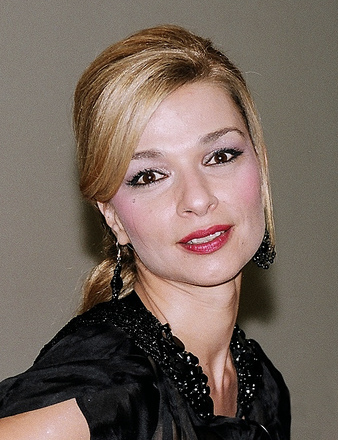
Orna Datz in 2007

Duo Datz (Hebrew: אורנה ומשה דץ, Orna U-Moshe Datz; commonly referred in Hebrew as דץ ודצה Datz Ve-Datza) is a group comprising Orna and Moshe Datz (colloquially known as Datz and Datza or as the Datzes). A musical duo in Israel for audiences of all ages, they were also introduced to European audiences by scoring a third place for Israel at the Eurovision Song Contest 1991.

The Datzes duo were together from 1985 to 2006. During that period, Duo Datz released ten albums, some of which reached gold album status, and six videotapes for preschoolers. The best known five of the six are in the Tif vaTaf series. The other recording is "I want a party for me with Datz and Datza" (1995). It was based on birthday songs by Smadar Shir, from her book "I want a party for me".

== History ==
=== 1980s: Marriage, In the Same Bed, The Ways of Love ===
Orna Cohen and Moshe Datz met during a joint concert tour around the world as part of the traveling band of the Hasidic Singer Festival, which performed in front of Jewish communities around the world. The two got married and began to act and perform together with great success. Their popularity increased after the 1987 Eurovision Kdam national selection, where they sang the song "Cupidon" which placed fourth.

In the summer of 1987, they published their first album "In the same bed", which included the songs of Moshe Mitzvot "Hoofim" [2]. Its theme song was written by Hani Livna (also from "Beaches") and composed by Miron Minster . Other prominent songs on the album were "Shir Kavein" and "Shir Lemenach". Despite the success of the songs, the album was not a commercial success and was not praised by the critics. The album's songs were arranged by Ron Droyan.

The duo released their second album "The Ways of Love" in 1989. Chava Alberstein was the artistic consultant and musical producer on this album, with Rami Levin doing the arrangement. The album was awarded gold certification. The hits of the album were "Mi", which was written and composed by Elberstein, "In the ways of love", "Each time again", "Lan" and "Why did you come". It was later released on CD. Other composers on the album, in addition to Alberstein, were Uzi Hitman, Rachel Shapira, Miron Minster and Yoram Zadok. In the same year, the children's and youth series "Tzatzkani", whose theme song was performed by the two, was broadcast on television.

=== 1990–1994: The Glass Bell, Aris, Kan at the Eurovision ===
In their second Kdam attempt, in 1991, the duo won with the song "Kan" and were sent to represent Israel at Eurovision 1991 in Rome, where their song placed third overall, only seven points away from first place. The song was originally offered to Yardena Arazi for her Eurovision participation in 1988. Arazi had turned it down.

In January 1992, a small plane they were flying in with the Swedish singer Carola made a crash landing at the Bar Yehuda Airfield near the Dead Sea.

=== 1995–1999: The Sixth, The First Man, albums for children ===
In 1997, they participated in an advertising campaign for the Israeli Israel Dairy Board, and a year later in an advertising campaign for the diaper brand "Tapanoks"

In January 1999, the duo released their sixth album "Orena and Moshe Datz", also known as "The First Man". In this successful album, the songs "I sing to you", "Eat her" with Lior Farhi, a new version of "Hida at Li", a new version of "Derech yusha" with the Eden band and the duet with Daklon for his song "Vanmati Shir" ("Ayelet Chen") stood out. The album's songs were arranged by Dodi Rosenthal and Gadi Goldman.

For Hanukkah 1999, the duo played in the musical "Cinderella and the prince". In the same year, they also led the advertising campaign of the insurance company "The Most Direct".

=== 21st century: Collections, Tif vaTaf, separation, unifications ===
On 22 December 2006 the couple announced they were ending their 21-year marriage. Since, the couple has collaborated on several occasions.

Awards and achievements
Preceded by Rita with Shara Barkhovot	Israel in the Eurovision Song Contest; 1991	Succeeded by Dafna Dekel with Ze Rak Sport
