= Smadar =

Smadar is a given name. Notable people with the name include:

- Smadar Lavie, American-Israeli anthropologist, author, and activist
- Smadar Levi, Israeli singer
- Smadar Naoz (born 1978), Israeli-American astrophysicist
- Smadar Rosensweig, American theologian
- Smadar Sheffi, Israeli art critic and curator
- Smadar Shir (born 1957), Israeli writer

== See also ==
- Smadar, a settlement near Yavne'el, Israel
