= How do I bless thee? =

"מה אברך"
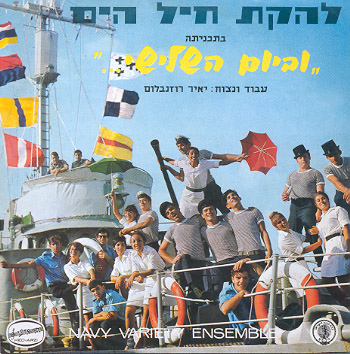
- "On the Third Day", the program and album that the song is from.

Single by Israeli Navy Band

from the album And on the third day
- Language: Hebrew
- English title: With what should I bless thee?/How should I bless thee?
- Released: 1968
- Genre: Israeli pop
- Length: 4 minutes
- Composer: Yair Rosenblum
- Lyricist: Rachel Shapira

"How do I bless thee?" (Also called "With what should I bless thee?") (Ma Avarech) is a Hebrew song written by Rachel Shapira and composed by Yair Rosenblum. The song is one of the best-known memorial songs in Israeli culture.

This song is a eulogy, sung from the perspective of an Angel, who is tasked with blessing a man throughout his entire life. However, the song ends tragically with the line:

This boy is now an angel
He will never be blessed again.
Oh Lord, Oh Lord Oh, Lord
if you only blessed him with life

== Background ==
Shapira, a member of Kibbutz Shefayim, wrote the song after the Six Day War in memory of her classmate on the kibbutz, Eldad (Dedi) Krok, who fell in that war in a battle in the Shu'afat neighborhood of Jerusalem, at the age of 22. The song was published in a memorial booklet for Krok produced on the kibbutz, entitled "To Eldad". According to Shapira, the poem has biographical elements from the character of Krok, as she knew him. Rosenblum came across the poem by chance, in passing on various reading materials that rolled into his door during his stay at the kibbutz guesthouse, after a car accident he had. This is the first known poem Shapira wrote.

== Performances ==
The song is performed by the Navy Band at the end of Micha Shagrir's documentary - The War After the War.

The original performance of the song was sung by the Navy Band with vocalist Rivka Zohar, included in the band's program On the Third Day in 1968 and became a hit. Zohar recalled that when she first performed the song to crowds of soldiers, the reaction was quite emotional. According to the Society of Authors, Composers and Music Publishers in Israel, in the ten years prior to 2014, the song was the most played song on the radio on Israeli War Memorial Day. Since then, the song has received many additional performances.

== See also ==
- Music of Israel
- We Are Both from the Same Village, a contemporary memorial song with similar popularity.
