= Rachel Shapira =

Israeli songwriter and poet (born 1945)

Rachel Shapira רחל שפירא
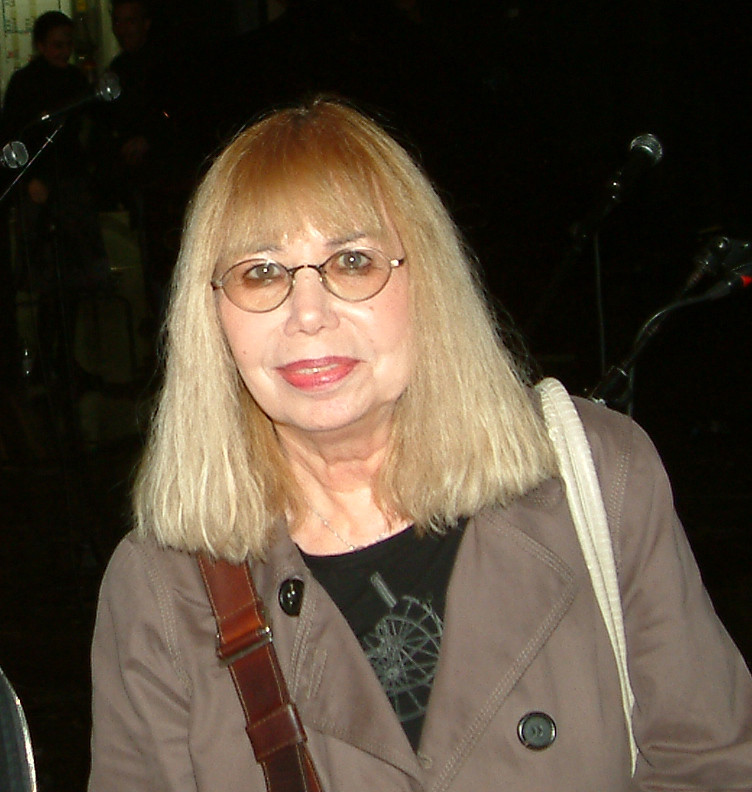
- Shapira in 2008

Background information
- Born: 1945 (age 80–81); Kibbutz Shefayim
- Occupations: Songwriter, poet
- Years active: 1967–present

Rachel Shapira (Hebrew: רחל שפירא; born July 25, 1945) is an Israeli songwriter and poet. She rose to prominence after the Six-Day War with her anti-war song "Mah Avarekh" ("With What Shall I Bless?"), set to music by Yair Rosenblum, and went on to write some of the "greatest classics" of Hebrew song. Her songs have been set to music by leading Israeli composers and performed by top Israeli artists.

== Early life ==
Shapira was born in 1945 on Kibbutz Shefayim in central Israel. She began writing songs at age 12, putting her own lyrics on Hebrew and secular melodies. At the time, she did not have any aspirations to be a songwriter or poet, but she did send her songs to popular children's magazines to be published under a pseudonym. On her kibbutz, she worked as a special education teacher, specializing in reading problems and dyslexia.

== Songwriting career ==
Shapira rose to national prominence with her 1967 anti-war song "Mah Avarekh" ("With What Shall I Bless?"), written in the aftermath of the Six-Day War. Shapira had written the song in memory of Eldad Kravek, a fellow member of her kibbutz who had fallen in that war at the age of 21. Originally titled "Eldad", the song was published by Shapira in a memorial booklet produced by her kibbutz. Yair Rosenblum, musical director of the Israeli Navy Band, saw the booklet at the kibbutz guest house where he had come to recuperate after an automobile accident. Unbeknownst to Shapira, he set the song to music, retitled it "Mah Avarekh", and returned to the kibbutz with soloist Rivka Zohar to perform it for Shapira. The song was recorded on the Navy Ensemble's 1968 album The Third Day and performed around the country. While Israel had been victorious in the Six-Day War, the song encapsulated the nation's grief over its casualties and became a hit. Following this success, Shapira's other songs came to national attention.

In 1971 Shapira released her first joint song with Israeli composer Moni Amarillo, "Tzipur Bageshem" ("Bird in the Rain"). Her song "U'matok Ha'or B'einayim" ("The Sweetest Light in the Eyes") was performed at the 1971 Israel Song Festival by Sassi Keshet, followed by "Hashir al Eretz Sinai" ("The Song About the Land of Sinai") performed by Shlomo Artzi at the 1972 Israel Song Festival, "Olam Katan" ("A Small World") performed by Chava Alberstein at the 1983 Children's Song Festival, and Karov Layam ("Near the Sea") performed by Yardena Arazi at the 1988 Pre-Eurovision. In 1978, Alberstein produced a complete album of Shapira's compositions under the title Hitbaharut (Brightening).

Shapira's songs have been set to music by leading Israeli composers and performed by top Israeli artists. Performers include Israeli singers Ilanit, Ruhama Raz, Gali Atari, Yardena Arazi, Anat Atzmon, Riki Gal, Margalit Tzan'ani, and Dani Litani, and Hakol Over Habibi, Orna and Moshe Datz, and Hofim.

== Musical style ==
Shapira views her songs as "personal ballads" that have a strong connection to the Land of Israel. In an interview she explained:

I think I like personal ballads, songs of crisis that describe confrontation with a group, especially – but not only – by a female character. There is a constant movement between alienation and belonging; sometimes it's very obvious and sometimes it's hidden, but someone who invests time will see it. I have some kind of need for self-definition and the expression of anxieties and fears. I don't write for what people call "to forget your problems". I dissect myself, and in this sense, it's not pure entertainment, but something else. Instead of escaping from daily hardships, my way is the opposite: I want to create from within the hardship this beauty in art and music, in songs that rhyme and in the human voice.

She has also produced translated versions of Don McLean's "Genesis", sung by Gali Atari, Julie Gold's "From a Distance" (retitled "From Above"), performed by Ruhama Raz, and Sting's "Fields of Gold", sung by Dorit Farkash.

== Awards and honors ==
Shapira received the ACUM Prize for lifetime achievement in Hebrew song in 1999, and a similar prize from Bar-Ilan University in the 2010s.

== Sources ==
- Edelman, Marsha Bryan (2007). Discovering Jewish Music. Jewish Publication Society. ISBN 9780827610279.
- Gavriely-Nuri, Dalia (2014). Israeli Culture on the Road to the Yom Kippur War. Lexington Books. ISBN 9780739185957.
