= Israeli Navy Band =

Israeli military band (1948–1975)

Israeli Navy Band להקת חיל הים
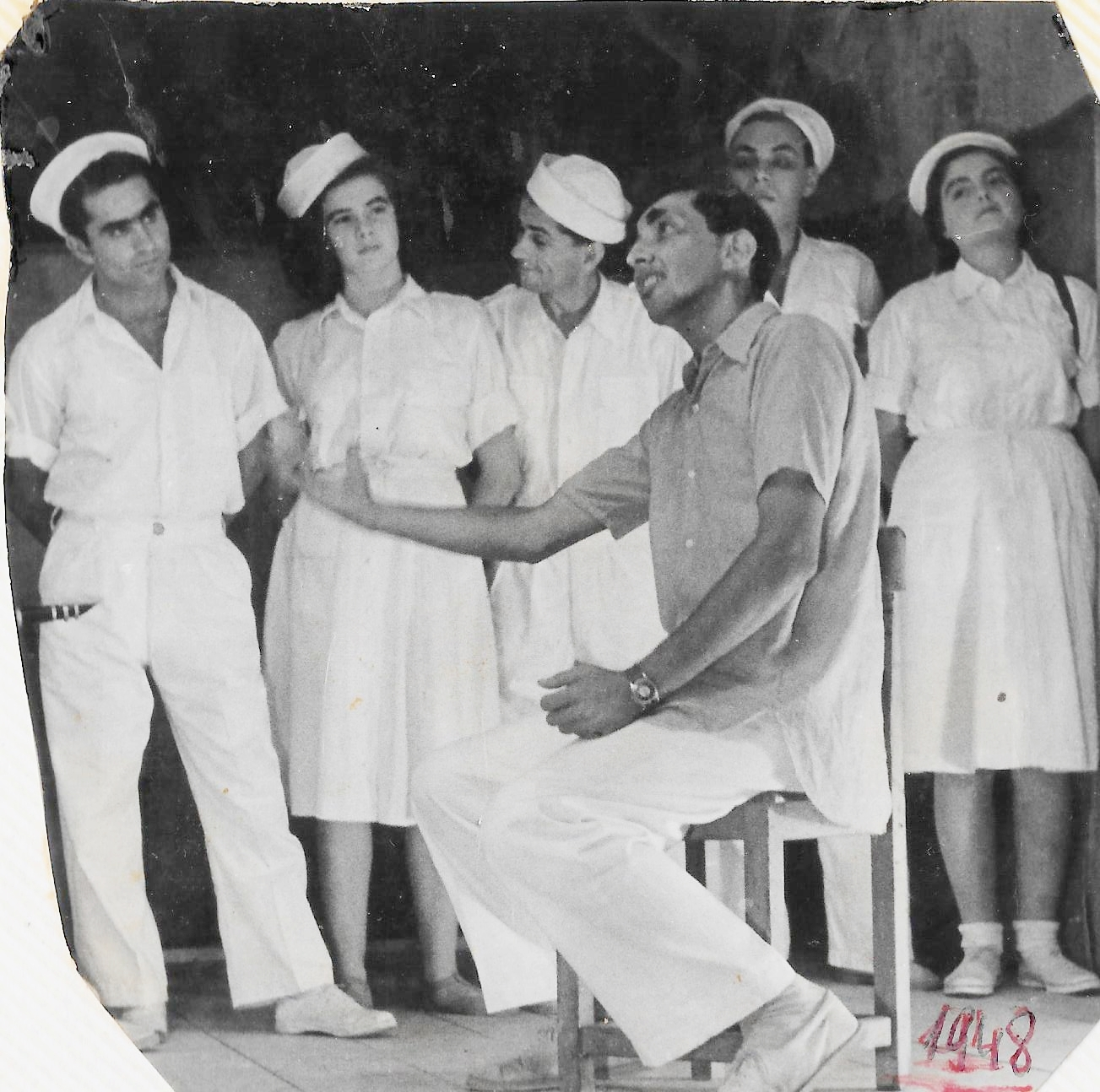
- The Israeli Navy Band in 1948.

Background information
- Origin: Tel Aviv, Israel.
- Genres: Israeli folk, Israeli rock
- Years active: 1948, 1961-1978, 1985-present.
- Label: Hed Arzi Music

The Israeli Navy Band (Hebrew: להקת חיל הים, romanized: Lehakat Heyl Hayam) is a musical military ensemble of the Israeli Navy, part of the Israel Defense Forces (IDF).

The band was particularly successful between the Six-Day War in 1967 and the Yom Kippur War in 1973, during which period several of its songs achieved commercial success and became Israeli standards.

== History ==
=== Early years ===
The Israeli Navy Band first appeared in October 1948 and consisted of 13 active-duty soldiers. Due to a lack of direct oversight by commanding officers, expenses accumulated, and the band was subsequently disbanded. In the early 1960s, an officer from the Education and Youth Corps requested that a group of reservists form the Lehakat Ḥeil Hayam (Naval Corps Entertainment Group). Early members included Dan Almagor, Rivka Zohar, and Meir Noy. Following its formation, the group began rehearsals for the program Ve BaYom HaShlishi ("And on the Third Day").

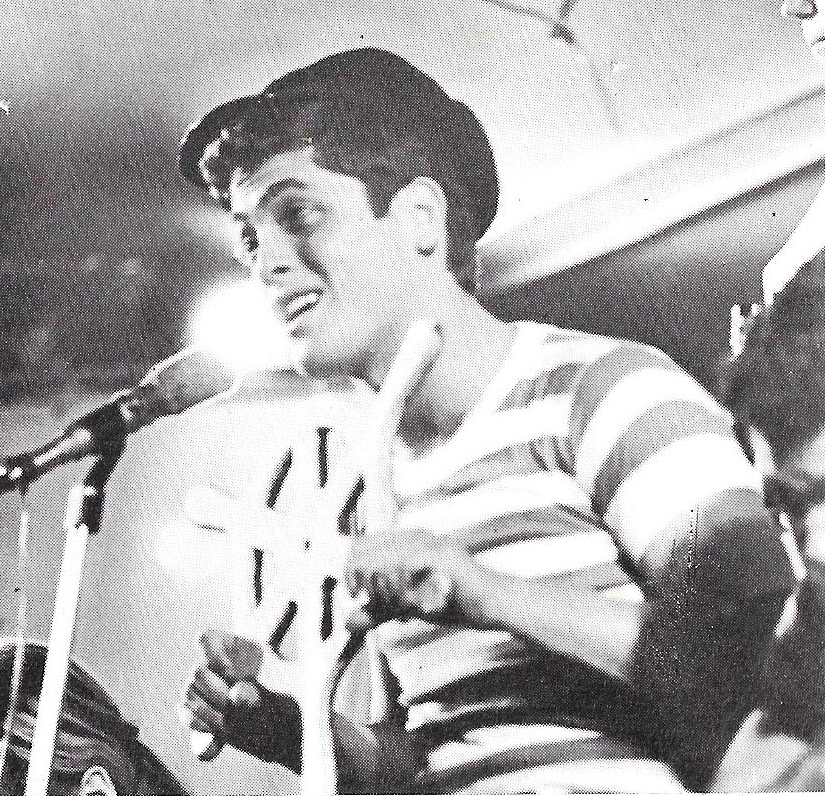
Shlomo Artzi performing the song "When I Grow Up".

=== Popularity and decline ===
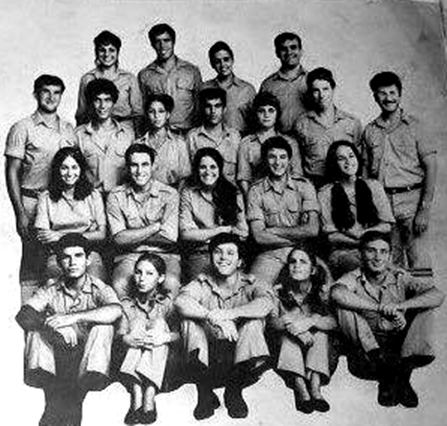
The Israeli Navy Band in 1971.

In 1967, after the Six-Day War, the ensemble performed the song Mah Avarekh, written by Rachel Shapira. The group performed primarily at internal naval events, particularly during Sea Corps celebrations. In the mid-1960s, active-duty soldiers were incorporated on a part-time basis. When the decision was made in the Navy to form a representative band, the Six-Day War broke out and only afterwards were the resources allocated to form the band.

Lehakat Ḥeil Hayam was active and widely recognized between the Six-Day War in 1967 and the Yom Kippur War in 1973. The band was named Band of the Year award in 1970 and 1972 as part of the Israeli Annual Hebrew Song Chart. Songs associated with the ensemble during this period include Chasake, May the Sea be Silent, and On the Road.

Following the Yom Kippur War, the troupe lost popularity, and it was disbanded toward the end of 1975. Notable members during this period included Haya Arad, Oded Ben-Hur, Yael Levy, Albert Piamente, and Uzi Asner.

=== 1980s and present ===
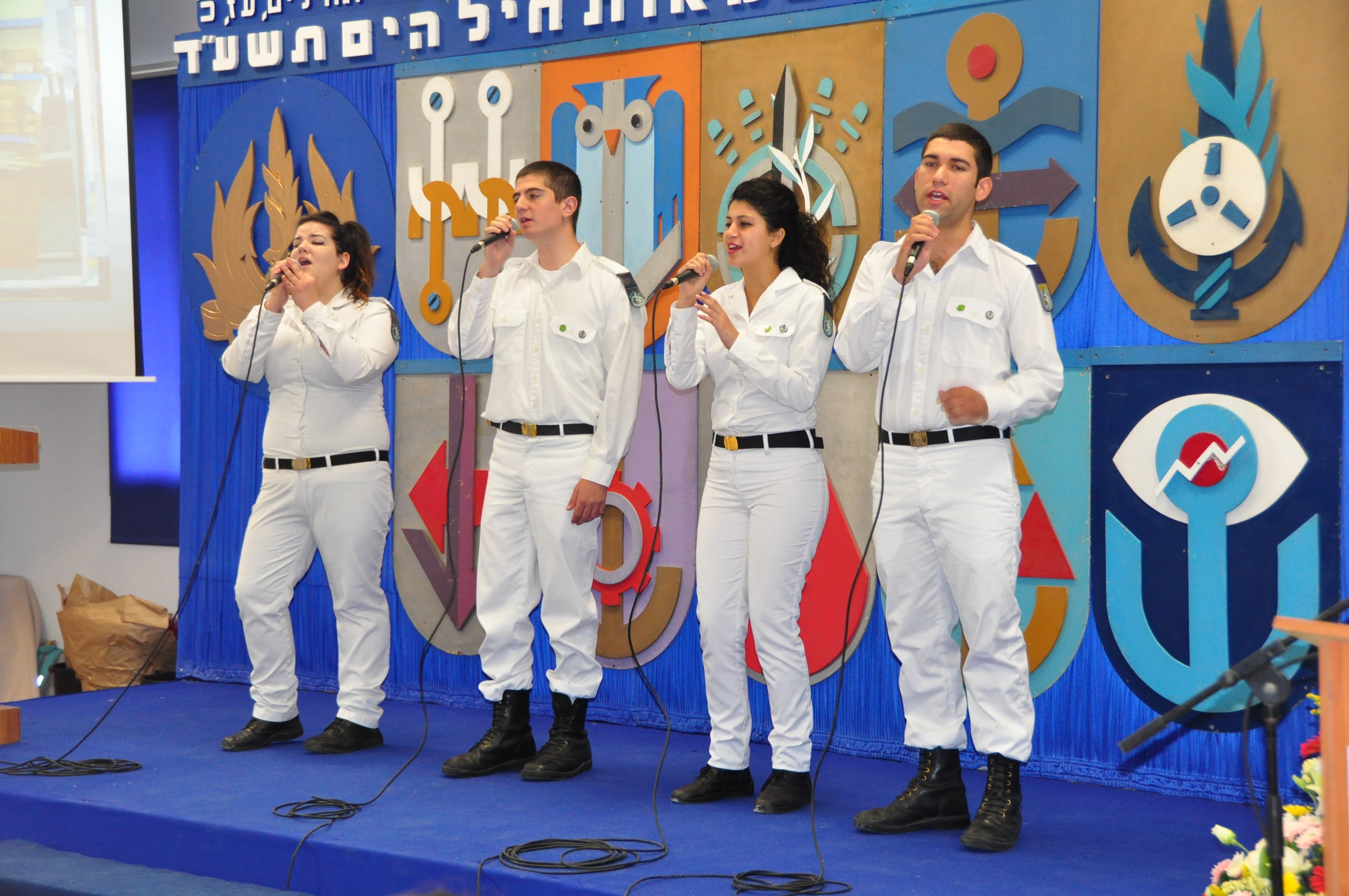
Members of the ensemble in 2014, with singer Netta Barzilai on the far-left.

Despite the re-establishment of military ensemble in many commands and corps of the Israel Defense Forces during the 1980s, the Navy did not re-establish a band. The Variety Ensemble of the Israeli Navy currently serves as the Navy’s primary musical unit. Netta Barzilai was a member of this ensemble.

== Notable members ==
Among the prominent alumni of the band:

- Rivka Zohar
- Shlomo Artzi
- Netta Barzilai
- Riki Gal
- Dov Glickman
