= Orna Datz =

- אורנה דץ
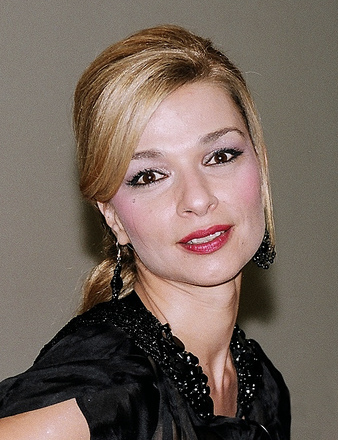
- Born: May 10, 1964 (age 62); Holon
- Children: 2

Orna Datz (Hebrew: אורנה דץ; born Orna Cohen born 10 May 1964) is an Israeli singer, actress and television presenter.

== Biography ==
Orna Cohen was born in Holon, Israel. At age 17, she was elected "Miss Holon". In 1987 she married the singer Moshe Datz and they became known as the Duo Datz. In 2001 she began to host the fashion tv series Makeover (מהפך), and in 2006 she began hosting the Israeli version of The Swan. In 2005 and 2006 she presented the Miss Israel Beauty pageant.

Media offices
| Preceded by Aki Avni | Miss Israel host 2003 | Succeeded by Yael Bar Zohar |
| Preceded by Yael Bar Zohar | Miss Israel host 2005–2006 | Succeeded by Galit Gutmann |
