= Rivka Zohar =

Israeli singer

- רבקה זהר
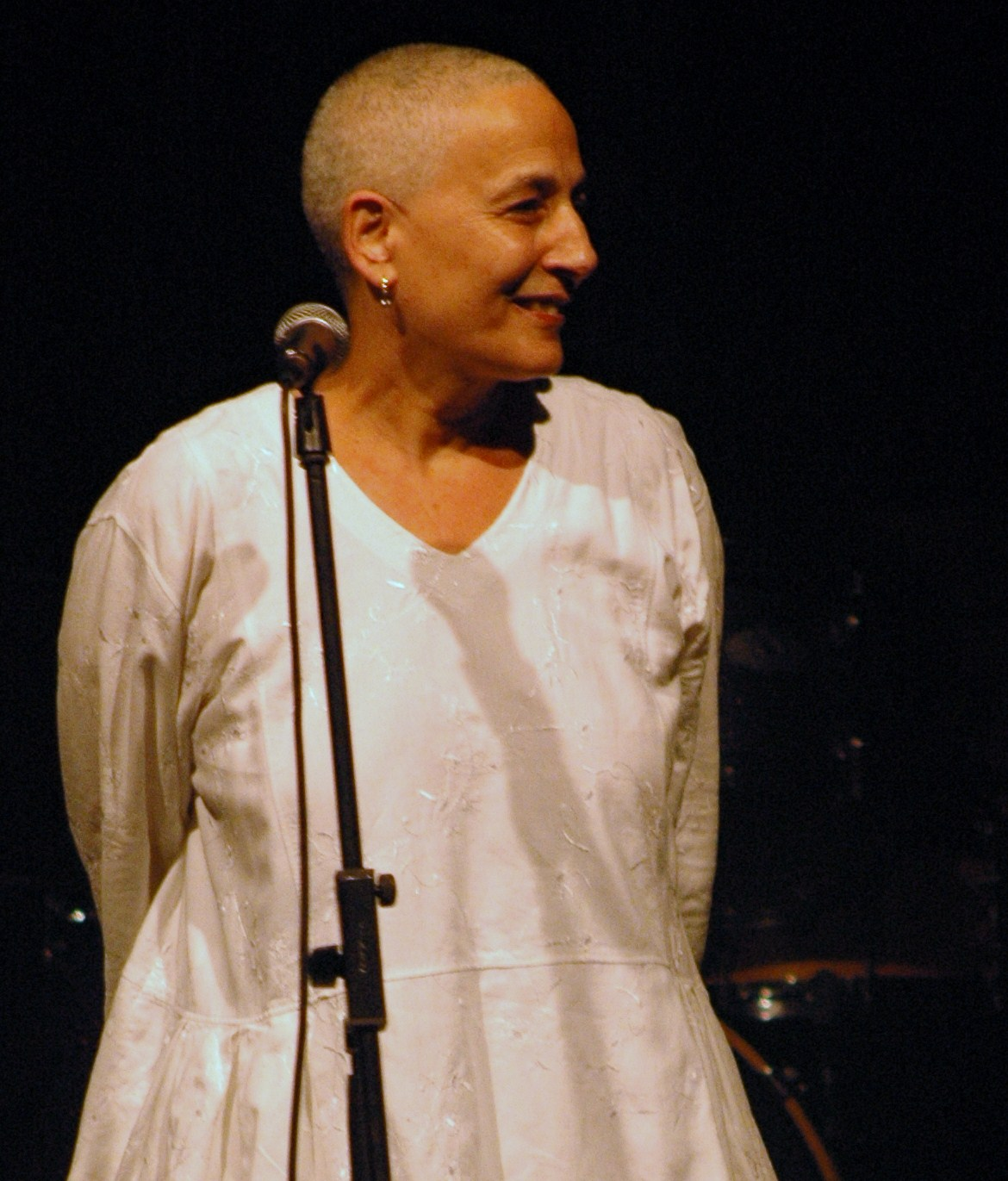
- Rivka Zohar, 2010
- Born: Rivka Zinati רבקה זינתי; 1948 (age 77–78); Akko, Israel
- Occupation: Singer
- Spouse: Shlomo Kalo

Rivka Zohar (Hebrew: רבקה זהר, Hebrew pronunciation: [ʁivˈkä ˈzohäʁ]; June 30, 1948) is an Israeli singer.

== Biography ==
Rivka Zinati (later Zohar) was born and raised in Akko, Israel. Her father, Aaron Zinati, was a fire chief. Zohar studied in Akko, and in the agricultural school in Nahalal. Rivka's family is of Moroccan origins, having arrived in Haifa in the beginning of the 19th century.

=== 1960s ===
As a child, she appeared on Tshuot Rishonot ("First Applause"), a radio program aimed at the discovery of young talent.

In 1967, Rivka auditioned to participate in Lehakat HaNahal, a popular Israeli army band, but was not chosen. Shortly thereafter, she successfully auditioned for the composer and producer Ilan Mokhiah.

In the beginning of her military service, she performed in front of the Israeli Navy, with the accompaniment of an accordionist. Those performances were well received by the soldiers, leading to the creation of Lehakat Heyl Hayam (The Navy Band), which immediately began rehearsing for the program Ve BaYom HaShlishi ("And On The Third Day"). During the band's rehearsals, Yair Rosenblum presented Rivka with the song "Mah Avarekh" ("With What Shall I Bless?"), composed to the lyrics of Rachel Shapira. Rivka was the soloist for the song, which became the show's greatest hit when it aired in 1968.

In 1967, the Navy Band performed the song "Mah Avarekh" written by Rachel Shapira in memory of a young man from her Kibbutz fallen in the Six-Day-War. Yoram Taharlev (songwriter) meets a carpenter carving a chair for Elijah the Prophet and inspired by him writes the lyrics of the song "Al Kapav Yavee" (1969). Rivka Zohar sang the song in the song festival; it was voted the "song of the year" and won the "David's Harp" award.

Natan Alterman, moved by her voice, added her to the musical "Tsats and Tsatsa" (1969). He wrote especially for her "Oriana" and "Zemer Shalosh Hatshuvot". She was also noted for performance of "Gedalya" and "BeKerem HaTemanim".

=== 1970s and 1980s ===
In 1972, she traveled to New York with her first husband and her little daughter Tamah. She worked at the "Finjan Club" in the Village where she met Ali, a player of oud and darbuka. They played together for seven years. The song "Haderech El Hakfar" brought the singer back to her homeland.

In 1988, Zohar met the philosopher and writer Shlomo Kalo, who wrote songs for her, among them "Avi Hatov Shebashamaim", "Sipur Al Tsipor", "Lichyot Otam Ad Tom."

=== 1990s and 2000s ===
In February 2007, "The Olive Tree" was published and in its strands the song "Ohevet Othcha" – "loving you" was recorded. In September 2007, for the first time in about 20 years, Zohar appeared on the stage of the Rishon LeZion Concert Hall, accompanied by the Symphonic Orchestra of Rishon LeZion with the arranger and conductor Ilan Mochiach. Her show "Chelkat Elohim" combined old and new songs.

=== 2010s ===
In 2012, on a gesture to composer Arye Levanon, came behind the stage a young singer named Liron Lev and asks Zohar to listen to one of his songs that might suit her. From that moment they both attached and performed together in all of Israel with a show called "Lo kemo Etmol - Not As Yesterday". In the show, they sing new songs in which Rivka, for the first time in her life, writes lyrics and Liron Lev the music. Their first DJ is Tikun Klali.

In 2014, her husband Shlomo Kalo died with his wife at his side. Zohar said that there is no one like him to show you your path.

=== 2018 ===
In 2018, Zohar appeared in a new show called "What a Happiness", after 3 years with Liron Lev she returned to be alone on stage, and from this show she released 2 new songs – "Sings to you", a love song which she wrote with Liron about her only child, and a cover of Kristin Hersh's song, "Your Ghost".

== Discography ==
- "Rivka Zohar", 1970 (released as a CD in 1996)
- "Rivka Zohar - Savta Rivka", 1971
- "Ivriya", 1987
- "Hesed Mufla", 1998
- Kalat Melekh, single, 2004
- M'Breshit, collection, 2005
- Ohevet Otkha, single, 2007
- Not As Yesterday - With Singer/composer Liron Lev, Album, 2013
- Light Around You - With Singer /composer Liron Levm, Album 2018
- Your Ghost, Single 2019
- Sing To You, Single 2019

== See also ==
- Music of Israel
