= Uri Ben-Ari =

Israeli general and writer

- אורי בן-ארי
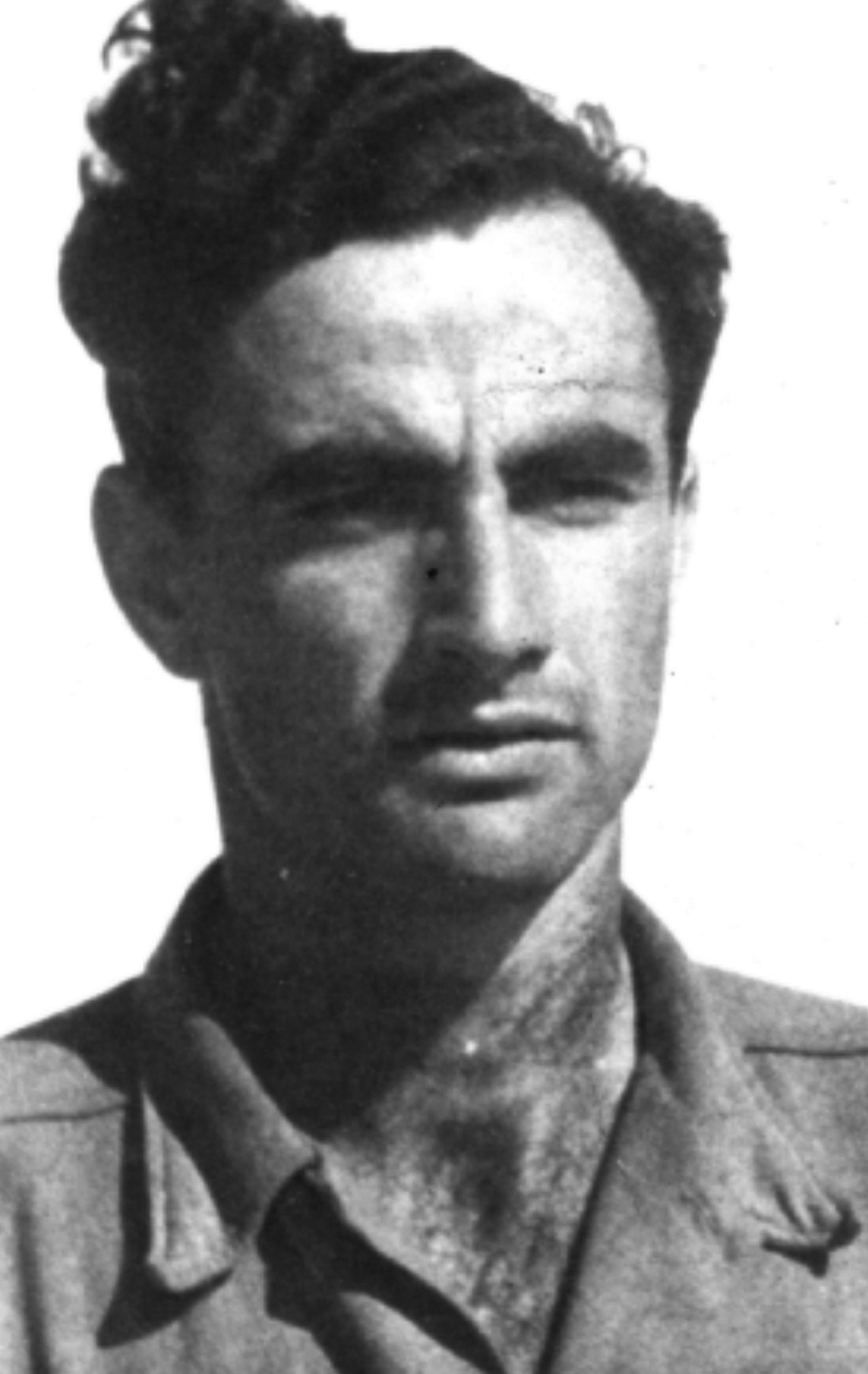
- Uri Ben-Ari (1948)
- Born: Heinz Benner; 1925; Schöneberg, Berlin, Germany
- Died: 2009 (aged 83–84)
- Military career
- Branch: Israel Defense Forces
- Service years: 1946–1978
- Rank: Tat aluf (Brigadier General)
- Commands: Armored Corps, Deputy Commander of the Southern Command
- Awards: Yitzhak Sadeh Prize (1995)
- Other work: Diplomat, writer

Uri Ben-Ari (Hebrew: אורי בן-ארי; 1925–2009) was tat aluf (brigadier general) of the Israeli Defence Forces (IDF), diplomat and writer. He was recognized as a driving force under the transformation of the IDF from infantry to armored forces.

Ben-Ari was born and raised in the Schöneberg locality of West Berlin, Germany, as Heinz Benner to a wealthy family of clothes merchant. When he was six, his mother remarried a German before dying two years later. Benner was 13 when he and his father watched the nearby synagogue go up in flames on Kristallnacht. Several days on he was expelled from school in a public ceremony where the principal ordered him, in the presence of the entire school, to march away and never return, because – as the headmaster shouted into the school courtyard – he belonged to "a race that committed horrible and heinous crimes against the German Empire and people." His father was murdered in the Holocaust, along with many of his relatives, but saved his son by sending him to Mandate Palestine as part of Youth Aliyah in 1939. Benner arrived in Kibbutz Ein Gev on the shores of Lake Kinneret where he became Uri Ben-Ari. In 1946 he enlisted in the Palmach and participated in most of Israel's wars.

He served at various command positions, including commander of the Armored Corps after the success during the Suez Crisis and deputy commander of the Southern Command during the Yom Kippur War.

He ended his service as commander of Armored Forces in reserve and was appointed Consul General of Israel in New York (1975–1978). Also, after the retirement he started writing books about his military service.

He is a recipient of the 1995 Yitzhak Sadeh Prize for Military Literature for his book Follow Me! ("!אחרי", literally "After me!"), a story of a company commander in the battle for Jerusalem during the 1947–1949 Palestine war.

His novel בטבעת החנק, "Betabat Hahenek" [In a Stranglehold] is based on his memories of a child growing up in Nazi Germany and tells the story of five Jewish boys in Berlin of 1933–1939.

In 1965 he married his third wife, Milka Ben-Ari. Ben-Ari had several children: two from his first marriage, two from the second, and two children of Milka. He was buried in the cemetery of kibbutz Shefayim.
