= Shlomo Kalo =

Bulgarian-Israeli writer and microbiologist

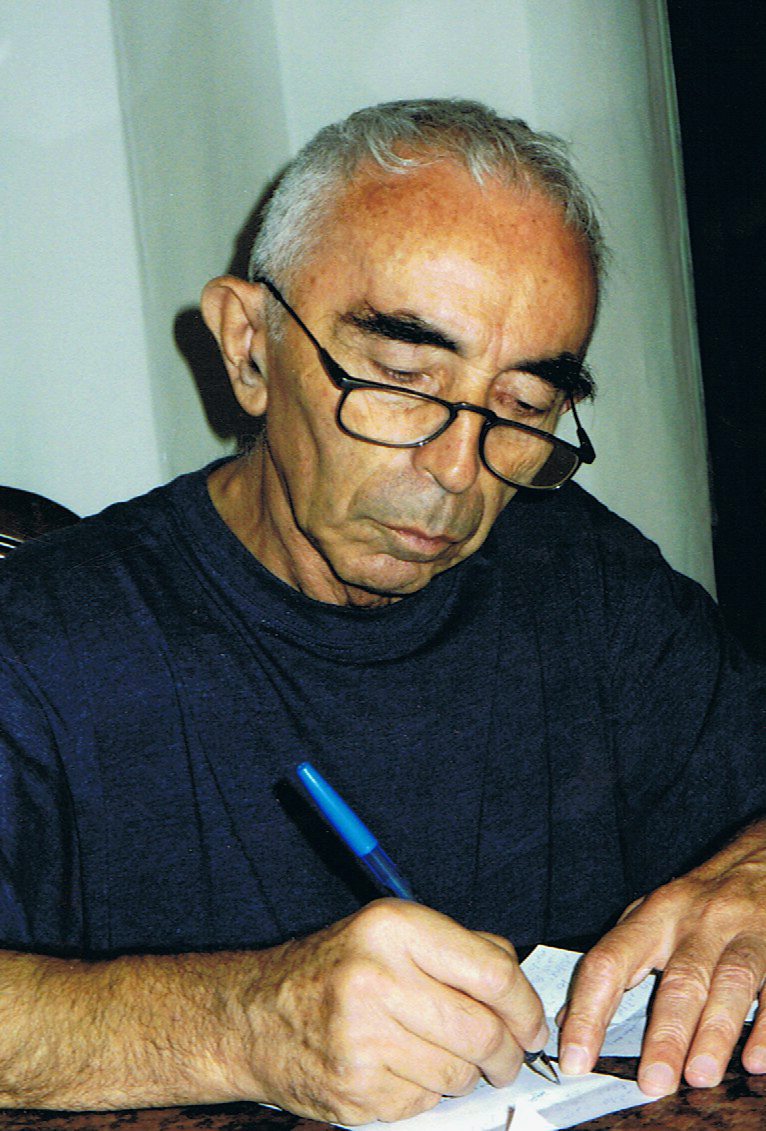
Kalo, 2003

Shlomo Kalo (Hebrew: שלמה קאלו; February 25, 1928 – August 30, 2014) was a writer and microbiologist. He published approximately 80 fiction and nonfiction books in Hebrew, some of which are published in translation internationally.

== Biography ==
Shlomo Kalo was born on 25 February 1928, in Sofia, Bulgaria. At the age of 12, Kalo joined the anti-Fascist underground in Bulgaria. Aged 15, when Bulgaria was under Nazi occupation, Kalo was imprisoned in an improvised concentration camp in Somovit.", Aged 18, in 1946, he won a prize in a poetry competition and went to Prague, where he studied medicine at the Charles University, worked as a freelance journalist and wrote short stories.

When the state of Israel was founded in 1948, Shlomo Kalo joined the Mahal ("Volunteers from abroad": individuals outside Israel who volunteered to fight together with the Israeli forces in its war of independence) and was trained as a pilot in Olomouc, Czechoslovakia. In 1949, at the age of 21 he immigrated to Israel. In 1958 he got his M.Sc. in microbiology at the Tel Aviv University. For 26 years till his retirement (in 1988) he worked as director of the medical laboratories of Kupat Holim Klalit health services, in Rishon-leZion. His first book in Hebrew, a collection of short stories, was published in 1954 by "Sifriyat ha-Poalim".

In 1969, a sharp turn in his life occurred (described in the last pages of his autobiographic novel "Erral"). It affected his life, thoughts and literary activity ever since. Kalo wrote about it: "First Sunday of the year 1969 AD, twelve noon. Body tensed like a bow-string. Not he. Warmth rising from the region of the heart. Not he. He stopped being what he was. He will no longer be as he was, forever and ever, for all eternity. He was, he is, he will be, forever and ever, for all eternity." In 1979 an informal group known as "DAAT" (Hebrew acronym, meaning knowledge, standing for "know yourself always") formed around Shlomo Kalo. This group had a varying number of members or supporters till it disbanded in 2009. Some well-known and influential journalists and artists (Shlomo Bar-Abba, Odetta Schwartz and Rivka Zohar, for example) were associated at times with the group.

In 2009, the Israeli newspaper Ha'aretz reported that rumours were persistent that Shlomo Kalo was among few Israeli writers who had been shortlisted as candidates for the Nobel Prize for Literature, similar reports were made by other news sites in 2010 and in 2011.

Shlomo Kalo was married to Rivka Zohar-Kalo, a prominent Israeli singer, who performs and records, among others, songs he has written (music and lyrics). Shlomo Kalo died at his home on August 30, Shabbat morning. His wife said on a Channel 2 TV interview that his summarizing last words were: "Everything is excellent to the one who is not subjugated".

He was the grandfather of Israeli-American blues-rock musician Bat-Or Kalo, who performs under the name KALO.

== Literary activity ==
In the 1960s two other works of his were published by "Am Oved" and won great appreciation. In 1969 he established a publishing house named "DAAT Publications", from which he retired after a few years, though he continued to publish most of his following titles there. During the 1970s he translated into Hebrew classical writings of Far-Eastern schools such as: Patanjeli's Yoga verses, The Bhagavadgita, Budha's Dhamapada, Tao-Te-Ching and others. During these years and later in the 1980s Kalo published several nonfiction titles dealing with philosophical, moral and spiritual topics (two out of his seven volumes of lectures were published in this decade). Some other titles were literary fiction about a philosophical issue ("The Self as Fighter", "The Gospel of the Absolute Free Will" and the novel "Like the Scarlet Thread"). A lot of his music and songs were written in this period.

During the following two decades Kalo continued to write prolifically in a variety of genres and styles. In the 1990s his first titles written in a newly introduced genre (the so-called "documented" stories) were published: "Forevermore" and "Moments of Truth", as well as his best-selling historical novel title "The Chosen", printed in first edition. During these two decades translation rights of some of his books were sold over in 17 countries.

Short stories written by Shlomo Kalo were published in literary magazines in Israel, among them literary supplements of large newspapers. Some of his stories were included in various anthologies celebrating Israel's Jubilee year and other occasions.

Prof. Gershon Shaked (Hebrew University) maintains in his Modern Fiction study (Indiana University, 2000; p 102-3) that Kalo's book "The Heap" marked 'two turning points in Hebrew Literary History; the beginning of modernist fiction in Israel, and the advent of Sephardi and Ashkenazi authors who wrote about the immigrant Sephardic community'. "The Heap," prof. Shaked continues, "has a special place in the history of Hebrew fiction because it is a neo-modernist social protest of an immigrant author". The novel is built around a number of immigrants who, reflecting their existential crisis, 'embody the archetype of human failure'.

Some 40 out of Kalo's 80 titles were published during the years 2000–2011.

== Other activities ==
1988 was the year when the extensive media exposure of Shlomo Kalo's contemplative and spiritual lifework began. Since that time, messages and solutions to a variety of issues have been both aired by national TV and radio channels, and widely covered by the press.

During the Kosovo Crisis in 1999 Shlomo Kalo was the most prominent Israeli intellectual who publicly protested against US and NATO military attacks on Yugoslavia.

== Bibliography ==
=== Fiction ===
- 1954: Kuhim BeYafo (Hebrew כוכים ביפו)
- 1962: ha-ʻAremah (Hebrew (הערימה
- 1966: Lev ha-baśar (Hebrew (לב הבשר
- 1979: ha-ʻAtsmi ke-loḥem (Hebrew (העצמי כלוחם
- 1983: Meshalim (Hebrew משלים)
- 1985: Masaʻ Atos (Hebrew מסע אתוס)
- 1987: Beśorat ha-ratson ha-ḥofshi ha-muḥlaṭ (Hebrew בשורת הרצון החופשי המוחלט)
- 1988: Ke-ḥuṭ ha-shani (Hebrew כחוט השני)
- 1990: Shekheneha shel dodati Rashel (Hebrew שכניה של דודתי ראשל)
- 1990: Ben kokhav aḥer (Hebrew בן כוכב אחר)
- 1991: ʻAlilotaṿ ha-muflaʼot shel Loiṭenlib le-Vet Meyunkhaʼuzen (Hebrew עלילותיו המופלאות של לויטנליב לבית מיונכאוזן)
- 1993: Melekh u-shemo ahavah (Hebrew מלך ושמו אהבה)
- 1994: ha-Nivḥar (Hebrew הנבחר)
- 1995: ʻAd ʻolam (Hebrew עד עולם)
- 1995: Regaʻim shel emet (Hebrew רגעים של אמת)
- 1996: ha-Mikhnasayim (Hebrew המכנסיים)
- 1999: ha-Dolar ṿeha-eḳdaḥ (Hebrew הדולר והאקדח)
- 2000: Ḥaṭifah (Hebrew חטיפה)
- 2002: ʻAd sheha-maṿet yeḥaber benehem (Hebrew עד שהמוות יחבר ביניהם)
- 2003: Samurai : shaḥ maṭ (Hebrew סמוראי)
- 2003: Shenat arbaʻ-ʻeśreh la-sefirah she-lo heḥelah (Hebrew שנת ארבע־עשרה לספירה שלא החלה)
- 2004: Pashuṭ (Hebrew פירוש)
- 2005: Thriller (Hebrew Thriller)
- 2006: Mifgashim (Hebrew מפגשים)
- 2006: Mishpaḥat Ṿais (Hebrew משפחת וייס)
- 2007: Migrash ḥanayah (Hebrew מגרש חניה)
- 2007: Shete novelot (Hebrew שתי נובלות)
- 2008: Ḥarig (Hebrew חריג)
- 2008: Lili (Hebrew לילי)
- 2008: Shaʻare ha-barzel ha-ʻatiḳim (Hebrew שערי הברזל העתיקים)
- 2009: ha-Na'ar ha-Hungari (Hebrew הנער ההונגרי)
- 2009: Trepan (Hebrew (טראפן
- 2009: Tisis (Hebrew טיסיס)
- 2009: Jenny (Hebrew ג'ני)
- 2010: Jewish Faust – A play in one act (Hebrew פאוסט היהודי)
- 2011: No Complaints (Hebrew אין תלונות)
- 2012: Shigela Shiga (Hebrew שיגלה שיגה)

=== Nonfiction ===
- 1974: Zen ṿe-ḥakhme zen. Translation. (Hebrew (זן וחכמי זן
- 1976: Shir ha-Elohim The Bhagavad Gita. Translation.
- 1981: ʻAśui li-veli ḥat (Hebrew (עשוי לבלי חת
- 1982: Du-śiaḥ shel ḥerut (Hebrew (דו־שיח של חרות
- 1984: Atah hinkha atah (Hebrew (אתה הנך אתה
- 1984: Maʻagal ha-ʻotsmah ha-Ṭibeṭi. Translation, retold (Hebrew (מעגל העוצמה הטיבטי
- 1985: Omanut ha-milḥamah le-ḥerut-emet (Hebrew (אמנות המלחמה לחרות־אמת
- 1988: Yedidai
- 1989: ha-Emet hi ḥedṿah (Hebrew (האמת היא חדווה
- 1990: Ahavah menatsaḥat kol (Hebrew (אהבה מנצחת כל
- 1991: Le-hatḥil ha-kol me-ḥadash (Hebrew (להתחיל הכל מחדש
- 1993: Gam lo bi-fene ʻatsmekha (Hebrew (גם לא בפני עצמך
- 1996: ha-Dimui (Hebrew הדימוי)
- 1996: Ṿe-hineh hu ba (Hebrew (והנה הוא בא
- 1997: ha-Enʼonim ke-mashal (Hebrew (האינאונים כמשל
- 1997: ha-Matat she-lo hikhzivah (Hebrew (המתת שלא הכזיבה
- 1999: Le-lo perush ṿe-tosafot (Hebrew (ללא פירוש ותוספות
- 1999: Masaʻʼel (Hebrew (מסעאל
- 2000: Har ha-osher (Hebrew (הר האושר
- 2000: Teshuvot (Hebrew (תשובות
- 2001: ʻIm G'uliʼan (Hebrew (עם ג׳וליאן
- 2002: Ḳandar (Hebrew (קנדר
- 2002: Ḳav hafrada (Hebrew (קו הפרדה
- 2003: Matemaṭiḳah rom (Hebrew (מתמטיקה רום
- 2004: Kata (Hebrew (קטה
- 2007: ha-Hebeṭ ha-aḥer (Hebrew (ההיבט האחר
- 2007: Ḳatedralah (Hebrew קתדרלה)
- 2007: Hitnatslut (Hebrew (התנצלות
- 2009: Hevel Ure'ut Ru'ah (Hebrew הבל ורעות רוח)

=== Autobiographies ===
- 2001: Athar (Hebrew אטאר)
- 2004: ʻErʻal (Hebrew ערעל)

=== Poetry ===
- 2006: 18 Hagihim (Hebrew שמונה-עשר הגיחים)
- 2008: Hagihim II (Hebrew (הגיחים 2
- 2008: Shirei Herut – complete edition with music notes and CD (Hebrew (שירי חרות
- 2011: Hagihim III (Hebrew הגיחים 3)

=== Translated books ===
- The Dollar and the Gun (theme connected stories), Calder Publications, UK
- The Self as Fighter (literary fiction, bordering philosophy), St. Pauls Publications, UK
- The Chosen (historical novel), D.A.T. publications
- Lili (novel), D.A.T. Publications
- Erral (autobiographical novel), D.A.T. Publications
- Athar (autobiographical novel), D.A.T. Publications
- The Trousers – Parables for the 21st Century (parables collection), D.A.T. Publications
- Forevermore (documented stories), D.A.T. Publications
- The Fantastical Adventures of Leutenlieb of the House of Munchausen (humor), D.A.T. Publications

Kalo's books have been translated into: English, French, German, Spanish, Italian, Polish, Greek, Malayalam, Bulgarian, Portuguese, Korean, Serbo-Croatian, Hungarian, and Romanian.

== Sources ==
- DAT Publications' archive
- Shaked, Gershon; Miller Budick, Emily: Modern Hebrew fiction. Bloomington: Indiana University Press, 2000. – ISBN 978-0-253-33711-5. S. 184
- Royle, Nicholas: 'The Dollar and the Gun' . In: Time Out, 23 Juli 2003, S. 58
