= Shlomo Artzi =

Israeli folk rock singer-songwriter

Shlomo Artzi שלמה ארצי
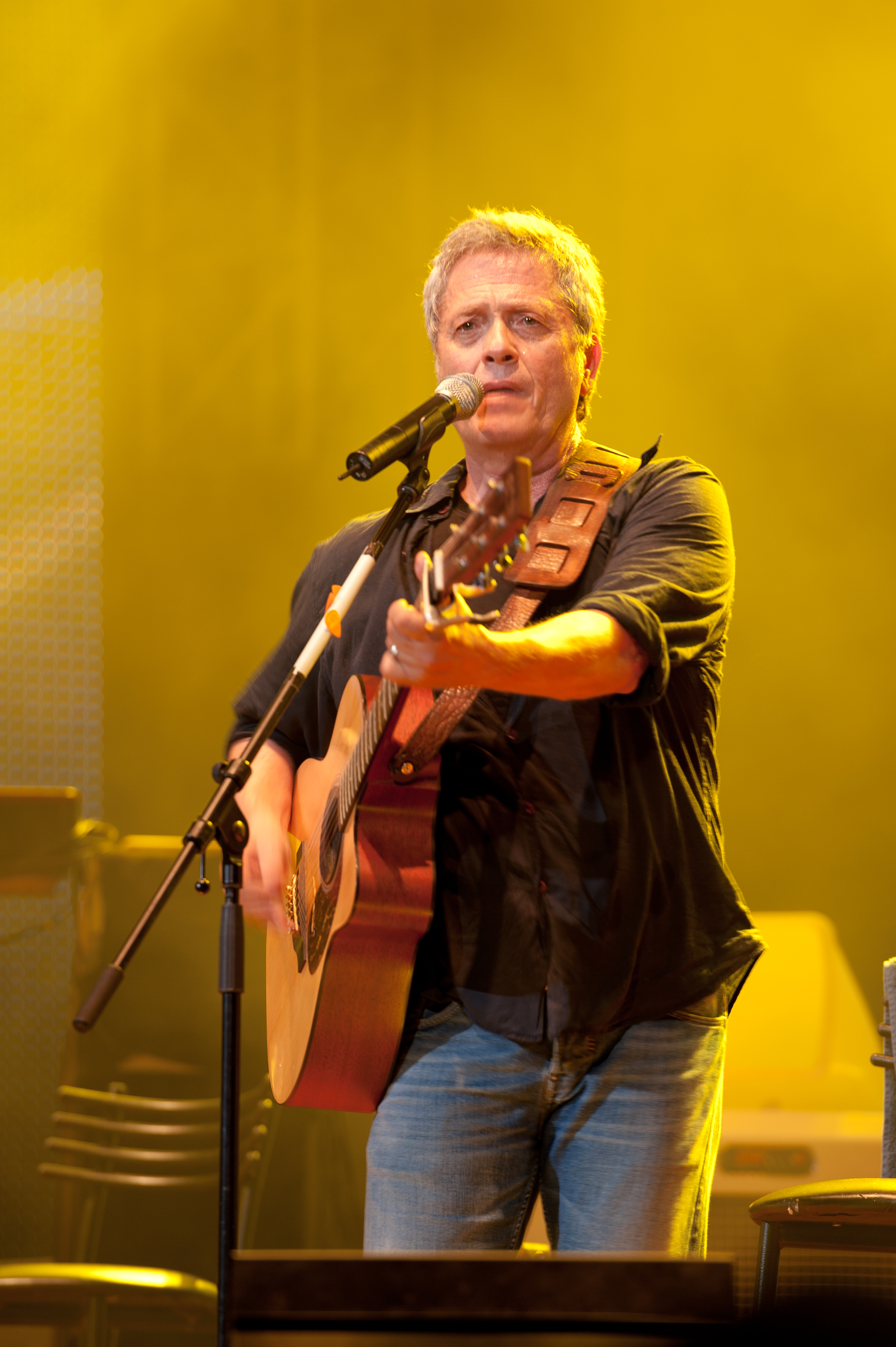
- Shlomo Artzi in concert in Caesarea, 2010

Background information
- Born: November 26, 1949 (age 76); Alonei Abba, Israel
- Origin: Tel Aviv, Israel.
- Genres: Folk rock, pop rock
- Years active: 1969–present
- Label: Hed Artzi
- Formerly of: Israeli Navy Band

Shlomo Artzi (Hebrew: שלמה ארצי; born 26 November 1949) is an Israeli folk rock musician, composer, music producer, radio host and singer-songwriter. He is one of the most popular and successful musicians in Israel.

== Biography ==
Shlomo Artzi was born on Moshav Alonei Abba. Artzi's parents were Holocaust survivors and their memories deeply influenced him and his sister Nava Semel, a playwright. His father, Yitzhak Artzi, a Zionist activist in Bukovina, Romania in his youth, was later a member of the Knesset. His maternal grandmother was the sister of Rabbi Meir Shapiro.

When Artzi was eight years old, his family moved to north Tel Aviv. Artzi's schoolmates thought he would become an actor, not a musician, as he was known for his acting skills at elementary school. However, at the age of twelve, he started playing the guitar and singing in a boy scouts group and at friends' parties. Artzi has been married twice and has three children from his first marriage: Ben Artzi (singer), Shiri Artzi (author married to Yiftach Klein), and Jonathan Artzi.

Artzi resides in Ramat Gan. He is a fan of the football club Maccabi Netanya and composed its championship song in 1971.

== Music career ==
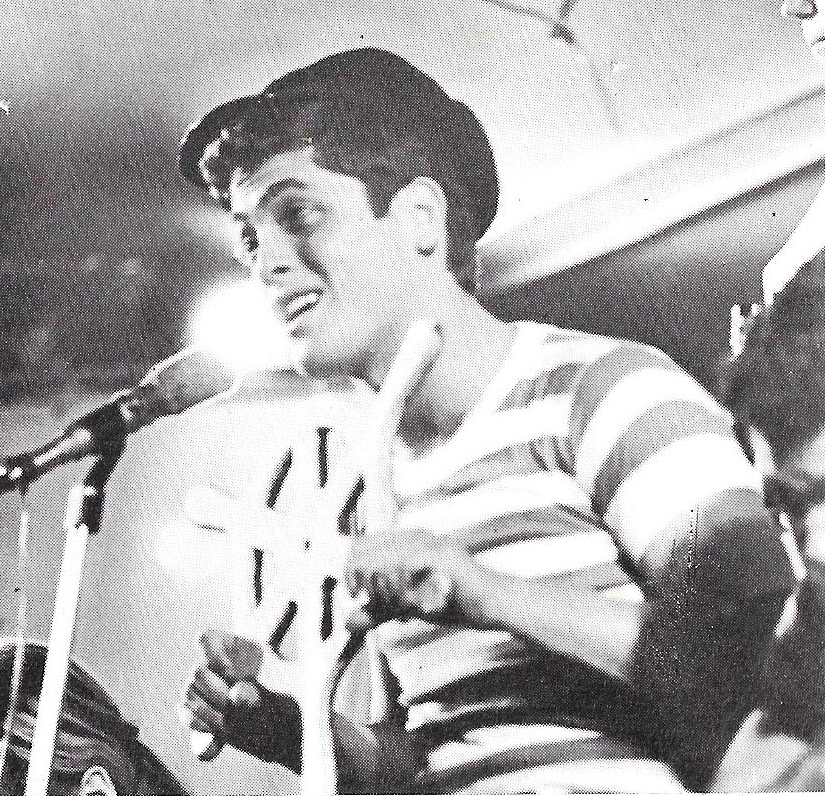
Artzi during his service in the Israeli Navy Band.

=== 1960s: Teen and army bands ===
At age 16, he began writing and composing songs. As the Sinai Duo, he started performing before soldiers, along with his classmate Rivka Menashe, who later gained fame as Riki Gal.

During his military service, Artzi was recruited to the Artillery Corps, and after serving for a year and a half, he joined Lehakat Kheil Hayam (Israeli Navy Band). While in this band, he took part in the programs "And on the Third Day" and "Rhapsody in Blue", alongside other soon-to-be Israeli celebrities, such as Rivka Zohar, Dov Glickman, Avi Uriah and Riki Gal. He was yet to stand out during the first program. By the second program, he became the lead singer and one of the main stars. He sang lead vocals on songs such as "The Sailor Gabriel" and "When I Grow Up".

=== 1970s: Emerging and evolving as a solo singer ===
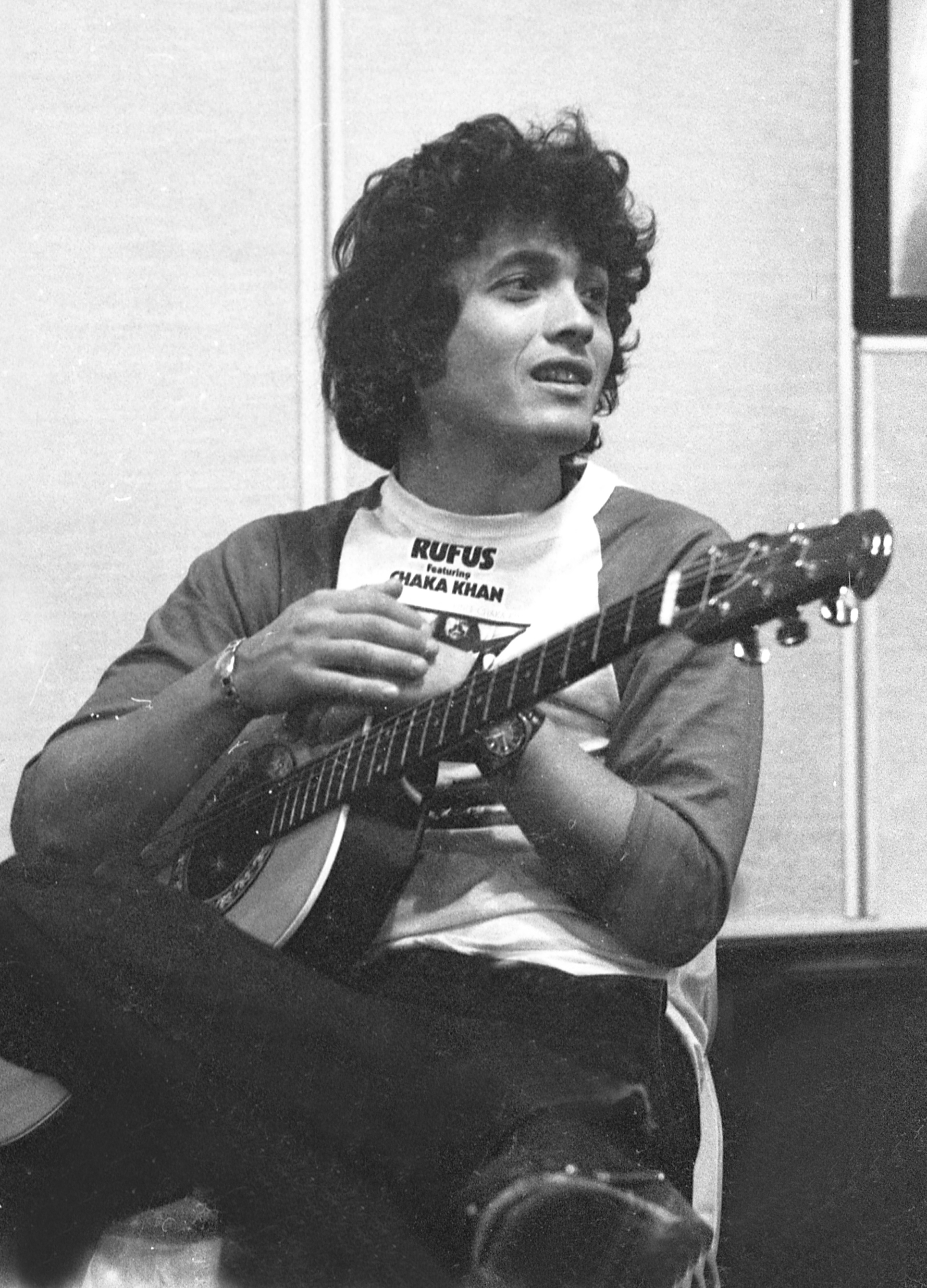
Shlomo Artzi in 1975, preparing for his performance in the Eurovision Song Contest 1975.

In 1970, Artzi competed in the Israel Song Festival. Still in military service and wearing a military uniform, he sang Pitom Achshav, Pitom Hayom (Suddenly Now, Suddenly Today), also known as "Ahavtiha" (I loved her). The song, written by Tirtza Atar and composed by Ya'akov Hollaender, won first prize. It was included in his first album, Shlomo Artzi, which came out in 1970, and came in first in the annual chart-toppers countdown of Kol Israel. Artzi was voted Singer of the Year.

In 1975, he was selected to represent Israel in the Eurovision Song Contest. The selected song was At Ve'Ani (You and Me), written by Israeli songwriter Ehud Manor, and composed by Artzi himself. "At Va'Ani" won 11th place.

Over the next few years, Artzi's records did not sell well and he produced few hit singles. Most of these albums became rare collectibles. In 1977, he made "He lost his way…" (גבר הולך לאיבוד, Gever Holekh Le'ibud) whose success convinced Artzi to continue singing. In 1979, he recorded Drachim (Ways), with a fresher style. His 1981 LP "Khatzot" (Midnight) was the second part of "Drachim".

=== 1980s: Dance, Restless Night, July-August Heat ===
Artzi's fame rose throughout the 1980s and reached a peak with the release of the albums "Dance" (Tirkod) and "Restless Night" (לילה לא שקט, Layla Lo Shaket) which sold tens of thousands. He began to appear in the country's largest parks and theatres.

In 1980, Artzi hosted his radio show on Israeli Army Radio (Galei Tzahal). In this show, he talked about the week's headlines and told interesting stories about things he heard or saw. "Od lo Shabbat" (It's not Sabbath yet) was broadcast on Fridays.

His records "Tirkod" (Dance, 1984), "Layla Lo Shaket" (Restless Night, 1986), and "Hom Yuli August" (July-August Heat, 1988) albums sold hundred thousand copies, and his live shows at Israel's largest concert venues were fully booked.

=== 1990s: Ticket to the Luna Park, Moon, Two ===
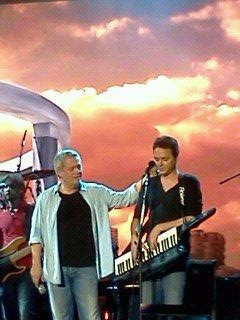
Shlomo Artzi with his son, Ben

Artzi opened the nineties with the album "Kartis Laluna Park" ("Ticket to Luna Park"), produced by Louis Lahav and arranged by Adi Rennert. Artzi wrote and composed most of the songs on the album, including "Nikhnast Lechayay", "Rocker Chayay", "Me-Ever LaNahar" and "Agadat HaEsrim VeAhat". Rennert composed the song "Situatia" to the words of Artzi. After the great successes of his previous albums, the album was considered a commercial failure, and did not leave many hits, although it did not stop the glory days of Artzi.

In 1992, Artzi released Yareah (Hebrew: ירח, Moon), one of his most successful albums. Out of twelve songs on it, eight became radio hits and finally solidified Artzi's status in Israeli popular music.

In 1995, popular Israeli musicians recorded a CD together in memory of Yitzhak Rabin, named "Shalom Chaver". Shlomo Artzi played two songs during the memorial service, which later became anthems of those days – "Haish Ha'hu" (That Man) and "Uf Gozal" (Fly Little Bird), which was originally written and recorded by Arik Einstein and Miki Gavrielov.

In 1996, Artzi released a double album called "Shnayim" ("Two"), selling an almost unprecedented 160,000 copies, making it a certified 4× platinum record. The most notable songs in this CD were the title track, sung with Israeli singer Rita, "Hi Lo Yoda'at Ma Over Alai" ("She Doesn't Know What I'm Going Through"), '"Menagev Lakh Et Hadmaot" ("Wiping Away Your Tears ") "Ze Ma Shenish'ar" ("That's What's Left"), "Ha'ahava Hayeshana" ("The Old Love"), "Le'an, Le'an, Le'an" ("Where, Where, Where"), "Shisha" ("Six"), "Absurd" and "Dokh Retzhakh" ("Murder Report") on the assassination of Prime Minister Yitzhak Rabin compared to that of JFK. "Shnayim" signaled the beginning of a string of original material, among them some of the best-selling Israeli records of all time.

=== 2000s: I Loved Them, Thirst, Sane ===
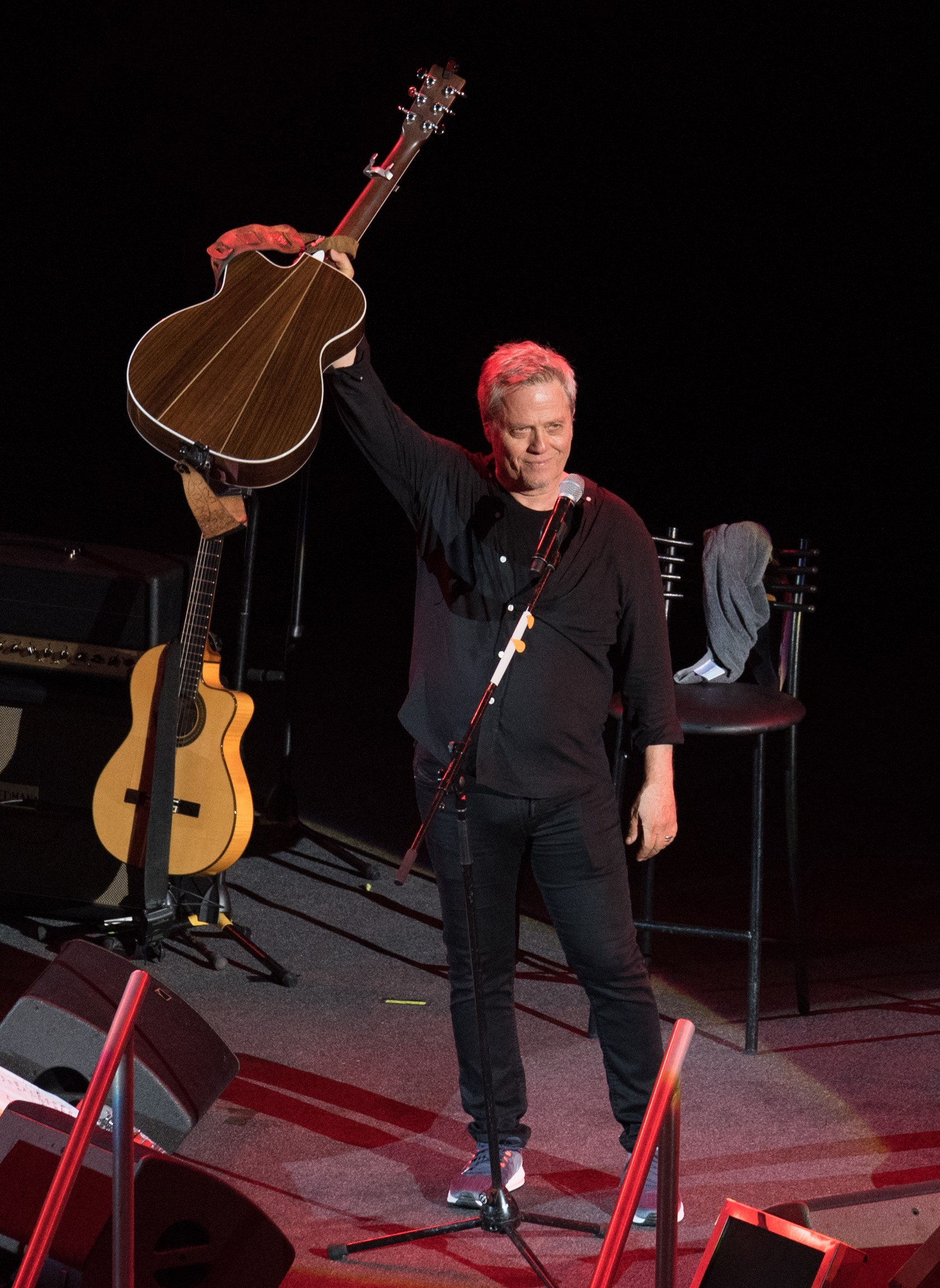
Performing in Caesarea amphitheater, 2018

In 2000, Artzi released "Ahavtihem" ("I Loved Them"), a collection of reworked love songs, many originally written by him for other artists. The album featured a revision of his hit "Ahavtiha" ("I Loved Her"), "Nof Yaldoot" ("Scenes from Childhood"), "Anakhnu Lo Tzrikhim" ("We Don't Need"), "At Va'ani" ("You and Me"), "Ma'avir Daf" ("Turning the Page") – a duet with Nurit Galron (who performed the song originally), "Shir Preda" ("A Goodbye Song") – a duet with his singer-songwriter son, Ben Artzi and "Melekh ha'olam" ("King of the World", a Hebrew-translated cover of the White Plains song "When You Are a King"). The album went on to sell over 200,000 copies – an unprecedented achievement in the little Israeli music market.

"Tzima'on" ("Thirst"), released in 2002, featured the title track as its lead single, as well as "Al-Pi Tnuat Harakavot" ("The Way the Trains Run") LeHatzil Otakh ("To Save You") and "Ptzatzat Atom Bashamaim" ("Atom Bomb in the Sky"). The albums sold over 60,000 copies (3× gold record) in the first two weeks of their release but the reviews were critical. Artzi later described these albums as flawed.

In 2007, Artzi released "Shfuyim" ("Sane"). The album came out in July, with a lead single "Ha'amiti" ("The Real"). His collaboration with Mooke (of the Rap-Rock band Shabak Samekh) was panned. "Nitzmadnu" helped to restore his reputation with a catchy sing-along melodic line and lyrics. The came one of Artzi's most enduring hits, "TeTa'aru Lakhem" ("Imagine Yourselves"), with a romantic message: "Imagine yourselves a beautiful world, a little less sad than it actually is, and there we are, walking, with sunshine in our pockets".

=== 2010s: Happiness Express, Whipped Cream ===
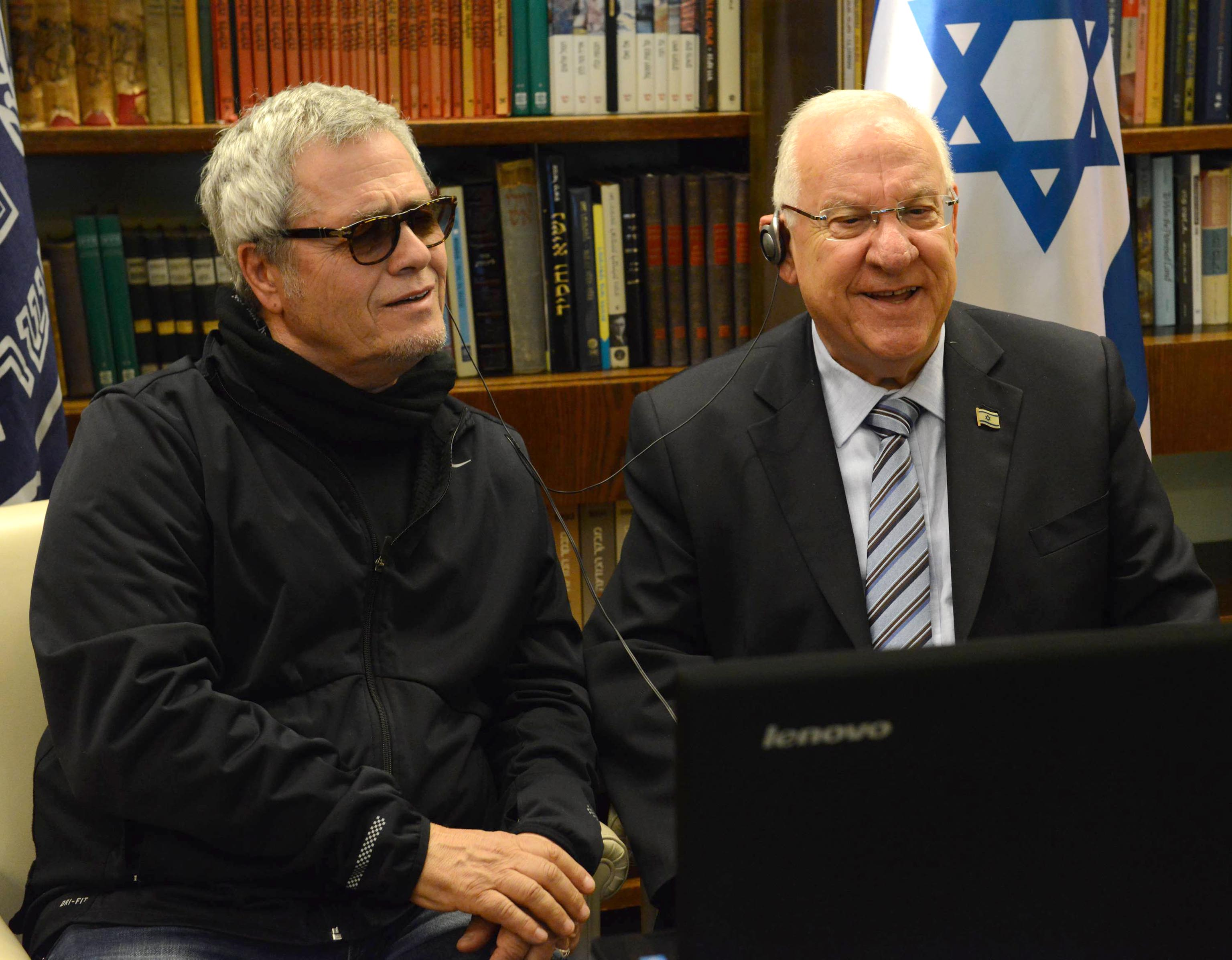
Shlomo Artzi with Reuven Rivlin, then-president of Israel in 2015, re-recording Artzi's 1970 song "Ahavtiha" for Israel's Independence Day.

In 2012, Artzi finally released "Osher Express" ("Happiness Express"). This album enjoyed critical acclaim and commercial success. It featured a strong collection of new songs, beloved singles, and an intriguing lead-off single: "Khozrim Habaita" ("Coming Home") which featured the iconic Israeli singer Arik Einstein. This was followed by "Kol Yom" ("Every Day"), a life-affirming duet with Dudu Tasa "Latet Velakakhat" ("Negotiating"), and a spiritual duet with Abraham Tal "Elohim" ("God"). Additional singles produced at this time were "Nedaber Mehalev" ("Let's Speak from the Heart") and "Shelo Ye'almu Hadvarim Hayafim" ("Hoping the Beautiful Things Don't Disappear"). The album included "Ometz" ("Courage"), "Florida", and Artzi's unique take on the wave of social protests in 2012, "Kayitz Be'eretz Lu" ("Summer in If-Land").

In 2016, Artzi released "Katzefet" ("Whipped Cream").

== Honors ==
In 2018, Artzi was honored as one of the ceremonial torchbearers for Israel's 70th Independence Day.

== See also ==
- Music of Israel

Awards and achievements
| Preceded by Kaveret with Natati La Khayay | Israel in the Eurovision Song Contest; 1975 | Succeeded by Chocolate, Menta, Mastik with Emor Shalom |
