= Shefayim =

Kibbutz in central Israel

Shefayim: שְׁפָיִים (Hebrew)
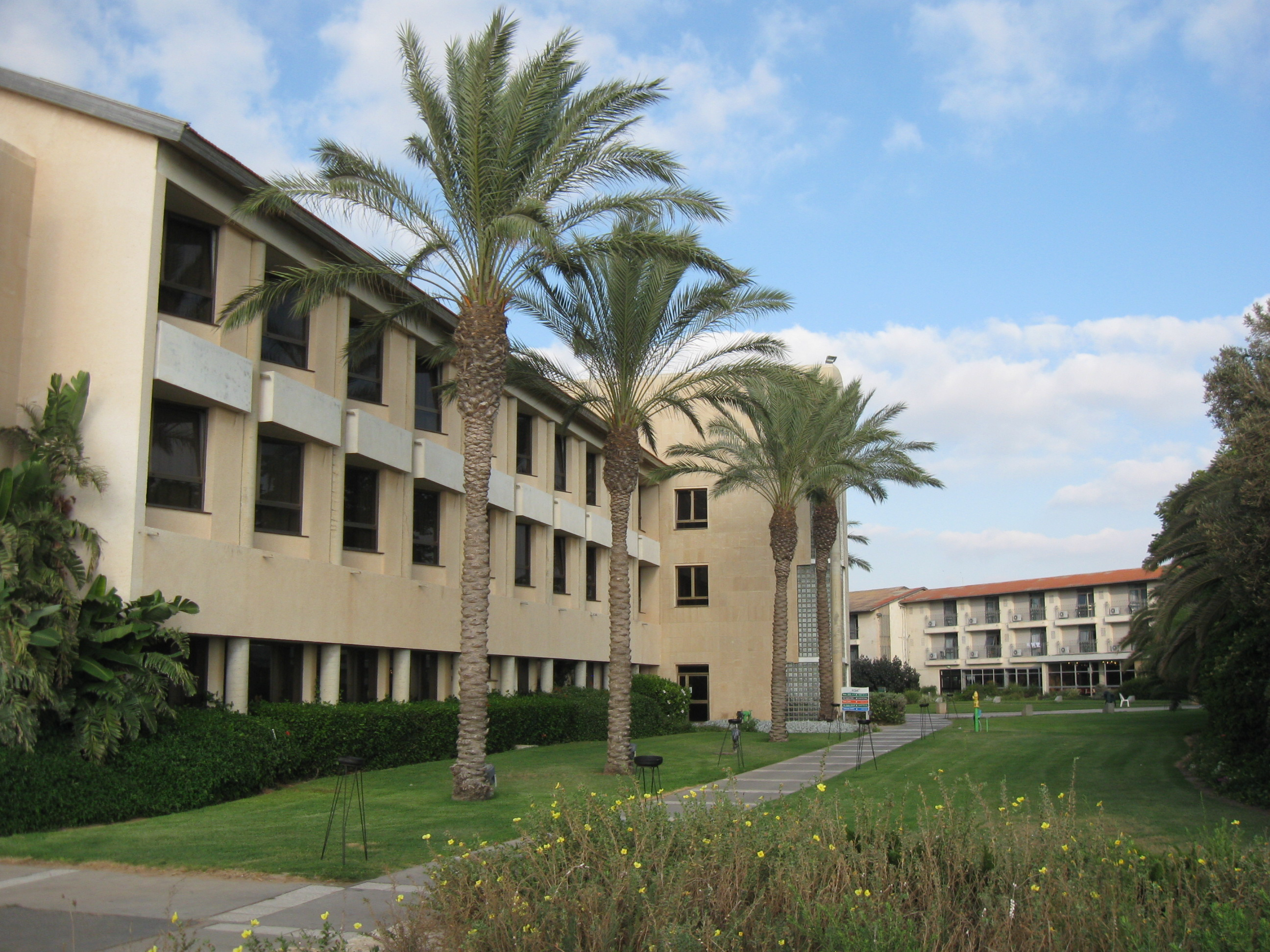

- Location within Central Israel Location within Israel
- Coordinates: 32°13′2″N 34°49′28″E
- Country: Israel
- District: Central
- Subdistrict: HaSharon
- Council: Hof HaSharon
- Affiliation: Kibbutz Movement
- Founded: 1935
- Founder: Polish Jews
- Population (2024): 1,514
- Website: www.shefayim.co.il/english.html (in English)

Shefayim (Hebrew: שְׁפָיִים, lit. High Hills) is a kibbutz in central Israel located 2.5 miles north of Herzliya along the Mediterranean coast. Shefayim falls under the jurisdiction of Hof HaSharon Regional Council. In 2024 it had a population of 1,514.

== History ==
Kibbutz Shefayim was established in 1935 by Jewish immigrants from Poland. The name is taken from the Book of Isaiah: "I will open rivers in high hills." During the British Mandate for Palestine, Shefayim was a base for clandestine immigration.

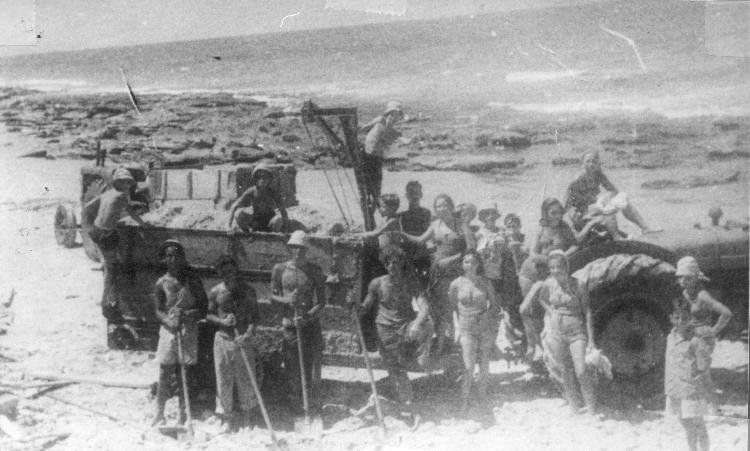
Members of Palmach loading gravel in Shefayim, July 1947

In the 1948 Arab–Israeli War, it absorbed refugees from the abandoned kibbutz Beit HaArava near the Dead Sea.

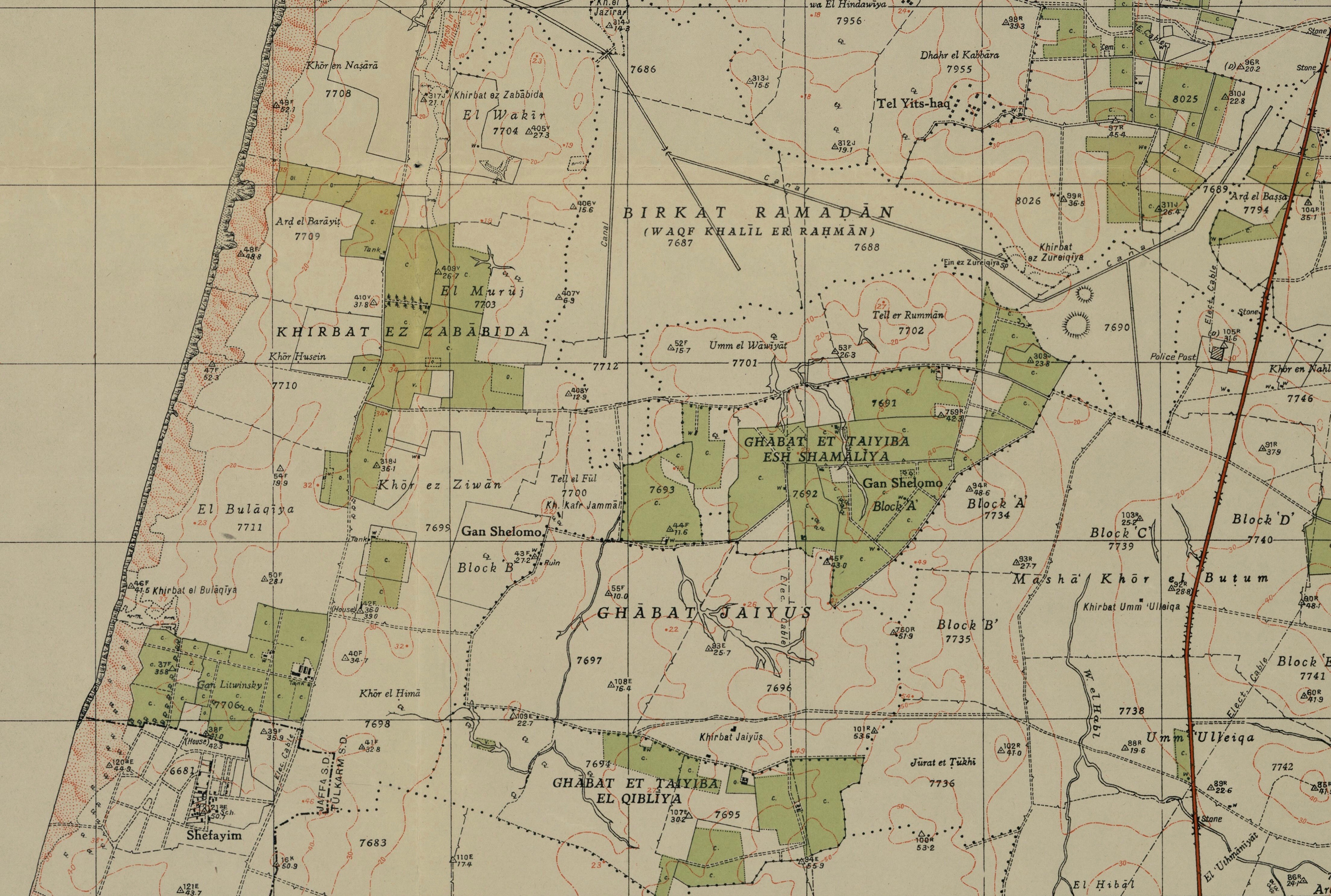
Shefayim 1944 1:20,000 (bottom left)

In the early 1970s, the kibbutz established Polycad, a plastics factory. In the early 1980s, it established the Shafit biotechnology plant. In the mid-1990s, it acquired the Zirei Israel plant, which has become a leader in the Israeli cotton-ginning industry.

In 2012 IBM acquired New York- and Shefayim-based mobile application developer Worklight Ltd., founded in 2006 by Shahar Kaminitz, formerly of Amdocs.

== Economy ==
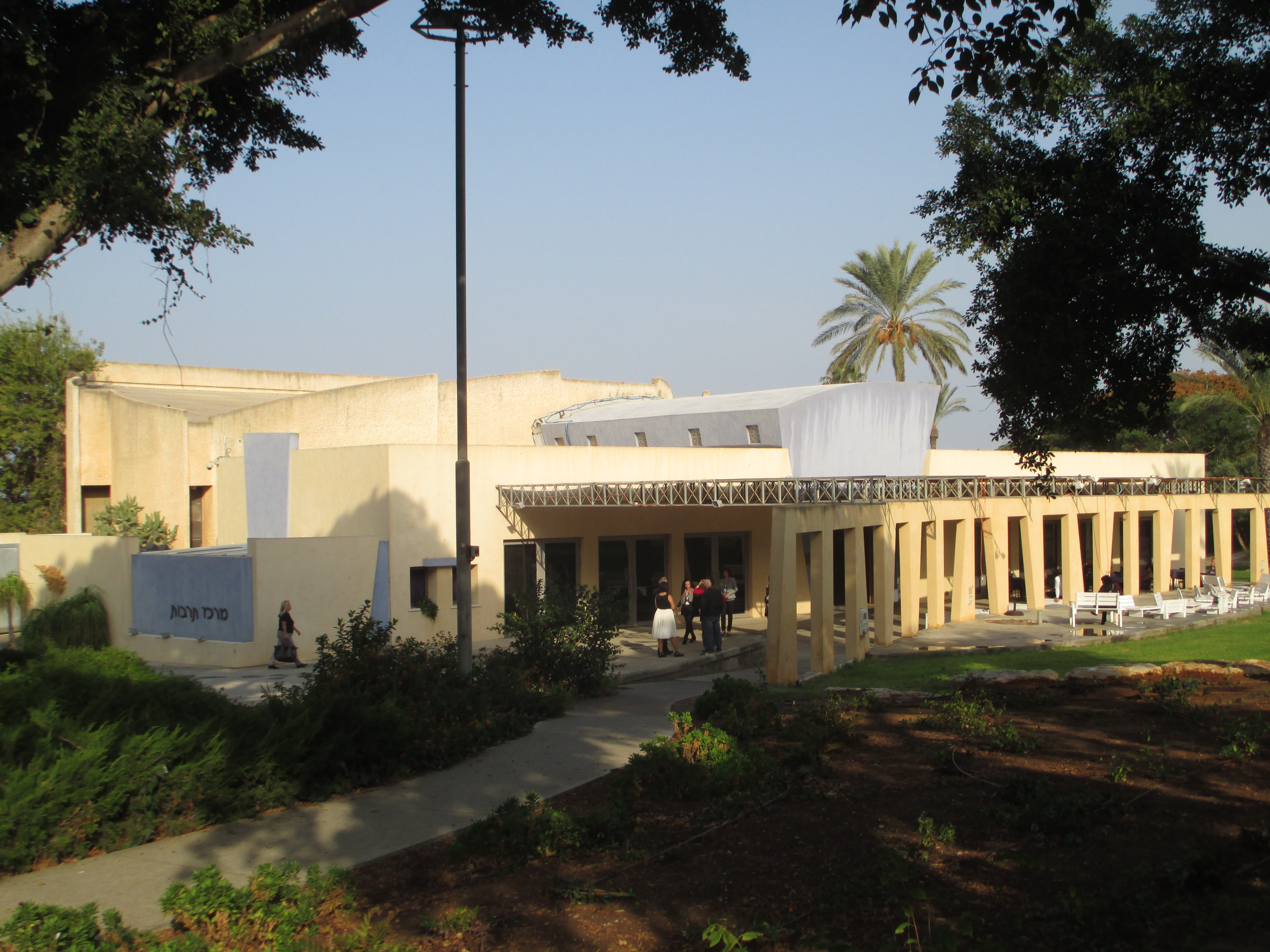
Shefayim cultural center

Kibbutz Shefayim is among the wealthiest kibbutzim and was one of the few that did not require debt assistance from the state and banks during the recession in the 1980s. On the contrary, Shefayim contributed NIS 4 million to help failing kibbutzim. The main income source of the kibbutz is Hutzot Shefayim, a shopping mall, on real-estate previously classified as agricultural land. Other sources of income are a hotel and conference center, and a water park.

== Notable people ==
- Uri Ben-Ari (1925-2009), armored corps commander, diplomat and author; buried at the kibbutz cemetery
- Orit Noked (born 1952), former member of the Knesset
- Yaakov Rechter (1924–2001) – architect, Israel Prize recipient
- Rachel Shapira (born 1945), songwriter and poet
- Hirsch Smolar (1905-1993), Yiddish writer and journalist and social activist in Poland, buried at the kibbutz cemetery
