= Yair Rosenblum =

Israeli musical artist (1944–1996)

Yair Rosenblum יאיר רוזנבלום
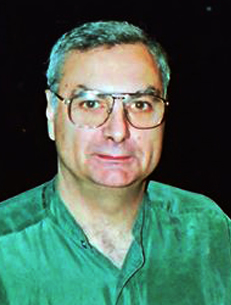

Background information
- Born: 6 January 1944; Tel Aviv, Mandate of Palestine.
- Origin: Tel Aviv, Israel.
- Died: 27 August 1996 (aged 52) Holon, Israel
- Genres: Israeli pop, Israeli rock.
- Occupations: Composer; Arranger
- Years active: 1962-1996
- Label: Hed Arzi Music
- Formerly of: The Nahal Band

Yair Rosenblum (Hebrew: יאיר רוזנבלום; 6 January 1944 – 27 August 1996) was an Israeli composer and arranger.

== Early life ==
Rosenblum was born in Tel Aviv, Mandatory Palestine. He served in the Israel Defense Forces as a member of Lehakat HaNahal, where he began his musical career.

== Music career ==
Rosenblum was the musical director of the Israel Defense Forces chorus during the 1960s and 1970s. He directed Israel’s annual music festivals in Arad and oversaw conducting and composition for the Israeli military ensembles. He composed several well-known songs, including Shir LaShalom (1969). He composed music for films and television and worked with various bands and choral groups, primarily the military ensembles.

Over his career, Rosenblum wrote more than 1,000 songs, including Ammunition Hill, In a Red Dress, The Beautiful Life, Tranquility, Hallelujah, How Should I Bless Him?, and We Must Keep On Singing. In addition to composing for military ensembles such as Lehakat HaNahal, he wrote music for a number of Israeli performers, including Ilanit, Ofra Haza, Rivka Michaeli, Yossi Banai, and HaGashash HaHiver.

== Death and commemoration ==
Rosenblum died in Holon in 1996, at the age of 52, from esophageal cancer, which he had for two years. After Rosenblum's death, his daughter Karen accepted the Prize for Lifetime Achievement from the Society of Authors, Composers and Music Publishers in Israel on his behalf.

On 22 April 2009, the Israeli Stamp Service issued a series of 12 postal stamps on the subject of Israeli music. One of the stamps in this collection was dedicated in memory of Rosenblum. The stamp, with a portrait of Rosenblum, was designed by the artist Miri Nestor Sofer. The stamp's tab included a line from Rosenblum's song "Shir Lashalom" (Song for Peace) - "Therefore just sing a song for peace".
