= Smadar Shir =

Israeli author

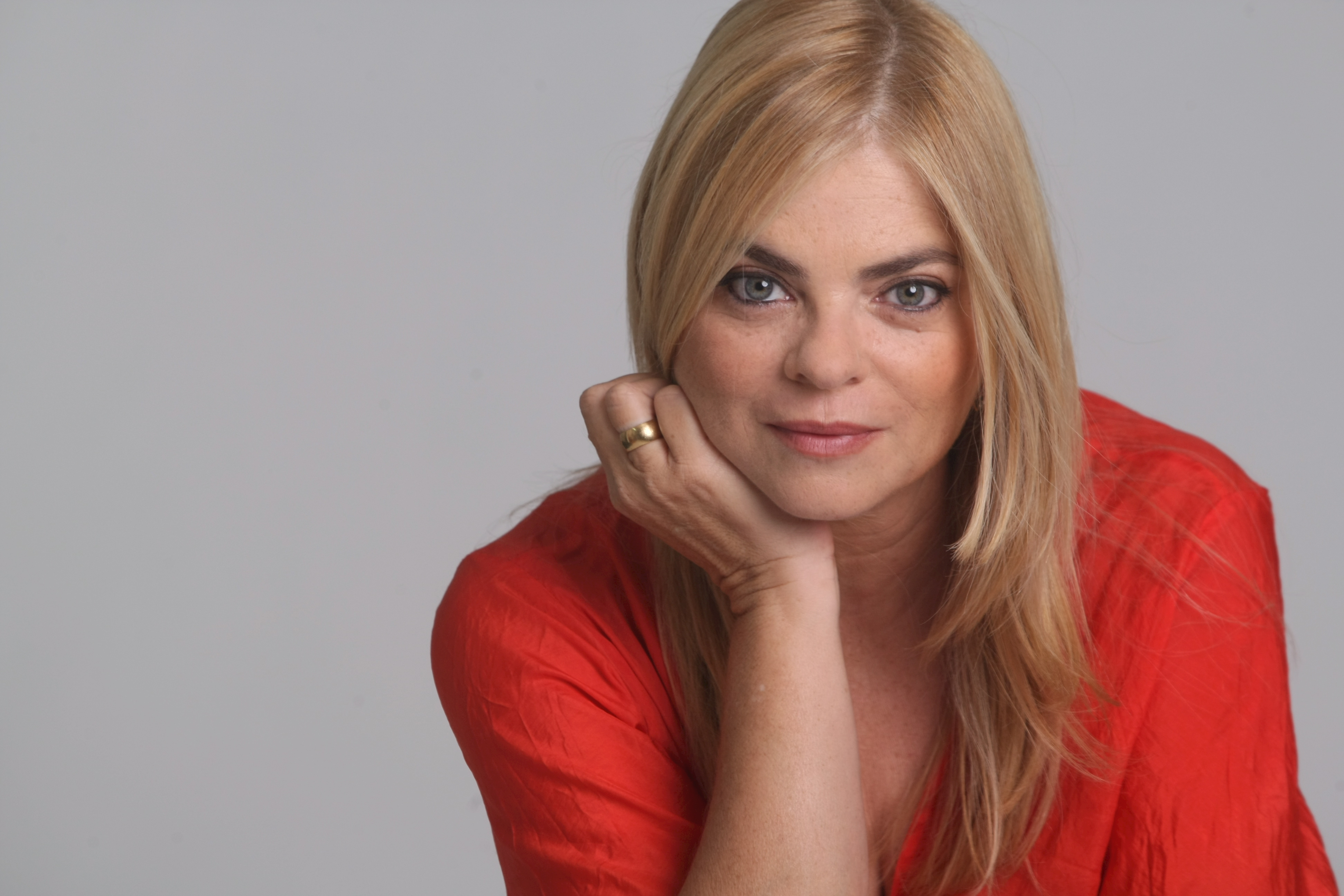
Shir in 2009

Smadar Shir-Sidi (Hebrew: סמדר שיר; born September 10, 1957) is an Israeli writer, journalist, playwright and songwriter. She has written over 400 books.

== Biography ==
Shir was born Smadar Sheinman and grew up in Tel Aviv. Her mother was a teacher and her father an engineer. She is a graduate of the "Zeitlin" religious high school then studied literature and general philosophy at Tel Aviv University

Shir started writing at the age of 5 and by the age of 8 was an editor in the children's weekly "Haaretz Shelanu" and was later a youth reporter at" Maariv for Youth". She wrote her first book, "Monologues of a Girl", at the age of 16.

She chose the pen name Smadar Shir (which later became her official name) on the advice of the writer Tirsha Ether so that the religious school would not know that she writes for secular newspapers. After she became a mother, she began to write books and series intended for children almost From the age of zero. In doing so, she became one of the most successful children's and youth writers in Israel.
