= Dudaim (disambiguation) =

The Dudaim (Hebrew: הדודאים) was an Israeli folk duo.

Dudaim or Duda'im may also refer to:

- Dudaim Waste Facility, Negev Desert, Israel
- Dudaim Wadi (Nakhal Duda'im, Naẖal Duda'im), Negev Desert, Israel
- Tel Duda'im a hill ijn Haifa district, Israel
- Dudaim melon, a variant of Cucumis melo (melon)
