= Music of Israel =

The music of Israel incorporates a variety of musical traditions. Since the First Aliyah of Jews to Palestine in the 1880s, local musical styles have developed alongside the adoption of international genres. Since the 1960s, Israeli music has become increasingly diverse, expanding into rock, folk, jazz, and classical.

From the earliest days of Jewish settlement in Palestine, music played a central role in cultural life. Hebrew songs and public singalongs (shira b'tzibur) were promoted on a national level and enjoyed institutional support. Sing-alongs became a popular social activity and contributed to the formation of Israeli Jewish identity. Jewish immigrants brought with them musical traditions from their countries of origin, which blended over time with the local music of Palestine, influencing the evolution of a distinct Israeli musical style. The use of music as a means of fostering Israeli nationalism and culture has continued.

== History ==
=== Early history ===
The development of a body of music associated with the Zionist settlers in Palestine began during the First Aliyah, the initial significant wave of Jewish immigration to the region in the 1880s. Zionist youth movements in Germany and other European countries compiled some of the earliest songbooks for the Zionist movement, combining newly written Hebrew lyrics with existing melodies from European folk songs. An example of this practice is the song Hatikvah, which later became the national anthem of Israel.

In 1895, Jewish settlers established the first Jewish orchestra in Palestine. The orchestra was a wind band based in Rishon LeZion. Its repertoire included light classical pieces and marches.

Abraham Zevi Idelsohn, a trained cantor from Russia and a musicologist, settled in Jerusalem in 1906 with the aim of studying and documenting the musical traditions of the Jewish communities living there. At that time, Jerusalem was home to several distinct Jewish enclaves, including Yemenite, Hasidic, and Syrian. Idelsohn systematically recorded and analyzed the songs and musical styles of these communities. He also undertook the first efforts to introduce these songs to the broader Jewish population, with the goal of developing a new, unified Zionist musical genre.

Idelsohn was later joined in Palestine by other classically trained musicians and ethnomusicologists, including Gershon Ephros in 1909 and Joel Engel in 1924. Like Idelsohn, Engel focused on collecting and promoting traditional ethnic melodies and musical styles, aiming to make them accessible to the broader Jewish population in Palestine.

The Second Aliyah, which took place from 1904 to 1914, was accompanied by an increase in the composition of original songs by Jewish settlers. Among the earliest composers of Jewish folk songs in Palestine were Hanina Karchevsky, known for BeShadmot Beit Lehem, and David Ma'aravi, known for Shirat HaNoar.

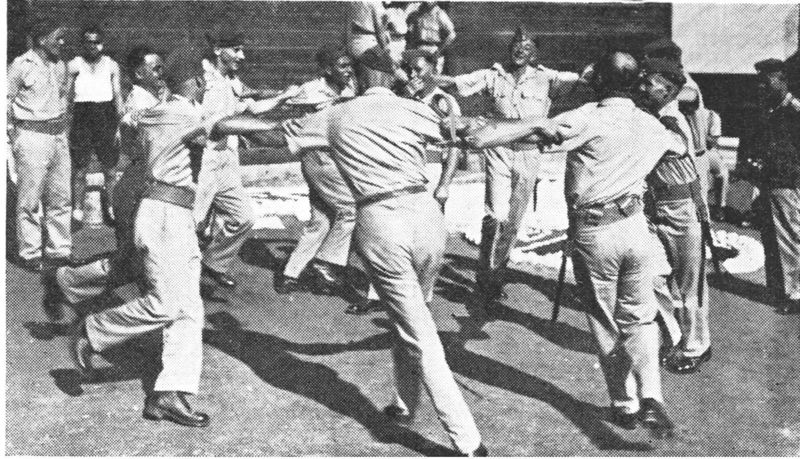
Jewish Brigade soldiers dancing the Hora

==== Musical cabarets ====
"Emet El ShimHa" sung by Shoshana Damari

Beginning in the 1920s, café and cabaret music gained popularity in Palestine. Prior to the establishment of the State of Israel, three prominent cabarets operated in Palestine: HaKumkum (The Kettle), HaMetate (The Broom), and Li-La-Lo. These venues presented variety shows that integrated political satire, theatrical performances, and music.

The cabarets served as launching platforms for the careers of several prominent figures in Israeli popular music. Shoshana Damari began performing as a teenager at Li-La-Lo. Yafa Yarkoni also started her career as a cabaret singer. Composers such as Nahum Nardi (Shtu HaAdarim, Kahol Yam HaMayim), Moshe Vilensky (BeKhol Zot Yesh Ba Mashehu, Hora Mamtera), and Daniel Sambursky (Shir HaEmek, Zemer HaPlugot), (Note: Song is from www.nostalgia.com) among others, composed songs that later became part of the canonical Israeli song repertoire. Many of the lyrics were written by poet Nathan Alterman.

The cabarets also contributed to the diversity of Israeli music by introducing a popular, light musical style that differed from the New Hebrew style and the Russian folk influences that were dominant at the time. Many of the cabaret songs were composed in major keys, featured upbeat rhythms, and incorporated elements from Latin genres such as tango and samba.

Following the establishment of the State of Israel in 1948, cabarets and musical revues continued to be a part of the country's cultural landscape.

==== Aliyah of musicians in the 1930s ====
By 1935, Jewish musicians across Europe were facing increasing persecution, including dismissal from positions, harassment, and expulsion due to the rise of Nazism. Several prominent figures in European classical music, including Ödön Pártos, Paul Ben-Haim, and Alexander Uriah Boskovich, immigrated to Palestine as part of the Fifth Aliyah.

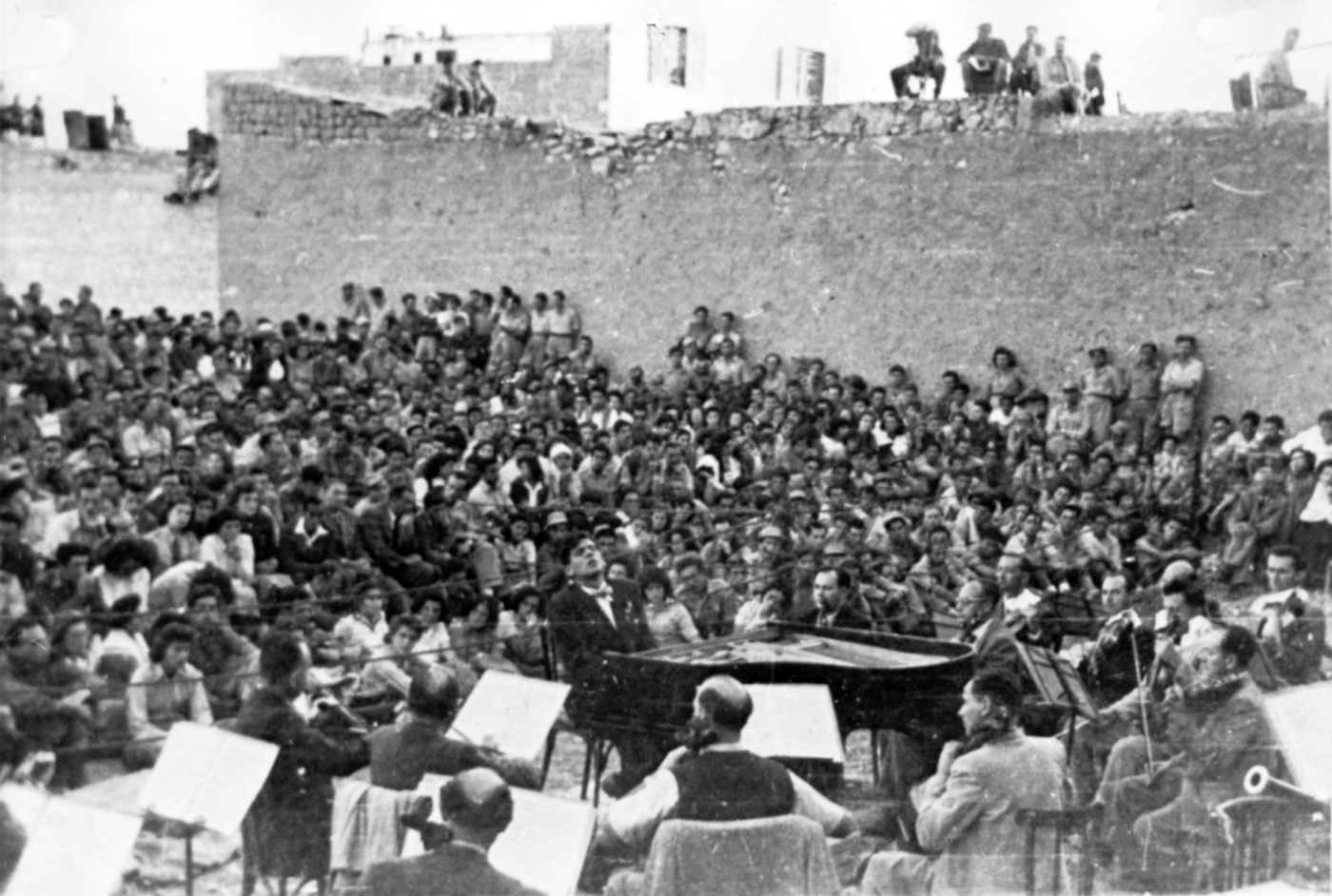
The Israel Philharmonic Orchestra performs in the desert town of Beersheba, 1948.

Concert violinist Bronislaw Huberman initiated the formation of a Jewish orchestra in Palestine and recruited musicians from some of Europe's leading orchestras. The Palestine Philharmonic Orchestra, which became the Israel Philharmonic Orchestra after the Israeli Declaration of Independence in 1948, gave its inaugural performance in December 1936. Since then, it has performed in concerts of historical importance. In 1967, following the Six-Day War, conductor Leonard Bernstein led the orchestra in a performance in the Sinai Peninsula. In the 1980s, the orchestra played near the Lebanese border to an audience that included both Israelis and Lebanese on either side of the border fence.

As writers of popular music pursued the New Hebrew Style, many classical composers explored new compositional approaches intended to reflect Zionist themes. In 1946, music critic David Rosolio opined that composing in Palestine required a shift from purely Western concepts, citing the local landscape, lifestyle, and environment as factors necessitating a different approach. In his Semitic Suite for piano (1945), Alexander Uriah Boskovich employed a homophonic texture with drone accompaniment and repeated notes, aiming to emulate the sound of traditional Middle Eastern instruments such as the oud and kanun. Similarly, Paul Ben-Haim's Sonata A Tre (1968), composed for harpsichord, mandolin, and guitar, features musical elements that reflect a distinctly Middle Eastern character.

=== 1967 as a turning point ===
The Six-Day War in 1967 marked a significant turning point in Israeli culture. According to writer Amos Elon, the war represented a shift in the national psyche, signaling a transition from adolescence to maturity. The post-war period was characterized by a notable increase in cultural activity. The number of art galleries rose by one-third, the number of theaters doubled, and a variety of restaurants, nightclubs, and discothèques also emerged.

During this period, the Israeli music scene became increasingly open to global influences. Rock music, which had previously attracted limited interest and received little airtime on state radio, began to gain popularity. Mizrahi music began to receive broader recognition and legitimacy. Israeli musicians performed abroad more frequently, and international artists from Europe and the United States visited Israel to perform.

As musical diversity expanded, many Israeli compositions began to reflect international trends rather than a specific national style. The earlier focus on establishing a unique national musical identity diminished. Rock musician Shalom Hanoch remarked in an interview, "I don't like the attempt to be ethnic very much... I don't search for roots [in my music], my roots are within me... I don't have to add oriental flavor for people to know that I am from the Middle East."

Despite this shift, many Israeli musicians in both popular and classical genres continued to engage with questions of national identity in their work.

=== Evolution of the music industry ===
Following the decline of the Israeli military ensembles in the 1970s, institutions of higher musical education became central in cultivating new musical talent in Israel. These included the country's two principal classical music academies, the Rubin Academy in Jerusalem and the Buchmann-Mehta School of Music in Tel Aviv, as well as two private institutions focused primarily on jazz and popular music: the Rimon School in Ramat Hasharon and the Hed School in Tel Aviv.

Between 1960 and 1980, Israeli radio and television promoted music through the Israel Song Festival. Success in these competitions was often a significant factor in establishing an artist's career during that period. Until the late 1980s, the Israeli government, primarily through its control of radio and television broadcasting, maintained a central role in influencing the musical preferences of the Israeli public. In 1965, a dispute between rival concert promoters contributed to a decision by conservatives within the Israeli government to withhold the allocation of foreign currency needed to bring the Beatles to perform in Israel. Some rock and Palestinian musicians claimed that radio and television broadcasters discriminated against their music, thus limiting the commercial success of these genres despite their growing popularity.

With the commercialization of Israeli radio and television in the 1990s, the influence of state-run media as the primary arbiters of musical taste diminished. In place of state-run media, recording companies, impresarios, and music venues gained increasing influence in discovering new talent and promoting musical careers, a model more characteristic of the European and American music industries.

== Palestinian and Arab influences ==
"HaPerach BeGani" sung by Zohar Argov

The earliest composers of Israeli Hebrew folk music were influenced by elements of local Palestinian musical traditions. Subsequent influences on Israeli music came from Jewish immigrants from Middle Eastern and North African countries, including Morocco, Yemen, Iraq, and Egypt. These communities introduced various Arab musical traditions, contributing to the development of Mizrahi music.

The distinctive blend of Eastern and Western musical elements characteristic of Mizrahi music has influenced the broader landscape of Israeli popular music. A notable example is the song HaPerach BeGani ("The Flower in My Garden"), performed by Zohar Argov, with lyrics by Avihu Medina and music by Medina and Moshe Ben Mosh. (Note: Music sample is taken from www.songs.co.il)

=== Contemporary Palestinian and Arab music ===
Palestinian citizens of Israel, who constitute over 20 percent of the country's population, have developed distinct musical styles. Until the early 1990s, little original music was produced by this community. Locally composed music began to gain traction among the Palestinian population in Israel during the 1980s. Prior to that, music performed at community gatherings typically consisted of repertoire originating from other Arabic-speaking countries.

Amal Murkus talks about her art

By the early 21st century, a number of prominent local musicians had emerged. These included internationally recognized oud and violin virtuoso Taiseer Elias, singer Amal Murkus, and the brothers Samir and Wissam Joubran. Several Israeli Arab and Palestinian artists have also achieved international success: Elias and Murkus frequently perform in Europe and North America, and oud player Darwish Darwish (one of Elias's students) won first prize at an all-Arab oud competition held in Egypt in 2003.

The experience of living as a minority in Israel has influenced the musical output of Palestinian musicians there. Their work often focuses on themes such as identity, conflict, memory, and aspirations for peace. For example, Kamilya Jubran's song "Ghareeba," based on a poem by Khalil Gibran, conveys a sense of isolation and longing experienced by a Palestinian woman.

"Ghareeba", by Kamilya Jubran

A Stranger – female
A stranger in this world..
A stranger..
In estrangement there is cruel loneliness
And painful desolation
But it makes me forever think
Of a magical home I know not

Several groups have emerged, such as Elias's Bustan Avraham, The Olive Leaves, and Shlomo Gronich's Israeli-Palestinian ensemble in which Jews and Palestinians perform together. Joint musical bands such as Zimrat Yah, Shams Tishrin, Blues Job, and Sahar, have appeared all over Israel, particularly in the Galilee.The Olive Leaves gave a successful concert tour in Jordan in 1995, with lead Jewish singer Shoham Eynav singing songs in both Hebrew and Arabic.

Palestinian citizens of Israel have branched out into many musical styles. Palestinian hip-hop artist Tamer Nafar, founder of the rap group DAM, became an independent rap star after a politically charged dispute with Israeli rapper Subliminal. His music expresses the frustration and alienation that many Palestinians citizens of Israel feel. The rock music of Basam Beromi, singer of the group "Khalas" (Enough!), protests against the strictures of traditional Arab society. The song "What have we come to?", for example, tells the story of a young girl in love, whose family murders her for violating strict traditional codes of courtship. London-trained guitarist Michel Sajrawy combines jazz, rock, and gypsy with classical Arab music.

Singalongs have gained momentum in Israeli Arab society, as people of all ages turn out for musical events in Nazareth, Jaffa, Haifa, Karmiel and other cities.

While music education for Palestinian citizens of Israel is less developed, there has been a steady growth of opportunities in this sector. The Jerusalem Academy of Music and Dance has an advanced degree program, headed by Taiseer Elias, in Arabic music. In 2007, the first precollege conservatory for the Arab-speaking population opened in Shfaram.

=== Mizrahi music ===
Immigrant communities in Israel from Arab countries have developed a blended musical style that incorporates elements of Turkish, Greek, Arabic, and Israeli music. In contrast to the New Hebrew Style, which was a deliberate creation of Eastern European immigrants seeking to shape a new Israeli identity, Mizrahi music (muzika mizrachit) emerged as a spontaneous, grassroots genre.

The muzika mizrachit movement began in the 1950s within Arab Jewish neighborhoods, particularly among Yemenite residents of Tel Aviv's Kerem HaTeimanim neighborhood, as well as Moroccan, Iranian, and Iraqi communities.

In the 1960s, the style began to evolve, incorporating acoustic and electric guitars to create a more eclectic sound. Vocal techniques commonly included melisma and other Arabic ornamental features, with a nasal or guttural tone quality. Despite these stylistic elements, the intonation typically adhered to Western scales, avoiding the quartertone systems characteristic of classical Arabic music.

Zohar Argov

Prominent performers from the 1970s and 1980s included Shimi Tavori, Zehava Ben, (Note: Sample of Zehava Ben's song "Pashut VeAmiti" taken from www.songs.co.il.) and Zohar Argov. Argov's song "HaPerah BeGani" ("The Flower in My Garden") became a major hit, and he came to be known as the "King of Muzika Mizrachit." His life story was later adapted into a film.

Despite its popularity, Mizrahi music was largely excluded from state radio broadcasts. According to social researcher Sami Shalom Chetrit, "The educational and cultural establishment made every effort to separate the second generation of eastern immigrants from this music, by intense socialization in schools and in the media."

The eventual integration of Mizrahi music into mainstream Israeli culture was influenced by the efforts of Mizrahi composers and producers such as Avihu Medina, the genre's widespread popularity, and the incorporation of Mizrahi musical elements by well-known Israeli artists. In 1989, singer Yardena Arazi released Dimion Mizrahi ("Mizrahi Imagination"), which featured a blend of original material and canonical Israeli songs. Other musicians began experimenting with fusion styles that combined Mizrahi music with Israeli, Greek, rock, and global musical influences. These included Yehuda Poliker and Shlomo Bar, whose group HaBrera HaTivit ("The Natural Choice" or "The Natural Selection") integrated instruments such as the sitar and tabla.

"Pashut VeAmiti (פשוט ואמיתי)" by Zehava Ben

The growing acceptance of Mizrahi music during the 1990s paralleled the broader social efforts of Arab Jews to attain cultural and societal recognition in Israel. Literary researcher and critic Mati Shmuelof noted in 2006 that "today, the popular Muzika Mizrachit has begun to erase the differences from rock music, and we can see not a few artists turning into mainstream... This move to the mainstream culture includes cultural assimilation."

Vocal techniques in Mizrahi music often feature Arab-style melismatic ornamentation (known in Hebrew as silsulim) and a nasal tone, characteristic of some Arab musical styles. Melodic structures are frequently modal, shifting between major and minor, with a guttural vocal delivery. While Arab music is traditionally homophonic and based on melodic frameworks called maqamat, Mizrahi music tends to include harmonic accompaniment and generally employs the Western 12-tone scale.

=== Jewish Yemenite music ===
"Shtu HaAdarim" sung by Esther Ofarim

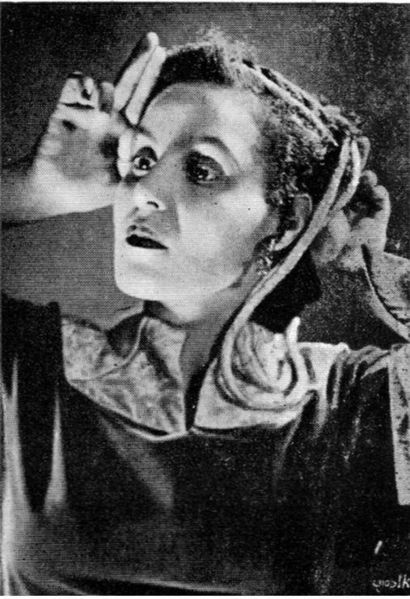
Yemenite singer Bracha Zefira

The music of Yemenite Jews played a significant role in the development of Israeli music, as it was regarded by early Zionist settlers to Palestine as a cultural connection to biblical traditions. Musicologist A.Z. Idelsohn noted that "the music of the ancient Hebrews is preserved in memory and practice in various Jewish centers... Yemen, in South Arabia, [is] a community that lived practically in seclusion for thirteen hundred years." Yemenite Jews began immigrating to Palestine in 1881 during the First Aliyah. Many European settlers who arrived during the Yishuv period expressed admiration for the Yemenite musical style. A number of early Zionist folk songs were adaptations or westernized versions of traditional Yemenite melodies. In the 1930s and 1940s, Yemenite singer Bracha Zefira collected and recorded a range of Yemenite songs and also performed original compositions influenced by the Yemenite style. One example is the song "Shtu HaAdarim" ("Drink, the Flock"), (Note: Song sample from www.songs.co.il) with lyrics by Alexander Penn and music by Nahum Nardi.

Following Operation Magic Carpet, Aharon Amram became one of the first artists to record Yemenite music using instruments not traditionally associated with the genre. His approach initially faced resistance from Israeli-Yemenite radio broadcasters, who typically viewed authentic Yemenite music as performed solely with simple percussion instruments, such as tin, and were reluctant to broadcast his recordings. Amram accompanied his traditional Yemenite singing with a variety of instruments, including guitar, violin, qanoun, trumpet, trombone, and various percussion instruments.

Yemenite music gained international recognition in the 1980s through the success of singer Ofra Haza, whose album Yemenite Songs achieved popularity among world music audiences. Haza was raised in a traditional Yemenite Jewish family and initially became known for her work in Israeli pop music. Later in her career, she came to be regarded as a cultural representative of Yemenite Jewish heritage. Several of her well-known songs, including Im Nin'alu, were adaptations of traditional Yemenite compositions, many of which were originally written by Rabbi Shalom Shabazi, a 17th-century poet and mystic widely respected in the Yemenite community. Shabazi's poetry addressed both religious and secular subjects, contributing to the broader thematic scope of Yemenite music in comparison to other forms of traditional Jewish music, which are often liturgical in nature.

=== Iraqi Jewish music ===
The Iraqi Jewish musicians who immigrated to Israel during the broader Jewish exodus from Arab and Muslim countries maintained their distinct musical traditions following their relocation. In the first half of the 20th century, nearly all professional instrumental musicians in Iraq were Jewish. Notable figures included composer and oud player Ezra Aharon, violinist Salih Al-Kuwaiti and his brother, oud player Dawud Al-Kuwaiti, composer Salim Al'Nur, and singer Salima Pasha. In Israel, the Israel Broadcasting Authority Arabic Orchestra played a role in preserving and promoting the Jewish-Iraqi musical heritage.

Although some of these musicians later found employment outside the music industry, they continued to perform within their communities. According to Suad Bazun, a singer and member of a prominent Iraqi Jewish musical family, descendants of these musicians have continued to engage with and perform traditional Iraqi music.

== European and other global influences ==
=== Russian folk music ===
"Shir Hamitpachat", sung by Arik Sinai

Many of the Zionist settlers who arrived in Palestine prior to World War II were from Russia and brought with them Russian folk melodies and musical styles. During the early period, songs were often contrafacta (existing Russian folk tunes set to new or translated Hebrew lyrics). One example is Shir HaMitpachat ("Song of the Kerchief"), based on a Polish song by Jerzy Petersburski (Niebieska chusteczka / Sinij Platochek, синий платочек), with Hebrew lyrics by poet and lyricist Nathan Alterman. (Note: Version of the song here is sung by Arik Sinai, from his album "Shirim Hozrim". Music sample published by www.Songs.co.il) These Russian-influenced songs were typically composed in a minor key and accompanied by instruments such as the accordion or guitar played in a style reminiscent of the balalaika.

=== Eastern European klezmer music ===
"Numi Numi" sung by Ahuva Tsadok

Klezmer music was introduced to Palestine by Jewish settlers from Eastern Europe during the Yishuv. Numerous Hasidic and klezmer melodies were incorporated into the emerging canon of Israeli folk music, often with lyrics translated from Yiddish or replaced with new Hebrew text. One example is Numi Numi ("Sleep My Child"), a song composed by Joel Engel based on a Hasidic lullaby, with lyrics by Yehiel Heilprin.

=== Greek, Latin American, Ethiopian and other influences ===
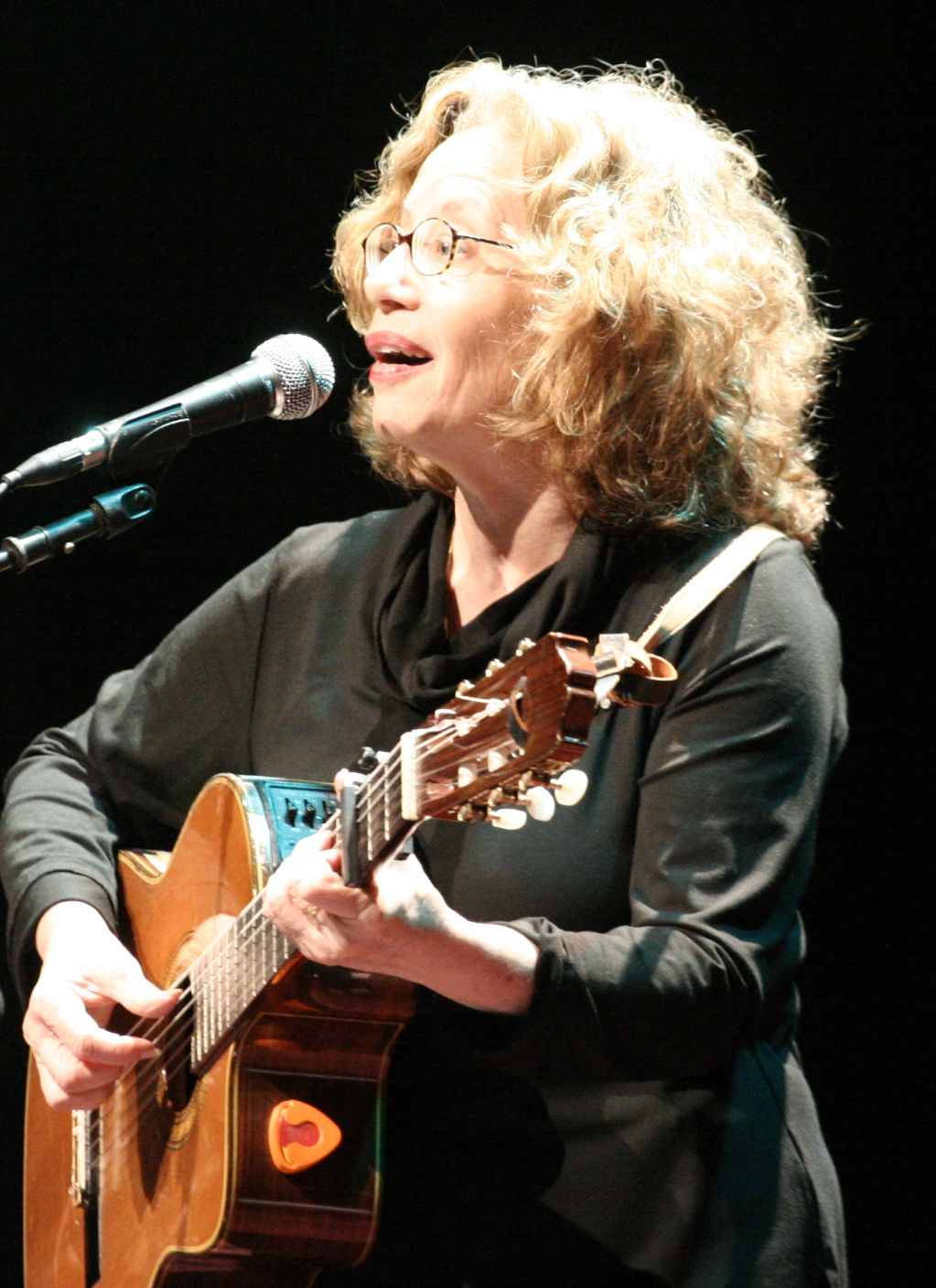
Israeli folk singer Chava Alberstein.

Greek-style bouzouki music gained increasing popularity in Israel during the early 1960s. Aris San, a non-Jewish Greek singer who immigrated to Israel and became a citizen, played a central role in promoting this musical style. One of Aris San's popular songs was "Sigal," with lyrics by Yovav Katz. San performed at the Zorba club in Jaffa, which was opened and owned by Shlomo Bachramov. He also composed songs for Israeli singer Aliza Azikri, including "Bahayim Hakol Over" and "Yesh Ahava Ata Omer." These works contributed to bridging the gap between mainstream Israeli music and the musical traditions of Greek and Arab-Jewish communities. Songs by Greek singer Stelios Kazantzidis have been translated into Hebrew. Yehuda Poliker, of Greek heritage, has incorporated the bouzouki in many of his songs.

In the late 1960s, several young Israeli musicians traveled to South America and were influenced by Latin rhythms and musical styles. These elements became prominent in Israeli popular music during the 1970s. An example of this influence is the song "Noah" by Matti Caspi and Shokolad, Menta, Mastik.

The American folk music movement of the 1960s and 1970s had an influence on the development of Israeli national musical style. Israeli folk singers including Chava Alberstein (Note: Song "Ayliluli" taken from website www.songs.co.il) adopted stylistic elements from American artists such as Judy Collins and Joni Mitchell. During the 1960s, Israeli guitar duos such as the Dudaim and the Parvarim performed both established Israeli songs and Hebrew-language adaptations of American and British folk songs.

During the 1970s, Israeli music experienced a period of growing eclecticism. Genres such as rock, jazz, and others began to take hold, reflecting broader global musical trends.

"Ayliluli" by Chava Alberstein

== Shirei Eretz Yisrael ==
=== Development ===
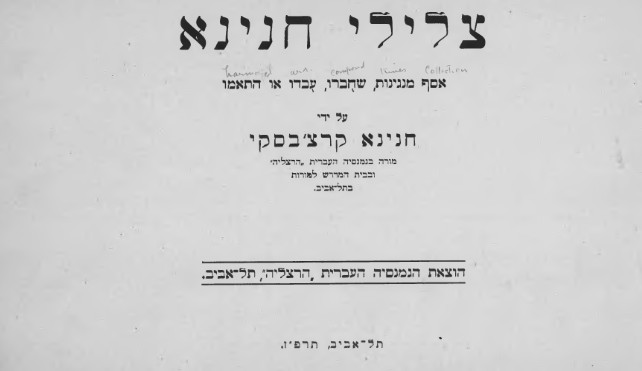
A book of Hebrew songs by Hanina Karchevsky, published 1927

By the 1920s, European Jewish composers in Palestine were developing distinct rhythmic and melodic forms to differentiate their work from traditional European music. This differentiation was part of a broader effort to move away from the traditions of the Jewish diaspora, which Zionists believed lacked vitality. The creation of a repertoire of Hebrew songs, accompanied by a distinctive musical style, was a priority for the Zionist movement. These songs and their associated genre became known as Shirei Eretz Yisrael ("Songs of the Land of Israel") or Zemer Ivri (Hebrew Song), and were primarily composed between the 1920s and the mid-1970s.

This musical development, along with concurrent developments in literature, theater, and graphic arts, reflected an effort to culturally root the Jewish population of Palestine in the heritage of the ancient Hebrews described in biblical texts. Shirei Eretz Yisrael comprises a body of modern Hebrew songs that became part of the national canon through their performance in specific social settings and inclusion in songbooks issued by major cultural institutions of the Yishuv.

The Zionist emphasis on creating a new Hebrew musical repertoire received institutional support. The Histadrut, a trade union organization that fulfilled numerous governmental functions for Jews in Palestine before the establishment of the State of Israel, created the Merkaz LeTarbut (Cultural Center), which published songbooks and provided financial assistance for Hebrew composers. Public singalongs were encouraged as part of the effort to develop a shared Hebrew identity. Kibbutz movements distributed songbooks and incorporated communal singing into daily routines. These singalongs also functioned as a method for teaching Hebrew to new immigrants.

State radio played a central role in promoting zemer ivri. Until 1990, all radio and television stations in Israel were state-owned and operated, serving as primary arbiters of cultural content in both pre-state Palestine and the State of Israel. These stations undertook initiatives to preserve the heritage of Israeli song and supported the creation and recording of music considered to be "authentic". According to Netiva Ben-Yehuda, young people often carried notebooks to write down the lyrics of songs they would sing with their friends.

=== Characteristics ===
"Shedemati", sung by Tsemed HaParvarim

Leaders of the musical movement associated with Shirei Eretz Yisrael included Matityahu Shelem, known for compositions such as VeDavid Yefe Eynaim and Shibbolet Basadeh, and Yedidia Admon, known for Shademati. (Note: Song sample taken from www.songs.co.il) These composers aimed to incorporate elements of Palestinian, Arabic, and other Middle Eastern musical traditions into their work. They employed simple harmonies and favored the natural minor scale instead of the melodic and harmonic minor scales commonly used in European music. They also avoided the augmented second interval, a characteristic of the Hungarian minor scale often found in klezmer music. In 1943, music critic and composer Menashe Ravina criticized this interval as "depressing" and overly sentimental.

Some musicians, including Marc Lavry (composer of Shir Ha-Emek and Kitatenu Balayla Tzoedet) produced works in both the New Hebrew musical style and the European classical tradition in which they had been trained. Lavry's song Zemer reflects the Hebrew style, while his opera Dan HaShomer follows European classical conventions. Other composers, such as Mordechai Zeira (known for Hayu Leylot, Layla Layla, and Shney Shoshanim) expressed regret for not adopting the new style. Zeira referred to his continued use of European idioms as "the Russian disease".

"Moshe" sung by Yaffa Yarkoni

Zemer ivri are characterized by several musical features. A prominent trait is the frequent use of minor keys; most canonical songs in this genre are composed in minor. Songs influenced by Russian or klezmer traditions often utilize the harmonic minor scale, marked by a raised seventh degree. In contrast, songs composed in the New Hebrew style typically use the natural minor scale, occasionally incorporating a diminished second leading to the tonic. Some compositions are modal or semimodal, sometimes resolving on the dominant rather than the tonic. An example of this is Moshe by Emmanuel Zamir, performed by Yaffa Yarkoni. (Note: Available in mp3 format here.)

"At Adama" sung by Ran Eliran

The style also incorporates various traditional dance rhythms, such as hora, Temani, and Atari, which often feature strong offbeats and asymmetric meters. These rhythms are commonly used to accompany Israeli folk dances. A notable example of a debka rhythm is found in At Adama, (Note: Available in mp3 format here.) based on a Bedouin melody and performed by Ran Eliran.

"Anu Nihiyeh HaRishonim" sung by IDF Choir

Middle Eastern percussion instruments such as the darbuka and tambourine are frequently used in the instrumentation. Militaristic themes are common in Israeli songwriting, though few songs are traditional marching tunes. Many focus on emotional experiences related to war. Additional lyrical themes include settler colonialism, a romanticized connection to nature, and biblical references. An example of a settler colonial-style marching song is Anu Nihiyeh HaRishonim ("We Will Be the First"), (Note: Available in mp3 format here.) with lyrics by Yosef Haftman set to a traditional melody.

"Ein Adir K'Adonai" sung by Bracha Zefira

Vocal style also plays a role in the genre's identity. Israeli singers, particularly those of Yemenite origin or those performing in styles influenced by Arab music, often use a guttural, throaty enunciation. This vocal quality can be heard in Ein Adir KeAdonai ("There Is None So Great as God"), (Note: Available in mp3 format here.) a traditional liturgical melody sung by Bracha Zefira.

=== Music and the military ===
The Israel Defense Forces (IDF) have been a significant influence on the development of Israeli music and culture.

As a result of decades of conflict with the Palestinians and neighboring Arab countries, themes of war and peace have become central to Israeli music. From the pre-state period to the present, many songs address topics such as war, sacrifice, loss, heroism, and the aspiration for peace. These songs are often melancholic in tone. One notable example is Eliphelet, with lyrics by Natan Alterman and music by Sasha Argov. Set to a hesitant melody in a minor key, the song recounts the story of a young man described as lacking in character who dies in combat due to a thoughtless mistake. (Note: Music sample taken from www.Songs.co.il)

"Eliphelet" sung by one of the lehakot tsva'iyot

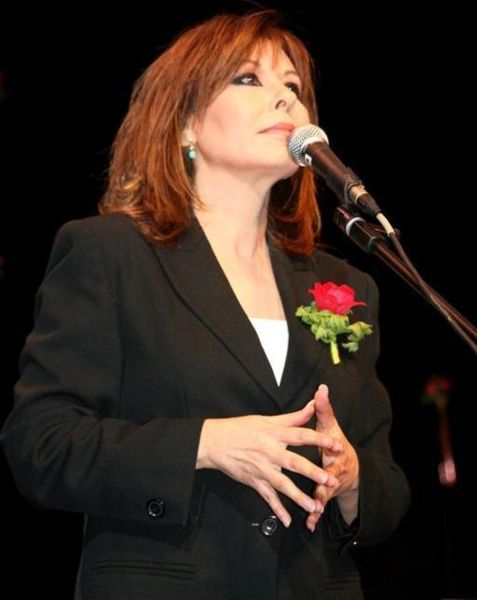
Singer Yardena Arazi, who started her career in the Lehakot Tsva'iyot.

The IDF has actively promoted music through its performance ensembles and its army-operated radio station, Galei Tzahal. Galei Tzahal has played a significant role in the dissemination and support of Israeli music since it began broadcasting in 1950.

Since the 1950s, the IDF has operated musical groups known as Lehakot Tzva'iyot, composed of enlisted soldiers selected for their musical or performance abilities. These ensembles perform for troops at military bases and field locations across the country.

The ensembles became prominent contributors to Israeli music and entertainment, performing original material that was carefully composed and arranged. Many well-known Israeli songs originated from the Lehakot Tzva'iyot, including "Dina Barzilai" (lyrics by Haim Hefer, music by Sasha Argov), "Hallelujah" (lyrics and music by Yair Rosenblum), and "Yeshnan Banot" (lyrics by Yoram Tahar-Lev, music by Yair Rosenblum). Composer Dov Seltzer, one of the early figures in Israeli popular music, wrote numerous songs for Lehakat HaNahal.

The Lehakot Tzva'iyot served as a training ground for many performers and composers who later became prominent figures in Israeli music. Artists who began their careers in the military ensembles include Arik Einstein, Chava Alberstein, members of the band Kaveret, Yehoram Gaon, (Note: Music sample of Yehoram Gaon's song "Nehederet" is extracted from the playback on Gaon's personal website, www.yehoramgaon.com.) Nechama Hendel, Yisrael Borochov, Yardena Arazi, Shlomo Artzi, Etti Ankri, and David D'Or. Composers and lyricists who gained recognition through their work with the Lehakot include Naomi Shemer, Yohanan Zarai, Yoni Rechter, Nurit Hirsh, and Yair Rosenblum.

"Nehederet" sung by Yehoram Gaon

The music produced by the military ensembles and broadcast by Galei Tzahal was generally not specifically military in nature; most of the songs were of a general character. However, the IDF regarded music as a valuable tool for public messaging and occasionally sponsored the creation of songs on topics it considered significant. For instance, lyricist Haim Hefer was invited to spend a week with the elite commando unit Haruv and to compose a song based on that experience. The resulting song was "Yesh Li Ahuv BeSayeret Haruv" ("I Have a Lover in the Haruv Commando Unit"), with music by Yair Rosenblum.

Beginning in 1967, the productions of the Lehakot Tzva'iyot became significantly more elaborate, and these ensembles played a prominent role in shaping Israeli music until the Yom Kippur War in 1973. In 1978, Chief of the General Staff General Rafael Eitan issued an order to disband the Lehakot Tzva'iyot and designated the Israel Defense Forces Orchestra as the sole musical unit for official ceremonies. The ensembles would reform in the 1980s, though their prominence declined by the end of the decade.

=== Evolution ===
The group From Israel with Love, conducted international tours during the 1970s, performing for sold-out audiences across the United States and planning additional performances in Europe. The 1972 ensemble was disbanded earlier than scheduled following the Munich massacre during the 1972 Summer Olympics.

Alongside the development of Israeli rock music in the 1960s, the folk music tradition continued to maintain a presence within the broader Israeli musical landscape. Singers such as Chava Alberstein, Yehoram Gaon, and Naomi Shemer continued to write and perform in the zemer ivri style. Naomi Shemer's repertoire included notable songs such as "Jerusalem of Gold", "Hoy Artzi Moladeti" ("Oh My Land, My Homeland," lyrics by Shaul Tchernichovsky), and "Horshat HaEkaliptus" ("The Eucalyptus Grove"). A significant portion of her success, including the popularity of "Yerushalayim Shel Zahav," was supported by the Israel Song Contest.

"LaKahat et Yadi BeYadeh", by Yoni Rechter, sung by Yehudit Ravitz

Bridging the parallel developments of Israeli rock and the continuation of the zemer ivri tradition was a group of musicians who aimed to create a distinctive Israeli style that incorporated elements of emerging rock music. Among these artists were Yehudit Ravitz, Yoni Rechter, Shlomo Gronich, Matti Caspi, Gidi Gov, and Danny Sanderson. Their progressive rock style often drew on the lyrical ballad tradition of the established Israeli repertoire, blending traditional instruments such as flute, recorder, darbuka, and acoustic guitar with electric guitars, drum kits, and synthesizers.

Unlike conventional hard rock, which typically relies on repetitive rhythms in common time and straightforward harmonic structures, the music of these artists frequently featured rhythmic and harmonic complexity. For example, Matti Caspi's song "Noah" incorporates a Latin musical style, characterized by jazz-influenced offbeats, chromatic harmonies, and lyrics referencing the biblical story of Noah.

Artists have continued to blend elements of rock and pop with the zemer ivri style. These include performers such as Rita, Noa, Aviv Geffen, Dana Berger, Eviatar Banai, Harel Skaat, Ninet Tayeb, Shiri Maimon, Dana International, Sharon Haziz, Mika Karni, Roni Duani, David D'Or, and the group Metropolin. Many of these artists incorporate electronic and dance music influences into their work.

== Popular genres ==
=== Israeli rock ===
Since the late 1960s, rock music has become a significant component of the Israeli music scene.

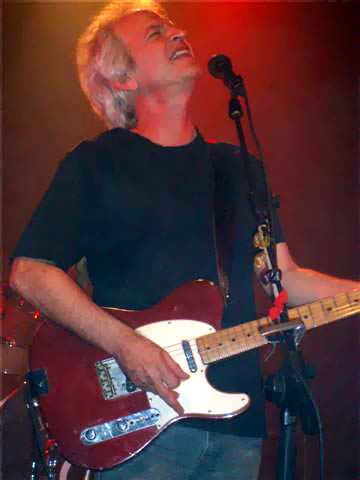
Rock singer Shalom Hanoch

Several artists played key roles in shaping Israeli rock, including The High Windows, The Churchills, Arik Einstein, Svika Pick, Shalom Hanoch, (Note: Medley of songs from the album "Shablul" by Arik Einstein and Shalom Hanoch is from www.songs.co.il) Miki Gavrielov, and the band Kaveret. The band Tamouz, featuring Shalom Hanoch and Ariel Zilber, released Sof Onat Hatapuzim ("The End of the Orange Season"), an album widely regarded as a milestone in Israeli rock, in the mid-1970s.

Israeli rock integrated Western pop and rock elements with Israeli folk traditions and musical styles from Arab Jewish communities, particularly Yemenite, Greek, and Andalusian-Moroccan influences. These fusions contributed to the distinct characteristics of contemporary Israeli music. By the late 1970s and 1980s, artists such as David Broza introduced additional influences, including flamenco.

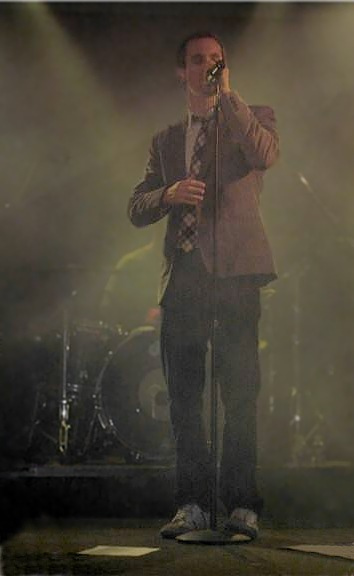
Ivri Lider

In contrast to the American rock movement, Israeli rock during the 1960s and 1970s typically avoided themes of social rebellion. Prior to the 1980s, topics such as drug use, sexuality, or alienation were rarely addressed. One notable exception is Arik Einstein's song "Shuv Lo Shaket" ("Not Quiet Again"). The leading figures of Israeli rock during this period, apart from artists like Shalom Hanoch and Svika Pick, were generally portrayed as clean-cut individuals with military service backgrounds and conforming to mainstream societal norms.

Medley of songs from rock album "Shablul", by Arik Einstein and Shalom Hanoch

A significant shift occurred in the 1990s with the emergence of Aviv Geffen. Beginning his career at the age of 18, Geffen was noted for his provocative stage presence, which included performing in drag and wearing heavy makeup. He openly discussed his decision not to serve in the military and incorporated themes such as drug use, sexuality, and youthful alienation into his music. Influenced by punk rock as well as bands like the Beatles and Pink Floyd, Geffen marked a departure from previous norms in Israeli rock. Despite initial controversy, his music resonated with a younger audience, and he remains one of Israel's best-selling artists.

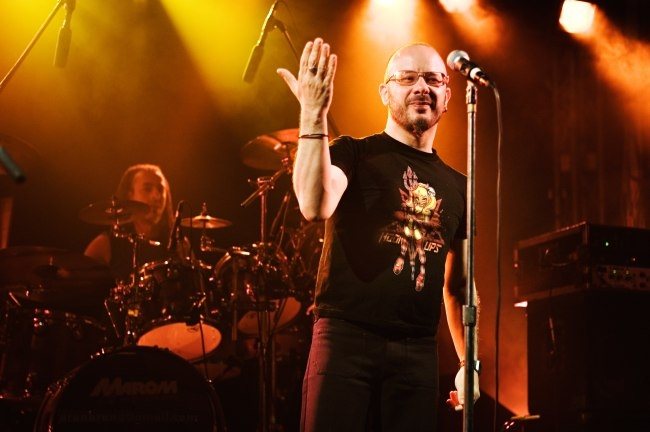
Kobi Oz of Teapacks

=== Israeli pop and dance music ===
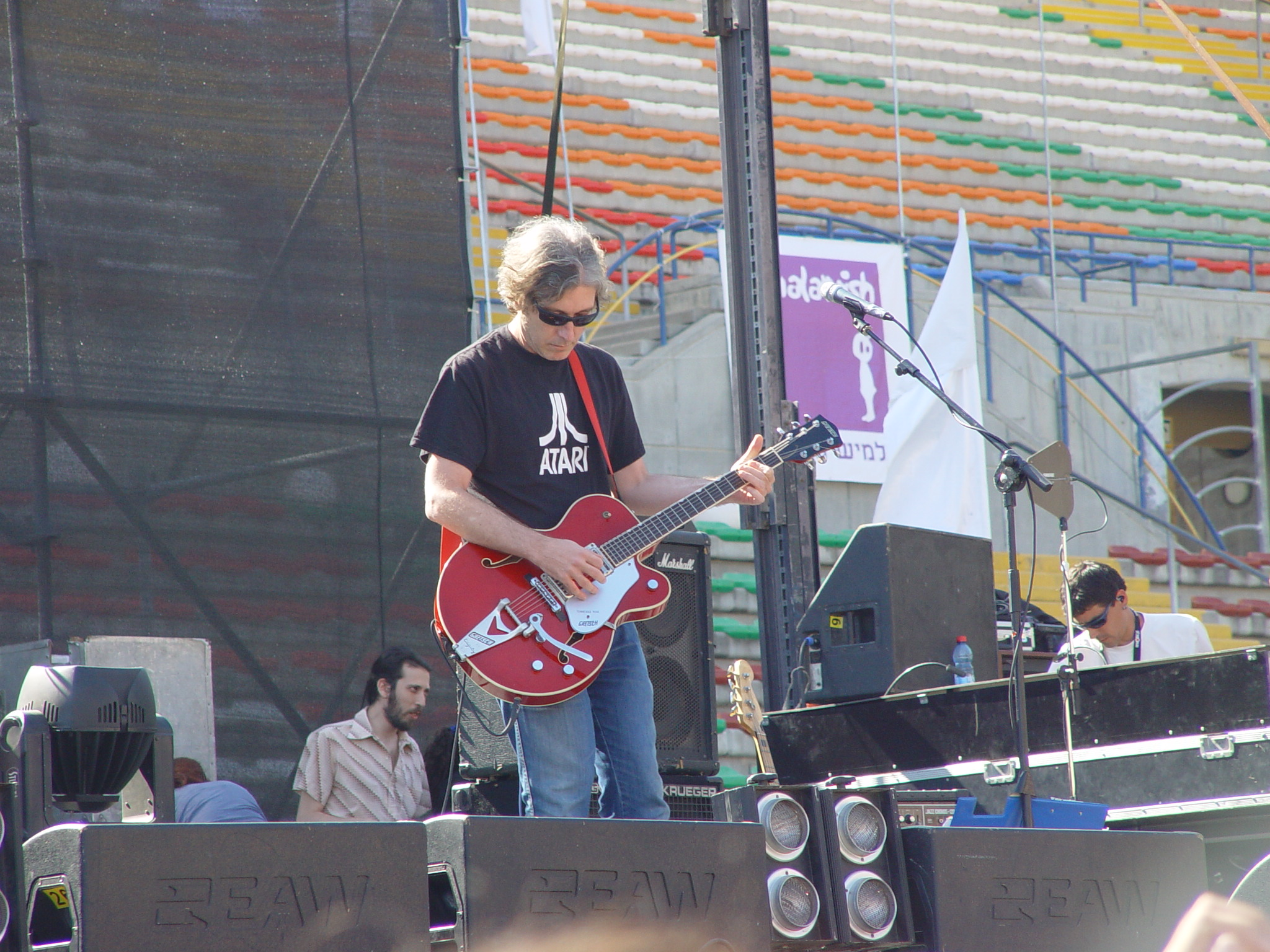
Rock musician Berry Sakharof.

Since the 1970s, the number of Israeli musical groups has grown substantially. Notable performers have included Berry Sakharof, (Note: Sample of song "Raash Lavan" taken from www.songs.co.il) Rami Fortis, and groups such as Eifo HaYeled, Ethnix, Teapacks, T-Slam, Mashina, Zikney Tzfat, Rockfour, HaMakhshefot ("The Witches"), Mofa Ha'arnavot Shel Dr. Kasper, Monica Sex, and Shimron Elit (20:20).

Prominent figures in Israeli pop music include Allon Olearchik, Shlomo Gronich, Etti Ankri, David D'Or, Aviv Geffen, Rita, HaYehudim, Ivri Lider, and Dana International. Other notable acts include Ninet Tayeb, Harel Skaat, and Shiri Maimon, all of whom gained recognition through the television talent show Kokhav Nolad. Netta Barzilai won the Eurovision Song Contest 2018.

=== Jazz ===
In 2012 and 2013, the American Society of Composers, Authors and Publishers named Israeli musician Uri Gurvich as the best up-and-coming jazz composer.

=== Israeli world music ===
Yisrael Borochov is active in the fields of world music and Middle Eastern music in Israel, incorporating Arabic and Bedouin influences into his work. He also operates the East West House in Jaffa, a venue where emerging musicians perform a variety of ethnic and esoteric musical styles. The Idan Raichel Project, a pop and ethnic fusion group formed in the 2000s, combines elements of Ethiopian, European, and Middle Eastern music performed in multiple languages,

=== Psychedelic trance, electronic and house music ===
"Raash Lavan" by Berry Sakharof

Psychedelic trance is popular in Israel, with several Israeli artists achieving international recognition in subgenres such as Goa trance and nitzhonot. Notable artists include Alien Project, Astrix, Astral Projection, Maor Levi, Vini Vici, Zafrir, and Infected Mushroom. In the field of house music, Offer Nissim is regarded as one of Israel's most internationally recognized contemporary producers.

=== Rap and hip hop ===
Israel has developed its own brand of rap and hip hop with groups such as Hadag Nahash, Subliminal, Sagol 59 and Kele 6 performing Israeli hip hop.

=== Heavy metal ===
Israel has a small but active underground metal scene, as documented in the film Global Metal. While some forms of heavy metal in Israel have faced criticism and been perceived as controversial or associated with satanic themes, bands such as Salem and Melechesh have gained recognition within the international extreme metal community.

=== Classical music ===
Classical composers in Israel have continued to explore and develop a distinctive Israeli identity in art music. Many have drawn on explicitly Jewish or Middle Eastern materials in their compositions. Leon Schidlowsky composed works inspired by Jewish themes, including the Holocaust, while also incorporating elements of his Latin American heritage.

Betty Olivero integrates melodies and modal structures from her Sephardic Jewish background into her music. An example is Achot Ketana, which is based on a 13th-century Sephardic prayer and includes a quotation from a Bach chaconne.

Tsippi Fleischer sets classical texts in languages such as Arabic and Ugaritic to contemporary musical settings, employing features of Arabic music, including the use of maqamat and microtonal intonation, alongside traditional and modern instrumentation. Her composition The Goddess Anath, based on Ugaritic texts, is scored for woman's voice, violin, piano, percussion, and dancer.

André Hajdu, an immigrant from Hungary, arranged Hasidic melodies for jazz ensembles. Mark Kopytman, who immigrated from Russia, composed symphonic and chamber works centered on Jewish themes.

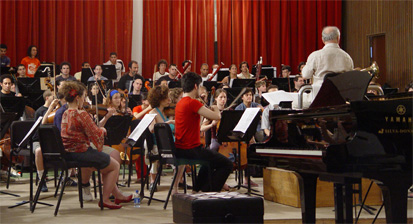
Daniel Barenboim conducting the West-Eastern Divan Orchestra, a project bringing together Israeli and Arab musicians.

Other Israeli composers who have incorporated Jewish and Israeli elements into their work have included Noam Sheriff, Ami Maayani, Yehezkel Braun, Tzvi Avni, Yitzhak Yedid, Lior Navok, and Gilad Hochman.

In addition to the Israel Philharmonic Orchestra, several other orchestras in Israel have achieved recognition, such as the Jerusalem Symphony Orchestra (supported by the state broadcasting authority), the Rishon LeZion Orchestra, and the Israel Camerata Jerusalem. One of the key motivations for the establishment and support of these orchestras was to provide employment for highly trained Russian immigrant musicians who arrived in Israel in large numbers.

The New Israeli Opera, founded in 1985, marked the first successful effort to establish a permanent repertory opera company in the country, following several unsuccessful attempts dating back to the 1940s. In 1995, the company moved into its permanent venue at the Golda Center in Tel Aviv.

Israel has also produced internationally recognized performers and conductors. Notable figures include pianist and conductor Daniel Barenboim, conductor Eliahu Inbal, and a number of distinguished violinists such as Itzhak Perlman, Pinchas Zukerman, Gil Shaham, Ivry Gitlis, Gil Shohat and Shlomo Mintz.

The Jerusalem Quartet is a string quartet that has achieved international acclaim. Other leading chamber groups include the Jerusalem Trio, the Tel Aviv Soloists, the Carmel Quartet, and the Aviv Quartet.

=== Hassidic and Orthodox Jewish music ===
Orthodox Jewish communities in Israel and the United States have developed a musical style known as Hasidic rock. This genre combines the instrumentation, sonorities, and rhythms of rock music with melodies influenced by klezmer traditions and lyrics drawn primarily from religious texts. Hasidic rock is produced, performed, and distributed largely within the religious community and remains separate from secular Israeli music. It is typically not played on secular radio stations or at secular public events.

One of the early figures associated with the development of Hasidic rock was Shlomo Carlebach. In Israel, notable Hasidic rock performers include the group Reva L'Sheva and singers Adi Ran and Naftali Abramson. Due to halakhic restrictions on women singing before mixed-gender audiences, women do not participate in Hasidic rock performances, and concerts are typically gender-segregated.

The genre has been widely embraced by segments of the religious Zionist community, including groups such as Gush Emunim. However, it has also encountered resistance within parts of the Haredi community. As music critic Kobi Sela has noted, some Haredi rabbis object to the expressive style of the genre, particularly when performers vocally emphasize religious themes in a manner perceived as untraditional.

In recent years, religious singer-songwriter Ishay Ribo has gained popularity among both religious and secular audiences.

=== Yiddish and Ladino music ===
"Lemele", traditional Yiddish song, sung by Chava Alberstein

Several private language institutes and universities in Israel offer programs in Yiddish and Ladino, two languages that were widely spoken among Jewish communities in the Diaspora prior to the Holocaust. A Yiddish theater group, YiddishShpiel, based in Tel Aviv, stages musical performances in Yiddish. Some Israeli artists have recorded music in these languages, including a Ladino album by Yehoram Gaon and Yiddish albums by Chava Alberstein. (Note: "Shirei Am BeYiddish" (1977), produced by NMC. Song sample is from www.songs.co.il)

Anthologies of Yiddish songs have also been produced, including a seven-volume collection edited by Sinai Leichter and published by the Hebrew University of Jerusalem.

=== Music of migrant workers ===
In 2006, there were an estimated 165,000 migrant workers in Israel. These workers originated from countries including the Philippines, Thailand, India, China, various African nations, Eastern Europe, and other regions. Each migrant community maintains its own musical traditions. Some migrant communities also form local popular music groups that perform at social events and on holidays.

== Music education ==
Israel provides a wide range of opportunities for music education, spanning early childhood through adulthood. Music education in the country receives government support, a practice that originated during the Yishuv period in Palestine, when music was used as a means of teaching Hebrew to Jewish colonizers.

The Israel Ministry of Education supports 41 music conservatories throughout the country. One of the prominent institutions is the Stricker Conservatory in Tel Aviv, which, in addition to providing lessons and courses, hosts concert series and master classes by visiting artists.

Several institutions of higher education in Israel offer academic degrees in music and musicology. In addition to the two music academies located in Tel Aviv and Jerusalem, Tel Aviv University and the Hebrew University of Jerusalem provide advanced degrees in musicology. The Hebrew University also houses the Jewish Music Research Center. Bar-Ilan University offers undergraduate and graduate degrees in musicology, as well as a program in music therapy. In 2007, its Safed College launched a three-year program in ethnic music that includes Klezmer, Hasidic, Western, and Eastern music traditions. Levinsky College offers a teaching certificate and bachelor's degree in music education.

The Rimon School of Jazz and Contemporary Music, established in 1985, is Israel's only institution dedicated to jazz, R&B, bebop, rock, and pop music

Beyond formal degree programs, Israel offers various opportunities for adult musicians to continue their engagement with music. Two organizations support amateur chamber music players: the Israel Chamber Music Club for string players and Yanshuf for wind players. Additionally, there are over 20 community orchestras throughout the country for amateur musicians.

== Music and politics ==
Music has been associated with various political movements in Israel. Supporters of Gush Emunim, a far-right religious Zionist movement aligned with the ideology of Greater Israel, adopted traditional religious songs and attributed political significance to them. One such example is the song "Utsu Etsu VeTufar" ("They gave counsel but their counsel was violated"), which has been interpreted by some within the movement as symbolizing the perceived righteousness of their cause, particularly in relation to the support for Israeli settlements.

Israel annexed East Jerusalem from Jordan during the Six-Day War in 1967. Shortly before the war, songwriter Naomi Shemer composed "Jerusalem of Gold", which was performed by Shuli Natan. (Note: Song sample, sung by Shuli Natan, taken from www.songs.co.il) The song, along with others by Shemer, has become associated with support of Israeli settlements. Following the Cave of the Patriarchs massacre in 1994, members of the Kach movement adopted the song "Barukh HaGever", which is commonly played at Jewish weddings and is accompanied by a line dance. The song was used to express admiration for Baruch Goldstein, the perpetrator of the massacre.

Minutes before the assassination of Prime Minister Yitzhak Rabin at a political rally in 1995, Israeli folk singer Miri Aloni performed Shir LaShalom ("Song for Peace"). Originally written in 1969 and widely performed by the Lehakot Tzvayiot, the song later became associated with the Israeli peace movement.

During the First Intifada, Israeli singer Si Heyman performed Yorim VeBokhim ("Shoot and Weep") as a protest against Israeli policies in Palestine. The song was briefly banned by state-run radio but subsequently gained popularity.

Protest songs by right-wing artists also emerged during and after the Oslo Accords and the Israeli disengagement from the Gaza Strip. Musicians such as Ariel Zilber, Shalom Flisser, Aharon Razel, Eli Bar-Yahalom, Yuri Lipmanovich, and Ari Ben-Yami performed songs expressing Zionist themes and opposition to the peace process.

== See also ==
- Biblical music
- Hatikvah
- Jewish music
- Israel Philharmonic Orchestra Foundation
- List of Israeli musical artists
- List of Jewish musicians
- List of music festivals in Israel
- List of songs about Jerusalem
- Greek music in Israel
- Society of Authors, Composers and Music Publishers in Israel
- Israel in the Eurovision Song Contest
- Kokhav Nolad

=== Notable musicians ===
- Etti Ankri
- Keren Ann
- Mike Brant
- Daliah Lavi
- Hadag Nahash
- Hedva and David
- David Broza
- David Serero
- David D'Or
- Dana International
- Ishtar
- Yael Naïm
- Achinoam Nini
- Gene Simmons
- Asaf Avidan
- Netta Barzilai
- Dennis Lloyd
- Lola Marsh
- Infected Mushroom
- Vini Vici
- Astrix
- Minimal Compact
- Orphaned Land
- Avishai Cohen
- Borgore
- Hanan Ben Ari

== Bibliography ==
- Badley, Bill and Zein al Jundi (2000) "Europe Meets Asia" In Broughton, Simon and Ellingham, Mark with McConnachie, James and Duane, Orla (Ed.), World Music, Vol. 1: Africa, Europe and the Middle East, pp 391–395. Rough Guides Ltd, Penguin Books. ISBN 978-1-85828-636-5
- Ben Zeev, Noam, "Music from Two Worlds" (June 26, 2007), in Haaretz. Retrieved July 19, 2010.
- Ben Zeev, Noam, "Namal Musikali BeShefaram" (April 29, 2007), in Haaretz.
- Brinner, Benjamin (2009) "Playing Across A Divide: Israeli-Palestinian Musical Collaborations" (New York: Oxford University Press)
- Bin Nun, Sagi, "Kiss the Fat Woman Goodbye" (October 26, 2004), in Haaretz. Retrieved July 19, 2010.
- Bohlman, P.V. (1988) The Study of Folk Music in the Modern World (Indiana University Press).
- Blacking, John (1995) Music, Culture, and Experience (Chicago). ISBN 978-0-226-08829-7
- Chetrit, Sami Shalom (2004) HaMaavak HaMizrahi BeYisrael 1948–2003 (Tel Aviv: Ofakim).
- Dvori, Moshe (2006) "עמארה – עיר בין הדקלים" ("Amara: Ir Ben HaDekalim"; "Amara: City Among the Date Palms") (Tel Aviv: Ahital). Retrieved July 19, 2010.
- Edel, Itzhak (1946) "HaShir HaEretz-Yisraeli" ("The Songs of the Land of Israel) (Tel Aviv: Monograph published by Merkaz HaTarbut, Histadrut).
- Eliram, Talila, (1995) Shirei Eretz Israel (Songs of the Land of Israel) – the Creations and Meaning of a Popular Music Repertoire at the End of the 20th Century (Bar Ilan University, Thesis for MA).
- Elon, Amos (1971) The Israelis: Founders and Sons (Great Britain: Weidenfeld and Nicolson).
- Fleisher, Robert Twenty Israeli Composers (Detroit: Wayne State University Press, 1997).
- Gluzman, D. (1987) Ehad BaPe veEhad BaTslil ("One by Word and One by Tune") (Tel Aviv University, Thesis for MA).
- Hacohen, Eliahu (1998) Introduction to Layla Layla: The Songs of Mordechai Zeira, edited by Gil Aldema (Tel Aviv).
- Heskes, Irene (1994) Passport to Jewish Music (New York: Tara Publications). ISBN 978-0-313-28035-1
- Heyman, Nahum (2007) radio interview on Galei Tsahal, 25 May.
- Hirshberg, Jehoash (1995) Music in the Jewish Community of Palestine 1880–1948 (Oxford: Oxford University Press). ISBN 978-0-19-816651-1
- Idelsohn, A.Z. (1948) Jewish Music in its Historical Development (New York: Tudor Publishing).
- Israel Central Bureau of Statistics (2010), הירחון הסטטיסטי (Monthly Bulletin of Statistics) No. 6 / 2010. Retrieved July 19, 2010.
- Israeli Ministry of Foreign Affairs, Cultural and Scientific Affairs Division, "Extending the Olive Branch" (September 1995), Panim: Faces of Art and Culture in Israel. Retrieved July 19, 2010.
- Kinneret Publishing, 1000 Zemer VeOd Zemer (in three volumes) (Tel Aviv: 1981).
- Lynskey, Dorian "The Great Divide" (March 11, 2005) from The Guardian, London. Retrieved July 19, 2010.
- Kojaman, Yeheskel (1999) "Jewish Role in Iraqi Music" in The Scribe: Journal of Babylonian Jewry (Tel Aviv: The Exilarch Society), Volume 72, p 42. Retrieved July 19, 2010.
- Manasseh, Sara (2004) "An Iraqi samai of Salim Al-Nur" in Research Centre for Cross-Cultural Music and Dance Performance (London: Arts and Humanities Research Board), Newsletter 3, pp 7–8. Retrieved July 19, 2010.
- Pasternak, Velvel compiler, editor and arranger, Israel in Song. Tara Publications,1974. ISBN 9780933676978.
- Ravina, Menashe (1943), "Hashirim LeAm BeEretz Yisrael" (Tel Aviv: Monograph published by Mossad LeMusica Ltd.)
- Regev Motti (1993), Oud and Guitar: The Musical Culture of the Arabs in Israel (Institute for Israeli Arab Studies, Beit Berl), ISBN 978-965-454-002-5.
- Regev, Motti and Seroussi, Edwin (2004) Popular Music and National Culture in Israel (Berkeley: University of California Press). ISBN 978-0-520-23652-3
- Reuters, "Factbox: Migrant Workers in Israel" (March 11, 2007). Retrieved July 19, 2010.
- Rosolio, David (1946), Review of the Semitic Suite by Alexander Uriah Boskovich, Ha'aretz, March 1.
- Sela, Kobi (2007) "Hassidic Rock Around the Clock", Haaretz, March 5.
- Seter, Ronit (2014). "Israelism: Nationalism, Orientalism, and the Israeli Five". Musical Quarterly 97.2 (2014): 238–308. https://doi.org/10.1093/musqtl/gdu010
- Seter, Ronit (2019). "Israeli Art Music". In Oxford Bibliographies Online. https://www.oxfordbibliographies.com/view/document/obo-9780199757824/obo-9780199757824-0264.xml (accessed 23 Sep. 2023)
- Shahar, Natan (1999) "HaShir HaEretz-Yisraeli – Hithavuto, Tsmihato, VeHitPathuto BeShanim 1882–1948" in Zohar Shavit (editor), Bniata Shel Tarbut Ivrit BeEretz Yisrael
- Shmuelof, Mati (2006) "Reflections on Muzika Mizrahit"
- Solomon, Naomi, "HaBesora Al Pi Tel Aviv", (December 29, 2006) in Tel Aviv Magazine.
- Tahar-Lev, Yoram and Naor, Mordecai (1992) Shiru Habitu Ur'u – The Stories Behind the Songs (Tel Aviv: Ministry of Defence). ISBN 978-965-05-0656-8
- Toeplitz, Uri Sippura Shel HaTizmoret HaPhilharmonit HaYisraelit (Tel Aviv: Sifriat HaPoalim, 1992) – history of the Israel Philharmonic Orchestra (in Hebrew)
- The Marc Lavry Heritage Foundation
