= List of songs about Jerusalem =

This is a list of songs about Jerusalem, including major parts of the city such as individual neighborhoods and sections. Religiously significant to all three Abrahamic religions for centuries, Jerusalem has been artistically associated with widely varied concepts. There are many songs about Jerusalem from various time periods, especially nationalistically-themed songs from the time of the Six-Day War, when East Jerusalem passed from Jordanian control to Israeli.

Additionally many Biblical Psalms, styled as songs, were written specifically about Jerusalem. Jewish liturgy and hymns are rife with references to Jerusalem.

== Hebrew language ==
- "Jerusalem" by Kenneth Lampl (2012) performed by the Zamir Chorale of Boston
- "Al Chomotaich" (Hebrew: על חומותיך ירושלים, "On Your Walls, Jerusalem") by Yaakov Shwekey
- "Anachnu olim elaich, Yerushalayim" (Hebrew: אנחנו עולים אליך, ירושלים, "We coming for you, Jerusalem"), performed by Nira Rabinovich
- "Bisharayich Yerushalayim" (Hebrew: בשערייך ירושלים, "At Jerusalem Gates"), saluting the Israel Defense Forces paratroopers of the Six-Day War
- "Biyerushalayim" (Hebrew: בירושלים, "In Jerusalem") by Miami Boys Choir, (1997)
- "Giv'at HaTahmoshet" (Hebrew: גבעת התחמושת, "Ammunition Hill") by Yoram Taharlev
- "Himnon Hapoel Yerushalayim" (Hebrew: המנון הפועל ירושלים, "Hapoel Jerusalem F.C. anthem") by Dudu Barak
- "Hineh ani ba" (Hebrew: הנה אני בא, "Here I Come", on the conflict of everyday life in Jerusalem vs. Tel Aviv) by Hadag Nahash
- "Hineni kan" (Hebrew: הנני כאן, "Jerusalem, here I am") by Yehoram Gaon and Harel Skaat
- "Im eshkachech Yerushalayim" (Hebrew: אם אשכחך ירושלים, 'If I Forget Thee Jerusalem') by Miami Boys Choir, (2001)
- "Kinor David" (Hebrew: כינור דוד, "The violin of King David"), by Avihu Medina
- "Lemaan tzion lo eshkakhekh" (Hebrew: למען ציון לא אשכחך, "For Zion I will not forget you") by Miami Boys Choir
- "Lach Yerushalayim" (Hebrew: לך ירושלים, "For you, Jerusalem") by Amos Etinger, performed by Ronit Ofir
- "Lekol' echad Yerushalayim" (Hebrew: לכל אחד ירושלים, "Jerusalem is for each one") by Nathan Yehonathan, performed by Dorit Reuveni
- "Leshana haba'a biyerushalayim" (Hebrew: לשנה הבאה בירושלים, "Next Year in Jerusalem"), by Miami Boys Choir
- "Me'al pisgat Har Hatzofim" (Hebrew: מעל פסגת הר הצופים "From Atop Mount Scopus") by Avigdor Hameiri, performed by Yehoram Gaon
- "Shomer hahomot" (Hebrew: שומר החומות "Walls guardman"), performed by Military orchestra of Central Command of IDF
- "Sisu et Yerushalayim" (Hebrew: שישו את ירושלים "Rejoice in Jerusalem"), performed by Dudu Fisher
- "Veliyerushalayim" (Hebrew: ולירושלים, "And to Jerusalem") by Miami Boys Choir
- "Yerushalayim" by Avraham Fried, (1995)
- "Yerushalayim" performed by Esther Ofarim (1978)
- "Yerushalayim" by Shimrit Or, performed by Ilana Avital
- "Yerushalayim" by Mordechai Ben David
- "Yerushalayim" by Miami Boys Choir (2007)
- "Yerushalayim Ha'akheret" (Hebrew: ירושלים האחרת, "The Different Jerusalem"), performed by Izhar Cohen and in 2017 at the ceremony for the 50th anniversary of reunification of Jerusalem by Sarit Hadad
- "Yerushalayim Can You Hear Our Voice" by Miami Boys Choir, (2001)
- "Yerushalayim shel barzel" (Hebrew: ירושלים של ברזל, "Jerusalem of Iron") by Meir Ariel
- "Yerushalayim shel Beitar" (Hebrew: ירושלים של בית"ר, "Jerusalem of Beitar"), performed by Itzik Kala and others
- "Yerushalayim sheli" (Hebrew: ירושלים שלי, "My Jerusalem") by Dan Almagor and Nurit Hirsh
- "Zot Yerushalayim" (Hebrew: זאת ירושלים, "This is Jerusalem") by Nahum Heyman
- "O Jerusalem" (Hebrew: אם אשכחך ירושלים, "O Jerusalem") by Ben Snof

=== National and folk songs ===
- "Hatikvah", national anthem of Israel, mentions Jerusalem heavily
- "Yerushalayim shel zahav" (Hebrew: ירושלים של זהב, "Jerusalem of Gold") by Naomi Shemer (1967), performed by Shuli Natan, Ofra Haza and many others
- "Lakh Yerushalayim" (Hebrew: לך ירושלים, "For You, Jerusalem")
- "Shabekhi Yerushalayim" (Hebrew: שבחי ירושלים, "Praise the Lord, Jerusalem!"), based on Psalms 147:12–13 (lyrics) and Avihu Medina, performed by Glykeria and many others

=== Jewish liturgy ===
- The third paragraph of the Birkat HaMazon, the Grace After Meals is completely about God blessing Jerusalem and rebuilding it.
- Lekhah dodi (Hebrew: לכה דודי, lit. 'Let us go, my beloved'), written by Rabbi Solomon Alkabetz 16th cet., recited at Kabbalat Shabbat and makes many references to Jerusalem as the royal city and that it shall be rebuilt over its ruins.
- "Uva-u Ha-Ovdim" Book of Isaiah 27:13, speaks of the return of strayed Jews in the lands of Assyria and exiled Jews in the land of Egypt returning to bow before God on the Temple Mount in Jerusalem. A popular melody for these words was composed by Rabbi Shlomo Carlebach.
- "Yerushalayim" by Abie Rotenberg and Shlomo Simcha, on Aish Volume II (2003) is a melody for Psalm 125, verse 2, saying "Hills encircle Jerusalem, and God encircles His people now and forever".
- "Tziyyon ha-lo tishali" (Hebrew: ציון הלא תשאלי, lit. 'Zion, do you not inquire') by Judah Halevi 12th cet.
- "Yefe Noff" (Hebrew: יפה נוף, lit. 'Beautiful scenery'), written by Judah Halevi 12th cet., based on Psalms 48:3, performed by Etti Ankri

=== Shabbat zemirot ===
- "Tzur Mishelo Achalnu" (Hebrew: צור משלו אכלנו, "Rock from whom we have eaten") – the last two stanzas are about having compassion for the city of Zion and for a restoration there.
- "Ya Ribon Olam" (Hebrew: יה ריבון עולם, "God Master of the World") – is a song in Hebrew and Aramaic whose final stanza is about the restoration of the Temple in "Jerusalem, City of Beauty"
- "Yom zeh l'Yisrael" (Hebrew: יום זה לישראל, "This is a day for Israel") – the final stanza asks God to remember the ruined city, Jerusalem.

== Arabic language ==
- "Al Quds Al Atiqa" (Arabic: القدس العتيقة, "Jerusalem's Ancient Streets") by Fairuz
- "Zahrat al-Mada'en" (Arabic: زهرة المدائن, "The Flower of the Cities") by Fairuz (1967)
- "Al Quds" (Arabic: القدس, "Jerusalem") by Latifa and Kazem al-Saher
- "Al Quds De Ardina" (Arabic: القدس دي أرضنا, "Jerusalem is Our Land") by Amr Diab
- "Al Quds Lena" (Arabic: القدس لنا, "Jerusalem is Ours") by Hakim
- "Al Quds Haterga' Lena" (Arabic: القدس هترجع لنا, "Jerusalem Will Return to Us") by Hisham Abbas, Hakim, Anoushka, et al.
- "Al Quds Al Jarihi" (Arabic: القدس الجريح, "Wounded Jerusalem") by Fuad Al Jad (2001)
- "Ya Quds" (Arabic: يا قدس, "Oh Jerusalem") by Nawal Elzoghbi
- "Ala Bab al Quds" (Arabic: على باب القدس, "At the Doors of Jerusalem") by Hani Shaker
- "Abda´ meneen?" (Arabic: أبدأ منين؟, "Where should I begin?") by Zena
- "Hamaam al-Quds" (Arabic: حمام القدس, "Doves of Jerusalem") by Julia Boutros, Amal Arafa and Sausan Hamami
- "Il-Gudes Naadat" (Arabic: القدس نادت, "Jerusalem called") by Al Waad

== English language ==
- "The Holy City" by Frederic Weatherly and Stephen Adams, released in 1892
- "Jerusalem is Mine" by Kenny Karen, released in 1975
- "Jerusalem" by Sleep, first released in 1999
- "Jerusalem" by Steve Earle, first released in 2002
- "Jerusalem" by Matisyahu, released in 2006

== Italian language ==
- "Gerusalemme" by Amedeo Minghi, (1999)

== Russian language ==
- "Dnyom i Nochyu" (Russian: Днём и ночью) also known as "Ierusalim" (Russian: Иерусалим, "Jerusalem") by Alexander Rosenbaum
