= Dudaim =

Israeli folk duo

Ha'Dudaim הדודאים
- Genres: Folk
- Years active: 1957–1993
- Labels: Hed Artzi; Elektra
- Past members: Benny Amdursky; Israel Gurion

The Dudaim (Hebrew: הדודאים) was an Israeli folk duo which was active between the years 1957–1993, consisting of vocalist Benny Amdursky (1931-1994) and guitarist Israel Gurion (born 1935). The name of the band Dudaim comes from the Hebrew word for the mandrake plant, which is native to the Mediterranean region.

== History ==
Dudaim was formed in 1957 when Amdursky and Guriun met in a party in Jerusalem and started singing together. Their first album Erev Shel Shoshanim came out in 1957, and included the hit song in the same name. Another hit song from the same album was Tapuach Hinani (תפוח חינני) which was later recorded by the Weavers. In 1959, they toured Europe and the USA. They recorded several albums in France and the US, where they changed their name to Ben and Adam for promotional purposes.

In 1965-6, they collaborated with Arik Einstein as the Yarkon Bridge Trio. In August The trio was invited to perform in an Israel-themed show at the Paris Olympia, a performance which led to a two-album deal with French producer Eddie Barclay In September 1965 the trio released its second album, HaTochnit HaChadasha (The New Program; Hebrew: התכנית החדשה), following which the trio embarked on a tour in Europe. In January 1966 the trio voted best entertainment group for the Kinor David award.

In the '70s the Dudaim started working as a duo again, performing in the Israeli Song Festival twice, and taking first prize in 1972, together with Josie Katz, performing the song "Tov li Lashir" (טוב לי לשיר). In 1971, they released the album HaOlam beShachor veLavan (העולם בשחור ולבן, "The World in Black and White"), produced and arranged by Matti Caspi.

In 1973, they teamed up with the female duo Susan and Fran, who brought the folk style from Canada, and released Keset Be'anan ("Rainbow"), which contained British and American folk songs translated to Hebrew. Their 1979 album, הם רוכבים ושרים (They Ride and Sing) was once again arranged by Matti Caspi.

In 1985 they released a joined album with the Parvarim, and went on a successful national tour together. In 1988 they performed in a thirty-year anniversary event at the Hamam club in Jaffa, under the musical management of Danny Robas. They again performed at the Hamam in 1989 with Spanish singer and musician Paco Ibanez, commemorating the 50th anniversary of the Spanish Civil War.

Their last album, זה לא אותו הבית (It's Not the Same House), was released in 1990. It included songs by Shalom Hanoch, Danny Sanderson, Boaz Sharabi and Kobi Luria.

Benny Amdursky died of cancer in 1994. At the end of 2009, Israel Gurion and Benny Amdursky's son, Assaf Amdursky, toured with the songs of the Dudaim, and following the tour's success, they recorded the album שרים הדודאים (The Dudaim Sing) in 2013, which received an Israeli Gold Album Award.
