= Pello Joxepe =

"Peio Joxepe" is a traditional Navarrese song. It is very popular in the Basque Country, as its music is used by bertsolariak to improvise their compositions. Therefore, it may be sung with different lyrics.

In 2005, "Pello Joxepe" became known worldwide, when it was published that the melody of the Israeli song "Yerushalayim Shel Zahav" ("Jerusalem of Gold") was partially inspired by its melody. The Spanish singer Paco Ibáñez offered a concert in Israel in 1962, where the famous Israeli songwriter and singer Naomi Shemer could hear the lullaby.

Shemer had consistently denied the two songs had any connection, until a deathbed confession in June 2004. Stricken with cancer — which she felt might have been caused by her deception — she confessed to fellow composer Gil Aldema that she had, in fact, heard "Pello Joxepe" prior to writing "Jerusalem of Gold". She instructed Aldema to make an announcement after her death.

After the conquest of Eastern Jerusalem by Israel in 1967, "Yerushalayim Shel Zahav" became the symbol for the united city.

== Lyrics and music ==
Hau pena eta pesadumbria!
Senarrak haurra ukatu.
"Pello Josepe, bihotz nirea,
haur horrek aita zu zaitu.
haur horrentzako beste jaberik
ezin nezake topatu".

"Fortunosoa nintzela baina
ni naiz fortuna gabea.
Abade batek eraman ditu
umea eta andrea.
Aita berea bazuen ere
Andrea nuen nerea."

=== Translation ===
While Peter Joseph is in the bar,
a boy is born in Larraun.
While Peter Joseph is in the bar,
a boy is born in Larraun.
He went home and is said to say:
"It will not be mine,
let this child's mother find
who is this child's father."

What a pity and sadness!
The husband refusing the child.
"Peter Joseph, my heart.
this child has you as a father.
For this child, another owner
could not be found."

"I am fortunate,
but I have no fortune.
A priest has taken
the kid and the wife.
Although it had his father,
I had my wife."
