= Naarot Reines =

Israeli rock band

Naarot Reines (Hebrew: נערות ריינס), Reines Girls in English, is an Israeli rock band, founded by Roei Freilich and Guy Goldstein in 2004. The band plays basic rock, influenced by the end of the 1970s romantic punk. Despite its name, all its members are male.

== History ==
The bassist Guy Goldstein and the lead vocalist Roei Freilich were playing together in the 1990s in their birth town, Haifa. They founded the band, Naarot Reines, in 2004 in Tel Aviv. At the beginning, Miki Coklewitch joined the band as the drummer, and in 2006 he was replaced by Nir Wetstein. The name of the band was taken from the side street Reines, that was known as the street, where men took their "ugly" girlfriends (girls in Hebrew - Naarot) to avoid being seen with them.

== Discography ==
=== Naarot Reines (2009) ===
As of 2004, the band was performing around Israel, and in 2008 they recorded their first album, that was published in March 2009. They have published two singles from the album, "Yom Rishon" (free translation: "Sunday"), which was played in the radio many times, and "Rotze Lehishaer Raev" (free translation: "Want to Stay Hungry"). The album includes 11 songs:

1. Hadavar Ha'amiti
2. Tni Et Atzmech
3. Samba
4. Tehabi Et Hatelevizia
5. Od Halaila
6. Rotze Lehishaer Raev
7. Im Mishehu tzarich Lehitkasher zo at
8. Orev
9. Noala Musarit
10. Inian Shel Ma Becach
11. Yom Rishon

The album was praised by the critics.

=== Nishmor Al Hahaverim (2012) ===
During 2010 the band began to work on their second album, that was called Nishmor Al Hahaverim (free translation: "Watching Our Friends"). The album was produced by Avichai Tuchman, and was published in January 2012. The album hits were "Hiluch Iti" (free translation: "Slow Motion"), and "Bait Aharon (li)" (free translation: "Last House (for Me)").

The Album includes 10 songs:

1. Zo Lo Taut
2. Od Pa'am Im Regesh
3. Ozev Kedei Lehatzil Et Haolam
4. Hiluch Iti
5. Hamtzan
6. Bait Aharon (li)
7. Shiru Itti
8. Lehacir Anashim Hadashim
9. Karaoke
10. Lishmor Al Hahaverim

== See also ==
- Music of Israel
