= Seesaw (poem) =

1906 poem by Hayim Nahman Bialik

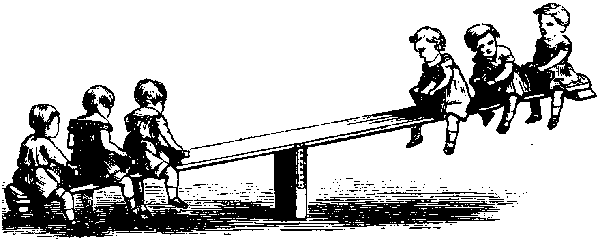
Seesaw

Seesaw (Hebrew: נדנדה, Nadneda) is a Hebrew children's poem by the renowned poet Hayim Nahman Bialik, first published in 1906. The poem, originally written in Ashkenazi pronunciation, was later set to music by Daniel Sambursky and included in Bialik’s anthology “Poems and Songs for Children” (Shirim u-Fizmonim li-Yeladim), published in 1933.

In 1991, the poem was adapted musically by Gil Aldema as part of a medley of Bialik’s children's songs.

== Poem ==
Nad, ned, nad, ned,
Down, up, up and down!
What is above?
What is below? –
Only me,
Me and you;
We are balanced,
Like on scales,
Between the earth
And the skies.

The poem depicts two children playing on a seesaw, joyfully discovering that they are equally weighted - "balanced like scales" - as they alternately rise and fall. This physical motion becomes a metaphor for equilibrium and interdependence.

The poem became widely known among the Jewish Yishuv in pre-state Palestine and was included in various children's song collections throughout the 20th and 21st centuries. It has been performed in many musical styles and arrangements over the years.

Inspired by Bialik's poem, Israeli writer Yehonatan Geffen wrote a song titled Nad Ned, whose chorus quotes the poem’s opening lines. The song was composed and performed by Yehuda Poliker.

== Interpretation ==
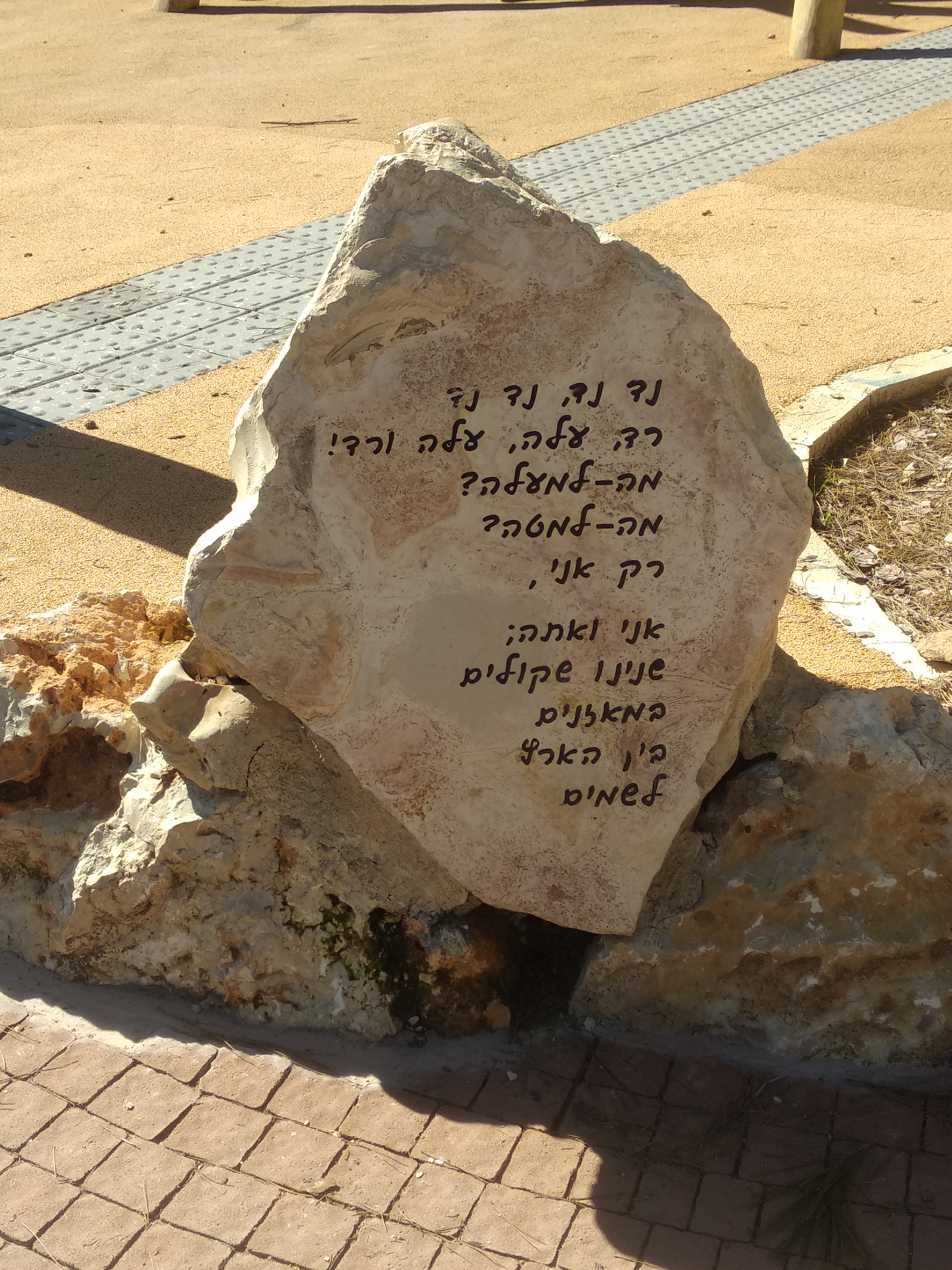
A verse from the poem is engraved in a garden dedicated to Bialik in the Beit HaKerem neighborhood of Jerusalem, illustrating its lasting presence in Israeli cultural memory.

Some literary scholars suggest that Bialik’s Seesaw touches on philosophical and theological themes, referencing a Midrashic prohibition from Genesis Rabbah 1:10:

“You are not permitted to ask: What is above? What is below? What was before? What will be after?”

According to this interpretation, the poem playfully challenges orthodox religious boundaries by alluding to questions about the divine, the underworld, eternity, and creation, topics deemed beyond human comprehension. In his book "What is Above, What is Below" (2022), Lior Tal Sadeh argues that the poem reflects Bialik’s effort to reconcile spiritual ideals with material reality. He shows how Bialik, in a speech given at the opening of the Hebrew University, explicitly rejected dualism between spirit and matter, stating:

“We do not recognize a separation between the physical and the spiritual… We do not follow the House of Shammai who claimed the heavens were created first, nor the House of Hillel who said the earth came first — but rather the Sages, who said both were created together and cannot exist without one another.”
