= Hanina Karchevsky =

Israeli composer

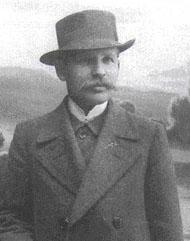
Hanina Karchevsky

Hanina Karchevsky (1877-20 December 1925), was a Jewish composer, conductor and music teacher who became an important figure in the establishment of the musical culture of the pre-state Yishuv and of Israel.

== Biography ==
Karchevsky was born in 1877 in Petrovka, a village in Russian-ruled Bessarabia. He moved with his parents to the nearby town of Bender, where he studied Torah. At the same time, he learned piano and notation with his teacher, who was also a cantor (hazzan) where he was heard by the well-known cantor Zeidel Rovner, who convinced his parents to move to Kishinev, so the child could join the synagogue's choir. At the age of 22, he moved to Warsaw, where he conducted an army orchestra.

As a supporter of Zionism, he immigrated to the Land of Israel in 1908, during the Second Aliyah. He taught music there in several institutes, among them the Herzliya Hebrew Gymnasium, where he founded an orchestra and a choir. The choir performed around the country and participated in the inauguration ceremony of the Hebrew University of Jerusalem. He composed children and pioneer songs, as well as orchestral compositions. His songs became very popular in the period, and became milestones in the history of the pre-state Yishuv's and of Israel's musical culture. He also provided free classes for poor children.

On 20 December 1925, he took his own life by hanging himself at his Tel Aviv home. He left behind a mother, and a married sister who was pregnant at the time and a mother to a ten-year-old daughter. The reasons for his suicide remain unclear.
