= Kinor David =

Annual Israeli cultural award

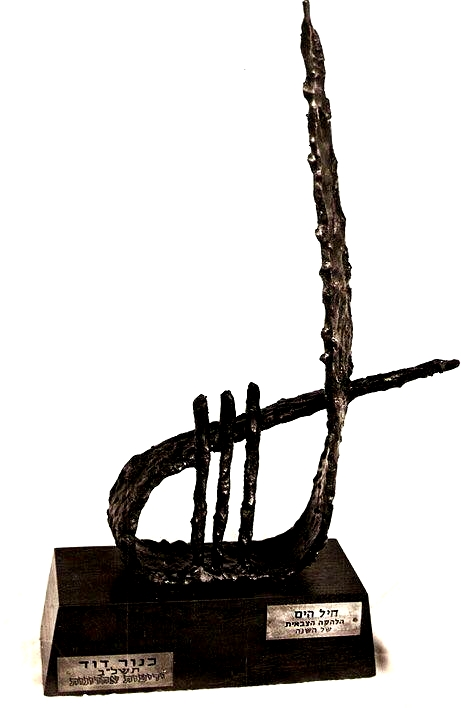
Kinor David award

Kinor David (Hebrew: כינור דוד; lit: "David's Harp") is an annual Israeli cultural award.

== History ==
The Israeli newspaper Yedioth Ahronoth presented the Kinor David Award from 1964 to 1986 for outstanding achievement in entertainment, theatre, film, music, and broadcasting.

Awards were presented for the following categories:

- Play/Show of the Year
- Actor and Actress of the Year (theater/stage)
- Actor and Actress of the Year (film)
- Director of the Year
- Best Film of the Year
- Singer (female and male) of the Year
- Band of the Year
- Radio Program of the Year
- TV Program of the Year
- Composer of the Year
- Lyricist of the Year
- Best Dance/Ballet Show of the Year
- Dancer (male and female) of the Year

In 1994, Yedioth Aharonoth established a similar award, "Golden Screen".

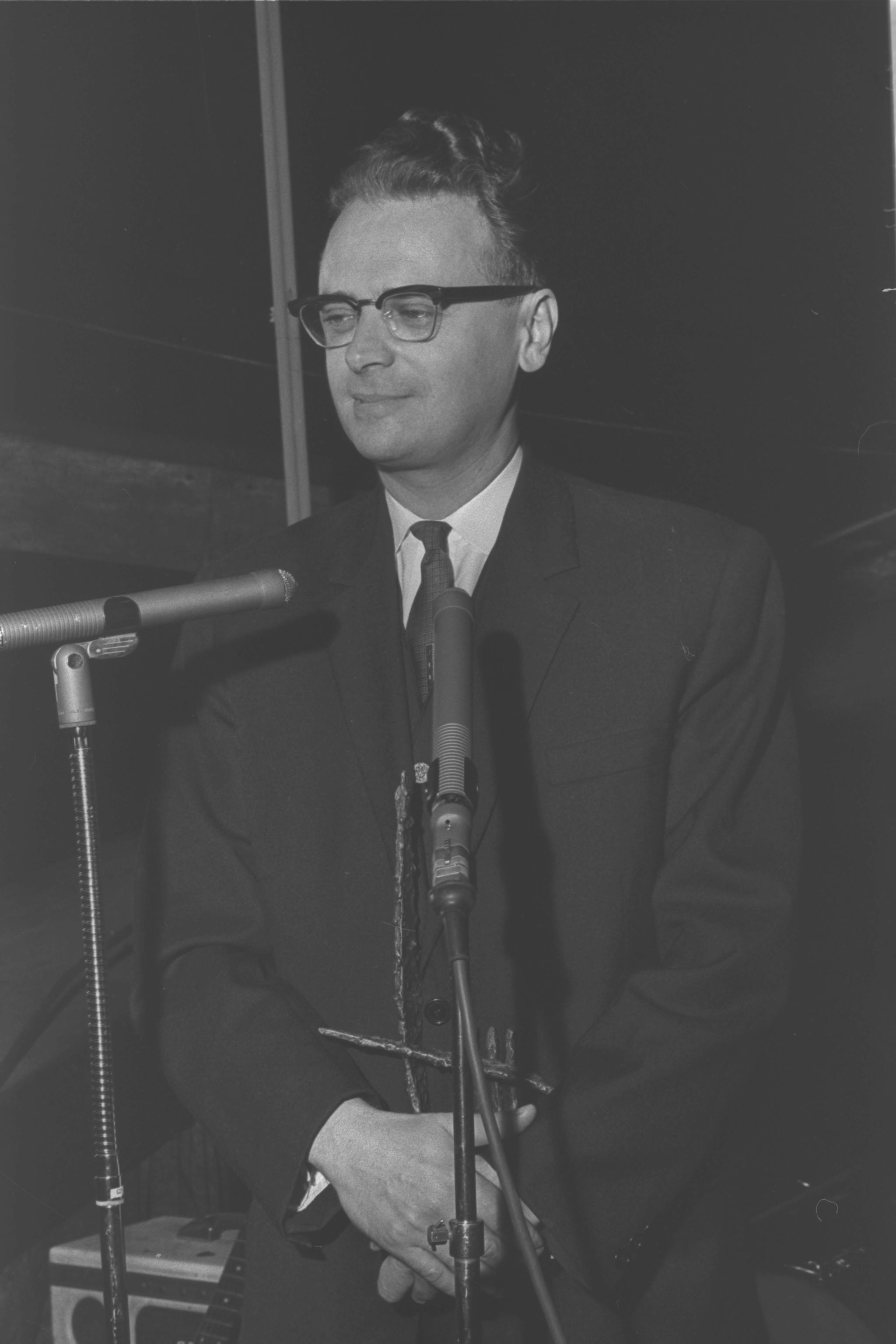
Ephraim Kishon being awarded the Kinor David in 1964.

== Recipients ==
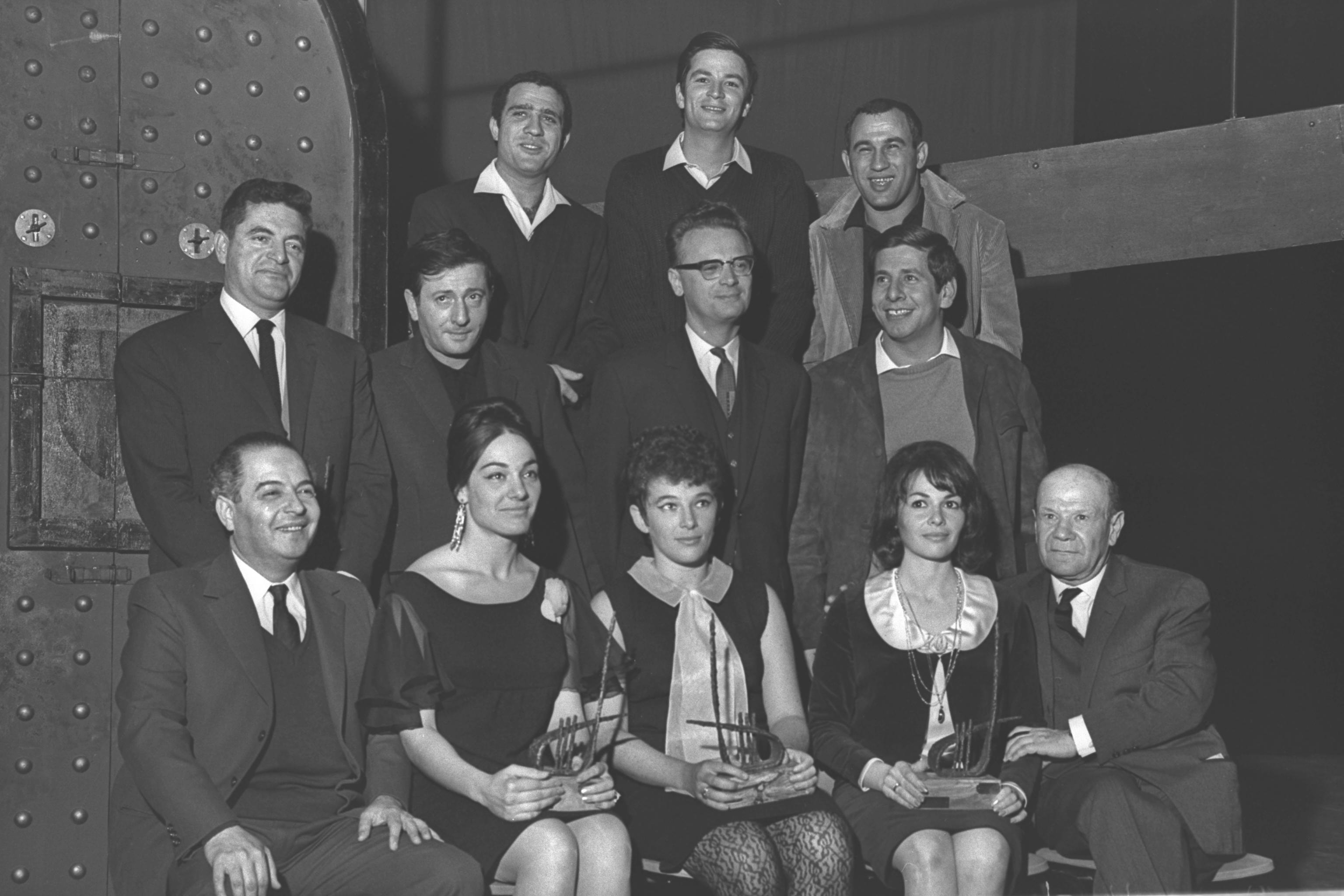
Group photo of the 1964 recipients of Kinor David prize.

- Gila Almagor
- Yardena Arazi
- Shlomo Artzi
- Chocolate, Menta, Mastik
- Ran Eliran
- Hakol Over Habibi
- Nurit Hirsh
- Ilanit
- Oded Kotler
- Shuli Natan
- Daniel Pe'er
- Orna Porat
- Dov Seltzer
- Naomi Shemer
- Chaim Topol
- Haim Yavin
- Zion Zadok
- Uri Zohar
- Ze'eva Cohen
- Dudu Topaz

== Venue ==
- Heichal HaTarbut
