= David Ma'aravi =

Israeli artist

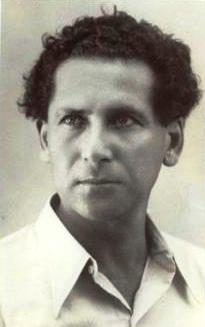
David Ma'aravi

David Ma'aravi (1896 - May 23, 1945), an early Israeli sculptor, painter and composer. A fundamental figure in the development of Israeli music and art.

== Biography ==
David Ma'aravi was born in 1896 in Ekaterinoslav, Russia, now Ukraine. He learned Hebrew and Jewish history from his father, a Hebrew teacher. In 1911, at the age of 15, he immigrated to the Land of Israel on his own. In Israel, he studied sculpture and painting at the Bezalel Academy of Arts and Design, where he studied with Abel Pann. When the residents of Tel-Aviv were expelled from their home in the First World War, he became a guard, and later a farmer.

Later he studied composition for several years with Yoel Engel and taught music and painting for 25 years in Jerusalem and Tel-Aviv.

He composed more than 80 children songs, some of which have become unofficial national folk songs. In addition, he compiled music reading booklets for the elementary school that were very popular at the time

He died on May 23 in Tel Aviv from a heart disease at the age of 49.
