= Kerem HaTeimanim =

"Yemenite Vineyard" in Tel Aviv, Israel

Kerem HaTeimanim כֶּרֶם הַתֵּימָנִים
- Neighborhood of Tel Aviv
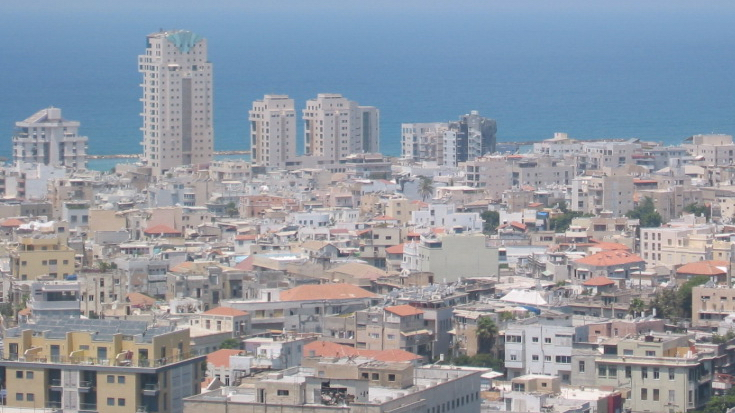
- Aerial view of Kerem HaTeimanim and surrounding areas
- Interactive map of Kerem HaTeimanim
- Coordinates: 32°4′11″N 34°46′5″E
- Country: Israel
- City: Tel Aviv
- Established: 1906
- Founder: Yemenite Jewish immigrants
- Named for: A Yemenite guard of Yosef Moyal's vineyard

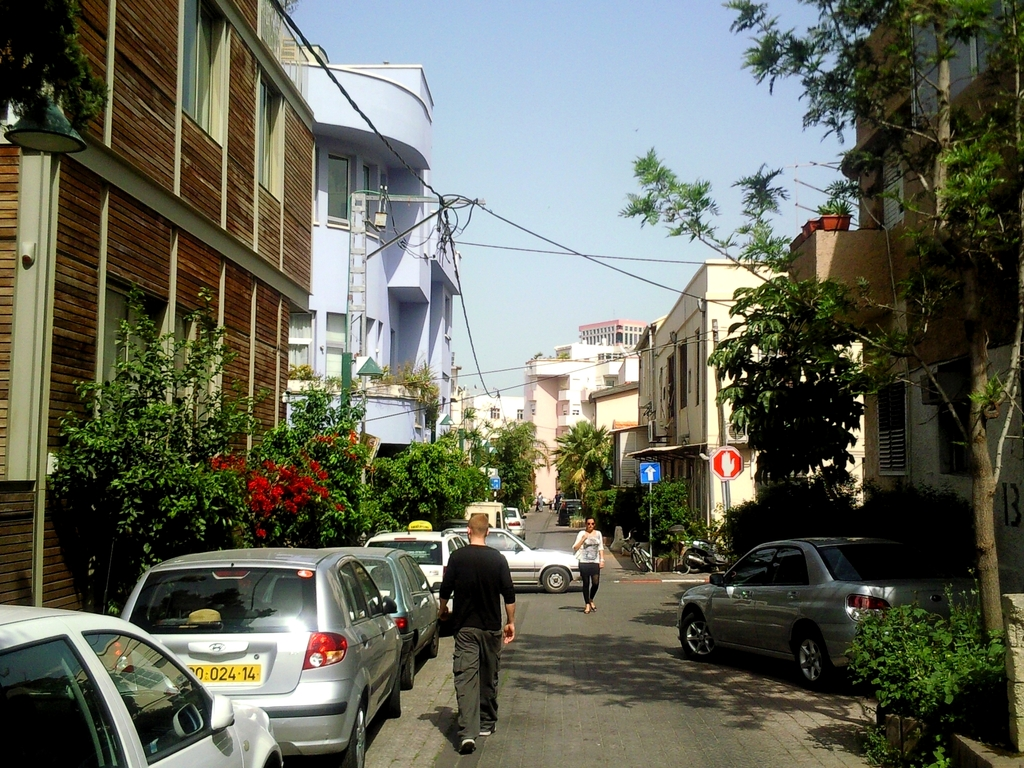
Rabbi Akiva Street

Kerem HaTeimanim (Hebrew: כֶּרֶם הַתֵּימָנִים, lit. 'Vineyard of the Yemenites') is a neighborhood in the center of Tel Aviv, Israel. The neighborhood is adjacent to the Carmel Market.

== History ==
Kerem HaTeimanim was established in 1906 by Yemenite-Jewish immigrants on lands which belonged to Aharon Chelouche, Yosef Moyal, and Haim Amzaleg. It was a poor neighborhood, with many of the single-story homes built with cheap materials such as wooden beams and tin roofing. In 1926, the WIZO women's volunteer organization opened an infant welfare center in the neighborhood operated by two nurses sent to England to study healthcare for young mothers and babies.

In the early 1970s, Lehakat Tzlilei Kerem HaTeimanim (Sounds of the Vineyard Band) was formed by Kerem HaTeimanim guitarist Moshe ben Mush and singer Yosef "Daklon" Levi, a band that achieved fame in south Tel Aviv and beyond.

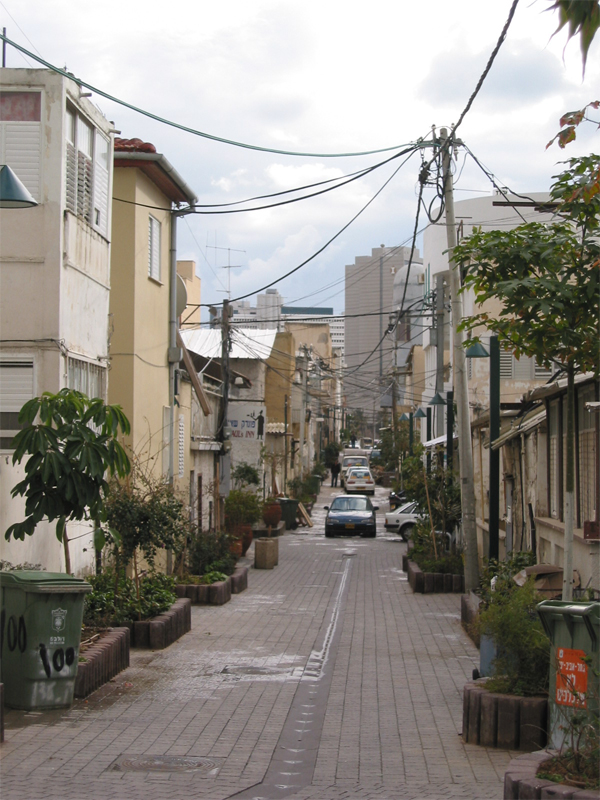
A street in the neighbourhood

Today, Kerem HaTeimanim is in the process of gentrification. Many of the original residents have been replaced by French and other foreign residents who purchased property there for investment. The neighborhood is still home to traditional Yemenite restaurants. In 2004, Lev HaIr Tower became the neighborhood's tallest building. The tower holds a public library, offices and several commercial businesses. It is a predominantly religious neighborhood where eateries are closed on the Sabbath.

Zohar Argov, a 1980s Yemenite Israeli singer who grew up in Rishon LeZion made an album entitled Bekerem Hateymanim in celebration of the neighborhood's significance for Yemenite Israeli culture.

== Origin of the name ==
According to the story, the original version of the neighborhood's name is "Kerem HaTeimani" (The Yemenite Vineyard), and its origin comes from the Yemenite guard who guarded Yosef Moyal's vineyard.

== Notable residents ==
Notable residents include Knesset Member Michael Ratzon of the Likud, singer Boaz Sharabi and Israeli footballer Pini Balili.

The musical duo, Nissim Menachem and Yossi Khoury of The Parvarim were residents of the suburb and the name of their band "Parvarim" ("suburbs") is a reference to Kerem HaTeimanim.

== See also ==
- Neighborhoods of Tel Aviv
