= Jerusalem of Gold =

Hebrew song written by Naomi Shemer

"Jerusalem of Gold" (Hebrew: ירושלים של זהב, romanized: Yerushalayim Shel Zahav) is an Israeli song written by Naomi Shemer. Often contrasted to Israel's national anthem, Hatikva, the original song expressed the deep longing of many Jews to return to Jerusalem's Old City and eastern areas. These areas had been inaccessible to Jews after the 1948 Palestine War, when the city was divided and East Jerusalem came under Jordanian control. Following Israel's victory in the Six-Day War, Shemer added a final verse to commemorate the city's reunification under Israeli control and the restored Jewish access to its holy sites.

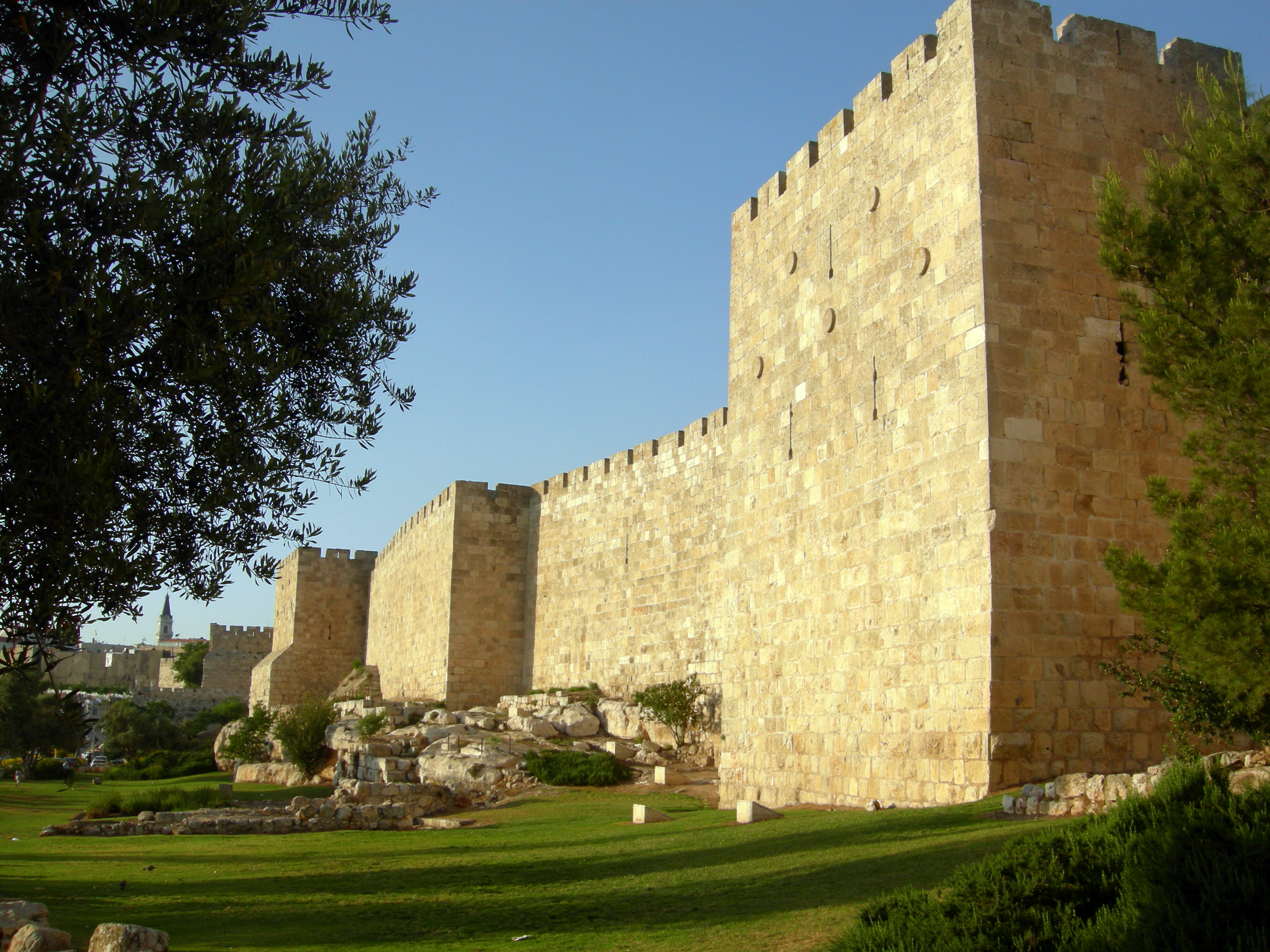
Walls of the old city of Jerusalem as the sun sets

== History ==
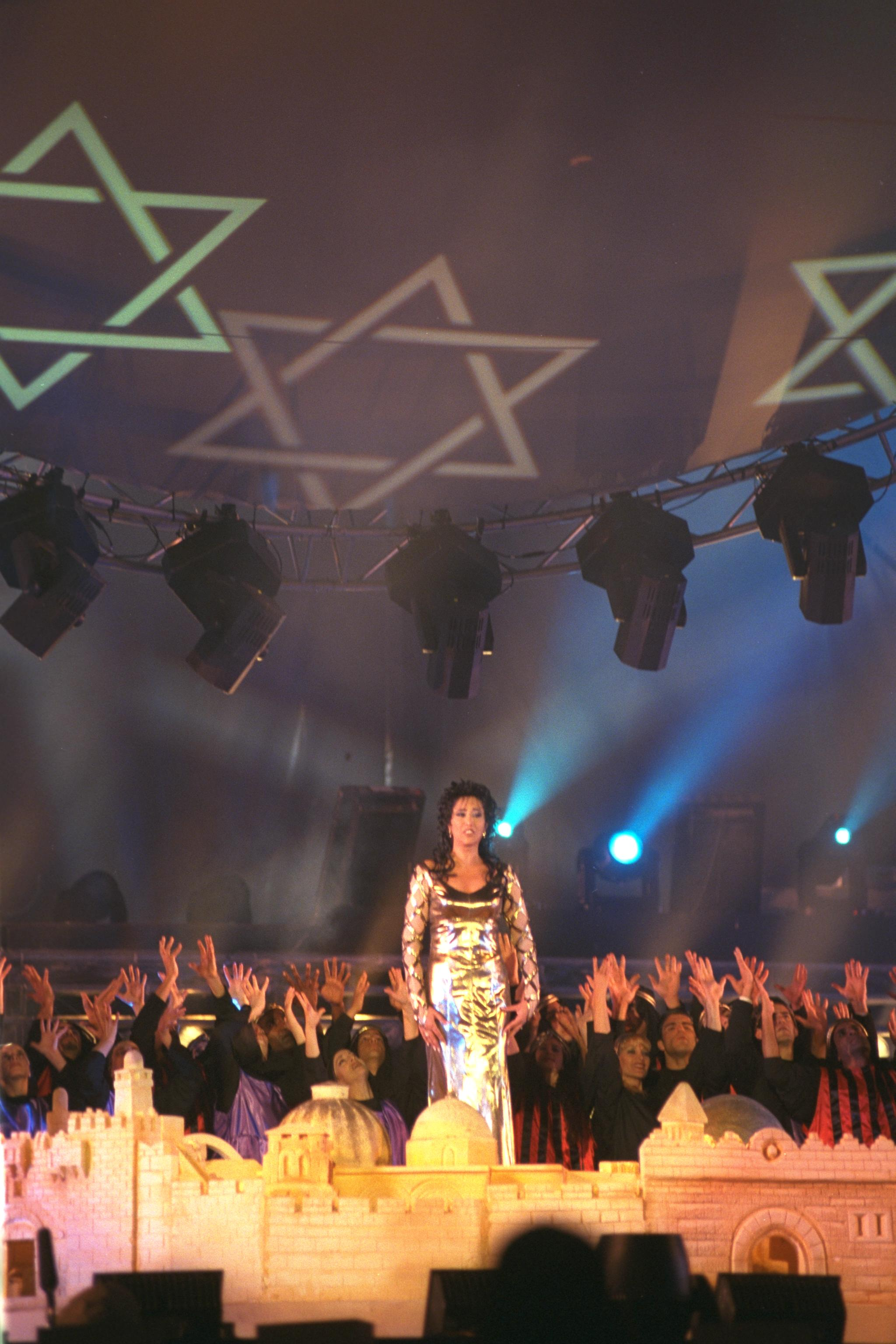
Jerusalem of Gold performed by Ofra Haza

The melody of Yerushalayim Shel Zahav is largely based on the Basque lullaby, Pello Joxepe. Naomi Shemer first heard the melody during a visit by Paco Ibáñez to Israel in 1962, where he performed the song to a group that included Shemer and Nehama Hendel. Shemer later acknowledged hearing Hendel perform Pello Joxepe in the 1960s, and had incorporated elements of its melody into Yerushalayim Shel Zahav. Although Shemer felt regret over the similarity, Ibáñez expressed no ill will, stating that he was pleased the melody had contributed in some way and did not view it as plagiarism.

Naomi Shemer wrote Yerushalayim Shel Zahav for the Israeli Song Festival, held on May 15, 1967 in West Jerusalem. The song was commissioned by West Jerusalem's mayor, Teddy Kollek, as a non-competitive piece. Shemer selected Shuli Natan, an unknown singer at the time, to perform the song.

At the time, the Old City of Jerusalem had been under Jordanian control since the 1948 Palestine War. Jews had been expelled from the Old City and East Jerusalem, losing their homes and possessions. Under Jordanian rule, Jews were barred from returning or entering these areas, and many Jewish holy sites were desecrated or damaged. Three weeks after the song's initial public performance, the Six-Day War broke out. The song quickly became a morale-boosting anthem for the Israel Defense Forces. Shemer performed it for Israeli troops before both the war and the song’s official debut at the Israeli Song Festival, making the soldiers among the first to hear it.

On June 7, 1967, the IDF captured East Jerusalem and the Old City from Jordan. Shemer was about to perform for a troop of paratroopers (who were not engaged in combat at the moment) when she received news that the Western Wall and Temple Mount had been taken by Israeli forces. In response, she hastily wrote a new verse, replacing the original second verse, which lamented the inability to visit the Temple Mount, with a triumphant one that celebrated Israel’s return to the Old City—informing the paratroopers through the song that Israel had captured the holy sites. The new verse referenced the sounding of the shofar at the Temple Mount, a tribute to Rabbi Shlomo Goren, who had blown the shofar upon the capture of the Western Wall. Shemer later clarified that the new verse was not intended to replace the original, and that the original three verses should remain the official version of the song.

"Yerushalayim Shel Zahav" was chosen as the "Song of the Year" in Israel in 1967 and "Song of the Jubilee" on Israel's 50th Independence Day in 1998.

== Themes ==
Many of the lyrics draw from traditional Jewish poetry and themes, particularly those focused on exile and the longing for Jerusalem. The phrase "Jerusalem of Gold" references a piece of jewelry mentioned in a well-known Talmudic legend about Rabbi Akiva. The line "To all your songs, I am a lyre" alludes to Zion ha-lo Tish'ali, one of the "Songs to Zion" by Rabbi Yehuda Halevi, which includes the verse: "I cry out like the jackals when I think of their grief; but, dreaming of the end of their captivity, I am like a harp for your songs."

The song is interwoven with mournful Biblical references to the destruction of Jerusalem and the exile of the Jewish people. איכה (the lament "How?") is the opening word of the Book of Lamentations, and its traditional Hebrew title; the phrase "the city that sits solitary" appears in the second stanza of the song. The line "If I forget thee, O Jerusalem" is drawn from Psalm 137, which begins with "By the rivers of Babylon, there we sat down and wept, when we remembered Zion." This sorrowful imagery contrasts with the joyous return from exile depicted in the fourth verse. The phrase "Like the kiss of a Seraph" references Isaiah 6:7.

Talmudic references are also present in the song. The phrase "and to adorn crowns to you" invokes the Talmudic concept of crowning, which the Talmud uses to describe several things, including the Sandalphon's service to God.

== Other versions ==
According to Society of Authors, Composers and Music Publishers in Israel, there are over 300 versions of the Yerushalayim Shel Zahav. Along with Natan's original recording, notable cover versions have been made by Shemer herself, Yafa Yarkoni, and Ran Eliran. It has been translated into several languages, including by Yafa Yarkoni in Spanish and David Eshet in Yiddish. Osnat Paz's recorded a rendition on his children's record My Land of Israel.

- Israeli-American singer Queen Ofir recorded a modern version of the song for Jerusalem Day 2020.
- Daliah Lavi performed the song in 1969 on the UK record "in honour of the 20th anniversary of the birth of the state of Israel" with the London Festival Orchestra, conducted by Stanley Black.
- Ofra Haza sang one of the most popular versions of the song at Pa'amonei HaYovel (Bells of the Jubilee), Israel's 50th anniversary celebration in 1998.
- Chaim Topol sang the song an English translation on the Ed Sullivan Show (via satellite from London, where he was then appearing in Fiddler on the Roof) just days after the end of the Six-Day War. It was likely the first time the song had been heard in the United States. The song was introduced with the title "Jerusalem, Jerusalem". The words "Jerusalem of Gold" were never used in the lyrics.
- The song appears in the film Pour Sacha.
- The recording from Pour Sacha was reused two years later, in 1993, over the final sequence of the film Schindler's List.
- The Schindler's List soundtrack album featured an alternate recording, performed by The Ramat Gan Chamber Choir Tel Aviv, conducted by Hana Tzur.
- Klaus Meine, recorded a cover of the song with Liel Kolet.
- Demis Roussos recorded a version of the song as well, though he changed the verse melody considerably.
- Phish performs the song on tour and recorded a rendition of the song on the 1994 album "Hoist".
- Roberto Carlos covered a Portuguese version of the song in 2011, singing the verse and the chorus in Hebrew.
- French singer-songwriter Hélène Ségara covered the French version of the song on the 2008 album "Mon Pays C'est La Terre", with the verse and the chorus in the original Hebrew.
- Tamar Giladi, Naomi Shemer's daughter-in-law, recorded the song with mixed Hebrew and English lyrics.
- Shulem Lemmer covered the song on his 2019 album The Perfect Dream.
- Carola Standertskjöld performed a version written by Sauvo Puhtila, in a 1968 recording.

The song is the corps song of the La Crosse, Wisconsin, Blue Stars Drum and Bugle Corps. The corps sings it before every competition.

== Schindler's List controversy ==
The song is featured in the 1993 American film Schindler's List and plays near the end of the film. This caused some controversy in Israel, as the song (which was written in 1967) is widely considered an informal anthem of the Israeli victory in the Six-Day War and has no relationship with the subject matter of the movie. In Israeli prints of the film, the song was replaced with Halikha LeKesariya (lit. "A Walk to Caesarea"), which is universally associated with the Holocaust in Israel and was written by World War II resistance fighter Hannah Szenes in 1942.

== See also ==
- Music of Israel
