= Shuli Natan =

Israeli singer

Shuli Natan שולמית נתן
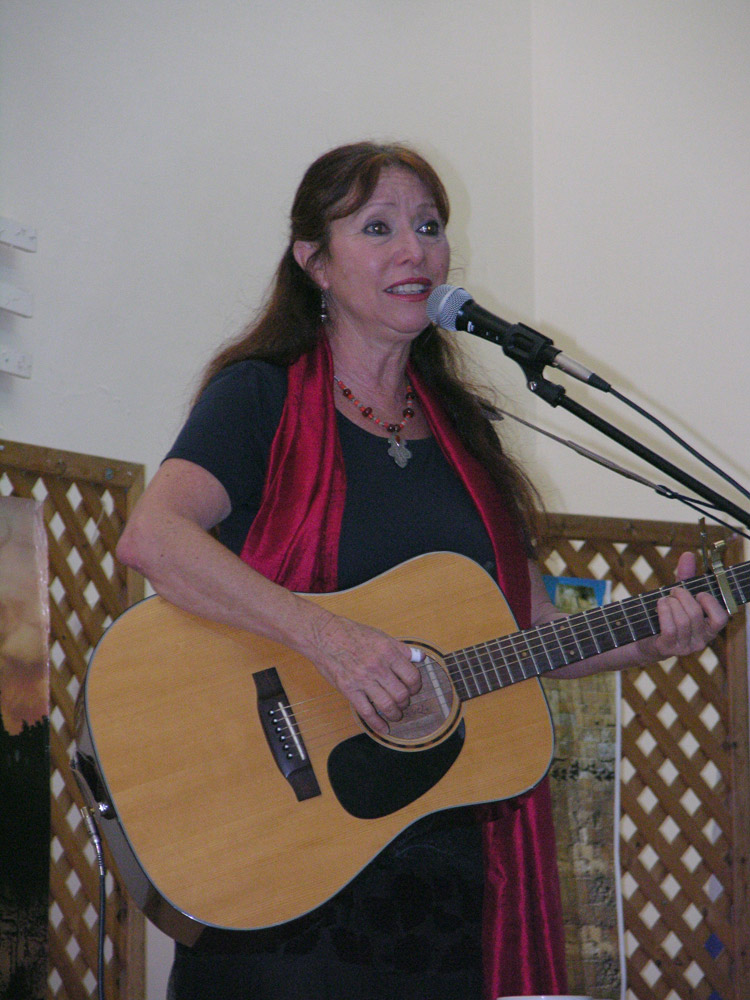
- Natan c. 2007

Background information
- Born: Shulamit Bauernfruend; March 16, 1947 (age 79); London, England
- Occupations: Vocalist, guitarist
- Works: Jerusalem of Gold
- Spouse: Matthew Weiss

Shulamit Natan (Hebrew: שׁוּלָמִית "שׁוּלִי" נָתָן; born March 16, 1947) is an Israeli singer. She is best known for her 1967 rendition of "Jerusalem of Gold" (Yerushalayim Shel Zahav), written by Naomi Shemer.

== Biography ==
Natan was born in London to Joshua Bauernfreund and Eve (nee Nathan), two immigrants to the city from Slovakia and Hamburg respectively. She immigrated with her family to Israel when she was two years old. At the age of sixteen, she began singing and playing the guitar. She appeared on various radio programs before being discovered by Naomi Shemer. She studied music theory at the Rubin Academy of Music and Dance in Jerusalem.

== Singing career ==
Shuli Natan's albums feature Israeli songs, traditional Jewish melodies and songs by Shlomo Carlebach. She achieved fame with a heartfelt rendition of "Jerusalem of Gold" in 1967. In 1968, she began to collaborate with Nechama Hendel. Her 1999 CD Open Roads includes covers of songs which were popular in Israel at the time, such as David D'Or's "Watch Over Us, Child" and Rami Kleinstein's "Never-Ending Miracles".

Natan accompanies herself on the guitar.

She sings Israeli songs, folk songs from around the world, Hassidic and Yiddish songs and songs of the Mizrahi Jewish community. She has sung in Hebrew, English, French, Ladino and Spanish.

== Albums ==
- Beloved Songs
- Songs of Praise
- Open Roads
- Mostly Carlebach
- 1973 אנעים זמירות ושירים אארוג
- 1968 שירי נעמי שמר
- 1967 Israel Song Festival album that made Jerusalem of Gold famous

== See also ==
- Music of Israel
