= Gil Aldema =

Israeli composer and conductor

- גיל אלדמע
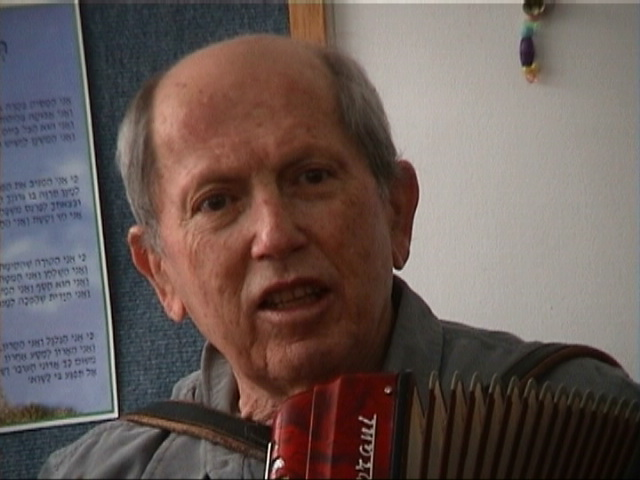
- Gil Aldema
- Born: September 17, 1928; Giv'atayim, Mandatory Palestine
- Died: September 27, 2014 (aged 86); Tel Aviv, Israel
- Occupations: Composer, conductor
- Known for: Composing and arranging Hebrew songs, teaching music
- Awards: Israel Prize (2004)

Gil Aldema (Hebrew: גיל אלדמע; born 17 September 1928 - 27 September 2014) was an Israeli composer and conductor.

== Biography ==
Gil Aldema was born in Giv'atayim in Mandate Palestine. He graduated from the Jerusalem Academy of Music in Jerusalem and Mannes College of Music in New York.

Aldema taught music at Hadassim youth village. Later he worked as a program producer and arranger for the Israel Broadcasting Authority. He composed and arranged songs for folk-ensembles and choirs.

== Awards and recognition ==
In 2004, Aldema was awarded the Israel Prize, for Hebrew song.

== See also ==
- Music of Israel
- List of Israel Prize recipients
