= The Parvarim =

Israeli band

The Parvarim (Hebrew: הפרברים, haparvarim, lit: "The Suburbs") is an Israeli band that was first formed in 1960. The band was originally founded by the duo Nissim Menachem (1938–2016) and Yossi Hury. For a brief while they were joined by Jimmy Siman Tov who joined in 1965 but left after six months. In 1977, Menachem became religious and left the group, he was replaced by Ori Harpaz. The group's name means "the suburbs" and is a reference to the founders' being raised in the Kerem HaTeimanim suburb of Jaffa. The name "Parvarim" was once a reference to the poorer areas of a city.

After Nissim Menachem left The Parvarim, he went on to study at the yeshiva Orot Hatorah in Bat Yam.

In 2015, after 37 years with The Parvarim, Ori Harpaz left the duo and continued his personal career. Shortly afterwards, Hury announced his new partner is Hagai Rehavia. They performed for a few months and then the COVID-19 pandemic started. During 2003 Hury stopped performing and his former partner for 37 years, Ori Harpaz was joined by a young singer and Israeli folk dancer, Elad Shtamer for the show "Singing Parvarim" to preserve the duo's songs and legacy.

Elad Shtamer left Israel at the end of 2023 to live in Toronto, Canada, so musician and singer Kobi Paz took his place. Harpaz and Paz have performed since then with success all around Israel.

== Discography ==
=== First formation ===
- 1967 - בשירי עם ישראלים / B'shirei Am Yisraelim
- 1967 - בשירת לאדינו / B'shirat Ladino
- 1968 - יש לי אהבה / Yesh Li Ahavah
- 1969 - אדום עתיק / Adom Atik
- 1969 - במצב הח"ן / B'matzav Hakhen
- 1969 - Sing International
- 1971 - אני אוהב אותך) בשקט, כמעט בסוד / (Ani Ohev Otakh) B'sheket Kim'at b'Sod
- 1972 - בשירי סיימון וגרפונקל / B'shirei Simon V'Garfunkel
- 1974 - שתי גיטרות והפרברים/ Shtei Gitarot V'haparvarim

=== Second formation ===
- החולמים אחר השמש - 1978 / Hakholmim Akhar Hashemesh
- פרברים טרופיקל - 1981 / Parvarim Tropikal
- שיר אהבה רחוק - 1983 / Shir Ahavah Rakhok
- הדודאים והפרברים - 1985 / Hadudaim V'haparvarim
- מוזיקה - 1989 / Muzika
