= Etti Ankri =

Israeli singer-songwriter

Etti Ankri אתי אנקרי
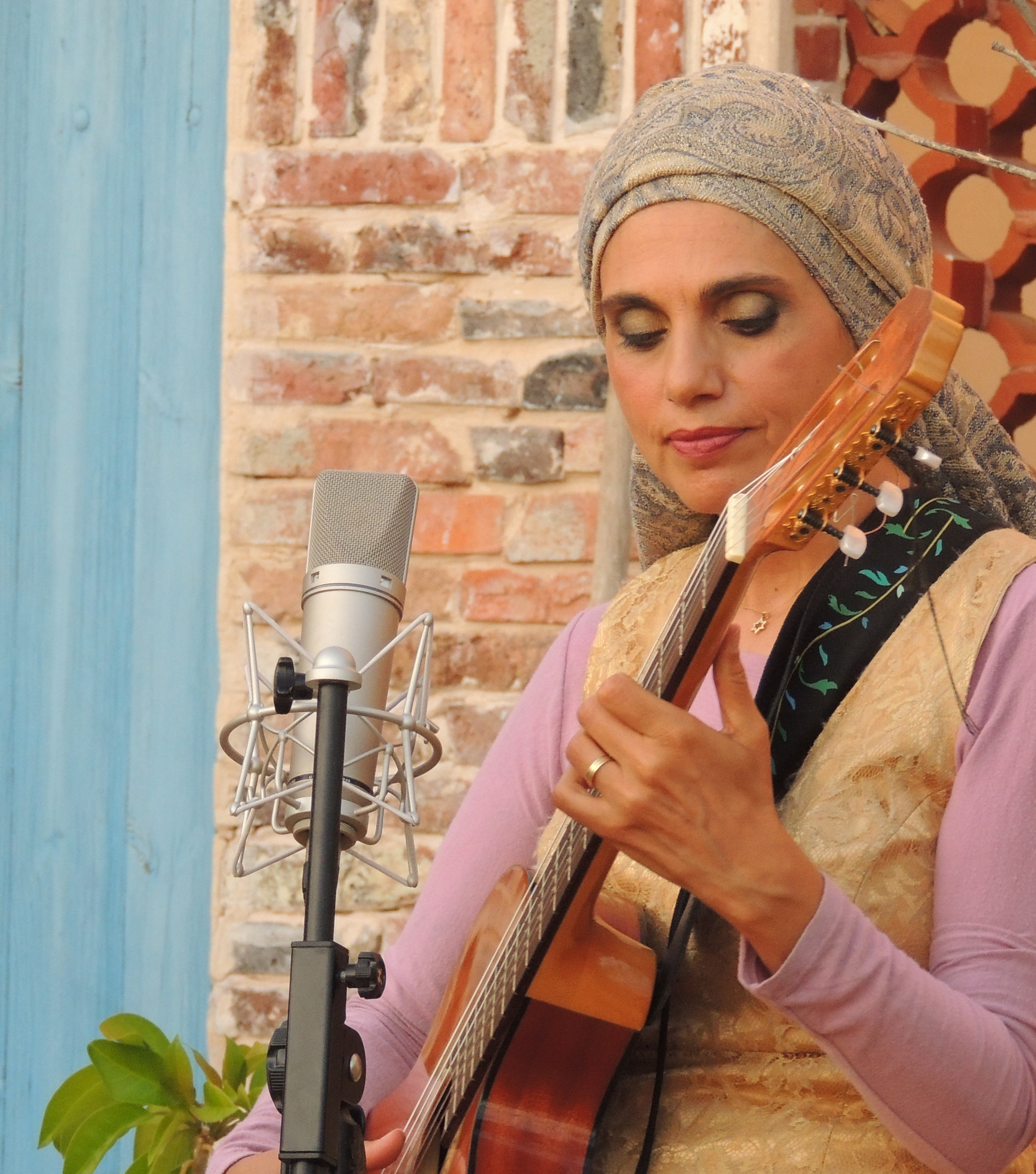

Background information
- Born: January 4, 1963 (age 63)
- Origin: Lod, Israel
- Genres: Israeli rock; Jewish music; folk rock; adult contemporary
- Occupation: Singer-songwriter
- Instrument: Vocals
- Years active: 1990–present

Esther "Etti" Ankri (Hebrew: אתי אנקרי, also spelled "Eti" or "Etty," and "Ankari"; born January 4, 1963) is an Israeli singer-songwriter. She is a former Female Singer of the Year in Israel, and has also performed in the United States, England, and India. Ankri has been called a "rock genius", the "poet of Israeli spirituality," and "the contemporary voice of... Israel."

== Early life ==
Ankri was born in 1963 in Lod, the third of five siblings, to a Tunisian Jewish family. Her father, Andre, was a policeman, and her mother, Hanna, a homemaker. She attended the Ma'apilim elementary school, and the Ramle-Lod high school. Her artistic mentor in her teenage years was the actress Miriam Nevo, who was teaching at the community center in Lod. She served in the Israeli Education Corps, and then studied at the Rimon School of Jazz and Contemporary Music. In 1985, her father committed suicide. She is married to theater actor Doron Linik and has three children. In 2001, she became baalat teshuva.

== Music career ==
Ankri's debut album, I Can See It in Your Eyes (1990), reached double platinum in Israel, where it sold over 90,000 copies. She followed it with six other albums. She is featured in Her Song: Exotic Voices of Women from Around the World (1996), and in Matti Caspi's Duets (2000). She has also teamed with David D'Or for a successful duo.

In 2004 and 2005, she began to explore her spiritual side. In 2005, Ankri toured to promote her double disc, 15-year best-of retrospective collection published by the NMC label. From 2005 to 2007, she performed with Neshama Carlebach, who referred to Ankri as: "one of the most talented and inspiring Israeli stars", saying "It's a great honor to be working with her – she's just incredible." In 2007 she was also featured singing a ballad on the CD Putumayo Presents Israel, a collection put out by Manhattan-based Putumayo which specializes in collections of "world music".

As of 2009 her most recent album was Beshirei Rabbi Yehuda Halevi, which set poems of Yehuda Halevi to music. Ben Shalev of Haaretz described the music as "beautiful", writing "she sings wonderfully. Her voice is clear and precise, radiating vulnerability and self-confidence in equal measure, and it presses emotional buttons similar to the ones it did 20 years ago. And as for the new melodies ... They are marvelous."

Shalev's review continues: "The songs begin with melodic elements that are so familiar and unstyled that they seem like folk songs. The handful of minor chords, the classical guitar strumming, the Mizrahi-Sephardi "aroma".... But then, two or three minutes into most of the songs, something fascinating happens: The circular melodies, meandering along at a low register and seemingly trapped in it, suddenly take flight and open up. This movement usually reflects a point of departure in the text. This happens, breathtakingly, in both "Yona Ma Tehegi" and just as beautifully in "Yefe Nof." .... After the album's midpoint, another lovely thing happens: Ankri stops painting her palette entirely a traditional Jewish-Israeli color, and allows other hues to seep in to the album.... "Eli Rafeni," for example, is an Indian-inflected bossa nova.... it's terrific. "Avdei Zman" verges on Arab music, and "Ye'iruni Raayonai," ... is very reminiscent in its melody and delivery of the Ankri of 'Ro'ah Lecha Ba'einayim' .... On the album it serves as dessert: a side dish, tinged with sweet nostalgia.

Ankri is known for her moving, emotional, and often ethnic pop songs, which she writes herself. Her music has also been described as "introspective", "heartfelt", and "exotic, romantic, and spiritual." Her voice has been described as "mellow" and likened to an alto sax.

== Discography ==
- I Can See It in Your Eyes (1990); double platinum album
- Esther (1993); gold album
- Her Song: Exotic Voices of Women from Around the World (1996); one song
- Nonetheless and Regardless (1997)
- Live Show (1998); with David D'Or
- Duets (2000); one song, "Wheel Within a Wheel," with Matti Caspi
- Sea (2001)
- Millions (2004)
- The Best of Etti Ankri (2005)
- Putumayo Presents Israel (2007); one song
- Beshirei Rabbi Yehuda Halevy (2009)

== Film career ==
Ankri has also appeared in a number of Israeli and US movies. Among them are Deadline (1987) with Christopher Walken, and Steal the Sky (1988) with Ben Cross and Mariel Hemingway.

=== Abridged filmography ===
- Deadline (1987) ... as Samira
- Lehem (1987) ...as Navah, aka Bread
- Te'udat Ma'avar (1987) ... aka Across the Border
- Steal the Sky (1988) ... as Fara
- Resisim (1989) ... aka Burning Memory
- Eretz Hadasha (1994) ... as Roza, aka New Land
- Shabatot VeHagim (1999) ... as Hagit
