= List of Israeli musical artists =

The following is a list of Israeli musical artists, singers and bands.

== A ==
- Ayal Adler
- Moshik Afia
- Aharit HaYamim (End of Days)
- Chen Aharoni
- Chava Alberstein
- Alon De Loco
- Jo Amar
- Etti Ankri
- Keren Ann
- Yardena Arazi
- Zohar Argov
- Meir Ariel
- Shlomo Artzi
- Asaf Amdurski
- Michal Amdurski
- The Apples
- Izhar Ashdot
- Astral Projection
- Astrix
- Gali Atari
- Gilad Atzmon
- Asaf Avidan
- Din Din Aviv
- Alien Project

== B ==
- Ehud Banai
- Eviatar Banai
- Meir Banai
- Yossi Banai
- Yuval Banai
- Shlomo Bar
- Abatte Barihun (Abatte)
- Rami Bar-Niv
- Netta Barzilai
- Danni Bassan
- Batzal Yarok (Scallion)
- Beer7
- Zehava Ben
- Mosh Ben-Ari
- Amir Benayoun
- Dana Berger
- Yoni Bloch
- Borgore
- Yisrael Borochov
- David Broza

== C ==
- Matti Caspi
- The Churchills
- Anat Cohen
- Avishai Cohen, bassist
- Avishai Cohen, trumpeter
- Meytal Cohen
- Yizhar Cohen
- Riff Cohen
- Osher Cohen

== D ==
- DAM
- Daklon
- DJ Raphi
- Yair Dalal
- Shoshana Damari
- David D'Or
- Arkadi Duchin
- Dana International
- Duo Datz
- Roni Duani
- The Dudaim
- Dudu Faruk

== E ==
- Alon Eder
- Seffy Efrati
- Eifo HaYeled (Where's the Child)
- Arik Einstein
- Gad Elbaz
- Electrowavez
- Dudu Elharar
- Ethnix
- Eden Ben Zaken
- Eden Hason
- Eden Alene

== F ==
- Bradley Fish
- Dudu Fisher
- Rami Fortis

== G ==
- Nurit Galron
- Yehoram Gaon
- Aviv Geffen
- Yehonatan Geffen
- Eyal Golan
- Zion Golan
- Efrat Gosh
- Nathan Goshen
- Dan Gottfried
- Gidi Gov
- Dedi Graucher, Orthodox Jewish singer
- Shlomo Gronich
- Amir Gwirtzman
- Eden Golan

== H ==
- The Brothers & the Sisters (Ha'achim veha'achayot)
- HaClique (The Clique)
- Sarit Hadad
- HaDag Nahash (The Snakefish)
- Hadorbanim (The Porcupines)
- HaGashash HaHiver (The Pale Tracker)
- Hagit Yaso
- HaHalonot HaGvohim (The High Windows)
- The Friends of Natasha
- Haivrit
- HaKol Over Habibi (Everything Passes, Habibi)
- Hamsa
- Victoria Hanna
- Shalom Hanoch
- Yaron Hasson
- Israeli Andalusian Orchestra
- HaYehudim (The Jews)
- Ofra Haza
- Nechama Hendel
- Uzi Hitman
- Ariel Horowitz
- Harel Moyal

== I ==
- Ilanit
- Inbal Perlmuter
- Infected Mushroom
- Ishtar
- Ishay Ribo
- Idan Amedi

== J ==
- Noam Jacobson
- Jane Bordeaux
- J.Viewz

== K ==
- Itzik Kala
- Mika Karni
- Katamine
- Shlomo Katz
- Kaveret (Beehive)
- Rami Kleinstein
- Rona Kenan
- Kerach Tesha (Ice Nine)
- Amir Kertes
- Knesiyat Hasekhel (Church of the Mind)
- Yael Kraus
- Kruzenshtern & Parohod, Russophone klezmer-rock band from Tel Aviv, created in 2002
- Noa Kirel

== L ==
- Tzruya Lahav
- Daliah Lavi
- Arik Lavie
- Oren Lavie
- Oshik Levi
- Yishai Levi
- Ivri Lider

== M ==
- Marbin
- Mashina
- Boaz Mauda
- Minimal Compact
- Miri Aloni
- MissFlag
- Monica Sex
- Haim Moshe
- Harel Moyal

== N ==
- Tamer Nafer
- Lior Narkis
- Ron Nesher
- Nikmat HaTraktor (The Tractor's Revenge)
- Achinoam Nini
- Offer Nissim
- Shy Nobleman

== O ==
- Esther Ofarim
- Orphaned Land
- Shaike Ophir
- Kobi Oz
- Odeya

== P ==
- Keren Peles
- Natalia Paruz
- Avi Peretz
- Kobi Peretz
- Inbal Perlmutter
- Eytan Pessen, pianist and opera director of the Semperoper
- Tzvika Pik
- Ravid Plotnik
- Yehuda Poliker
- Pharaoh's Daughter

== Q ==
- Nasreen Qadri

== R ==
- Idan Raichel
- Adi Ran
- Ras Deshen duo
- Yehudit Ravitz
- Yoni Rechter
- Rita
- Danny Robas
- Rockfour
- Pavlo Rosenberg
- Yuval Raphael

== S ==
- Sagol 59 (Purple 59)
- Berry Sakharof
- Daniel Salomon
- Sheygets
- Aris San
- Danny Sanderson
- Seek Irony
- Sfatayim (Lips)
- Shabak S
- Gene Simmons
- Avner Strauss
- Shlomi Shabat
- Boaz Sharabi
- Naomi Shemer
- Sheva (Seven)
- Shiri Maimon
- Shotei HaNvu'a (Fools of Prophecy)
- Ofir Shwartz
- Harel Skaat
- Skazi
- Malka Spigel
- Mike Sharif (born 1979), Israeli Druze
- Edna Stern (born 1977), pianist
- Stormy Atmosphere, progressive metal band
- Subliminal
- Shalva Band

== T ==
- Pe'er Tasi
- Shimi Tavori
- Ninette Tayeb
- Teapacks
- Temper City
- Tislam
- Avi Toledano
- Margalit Tzan'ani
- Tzofei Tel Aviv
- The Voca People
- Totemo

== U ==
- Useless ID

== V ==
- Ilana Vered

== Y ==
- Yaffa Yarkoni
- Yitzhak Yedid
- Shefi Yishai
- Idan Yaniv
- Yoshi (Yochai Blum)

== Z ==
- Ziknei Tzfat (The Elders of Safed)
- Ariel Zilber
- Zino and Tommy
