= Israeli Artists' Association =

The Israeli Artists' Association (Hebrew: אגודת אמני ישראל, אמ"י, EMI), also known as the Israeli Union of Performing Artists, IUPA, headquartered in Tel Aviv, is a public association to represent all types of Israeli performing artists: singers, actors, playwrights dancers, magicians, circus performers, etc., in order to provide assistance to them and protect their professional rights. It was established in 1979.

== Lifetime Achievement Award ==
Each year, the Association presents the Lifetime Achievement Award. The Association celebrated its 40th anniversary in 2021 by awarding its Lifetime Achievement Awards at a ceremony on November 10.

- 2016:Natural Selection vocalist Shlomo Bar, theater actress Rivka Gur, writer Yehonatan Geffen, composer Nurit Hirsh, dancer Sarah Zorb (שרה זורב)), musician Ariel Zilber, composer Dov Seltzer, actor Gadi Yagil, choreographer Yonathan Karmon (יונתן כרמון) and actor Alex Peleg.
- 2018: Shalom Hanoch, Chava Alberstein, David Broza, Margalit Tzan'ani, Hana Laszlo, Miki Kam , Dori Ben Ze'ev, Israel "Sasha" Demidov, Osama Masri (אוסמה מסרי, actor, playwright and artistic manager, (Note: מסרי אוסמה (A)) (Note: "אחווה יהודית וערבית היא המוטו": בתיאטרון עכו מקרבים את הלבבות) Cris Lartiste (כריס לארטיסט, medical comic magician and artist (Note: צחוק חייו: הליצן הרפואי שזכה בפרס מפעל כריס לארטיסט זכה בפרס מפעל חיים של אמ"י אגודת אמני ישראל)), Nitza Saul, Naomi Faran, and Sally Anne Friedland (סאלי אן פרידלנד, dancer and choreographer (Note: Sally Anne Friedland)). In addition, the chairman of the Orna Porat Theater for Children and Youth, Mickey Yerushalmi, won a special "Culture Lover" award for his contribution to Israeli culture.
- 2024: Avner Gadassi, Yardena Arazi, Rivka Zohar, Levana Finkelstein, Hanan Yuval, Gabi Eldor, Said Salameh (סעיד סלאמה, (Note: מפגש עם השחקן ואמן הפנטומימה סעיד סלאמה)), Zvi Sharf, Mashiach Yaakovi, Monica Vardimon, Moshiko Yitzhak Halevi ( (Note: Ha'Levi Moshiko Itzchak)) and Doron B. Levinson. In addition singer Odeya and actor Assaf Yunesh (Assaf Yunesh) received the Breakthrough Award.
