= Dudu Elharar =

Israeil singer and musical artist

Dudu Elharar דודו אלהרר
- Born: January 1, 1945 (age 81); Morocco
- Origin: Israel
- Genres: Pop, Rock, Jazz, Israeli rock, Israeli music
- Occupations: singer, producer, actor, Radio personality
- Years active: 1970–present

Dudu Elharar (also spelled Elharrar; Hebrew: דודו אלהרר; born in 1945) is an Israeli singer, music producer, actor and television and radio presenter.

== Biography ==
Elharar was born in 1945 in a Jewish family in Morocco. In 1950, the family made Aliyah to Israel. Elharar studied in a Habad yeshiva, but did not remain a hasid.

After his service in the Golani Brigade of the Israel Defense Forces, Elharar worked as a water ski instructor in Eilat, and in the evenings, he would sing at nightclubs. There, he met the singer Dani Litani, and they started playing concerts together all around the country. In 1968, Elharar joined the Cameri Theater troupe and played in many of its musical and dramatic productions, among them an adaptation of One Thousand and One Nights and a musical based on Russian protest songs.

In 1970, Elharar recorded his first song as a singer, composed by Litani with lyrics by Yehuda Amichai. Thus he became one of the pioneers of a movement that was popular in Israeli music in the 1970s – recording pop songs with lyrics by Hebrew poets. He recorded songs written by Yaakov Shabtai, Yehuda Halevi, Haim Hefer, Meir Ariel and other famous poets and composed by Shalom Hanoch, Yochanan Zarai, Matti Caspi, Shosh Reisman, and others.

Later during the 1970s, Elharar, along with guitarist Yosi Piamenta also became one of the pioneers of the fusion of Israeli rock with ethnic Middle Eastern music.

From 1975 to 1978, Elharar was one of the presenters of the popular Israeli children TV show Telepele (טלפלא, Tele-wonder).

After releasing a string of singles, Elharar released his first full-length album in 1976.

In 1978, Elharar produced an album for the first time – Gidi Gov's debut. Later he produced several successful albums by Yehudit Ravitz, Yoni Rechter, Tuned Tone and the hugely popular children album HaKeves HaShisha-Asar (הכבש השישה עשר, The Sixteenth Sheep) with lyrics by Yehonatan Geffen.

While continuing his musical work, mostly as a producers, since the early 1980s Elharar was active in many social endeavors – volunteering for organization that help mentally ill people, prisoners, drug addicts and families who lost their loved ones in the Israeli wars.

Elharar also had a long and fruitful artistic relationship with the songwriter Naomi Shemer. He produced many songs written by her and in 2000 he produced her comeback tour.

Since 1998, Elharar presented a weekly program on the Israel Defense Forces Radio. In the program he played old Israeli songs and openly presented his right-wing worldview. In 2008 he was fired from the station. Elharar blamed the station for promoting left-wing politics, but the station commander Yitzhak Tunik refuted the claims.
