= The Sixteenth Sheep =

1978 Israeli children's book and album

Studio album by Yehonatan Geffen, Yoni Rechter, Gidi Gov, Yehudit Ravitz, and David Broza
- Released: November 22, 1978
- Recorded: 1978
- Studio: Triton Studios
- Genre: Children's
- Length: 33:02 (1978 release); 41:24 (1991 re-issue)
- Language: Hebrew
- Label: CBS Israel Records
- Producer: Dudu Elharar

The Sixteenth Sheep, also known as The Sixteenth Lamb (Hebrew: הכבש השישה עשר, romanized: HaKeves HaShisha Asar) is a 1978 Israeli children's book written by Yehonatan Geffen, and later adapted into an album by Geffen that featured collaborations with Yoni Rechter, Yehudit Ravitz, David Broza, and Gidi Gov.

Conceived from a suggestion from the executives of Devir, The Sixteenth Sheep was published in the summer of 1978. It was commercially unsuccessful despite positive reviews. In collaboration with Dudu Elharar, it was turned into a music album and released on November 22, 1978. Since then, there have been several adaptations, including a stage performance at the Cameri Theatre in 1991, and most recently, an ongoing cast reunion in 2025.

It is frequently ranked as one of the greatest albums in the history of Israeli music. Geffen and Rechter were also awarded the ACUM Levin Kipnis award for extraordinary children's creative works in 2014 for their work on the album

== Background and songs ==
The Sixteenth Sheep originated from a suggestion from the executives of the book publisher, Devir, to Yehonatan Geffen. Geffen, who had recently recorded an album with David Broza and Yael Levi titled "Small Talk", went on holiday to Paris to write the book. He wrote it in less than a week. The book was released in the summer of 1978 and received positive reviews. However, it was a commercial failure, and Geffen's publisher was overstocked with unsold copies of the book. Dudu Elharar pitched an idea to adapt the book into a studio album to Geffen, who, while initially hesitant on the idea, later agreed to it. Elharar and Geffen recruited Yoni Rechter, Gidi Gov, David Broza, and Yehudit Ravitz to perform on the album, with Rechter also joining as the main composer. The album's rehearsals lasted for around a month before being recorded at Triton Studios. For the recording sessions, Elharar recruited Yitzhak Klepter and Shem Tov Levi to help with its instrumentation. The recording of the album took 81 hours.

There are a total of 16 (19 for the 1991 CD reissue) songs on The Sixteenth Sheep, all of which are taken directly from the original book. Of these, only five were not composed by Rechter and were instead composed by Broza (Lightning and Thunder), Klepter (I Love), Ada Nestowitz (Hey, I'm Not a Baby Anymore), Shefi Yishai (Little Quarrels), and Rani Golan (When They Say...). A few songs are transitional spoken word tracks narrated by Geffen.

"The Prettiest Girl in the Kindergarten" was written by Geffen about the troubles that a parent may face when dealing with a young child who is suddenly unhappy. Specifically, the song was written about his firstborn daughter, Shira Geffen. In 2020, it was adapted into French by Anat Moshkovski.

"Closed Kindergarten" was the first song that Rechter composed for the album. It is also the song that helped the album become commercially successful. In December 1978, a strike in the Israeli education system led to it receiving airplay on radio stations, due to its lyrics being explicitly about the downbeat mood caused by a kindergarten being closed.

"How a Song is Born" was recorded for the album in 1978, but it would not be included on it until its 1991 reissue on CD. The song is an ars poetica poem about the creative process of songwriting. It makes use of metaphors, including comparing the process to childbirth.

== Reception and legacy ==
The Sixteenth Sheep was released on November 22, 1978, on CBS Israel Records. Reviews of it were positive, although there was confusion over whether it was meant for children or for adults; this was praised in reviews as a positive element of the album. In his positive review of the album on Maariv, Yossi Hersonski praised the album for breaking away from the typical tropes of children's albums of the time, he also praised its maturity.

Despite the positive reviews, the sales for the album were slow. It was not until a strike in the Israeli education system led to the song "Closed Kindergarten" receiving consistent airplay on radio stations, helping to propel the album's commercial performance. This led to a successful tour of the album in 1979.

NMC Music (previously CBS Israel Records) reissued the album on CD in 1991 with 3 bonus tracks that were recorded for the album in 1978 but did not make it onto the original album. These songs were "How a Song is Born", "When I Grow Up", and "Yossi, Yossi".

=== Legacy ===
The Sixteenth Sheep is frequently ranked as one of the greatest albums in the history of Israeli music. In 2014, ACUM awarded Geffen and Rechter the Levin Kipnis award for extraordinary children's creative works for their work on the album. In 1991, it received a theatrical adaptation that was performed at the Cameri Theatre. This adaptation received its own album issued by Hed Arzi Music in 1993. It received a second run in 2009. A later adaptation was made in 2021 and was performed at Habima Theatre, making it the last adaptation of the album done during Yehonatan Geffen's lifetime.

The final cast reunion to involve Geffen during his lifetime was in 2020, which also included a brand new song for the project.

In late 2024, it was announced that the surviving cast of The Sixteenth Sheep would reunite for a tour that featured songs from the album as well as songs from the cast members' careers. The tour premiered in January 2025 and received positive reviews, though a few reviews considered it more of a comeback vehicle for Ravitz.

== Track listing ==
=== 1978 release ===
All lyrics are written by Yehonatan Geffen; all music is composed by Yoni Rechter, unless noted otherwise.

Side one
No.	Title	Lead Vocals	Length
1.	"Lightning and Thunder" (Composed by David Broza)	Broza, Geffen	3:17
2.	"When We Went into town to visit Uncle Ephraim"	Geffen, Gidi Gov	1:21
3.	"I Love" (Composed by Yitzhak Klepter)	Broza, Gov, Rechter, Yehudit Ravitz	2:53
4.	"The Giraffe Has a Long Neck"	Geffen	1:22
5.	"There is a child whose father..."	Geffen	1:20
6.	"The Prettiest Girl in the Kindergarten"	Ravitz	2:28
7.	"The Story about the Green Man"	Geffen	2:26
8.	"Whoever looks"	Broza, Geffen, Gov	1:36
Total length:			16:43

Side two
No.	Title	Lead Vocals	Length
1.	"Hey, I'm Not a Baby Anymore" (Composed by Ada Nestowitz)	Broza, Gov, Nestowitz, Rechter	3:19
2.	"A Smell of Chocolate"	Broza, Gov, Rechter, Ravitz, Geffen	2:04
3.	"Little Quarrels" (Composed by Shefi Yishai)	Broza, Geffen	2:13
4.	"When They Say..." (Composed by Rani Golan)	Broza, Gov, Geffen, Ravitz, Rechter	0:54
5.	"Like the Sea"	Gov, Ravitz, Rechter	1:27
6.	"The Man with the Hair"	Geffen	1:32
7.	"Closed Kindergarten"	Broza, Gov, Ravitz, Rechter	2:18
8.	"The Sixteenth Sheep/Good Night"	Geffen, Rechter	2:32
Total length:			16:19 (33:02)

=== 1991 reissue ===
All lyrics are written by Yehonatan Geffen; all music is composed by Yoni Rechter, unless noted otherwise.

1991 CD reissue
No.	Title	Lead Vocals	Length
1.	"How a Song is Born"	Broza, Gov, Geffen, Rechter	2:30
2.	"Lightning and Thunder" (Composed by David Broza)	Broza, Geffen	3:17
3.	"When We Went into town to visit Uncle Ephraim"	Geffen, Gov	1:21
4.	"I Love" (Composed by Yitzhak Klepter)	Broza, Gov, Rechter, Ravitz	2:53
5.	"The Giraffe has a long neck"	Geffen	1:18
6.	"There is a child whose father..."	Geffen	1:20
7.	"The Prettiest Girl in the Kindergarten"	Ravitz	2:28
8.	"The Story About the Green Man"	Geffen	2:26
9.	"Whoever Looks"	Broza, Geffen, Gov	1:36
10.	"Hey, I'm Not a Baby Anymore" (Composed by Ada Nestowitz)	Broza, Gov, Nestowitz, Rechter	3:19
11.	"When I Grow Up"	Gov, Rechter	3:54
12.	"A Smell of Chocolate"	Broza, Gov, Rechter, Ravitz, Geffen	2:04
13.	"Little Quarrels" (Composed by Shefi Yishai)	Broza, Geffen	2:13
14.	"Yossi, Yossi"	Ravitz	2:02
15.	"When They Say..." (Composed by Rani Golan)	Broza, Gov, Geffen, Ravitz, Rechter	0:54
16.	"Like the Sea"	Gov, Ravitz, Rechter	1:27
17.	"The Man with the Hair"	Geffen	1:32
18.	"Closed Kindergarten"	Broza, Gov, Ravitz, Rechter	2:18
19.	"The Sixteenth Sheep/Good Night"	Geffen, Rechter	2:32
Total length:			41:24

== Personnel ==
- Yehonatan Geffen-spoken word
- Yoni Rechter-piano, keyboard, vocals, arrangement
- Gidi Gov-vocals, backup vocals
- Yehudit Ravitz-vocals, backup vocals
- David Broza-vocals, backup vocals, classical guitar

=== Other Personnel ===
- Shlomo Ydov-acoustic guitar, electric guitar, backup vocals
- Shem Tov Levi-pipe
- Mickey Shaviv-bass guitar
- Arnon Palty-bass guitar
- Alon Hillel-drums
- Ada Nestowitz-spoken word (Track 1, side two)
- Dudu Elharar-producer
