= Red Sea Jazz Festival =

Annual jazz festival in Eilat, Israel

The Red Sea Jazz Festival is a jazz festival held annually in Eilat, Israel.

The Red Sea Jazz Festival was first held in 1987. It is a four-day-long event featuring 9-10 concerts per evening, 6 workshops with guest artists and nightly jam sessions. All performances are held outdoors at the Eilat port. The workshops take place at a nearby hotel.

The festival offers a combination of performances by international jazz artists and local talent. It also provides a venue for collaborative efforts, with special productions exclusive to the festival. Some of these special productions have included Randy Brecker & Mark Egan, The Jazz Beatles, Miroslav Vitous & John Abercrombie, and Charlie Haden & John Scofield.

The festival draws audiences of 70,000, with an average of 2,500 people per concert. It is run as a non-profit organization and enjoys the support of the Municipality of Eilat, the Ministries of Culture and Tourism, the Eilat Hotel Association and various business sponsors.

In 2008, Israeli jazz bassist Avishai Cohen was named artistic director, replacing Dan Gottfried, who initiated the festival and served as artistic director for 22 years. During his tenure Gottfried has showcased over 1500 world-famous Jazz artists and established the reputation of the festival as one of the leading Jazz events worldwide. Under Cohen's direction in 2009, the festival showcased young talent and original compositions along with world-renowned jazz artists.

The festival is held in November.

A 3-day Winter Jazz Festival, held on the third weekend in January, was initiated in 2010.

== Notable artists ==
=== 2006 ===
- Mory Kante
- Gonzalo Rubalcaba
- Suthukazi Arosi
- Latin Groove Orquestra
- The Mingus Dynasty
- Rick Margitza
- Franck Amsalem

=== 2007 ===
- Tomasz Stanko
- Chris Potter
- Incognito
- Sara Lazarus
- Steps Ahead
- Conrad Herwig
- Joey DeFrancesco

=== 2008 ===
- Randy Brecker
- Bill Evans
- Kurt Elling
- Carla Bley
- Mike Stern
- Richard Bona
- Ben Riley
- Oregon
- Terri Lyne Carrington
- John Fedchock
- Omar Sosa
- Zbigniew Namyslowski
- Avishai Cohen

=== 2009 ===
- Dee Dee Bridgewater
- John Scofield
- Eli Degibri
- Rob Ickes
- Paquito D'Rivera
- Lionel Loueke
- Jean-Michel Pilc
- Chano Domínguez
- Kurt Rosenwinkel

Israeli jazz acts included:

- The Apples
- Funk'n'Stein
- Amos Hoffman
- Marina Maximilian Blumin

=== 2010 ===
- Rickie Lee Jones
- Dave Weckl
- Gary Burton
- Nikki Yanofsky
- Jeff Watts
- Hermeto Pascoal
- Dave Douglas
- Stefon Harris

Israeli acts included:

- Berry Sakharof
- Marsh Dondurama
- Ofer Ganor

=== 2011 ===
- Avishai Cohen
- Michael Kaeshammer
- Steve Smith
- Grégoire Maret
- Gretchen Parlato
- Assaf Avidan

Israeli acts included Yael Deckelbaum, Yoni Rechter, and Zohar Fresko, among others.

=== 2012 ===
- Christian McBride
- Carmen Souza
- Richard Bona
- Sean Jones
- YES! trio (Aaron Goldberg, Omer Avital, and Ali Jackson)
- Minvielle/Suarez/Dufour trio
- Gilad Hekselman
- Geri Allen
- Kenny Garrett

Israeli acts included:

- Karen Malka
- Tomer Bar Trio
- Dudu Tassa
- Daniel Ori
- Yuval Cohen, among others

=== 2013 ===
- Al Foster
- Antonio Sánchez
- Nicholas Payton
- Gerald Clayton
- Jeff Ballard
- João Bosco
- Motion Trio

Israeli acts included Ester Rada, Tatran and Tammy Scheffer among others.

=== 2014 ===
- Fred Hersch
- Antoine Roney
- Dayna Stephens
- Lee Konitz
- Leny Andrade
- Dr. Lonnie Smith
- Dave Douglas & Uri Caine

Israeli Acts included Marina Maximilian, Omer Avital and Ofri Nehemya among others.

== See also ==
- Culture of Israel
- Music of Israel
