= Ktzat Acheret =

Israeli band

Ktzat Acheret or Ketzat Aheret (Hebrew: קצת אחרת, A Little Different) was an Israeli progressive rock band that existed between 1974–75. The band comprised Shlomo Gronich, Shem Tov Levi and Shlomo Idov. Ktzat Acheret is also the name of the only album that the band released.

"Ktzat Acheret" began as a group accompanying Nurit Galron at the beginning of her musical career. After an independent show, the trio began a show trip around the country with songs that they wrote.

The unique and original sound of the group, that was one of the unique progressive rock band considered in the country for that period, was being heard from Israeli musicians, but didn't succeed commercially. The lack of commercial success led to the dissolution of the band. Shlomo Gronich left Israel to seek a career outside the country and study music in New York City.

== The album ==
Before the dissolution of the band, Ktzat Acheret successfully completed the recording of their self-titled debut album, their sole released recording as a band. The arrangements for strings and bassoon were performed by Gronich and Levi. The original album featured twelve tracks. The opening track, "Traveling" (In Hebrew: שיר הנסיעה) documented the trio's experiences on their concert tour throughout Israel. Other tracks of the album that would eventually receive great acclaim include "The Little Prince" (In Hebrew: הנסיך הקטן), "Pink Skies" (In Hebrew: שיר בין ערביים), "Two Chinese" (In Hebrew: שניים סינים) and the album's closing song "Bissalad" (In Hebrew: ביסלט), referring to the songs of the Beatles and acting as a tribute to the band, highly revered by the three.

The album was recorded in Triton Studios in Bnei Brak. Its packaging was designed by Joseph Orbach.

No.	Title	Writer(s)	Length
1.	"Travelling / שיר הנסיעה"	Shlomo Yidov	3:12
2.	"Guru / גורו"	Shlomo Gronich	4:35
3.	"The Little Prince / הנסיך הקטן"	Yehonatan Geffen	2:43
4.	"Shemi's Piece / קטע שמי"		4:07
5.	"Pink Skies / שיר בין ערביים"	Yehonatan Geffen	4:33
6.	"Spring"		2:06
7.	"Two Chinese / שניים סינים"	National	3:46
8.	"Quinta / קווינטה"		4:21
9.	"The Echo / ההד"	Leah Goldberg	3:12
10.	"204"		5:18
11.	"Sweet Song / שיר מתוק"		3:32
12.	"Bissalad / ביסלט"	Ktzat Acheret	1:42
Total length:			43:07
