= Shwartz =

Shwartz is a surname. Notable people with the surname include:

- Susan Shwartz (born 1949), American author
- Patty Shwartz (born 1961), American judge
- Ofir Shwartz (born 1979), Israeli jazz pianist, composer, arranger, and record producer
- Benjamin Shwartz (born 1979), American-Israeli conductor
