= Shenhav =

Shenhav (Hebrew: שנהב) is a Hebrew surname. Notable people with the surname include:

- Dina Shenhav (born 1968) Israeli artist
- Haya Shenhav (born 1936), Israeli children's and adults' books writer
- Yehouda Shenhav (born 1952), Israeli sociologist and critical theorist

== Fictional characters ==
- Shenhav family from The Cops (Israeli TV series)
