= Pillar of Fire (TV series) =

- A Television mini series documentary on the History of Zionism and Israel's Rebirth
- Also known as: Amud Ha'Esh
- Hebrew: עמוד האש
- Genre: Documentary
- Created by: Israel Broadcasting Authority (IBA)
- Voices of: Yossi Banai (Hebrew); Ian McKellen (English)
- Theme music composer: Shem Tov Levi
- Country of origin: Israel
- Original languages: Hebrew; English
- No. of seasons: 1
- No. of episodes: 19 (Hebrew); 7 (English)

Production
- Producer: Yaakov Eisenmann
- Editor: Yigal Loussin
- Running time: 855 minutes (Hebrew); 420 minutes (English)

Original release
- Network: Israeli Channel 1

Related
- Tekuma

Pillar of Fire (Hebrew: עמוד האש, or Amud Ha'Esh) is a documentary television series of the Israel Broadcasting Authority (IBA), named after the Pillar of Fire, the biblical phenomena which led the ancient Israelites to the Promised Land during their exodus from Egypt. It was produced by Yaakov Eisenmann and edited by Yigal Loussin and presents the History and narrative of Zionism from the late 19th century until the establishment of the state of Israel in 1948. It first aired during the winter and spring of 1981 on Israeli Channel 1 over a period of five months, and attracted its biggest rating at the time. It was later broadcast on CUNY TV in the United States in 1988 in English narrated by Ian McKellen and it was announced by the German Minister of State to be aired as part of wide array of events to mark Israel's 60th Independence Day (Yom Ha'atzmaut). It is still being re-aired at times, on the Israeli History Channel through the Israeli cable TV and satellite television providers, Hot and yes. In 2008, IBA has begun uploading the Pillar of Fire episodes to its official website in honor of Israel's 60th Independence Day, and in the same year The complete series was released to DVD and in English.

Pillar of Fire focuses on the History of Zionism, beginning in 1896, in the wake of Theodor Herzl's revival of the concept of Jewish nationalism and continues to follow the Jewish People in the 20th century, the early stages of Zionism, followed by the waves of Aliyah prior to the founding of Israel, the Revival of the Hebrew language, the Ottoman Empire's rule in over the Land of Israel, the British Mandate, Anti-Semitism in Europe, the rise of Nazism and The Holocaust, the history of the Yishuv, the Jewish struggle for independence, and ends in 1948, with the Israeli Declaration of Independence.

Pillar of Fire is considered one of the biggest productions ever undertaken on Israeli Television. Large budgets were invested in it and the cast worked on its production over a period of five years, from 1976, and with the supervision of five historians. The idea to produce an Israeli documented series on Zionism came up in the aftermath of the Yom Kippur War and the United Nations General Assembly Resolution 3379 in 1975, which compared Zionism to Racism. The Editor, Yigal Loussin, in the introduction to the book of Pillar of Fire, explains: "And then the need to explain to the world, what Zionism is, arose. Actually, the need to explain this to ourselves also became clear". Pillar of Fire is based on a large number of documentary archival footages as well as interviews with 250 persons from Israel and around the world, including, Anwar Sadat, Abba Eban, Golda Meir, Menachem Begin, holocaust survivors and more.

Pillar of Fire was released in Hebrew and English versions. The narrator of the Hebrew version was Israeli Performer Yossi Banai and the English version was read by the English stage and screen actor Ian McKellen. The original film score music was composed, arranged, and conducted by the Israeli singer, music producer, and composer, Shem Tov Levi. The first episode was also broadcast on Russian Television after the fall of Communism.

In 1998, Israeli Channel 1 produced an additional documentary series, Tkumah (also known as Tekuma or "Revival"), that practically picked up from where Pillar of Fire has stopped, and introduces the Israeli narrative of the History of the State of Israel, beginning from the Israeli Declaration of Independence, in 1948, and ends with the Assassination of Israeli Prime Minister Yitzhak Rabin in 1995.

In April 2023, Kan 11 released a recolored version of episode 7 of Pillar of Fire as a special project for Israel's 75th independence.

== Episodes ==
Pillar of Fire — the Jewish people’s return to Zion from 1896 to 1948 (English Version).

Episode 1 — The Jew Returns – The Arab Awakens 1895–1920
Theodor Herzl strives for the creation of a Jewish state.
Episode 2 — The Dream 1914–1929
The Halutzim (pioneers) who arrive in Palestine in the early 1920s build upon the utopian ideas of kibbutzim and cooperative settlements.
Episode 3 — The Rise and Fall of German Jews 1919–1937
The rise to power of Hitler and thousands of Jews immigrate to Palestine.
Episode 4 — Who’s Afraid of a Jewish State? 1937–1939
The British Chamberlain Government abolishes the Partition Plan and issues an anti-Zionist White Paper.
Episode 5 — Holocaust 1939–1945
Thousands of Palestinian Jews volunteer to serve in the British army.
Episode 6 — Exodus 1945–1947
Jewish underground organizations unite in an armed struggle against British Mandate power.
Episode 7 — A Nation Reborn 1947–1948
The Jews lift the siege of Jerusalem.

- The English version has 7 episodes (420 minutes).
- The Hebrew version has 19 episodes (855 minutes).
