= Alon Eder =

Israeli singer

Alon Eder אלון עדר
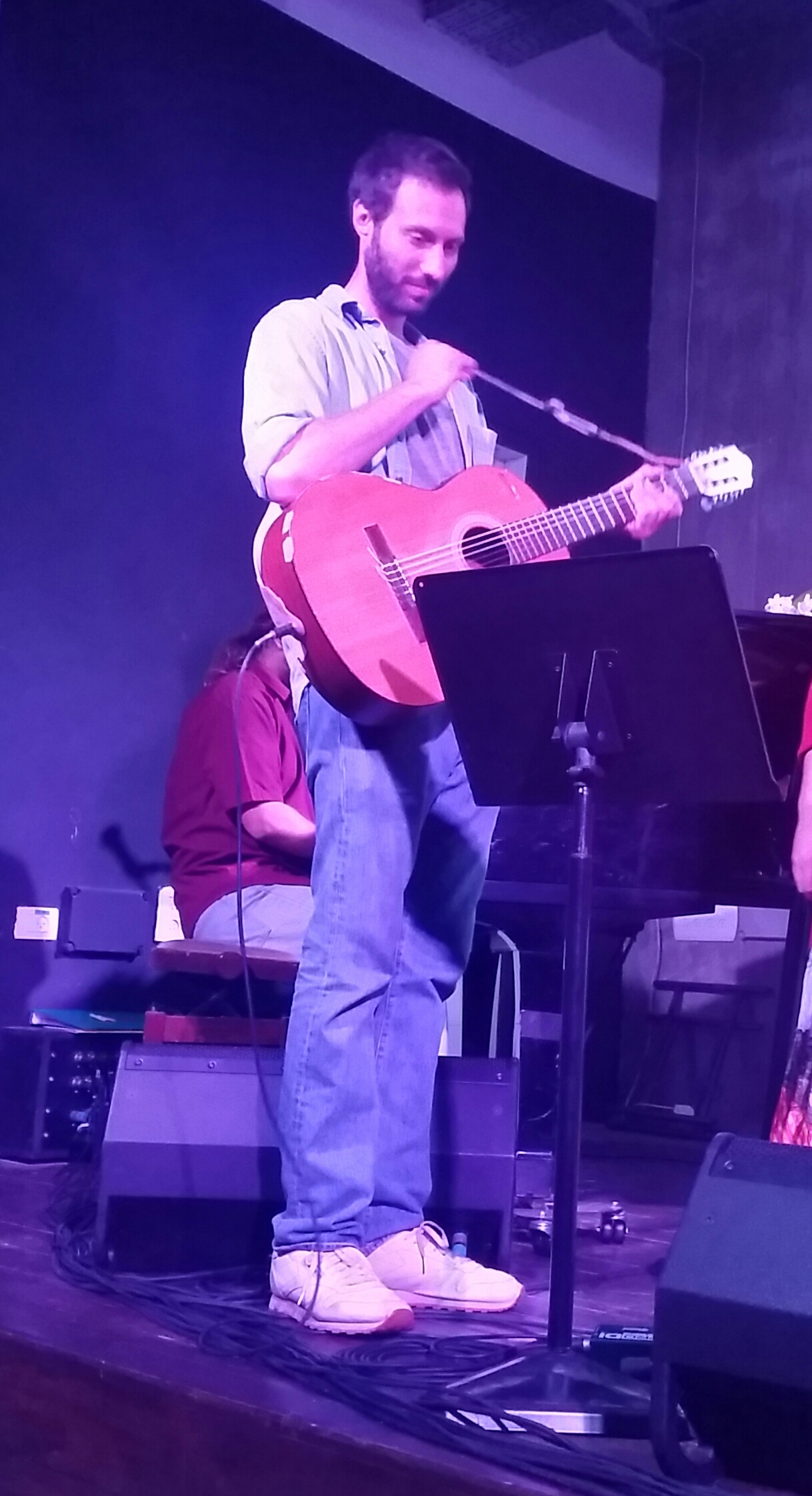
- Eder in 2017

Background information
- Birth name: Alon Eder
- Born: 8 July 1983 (age 41); Tel Aviv, Israel
- Genres: indie rock; progressive rock; pop
- Occupation(s): Singer-songwriter, musician
- Years active: 2011–present
- Labels: Helicon
- Website: www.aloneder.com

Alon Eder (Hebrew: אלון עדר; born 8 July 1983), is an Israeli singer-songwriter and musician.

== Early life ==
He was born in Tel Aviv in Israel in 1983 to parents Miki Kam, an actress, and Yehuda Eder, a musician.

He studied at the Tel Aviv School of Arts for elementary and middle school. He then studied at the Open Democratic School in Jaffa in grades 10–11. He transferred to Alon High School in Ramat HaSharon for grade 12, majoring in music.

As a conscript in the Israel Defense Forces, he served with the Israeli military ensembles.

== Career ==
His debut album, "Alon Eder", was released in February 2011 as a self-release and contained 15 songs that he composed, arranged and produced. Eight of the songs are poems adapted into songs. In December of the same year, his second album, "Alon Eder and Band", was released, which included 13 songs, most of which he wrote and all of which he composed. In 2012, the mini-album "Dirty Casio" was released, which included six songs he wrote and composed on the "Casio" organ. Unlike his previous albums, the texts in this album are of a social-protest nature.

In September 2014, the album "Summary of Life Until Now" was released by Alon Eder and Band. The band members also participated in writing and performing parts of the album. Compared to the previous albums of Ader and Haka, a greater use of electronic instruments is evident. In November 2014, he collaborated on a new single, How Can You Not (איך אפשר שלא), with the Israeli band, Jane Bordeaux.

In 2015, he released another album called "Casio Rage", like its predecessor, was based on playing Casio organs and included protest songs.

In January 2017, Eder's sixth album, "The Conservatives are back in fashion", was released. The album was preceded by the singles "A lot to say", "Don't leave me" and "Shir Lama", which was a success on radio stations.

In November 2018, Adar's seventh album, "Integrating in the Landscape", was released, which is the fourth created as part of the collaboration with the band. . Two weeks after the release of the album, the band released another album, "Thoughts on the Way". In the same year, Eder and his partner Shani Gabai wrote the rock opera "Rubi Ge Behash".

In October 2019, Eder's ninth album, "Skitzot 1", was released, a solo album that focuses on Eder's personal sketches from 2004 to 2019. At the end of 2020, the album "Sherim Tefilila" was released, which is a composed and sung version of the successful children's book "Tefilila" . Eder composed and performed the song "All the Children in the World" on the album, and also sang with Ester Rada on the song "Mangina Mochas" composed by Yoni Rechter, and participated in the performance of the theme song "Zaman Tefilila" composed by Guy Maroz.

In 2021, Eder collaborated with Jane Bordeaux again for a new single, Mashehu Tipshi (Cover of “Somethin' Stupid” by Frank & Nancy Sinatra).

In June 2021, "Bakol Gadol", the first single from the new album by Alon and the band, was released. In October 2021, the second single, "The Golden Road", was released, with the participation of a choir and all the band members. In December 2021, another single was released with the participation of Chava Alberstein called "You have no right to pardon in the world", written by Leah Goldberg. In February 2022, Edar's tenth album, "Yes Yes Yes Yes!", was released. The single "Moving in a Gaze", which was written and composed by Eder, received positive reviews and received significant radio play after it entered the Galgalatz playlist. In July 2022, Edar released an album in collaboration with Tomer Yeshayahu called "TV Sugar".

In 2022 he composed the soundtrack for the movie "My Fat Friend" together with Tzachi Sadan.

On August 20, 2023, he released the single "Abel Ahava" together with Miri Mesika, which was written by Assi Dayan. Mesika and Edar composed the song and it is the second single from a new concept album consisting entirely of Dayan's texts and letters. Edar composed most of the album's songs. In the same month, he collaborated with Yishai and Michael Suisa on the track "All Broken" from their album, Bunk Bed.

== Personal life ==
He was previously married to the filmmaker Shani Eder Gabai, before separating in 2021. They have three children together.

He lives in Pardes Hanna-Karkur.

== See also ==
- Music of Israel
- List of Jewish musicians
