= Miki Kam =

Israeli actress

- מיקי קם
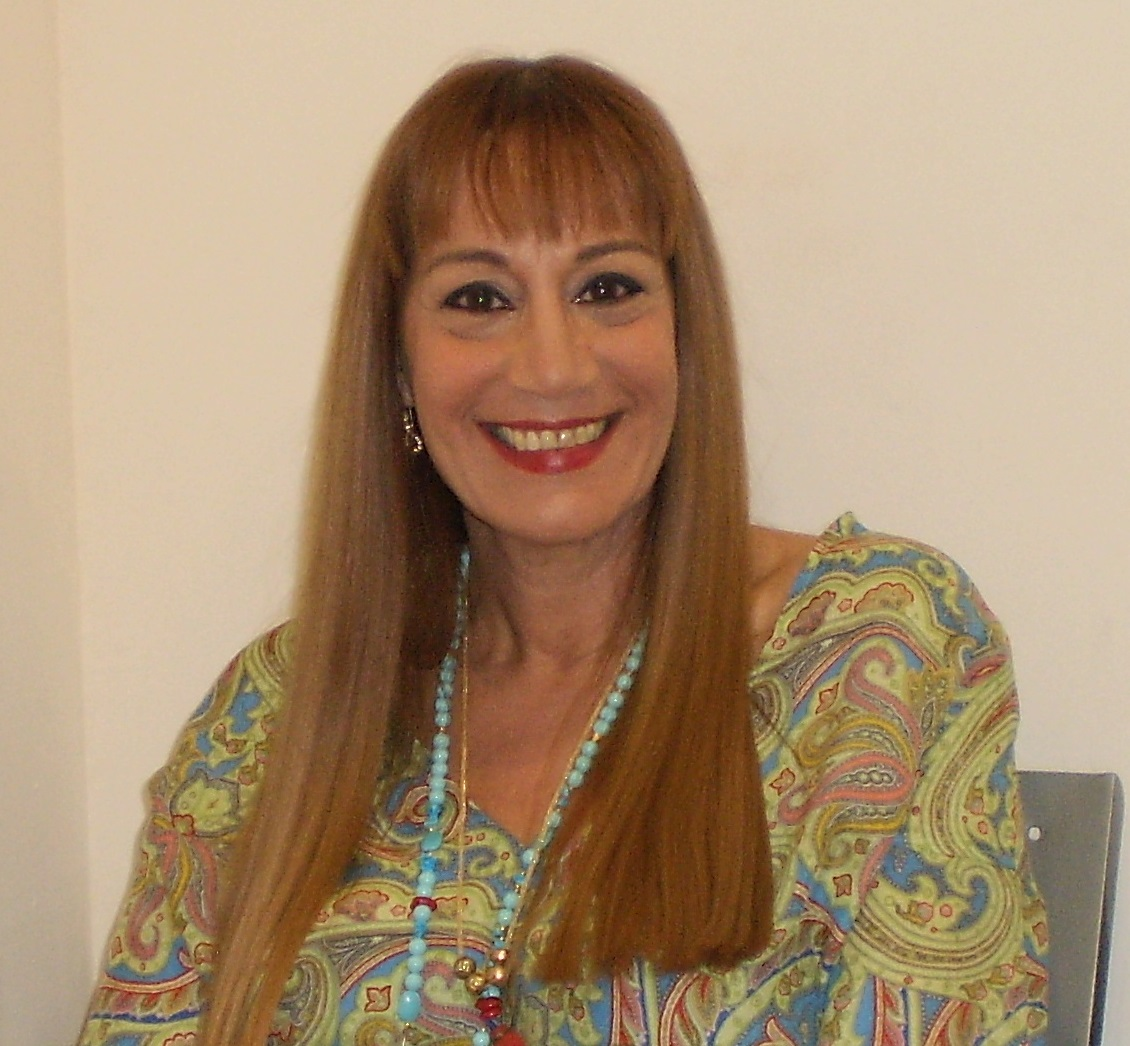
- Born: 17 June 1955 (age 70); Manara, Israel
- Occupations: Actress; voice actress; comedian; singer
- Years active: 1973–present
- Spouse: Yehuda Eder
- Children: 2, including Alon Eder

Miki Kam (Hebrew: מיקי קם; born 17 June 1955) is an Israeli actress, comedian, dubber and singer. She is known for her roles in Ha-Shminiya (2005), Giv'at Halfon Eina Ona (1976) and Sublet (2020).

== Biography ==
Kam was born on 17 June 1955, in Kibbutz Manara in northern Israel. Kam grew up in Tel Aviv and studied in the youth village HaKfar HaYarok from age 15 until her military service.

In her military service she served in the Nahal military ensemble, where she had her own comedy show. There, she met her husband Yehuda Eder. Eder is now the president of Rimon school of music.

In 1976, she hosted the "Hebrew Song Celebration" that replaced the traditional "Israel Song Festival".

In theater, Kam was a part of many famous theater troupes including Habima Theatre, Cameri Theatre, Jerusalem Khan Theatre. She starred in dozens musicals including Cabaret, Twelfth Night, Ghetto, Fiddler on the Roof, Billy Schwartz and more. She was also part of many children's theater musicals like Hansel and Gretel, Pippi Longstocking, Anne of Green Gables and more.

In 1987, she competed in the Kdam Eurovision, the Israeli national preselection of the Eurovision Song Contest. She competed with the song "Kazino olami" (קזינו עולמי) and secured the 3rd place.

In cinema, Kam starred in the Israeli movies: Giv'at Halfon Eina Ona, A Movie and a Breakfast, (he), Late Summer Blues, Leylasede (he), Little Heros (he) and Kicking Out Shoshana.

On television, she appeared in several TV shows, the most famous being Ha-Shminiya, Bnot HaZahav, and Shtisel. She also made many guest appearances in various shows and participated in the reality show Rokdim Im Kokhavim.

In children's television, Kam appeared in many shows like Rechov Sumsum, Mesibat Gan and two videotapes for child audiences.

As a dubbing actress, she provided the Hebrew version for many animations, including The Littl' Bits, Anastasia, The Magic School Bus, Spider-Woman, Encanto and more.

== Personal life ==
Today, Kam lives in Tel Aviv and is married to Eder. They have 2 children (one of them is Alon Eder) and grandchildren.

== Awards ==
Year	Award	Category	Nominated work	Results	Ref.
2011	Israeli Theater Prize	Best Supporting Actress	Cabaret	Nominated	
2015	Israeli Theater Prize	Best Supporting Actress	Billy Schwartz	Won	
2020	Awards of the Israeli Television Academy	Best Supporting Actress in a Drama Series	Shtisel	Won	
2022	Israeli Union of Performing Artists	Lifetime Achievement Award		Yes	
