= Electrowavez =

Arab psychedelic trance group

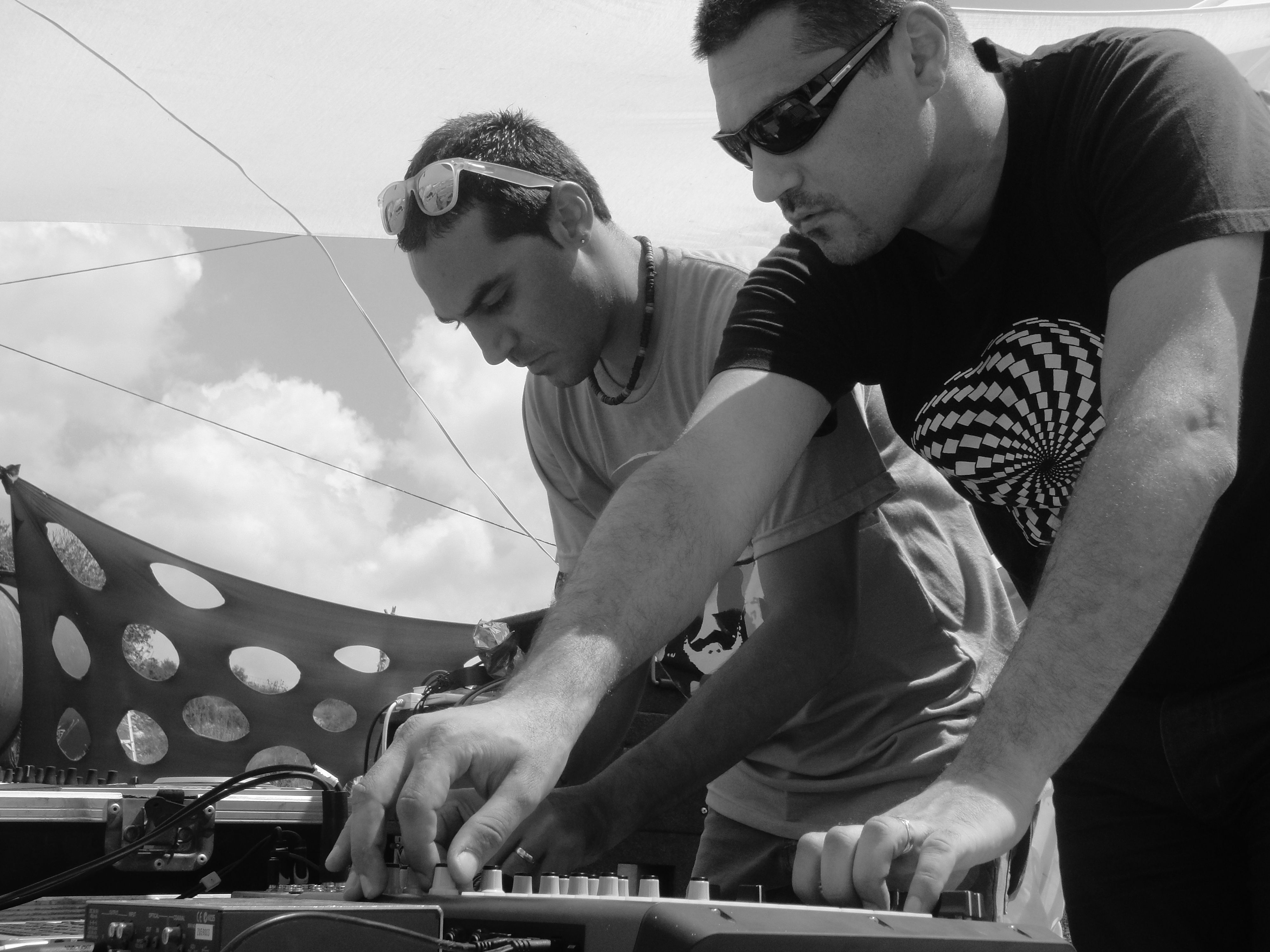

Background information
- Origin: Acre, Israel
- Genres: Psytrance, electronic, dubstep, electro house
- Years active: 2008–present
- Labels: Merkaba Music, H2O Records, Soul Shift Music, Wavez Records
- Members: Charlie shaabi Richard Savo
- Past members: Ghassan Birumi
- Website: http://www.electrowavez.com

Electrowavez is an Arab psychedelic trance group formed in 2008, comprising two members, the brothers Charlie Shaabi and Richard Savo.

Ayahuasca
Ayahuasca from Za3tar Album

== Musical career ==
=== (2008–2010) ===
Electrowavez is a duo of music producers, consisting of brothers Charlie Shaabi and Richard Savo from Acre. They began producing electronic music in 2008. Electrowavez' first appearance was in February 2009 with the release of "Kano Ya Habibi", an electro remix of the Lebanese singer Fairuz. The release reached the top chart position on Arabil, a local radio station. Electrowavez's electro house second single, "Give Me My Freedom", was officially released by Soul Shift Music in September 2009. The duo used a short sample of Oum Kalthoum- "Al Atlal", an Arabic poem that reflects one of the major themes of Arabic poetry.

=== Brainstorm (2010–2012) ===
In May 2010, Electrowavez released their debut album, "Brainstorm". Eleven tracks were composed and written over the course of two years, combining electro house music genre with Arabic instrumentation and melodies. A collaboration between Richard Savo & Angelina Zbedat, "Sababa" was the first single released in May 2010, and it peaked at the number 1 position on the chart on the Israeli radio station Arbil-an. This single appeared was on the Israeli TV show "Haravak", an adaptation of (The Bachelor) in July 2013. In September 2010, Electrowavez released "Barcode" with featured guest vocalist Walid el Hilou. Angelina Zbedat performed solo vocals on the single "My Life", released in January 2011.

=== Dubooster (2012) ===
Electrowavez released their "Dubooster" EP in March 2012, intended as a five track dubstep side project. All five tracks are listed in Miles of Musik catalogue.

=== Za3tar (2013) ===
The band's 2013 album, "Za3tar", was released on 3 July 2013. It features tracks influenced by psychedelic trance, Goa trance and dubstep genres. This album contains heavily influences from the psytrance subgenre and has different rhythm combinations. The success of the album conceded with the growing popularity of the psychedelic music scene among the Arab community in Israel. The album was entitled "Za3tar" or "Za'atar" after a popular Middle Eastern herb that carries many benefits.

=== Elemental (2018) ===
"Elemental", released on April 18, 2018, by the group Electrowavez through the renowned label "Merkaba Music", showcases an innovative blend of ambient, glitch-hop, downtempo, electronic, psybient, and ethnic influences. Created by Charlie Shaabi and Richard Savo, the album represents a fusion of musical cultures, each symbolized by a natural element, which inspired the title. This concept-driven album became the group's most successful release, receiving significant radio coverage and international acclaim. Collaborations with global artists followed, highlighting Electrowavez's impact within the electronic music scene.

== Discography ==
=== Albums ===
- Brainstorm (2010)
- Za3tar (2013)
- Ayahuasca (The Remixes) (2014)
- Elemental (2018)

=== Singles/EPs ===
- Yalla (Dj Chuck Remix) (2009)
- Give Me My Freedom (2009)
- Dubooster EP (2012)
- Blaze Up Di Fun (2012)
- Boomerang EP 5 May (2014)
- On This Land EP 28 Feb (2016)
- Jungleground 14 Feb (2017)

=== Compilations ===
- Various Artists: Soul Shift Music, Vol. 1 (2011)
- Various Artists: Progressive Decision, Vol. 04 (2011)

== Members ==
Current members

- Charlie Shaabi – keyboards, drum machine, programming (2008–present)
- Richard Savo – keyboards, synthesizers, vocals (2008–present)

Former members

- Ghassan Birumi – Oud, percussions (2010–2011)
