= Raphael Nathan =

Israeli content creator, DJ and dancer

DJ Raphi
- רפאל נתן
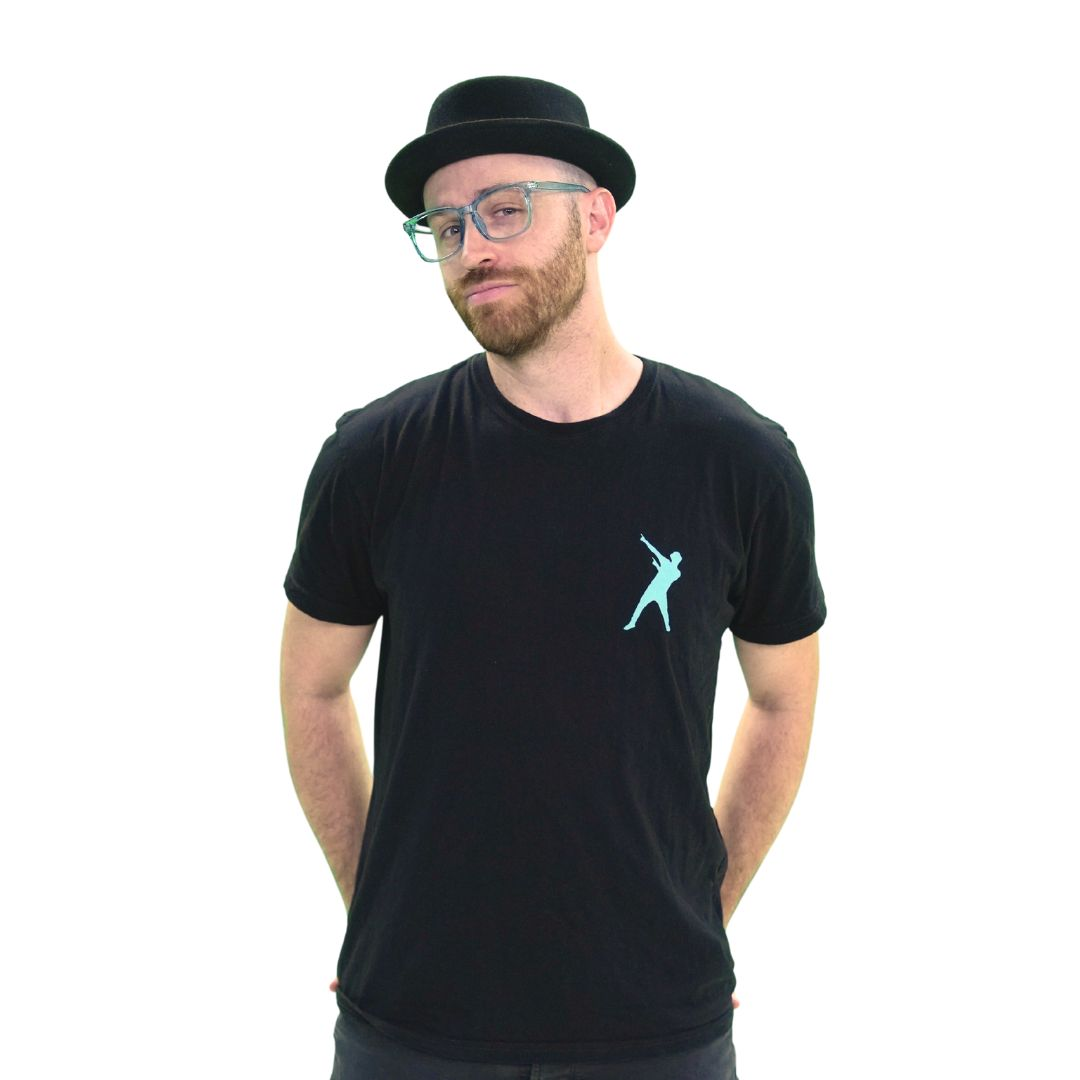
- Born: Raphael Nathan; February 27, 1990 (age 36); Johannesburg, South Africa
- Other name: DJ Four Eyez
- Education: Ono Academic College
- Occupations: Content Creator; Recording Artist; DJ; Dancer; Beatboxer
- Awards: Israeli National Beatboxing Championship (2007); Israeli National Breakdancing Championship (2011, 2012); Red Rocks "Piece of the Rock" commemorative award

YouTube information
- Channel: DJ Raphi
- Genres: Kids Content; Educational; EDM; Tech House
- Subscribers: 1.61 million
- Views: 1,048,618,751
- Last updated: July 7, 2026
- Website: djraphi.com

Raphael Nathan (Hebrew: רפאל נתן; February 27, 1990), known professionally as DJ Raphi is an Israeli content creator, recording artist, DJ, dancer and beatboxer.

He has achieved popularity on YouTube, where his dance music videos have surpassed 1 billion views.

== Early life ==
Raphael Nathan was born in Johannesburg, South Africa, son of musician Mickey Nathan, and Naomi, editor and teacher at King David Schools He immigrated to Israel with his family in 1998. They settled in Ra'anana. His mother died in a traffic accident in 2022. Nathan had difficulties with learning the language and suffered from bullying at school. He began taking drum lessons at the age of 10. Since he did not have his own drum kit to practice on at the time, he started developing his rhythmic ability by doing beatboxing.

Since the age of 16, he also trained as a breakdancer. He then went on to win the Israeli National Beatboxing Championship in 2007. In 2010 he participated in a breakdance video on the occasion of the celebration of Purim.

== Career ==
Nathan co-founded the Kosher Flava crew which went on to win the Israeli Street Festival breakdance competition in 2011 and 2012. The Kosher Flava crew represented Israel at the Battle of the Year in France, at Notorious IBE festival in the Netherlands, and at the DOYOBE International Hip Hop Festival in Salzburg.

In 2013, Nathan co-founded Kippalive, an acappella group. The group appeared on The X Factor Israel reality show. Kippalive went on to achieve online popularity with a series of viral videos that feature versions of pop songs reworked to reference Jewish themes.

In 2015, Nathan began creating content on YouTube under the name DJ Raphi. In March 2020, during the COVID-19 pandemic, his video "The Cha Cha Slide Dance" had an extraordinary impact, surpassing 125 million plays.

Nathan has received accounts from families and hospital staff who used his videos to support children undergoing medical treatment.

In the year 2021, DJ Raphi was featured in the Jewish Festival Tzama, where he introduced his dance instruction videos to the orthodox Jewish community. Tzama is known as the biggest Jewish Music festival with singers such as Ishay Ribo, Avraham Fried and Nathan Goshen.

In September 2024, he produced and released a new dance video to the song "Nekudot" alongside musician Shmuel Perednik, who wrote the song, presenting it as "a moment of light in the context of the war".

Despite facing social media backlash, particularly after October 7 attacks, Nathan said he has many followers in Muslim countries and that he has focused less on conflict and more on shared dancing. In another interview, he stated that Muslim countries account for 20% of his audience.

In April 2025, he reached 1 million subscribers on YouTube. By June 2026, DJ Raphi's channel had surpassed 1 billion cumulative YouTube views.

In March 2026, he undertook his own headline tour, the "2026 USA Hype Tour," performing in nine U.S. states, including stops in Chicago, Philadelphia, New York, Houston, and Fort Lauderdale.

Nathan does not perform on Shabbat.

Nathan performed at the Red Rocks Amphitheatre in Morrison, Colorado, as part of "Family Rave on the Rocks," alongside headlining Australian musician Lenny Pearce. The show, held on June 14, sold out with an audience of approximately 9,000. During the event, DJ Raphi signed the venue's artist tunnel, whose past signatories include the Beatles and Led Zeppelin, and received Red Rocks' "Piece of the Rock" commemorative award, an annual keepsake presented by the venue to performers.

In June 2026, Nathan performed at a community event in New Jersey hosted by Nefesh B'Nefesh.

Nathan is represented by global talent manager Rhys Paynting, while his U.S. bookings are handled by Peter Schwartz of WME.

He currently resides in Jerusalem, with his wife and two children.

== Discography ==
=== Singles ===
| Title | Year |
|---|---|
| The Workout | 2026 |
| The Cleaning Song | 2026 |
| Melody | 2026 |
| The Robot Dance | 2026 |
| Fire It Up | 2026 |
| Be You Be Awesome | 2025 |
| If You're Happy and You Know It | 2025 |
| Move It | 2025 |
| Paca Paca | 2025 |
| Googoo Gaga | 2025 |
| The Warm Up | 2025 |
| The Cool Down | 2025 |
| The Floor is Lava | 2024 |
| Row, Row, Row Your Boat | 2024 |
| Superstar | 2024 |
| Limbo | 2024 |
| Happy Birthday | 2024 |
| The DJ Dance | 2024 |
| The DJ Says | 2024 |
| Colors | 2024 |
| Head, Shoulders, Knees & Toes | 2024 |
| Banish Darkness | 2023 |
| Tooth Brushing Dance | 2023 |
| Wheels On The Bus | 2023 |
| Old MacDonald Had a Farm | 2023 |
| The Anti-Bully Dance | 2023 |
| Freeze Dance | 2023 |
| The ABC Song | 2022 |
| Machu Picchu | 2022 |
| Shake It Off | 2022 |
| The Lulav Shake | 2020 |
