= Shem Tov Levi =

Israeli singer

- שם טוב לוי
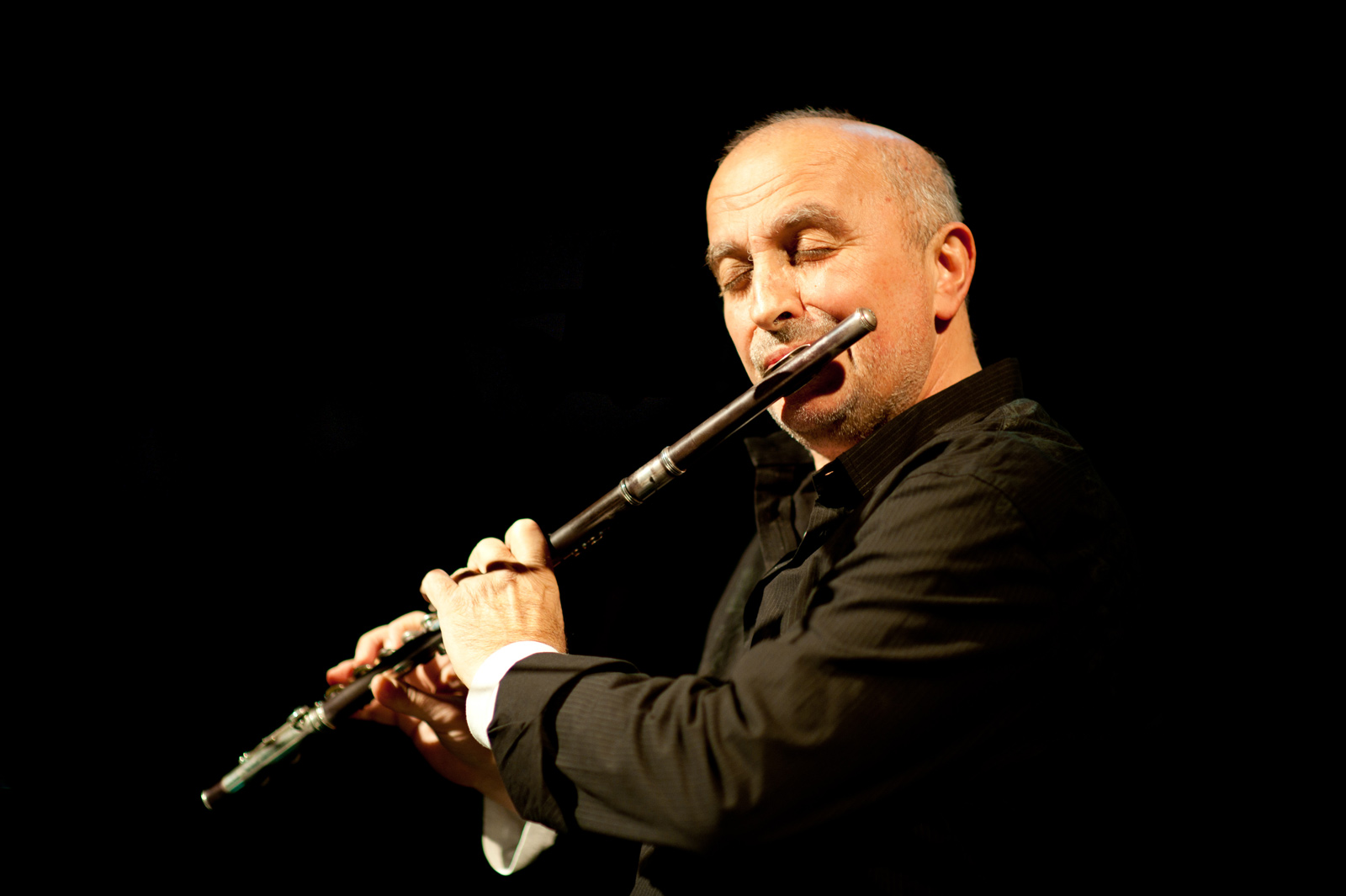
- Shem Tov Levy at Zappa Club Tel Aviv
- Born: 4 February 1950 (age 76); Rehovot, Israel
- Education: Berklee College of Music, Buchmann-Mehta School of Music, Tel Aviv University
- Occupations: Singer; pianist; flautist; composer; producer
- Musical career
- Genres: Progressive, art rock, avant-garde, classical, progressive pop, balkan music, jazz
- Years active: 1969–present

Shem Tov Levi (Hebrew: שם טוב לוי; born 4 February 1950) is an Israeli singer, pianist, flautist, composer and producer. He is one of the most influential musicians in the music culture of Israel.

During his long career, Levy has released solo albums, alongside working with many musicians, including Arik Einstein, Esther Ofarim, Yehudit Ravitz, Rivka Zohar, Arik Sinai, Yitzhak Klepter, Gidi Gov, Ofra Haza, Dikla, Shlomo Gronich.

== Biography ==
Levi served in the Central Command Band, which is where he got his start as a musical artist. He studied at Tel Aviv University and Berklee College of Music in Boston. He started his professional career as a composer, after having written two songs which appeared on Arik Einstein's 1972 album "Jasmine". Later they had collaborative albums together. In the mid-1970s he was a member of the progressive rock group Ktzat Acheret (קצת אחרת, "A Little Different"). In 1976–77 he led the progressive rock group Sheshet, whose members included Yehudit Ravitz; the band released one album, Sheshet (1977).

He has recorded a lot of solo and collaborative albums spanning pop, rock, folk and jazz, as well as leading his own jazz and folk ensemble.
