= Yoshi (Israeli singer) =

Yochai Blomm יושי
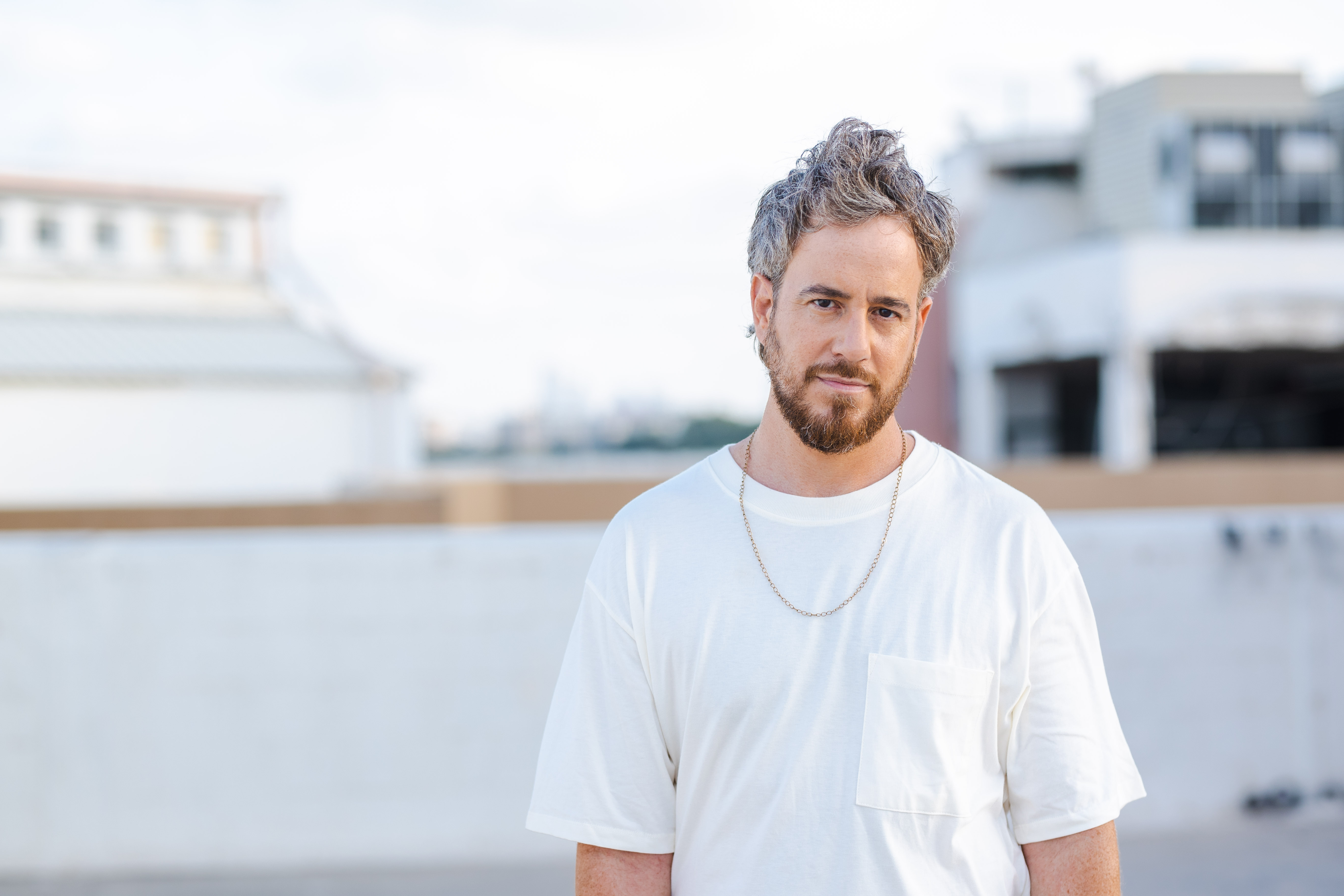

Background information
- Born: 21 September 1983 (age 43); Nof HaGalil
- Genre: pop
- Occupations: Singer and songwriter
- Instruments: Piano, violin,
- Years active: 2019–present

Yochai Blum (Hebrew: יושי; born 21 September 1983), also known by the stage name Yoshi, is an Israeli musician, singer and songwriter.

Blum was born and raised in Nof HaGalil the son of a mother who was a teacher and a father who was a mechanical engineer. He attended ORT Kiryat Hinunchuk High School. Already as a child, he was interested in music and began playing the piano.

After completing his military service in the IDF Education and Youth Corps Band, Blum began to dedicate himself professionally to the field of music. He produced, recorded, and played as a keyboardist with various musicians and ensembles: Muki, Ily Butner and the Foreign Children, Shay Gabso, Rami Kleinstein, Kobi Aflalo, and more. He also worked with Roni Alter, whom he met during his service in the Israel Defense Forces and performed with her playing piano and singing.

In parallel to his work in the field of music, Bloom graduated with honors with a bachelor and master degree in philosophy from Tel Aviv University. After completing both degrees, he was accepted to study medicine at Tel Aviv University and at the same time continued to study music.

After three years of medical school, Bloom decided to drop out to focus on his music career. Approximately four months after leaving school, he finished working on his album. Strangers Know, her debut album, was released in 2021.

The lyrics, compositions and musical production are Bloom, except for two songs that are a collaboration with producer Omri Amado.

The album features ten songs that touch on experiences, relationships, and more about Israel. The songs that make up the album, including "Foreigners Know," "The Most Beautiful," and "To Be a Talker," which was inspired by the story of TV host Eyal Peled, all topped the charts and entered the top ten of Israeli viral songs on the Shazam app. The music video for this song was directed by actor and director Oren Shkedi, who recommended Yoshi to collaborate with photographer Alex Libek. The three collaborated with editor Shahar Amarillo and ultimately created a clip composed entirely of Libek archive footage, after he sought out the appropriate material in his private archive.

One of the women photographed accidentally saw the clip on the Galgalatz website and recognized herself and her twin sister in the photo, which was apparently taken in 1990 on a Tel Aviv seafront, not long after they immigrated to Israel with their family as part of the immigration from the former Soviet Union in the 1990s. She turned to Bloom and added more about her early life.

On 12 February 2024, she released her second album, "A Reminder to Myself." The album was composed of voice recordings from Yoshi cell phone, where she constantly recorded reminders, lines, and melodies. The album creation process involved extracting notes from her phone, which revealed that she had already written an album without realizing it.

On 7 April 2025, he released the song "3 Wishes," the idea for which came from Yoshi's son, who shared what he would wish for if he had three wishes. Yoshi shared the question on social media and received a large number of responses. The songs lyrics were written based on wishes sent to him by his fans, and the public also participated in the production of the single.

== Discography ==
=== Album ===
- 2021: זרים מכירים
- 2024: תזכורת לעצמי
