= Seek Irony =

Israeli modern rock band

Seek Irony סיק איירוני
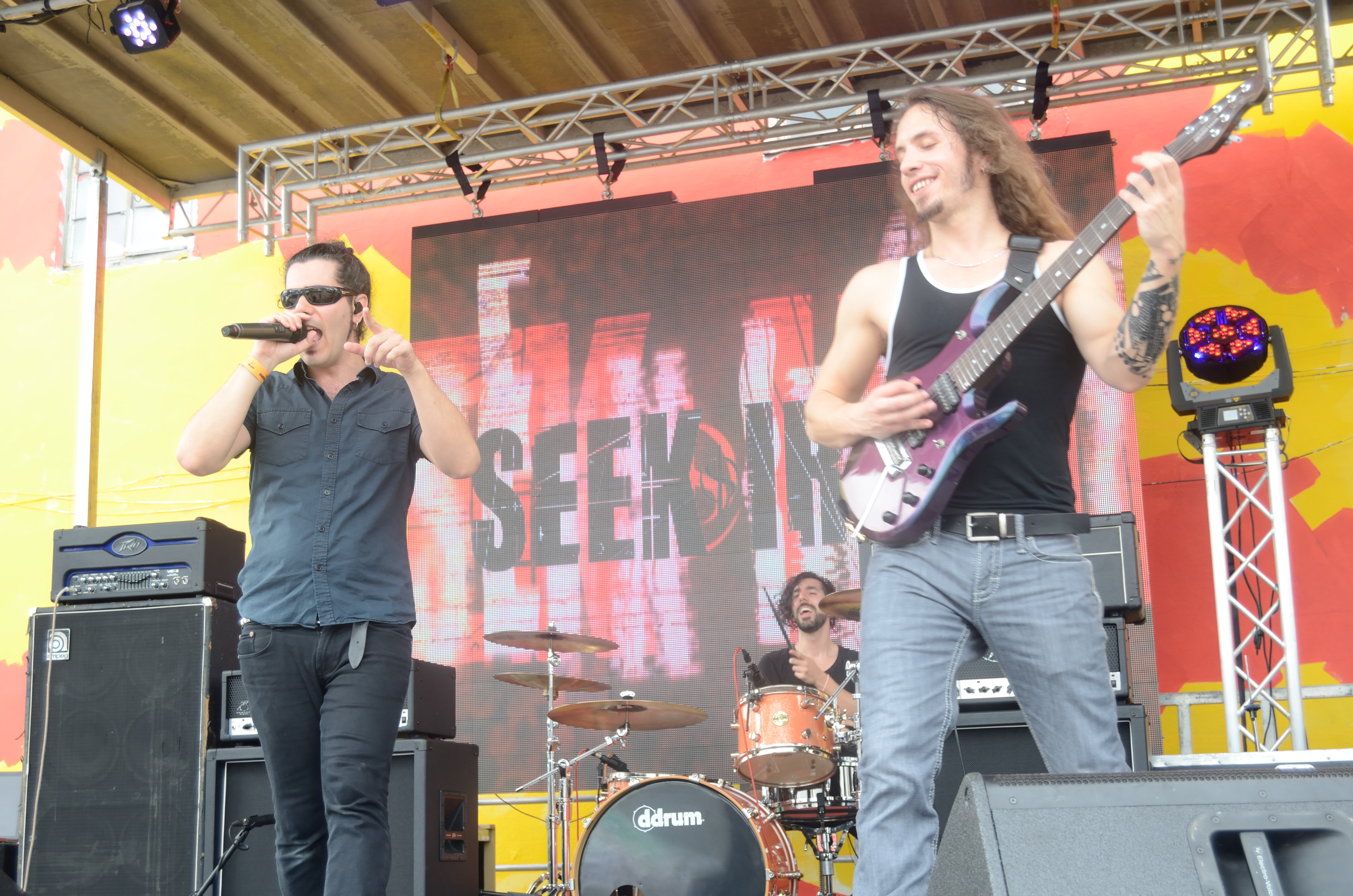
- Seek Irony in 2016

Background information
- Origin: Tel Aviv, Israel
- Years active: 2000-present
- Members: Kfir Gov; Rom Gov; Adam Donovan; Alex Campbell
- Past members: Yoav Volansky; Eran Muntner; Daniel Strosberg
- Website: seekirony.com

Seek Irony (Hebrew: סיק איירוני) is an Israeli modern rock band which was formed in 2000 by brothers Kfir (vocals) and Rom Gov (drums), Yoav Volansky (keyboard and synths) and Eran Muntner (guitar). Daniel Strosberg (bass) joined the band in 2004. The band plays American hard rock music in combination with electronic sounds and beats. Since its inception, the band has gained a devoted following playing at venues world-wide and since moving its base to Austin, Texas, has welcomed new members, Adam Donovan (bass) and Alex Campbell (guitar) to its ranks.

== History ==
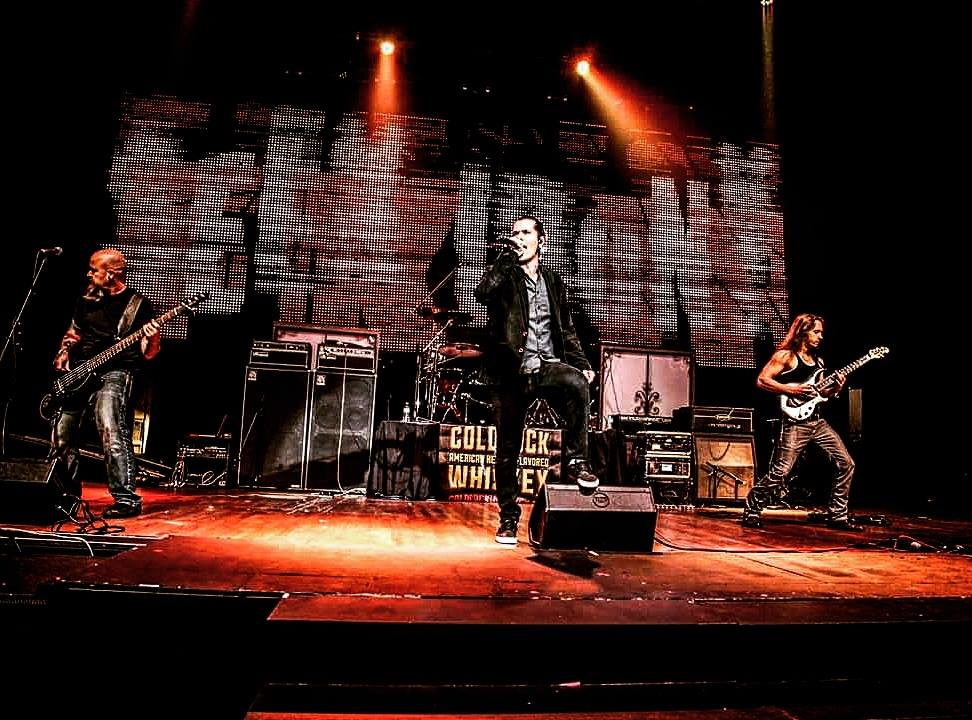
Seek Irony in 2016

Seek Irony was formed in 2000, among others, by brothers Kfir & Rom Gov who stated that writing songs in English was a natural progression for them due to the fact that they spent their childhood studying at American schools as a result of their father being an Israeli diplomat.

In 2004, the band embarked on their first music tour abroad. In 2005, the band signed a recording deal with American producer Sylvia Massy, who works with System of a Down, Red Hot Chili Peppers and Tool, who invited the band to record their album at RadioStar Studios in California. Upon finishing their album in 2006, the band earned publicity in several newspapers and music magazines both in Israel and abroad. In April 2007, their hit "Tech & Roll" was featured in "The Best Damn Sports Show" on the Fox Sports channel.

In 2008 the band signed a recording deal with Aksel Records and released their first single "Everything We Are" which was written in cooperation with a Lebanese singer, Rab Zogiev. Both lead singer Kfir Gov and Rav Zagaiev published blogs on Seek Irony's MySpace page in which they described the events which lead up to their cooperation.

On February 3, 2015, the band released their debut album Tech N' Roll. In 2016, the band received the award for Outstanding Album of the Year at the North American Independent Rock Music Awards.

In 2016 Seek Irony signed a worldwide record deal with UDR/Warner Music (now known as Silver Lining Music), and on September 30, 2016 "Tech N Roll" was rereleased worldwide via the label. In 2020, the band parted ways with their label.

== Music Appearance in Videogames ==
An instrumental version of "Head Above the Water" can be heard in the menu of the DLC of Postal 2, Paradise Lost ( Released on April 14, 2015)

== Musical influences ==
In a 2016 interview, lead singer Kfir Gov, stated that he was influenced by Infected Mushroom, Prodigy, Nine Inch Nails, and Pendulum.

== Discography ==
- Tech N’ Roll (2015)
