= Haya Shenhav =

Israeli author

Haya Shenhav (Hebrew: חיה שנהב; born December 9, 1936) is an Israeli author of stories and poems for both children and adults. She is best known for her children's book Rasberry Juice (Hebrew: מיץ פטל) by Am Oved Publishing (1970). In 1985, Shenhav was awarded the Ze'ev Prize for Children and Youth Literature. In 2004, she was awarded the Bialik Prize for Literature as an acknowledgment of a lifetime's work in children's literature.In 2024 she had another of her works called 100 Rooms illustrated by prominent illustrator Yirmi Pinkus, translated into English and published by Kalaniot Books.

== Biography ==
Shenhav was born in Moshav Kfar Yehoshua in the Jezreel Valley, the daughter of farmers. Her father, Shmuel Dagan, was born and raised in Eastern Poland and immigrated to Mandatory Palestine in 1920 and was one of the founders of the moshav. Her mother, Frida, born in Germany, immigrated to Mandatory Palestine in 1932. Shenhav spent her childhood in the moshav surrounded by animals and agricultural work and acquired her primary education there. Shenhav attended Kiryat Amal-Tivon High School and then studied at the Hebrew University in Jerusalem in Hebrew literature and geology. Shenhav worked at the Geophysical Institute of Israel in petroleum research before focusing her career on writing.

== Works ==
Shenhav's writings focus on children and youth literature, although she has published books of poetry and novels intended for adults. Some of her poems have been made into songs by Yoni Rechter.

Ofra Weingarten narrated an adaptation of Shenhav's story "Flower of the Golden Heart".

Some of her stories became plays. In 1994, a videotape called "Pete, Pet, Too" was produced which included many of Shenhav's songs including the stories "Raspberry Juice". This recording features Irit Inabi, Fazit Noni, Ofer Blum, and Yossi Hamo.

Some of her works are on the list of books recommended by the Israeli Ministry of Education. In 2005, her book "Raspberry Juice" was chosen to be second on the list of the best Israeli children's books.
