= Dan Gottfried =

Israeli jazz pianist and music educator (born 1939)

Dan Gottfried דן גוטפריד
- Born: 1939 (age 86–87)
- Origin: Israel
- Genres: Jazz
- Occupations: Jazz pianist; Music educator
- Instrument: Piano
- Years active: 1960s–present
- Education: Tel Aviv Academy of Music; Hebrew University of Jerusalem (B.A. in Economics)
- Children: Yaron Gottfried
- Awards: Israeli Ministry of Culture prize for lifetime achievements (2007); Jerusalem Academy of Music and Dance Gold Medal (2010); Israeli Ministry of Culture prize for senior artists (2018)

Dan Gottfried (Hebrew: דן גוטפריד; born 1939) is an Israeli jazz pianist and music educator. In 1987 he founded the Red Sea Jazz Festival, which he directed until his retirement in 2008. He is president of the Israeli Musicians Union.

== Biography ==
Dan Gottfried studied piano at the Tel Aviv Academy of Music. In 1959 he won First Prize in the Mozart Piano competition. In 1962 he earned an undergraduate degree in economics at Hebrew University of Jerusalem and went on to study law. He began his career as a classical pianist in the early 1960s. In the 1970s he was one of the founders of the Israeli Jazz Workshop quartet, the group that recorded the first instrumental jazz album in Israel and fused jazz with Jewish and Arab motifs. In 1981 he founded the Jazz Faculty in the Jerusalem Academy of Music and Dance and served as head of the faculty for eight years. In 1985 he founded the Jazz Studies department of the Thelma Yellin Art High School. In 1992 he was commissioned by the Tel Aviv Museum of Art to direct the Jazz Concerts Series at the museum. In 1994 he started the Jazz Series Lectures at the Open University of Israel, a yearly series of ten lectures on the History of Jazz. In 1998 he created the "Jazz at The Opera" concert series at the Tel Aviv Opera House, which he ran until 2004. In 1987 he initiated the Red Sea Jazz Festival in Eilat which he directed artistically for 22 years. Gottfried leads his own Jazz Trio and Quintet, which has been invited by the Israeli Ministry of Foreign Affairs to present Israeli jazz in tours abroad: 1993 Belarus, 1996 Latvia, 1998 India, 2004 Italy. He has performed with many jazz greats, including Dizzy Gillespie, Benny Golson, Frank Foster, Sam Rivers, Niels-Henning Ørsted Pedersen, Randy Brecker, Von Freeman, Johnny Frigo, Franz Jackson, Clark Terry, Major Holley, Jaroslav Jakubovič, Ronnie Cuber, Sheila Jordan, Georgie Fame, Mark Murphy, Kevin Mahogany, Jean Loup L'ongnon and Gyula Babos.

Gottfried serves currently as president of the Israeli Musicians' Union and general manager of the Israeli Musicians' Collecting Society.

Gottfried's son, Yaron Gottfried, is a noted conductor, composer, and pianist.

== Awards ==
In 2007 Gottfried received the Israeli Ministry of Culture prize for lifetime achievements in the field of jazz. In 2010 he was honored by the Jerusalem Academy of Music and Dance and received its Gold Medal. In 2018 he was awarded Israeli Ministry of Culture prize for senior artists, for his long years of contributing to the musical scene of Israel.
