= Shefi Yishai =

Israeli musician

Shefi Yishai שפי ישי

Background information
- Born: December 23, 1954 (age 71); Jerusalem
- Occupation: singer-songwriter
- Years active: 1986–2010

Shefi Yishai (Hebrew: שפי ישי) is an Israeli composer and musical director for theater.

Yishai has released two solo albums: "Love and Hate" and is touring with the music on the albums. He worked on albums by David Broza and Yehuda Poliker as a session musician and producer and has performed with other musicians.

== Works ==
=== Albums ===
- 1986: "Under the Closet", based on poems for children by Anda Amir Pinkerfeld, composed by Yishai and performed by Yehudit Tamir, Moti Dichne, Ya'akov Banai and Yishai.
- First solo album, Love and Hate, released in 1991; Yishai composed music for a selection of poems by Israeli poets.
- Second solo album, "A Man Would Not Talk About It", released in 2010

=== Music for theater ===
- Sanjer, Closer, Cruel and Tender - Habima Theater.
- Bracha - Beer Sheva Theater.
- The Last Striptease, Night Play - Tsavta Theater.
- Schneider & Schuster - Basel Theater (Switzerland)
- The Concert, The Rise and Fall of Little Voice, Headlines News - Beit Lesin Theater
- Revieue Lanoar / The Israeli Children theater
- Nice Tony, Killer Joe, Blue Remembered Hills, Sky, Some Voices, Little Malcolm and his struggle against the eunuchs, Glengarry Glen Ross, Crime - The Han Theater
- Brighton Beach Memoires - Haifa Theater
- God, Crocodiles, Marriage Play, Moon of Alabama, Kol Nidrei - Herzliya Theater.
- Perfect Days, The Last Summer - Beer Sheba Theater.
- Victims of Duty - Hazira Theater.
- Love and Anger - Herzliya Theater.
- The last hour of Kol - Tmuna Theater.
