= Corinne Allal =

Israeli musician (1955–2024)

Corinne Allal קורין אלאל
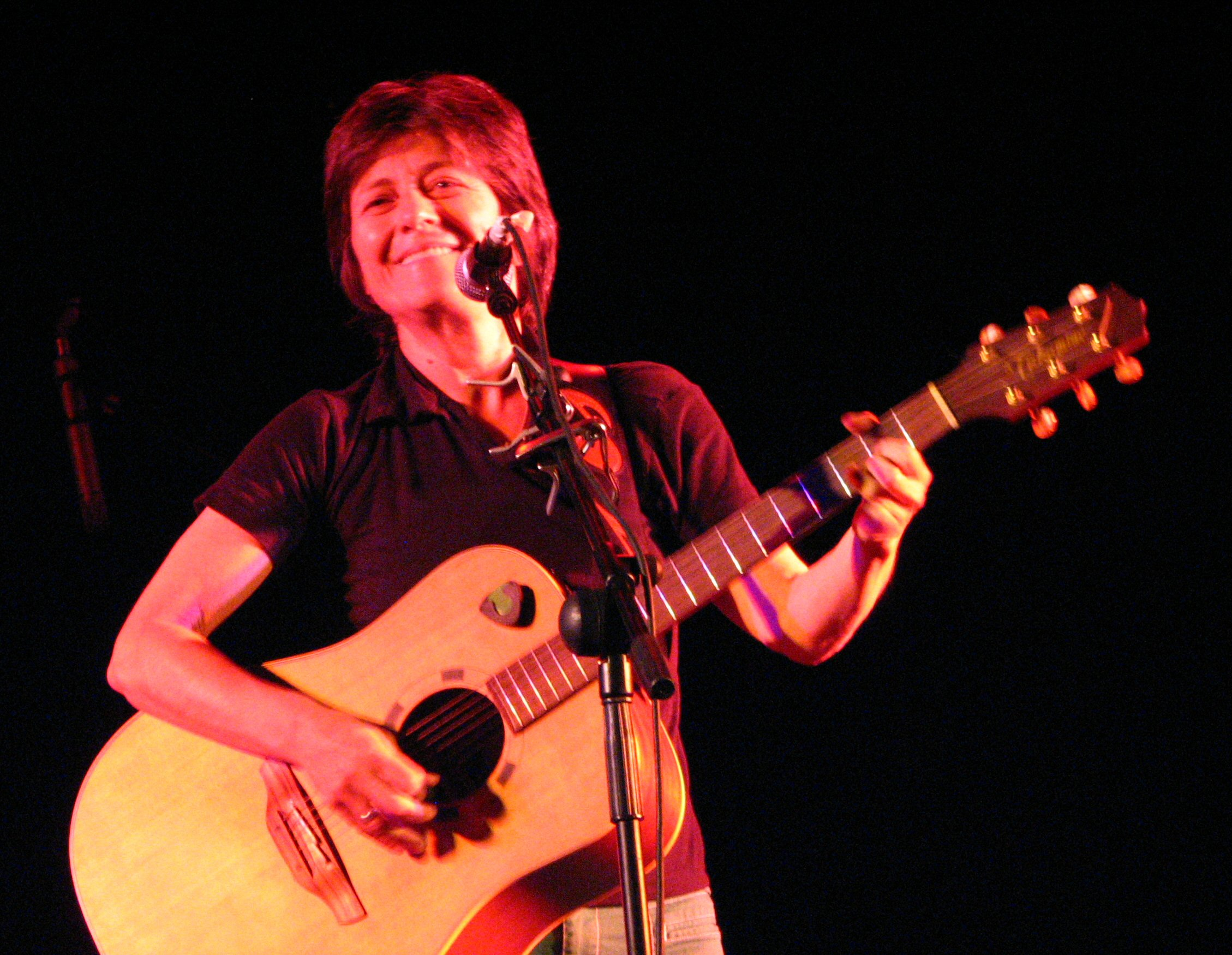
- Allal performing at Kabri in 2006

Background information
- Born: 15 March 1955; Tunis, French protectorate of Tunisia
- Died: 12 December 2024 (aged 69) Ramat Gan, Israel
- Genres: Rock; pop
- Occupations: Singer; guitarist; composer; record producer
- Instruments: Vocals; guitar
- Years active: 1973–2024
- Labels: NMC Music; Helicon
- Website: korinallal.co.il

Corinne Allal (Hebrew: קורין אלאל; 15 March 1955 – 12 December 2024) was an Israeli rock musician and music producer.

Allal was the 2022 recipient of the Landau Lifetime Achievement Award, in recognition of her outstanding contribution to Israeli music.

== Early life ==
Corinne Allal was born in Tunisia to Hubert and Claudine Allal. At the age of eight she immigrated to Israel with her parents and brother after her father, a Mossad operative, feared for his family's safety. She struggled to feel comfortable as a French-speaking immigrant, saying she had been a good student in Tunisia but it was hard for her in Israel due to language difficulties.

== Music career ==
During her military service she played in various bands of the IDF, including Lehakat Pikud Darom. She was eventually moved to the Combat Engineering Corps military band, where she performed alongside Yehudit Ravitz. In the 1970s she performed mainly as a guitarist. She released her first album in 1984. The albums Antarctica (1989), Sfat Imi (native tongue, 1990) and Zan Nadir (A Rare Kind, 1992) were produced by Yehudit Ravitz and enjoyed commercial success in Israel. In 2003 she was awarded the Prize of the Israeli Society of Composers and Music Producers (AKUM). Allal was considered leftist, and lived openly as a lesbian, but her music (particularly the song "Ein Li Eretz Acheret", I have no other country) is popular across the gamut of Israeli society and even beyond: Haredi superstar Lipa Schmeltzer once sang his rendition of Allal's composition, "Ein Li Eretz Acheret", with Allal providing backup on the guitar.

Allal collaborated with many artists throughout her career, contributing vocals to their songs. With Ravitz, she sang backup vocals on Arik Einstein's classic "Atur Mitzchech", voted in 2004 as Israel's greatest love song of all time.

== Personal life and death ==
Allal was married to her personal manager, Ruti Allal. Ruti was also a singer in the past and released her album "The Sweet Forests" in 1997 under her previous surname, Paran. The couple raised their two sons together. In July 2017, they separated after 18 years of partnership, but two years later, they rekindled their relationship. They resided in the moshav Ganot.

In a June 2017 interview with ynet, Allal shared that her participation in the television show "Big Brother" connected her to God and Judaism: "I started reading Psalms there, because in the evenings there was nothing else to do. When I returned home, I continued to connect with God and began discovering Judaism – out of nowhere." According to her, this also tied into her project of composing The Book of Ecclesiastes, which gave her a profound sense of belonging to the Land of Israel.

In 2009, Allal revealed that she had battled breast cancer. In 2023, she disclosed that she was diagnosed with pancreatic cancer.

On 12 December 2024, Allal died at the Tel HaShomer hospital at the age of 69, after a prolonged battle with cancer.
