= Hadorbanim =

Israeli musical artist

HaDorbanim הדורבנים
- Origin: Israel
- Genres: Disco, pop, funk and rock
- Years active: 1999–2009
- Labels: Helicon Records
- Website: helicon.co.il/dorbanim

HaDorbanim (Hebrew: הדורבנים, lit. The Porcupines) is an Israeli disco, pop, funk and rock band, formed in 1999. The band sings mostly in Hebrew.

The band announced its breakup in September 2009 soon after the release of their third album, "First After The Second".

They reunited in 2023.

== Final lineup ==
- Guy Mazig (guitar, vocals)
- Eyal Mazig (bass guitar, vocals)
- Ron Almog (drums)
- Ido 'Ziggo' Ofek (guitar, vocals)

== Former members ==
- Itay Gluska (lead vocals) (left in 2008)
- Uri Weinstock keyboards (left after the first album)
- Yossi Hasson PC (left after the first album)

== Discography ==
=== Studio albums ===
- Kobi - 2003
- Levi - 2006
- First After The Second - 2009
