= David Broza =

Israeli singer-songwriter

David Broza דוד ברוזה
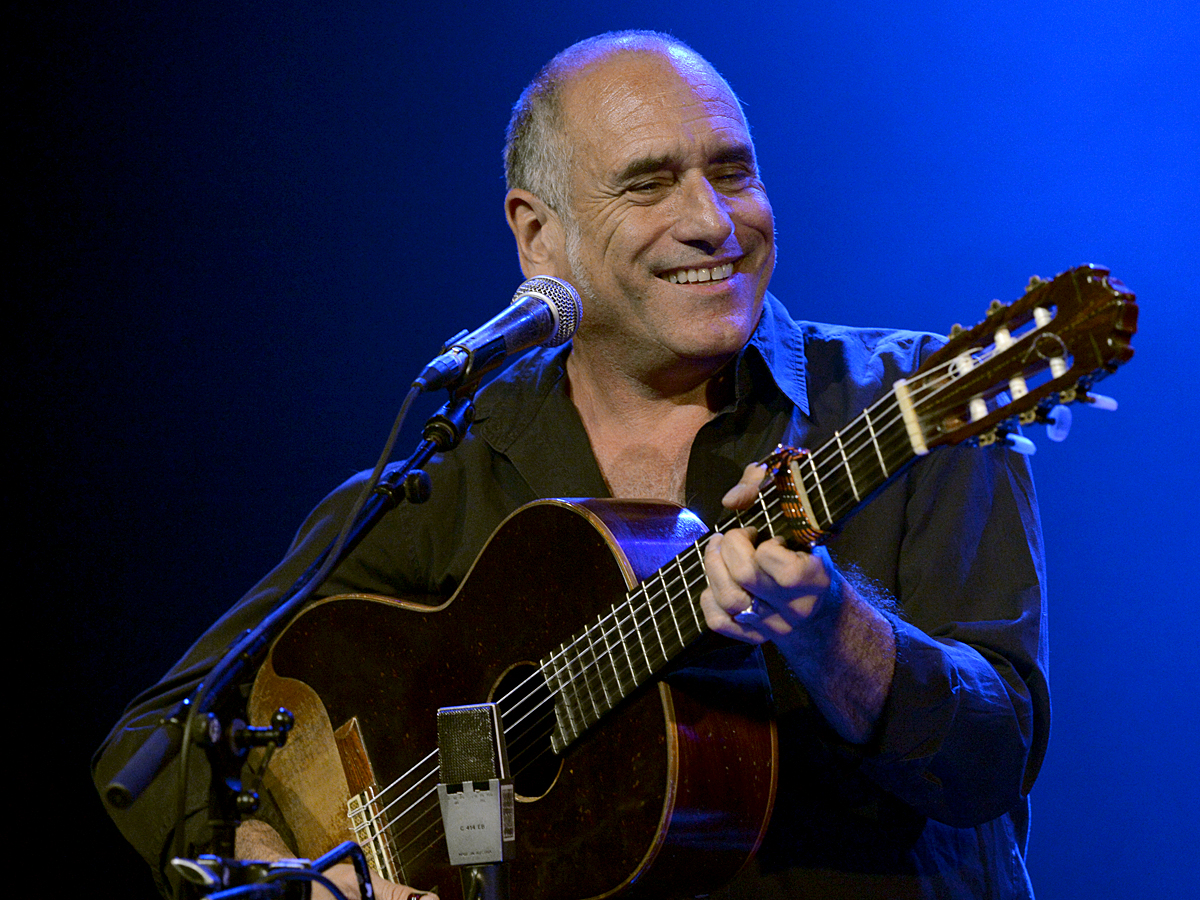

Background information
- Born: September 4, 1955 (age 71); Haifa, Israel
- Genres: Pop rock Rock; Folk rock Blues
- Occupation: Singer-songwriter
- Instruments: Vocals, guitar
- Years active: 1977—present
- Labels: NMC, Hed Arzi, S-Curve, RGB
- Website: davidbroza.net

David Simon Berwick Broza (Hebrew: דוד סימון ברויק ברוזה; born September 4, 1955) is an Israeli singer-songwriter. His music mixes modern pop with Spanish music.

== Biography ==
David Broza was born in Haifa, Israel. His father was an Israeli–British businessman of German-Dutch Jewish descent. He grew up in England and Spain, attending Runnymede College, in Madrid. Broza's grandfather, Wellesley Aron, was a co-founder of the Arab-Israeli peace settlement Neve Shalom – Wāħat as-Salām (The Oasis of Peace) and the Habonim youth movement. Young David Broza originally planned to become a graphic artist, and by age 17 he was selling his paintings in the Rastro, Madrid's Sunday flea market. Following high school, and while serving in the Israel Defense Forces, he began playing guitar in cafes to earn extra money. Eventually he was offered a record deal, but as he still hoped to attend the Rhode Island School of Design, he declined. He later recorded a tape to promote his live shows.

Broza was married to Ruthie Gabison Broza for 30 years, and together they have three children, Moran, Ramon and Adam. He lived in Cresskill, New Jersey for 17 years. He resides in Tel Aviv and is a member of Kehilat Sinai, a Conservative synagogue.

== Music career ==
His music reflects a fusion of the three countries in which he was raised: Israel, Spain and England. Since 1977, when his hit song “Yihye Tov” (Things Will Be Better) first hit the airwaves, David Broza has been working to promote a message of peace. In 2013, Broza began work on a new project – bringing together Israeli and Palestinian musicians for 8 days and nights to work side by side in an East Jerusalem recording studio. The result was East Jerusalem West Jerusalem, a collection of thirteen songs that blends cultures, languages and styles into a powerful statement about collaboration and coexistence. The album, produced by Steve Earle, features a stirring duet with Wyclef Jean.

In 2007, a concert at Masada featured Broza with special guests Jackson Browne and Shawn Colvin. David Broza appeared as a guest and shared the bill with Paul Simon, Bob Dylan, Van Morrison and others.

In 2022, Broza began singing at Temple Emanuel in New York City on Friday nights. The service consists of 14 prayers set to music by Broza with a back up of 27 musicians and a choir. Broza wrote the 14 melodies in 14 days and turned them into an album, Tefila.

Also in 2022, he contributed a guitar-based original score to the film, Who Are the Marcuses?.

== Musical collaboration ==
In 1978, David Broza collaborated with children's book author Yehonatan Geffen, along with other Israeli musical artists Yoni Rechter, Yehudit Ravitz, and Gidi Gov to release the album The Sixteenth Sheep, which was frequently ranked as one of the greatest albums in the history of Israeli music.

In 1994, David Broza performed with Texan singer-songwriter Townes Van Zandt during a Writers in the Round concert series at Main Street Theater in Houston. They performed in the round with David Amram and Linda Lowe for the first time. The foursome performed for the second time in the round at The Kerrville Folk Festival. After that David had no further contact with Townes however they had formed a strong connection and had cultivated a mutual respect. When Van Zandt died three years later, he left Broza a collection of unreleased poems and lyrics with a request that Broza set them to music. Years later, the result of that unusual story was the album "Night Dawn: The Unpublished Poetry of Townes Van Zandt", which was released at Writers in the Round Concert Series in Houston by Broza in 2010.

In 2007, David Broza performed at his annual Sunrise at Masada concert in Israel where Broza collaborated with Shawn Colvin and Jackson Browne. The concert was filmed as part of a PBS special and was released in 2014 on DVD and CD by Magenta Label Group.

In early 2013, Broza recorded sessions at Sabreen Studios in East Jerusalem with a band composed of both Israeli and Palestinian musicians, including Mira Awad, Shaa'nan Streett of Hadag Nahash, West Bank rap duo G-Town, and Wyclef Jean. The resulting album, "East Jerusalem/West Jerusalem," produced by Steve Earle and Steve Greenberg, was released in early 2014 on S-Curve Records. The aforementioned Haitian performer Wyclef Jean also appeared on the title track of the 2014 album.

== Peace activism ==
Broza was appointed a goodwill ambassador for UNICEF. His song "Together" (co-written with Ramsey McLean) was the theme song for the UNICEF 50th anniversary celebration in more than 148 countries.

== Discography ==
- La Mujer Que Yo Quiero (Spanish, 2023)
- Tefila (Hebrew, 2022)
- David Broza Sings Leonard Cohen (English, 2022)
- En Casa Limón (Instrumental Guitar, 2020)
- The Golden Ring (Hebrew, 2018)
- The Long Road (Single) (English, 2016)
- We Are All Alike (All Tears Are Alike) (Single) (Hebrew, 2016)
- Andalusian Love Song (Hebrew, 2015)
- East Jerusalem / West Jerusalem (English, 2014)
- Third Language (Hebrew, 2011)
- Night Dawn: The Unpublished Poetry Of Townes Van Zandt (English, 2010)
- At Masada: The Sunrise Concert featuring Shawn Colvin & Jackson Browne (English, 2007)
- Broza 5 (Live at Zappa Tel Aviv, 2007)
- Things Will Be Better: The Best of David Broza (JMG, 2006)
- Parking Completo (Spanish and Hebrew, 2006)
- Hameitav (Best Of in Hebrew, 2004)
- Parking Completo (Spanish, 2004)
- Todo O Nada (Spanish version of All or Nothing, 2002)
- All Or Nothing (Hebrew, 2002)
- Painted Postcard (English & Hebrew, 2002)
- Spanish Heart (English, 2001)
- Isla Mujeres (The Women's Island), DRO East West/Warner Records Spain (Spanish, 2000)
- Matchil Linshom (Starting to Breathe), Hed Artzi/RGB Records Gold (Hebrew, 1999)
- Sodot Gdolim (Big Secrets), RGB Records (Hebrew, 1995)
- Stone Doors, RGB Records (English, 1994)
- Second Street, RGB Records (English, 1994)
- Elements of Love, RGB Records (Hebrew, 1994)
- Masada Live, RGB Records Platinum (Hebrew, 1994)
- Time of Trains, RGB Records (English, 1993)
- Neshika Gnuva (Stolen Kiss), NMC Music (Hebrew, 1991)
- First Collection, NMC Music (Hebrew, 1990)
- Away From Home, RGB Records (English, 1989)
- Poets in New York (Poetas en Nueva York) (contributor, Federico García Lorca tribute album, 1986)
- Broza, NMC Music (Hebrew, 1984)
- Haisha Sheiti (The Woman by My Side), NMC Music Quadruple Platinum (Hebrew, 1983)
- Klaf (ACE), NMC Music (Hebrew, 1981)
- David Broza, NMC Music (Hebrew, 1979)
- The Sixteenth Sheep, NMC Music (Hebrew, 1978)
- Sikhot Salon (Small Talk), Phohokol (Hebrew, 1977)

== See also ==
- Israeli music
