= Ofir Shwartz =

Israeli jazz pianist, composer, and arranger

Ofir Shwartz אופיר שורץ

Background information
- Born: July 13, 1979; Haifa, Israel
- Genres: Jazz
- Occupations: Musician, composer, arranger, record producer
- Instrument: Piano
- Labels: sHmoo Records, Hevhetia
- Website: Official website

Ofir Shwartz (Hebrew: אופיר שורץ; born on 1979, in Haifa) is an Israeli jazz pianist, composer, arranger and record producer. He formed The Ofir Shwartz Trio in 2006.

== Career ==
In 2006, Ofir Shwartz formed his debut band as a leader, The Ofir Shwartz Trio, consisting of piano, double bass and drums. The trio gained significant success among jazz fans around the world, and has released two albums. Its current members are the Slovene drummer Gasper Bertoncelj and the New York resident double bass player Gal Shaya.

In 2010, Ofir Shwartz recorded Earlier in Time, his debut album as a band leader, for sHmoo Records; the album received positive reviews. In 2013, he recorded Shades of Fish, his second album as a band leader, for the Slovak label Hevhetia; the album, starred on various top-lists such as 'Google Play Top New Jazz'.

== Discography ==
=== As leader ===
- Ofir Shwartz Trio, Earlier in Time (sHmoo Records, 2010)
- Ofir Shwartz Trio, Shades of Fish (Hevhetia, 2013)

=== As sideman ===
with Residents of the Future

- Futuristic Worlds Under Construction (ROTF, 2004)
- Live at Klaipeda International Jazz Festival (DVD) (ROTF, 2006)

== Awards ==
Ofir Shwartz is a several times winner of the Ministry of Culture prize for creativity in music, the Haifa Arts Foundation prize for Jazz Musician, and is regularly supported by the Ministry of Foreign Affairs as one of the leading Israeli touring musicians.
