= Yehudit Ravitz =

Israeli musical artist

Yehudit Ravitz יהודית רביץ
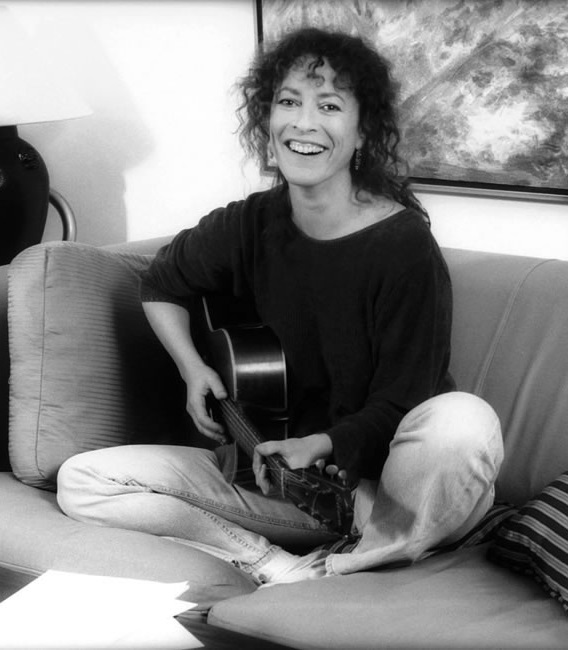
- Ravitz in 1997

Background information
- Born: December 29, 1956 (age 69)
- Origin: Beersheba, Israel
- Genres: Pop rock, Rock; Jazz
- Instrument: Guitar
- Years active: 1975–present
- Labels: Helicon; NMC Music

Yehudit Ravitz (Hebrew: יהודית רביץ Hebrew pronunciation: [ˈjudit ˈʁavit͡s]; born December 29, 1956) is an Israeli singer-songwriter, composer, arranger, and music producer. Active since the 1970s, she is considered one of the prominent figures in Israeli popular music.

== Music career ==
Ravitz was born in Beersheba. She was accepted into the military entertainment troupe of the Israeli Combat Engineering Corps, where she was recruited by Ehud Manor. During her military service, she joined the Israeli rock group Sheshet.

In 1977, Ravitz performed the song Slichot (Foregivenesses), a musical setting of a poem by Leah Goldberg, at the Israel Song Festival. The song placed seventh in the competition and was ranked number one on Kol Yisrael's Israeli Annual Hebrew Song Chart that year. Following this success, Ravitz left Sheshet and began her solo career. That same year, she participated in the ensemble of the musical project Eretz Tropit Yafa (A Beautiful Tropical Land), a Hebrew-language adaptation of Brazilian music produced by Matti Caspi, along with Caspi, Corinne Allal, Yurik Ben-David, Cilla Dagan, and The Parvarim.

In 1978, Ravitz joined Gidi Gov, Yoni Rechter, and David Broza in recording The Sixteenth Sheep, an album of children's songs written by Yehonatan Geffen. The album has remained popular in Israel since its release.

In 1987, she released the rock album Ba'a MeAhava (Coming from Love). In 1989, she produced Corinne Allal's album Antarctica, which achieved commercial success. In 1992, Ravitz co-produced the song Yad Anuga (Gentle Hand) by David D'Or.

In 1994, she took part in the jazz concert Jazz, Film, and Videotape, which featured jazz arrangements of her songs. In 1995, she collaborated with Esther Ofarim in a live performance that was later released on DVD, including a duet of Cinderella Rockefella. In 1997, she released the album Eizo Min Yalda (What Kind of Girl).

On July 3, 2008, Ravitz performed at the Caesarea Amphitheatre for the first time in ten years. The concert followed her appearance as a "model musician" on the reality show Kokhav Nolad. Additional performances were scheduled after tickets sold out quickly.

In 2010, Ravitz released Shirim MeHaBayit (Songs from Home), an album consisting of interpretations of classic Israeli songs.

In 2022, she received the ACUM Lifetime Achievement Award.

In 2024, Ravitz reunited with Gidi Gov, Yoni Rechter, and David Broza for a series of The 16th Sheep reunion concerts. After the initial ten dates sold out quickly, five additional shows were added, with over 12,000 tickets sold.

== Personal life ==
Ravitz has an adopted daughter named Ella, and they reside in Tel Aviv.

On December 23, 2009, Ravitz came out as a lesbian in an interview with Yedioth Ahronoth, in which she disclosed her relationship with Naomi Kanyuk, daughter of writer Yoram Kanyuk.

The interview was published in conjunction with the broadcast of a television documentary about her life, part of the Culture Heroes series on Channel 8. During their relationship, Kanyuk had a son with illustrator Amit Trainin. Ravitz and Kanyuk separated in 2016. Ravitz was previously in a relationship with artist Hila Lulu Lin.
