= Yehonatan Geffen =

Israeli author, poet, songwriter, journalist and playwright (1947–2023)

- יהונתן גפן
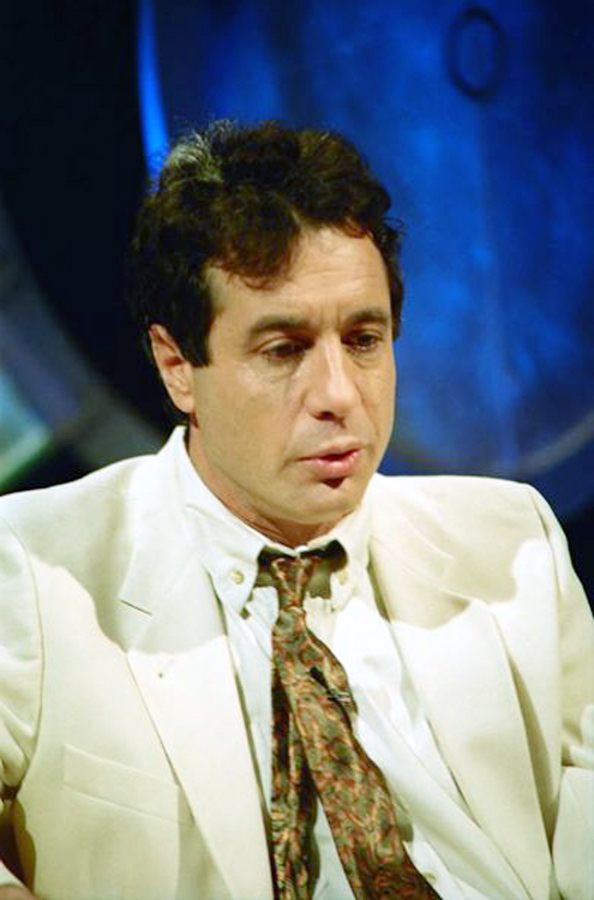
- Yehonatan Geffen c. 1993
- Born: 22 February 1947; Nahalal, Israel
- Died: 19 April 2023 (aged 76)
- Resting place: Nahalal Cemetery
- Occupations: Author, poet, songwriter, journalist, playwright
- Spouse(s): Nurit Makover Geffen, Ava Haddad
- Children: Aviv Geffen, Shira Geffen, Natasha Geffen
- Relatives: Moshe Dayan (uncle)

Yehonatan Geffen (Hebrew: יהונתן גפן; 22 February 1947 – 19 April 2023), also known as Yonatan Gefen, was an Israeli author, poet, songwriter, journalist, satirist and playwright.

== Early life and education ==
Geffen was born in moshav Nahalal. He had three younger sisters. Geffen's mother Aviva was the sister of Moshe Dayan, and his cousins were actor and director Assi Dayan, politician and author Yael Dayan, and sculptur Udi Dayan.

In 1965, he served as a paratrooper in the Israel Defense Forces under Matan Vilnai, and became an officer. In 1967, while Geffen was serving in the IDF, his mother overdosed on medication and died. Geffen considered it to have been suicide. His sister Nurit also died by suicide in 1977.

== Career ==
After his discharge from the IDF in 1969 and moving to Tel Aviv, he took up poetry. In 1972, upon his return from studies at Cambridge University in London, Geffen began writing a satirical column for the weekend supplement of the Hebrew-language mainstream newspaper Ma'ariv.

He joined the entertainment troupe "Lul" with Uri Zohar, Arik Einstein and Shalom Hanoch. The latter introduced Geffen to his future wife, Nurit Makober.

Much of Geffen's success came from his works for children, including the song "HaYaldah Hachi Yafah BaGan" ("The Prettiest Girl in Kindergarten") and the poetry collection HaKeves HaShisha-Asar ("The Sixteenth Lamb"). He also wrote many popular lyrics for adults, poems, plays and books. He frequently collaborated with David Broza, rendering Spanish songs into Hebrew. Geffen translated into Hebrew a variety of songs and poems. Many of Geffen's own lyrics have been set to music, widely performed and recorded by leading Israeli musicians.

In 1973, as part reserve service, Gefen fought in Yom Kippur War on the southern front. he served as an operations officer in the 48th battalion of the "Spearhead" paratrooper brigade, under Ariel Sharon's 143rd division. Gefen took part in the "Operation Knights of the heart" of Suez Canal crossing, and battles in the Ismailia sector.

Gefen returned from the war to his family, which then included his son Aviv Geffen, who was a six-month-old baby when the war began. According to him, he returned as a "ghost" who cannot function as a husband, father or writer. He woke up every night due to recurring nightmares from the battles. At that time there was no awareness of treatments for "battle shock", and he tried to deal with the nightmares by drinking alcohol, something that brought with it feelings guilt and shame. The alcoholism was later described by his son Aviv Gefen in his poems, which caused grief to Jonathan. Only after many years did Gefen tell the background that led him to escape to alcohol.

Geffen was often criticized for his strong left-wing leanings, which bordered on provocation, and even received death threats. He was one of a group of journalists (including Uri Dan, Yeshayahu Ben Porat, Eitan Haber, Hezi Carmel, Eli Landau and Eli Tavor) who in 1973 published the book The Failure, the first book to document the Yom Kippur War. It criticized the performance of the government and military and also contained first-hand descriptions of battles, casualties, injuries, and the losses and failures of military hardware. The book aroused considerable public interest.

In 2024, a series of shows was announced that would reunited Yoni Rechter, David Broza and Yehudit Ravitz for "The Sixteenth Lamb". written by Geffen, incorporating his voice in between the songs.

== Poem controversy ==
In February 2018, Geffen published a poem on his Instagram feed that ended with the following lines, comparing Palestinian activist Ahed Tamimi with David, Joan of Arc, Hannah Senesh and Anne Frank:

,את, אהד תמימי
,אדומת השיער
,כמו דוד שסטר לגולית
תהיי באותה שורה עם
.ז'אן דארק, חנה סנש ואנה פרנק

Translation:

You, Ahed Tamimi,
The red-haired,
Like David who slapped Goliath,
Will be counted among the likes of
Joan of Arc, Hannah Senesh and Anne Frank.

Reacting to this, defense minister Avigdor Lieberman demanded that Israel's popular Army Radio ban Geffen's work, and culture minister Miri Regev said Geffen was "crossing a red line by someone seeking to rewrite history". Geffen published an apology but didn't remove the poem from his Instagram profile.

== Personal life and death ==
Geffen was married for the first time in 1969 to actress and television personality Nurit Makover. The marriage ended in divorce. Their daughter, Shira Geffen (b. 1971), is a screenwriter and filmmaker married to author Etgar Keret; their son, Aviv Geffen (b. 1973), is a popular musician and singer-songwriter.

Geffen married a second time, to television actress Ava Haddad. Their daughter, Natasha Ruth Geffen (b. 1995), is an actress. This marriage also ended in divorce.

He died of a heart attack on 19 April 2023 at the age of 76.
