= Yoni Rechter =

Israeli musical artist

Yoni Rechter יוני רכטר
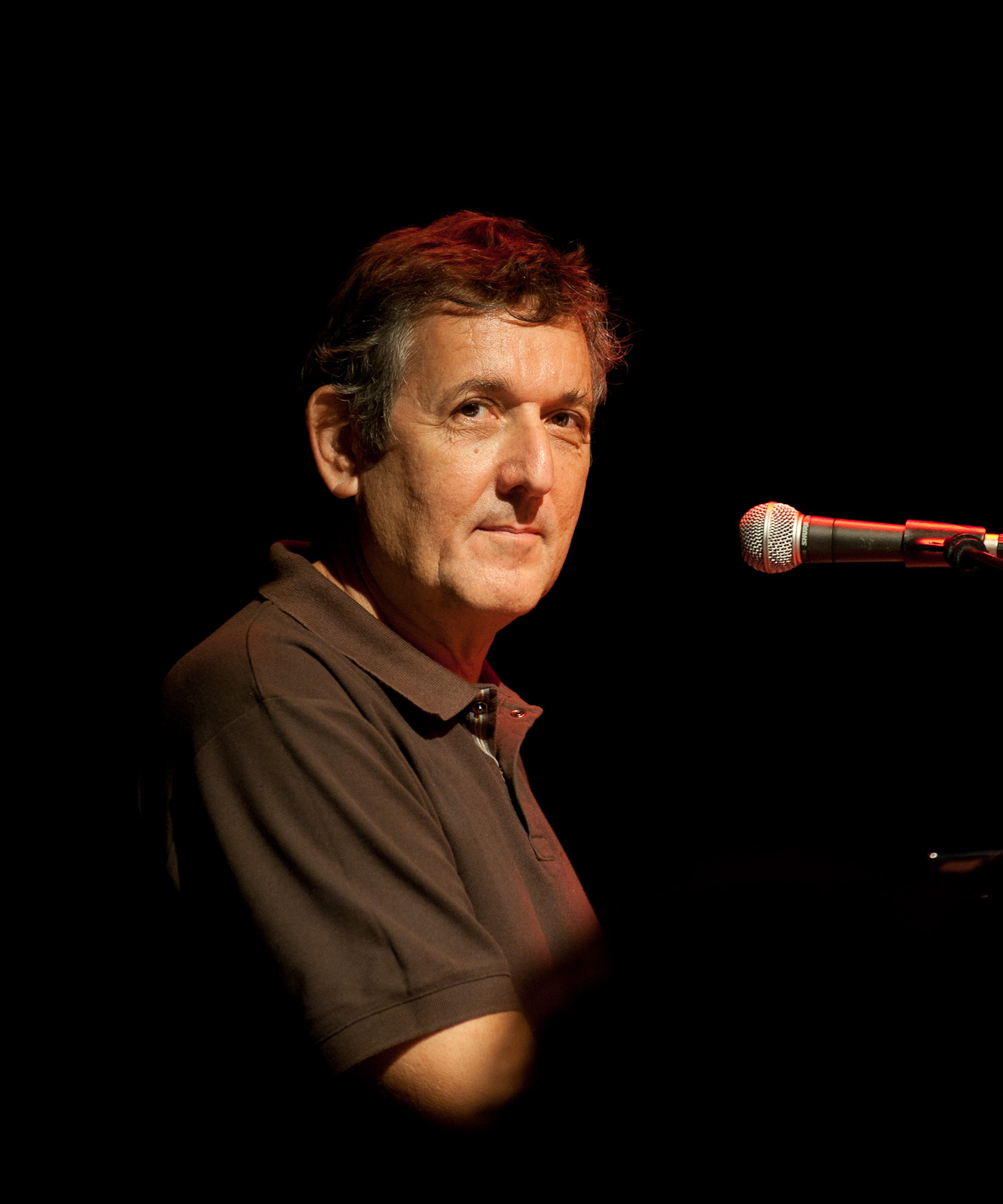
- Rechter in 2010

Background information
- Born: 18 November 1951 (age 74)
- Origin: Tel Aviv, Israel
- Genres: Rock, Progressive rock, Jazz, Classical
- Occupations: Singer, composer, pianist, arranger
- Years active: 1972—present
- Labels: Hed Arzi Music, NMC Music, Helicon Records

Yoni Rechter (Hebrew: יוני רכטר; born 18 November 1951) is an Israeli musician, composer, pianist, arranger and singer.

== Biography ==
Yonatan (Yoni) Rechter was born in Tel Aviv, Israel. He is the son of Israeli architect Ya'akov Rechter and stepson of Israeli actress Hanna Meron. He attended Tichon Hadash high school. At sixteen, he composed the music for the hit song "Tears of Angels" (דמעות של מלאכים in Hebrew, "Dma'ot Shel Mal'achim"), written by his high school classmate Dan Minster.

Rechter served in the Israeli Artillery Corps band. In 1972, after his release from the army, he joined the Israeli band Kaveret as a keyboardist, collaborating with Gidi Gov, Danny Sanderson, Alon Ole'archick and others. When Kaveret represented Israel in the 1974 Eurovision Song Contest, the rules only allowed for 6 on-stage performers (Kaveret had 7 members), so Rechter was asked to be the conductor of their entry. He stayed with the group until it disbanded in 1976.

== Music career ==
Apart from playing the keyboard in Kaveret, he formed the progressive rock duo "14 Octaves" with Avner Kenner and arranged and wrote songs for leading Israeli singers, among them Arik Einstein. One of the most famous songs he composed for Einstein was "Your Forehead is Ornamented" (עטור מצחך in Hebrew, "Atur Mitz'chech"). Its first version was arranged by Rechter, and was sung by Arik Einstein with Corinne Allal and Yehudit Ravitz. He later produced albums for Gidi Gov, Esther Ofarim, Yossi Banai and Yehudit Ravitz. One of his performances with Ravitz, which was titled "Once And Forever" (באופן קבוע וחד פעמי, in Hebrew, "Be'Ofen Kavu'ah Ve'Chad Pe'ami"), was also released as an album.

In 1978, Rechter collaborated on "The Sixteenth Sheep" (הכבש השישה-עשר in Hebrew, "Ha'Keves Ha'Shishah Asar"), an album of poems by Yonatan Geffen set to music.

Rechter's debut album "Intending" (התכוונות in Hebrew, "Hitkavnut") was released in 1979. It included quiet ballads, some based on the lyrics of Israeli songwriter Eli Mohar. That year, he also wrote the music for a dance performance, "A Legend in the Sands," performed by the Inbal Dance Theater. He also composed the music for Inbal's show "Jaffa is Sleeping."

In 1981, Rechter collaborated with Matti Caspi and Yitzhak Klepter in the instrumental album "Lines" (קווים in Hebrew, "Kavim"). In 1982, he produced another Gidi Gov album, "40:06", and composed all of its melodies. In 1984, he produced Israeli singer Nurit Galron's album "One Soft Touch" (נגיעה אחת רכה in Hebrew, "Negi'aa Achat Rakah"). In 1986, he took part in shows alongside Israeli comedians and performers Gidi Gov, Moni Moshonov and Shlomo Bar-Aba in the comedy show "A One-Time Evening" (ערב חד-פעמי in Hebrew, "Erev Chad Pe'ami"), and in the Gulf War in 1991, they did a follow-up show, "A Conventional One-Time Evening" (ערב חד פעמי קונבנציונאלי in Hebrew, "Erev Chad Pe'ami Conventionali").

In 1988, he composed and arranged the music for an album of songs based on the poems of Avraham Chalfi and Haya Shenhav. In the album "I Used To Be a Child" (הייתי פעם ילד in Hebrew, "Hayiti Pa'am Yeled"), he composed and arranged all songs, some of which became very popular in Israel. In the album "The Lion, The Dove and a Blue Hen" (האריה, היונה ותרנגולת כחולה in Hebrew, "Ha'Arie, Ha'Yonah Ve'Tarnegolet Kchulah") Rechter composed and arranged more children's songs.

In 1991, the Israel Festival and the Israeli Broadcasting Authority produced an evening of Rechter songs titled "The Main Thing is the Romance" (העיקר זה הרומנטיקה in Hebrew, "Ha'Ikar Ze Ha'Romantika"), which aired on Israeli television and released as an album. In 1995, Rechter and Eli Mohar released an album titled "Thoughts and Options" (מחשבות ואפשרויות in Hebrew, "Machshavot Ve'Efsharuiot").

In 2002, Rechter released "Another Story" (עוד סיפור in Hebrew, "Od sipur"). The solo album, which was divided into three sections, consisted of mostly intimate songs. The album was well received by music critics, but was not a commercial success. Rechter also took part in composing and arranging music for many theatre plays and shows. In 2005, Rechter released a best of double CD entitled "Each time I play", filled with his own recordings, as well as pieces with other singers. Rechter judged auditions for the IDF's musical troupes.

== Musical style ==
According to Haaretz music critic Ben Shalev, Rechter's major musical influences were "Bach, Beatles and Bill Evans." Other influences are Chick Corea and the harmonies of Sasha Argov. He also cites progressive rock and jazz artists such as Herbie Hancock, Gentle Giant, King Crimson, Genesis, Yes and Emerson, Lake & Palmer.

== Personal life ==
Rechter is married to Dafna, a former art teacher, with whom he has two sons.

== Awards ==
In 2008, Rechter won the EMET Prize, awarded for extraordinary achievement in art, science and culture.

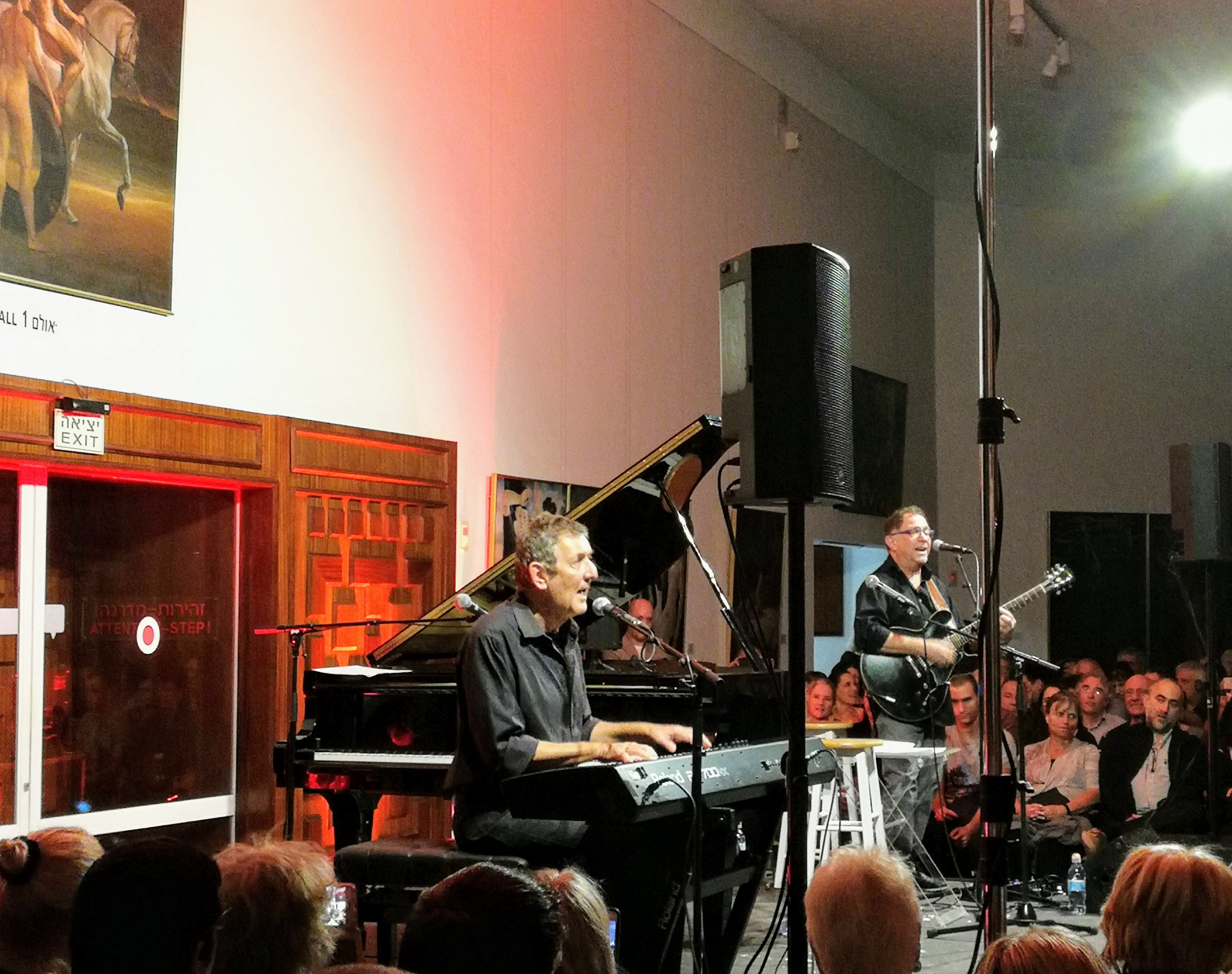
Yoni Rechter

== Albums ==
- The Sixteenth Lamb (הכבש השישה-עשר, Ha'Keves Ha'Shisha-Asar)
- Intending (התכוונות, Hitkavnut)
- Love Has Many Faces (האהבה, פנים רבות לה Ha'Ahava, Panim Rabot La) With Arik Einstein
- Regularly And one-timely (באופן קבוע וחד פעמי, Be'Ofen Kavuah Ve'Chad Pe'ami) With Yehudith Ravitz
- At Eye Level (בגובה העיניים, Be'Govah Ha'Einayim) With Eli Mohar
- Romance Is What Counts (העיקר זה הרומנטיקה, Ha'Ikar Ze Ha'Romantica)
- Lines (קווים, Kavim)
- Thoughts and Options (מחשבות ואפשרויות, Machshavot Ve'Efsharuiot) With Eli Mohar
- Another Story (עוד סיפור, Od Sipur)
- Right Now (ממש עכשיו, Mamash Achshav) A live recording
- The Lion, The Dove and a Blue Hen (האריה, היונה ותרנגולת כחולה, Ha'Arie, Ha'Yonah Ve'Tarnegolet Kchulah)
- 14 Octavas (ארבע עשרה אוקטבות, arba esre octavot) With Avner Kenner
- From The Songs of Avraham Chalfi (משירי אברהם חלפי, Mi'Shirei Avraham Chalfi)
- I Used to be a Child (הייתי פעם ילד, Hayiti Pa'am Yeled) With Arik Einstein
- A Legend in the Sands (אגדה בחולות, Agada Ba'Cholot)

== See also ==
- Music of Israel
