= Koren (disambiguation) =

Koren is a surname and given name.

Koren may also refer to:

- Koren Publishers Jerusalem, Israeli publishing house
- Koren Specific Technique, a controversial new age chiropractic technique
- Koren Type, Hebrew font
- Koren (village), a village in Bulgaria
- Corno di Rosazzo, or Koren, a commune of Italy
- Wurzenpass or Koren, a mountain pass on the border of Austria and Slovenia

== See also ==
- Coren
