= Meir Ariel =

Israeli musician (1942–1999)

Meir Ariel מאיר אריאל
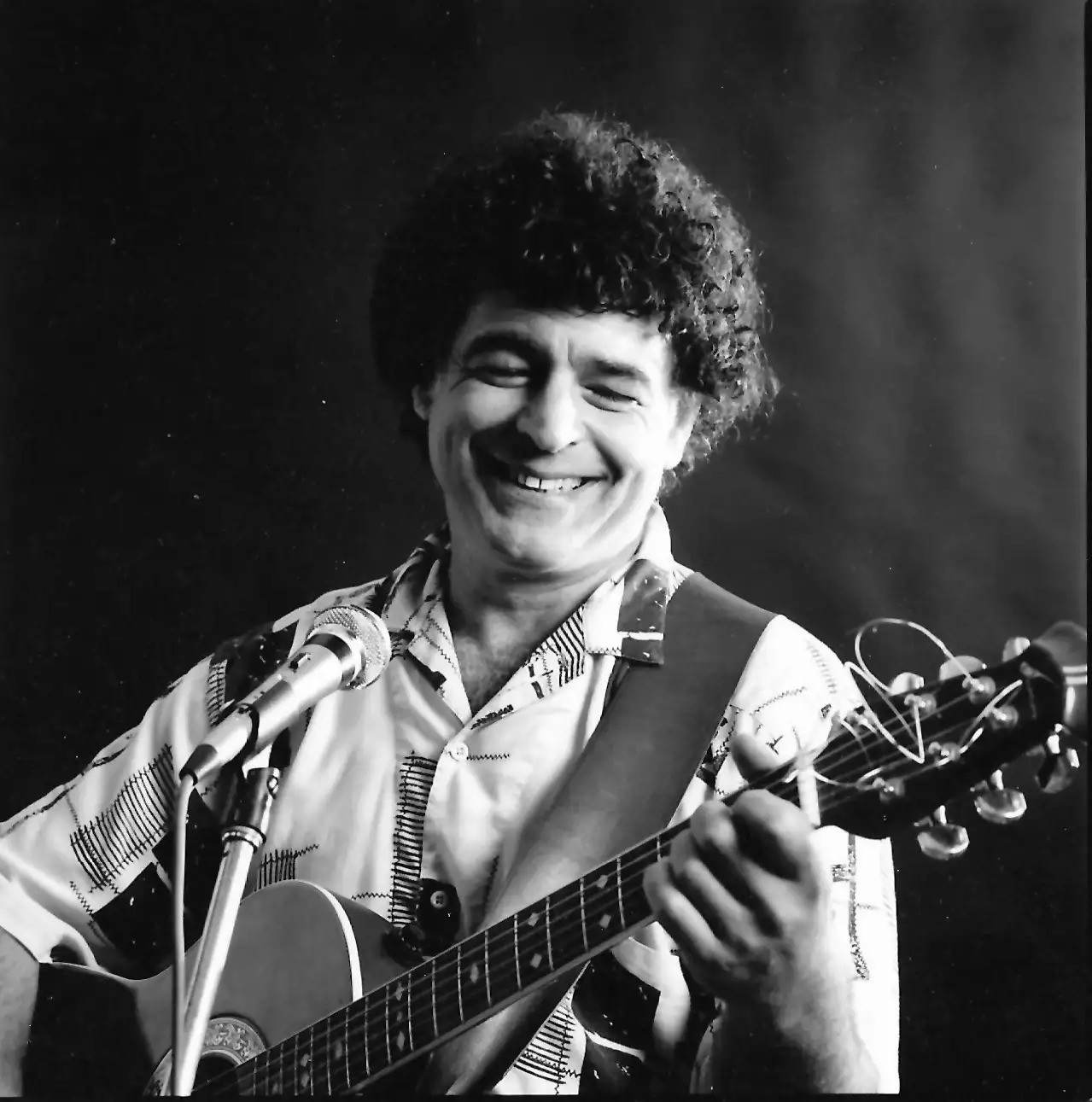

Background information
- Born: 2 March 1942; Mishmarot, Mandatory Palestine
- Died: 18 July 1999 (aged 57) Pardes Hanna-Karkur, Israel
- Genres: Folk music; folk rock; blues
- Instruments: Vocals; guitar
- Years active: 1967–1999
- Labels: NMC; Media Direct

Meir Ariel (Hebrew: מאיר אריאל; 2 March 1942 – 18 July 1999) was an Israeli singer-songwriter and guitarist.

He was known as a "man of words" for his poetic use of the Hebrew language in his lyrics. His influences included Hebrew poets such as ibn Gabirol, Natan Alterman, S. Y. Agnon and Hayim Nahman Bialik, and American singer-songwriters such as Bob Dylan. Ariel's fame and recognition grew posthumously.

== Biography ==
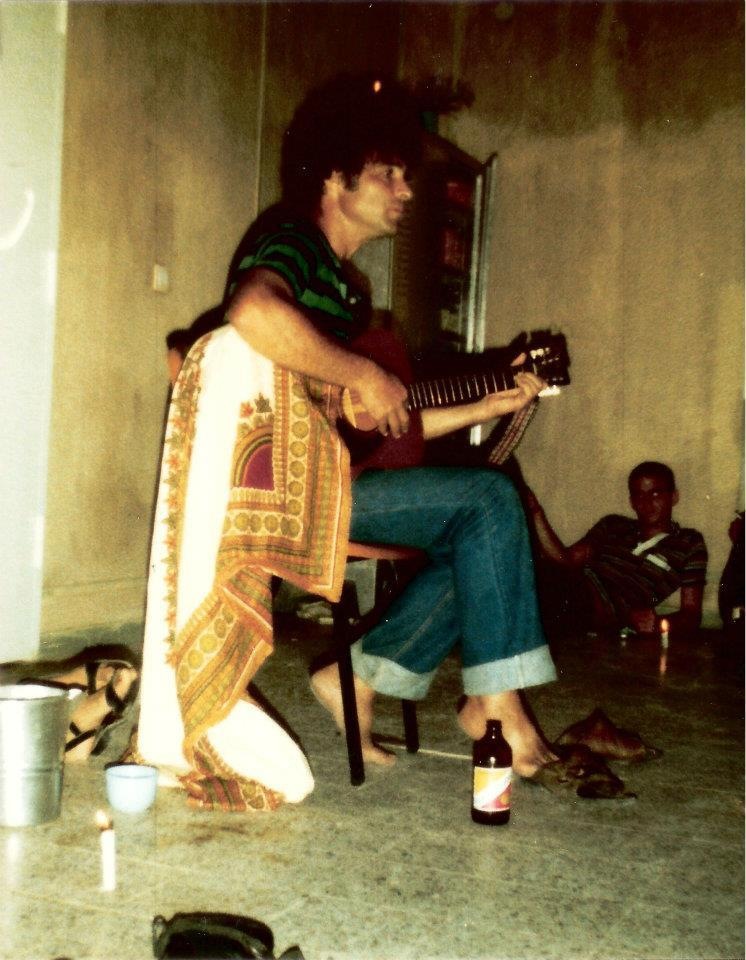
A '70s-era Meir Ariel performance

=== Childhood ===
Ariel was born on the Fast of Esther in 1942 and grew up in Kibbutz Mishmarot. The son of Guda and Alexander (Sasha) Ariel (Bashmashnikov), he is the youngest after two daughters. His father was one of the founders of Kibbutz, an educator, and the manager of the school Ariel attended.

In his youth, Ariel experimented with writing poetry, and his songs were composed by his friend, Shalom Hanoch, as part of "Hamishmaron", the kibbutz's singing group. Hanan Yovel also took part in the creative process.

Since childhood, Meir Ariel was a friend of Shalom Hanoch, who also lived there and became one of Israel's most popular rock artists.

=== Military Service, "Jerusalem of Iron", and the United States ===
Ariel served in the Paratroopers Brigade of the IDF and participated as part of that brigade in the Battle for Jerusalem at the beginning of the Six-Day War. This inspired him to write the song "Yerushalayim Shel Barzel" ("Jerusalem of Iron"). The song was based on Naomi Shemer's hit song "Jerusalem of Gold", and borrowed its melody (in turn borrowed from the Basque folk song "Pello Joxepe"). It was his reaction to what he saw as the hyper-patriotism of the Israeli public and media of that time. The "Yerushalayim Shel Barzel" mini-album cover showed Ariel in his military uniform thus giving him the nickname "the singing paratrooper".

In 1966, Meir Ariel married Tirza Hagadish from Kibbutz Kfar Szold.

Despite the fame, Ariel decided that he was not interested in pursuing a career as a singer-paratrooper, as he distanced himself from the gimmicks involved. In June 1968, he travelled with his wife and daughter Shiraz to Detroit in the United States as a representative for the United Kibbutz Movement. He was greatly influenced by American music, especially Bob Dylan, and the messages conveyed in his songs. Ariel began writing songs inspired by Dylan. Wanting a break from Kibbutz life, Ariel moved to the United States, working as a Shaliach to the labour Zionist Habonim Youth Movement. The family stayed in Detroit for about two years and eventually returned to Israel. During their time in Detroit, their son Shachar was born.

After living in the United States for some time, Ariel returned to Israel and decided to create folk rock-inspired music. He fought in the Yom Kippur War in the Suez Canal and returned to Mishmarót after the war. Between 1978 and 1988, he released his first three LPs. The first album's title, Shirey Chag Umoed Venofel, is a play on words of the term "Shirèy Chag uMoèd" which means "holiday songs". The album's title could also mean, in Hebrew, "songs for circling, tripping, and falling".

=== First Albums ===
Upon his return to Israel, Ariel tried to blend in Tel Aviv as a cinema and music figure, but without much success. During the Yom Kippur War, Ariel served in Sinai as part of the 416th Paratroopers Brigade, 247th Division. After the ceasefire, his unit captured the city of Suez. During his extended reserve service following the ceasefire, he wrote the song "A quiet night passed over our forces in Suez", expressing his perspective on the reality and events experienced on the front.

After the war, he returned to Kibbutz Mishmarot and to his family. In 1976, his son Ehud was born. He continued to create his art, and in 1978, he released his first album, "Holiday and Festival Songs and Falls," which includes, among others, the songs "Shir Ke'ev," "Tikva," "Erol," "Terminal Luminette," "Mazkeret LaMa'onenim", and "Dr. Hithakhamut".

In the years 1983–1985, he served as the secretary of Kibbutz Mishmarot.

His second album, "...VeGalui Einayim", was released in 1984. It includes, among others, his famous songs "Laila Shaket Avar Al Kochothaneu BeSuez", written after the Yom Kippur War, "Sdot Goldberg" (according to some interpretations, the song is a response to Leah Goldberg's "At Telchi B'Sadeh"), "Mahleket Musar Heskel", and "Shir Tat Muda Zmani".

=== Leaving Mishmarot and Moving to Tel Aviv ===
In late 1985, shortly after completing his role as the kibbutz secretary, Ariel's family decided to leave Kibbutz Mishmarot. Initially, they requested a two-year leave, and by the end of 1987, they announced their permanent departure from the kibbutz. The family moved to Tel Aviv and settled in an apartment on 70 Hertzel Street.

In 1987, he released a book of poems that included songs from his first two albums, songs he wrote for various artists, and songs that were intended for his next album.

In October 1987, during the Sukkot holiday, Meir Ariel embarked on a concert tour in the United States called "Meir Ariel's Election Journey." For this tour, he was accompanied by the band "Karizma" - Yehuda Eder (guitars, vocals, and voices), Miki Shaviv (guitars, bass, vocals, and voices), Ra' Mocheach (drums), and Yoav Kutner (conga drums and vocals). The tour lasted a week, during which the band performed across the country, from Kiryat Shmona to Eilat. The tour was documented and released as a film directed by Ido Sela.

In April 1988, he released his third album, "Yerukot" (the adjective "green" in feminine plural; on the album sleeve, the name "Yellow Blue" was printed in English). During the recording period, his father died, and Meir Ariel chose to dedicate the album to his memory, particularly with the song "Neshel HaNachash," which became the biggest hit from this album. Other well-known songs from this album include "Midrash Yonati," a protest song against the injustice caused by contemporary Judaism in the Land of Israel, "Eich Lif'amim Ani", and "Peluga BeKav".

=== The 90s ===
In 1990, he released an extended play called "We Passed Pharaoh," from which the title track achieved particular success.

In 1991, he independently published a poetry book titled "The Snake Bit." The book included several of his songs as well as three short prose pieces.

In August 1991, on the occasion of their 25th wedding anniversary, the couple celebrated their silver wedding. The ceremony included a second wedding canopy, and Ariel wrote a new vow, which the couple signed.

A week later, the couple was arrested after police found drugs in their home, including cocaine. Tirtza claimed that the cocaine was received as a gift. Ariel stated that he has been using hashish for over 25 years (as he wrote in his song "Narkoman Tzibur": "I myself am addicted to a piece of hashish"), but has never needed hard drugs. The trial took place about six months later. The couple admitted to growing and possessing cannabis, hashish, and cocaine. Ariel was sentenced to six months of community service, two years of probation, and a fine of 3,000 NIS, while Tirtza received two years of probation and a fine of 1,500 NIS. Ariel conducted his community service at the Central Library for the Blind, recording books.

In September 1993, his fourth album, "Zir'ei Kayitz" (Summer Seeds), produced by Shalom Hanoch, was released. The album's successful songs included "Zir'ei Kayitz," "Lo Titfoss Oti", and "Kotzim Aleph".

In March 1993, he presented the solo performance "Yesh Torem" as part of the "Theatroneto" festival. The performance ran twice during the festival and included songs and connecting segments written by Ariel, forming the basis for the album "Rishumei Pecham" (Coal Sketches).

"Rishumei Pecham," his fifth full album, was released in June 1995. It was a unique concept album with songs that Ariel referred to as more "difficult" to listen to. Among other tracks, the album included the songs "Shamati She'at Nimtzet", "Bas Babalon", and "Chayat HaBarzel", in which he critically addressed technological progress on one hand and moral decline on the other, inspired by the vision of Daniel about the Iron Animal.

In May 1996, during a performance with the band "Zir'ei Kayitz" held at Hard Rock Cafe in Tel Aviv, an amalgamation of the "Karizma" band took place. The live album "Dlatot Niftahot Me'atzman" (Doors Open by Themselves), released in August 1998, documented the unified performance and included, in addition to Ariel's songs, several tracks composed by band members and performed during this show. The complete performance, including the segment of the "Zir'ei Kayitz" band, was released on the DVD "Derech Dim'a Shkufa" (Through a Transparent) following Ariel's death.

In April 1997, his sixth album, "Bernard and Louise," was released. This was a concept album primarily dealing with the renewed love of a married couple after many years. From the successful album, the songs "Hiknasi Kvar La'oto Ve'nisa" (Get in the Car Already and Let's Go) and "Lo Yachol Lehoriid Mimech Et Ha'einayim" (Cannot Take My Eyes off You) became prominent hits.

=== Newspaper Interview Sensation ===
On August 12, 1998, an interview with Ariel was published in Yedioth Ahronoth, in which Ariel expressed strong criticism towards the LGBTQ+ community, referring to them as "perverts" and "a breeding ground for diseases". Following the controversy that ensued, he explained the next day in a radio interview: "Every preference has an element of racism. If homosexuals parade with a flag of sexual preference, which in my eyes is an insult to the relationship between male and female, then I am allowed to prefer to see them as perverts. That's my right". About a month later, he was interviewed by Neri Livneh in Haaretz and reiterated some of his statements. The interview stirred up a storm, and many articles against him were written by members of the LGBTQ+ community.

The LGBTQ+ community boycotted Ariel and began protesting against him. Several demonstrations took place outside his performances and near his home. After a show at "Logos" in Tel Aviv on September 23, some protesters approached Ariel, spat on him, and poured water on him. Ariel announced his retirement from performances the day after the incident, but a few months later, he returned to the stage.

In 1998, Ariel made a series of condemning comments about the gay and lesbian community in several interviews. This resulted in a majority of his LGBT followers boycotting him and several protests took place outside his home and his performances. In one incident, a few protesters spat on Ariel and poured water on him. As a result, he took a break from performing and apologised for his comments two months later, saying they were prejudiced and ignorant.

Following the controversy, Ariel's family left Tel Aviv and moved to Pardes Hanna. On October 7, Ariel published a letter of apology in which he admitted that his words were spoken out of ignorance and an outdated mindset.

=== The last year of his life and his death ===
In early 1999, Ariel returned to the stage. Later, he formed a new band that included Giga (David Levy), Amos Friedman, Eran Porat, and Doron Kochli. In June 1999, the band performed twice at the Barby Club in Tel Aviv. The performances were recorded and released after Ariel's death on the album "In the Last Performance at Barbi 1999" (although his actual last performance before his death was at the Arad Festival on July 9). Another scheduled performance on July 13 was cancelled due to his illness.

Meir Ariel died on July 18, 1999, the 5th of the Jewish month Av, at the age of 57, after suffering from a type of Typhus (Mediterranean spotted or "Boutonneuse" fever), caused by the rickettsia parasite and transmitted by a tick bite. A week before his death, he experienced a fever, but only two days before his death did the doctors diagnose the cause of the disease. After his death, the Ariel family filed a medical negligence lawsuit, which ended in an out-of-court financial settlement.

Ariel is buried in the cemetery of Kibbutz Mishmarot. He left behind his wife, Tirtza, and three children.

In the year 2000, following his death, another album by Meir Ariel was released, titled "Modeh Ani" - an album with home recordings, including the songs "Modeh Ani", "Tzavat Lezikaron", "Al Eretz Movarim Rak Belev", "Tzo'ek Et SheChaser Lo", and "Tzedek Tzedek Tirdof".

Several tribute albums performed by various Israeli artists performing his songs were released posthumously, among them several live memorial performances, and a track-by-track re-recording of his 1995 album Rishumey Pecham [charcoal sketches]. An album of Ariel's own unreleased recordings was released as well, titled "Mode Ani", which can be translated as "I am thankful" (based on the Jewish morning prayer). Ehud Banai wrote "B'loez Canaani", and "Caananite Blues" in his memory.

Among the many artists for whom Meir Ariel wrote are Shalom Hanoch, Arik Einstein, Rita, Sharon Haziz and David Broza.

In 2009, the Israeli postal service issued a stamp in his honour. Ariel is one of the central characters in Yossi Klein Halevi's 2013 Like Dreamers: The Story of the Israeli Paratroopers Who Reunited Jerusalem and Divided a Nation (and Halevi's book is the closest to an English-language biography of Ariel to appear). A biography in Hebrew by Prof. Nisim Calderon and Prof. Oded Zehavi was published in late 2016, entitled "One Errol: A biography of Meir Ariel".

=== Writing for others ===
Alongside his solo career, Meir Ariel wrote songs for other singers. A fruitful collaboration was with his kibbutz mate Shalom Hanoch, who composed many of Ariel's songs, both for himself and for other singers. Ariel and Hanoch began creating songs together in their youth, and one of their most famous ones, "Agadat Deshe" ("Grass Legend"), gained popularity in various performances, including those by Arik Einstein, Hanan Yovel, and Oshik Levi, in the mid-1970s. Within the framework of their band "Tamuz", Hanoch, along with Ariel Zilber, composed Ariel's song "Sof Onat Hatapuzim" ("End of the Orange Season").

The band also performed Ariel's "Holech BaTel" ("Walking Idly"), composed by Zilber. Other songs composed by Ariel and performed by Hanoch include "Shvita," "Bo'i Lirkod" ("Come Dance," with lyrics by Ariel, Hanoch, Dori Ben-Ze'ev, and Yaakov Rotblit), and "Omerim She'bli." Hanoch continued to compose and perform Meir Ariel's songs even after Ariel's death, such as "Hatzracha" ("The Scream") on the album "Or Yisraeli" (2003) and the songs "Pachadti (Hypotenuse)" and "HaNashim BeChayai" ("The Women in My Life") on the album "HaMikre VeHaTa'ut" (2015).

Shalom Hanoch composed songs from Meir Ariel's repertoire for other singers as well. In Arik Einstein's 1968 album "Mazal Gdi", songs written by Ariel and Hanoch, such as "Mekofef Habananot" ("Bananas Bender") and "Sipur Motam Shel Alma ve'Elm" were included. Einstein also performed Ariel's songs "Risim" and "Pit'om Bil'adav" ("Suddenly Without Him"), both composed by Hanoch. Additionally, Hanoch composed for Shlomo Artzi's band Shlomo Artzi & Shovavei Tzion the songs "Noga" and "Heyi Isha" from Ariel's repertoire. He also composed "Lishon Lishon" for Oshik Levi. Oshik Levi performed Ariel's song "Tor A. B. G." in his album "Eifo Ta'inu" which Ariel wrote, and it serves as an early version of the song "Terminal Luminlett".

Another artist who has often performed Meir Ariel's songs is Gidi Gov. In Gov's 1987 album "Derech Eretz", four songs written by Ariel were included: "Shlal Sharav", which became a hit, "Lolita", which also achieved success, "Gever Ba'ir" (all three with music by Yehuda Poliker), and "Derech Eretz" (with music by Moshe Levi). For his next album, "Ein Od Yom" ("No More Day"), Gov recorded two more of Ariel's songs with music by Danny Sanderson, from which the song "Bassade Yarok" ("In a Green Field") was released.

Another collaboration of Ariel was with David Broza, who performed his songs "Shir Ga'agu'im" ("Longing Song"), "Mitachat Lashamayim" ("Under the Skies"), and "Lo Yachol Lehoriyd Mimcha Et Ha'einayim" ("Cannot Take My Eyes Off You"). Additionally, they collaborated on the song "Betzohorei Yom" ("In the Afternoon"), for which Broza composed the music to Ariel's lyrics, and they performed it together.

In the early '90s, Ariel collaborated with Dani Litani on his album "Tkufat Hachayitz" (1992). Ariel wrote five songs for the album, and Litani and Ariel co-wrote an additional song. In Litani's next album, "Min-Out", the song "Houston, Texas (VeHagoral HaYehudi)" appeared, which they co-wrote.

Most of the songs that Ariel wrote for other artists were not composed by him, but some of them were, including "Lo Yachol Lehoriid Mimek Et Ha'einayim" for David Broza, "Sof Shavua BaKfar" for Dori Ben Zeev, and "Tzionah" for Nissim Garameh. Other well-known songs that Ariel wrote for different artists include "Derech Gever Be'isha" and "Lama Lo" for Izhar Ashdot, "Ahavini" for Rami Kleinstein, "Erev Kahol Amok" for Rita (based on music by Shlomo Yidov), and "Holchet Mimmha" for Sharon Haziz (with music by Ze'ev Nechama and Tamir Kliski).

Even after Ariel's death, artists continued to compose and perform his songs. Rami Kleinstein composed the song "Ata Bechol Zot" (also known as "Alita Li BaZikaron" and "HaLayla Lo") for Rita's 2003 album "Hamtzan," which was later performed by Dudu Tassa. Kleinstein also composed and performed Ariel's song "Mashehu Tov". In the 2004 Israel Song Festival, two songs written by Ariel were featured: "Layla Bli Tipa Shel Delek" performed by Hemi Rudner and "Or Yom Horef Shemeshi" performed by Zehava Ben.

In 2012, the band Hatikva 6 composed the song "Kshehayita," and a year later, the band Hadag Nahash composed the song "Kovlana Al Miflagot Israel" in honour of the elections for the 19th Knesset held that year. This song also served as the theme song for the 2012 season of the TV show "Eretz Nehederet" (A Wonderful Country). In 2016, Dori Ben-Ze'ev performed the song "Ra'ash Bamanoa" written by Meir Ariel and composed by Israel Kasif.

In October 2017, the musician Sagol 59 (Chen Rotem) released the song "Chaloshes Lamotsash", which he composed and recorded for lyrics by Meir Ariel that had not been published before. Sagol received the lyrics from Meir Ariel's family and composed and recorded them at their request. In 2020, Tal Sondak performed "Ish Hamapuhit" in his album "Shiratam" with music by Rami Kleinstein.

== Memorialization ==
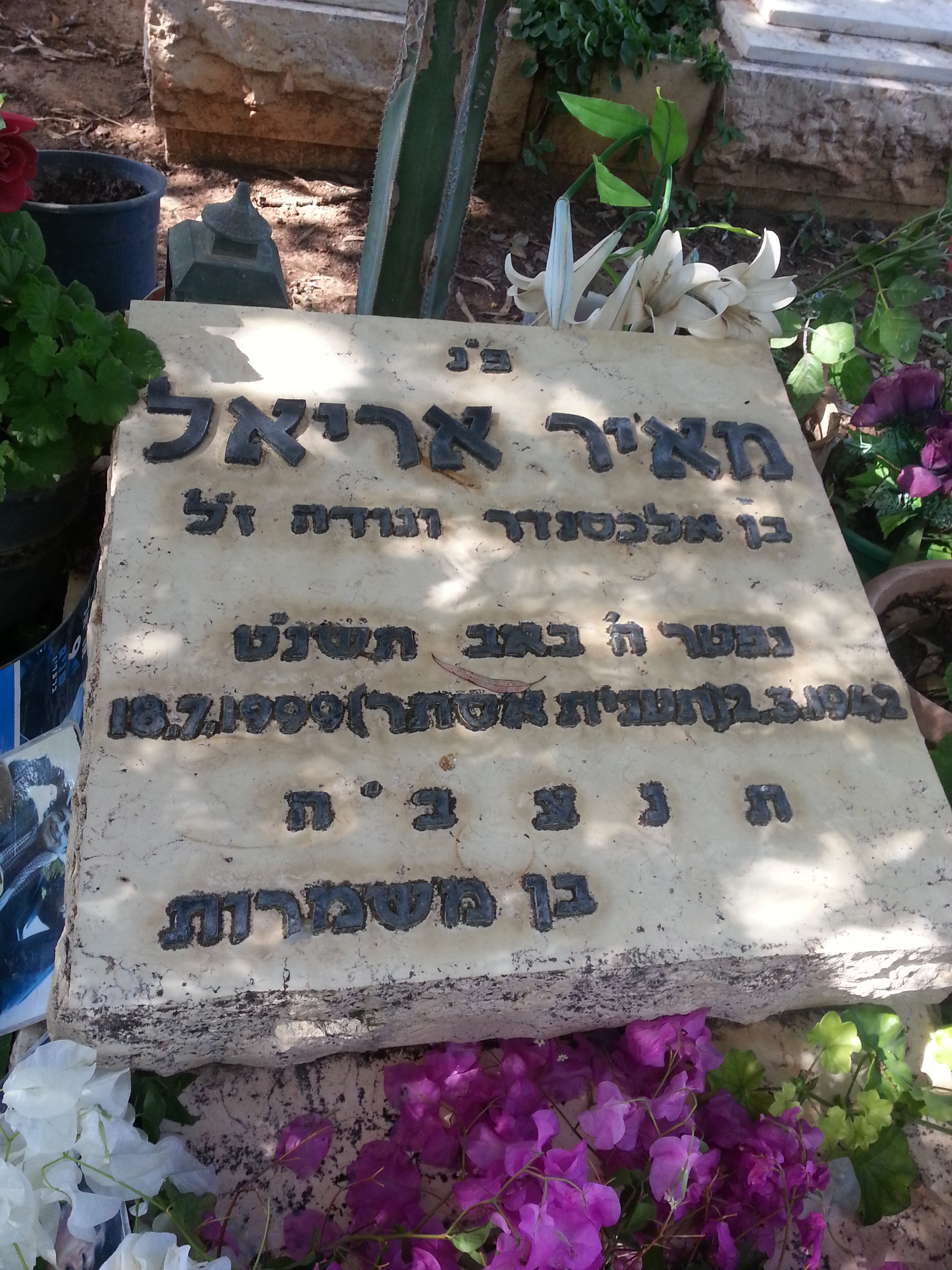
Gravestone over Meir Ariel's tomb, in Mishmarot cemetery.

Since Meir Ariel's death, his family, especially his wife Tirtza, has been carrying out activities to commemorate him and preserve his musical legacy.

One of the main initiatives in the attempt to commemorate him is the production of tribute concerts featuring his songs to mark the anniversary of his death and its vicinity. The first event of this kind, called "Facing the Sea", took place in July 2000, marking the first anniversary of his death, at the Caesarea Theater. The initiative of performances in memory of Ariel continues since then, and three of the performances have been released on CDs. Ariel's sons, Shahar and Ehud, performed his songs for a while under the name "The Ariel Brothers" and even released an album of original material in 2006 under that name.

Ariel's family exposed his legacy to various artists. In the legacy, many songs that were never revealed before were uncovered, and a significant portion of them were without musical accompaniment. As part of the exposure of the song collection, many songs from the legacy were composed and recorded by different singers.

Ariel's legacy includes, among other things, personal recordings of Ariel performing songs he wrote (singing and playing the guitar). These recordings served as the basis for producing the "Mode Ani" album.

On April 22 2009, the Israeli Stamp Service issued a series of 12 postal stamps on the subject of Israeli music. One of the stamps in this collection was dedicated in memory of Ariel. The stamp, with a portrait of Ariel, was designed by the artist Miri Nestor Sofer. The stamp's tab included a line from Ariel's song "Yaldati Sheli" (My Child) - "My child don't walk by yourself".

In October 2016, the biography "Arol Ehad" by Prof. Nissim Calderon was published by Kinneret Zmora-Bitan Dvir.

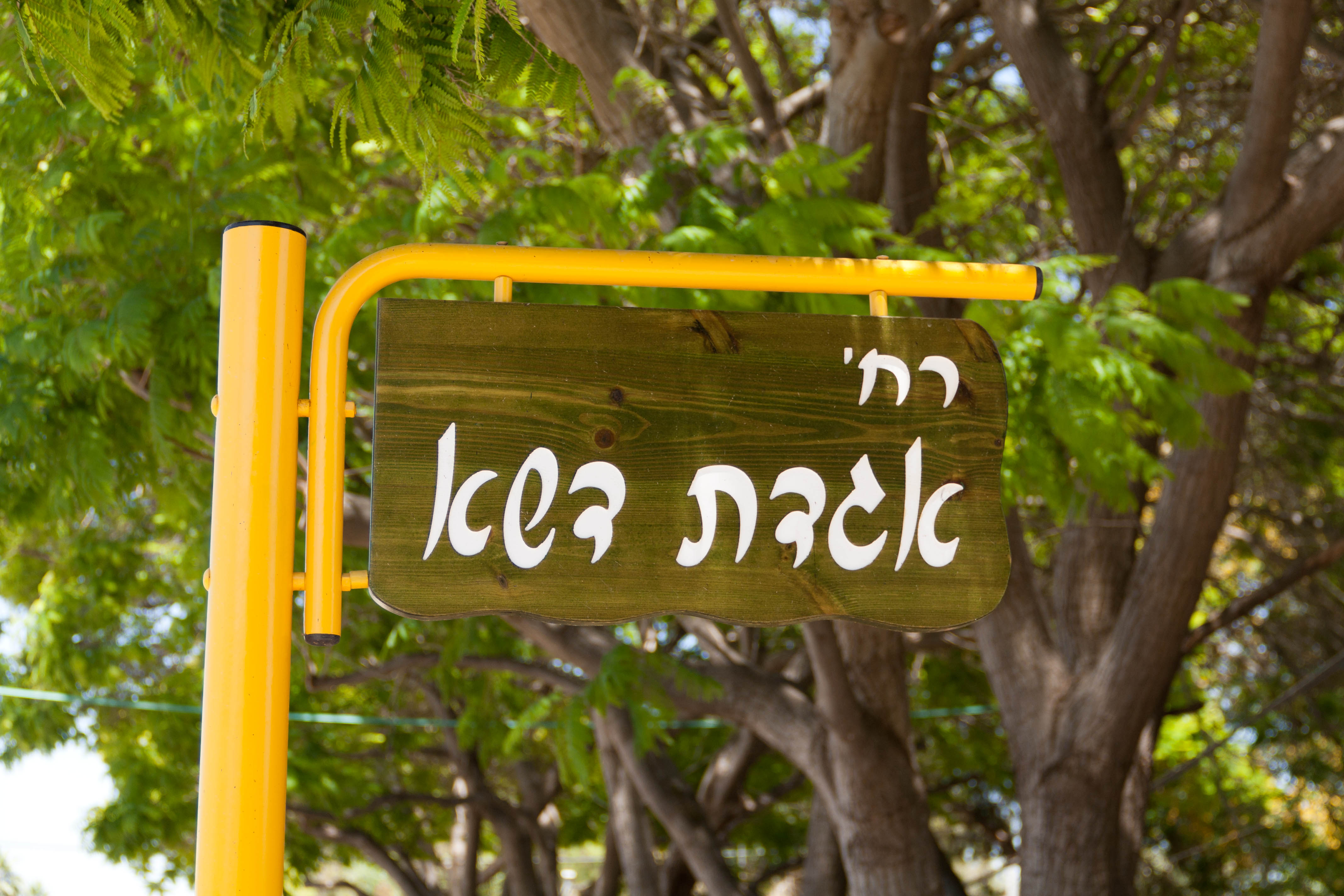
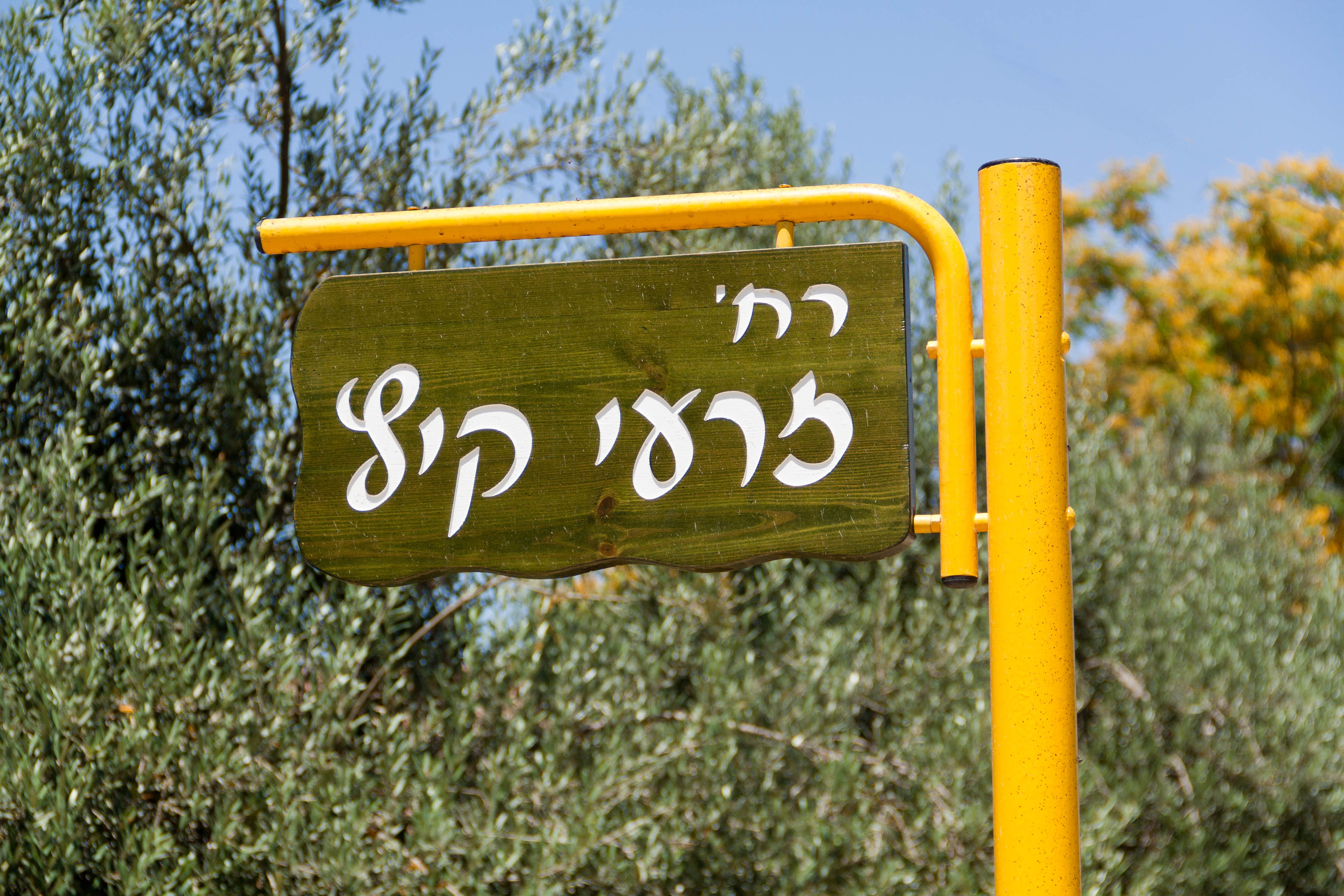
Signs in Ometz, Israel of streets named after songs composed by Meir Ariel. Left: "Agadat Deshe" (translation: Lawn Legend), Right: "Zirei Kayitz" (translation: Seeds of Summer)

In 2019, Meir Ariel's family released the book "Dr. Hithakmut", a book that brings together songs, letters, and illustrations from Meir Ariel's unpublished works. Streets named after him exist in the cities of Kfar Saba, Netanya, Ramla, and in the settlement of Beit Aryeh. In the moshav, streets were named after two of Meir Ariel's songs.

The Tel Aviv municipality placed a memorial plaque on the wall of Meir Ariel's house at 70 Hayarkon Street. In 2023, he received credit for "Ktonet Pasim 2023", indicating that his style influenced the updated version.

An Art and Music exhibition dedicated to Ariel was held at Beit Gabriel from July to August 2024.

A commemoration concert for Ariel will be held at Yarkon Park in September 2024, featuring singers Ninet Tayeb, Shalom Hanoch, Aviv Gefen, Rona Kenan, Shlomi Shaban and others.

== Discography ==
=== Albums ===
- Shirey Chag Umoed Venofel (Songs of holiday and falling commemorative day) 1978
- ...Ugluy Eynayim (...And With Eyes Revealed) 1984
- Yerukot (Green) 1988
- Zir'ey Kayitz (Seeds of Summer) 1993
- Rishumey Pecham (Coal Sketches) 1995
- Bernard Velouise (Bernard and Louise) 1997
- Mode Ani (I Thank/I confess) 2000

=== EPs ===
- Yerushalayim Shel Barzel (Jerusalem of Iron) 1967
- Avarnu Et Par'o (We overcame Pharaoh) 1990

=== Best of albums ===
- Mivchar (Selection) 1991
- Haosef (The Collection) 2001
- Hameytav (The Best of Meir Ariel) 2004

=== Live albums ===
- Dlatot Niftachot Me'atzman (with the band, 'Charisma') (Doors Are Opened By Themselves) 1998
- Behofa'a Acharona Bemoadon Barby 1999 (On a Last Concert At The Barby Club 1999) 2002

=== Tribute live albums ===
- Im Hagav Layam (With My Back To The Sea) 2000
- Erev Kachol Amok (Deep Blue Evening) 2002
- Chamesh Shanim (Five Years) 2005

== Videography ==
- Masa Habchirot Shel Meir Ariel (Meir Ariel's Campaign Tour) 1988
- Derech Dim'a Shkufa – Hahofa'a (Through a Clear Tear – The Show) 2003

== Books ==
Ariel, who once called himself "the talking singer", was a man of words. This is reflected in his outstanding songs, characterized by wit, irony, and metaphors that elevate his poetry to the highest level. Ariel's writing was influenced by figures such as Hayim Nahman Bialik, Nathan Alterman, Yehuda Amichai, Leonard Cohen, Shai Agnon, and Bob Dylan. In addition to lyrically rich songs on his albums, Ariel also published his writings in poetry and prose books:

- Meir Ariel - Songs (1987). A book of poems containing songs by Ariel written before the release of the album "Yerukot," including some songs that were later featured on the album. The songs are accompanied by melodies composed by Ariel himself, and the musical notation was provided by Yehuda Eder.
- Neshel Hanahash (the snake's slough) (1991).
- Greetings and Eulogies (2005). A book primarily containing blessings and elegies written by Ariel throughout his life, reflecting his unique writing style. The book was published with the assistance of Shomera Publishing and can be obtained at the Ariel family home in Pardes Hanna.
- "Independent in the Field" (2010). Over a decade after Meir Ariel's death, the book "Independent in Space" was released, containing all of Meir Ariel's lyrical songs published over the years. The book also includes biographical passages about him and photographs from his life.
- "Writings" (2016). The book includes interpretations of a variety of his songs.
