= Koren =

Koren is a surname or given name, which has multiple origins. Koren may be a variant of the German occupational surname Korn, meaning a dealer in grain. In Slavic-speaking countries, it is a surname derived from a word meaning "root"; variants include Kořen (Czech), Koreň (Slovak), Korzeń (Polish), and Koren (Slovene).

Alternatively, the name may be a variant of the Greek female name Kora, which means "maiden". Koren may also be a surname or masculine given name of Hebrew origin, which means "gleaming". The name Koren may refer to:

== Surname ==
- Christiane Koren (1764–1815), Norwegian writer
- Ulrik Vilhelm Koren (1826–1910), Norwegian-American pastor, theologian, and author
- Dani Koren (1945-2024), Israeli politician
- Daniel Koren (born 1984), Israeli musician
- Ed Koren (1935–2023), American writer and cartoonist
- Einar Sand Koren (born 1984), Norwegian handball player
- Elad Koren (born 1968), Israeli football player
- Eliyahu Koren (1907–2001), Israeli graphic artist
- Gal Koren (born 1992), Slovene ice hockey player
- Gideon Koren (born 1947), Canadian pediatrician
- Haim Koren (born 1953), Israeli diplomat
- John Koren (1861–1923) was an American clergyman and U.S. International Prison Commissioner
- Katja Koren (born 1975), Slovene skier
- Kristijan Koren (born 1986), Slovene cyclist
- Leonard Koren, (born 1948), American artist
- Majda Koren (born 1960), Slovene writer
- Matthew Koren (born 1986), American Businessman
- Nurit Koren (born 1960), Israeli politician
- Petter Mørch Koren (1910–2004), Norwegian politician
- Robert Koren (born 1980), Slovene football player
- Steve Koren (born 1966), American screenwriter
- Ziv Koren (born 1970), Israeli photojournalist

== Given name ==
- Koren Jelela (born 1987), Ethiopian runner
- Koren Robinson (born 1980), American football player
- Koren Shadmi (born 1981), Israeli illustrator
- Koren Zailckas (born 1980), American writer
- Jada Pinkett Smith (born 1971 as Jada Koren Pinkett), American Actress

== See also ==
- Coren
