= David Tartakover =

Israeli graphic designer and political activist (1944–2025)

- דוד טרטקובר
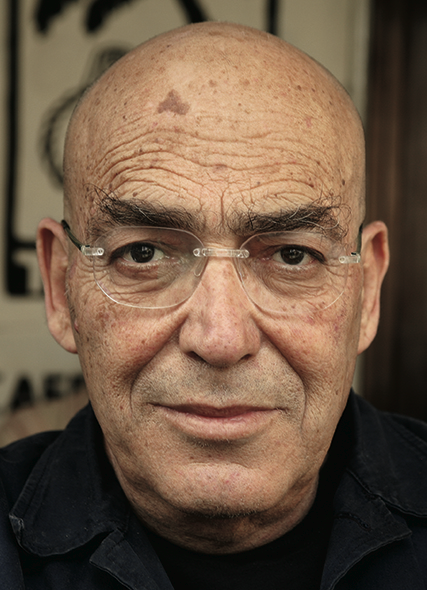
- Tartakover in 2000
- Born: 29 January 1944; Haifa, Mandatory Palestine
- Died: 29 July 2025 (aged 81)
- Education: Bezalel Academy of Arts and Design; London College of Printing
- Known for: Graphic design, printmaking

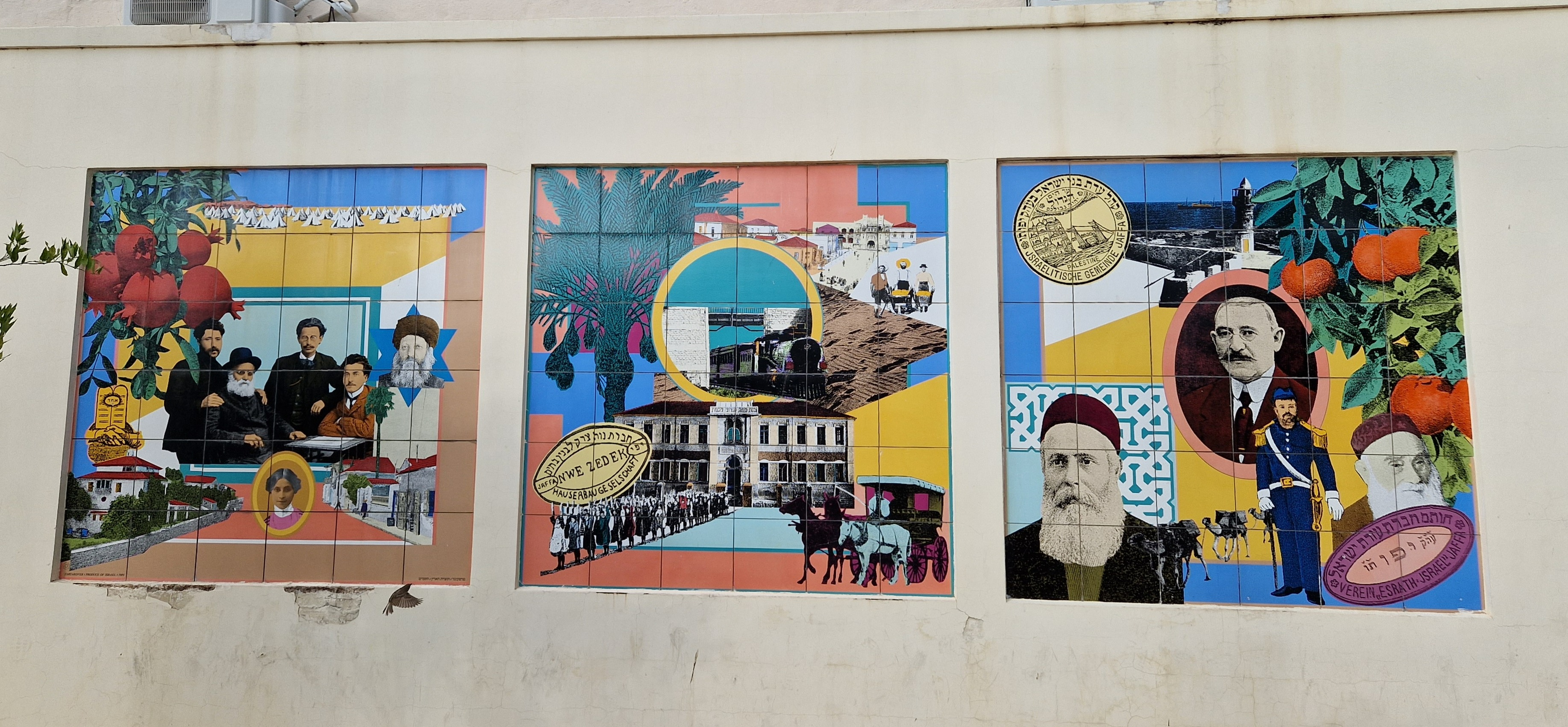
A mural in the Suzan Dalal Center, Tel Aviv (1988-9)

David Tartakover (Hebrew: דוד טרטקובר; 29 January 1944 – 29 July 2025) was an Israeli graphic designer and political activist.

== Background ==
David Tartakover was born in Haifa on 29 January 1944. His father, Dr. Jacob Tartakover, was a lawyer. His mother, Alexandra Shulamit Tarkatover (née Gluckstein), was a teacher and the sister of Tony Cliff. When he was four, the family moved to Jerusalem, where he attended the Hebrew University High School. Between 1962 and 1964, he served in the Israel Defense Forces in the Paratroopers Brigade. He later fought as a reservist in the 1973 Yom Kippur War. Tartakover studied at the Bezalel Academy of Arts and Design, and was a graduate of the London College of Printing.

Tartakover died from complications of Parkinson's disease on July 29, 2025, at the age of 81.

== Artistic career ==
In 1975, Tartakover opened a studio in Tel Aviv specializing in various aspects of visual communications with an emphasis on culture and politics.

From 1976, Tartakover was a senior lecturer in the Visual Communication Department of the Bezalel Academy, was a member of Alliance Graphique Internationale (AGI), and was a president of the Graphic Designers Association of Israel (GDAI).

He established a reputation for a series of politically provocative self-produced posters, some at the time of Rosh Hashanah (the Jewish new year). His compositions were driven more by content or themes than by high aesthetics. He described his work as a "seismograph" and "a way of reacting to events... to alter opinions and attitudes".

Peace Now logo

Tartakover designed Peace Now's logo in 1978. The logo emerged from a poster created by Tartakover for a mass rally, held in what is now Rabin Square in Tel Aviv on April 1, 1978, titled "Peace Now." It became the name of the organization, the first political bumper sticker in Israel and it is still one of Israel's most popular stickers. Tartakover, commenting in 2006, said "The movement activists liked the logo, [b]ut they thought there should also be a symbol. I told them it wasn't needed - this is the symbol. It took time until they understood that this was the first political sticker in Israel." The logo combines two typefaces, "Shalom" (peace) in black traditional Koren Bible Type (designed by Eliyahu Koren) and "Achshav" (now) in the red headline-style Haim Type (designed by Jan Le Witt).

He described himself as "a local designer," meaning that the subjects he tackles concern Israel. He followed the mantra of Hebrew expressionist poet Avigdor Hameiri (b. Andor Feuerstein): "Freedom of opinion is not a right but a duty". Influences on Tartakover's work stem from Gustav Klutsis, John Heartfield, Alexander Rodchenko, Ben Shahn, and Andy Warhol. He claimed that his mentor was comic-book artist Bob Gill and that best work is the Hebrew-lettered "Peace Now" logo. Tatakover was one of the most prominent Israeli graphic designers; others include Franz Kraus (1905–1998), Gabriel and Maxim Shamir (1909–1992, 1910–1990), and Dan Reisinger (1934–2019).

== Solo exhibitions ==
Tokyo Designers Space Open Gallery (1982); "Produce of Israel" (1984), Israel Museum, Jerusalem; "Produce of Israel" (1985), Tel Aviv Museum of Art; "Proclamation of the Independence" (1988), Israel Museum, Jerusalem; Espace Floréal, Paris, France (1994); Festival d'affiches, Chaumont, France (1995); Plakatmuseum am Niederrhein, Germany (1997); Passage de Retz, Paris, France (1998); DDD Gallery, Osaka, Japan (1998); Arc en Rêve, Centre d'architecture, Bordeaux, France (1998), Les Rencontres d'Arles festival, France, 2005.

== Awards and recognition ==
In 2002, Tartakover was awarded the Israel Prize, for design. The judges said, "His unique work creates a synthesis between popular and high culture, between the written text and visual imagery, and between personal statements and collective representations of local cultural values. As a creator, teacher, and an active member of the community for over thirty years, he has influenced the language of visual representation in Israel."

His work won numerous awards and prizes and is included in the collections of museums in Europe, United States and Japan.

Prizes include the Gold medal, 8th Poster Biennale (1989), Lahti, Finland; second prize at the Salon of Photography (1990), Kalish, Poland; honourable mention, Helsinki International Poster Biennale (1997); bronze medal, 17th International Poster Biennale (2000), Warsaw; second prize, 13th International Poster Biennale (2001), Lahti, Finland.

- Sandberg Prize recipient

== See also ==
- Visual arts in Israel
- List of Israel Prize recipients
