= Waiting for the Messiah (album) =

- Cover by David Tartakover

Studio album by Shalom Hanoch
- Released: March 25, 1985
- Recorded: December 1984-January 1985
- Studios: Kolinor Studios; Syntron Studio
- Genre: Rock
- Length: 45:09
- Language: Hebrew
- Label: CBS Israel Records
- Producers: Shalom Hanoch, Moshe Levi, Eti Ante

Waiting for the Messiah (Hebrew: מחכים לְמָשיח, romanized: Mehakim LeMashiach) is the fifth solo studio album by Israeli singer-songwriter Shalom Hanoch, released on March 25, 1985, on CBS Israel Records.

Following the commercial failures of his previous two albums, White Wedding and On the Face of the Earth, Hanoch returned to record his next album with his collaborator Moshe Levi, who had previously produced his fourth studio album On the Face of the Earth. However, CBS Israel Records gave Hanoch a much smaller budget to record the album, leading to it being primarily recorded at Syntron Studio, which was under construction at the time. Despite the setbacks, the album and its subsequent lead single were both released to critical acclaim and commercial success, with the album selling 15,000 copies in half a year.

Waiting for the Messiah's songs were inspired by the sociopolitical state of Israel during the 1980s, with the 1982 Lebanon War and the 1983 Israel bank stock crisis in particular being sources of inspiration for some of its songs.

Waiting for the Messiah has remained one of Hanoch's most acclaimed albums, with it being frequently ranked as one of the greatest albums in the history of Israeli music.

== Background and songs ==
Due to a combination of Hanoch's lack of commercial success and Israel's poor economic state at the time due to the 1983 Israel bank stock crisis, Hanoch's record label, CBS Israel Records, gave him a budget of 20,000$ to record his fifth studio album. Hanoch recruited his collaborator Moshe Levi to help produce the album, but Eti Ante also helped with producing the album and helping to conserve the budget for its production. To do this, the album's recordings were moved from Kolinor Studios to the then-under-construction Syntron Studio. Only two songs, "This isn't nice" and "Undisputed" were recorded in Kolinor and were initially meant to be released as non-album singles. However, shortly afterwards, Hanoch wrote "Waiting for the Messiah", "Not Stopping at Red Lights", and "Escaping the Stress", which helped form the basis of the album. The album was one of the first Israeli albums to make use of sampling, though this was a tedious and laborious process. The album was recorded between December 1984 and January 1985.

=== Songs ===
==== "This isn't Nice" ====
"This isn't Nice" was the first song recorded for the album. Hanoch wrote it as a response to the backlash he received for his third album, White Wedding. Specifically, he targeted it at fans who missed the "good and old Shalom Hanoch".

==== "Not Stopping at Red Lights" ====
"Not Stopping at Red Lights" was written about the 1982 Lebanon War, and was inspired by Hanoch's anger at the lack of activism done against the war.

==== "Déja Vu" ====
"Déja Vu" was written as a parody of the Latin music that was popular in Israel at the time, and it was also written as a more radio-friendly love song.

=== Cover art ===
The album's cover art was designed by David Tartakover and depicts an ashtray full of cigarettes. The design came after Hanoch stated that he was tired of each album cover having his likeness on it.

== Reception and legacy ==
Waiting for the Messiah was released on March 25, 1985. Reviews of the album were positive, with critics praising the album's political messages, although Hanoch has maintained that he never intended for that. It sold 10,000 copies less than a month after its release.

Following its release, Hanoch embarked on a national tour, performing at venues such as the Yarkon Park in Tel Aviv and the Sultan's Pool in Jerusalem. Hanoch was also compared to Bruce Springsteen during the coverage of the tour, due to the album's perceived similarities by critics to Springsteen's then-contemporary album Born in the U.S.A. These concerts attracted crowds of tens of thousands of people, an unusual amount back then. Hanoch also performed on Channel 1 during the tour, with his performance being funded by Ehud Manor. In total, 90,000 people attended Hanoch's tour. The album has gone on to sell 70,000 copies, making it Hanoch's second-best-selling album.

Waiting for the Messiah has remained one of Hanoch's most acclaimed albums, with it being frequently ranked as one of the greatest albums in the history of Israeli music. In 2025, in honor of the album's 40th anniversary, Hanoch went on another tour with songs from the album, as well as featuring guest performers such as Aviv Geffen and Tuna.

== Track listing ==
All tracks are written by Shalom Hanoch.

Side one
No.	Title	Length
1.	"This isn't Nice"	4:36
2.	"Without Saying a Word"	4:13
3.	"Undisputed"	4:30
4.	"Not Stopping at Red Lights"	4:06
5.	"Déja Vu"	5:27
Total length:		22:52

Side two
No.	Title	Length
1.	"Waiting for the Messiah"	5:47
2.	"Chocolate Milk"	4:04
3.	"Late Sunbeam"	5:42
4.	"Escaping the Stress"	3:59
5.	"Drifted with the Flow"	2:45
Total length:		22:17 (45:09)

== Personnel ==
- Shalom Hanoch-vocals, guitar, guitar solo on "Late Sunbeam", effects, lyrics, compositions, and arrangements.
- Moshe Levi-piano, keyboards, arrangement, and production
- Jaroslav Jakubovič-saxophone
- Alon Hillel-drums
- Ohad Inger-bass guitar
- Haim Romano-guitar
- Backup vocals-Shalom Hanoch, Moshe Levi, and Dafna Armoni
- Gary Eckstein-guitar on "This isn't Nice"
- Yehoshua ben Yehoshua-Synclavier programming
- Naor Dayan-drum machine programming
- Eti Ante-producer
