= Visit Palestine =

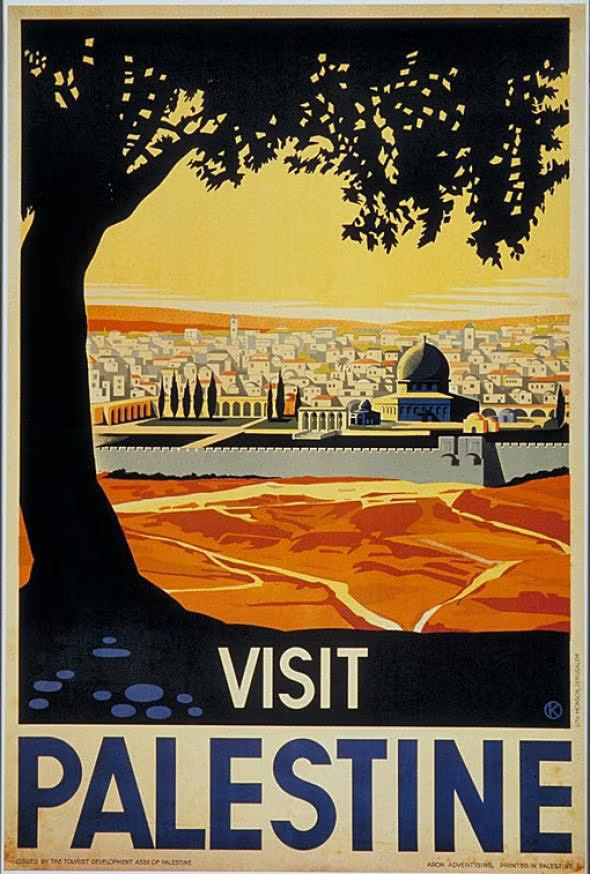
- Artist: Franz Kraus
- Year: 1936
- Movement: Art Deco
- Commissioner: Tourism Development Association of Palestine

Visit Palestine is a 1936 tourism poster designed by Austrian-born Jewish graphic artist Franz Kraus and commissioned by the Zionist-led Tourist Development Association of Palestine during the British Mandate. The Art Deco style poster, designed as part of a wider promotional campaign to encourage tourism and Jewish immigration (aliyah), depicts a view of the Temple Mount in the Old City of Jerusalem from the Mount of Olives, featuring the Dome of the Rock and framed by the silhouette of an olive tree.

After falling out of circulation, the poster was revived by Israeli artist David Tartakover, who republished it in 1994 with the permission of Kraus. The poster quickly became a popular fixture in Palestinian homes, books, and tourism shops in the West Bank and Jerusalem.
