= Erika Brown =

Erika Brown may refer to:

- Erika Brown (curler) (born 1973), American curler
- Erika Brown (swimmer) (born 1998), American swimmer

== See also ==
- Erica Brown, American writer and educator
