= Koren Siddur =

Siddurim published by Koren Publishers Jerusalem

The Koren Siddur refers to a family of siddurim published by Koren Publishers Jerusalem beginning in 1981.

Eliyahu Koren began work on a new prayerbook in the 1970s. Koren created Koren Book Type for the project. Rather than allow the text to run continuously across page turns, Koren maintained lines and paragraphs within individual pages. He set individual sentences line by line, according to their meaning. The result was a prayerbook published in 1981. The siddur became one of the most widely used Hebrew-only prayerbooks. In 2009, Koren Publishers Jerusalem introduced a new Hebrew/English edition of the Koren Siddur, the Koren Sacks Siddur (below), with an introduction, translation, and commentary by the Orthodox Ashkenazi Chief Rabbi of the United Hebrew Congregations of the Commonwealth, Lord Jonathan Sacks. More recently, Koren Publishers Jerusalem released the Koren Shalem Siddur, which built upon both the previously released Koren Sacks and original Koren Siddurs. The new Shalem Siddur contained all Torah readings, the Five Megillot, and personal supplications (tehinot).

== Koren Siddurim ==
Eliyahu Koren's philosophy regarding the siddur can be summed up in his statement that, "The prayers are presented in a style that does not encourage habit and hurry, but rather inspires the worshipper to engage both mind and heart in prayer." The Koren Siddur thus employs a poetry-line format in many of the included prayers.

== Koren Sacks Siddur ==
The Koren Sacks Siddur is the Hebrew–English edition of the Koren Siddur, edited and annotated by Chief Rabbi of the British Commonwealth Jonathan Sacks and designed and typesest by Raphaël Freeman. The translation and commentary are based on Rabbi Sacks' edition of the UK's Authorised Daily Prayer Book.

It was first published in 2009, beginning Koren's entry into the English-language siddur market. The siddur has also found an audience with non-Orthodox Jews.

While on a speaking tour in the United States to promote the siddur in May 2009, Sacks told The Baltimore Sun that he aimed for a "new, simple, straightforward, . . . reasonably lucid translation—one that captured a little of the rhythms of the Hebrew itself and gave a little of the poetry of the more poetic prayers". He said that his commentary is intended to "shed some light on the inner logic of the prayers",

=== Differences from other Orthodox siddurim ===
- The translation and commentary, although based on the Authorized Daily Prayer Book (Minhag Anglia - the tradition of Great Britain), has been reworked by Rabbi Sacks and a team of translators from Koren. The prayers follow the Koren tradition, including prayers not present in previous UK Singer siddurim.
- There are some differences of nusach (liturgical choices) and instructions, as this siddur is for a North American readership. The Ashkenazi rite of Orthodox and Conservative Jews in the United States and Canada differs slightly from that of Orthodox and Conservative Jews in the United Kingdom.
- Includes prayers for the government and armed forces.
- More extensive prayers for holidays, including Ushpizin, Akdamut, Kaparot, Viduy and Selihot
- Prayers intended for the reader to use while praying in the State of Israel.
- The Koren Siddur is the first Orthodox siddur to be endorsed by the Jewish Orthodox Feminist Alliance (JOFA). Prayers are included for the birth of a daughter, for women to recite, after birth, when they return to synagogue; has prayers for women to constitute a quorum for grace after meals; prayers said traditionally only with male grammar ("Modeh Ani") now have feminine and masculine options.

Koren Publishers Jerusalem followed up on The Koren Sacks Siddur with the publication of The Koren Sacks Rosh HaShana Mahzor in 2011, The Koren Sacks Yom Kippur Mahzor in 2012, The Koren Sacks Pesah Mahzor in 2013, the Koren Yom Ha'atzmaut and Yom Yerushalayim Mahzor in 2014, The Koren Sacks Sukkot Mahzor in 2015, and The Koren Sacks Shavuot Mahzor in 2016.

== See also ==
- Siddur Rinat Yisrael
