= Koren Publishers Jerusalem =

Israeli publishing house

- Founded: 1962
- Founder: Eliyahu Koren
- Headquarters location: Jerusalem, Israel
- Distribution: North America, UK, South Africa, Australia
- Imprints: Maggid Books, The Toby Press (see below)
- Official website: https://korenpub.com

Koren Publishers Jerusalem is an Israeli publisher of Jewish religious texts. It was established in 1961 by Eliyahu Koren, with the aim of publishing the first Hebrew Bible designed, edited, printed, and bound by Jews in nearly 500 years. It produced The Koren Bible in 1962, The Koren Siddur in 1981, and the Koren Sacks Siddur in 2009, in addition to numerous editions of these books and other religious texts in Hebrew, English, and other languages.

== History ==
Koren Publishers Jerusalem was founded in 1961 by Eliyahu Koren, who sought to publish the first Hebrew Bible designed, edited, printed, and bound by Jews in nearly 500 years. The first printed Hebrew Bibles from Italy (1488) were printed by Jews, but after Daniel Bomberg’s 1517 Venice printing, all editions up to the 20th century had non-Jewish publishers or printers, and errors had found their way into the text.

The text, vocalization, and cantillation for The Koren Bible were based on an early 19th-century Bible edition of German-Jewish grammarian and masoretic scholar Wolf Heidenheim. Koren created a new font, Koren Bible Type, for the project, developed a graphic layout that allowed for the unity of the Hebrew type, and corrected numerous errors of earlier editions. The Torah, the first part of The Koren Bible, was published in 1962, during the Chanukah holiday. The entire Bible followed nearly two years later.

The Koren Bible quickly gained wide acceptance among many different Jewish communities. It is the edition accepted by the Chief Rabbinate of Israel for reading the Haftara (prophetic portions) in synagogues when the handwritten parchment scroll is not used, and, until the introduction of the Jerusalem Crown, was the Bible on which the President of Israel is sworn into office. Koren Publishers Jerusalem later introduced a Hebrew/English edition of the Bible with a translation by Biblical and literary scholar Professor Harold Fisch.

However, the quality of the text has been criticized by scholars. For example, Moshe Goshen-Gottstein said: "Since he was aware of his lack in masoretic expertise, he sought the help of three scholars, all of who suffered from the same lack of masoretic expertise ... while the publisher made persistent claims that this was the first edition set and printed in their old/new homeland, this was, in fact ... hardly an edition like that of Dotan, but another rehash of the material prepared by ben Hayim."

Koren Publishers Jerusalem went on to publish other Jewish religious texts, including a Passover Haggada, Five Megillot, and The Koren Siddur (Prayerbook), introduced in 1981, which featured a new font, Koren Book Type, to maximize legibility, and a new graphic layout to facilitate proper reading, reinforce the inner meaning of the text, and create an elegant overall appearance.

Koren Publishers Jerusalem continues to publish a wide variety of Jewish religious texts in Hebrew, English, and other languages.

Since 2007, the publisher has been Matthew Miller. Rabbi Reuven Ziegler serves as Chairman of the Editorial board.

== Primary publications ==
=== Koren Sacks Siddur ===
In 2009, Koren published its first Hebrew/English prayerbook, The Koren Siddur. This prayer book is based on The Koren Siddur and with an English introduction, translation, and commentary by Rabbi Jonathan Sacks, Chief Rabbi of the United Hebrew Congregations of the British Commonwealth. It is the only Orthodox siddur that includes prayers for the state of Israel, its soldiers and national holidays, and a halakhic guide for visitors; prayers following childbirth and upon the birth of a daughter; and citations of modern authorities. Upon its release, the siddur was "widely celebrated among Modern Orthodox Jews". The Koren Sacks Siddur is published with the Orthodox Union.

=== Koren Talmud Bavli ===
In May 2012, Koren launched the Koren Talmud Bavli, a bilingual edition of the Talmud with translation and commentary by Rabbi Adin Steinsaltz. The layout features side-by-side English/Aramaic translation, maps, diagrams and explanatory notes based on Rabbi Steinsaltz's original Hebrew commentary on the Talmud. The project was hailed by Commentary Magazine as "a landmark in making the text accessible to the millions of Jews whose native (and often only) tongue is English." Subsequently, the Jewish Book Council named the Koren Talmud Bavli a 2012 National Jewish Book Award winner in the category of Modern Jewish Thought and Experience. Rabbi Tzvi Hersh Weinreb serves as the Editor-in-Chief of the Koren Talmud Bavli. Rabbi Shalom Z. Berger serves as Senior Content Editor.

=== Koren Magerman Educational Siddur Series ===
In May 2014, Koren, along with Yeshiva University, announced the launch of a new series of siddurim with "a new approach to tefilla (prayer) education in the school, home, and synagogue." The series editor is educator Daniel Rose, PhD. The Koren Children’s Siddur is an illustrated prayer book intended for early elementary grades (ages 5–7). It was designed to encourage and facilitate children’s engagement in the prayer experience. The Koren Ani Tefilla Weekday Siddur was developed for the inquiring high school student and thoughtful adult. It features a unique layout and multi-tier commentary by Rabbi Jay Goldmintz, EdD, along with explanations, reflective questions, FAQs on Jewish prayer and spirituality based on real questions collected by Rabbi Goldmintz's students, alumni and colleagues.

== Divisions and imprints ==
=== Maggid Books ===
Created in 2009, Maggid publishes books that offer contemporary approaches to traditional Jewish texts and themes. The imprint stands on three pillars: scholarship, loyalty to Jewish tradition, and popular appeal. In recent years, Maggid has published works by well-known Jewish thinkers such as former Chief Rabbi of the UK Rabbi Jonathan Sacks, Rabbi Joseph B. Soloveitchik, Rabbi Adin Steinsaltz, Rabbi Shlomo Riskin, Rabbi Berel Wein, Erica Brown and others.

The imprint has partnerships with a number of Jewish institutions including Yeshivat Har Etzion, Yeshiva University, Rabbi Shlomo Riskin's Ohr Torah Stone Institutions, Pardes Institute of Jewish Studies, and the City of David. Its acclaimed series include Norman Lamm’s Derashot LeDorot: A Commentary for the Ages, Torah MiEtzion: New Readings in Tanakh, Torah Lights by Shlomo Riskin, and the Maggid Studies in Tanakh.

The Torah MiEtzion series presents essays on the five books of the Bible from the rabbis of Yeshivat Har Etzion. The approach of the series is "centered on learning the 'simple meaning' of the text but also incorporating the disciplines of literary theory, geography, archeology and history in order to better understand the text." The series "resurrected and revolutionized the study of the Torah."

The Maggid Studies in Tanakh series explores the texts, themes, and personalities of the Bible through both classic rabbinic interpretation and modern scholarly investigation. Featuring English translations, timelines and maps, the first two books in the series — "Jeremiah: The Fate of a Prophet" by Binyamin Lau and "I Kings: Torn in Two" by Alex Israel — reveal hidden layers of meaning in these ancient texts for a contemporary audience. A companion to the scriptural text, Israel's study of remains faithful to I Kings even as it rises above a strictly technical understanding and establishes this oft-overlooked segment of the canon as highly relevant for the modern world. Lau's volume on Jeremiah, available in both Hebrew and English, is "a very lucid and readable book that...challenges us to grapple with our understanding of one of our most beloved prophets who was charged with a terrible message." The third volume, "Joshua: The Challenge of the Promised Land" by Michael Hattin, will be published in July 2014.

In February 2013, Maggid Books "set an all-time record" at the Jerusalem International Book Fair as it launched the book, "Radical Responsibility: Celebrating the Thought of Chief Rabbi Lord Jonathan Sacks". More than 1,000 guests came to hear Rabbi Jonathan Sacks, Rabbi Dr. Binyamin Lau and Professor Moshe Halbertal address the topic of leadership.

=== Toby Press ===
Created in 1999, The Toby Press publishes literary fiction, non-fiction and poetry on Jewish and Israeli themes. It is also the US distributor for Koren Publishers Jerusalem.

== Awards and honors ==
The house was commended by The Jewish Week for its "fastidiously accurate and aesthetically sensitive presentation of the Hebrew Scriptures and the prayer book."

In December 2012, the Israel Postal Authority issued an official postage stamp honoring the 50th anniversary of the Koren Jerusalem Bible.

In addition, a number of publications under Koren Publishers Jerusalem have received honors from the Jewish Book Council, known as "the longest running awards program of its kind in the field of Jewish literature and is recognized as the most prestigious."

- (2013) National Jewish Book Award Winner – Koren Sacks Pesah Mahzor, ISBN 978 965 301 3186
- (2012) National Jewish Book Award Winner – Koren Talmud Bavli, ISBN 978 965 301 5630
- (2011) National Jewish Book Award Finalist – Koren Sacks Rosh HaShana Mahzor, ISBN 978 965 301 3421
- (2010) National Jewish Book Award Winner – Mesorat HaRav Kinot (with the Orthodox Union), ISBN 978 965 301 2493
- (2009) National Jewish Book Award Winner – Covenant & Conversation, Rabbi Jonathan Sacks, ISBN 978 159 264 0201
- (2004) National Jewish Book Award – The Blessing of a Broken Heart, Sherri Mandell, ISBN 978 159 264 1512
