= Shalom Hanoch =

Israeli musician (born 1946)

Shalom Hanoch שלום חנוך
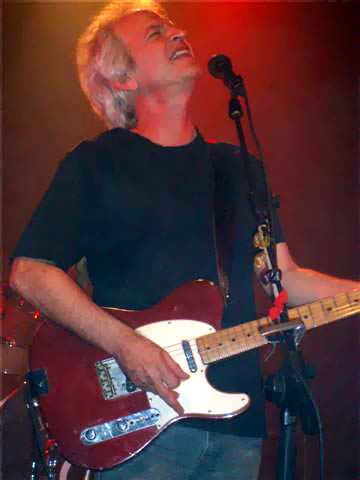
- Hanoch in 2007

Background information
- Born: 1 September 1946 (age 80)
- Origin: Kibbutz Mishmarot, Mandatory Palestine (now Israel)
- Genres: Rock, hard rock
- Instruments: Guitar; Recorder; Mandolin
- Years active: 1967–Present
- Labels: DJM; NMC / CBS; Hed Artzi; The Eighth Note

Shalom Hanoch (Hebrew: שלום חנוך; born 1 September 1946) is an Israeli rock singer, lyricist and composer.

He is considered one of the founders of Israeli rock and modern Israeli music in general, both of which have been profoundly influenced by his work. His collaboration with Arik Einstein produced some of the first Israeli rock albums. He is often referred to as "The King of Israeli Rock".

== Biography ==
Shalom Hanoch was born in Mishmarot in 1946, roughly 16 months before the establishment of the state of Israel. His musical talent as a child was recognised in the kibbutz, where he began to play, sing, and compose his first songs. Before discovering rock music, he was exposed to a wide variety of genres (from Classical, through Russian folk music, Gospel, to Blues).

== Musical career ==
Hanoch began writing and composing music after getting his first jazz guitar from his dad when he was around 12 years old. By 14, he had completed his first song, Laila (Night). He continued writing lyrics and music with another member of the Kibbutz, singer-songwriter Meir Ariel. Hanoch and Ariel joined the Kibbutz's band, HaMishmaron in their teens. Songs from that time include classics such as Agadat Deshe (Grass Legend), Nisa LaYam (We'll Go To The Beach), Risim (Eyelashes) and Yom Acharon (Last Day). At 16, Hanoch enrolled to Beit Tzvi School for Performing Arts, where he developed a passion for acting. While at Beit Tzvi, Hanoch was influenced by the Beatles.

In 1966, after being initially rejected, Hanoch was recruited for the Israeli military ensembles Lehakat Ha'nahal of Nahal. Hanoch became a prominent ensemble member, contributing vocals and performing nationwide. While in the military ensemble, Hanoch continued to write and compose songs for the ensemble and other artists. Hanoch took part in the recording of 'the best of' album, in which new versions to 1950s and 1960s hits were re-recorded by the ensemble. The album's title is Kol HaKavod LaNahal (Well Done, Nahal). In this album, Hanoch sang Mitria Bishnaim along with the band's female star, Shula Chen, who later became a well-known TV and stage actress. After completing his military service in 1968, Hanoch married Lihi and left the Kibbutz.

In 1967, Shalom performed with The High Windows in Tel Aviv. It was there that he was introduced to Arik Einstein, who was already a star in Israel. Impressed with what he had seen and heard, Einstein suggested that Hanoch write songs for him. A first EP, Hagar, was released the same year, with four of Hanoch's compositions performed by Einstein.

Hanoch's breakthrough occurred in 1968 when Arik Einstein recorded his second album, Mazal Gdi (Capricorn), that contained only songs written by Hanoch. Hanoch also wrote the lyrics for six of the album's songs. The cooperation between the two continued in the Israel Song Festival (Festival HaZemer), where Einstein performed Hanoch's songs. However, the complex, unusual song "Prague," which dealt with the Soviet invasion of the capital of the Czech Republic, was not well-received by the audience. In 1969, Hanoch and his former Nahal military ensemble member, Chanan Yovel, joined with Benny Amdursky and founded the band HaShlosharim. Shalom composed many of the band's songs. Hanoch also continued writing for other artists during this period.

In 1970, Arik Einstein, Shalom Hanoch and The Churchills introduced a new sound influenced by Anglo-American Rock n' Roll to the Israeli music scene. The album Shablul, in which Hanoch composed all the songs, pioneered this new sound. One of the best-known songs from this album was Ma Ata Ose KsheAta Kam Baboker (What Do You Do When You Wake Up in the Morning). The 'Churchills', who played on most of the songs, were influenced by the Psychedelic rock of the late 1960s, and this kind of psychedelia appeared in some of their songs. Shablul's lyrics demonstrated another innovative dimension in Israeli music. The lyrics used everyday popular language rather than formal jargon, representing a deviation from the songwriting conventions of that time. 'Shablul' featured many hits, including the more old-style song HaBalada Al Yoel Moshe Salomon (The Ballad About Yoel Moshe Salomon). The album is regarded as a masterpiece, and many of the songs were later covered by artists like Zikney Tzfat and Rockfour.

Plastelina, the second Einstein-Hanoch album, was recorded four months after 'Shablul'. Two more artists who worked with Einstein at that time, Shmulik Kraus and Josie Katz, took part in recording and composing. In the same year, Hanoch wrote and composed a song for Uri Zohar's Hitromemut movie. In 1971, Hanoch flew to London to start an international career.

In London, Shalom signed a contract with producer and music publisher Dick James, who worked with Elton John at that time. In 1971 Hanoch recorded a solo album in English, Shalom. The album was recorded and produced by James' record company, DJM, with Elton John's backing band. The record included songs that were composed by Hanoch in Israel and were translated into English and also included new compositions. A few of these became more famous in Israel several years later, when they were translated into Hebrew and appeared in his solo albums, and in an album by his new band Tamouz. With his return to Israel in 1973 Hanoch claimed he had come back because it was hard for him to succeed in other countries, and writing in English did not suit him. In 1976, the album was released in Israel by CBS and sold out in stores very fast. CBS never produced additional copies of the album, and it was never re-released.

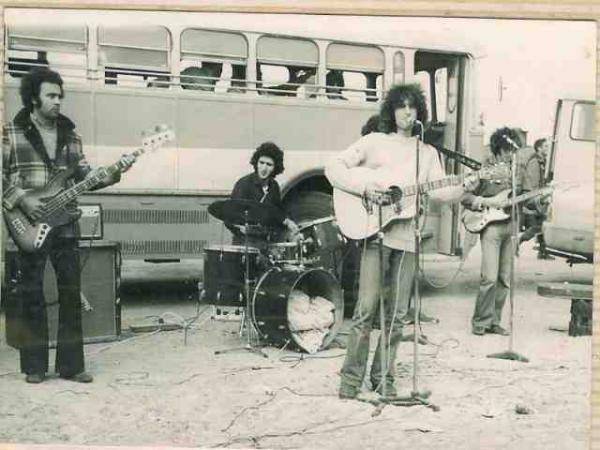
Shalom Hanoch at the microphone, performing for soldiers during the Yom Kippur War (1973)

In 1973, Hanoch returned to Israel. He and Ariel Zilber founded the group Tamouz. With them leading the band, Tamouz became the most significant rock band of the late 1970s in Israel. Tamouz's only album – Sof Onat HaTapuzim (End of the Orange Season)(1976), was a milestone in the development of Israeli Rock and became the preeminent album of its time. Following the album's commercial success, Tamouz went on a tour across Israel. However, the high production costs of their tour led to considerable financial losses for the band. Eventually, Tamouz embarked on a last, successful tour which recouped some of its losses. Tamouz disbanded in 1976 due to its poor finances and Zilber's dissatisfaction with the band's artistic direction. Tamouz reunited for a few tours in 1983 and performed in the memory of Meir Ariel in 2000, a year after his death.

After Tamouz disbanded, Hanoch released his first Hebrew solo album – Adam Betoch Azmo (1977, A Man Inside Himself). The songs were mainly quiet and in minor keys, including Adam Betoch Azmo, Ir Zara (Foreign Town), Tiyul LeYafo (A Trip to Jaffa), and Rak Lirkod (Just Dance). Most of these songs talked about Hanoch's life, after a bitter divorce from his wife. In 1978, Hanoch performed at the Neviot Festival. The performances there were very successful, and made Hanoch an esteemed rock singer. At this time, Hanoch recorded his song – Haya Kedai (It Was Worth It), which was a major success.

In 1979, Arik Einstein and Shalom Hanoch started an elaborately produced joint tour. The performance was recorded in Heichal HaTarbut and was released as Arik Einstein VeShalom Hanoch BeHofa'a Meshutefet. This album contained new songs by Einstein and Hanoch and two medleys (almost 20 minutes long each) of the best songs from their albums in the 1970s.

In 1980, Hanoch produced Einstein's MiShirei Sasha Argov. In the same year, he also wrote and composed Shir Lelo Shem for Yehudit Ravitz, which was written in memory of Shalom's nephew, Avshalom, in November. Hanoch also composed a few songs for Einstein's album Hamush BeMishkafaim (Armed with Glasses), and composed Nurit Galron's very well known song – Ki HaAdam Etz HaSade.

In 1981, Hanoch created one of his most prominent albums – Chatuna Levana (White Wedding). This album differed from Hanoch's previous albums since it was very dark sounding. It was the first time Hanoch sang in the familiar voice of today and not in the tenor of his early career. The songs were complex and dealt with Hanoch's divorce, relationships, money and success. Initially, the album did not achieve commercial success. However, it is now considered one of the greatest rock albums ever recorded in Israel, characterised by a modern, heavy, and rough rock sound.

In 1983 Hanoch recorded the album Al Pnei HaAdama (On the Face of the Earth) about man and nature. The album contained three new songs, and re-recordings of older songs. In 1985, he recorded his most successful album – Mehakim LeMashiach (Waiting for The Messiah). The album contained political-social songs: "Waiting for The Messiah" dealt with the crash of the Israeli Stock Market, Lo Otzer BeAdom (Doesn't Stop For Red Lights) was written about the 1982 Lebanon War. It also contained personal songs and love songs. This album was produced by Hanoch and Moshe Levi, who since then became his musical partner. Hanoch planned a tour in small halls, but eventually, he decided to risk putting on four stadium shows. In 1988, Hanoch created another album, "Rak Ben-Adam" (Only Human), which wasn't very successful because it was partially made in England.

In 1991, Hanoch recorded his album BaGilgul Haze which was a big success. One of the songs, Kacha VeKacha, was written as a joke but was very successful.

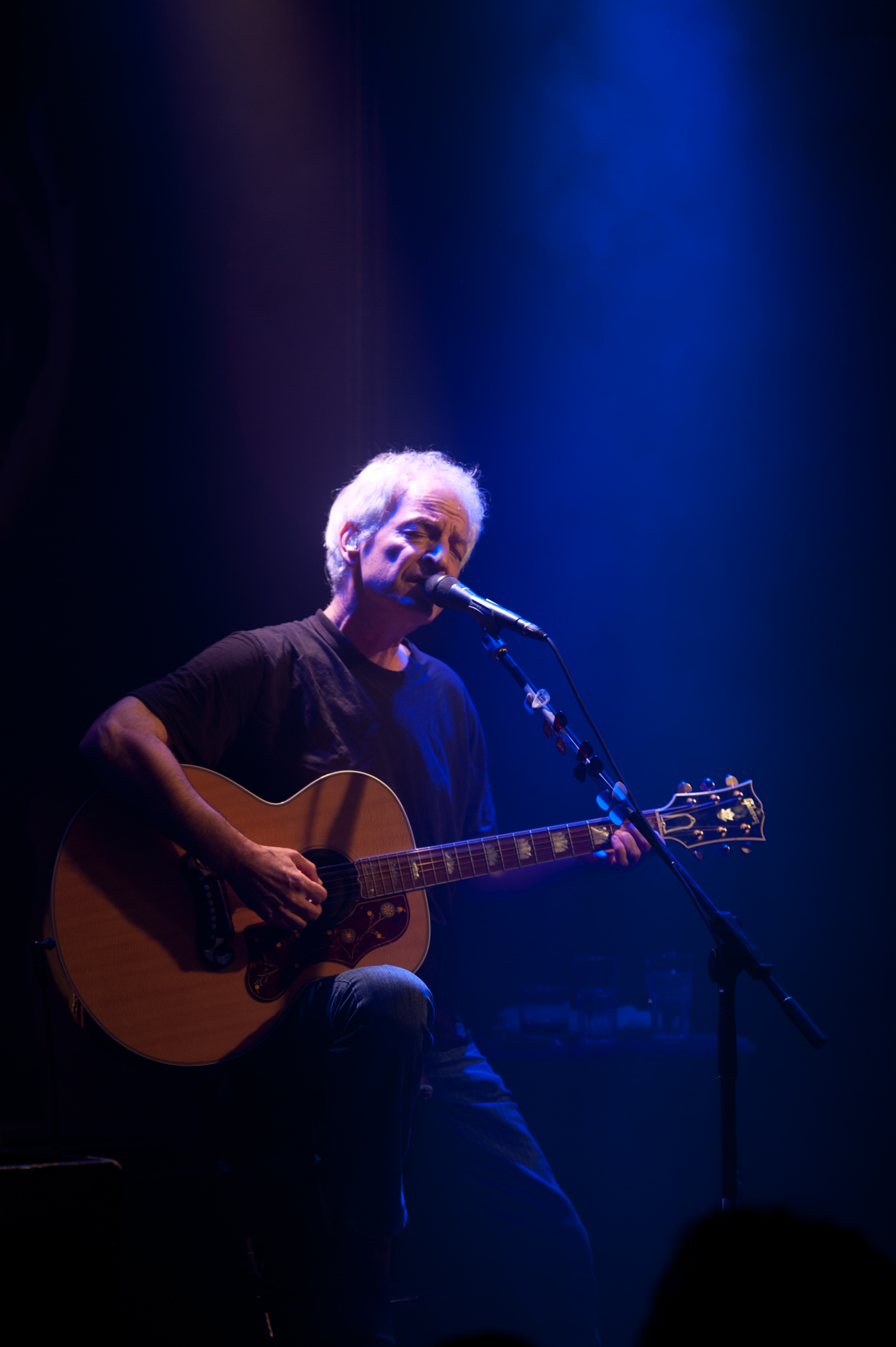
Shalom Hanoch at Zappa Tel Aviv

In 1992, Hanoch released a collection of songs, partially from a live show, called Lo Yechol Lishon Achshav (Can't Sleep Now). In 1994 he recorded A-Li-Mut (Violence); in 1997 he released Erev Erev (Evening Evening), which also included a few translated songs from his English album. In the same year, he composed Shalom Haver (Goodbye Friend), in the memory of Prime Minister Yitzhak Rabin, for Einstein's album LeAn Parhu HaParparim. This was the first cooperation between Einstein and Hanoch after 17 years. The collaboration resulted in a joint album by Einstein and him – Muskat (1999).

In 2001, an independent label, "C90", produced a bootleg from Hanoch's White Wedding tour. The album, distributed in 20 numbered copies only under the name "Lavan Shel Hatuna", featured a recording of a concert that took place in "Hadar" theatre in Givataym in January 1982. In 2002, 25 years after the release of Adam Betoch Azmo, the album was reissued with a bonus song recorded in 2000 with David Broza. In 2003, Hanoch recorded Or Israeli with the rock band Monica Sex. Among the album's songs are Ahavat Neuray, Hayom, and Rosh Hamemshala. The album's theme song stood out and gained the most recognition. In 2004, the Yetzia tour was released as a live album. At the end of that year, a five-disk collection was released, summarising Shalom's career up to that point. In the summer of 2005 Hanoch joined Shlomo Artzi, and they went on a tour called Hitchabrut, which was very successful and was released as a double album and a DVD. Hanoch and Artzi wrote the song Ani RoE Otach, especially for the tour.

Ever since 2005, Hanoch has been regularly performing at the Barby Club in Tel Aviv with a show called "Hayot Layla" (Night Animals), a title given to it because of the late hours of the night in which the show takes place. The show was documented and released on DVD in 2009.

In 2008, Hanoch guest starred as himself on the comedy show "Red Band" that deals with the Israeli music industry.

In 2009 Hanoch released the album "Shalom Hanoch", with music production done by Moshe Levi and Eyal Katzav. The singles that preceded the album were Ptuchim Leahava, the protest song Elohim and Omeret Li La'Ad.

In September 2009, Hanoch's song Mehakim LaMashiach won the title "Best Song Of All Time" on "Yedioth Ahronot"'s Rosh Hashana holiday paper, as rated by senior music industry personas.

In 2010, Shalom Hanoch launched a new concert named "Arba Tachanot" (Four Stations), where he took a tour through milestones achieved throughout his career. The first milestone was dedicated to the albums "Shablul", "Plastelina" and "Shalom"; The second one to "Adam Betoch Atzmo" and "Sof Onat Hatapuzim"; the Third focused on "Hatuna Levana" and "Al Pney HaAdmaa" and the fourth to "mechakim LaMashiach" and "Rak Ben Adam". These concerts were custom to feature surprise guests such as Ehud Banay, Berry Sakharof, Rita, Aviv Geffen, Tom & Orit Petrober (Hayehudim), Ninet Tayeb, Romi Hanoch, Assaf Amdursky, Dana Berger, Yizhar Ashdot and Keren Peles. The concerts were documented on a live concert album of 4 CDs and on DVD.

== Discography ==
=== Albums ===
- 1970 – Plastelina, פלסטלינה [Plasticine] (with Arik Einstein)
- 1970 – Shablool, שבלול [ Snail ] (with Arik Einstein)
- 1971 – Shalom
- 1977 – Adam Betoch Azmo, אדם בתוך עצמו [A Man Within Himself]
- 1981 – Hatuna Levana, חתונה לבנה [White Wedding]
- 1983 – Al Pnei HaAdama, על פני האדמה [On the Ground's Surface]
- 1985 – Mehakim LeMashiach, מחכים למשיח [Waiting for the Messiah]
- 1988 – Rak Ben Adam, רק בן אדם [Only Human]
- 1991 – BaGilgul Haze, בגלגול הזה [In this [This Time Around]]
- 1992 – Lo Yachol Lishon Achshav, לא יכול לישון עכשיו [Can't Sleep Now]
- 1994 – Alimut, א-לי-מות [Violence]
- 1997 – Erev Erev, ערב ערב [Evening Evening]
- 1999 – Muskat, מוסקט [Muscat] (with Arik Einstein)
- 2002 – Adam Betoch Azmo (25th Anniversary edition)
- 2003 – Or Israeli, אור ישראלי [Israeli Light] (with Monica Sex)
- 2004 – Shablul (Remastered and expanded edition)
- 2009 – "Shalom Hanoch"

==== with HaShlosharim ====
- 1969 – HaShlosharim, השלושרים
- 1991 – HaShlosharim (1st CD release)
- 2002 - HaShlosharim (Second CD release)

==== with Tamouz ====
- 1976 – Sof Onat HaTapuzim, סוף עונת התפוזים [End of the Orange Season]
- 1989 – Sof Onat HaTapuzim (1st CD release)
- 2006 – Sof Onat HaTapuzim (Remastered and expanded edition)

=== Live albums ===
- 1978 – Behofa'a Chaya, בהופעה חיה [Live]
- 1980 – Arik Einstein VeShalom Hanoch Behofa'a, אריק איינשטיין ושלום חנוך בהופעה [Einstein and Hanoch Live]
- 1989 – Shalom Hanoch BeHofa'a – Roman Amiti, שלום חנוך בהופעה – רומן אמיתי [Shalom Hanoch Live – Real Romance]
- 2003 – Yetzia, יציאה [Exit]
- 2005 – Shlomo Artzi VeShalom Hanoch BeKeisaria, שלמה ארצי ושלום חנוך בקיסריה [ Shlomo Artzi and Shalom Hanoch in Caesarea ]
- 2012 – Yetzia 2, יציאה 2 [Exit II]

=== Compilations ===
- 1995 – MiShirei Shalom Hanoch BaShanim 1969–1976
- 2004 – Hakufsa, הקופסא [The Box]
- 2006 – HaMeitav, המיטב [The Best of]
