= Waiting for the Messiah (song) =

"Mehakim LeMashiach"

Single by Shalom Hanoch

from the album Waiting for the Messiah
- Language: Hebrew
- English title: Waiting for the Messiah
- Released: February 1985
- Genre: Israeli rock
- Length: 5:47 (album version); 4:50 (single version)
- Label: CBS Israel Records
- Songwriter: Shalom Hanoch
- Producer: Moshe Levi

Waiting for the Messiah (Hebrew: מחכים לְמָשיח, romanized: Mehakim LeMashiach) is an Israeli protest song written and recorded by Israeli singer-songwriter Shalom Hanoch, later released as the lead single of Hanoch's fifth studio album Waiting for the Messiah, in February 1985 on CBS Israel Records.

Inspired by the 1983 Israel bank stock crisis, Hanoch wrote the song as a ballad featuring fictional characters, all of whom work for a company called "Artieli Consulting Ltd", and all of whom are waiting for Moshiach, a stockbroker named after and meant to represent the Messiah.

Waiting for the Messiah is one of Hanoch's most acclaimed songs, with it being ranked as the greatest Israeli song of all time by Yedioth Ahronoth in 2010, as well as being frequently ranked in other rankings of the greatest Israeli songs of all time.

== Background and lyrics ==
Waiting for the Messiah was inspired by two different events: the first was the 1983 Israel bank stock crisis, and the second was a dispute Hanoch had with his landlord. The dispute arose when Hanoch and his then-girlfriend Dafna Armoni moved into an apartment in Kikar Hamedina in Tel Aviv in 1984. The couple noticed that the apartment did not suit their needs, and thus, Hanoch contacted the landlord of the apartment to cancel the lease, but the landlord declined to do so. This, alongside the stock crisis, inspired Hanoch to write the song. In an interview with Israeli Army Radio in July 2025, Hanoch stated that he wrote the song in about a day and did not bother to make any changes to the lyrics or melody. Originally, the song was supposed to have a low tempo, but a misunderstanding between studio engineers and one of the album's producers, Moshe Levi, led to the song being recorded with a higher tempo. In a contemporary interview with music critic Yossi Hersonski on Maariv, Hanoch said that another inspiration was his anger at the lack of activism by Israelis to do anything about the difficult sociopolitical state that Israel was in at the time. The guitars for the song were done via sampling, a relatively new technique in Israeli music at the time, making it one of the first Israeli songs to make use of samples.

=== Lyrics ===
Waiting for the Messiah is a ballad featuring several fictional characters working for a company called "Artieli Consulting Ltd." All of the characters are at a board meeting waiting for Moshiach, a stockbroker named after and meant to represent the Messiah. During the meeting, a police officer tells them that an accident has happened. One of the characters, Artieli Jr, asks the police officer what the accident is, and he informs him that "the stock market has crashed", referencing the 1983 Israel bank stock crisis. In the same verse, the officer tells the cast that people are jumping off of roofs. This includes Moshiach, who is confirmed to have killed himself by the same officer. The final verse features a line directed at the then Finance Minister of Israel, Yoram Aridor. The line is: "Bitter December, the newspaper headlines read/And the Finance Minister gave an interview that made everyone red./'The public is dumb and that's why the public pays!'/What was easy to get, will also become easy to set ablaze.". This line, though not actually said by Aridor, has nonetheless remained synonymous with his public image and legacy.

One of the characters, Yardena, was inspired by Yarden Levinson, who was a model at the time but today lives in New Jersey.

== Reception and legacy ==
Waiting for the Messiah was released in February 1985 and received critical acclaim. In a 2015 retrospective on the song, Boaz Cohen, writing for Maariv, wrote that the song's lyrics and message remain relevant, even after 30 years since its release. The song was ranked as the greatest Israeli song of all time by Yedioth Ahronoth in 2010. It has also been frequently ranked in other rankings of the greatest Israeli songs of all time.

The line: "The public is dumb, and that's why the public pays!" has become a phrase in Israeli political journalism since the song's release.
