= Erica Brown =

American writer and educator

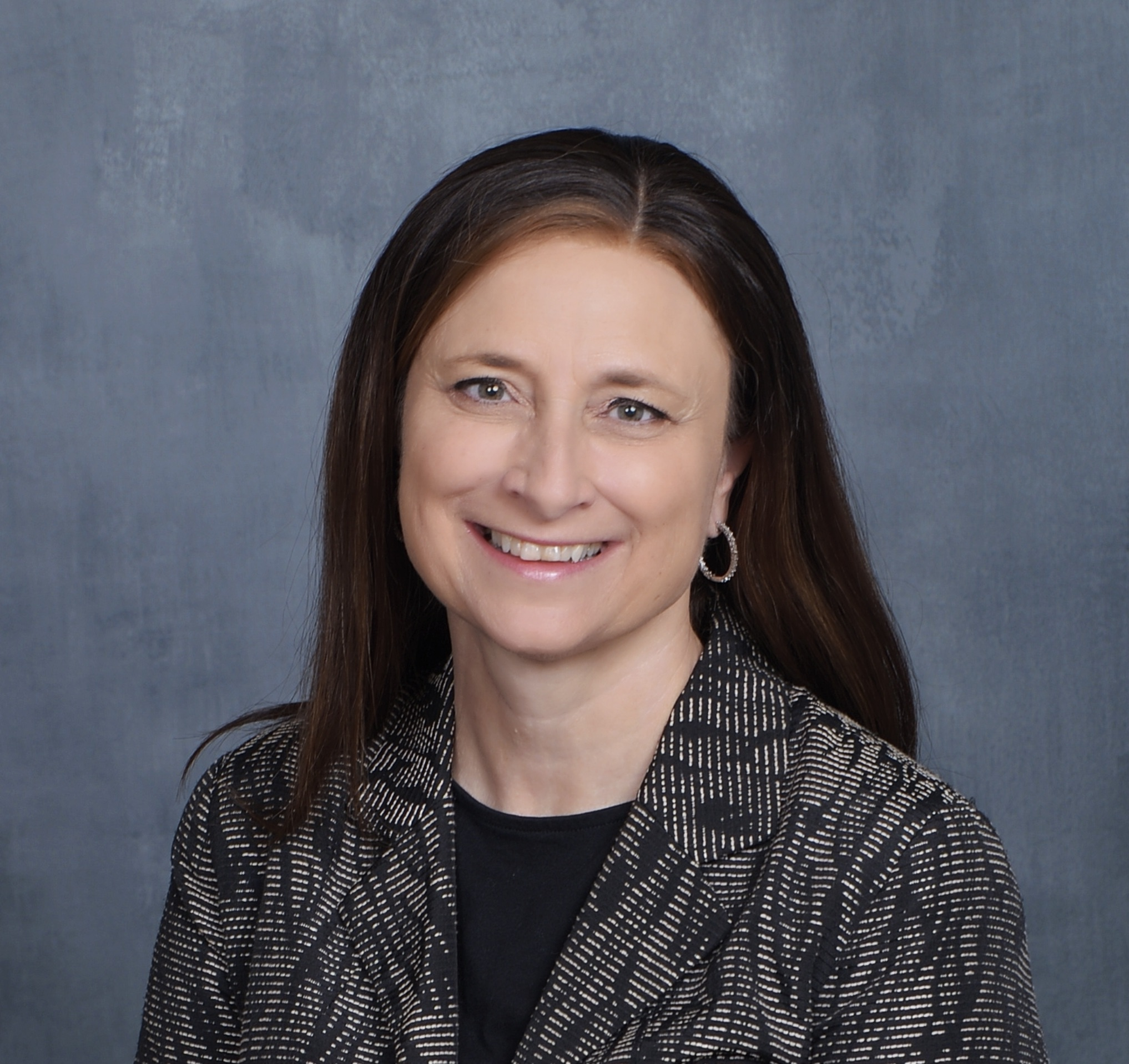
Erica Brown

Dr. Erica Brown (born 1966) is vice provost for values and leadership at Yeshiva University and is the founding director of its Rabbi Lord Jonathan Sacks-Herenstein Center for Values and Leadership. She is a faculty member of Yeshiva University’s Azrieli School of Jewish Education and Administration. Her "Weekly Jewish Wisdom" column has appeared in The Washington Post.

Brown previously served as the founding director of the Mayberg Center for Jewish Education and Leadership and an associate professor of curriculum and pedagogy at the George Washington University. She is a former a scholar-in-residence for the Jewish Federation of Greater Washington, and a consultant to other Jewish organizations. She is the author of fifteen books on leadership, the Hebrew Bible and spirituality. She hosted a podcast, Take Your Soul to Work. She has written extensively on topics of Jewish spirituality and philosophy the place of religion in modernity, and on the human condition.

== Biography ==
Brown attended the Frisch School in Paramus, New Jersey. She graduated Stern College of Yeshiva University and has master's degrees from Harvard and University of London. She received her doctorate in Jewish history from Baltimore Hebrew College. Brown is a former Jerusalem Fellow.

== Books ==
- Samson and the Enigma of Strength (Oxford University Press, 2027)
- The Heart of Courage in Theory and Practice (Palgrave Macmillan, 2027) co-edited with Dr. Shira Weiss
- Faith-Honoring: Making the Case for Faith-Inclusive Pedagogy (Academic Studies Press, 2024), co-authored with Jill Lindsey, Doug Stump, Rehenuma Asmi, and Amaara DeCuir
- The Torah of Leadership: Essays on the Weekly Parsha, Maggid Books, a Division of Koren Publishers Jerusalem, 2024
- Morning Has Broken: Faith After October 7th, Toby Press, a Division of Koren Publishers Jerusalem, 2024
- An Ode to Joy: Judaism and Happiness in the Thought of Rabbi Lord Jonathan Sacks and Beyond, Palgrave Macmillan, 2023, with Dr. Shira Weiss.
- Ecclesiastes and the Search for Meaning, Maggid Books, a Division of Koren Publishers Jerusalem, 2023
- The Book of Esther: Power, Fate and Fragility in Exile, Maggid Books, a Division of Koren Publishers Jerusalem, 2020
- The Book of Jonah: The Reluctant Prophet, Maggid Books, a Division of Koren Publishers Jerusalem, 2017
- Take Your Soul to Work: Daily Meditations on Every Day Leadership, Simon and Schuster, 2015,
- Inspired Jewish Leadership: Practical Approaches to Building Strong Communities, Jewish Light Publishing, trans. by Jang-Heum Ok. Seoul, Korea: Dong Yeon Press, 2016
- Leadership in the Wilderness: Authority & Anarchy in the Book of Numbers, Maggid Books, a Division of Koren Publishers Jerusalem, 2013
- In the Narrow Places: Daily Inspiration for the Three Weeks, Maggid Books, a Division of Koren Publishers Jerusalem, 2011
- Confronting Scandal: How Jews Can Respond When Jews Do Bad Things, Jewish Lights Publishing, 2010
- Spiritual Boredom: Rediscovering the Wonder of Judaism, Jewish Lights Publishing, 2009
- The Case for Jewish Peoplehood: Can We Be One?, by Erica Brown, Misha Galperin, and Joseph Telushkin, 2009
- Inspired Jewish Leadership: Practical Approaches to Building Strong Communities, Jewish Lights Publishing, 2008
- Seder Talk: The Conversational Haggada, Maggid Books and OU Press, 2015.
