= Ariel Zilber =

Israeli singer-songwriter and composer (born 1943)

Ariel Zilber אריאל זילבר
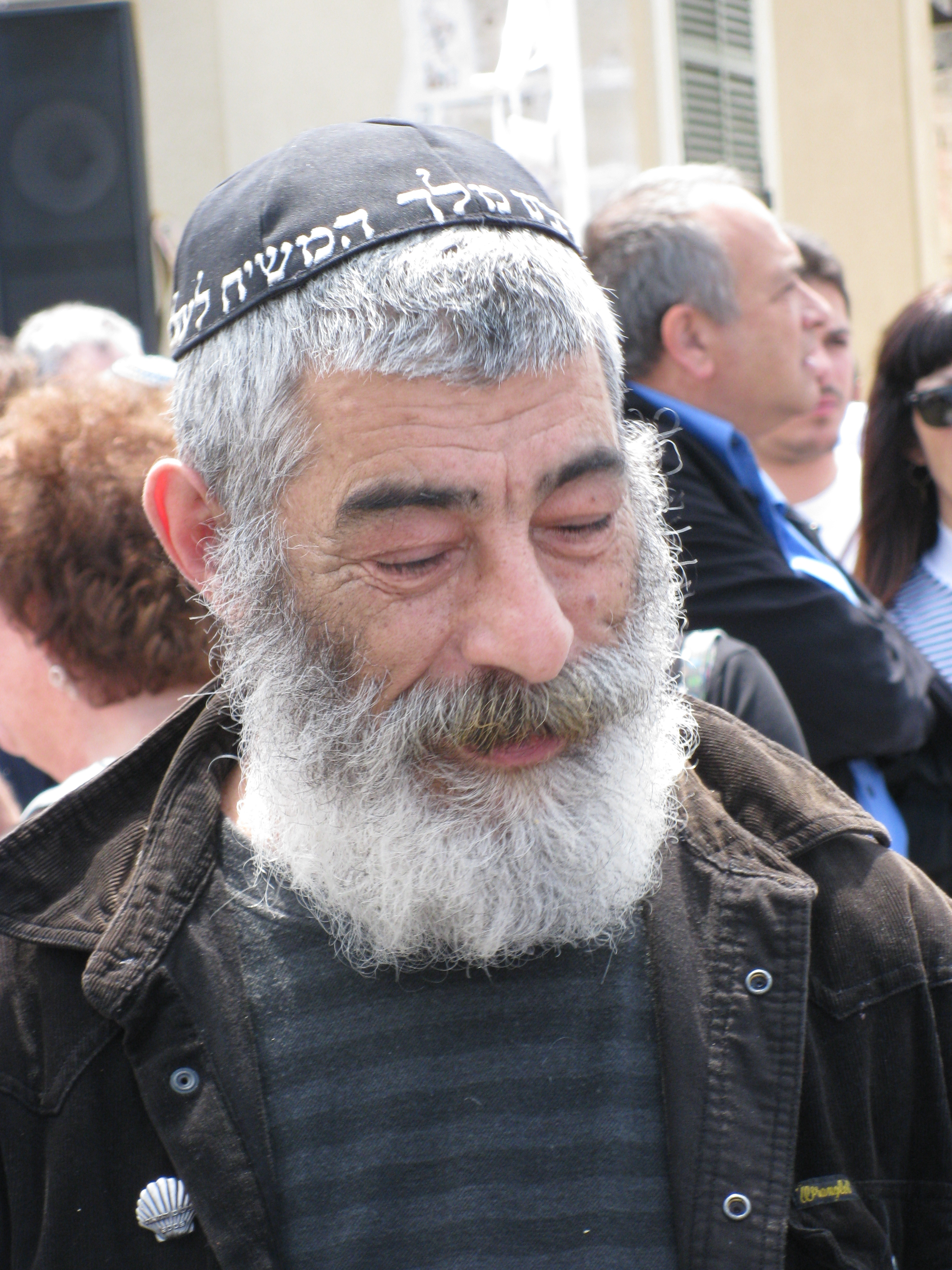

Background information
- Born: Ariel Zilber; September 23, 1943 (age 82); Tel Aviv, British Mandate of Palestine (now Israel)
- Genres: World; rock; folk
- Occupations: Singer-songwriter; composer; musician
- Instruments: Vocals; piano; trumpet
- Years active: 1967–present
- Label: The Eight Note
- Website: arielzilber.com

Ariel Zilber (Hebrew: אריאל זילבר; born September 23, 1943) is an Israeli singer-songwriter and composer.

== Biography ==
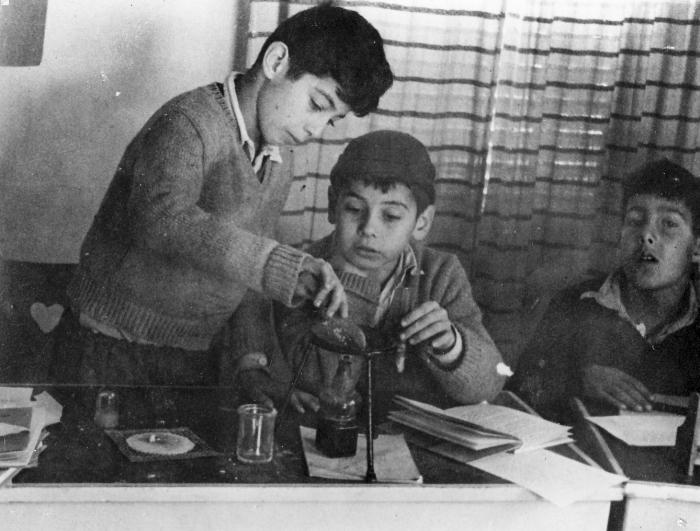
Ariel Zilber (left) at kibbutz Gan Shmuel, 1953

Ariel Zilber was born in Tel Aviv. His mother, Bracha Zefira, was a popular singer of Yemenite Jewish origin and his father, Ben Ami Zilber, played the violin in the Israeli Philharmonic Orchestra. As both were busy with their international careers, they placed their son in a boarding school on kibbutz Gan Shmuel, where he lived from age four to fifteen. After losing part of a foot while playing with explosives in his room, he was expelled from the school and returned to his parents in Tel Aviv, where he began studying the trumpet. He spent several years in England and France building up a career, but eventually returned to Tel Aviv.

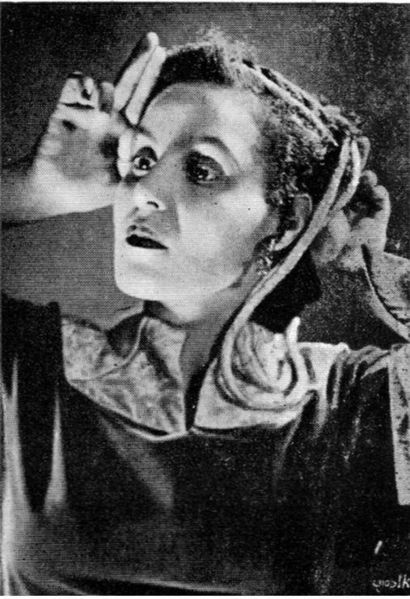
Bracha Zefira, mother of Ariel Zilber

Later in life, Zilber became a religious Jew and a follower of the Lubavitcher rebbe. He was a resident of Alei Sinai, but now lives with his wife on moshav Gitit. Following this change, he became well known for his extremist opinions. For example, in 2007, he participated in a campaign for the release of Yigal Amir, who assassinated Prime Minister of Israel Yitzhak Rabin.

== Music career ==
In the 1970s, he established the innovative rock band Tamuz, with Shalom Hanoch, and later headed the group Brosh. His songs "Rutzi, Shmulik Koreh Lach" ("Run, Shmulik Is Calling You"), "Ani Shochev Li Al Hagav" ("Lying on My Back"), "Ten Li Koach" ("Give Me Strength"), "Milliard Sinim" ("A Billion Chinese") and others were known for their amusing, somewhat bizarre lyrics.

In the 1980s, he launched a solo career. His music spans various genres, from rock, pop, hip-hop and Arab music to Ethiopian-inspired music. His album "Ha'atalef Vehatarnigol" ("The Bat and the Rooster") included four Hasidic melodies composed by Rabbi Yitzhak Ginsburgh. According to Zilber, the title song is taken from a Talmudic analogy in which a rooster crows excitedly as a new day dawns while the bat lives in darkness.

== Awards and recognition ==
In 2014, Zilber won an ACUM prize for his contribution to music. Initially, he was to be granted the lifetime achievement award, but due to his political views, the prize was downgraded to an award for his musical accomplishments. In 2016, Zilber was honored with the lifetime achievement award of the Israeli Union of Performing Artists.

== Discography ==
=== Albums ===
- Rutzi Shmulik, 1976
- Ariel Zilber and the Brosh Band, 1978
- Ariel Zilber, 1982
- Ariel Zilber, CD, 1983
- Ba Da Di Dia, 1988
- Two weeks in a foreign city, 1991
- Smoke Screen, 1999
- Anabel, 2005
- Politically Correct, 2008
- The Bat and the Rooster (Ha'atalef Vehatarnigol), 2013
- Someone (Mishehu), 2016

== See also ==
- Music of Israel
