= Coren =

Coren is a variant of the Roman masculine and female given name Corina meaning "spear".

It was the surname of the following people:

- Alan Coren (1938–2007), English journalist and satirist
- Anna Coren (born 1975), Australian journalist and television presenter
- Finn Coren (born 1961), Norwegian musician
- Giles Coren (born 1969), English journalist
- Michael Coren (born 1959), Canadian columnist and radio personality
- Richard Coren, American bridge player
- Stanley Coren (born 1942), U.S. psychologist and student of dog behavior
- Victoria Coren Mitchell (born 1972), English journalist and poker player
- Yitzhak Coren (1911–1994), Israeli politician and Yiddish writer

== See also ==
- Koren
