= Franz Kraus =

Israeli graphic designer (1905–1998)

- Kraus's 1936 "Visit Palestine" poster
- Born: May 13, 1905; Sankt Pölten, Austria–Hungary
- Died: April 7, 1998 (aged 92); Tel Aviv, Israel
- Known for: graphic design

Franz Kraus (Hebrew: פרנץ קראוס; also known as Franz Krausz; 13 May 1905, Sankt Pölten, Austria – 7 April 1998, Tel Aviv, Israel) was an Israeli graphic designer.

== Biography ==
Between 1910 and 1923, Kraus grew up in Graz, Austria, and claimed that his favorite place was the art studio of brother Emil Kraus. (Emil went on to study at the Akademie der bildenden Künste in Vienna and at Alexander Archipenko's own art school in Berlin, and became a prominent member of the Sezession Graz. Emil's twin brother immigrated to the United States in 1939. Their other brother, Otto, died in one of the Nazi concentration camps in the 1940s, and Emil under unknown circumstances in Paris.) Franz's first employment, arranged by his father, was as a window decorator of the bookstore of the Löwit-Verlag, a major publisher in Vienna. He had settled in Vienna in 1923 at age 18, where he resided for three years. As a Jew, his interest in Zionist issues began to develop and was encouraged by his reading the speeches of Chaim Weizmann and Ze'ev (Vladimir) Jabotinsky.

Kraus lived in Berlin 1926–33, where he eventually assumed the position of the sole graphic designer of the Friedrich Ernst Hübsch-Verlag (publisher). The job fulfilled his early desire to become an artist; he had envied brother Emil's talent. As a night student, he studied in the Reimann Schule in Berlin, the city where he met his wife-to-be Anni. Due to the frightening public antisemitic incidences there, he and Anni decided to immigrate to Palestine. They spent a year, 1933–34, in Barcelona (arriving there from Paris) where Franz designed Hollywood film posters. Anni was a photographer for a German journalist whose wife was Jewish, a circumstance which possibly supported the association. Because there was no rabbi or an active synagogue in Barcelona, they could not be married as Austrian citizens and were rather wed in a civil ceremony at the German embassy. Fortunately, through a generous uncle of Anni, they were able to buy visas to Palestine, sailing from Marseille to the port of Jaffa, arriving October 1934.

The Krauses settled in Tel Aviv. Through receptive manufacturers, Franz was able to acquire clients for advertising; he designed posters for companies such as Dubek cigarettes, for which he worked for 45 years. Another on-going client was Elite, a candy manufacturer (today owned by Straus). Prior to Kraus, who dealt with every aspect of graphic design, business people in pre-1948 Palestine and early Israel knew little about advertising methods. Even though Kraus employed photography later in his career, his most dynamic and colorful work was realized through his hand-painted artwork, frequently in gouache, sometimes calling on photographic studies shot by his wife. His best-known image is the "Visit Palestine" poster of 1936. He was prolific but made very little money from frugal clients and, according to Kraus himself, was unable to work gratis. He was one of Israel's most-accomplished graphic designers.

== Exhibitions ==
- One-person venue, Tel Aviv Museum of Art, Tel Aviv, Israel, 1981
- "Franz Krausz—Pionier der Werbegrafik in Israel," Neue Galerie Graz am Landesmuseum, Austria, 24 February–28 March 2005
- "Franz Krausz—Blumen und Muschein Israels," Jüdischen Kulturzentrums, Graz, Austria, 1–28 March 2005
- "Die Neuen Hebräer—100 Jahre Kunst in Israel", Martin-Gropius-Bau, Berlin, Germany, 20 May–5 September 2005

== Collection of works ==
- Tel Aviv Museum of Art, Tel Aviv, Israel
