= Eliyahu Koren =

German–Israeli typographer (1907–2001)

- אליהו קורן
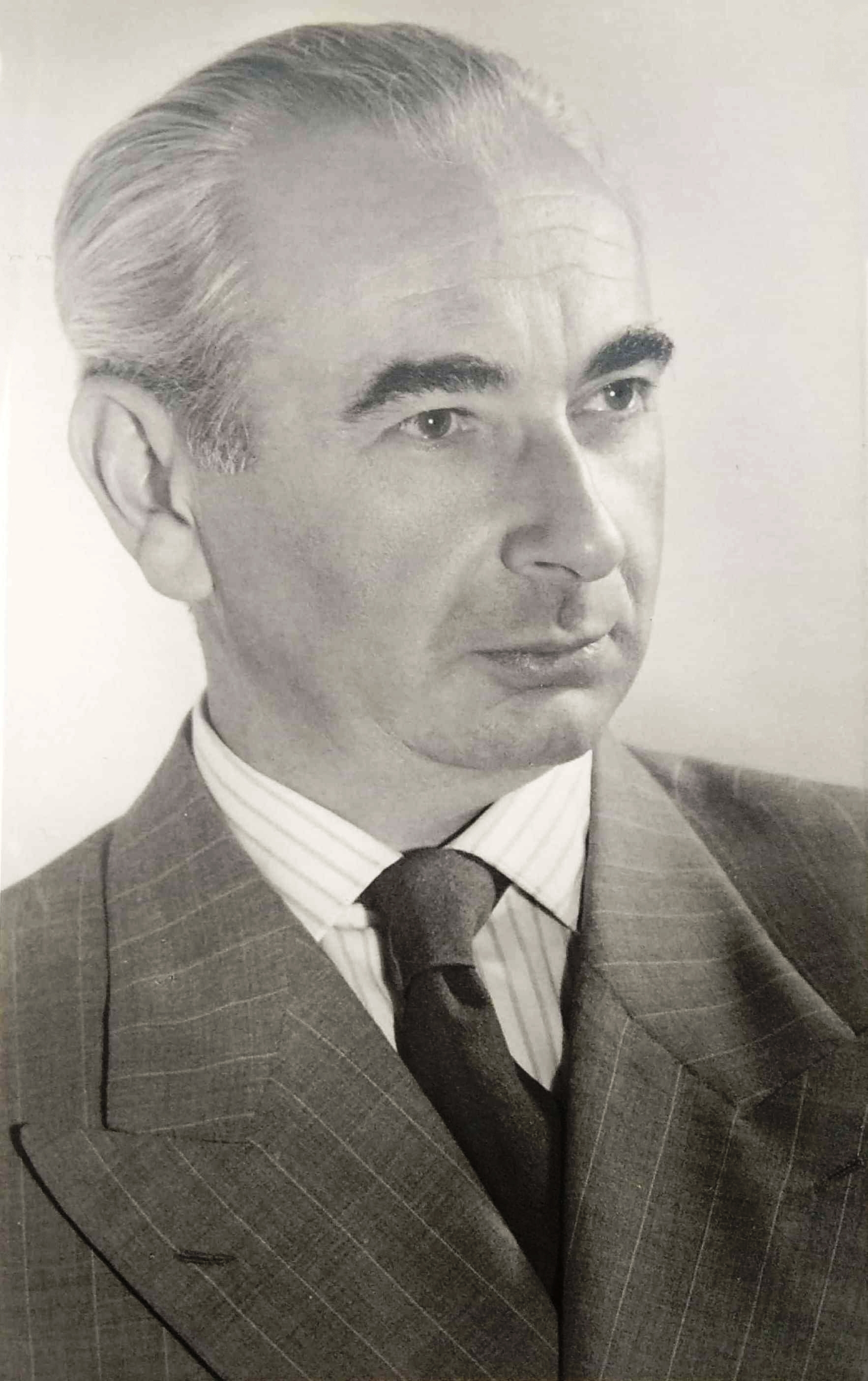
- Born: 23 July 1907; Nuremberg, Kingdom of Bavaria, German Empire
- Died: 17 February 2001 (aged 93); Jerusalem
- Other name: Eliyahu Korngold
- Occupations: Graphic designer and typographer
- Spouse: Channa Neuwirth
- Website: Koren Publishers Jerusalem website

Eliyahu Koren (Hebrew: אליהו קורן; 23 July 1907 – 17 February 2001) was a German-born Israeli graphic designer and typographer. After studying in Nuremberg, he immigrated to Mandatory Palestine in 1933. He served as head of the graphics department of Keren Kayemet, the Jewish National Fund, from 1936 to 1957. He founded Koren Publishers Jerusalem in 1961, which published the Koren Bible in 1962. He published the Koren Siddur in 1981, and various Jewish religious texts until his death.

== Biography ==
Eliyahu Korngold (later Koren) was born in Nuremberg, Kingdom of Bavaria, then part of the German Empire. He showed a rare artistic talent from an early age. After studying at the Gymnasium, Korngold attended the Kunstschule der Stadt Nürnberg, the city's School of Graphic and Applied Art, completing a six-year course of graphic art, applied art, and stained glass in three years.

In 1933, when he was an assistant to a professor at the Kunstschule and a youth leader in the Ezra religious youth movement, Korngold read that Bavarian Jews were being required to carry special secret police travel permits to travel abroad. "I saw by this verdict divestiture of the freedom of the Jewish individual, and decided to leave Germany at the earliest possible hour," he would later recall. Korngold and a group of friends left Bavaria on April 1, 1933, and arrived in Haifa, Mandatory Palestine on May 15 of that year.

== Graphic design career ==
For six months, Korngold worked for one of the few graphic designers in Palestine at the time, Rudi Deutsch (Dayan), in Tel Aviv. Next he prepared illustrations for various books and exhibitions. From 1936 to 1957, Korngold headed the graphics department of Keren Kayemet, the Jewish National Fund, where he was responsible for graphics, publications, stamps, and the organization's Golden Book. During that time, he also designed the present seal of the city of Jerusalem.

In the early 1940s, Judah Magnes, first president of the Hebrew University of Jerusalem (1935–1948), asked Koren if he could develop a new font for a planned edition of the Hebrew Bible, while the Italian–Jewish rabbi and biblical scholar Umberto Cassuto was busy determining the best text version for this new edition. Eventually, both Magnes and Cassuto died, and the Hebrew University printing press ultimately reprinted a 19th-century edition with corrections. Koren, however, continued the project independently. In his small Jerusalem-based publishing house, Koren Publishers Jerusalem, he developed a Hebrew font based on medieval Sephardic letter forms, which he had specifically modernized.

== The Koren Bible ==
By the mid-late 1950s, Korngold had begun to work on what would become his most significant work, the Koren Bible. Korngold was committed to publishing a Hebrew Bible designed, edited, printed, and bound entirely by Jews—something that had not been accomplished in nearly 500 years. The first printed Hebrew Bibles from Italy (1488) were printed during the Italian Renaissance by the Italkim (Italian–Jewish communities), but after Daniel Bomberg's 1517 Venice printing all editions up to the 20th century had non-Jewish publishers or printers, and errors had found their way into the text.

Korngold had been approached by Judah L. Magnes, then president of the Hebrew University of Jerusalem, about creating a new font for a new edition of the Hebrew Bible in the 1940s. Korngold set to work on a font and won a competition for the project, but following years of work on the Hebrew University's Bible Committee, which Korngold chaired, the project moved in a direction that he and many biblical scholars found unacceptable. Rather than create a wholly new edition of the Hebrew Bible, in 1953 the Hebrew University published a photographic offset of Christian David Ginsburg's British and Foreign Bible Society edition to which hundreds of corrections had been made by Umberto Cassuto on the basis of the Aleppo Codex and other very old manuscripts, producing a text of unprecedented accuracy. Eventually, Korngold resigned from the committee.

He then set himself to the task of producing a new edition of the Hebrew Bible on his own. In 1957, Koren established an independent studio and in 1961 he founded his own publishing house, Koren Publishers Jerusalem. In 1962, during Hanukkah, Koren Publishers Jerusalem published the Torah, the first portion of the Koren Bible. The final edition of the Hebrew Bible appeared nearly two years later. During this time, Korngold changed his name to "Koren". He worked painstakingly on the project, correcting typesetting errors of previous editions, and creating a new font, Koren Bible Type to enable the text to be as accurate and legible as possible. The text, vocalization, and cantillation were based on an early 19th-century edition of the Hebrew Bible from the German–Jewish grammarian and masoretic scholar Wolf Heidenheim. Avraham Meir Habermann, Daniel Goldschmidt, and Meir Medan proofread and edited the text.

The Koren Bible was immediately recognized as the new standard edition of the Hebrew Bible in Israel. In response to its publication, David Ben-Gurion declared, "Israel is redeemed from shame". The Chief Rabbinate of Israel accepted the edition for reading the haftarah (prophetic portions) in synagogues when the handwritten parchment scroll is not used. The Koren Bible became the Hebrew Bible on which the President of Israel is sworn into office. The Israeli Ministry of Education and Israeli municipalities began distributing the Koren Bible as gifts to high school graduates, and the Israel Defense Forces (IDF) also began distributing it to newly inducted soldiers.

However, the quality of the text has been criticized by academics and scholars. For example, Moshe Goshen-Gottstein said: "Since he was aware of his lack in masoretic expertise, he sought the help of three scholars, all of who suffered from the same lack of masoretic expertise [...] while the publisher made persistent claims that this was the first edition set and printed in their old/new homeland, this was, in fact [...] hardly an edition like that of Dotan, but another rehash of the material prepared by Ben Hayim."

Later on, Koren Publishers Jerusalem published a bilingual Hebrew–English edition of the Koren Bible with a new translation performed by Harold Fisch, a British–Israeli literary scholar and Professor of English and Comparative literature at Bar-Ilan University. Fisch was responsible for the English translation of the Hebrew Bible for Koren's Jerusalem Bible (1964), based on Michael Friedländer's Jewish Family Bible, which is still in publication and on its third edition.

== Koren Siddur ==
Koren began work on a new Jewish prayerbook in the 1970s. Koren created the Koren Book Type for the project, and an innovative design for which the siddur would become famous. Rather than allow the text to run continuously across page turns, Koren maintained lines and paragraphs within individual pages. He set individual sentences line by line, according to their meaning. The result was the Koren Siddur, published in 1981, that facilitated uninterrupted prayer and elucidated the underlying meaning of the text. The siddur became one of the most widely used Jewish prayerbooks in Israel. In 2009, Koren Publishers Jerusalem introduced a bilingual Hebrew–English edition of the Koren Siddur, the Koren Sacks Siddur, with an introduction, translation, and commentary written by the Chief Rabbi of the United Kingdom, Rabbi Lord Jonathan Sacks.
