= Tamouz (band) =

Tamouz (Hebrew: תמוז) was an Israeli rock band which released the influential album "End of the Orange Season" (סוף עונת התפוזים) in 1975. The band did not attain much commercial success, but they are a reference point in Israeli Rock, with hits like: "Sof Onat Ha'Tapuzim" (End of the Orange Season) and "Ma She'Youter Amok Yoter Cachol" (The Deeper The Bluer). The album is considered by many listeners to be the best Israeli rock album of all time. Both principal songwriters and singers in the band, Shalom Hanoch and Ariel Zilber became very successful solo stars in Israel.

== Band members ==
- Shalom Hanoch - Vocals, Guitar
- Ariel Zilber - Vocals, Keyboards
- Yehuda Eder - Guitars
- Ethan Gedron - Bass
- Meir Israel - Drums
