= Elad Koren =

Israeli footballer

Elad Koren אלעד קורן
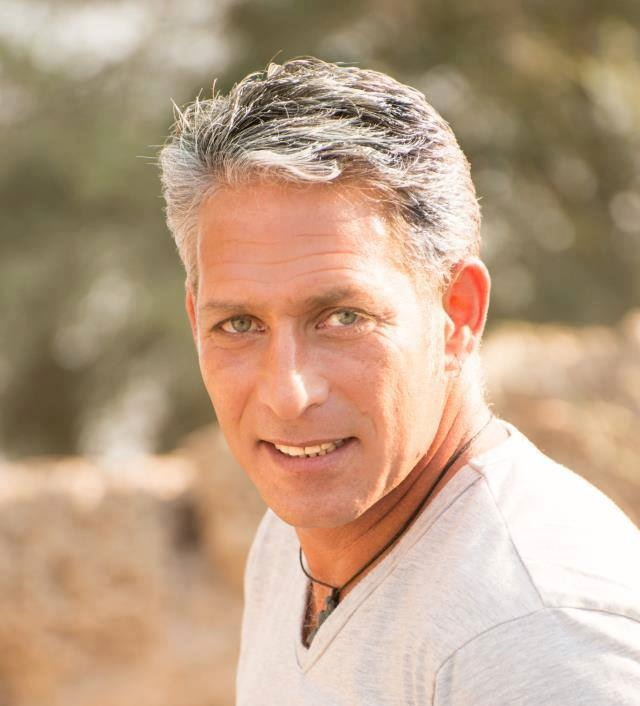

Personal information
- Full name: Elad Koren
- Date of birth: July 3, 1968 (age 58)
- Place of birth: Netanya, Israel
- Position: Defender

Youth career
- Maccabi Netanya

Senior career*
Years	Team	Apps	(Gls)
1985–1992	Maccabi Netanya	125	(2)
1992–1993	Maccabi Haifa (loan)	21	(1)
1993–1994	Maccabi Ironi Ashdod (loan)	28	
1994–1998	Maccabi Herzliya	120	
- * Club domestic league appearances and goals

Elad Koren (Hebrew: אלעד קורן) is a former Israeli footballer who played in Maccabi Netanya, Maccabi Haifa, Maccabi Ironi Ashdod and Maccabi Herzliya.

In 1985, he made his debut in the senior side of Maccabi Netanya while only 16 years old.

After retiring from his professional career as a football player, Elad turned to the high-tech industry and climbed up the corporate ladder. He is now a vice president leading complex projects in the telecommunication industry.

Elad has also continued to refine his knowledge and skills in photography, becoming an experienced nature and wildlife photographer. He seeks to capture the emotional dimension of each scene, bringing a sense of life and immediacy to his images. For Elad, nature and wildlife photography is about being fully present in the moment and conveying that experience in a manner that is both truthful and engaging. He approaches the camera much as a painter approaches a brush, using it to reveal the unique character and beauty of his subjects.

Elad photographs wildlife, landscapes, and people in their natural habitats by using composition, natural light and precision.

His photos are presented in galleries around the world (Paris, Barcelona, Milan, Israel and more). His work is being sold to private collectors, interior designers and can be seen decorating high-class restaurants, law offices, and private homes.

== Honours ==
- Israel State Cup
  - Winner (1) 1992–93
- Championships
  - Runner-up (1): 1987–88
- Toto Cup
  - Runner-up (2): 1986–87, 1988–89
