= Koren Type =

Koren Type refers to two Hebrew fonts, Koren Bible Type and Hebrew Book Type created by Israeli typographer and graphic designer Eliyahu Koren. Koren created Koren Bible Type for the specific purpose of printing The Koren Bible, published by Koren Publishers Jerusalem in 1962. He created Koren Book Type for The Koren Siddur (Prayerbook), which the publishing house produced in 1981.

== Koren Bible Type ==
Judah L. Magnes, President of The Hebrew University of Jerusalem asked Eliyahu Koren, then Korngold, to create a new font for an entirely new edition of the Hebrew Bible that he sought to publish under the University's auspices during World War II. The Bible was to be the first Bible designed, edited, printed, and bound by Jews in nearly 500 years. A design competition was held, and Korngold's font won.

The preliminary version of the font that grew out of the competition was used in an edition of the Book of Jonah issued in 1946 by the publishing house of The Hebrew University (later Magnes Press). The font was not cast for this modest publication, but rather drawn by Korngold and reproduced photographically. The font was based on the Moshe Ben-Asher Codex of the Prophets manuscript, belonging to the Karaite community in Cairo, the earliest Medieval manuscript with a colophon, written in 895 CE in Tiberias.

Following the Hebrew University's decision to publish a different edition of the Bible in 1953, Korngold resigned from the University Bible Committee and took over the initiative of producing a new, fully Jewish Bible with a new font.

Korngold set out to design the most readable Hebrew font possible. He consulted Dr. Arie Feigenbaum, an ophthalmologist, who shared with him research conducted on the legibility of Latin book types. Korngold made clear distinctions between similar letters such as bet and kaf, gimel and nun, dalet and resh. He believed that each letter should be recognizable even if only its top third were visible. He also believed that designers should learn from the earliest printers and typographers, who based their fonts on fine handwriting.

The final design was the result of Korngold's study and re-study of Hebrew manuscripts and early printing types, and a sensitive approach to modernization that maintained serifs and shading (the contrast of thick and thin elements of the letter).

The Koren Bible Type was cast in 36-point size by Deberny & Peignot, the largest typefounding firm in France, over the course of two years. The type arrived in Israel in 1957, and a proof page was printed at Ahva Press. Korngold (now Koren), disappointed by the result, insisted that the foundry redo the type due to a loss of character in the letters' corners. The foundry agreed, after their microscopic examination proved that the Koren type was off by .03 millimeters.

=== Koren Book Type ===
Eliyahu Koren created Koren Book Type for use in the Koren Siddur, published in 1981.

Koren Type has been used in publications of Koren Publishers Jerusalem ever since, as well as in other important texts. The Jewish Braille Institute of America has used Koren Type for books published for the partially sighted.
