= Aron Dotan =

Israeli linguist (1928–2022)

- אהרן דותן
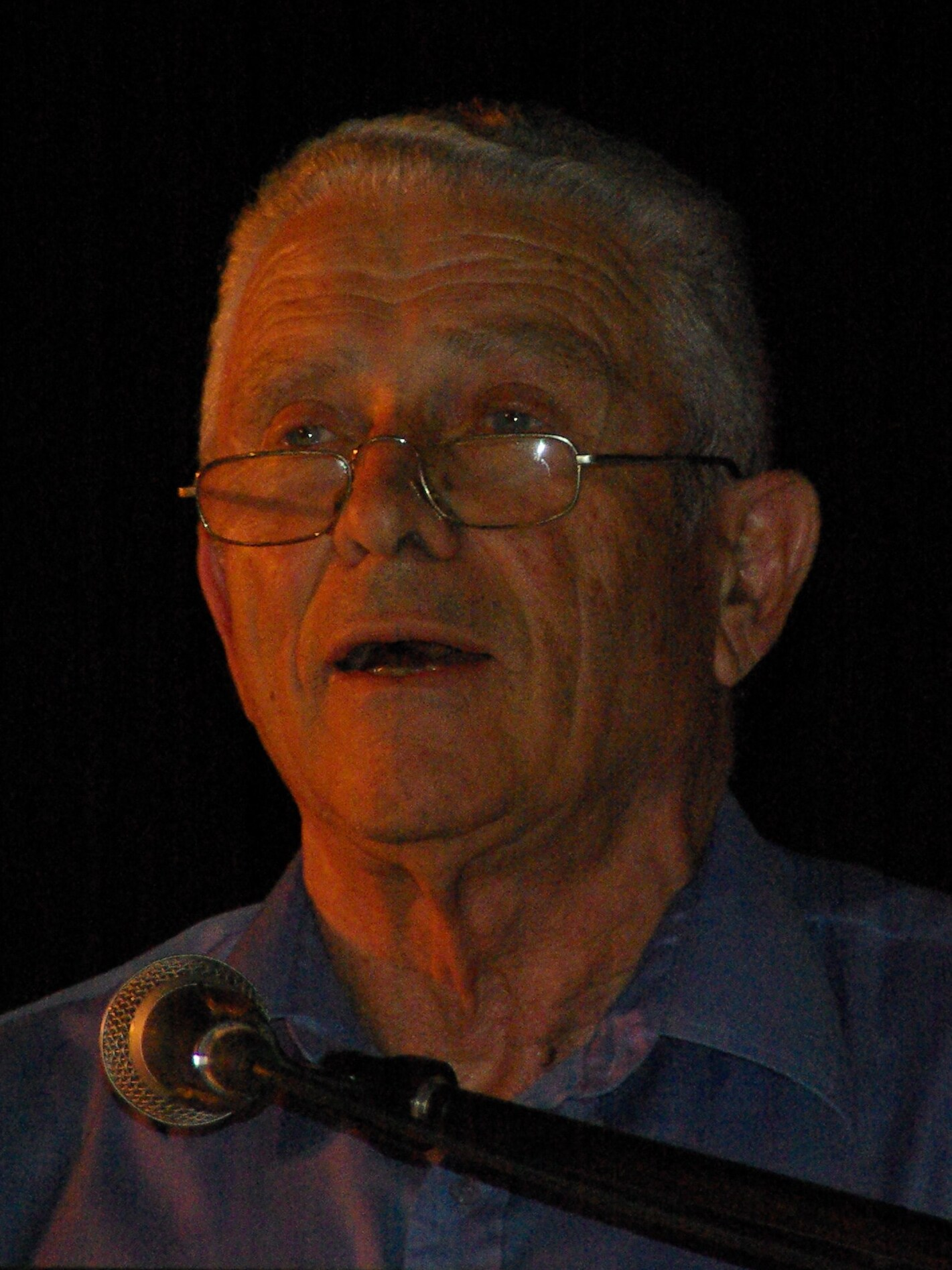
- Dotan in 2010
- Born: Aron Deutscher; January 12, 1928; Stuttgart, Germany
- Died: May 27, 2022 (aged 94); Tel Aviv, Israel
- Occupation: Linguist

Aron Dotan (Hebrew: אהרן דותן; January 12, 1928 – May 27, 2022) was an Israeli linguist and professor of Hebrew and Semitic languages at Tel Aviv University. An expert in the Masorah (system of transmission of the Biblical text), he served as the editor of the Biblia Hebraica Leningradensia, an edition of the Leningrad Codex which is used as the Bible of the Israel Defense Forces. Since then, he specialized in the accentuation of biblical Hebrew, and the early theory and practice of Hebrew linguistics. He was the founding director of the Cymbalista Jewish Heritage Center.

== Publications ==
- Biblia Hebraica Leningradensia: Prepared according to the Vocalization, Accents, and Masora of Aaron ben Moses ben Asher in the Leningrad Codex, Brill, 2000
- Or rishon behohkhmat halashon (À l'aube de la linguistique) — Le Livre de l'Élégance de la Langue des Hébreux, du Rav Saadia Gaon, en 2 volumes, World Union of Jewish Studies, Jérusalem, Rabbi David Moses and Amalia Rosen Foundation, 1997, 668 pages, ISBN 965-90148-2-1
- Niqqud rav Seʿadya : fact or fiction ?, Tarbiz 1997, vol. 66, n°2, pp. 247-257
- A New Fragment of Saadiah's" Sab'īn Lafẓah", The Jewish Quarterly Review, 1989
- From the Beginning of Medieval Hebrew-Arabic Lexicography, in Papers in the History of Linguistics, Aarsleff, Hans, L.G. Kelly and Hans-Josef Niederehe (eds.), 77 ff., 1987
- The Relative Chronology of Hebrew Vocalization and Accentuation, in Proceedings of the American Academy for Jewish Research, 1981
- Wilhelm Bacher's Place in the History of Hebrew Linguistics, Historiographia Linguistica 4:2, 135 ff., 1977
- Kutscher, Eduard Yechezkel, Hebrew and Aramaic Studies, ed. Z. Ben-Hayyim, A. Dotan, et G. Sarfatti: Jerusalem, The Magnes Press / The Hebrew University, 1977
- Ben Asher's Creed. A Study of the History of the Controversy, Missoula, Mont., 1977
- Masorah, in Encyclopaedia Judaica, Keter Publishing House, 1971
- Two Treatises on the Accentuation of the Old Testament W Wickes & A Dotan - 1970 - NY: KTAV Pub. House Inc.
- Diqduqei Hateamim of Aharon ben Mose ben Aser, Jérusalem, 1967
