= Bar Tzabary =

Israeli musical artist

Bar Tzabary בר צברי
- Born: June 10, 1992 (age 34)
- Genres: Pop; R&B; alternative R&B
- Occupations: Singer, songwriter
- Instruments: Vocals; guitar
- Years active: 2012-present

Bar Tzabary (Hebrew: בר צברי; born June 10, 1992) is an Israeli singer-songwriter and actor.

Tzabary was born and raised in Hadera. He began his musical career in 2012 when he participated in the reality show "Eyal Golan is Calling You." During the audition, he sang the song "Now," which he wrote for his girlfriend, who died of cancer. The song was released as his debut single that year, under the musical production of Tamir Tzur. After Eyal Golan liked his audition performance and connected with the song story, he decided to produce the single for him.

In 2013, he released his debut album, "Now," on Play Records. The album includes an acoustic version of the song "Now" and a cover of Aviv Geffen's song, "Am I in Love with You?"

In 2017, he participated in rapper Tuna second album, "Tunapark," on the song "After Love."

In 2019, he participated in the musical This Is Me, based on the songs of Eyal Golan, alternating with Yossi Sheetrit, in the role of "Eliahu Elias."

In 2020, he released the first single from his second album, "Johnny." The song was well received by radio stations and even reached second place on the official Galgalatz chart and first place on Media Forest weekly radio airplay chart. It also received numerous streams, reaching second place on the weekly Israeli songs chart on the streaming media network Spotify.

Tzabari participated in a drama series on Yes Satellite TV: "Touching and Singing." He appeared alongside Sasson Gabay, Dafna Dekel, Joy Rieger, and others.

In 2022, he released the song "A Million Clouds" in collaboration with Yuval Dayan. That same year, he released the song "In the Next Chapter."

In 2023, he participated in the musical The Flower in My Garden, playing the role of Zohar Argov. On February 13, 2023, he released the single "Golot" alongside Micha Shitrit. On May 17, he released the single "Pazmon Poshod." On June 29, he released the single "I Screamed at Night." On July 3, 2023, he released his third album, "Free Joy." On October 29, 2023, he released the single "Don't Want to Be Sad."

On February 13, 2024, Tzabary released a song called "Wait for Me, Lover," which describes the struggle between love for one's homeland and love for one's beloved waiting at home. The song is accompanied by a music video featuring photographs sent by soldiers from the fighting during the Gaza war. On November 24, he released a song called "Khan Yunis," which reflects a soldier longing for his mother and describes the contrast with what he goes through during the war while serving in the reserve forces in Khan Yunis.

On February 16, 2025, Tzabary released the single "Jackie Chan." The song reached number six on the MediaForest chart.

== See also ==
- Ofer Levi
