= Frank Pelleg =

Musician and Composer

- פרנק פלג
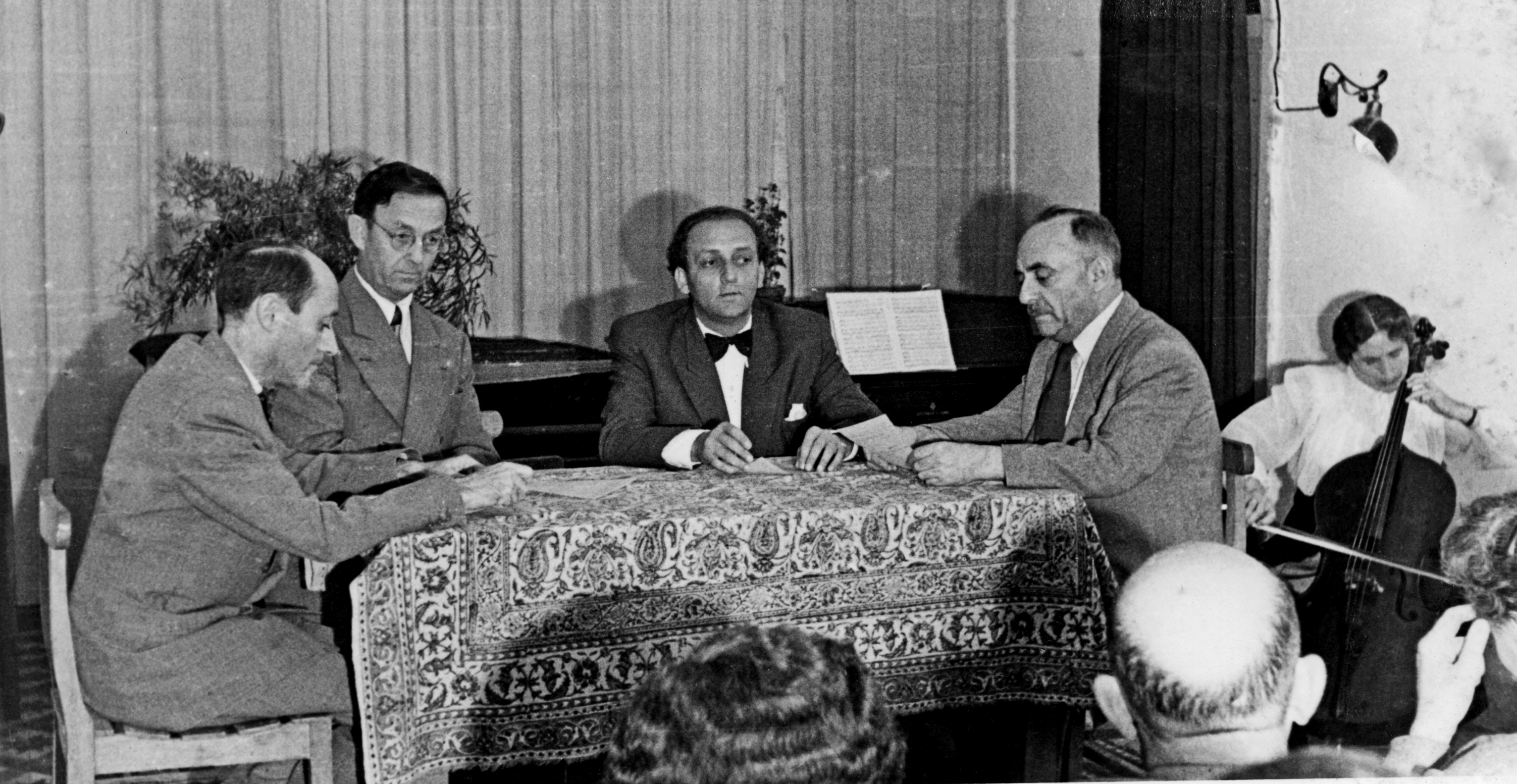
- Ceremony in the Jerusalem Music Academy. From left: Josef Tal, Alexander Dushkin, Frank Pelleg, Moshe Smoira, Thelma Yellin
- Born: September 24, 1910; Prague, Austria-Hungary
- Died: December 20, 1968 (aged 58); Haifa, Israel
- Era: 20th century

Frank Pelleg, also Peleg (Hebrew: פרנק פלג; September 24, 1910 – December 20, 1968) was an Austro-Hungarian Empire-born Israeli composer, pianist, conductor, and lecturer, known as the first harpsichordist in the country.

Pelleg specialized in performing works by Bach on the harpsichord and in 20th-century music, especially that of Arnold Schoenberg on the piano. Additionally, he composed music for theater and films.

== Life ==
Frank Pelleg was born Frank Pollak on 24 September 1910 in Prague, then part of the Austro-Hungarian Empire (now the capital of the Czech Republic).

From a young age, he performed as a soloist in concerts playing the piano and the harpsichord. He studied piano, composition, and conducting at the Czech Academy of Music and conducted the Prague Opera Orchestra until his immigration to Israel, at the initiative of Bronisław Huberman, in 1936 when he changed his surname.

After the state of Israel was established, he initiated the Cameri concerts at the Tel Aviv Museum of Art and served as the head of the music department at the Ministry of Education and Culture until 1952.

While fulfilling this role, he temporarily ceased his performances and focused on teaching. In a newspaper interview, he expressed the problematic status of music teachers in Israel and the level of musicians who leave Israel for abroad, presenting themselves there as "stars from Tel Aviv," a title that sometimes lacks substance. Among his students was Naomi Shemer.

In 1951, Pelleg settled in Haifa following an invitation from the city's mayor at the time, Abba Hushi. He established the Haifa Symphony Orchestra, in which he often appeared as a soloist. Frank Pelleg served as the conductor and musical director of the Technion Orchestra for several years. He also served as the first musical director of the Haifa Theater.

In 1956, Pelleg went to Poland as Israel's first representative. Upon his arrival in Poland, he was requested to play "modern music", especially after the ban on such music had finally been lifted beyond the Iron Curtain. During the visit, Pelleg met with many Jews, some of whom openly declared their Judaism with pride, while others whispered about it secretly.

Pelleg participated in the popular radio program of Kol Yisrael, "Shlosha BeSirah Achat" (Three in One Pot) from 1956 to 1959. He primarily collaborated with Dan Almagor and the Theater Club Quartet in composing lyrics for satirical songs, including "Az Ma Im Anachnu MeRehovot" (So What If We're from Rehovot), "Arba Ze Mispar Mazzal" (Four is a Lucky Number), the musical contest "HaZemer HaIvri" (The Hebrew Song), and the closing song for the end of the program - "Shir HaKabranim" (The Gravediggers' Song).

Frank Pelleg opposed the approach that performing Bach's works requires strict adherence to the 17th-century style. He conveyed this approach to 15 excellent musicians participating in an international seminar in Saint Moritz, Switzerland, where he was invited in the spring of 1963. Pelleg supported a more reasonable approach to performing Bach's works and opposed an overly rigid approach that insisted on authentic performance and playing on instruments close to those from Bach's time, while ignoring innovations introduced since then.

Frank Pelleg died in Haifa due to a heart attack and was buried in the Hof HaCarmel Cemetery. He left behind his wife, two daughters, and grandchildren.

After his death, the Ministry of Education decided to award a prize in his name for many years of high-level artistic activity. In addition, a street in the Denia neighborhood of Haifa was named after him.
