= Ori Toledano =

Israeli musician

Ori Toledano אוֹרִי טולדנו
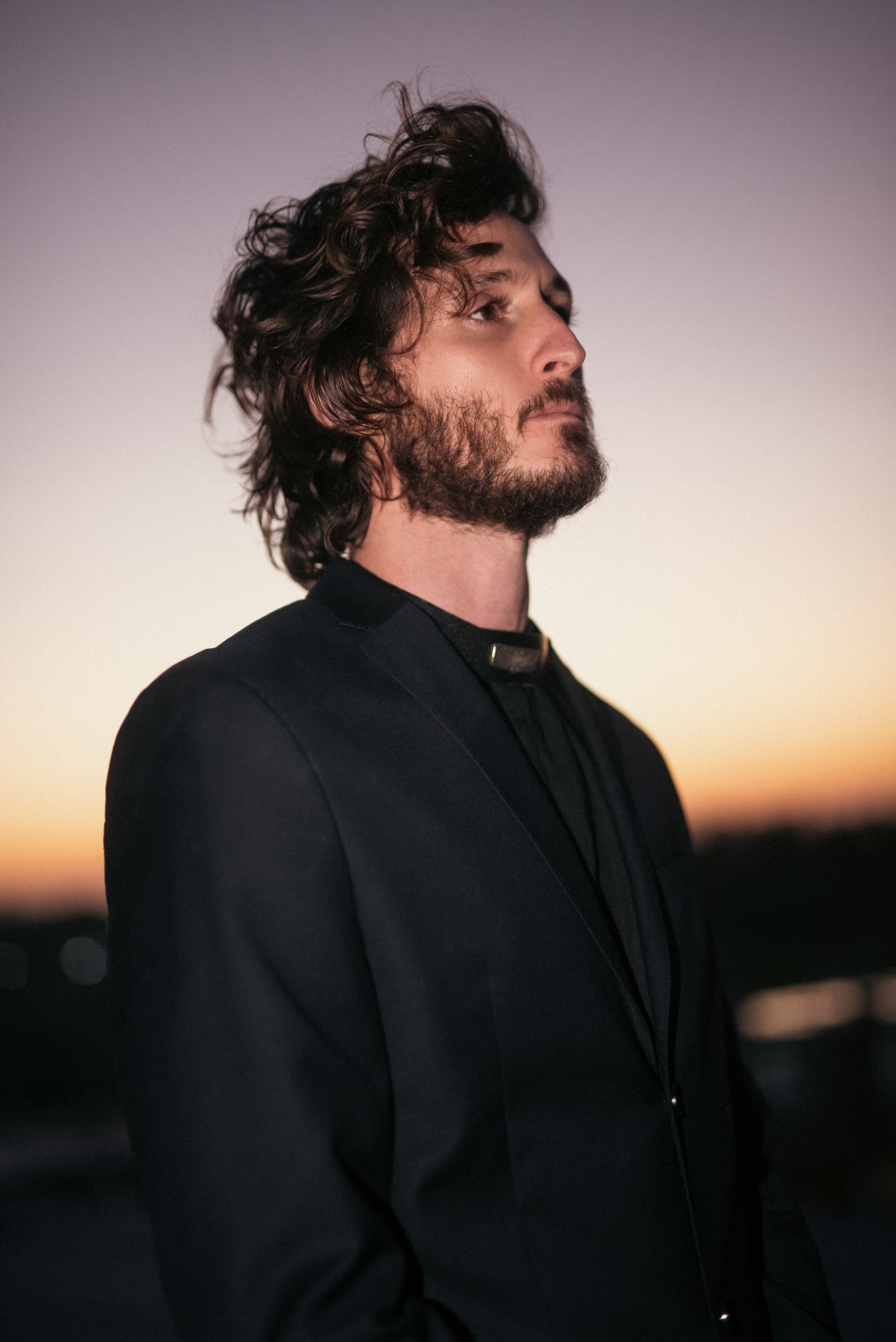
- Toledano in 2018

Background information
- Also known as: KAYMA
- Born: March 21, 1985 (age 41); Tel Aviv, Israel
- Genres: Rock; Pop
- Occupations: Singer; songwriter; musician
- Instruments: Guitar, bass, synthesizer, piano, drums
- Years active: 2006–present
- Website: modekayma
- Father: Avi Toledano
- Relatives: Lihi Toledano (half-sister)

Ori Toledano (Hebrew: אוֹרִי טולדנו; born on March 21, 1985) is a creative artist, singer, and music producer Israeli known by his stage name – "KAYMA" ("Sustainable" in Hebrew).

== Background ==
Ori Toledano was born in Tel Aviv to Liora Gal and the singer Avi Toledano, who represented Israel in the Eurovision 1982 contest. Toledano has two older brothers, Eran and Tal and three younger siblings from his father's second marriage, including the singer Lihi Toledano.

In 2005, after his Military service, Toledano moved to the US and moved between New York City, Nashville, Miami and Los Angeles, where he eventually lived for about four years. During his stay in the USA, he studied sound and music production at the prestigious SAE Institute, and began writing, narrating and producing jingles for advertisements for an Israeli TV channel abroad.

In 2009, upon his return to Israel, Ori founded the "Stereotype" bar at 99 Allenby Street, and at the same time, lectured and coordinated the sound engineering course at the Ono Academic College.

In 2014, together with his partner, he founded the music company and recording studio Snowstar.Company, under which he wrote and produced original music for television series and composed commercial jingles for large companies and famous brands, including: Goldstar Beer, Soda Stream, Fiber, Intel, Subaru, Unilever, Waves Audio, Fatal Hotels, Bank Leumi and more.

== Career ==
In 2021 Toledano launched his solo career under the stage name "KAYMA". KAYMA's first solo single, called "Onsitelover", was released in May of the same year, and was accompanied by a music video that was shot in Kyiv several months before the Russian invasion of Ukraine broke out. The song entered the playlists of leading radio stations in Israel and Europe.

In November 2021 he released a second single, "Learn to Say No", which reached number one on the Italian official radio chart (Earone). "Learn to Say No" was the third most played songs on Spotify Italy and entered the playlists of major radio stations in Israel, Germany and Italy. With this single KAYMA became one of the most played artists in Italy. The music video for the song, which Toledano wrote and directed himself, entered the official playlists of MTV and VH1 in Italy.

After the first two singles, Toledano released his first EP called "Mid Side Notes", which included 4 songs and another special rendition of "Onsitelover", from a live show he filmed at Emmanuel Church with 11 musicians and backing singers.

In June 2022 KAYMA went on tour in Germany together with the band Lola Marsh, for which he also produced two songs on the album "Shot Shot Cherry".

In the summer of 2022 Keima was invited to perform at a number of large festivals in Italy including: Battiti live, where he performed in front of an audience of about 40,000 people. As part of his activities in Italy, he was covered in the magazines including Elle, billboard, Panorama, and Corriere della sera.

In December 2022, with the release of his third single "Bad Blood", KAYMA was invited to perform at the Vatican at an event marked by world peace, where he was also invited to meet Pope Francis. The event was broadcast on national television Canale 5 to about 60 million viewers in Italy. At the event, KAYMA appeared alongside international artists such as Amy Lee, Riccardo Cocciante José Carreras, and Aka7.

In June 2023, KAYMA made his debut at The Barbie Club in Tel Aviv, with a promise to release the debut album "New Trying Outs" on October 13.

Due to 2023 Hamas-led attack on Israel, the release date of the album was postponed to April 12, 2024. In December 2023, he released the song "Dancing on dust" in memory of those murdered in the Nova Festival.

== Personal life ==
During his stay in the US, Toledano got married, but later divorced after two years of marriage. Toledano currently lives jointly with Dalit Namirovsky and their two children, Elia who was born in 2015 and Jonathan from Nemirovsky's previous relationships.

== Discography ==
Singles

- Onsitelover (July 28, 2021)
- Learn To Say No (November 23, 2021)
- Learn To Say No – Radio Edit (April 1, 2022)
- Mid Side Notes E.P (June 24, 2022) [Onsitelover, Learn To Say No, Mama, Sympathy, Onsitlover (live from Immanuel church, Jaffa 2021)]
- Bad Blood (January 20, 2023)
- Blue (May 18, 2023)
- World on a Wait (September 11, 2023)
- Dancing On Dust (December 21, 2023)
