= Avi Toledano =

Israeli singer and songwriter (born 1948)

Avi Toledano אבי טולדנו
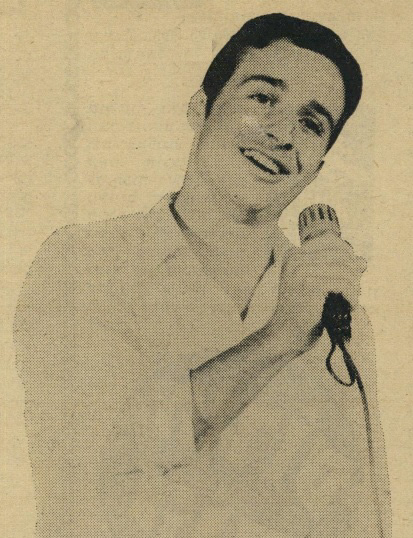

Background information
- Born: Avraham Toledano אברהם טולדנו; April 4, 1948 (age 78); Meknes, Morocco
- Genre: Pop music
- Occupations: Singer, lyricist, composer
- Years active: 1969–
- Children: 6, including Ori and Lihi

Avi Toledano (Hebrew: אבי טולדנו; born April 4, 1948) is an Israeli singer and songwriter.

== Biography ==
Avraham ("Avi") Toledano was born in Meknes, Morocco to a Jewish family. At the age of 5, the family relocated to Casablanca, where Toledano attended the Alliance Israélite Universelle. During his teenage years, he was involved in Labour Zionist youth movement Hashomer Hatzair, which was illegal in Morocco at the time.

In 1965, at the age of 16, he immigrated to Israel with other members of Hashomer Hatzair, and settled in Kibbutz Ruhama in the Negev.

== Career ==
Toledano debuted as a singer as a teenager, after sending demo tapes to the radio show "First Returns" ("תשואות ראשונות"). Composer Moshe Wilensky encouraged him to perform his song "Zohi Yafo" live on the program.

Toledano spent his period of military service as a member of the Armored Corps Troupe (להקת גייסות השריון), one of the Israeli Defense Force's military bands. He released his first solo album in 1968.

In 1969, he participated in the Israel Song Festival, performing "The Spirit" ("את הרוח"), written by Rimona Dinur and Rafi Ben-Moshe, and "On the Way Back" ("בדרך חזרה"), written by Ehud Manor and Nurit Hirsch; Toledano came in third place. His second album, Avi, was released the same year, and included two songs by Manor and Hirsch, "How Time Passes" and "I Saw the Summer". Other songs included on this album were a Hebrew cover of Mary Hopkin's "This is the Day", translated by Mickey Hartaby (also performed by Shuli Natan), and a Hebrew translation of Tom Jones's "Delilah". Toledano's successes led to him being named "Singer of the Year".

In 1970, his third album, Misty Garden, was released, and Toledano subsequently won the first Israeli Children's Song Festival, alongside the 10-year-old Irit Anavi. That same year, he published his fourth album, National Songs, with Hebrew translations of international songs.

Toledano continued to perform and release albums into the late 1970s, as well as acting in a number of Israeli films. Towards the end of the 1970s he toured Europe, and in 1978 released another solo album, La Boheme, singing the songs of Charles Aznavour. Aznavour attended the premier of this tour.

In 1979, Toledano composed the song "Paid in Anger" ("שולם ברוגז") which was the winning entry at the 10th Israeli Children's Song Festival, performed by Mike Burstein.

In 1981, Toledano won Kdam Eurovision, Israel's pre-Eurovision competition, with the song "Carnival". The following year, Toledano represented Israel in the Eurovision Song Contest 1982 with "Hora", written by Yoram Taharlev. The song led Toledano to second place, earning 100 points, 61 points behind runaway winner, German representative Nicole. Toledano subsequently composed the Israeli entry for the Eurovision Song Contest 1983, "Chai", which was performed by Ofra Haza and also won second place.

In 1986, Toledano wrote "L'chaim" for Haim Moshe, which came third place in Kdam Eurovision. In 1989, Toledano again competed in Kdam Eurovision, finishing in second place, and in 1991 he composed "Hava Nagila Discovered" for Uri Feynman's entry to the contest.

Toledano has continued to release albums and appear on television into the 2010s. In 2011 he was a contestant on Channel 24 reality show "Hall of Fame" ("היכל התהילה"), finishing in fourth place. Beginning in 2017, he appeared on the Channel 2 television show "Eighties" ("שנות ה-80").

== Personal life ==
Avi Toledano has three children with his first wife, Liora, who was also the subject of his eponymous song. One of his children, Tal Toledano, is a singer and host of Israel's Channel 1. His youngest son, from his marriage to Liora, is musician and international producer Ori Toledano.

He remarried in 1998 to Hagit Levi, the sister of Mizrahi singer Ofer Levi. The couple has three children together, including Lihi Toledano, who participated in the 2020 edition of the Rising Star song contest. Toledano and Levi divorced in 2014.

Toledano currently resides in Gan Yavne.

In a 2026 interview, Toledano said that he begins each day with Modeh Ani and tefillin and reads Psalms daily. He also said that his household observes Kiddush on both Friday night and Shabbat day, as well as Birkat Hamazon after the Shabbat meal.

== See also ==
- Music of Israel
- Culture of Israel
- Hora (song)

Awards and achievements
| Preceded by Hakol Over Habibi with Halayla | Israel in the Eurovision Song Contest; 1982 | Succeeded by Ofra Haza with Khay |
