= Ariel Horowitz =

Israeli musical artist

Ariel Horowitz אריאל הורוביץ
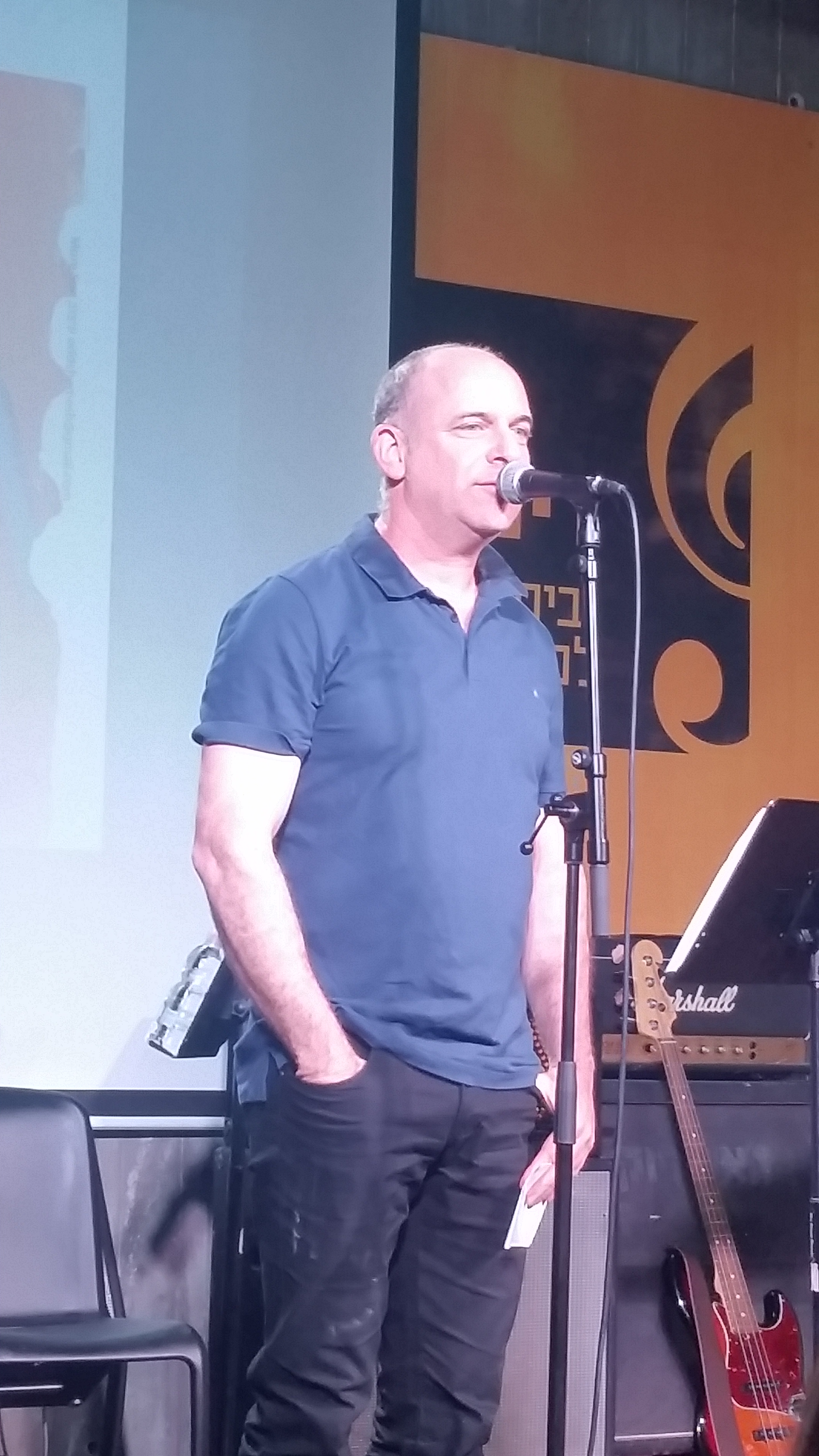
- Horowitz in 2017

Background information
- Born: 10 January 1970 (age 55)
- Genres: soul|R&B
- Occupations: Singer
- Years active: 1998–present

Ariel Horowitz (Hebrew: אריאל הורוביץ; born 10 January 1970) is an Israeli singer-songwriter, and the son of the late Naomi Shemer, widely regarded as one of Israel's most important songwriters. He is married to the Israeli singer Tamar Giladi.

He has released six albums: Yallah Bye (1998), Renée (2002), Menase Sefer (2004), Zman Emet (2008), Album 5 (2010), and HaGiborim Sheli (2013).

The song "Yallah Bye" was one of the most played songs on Voice of Israel, an Israeli radio station, in 1998.

In 2023 he published a book, the debut novel The Golem from Prague's concert tour (published by Yediot Books).
