= Dina Golan =

Israeli singer and actress (1946–2011)

Dina Golan דינה גולן
- Born: 27 February 1946; Tel Aviv, Mandatory Palestine
- Died: 30 June 2011 (aged 65) Tel Aviv, Israel
- Genres: World; Musical theatre
- Occupations: Singer; actress
- Instrument: Vocals
- Years active: 1966–2011

Dina Golan (Hebrew: דינה גולן; 27 February 1946 – 30 June 2011) was an Israeli singer and actress.

== Biography ==
In the early stages of her career, Golan was chosen among 300 participants to take part in an all-female vocalist group during the mid 1960s and with them, she performed at the Song & Chorus Festival in 1966 and recorded several songs originally recorded by artists such as Nurit Hirsh, Yaakov Rotblit and Ehud Manor. She eventually left the group.

In 1970, Golan moved to Australia and performed for Jewish communities, which were very well received and got her attention from the media. After returning to Israel, Golan performed at the Hassidic Song Festival dressed in Australian attire. She then took to starring in the musical theatre. Among her most popular stage performances was in the stage adaptation of The Travels of Benjamin III, in which she sang the songs written by Naomi Shemer. She also starred in Les Misérables at the Cameri Theatre. Other stage adaptations included Fiddler on the Roof, The Sound of Music, Kazablan, A Streetcar Named Desire and many other plays and musicals throughout her career.

On screen, Golan appeared on some episodes of the children's television shows Bli Sodot and BeSod HaYinyanim. She also appeared in numerous commercials to promote Burgeranch and she appeared in a PSA alongside Ronit Elkabetz to speak about poultry consumption in India. In 1982, Golan appeared in the film Dead End Street.

In 1997, Golan provided the Hebrew voice of Thalia the Muse of Comedy in the Disney animated film Hercules. By the 21st century, she appeared in further musical production adaptations which include Annie among others.

=== Personal life ===
Golan had two children, Noa and Omar. Through Noa, she also had three granddaughters.

== Death ==
Golan died after suffering from cancer on 30 June 2011, at the age of 65.
