= Lihi Toledano =

Israeli singer-songwriter and actress (born 2002)

- ליהי טולדנו
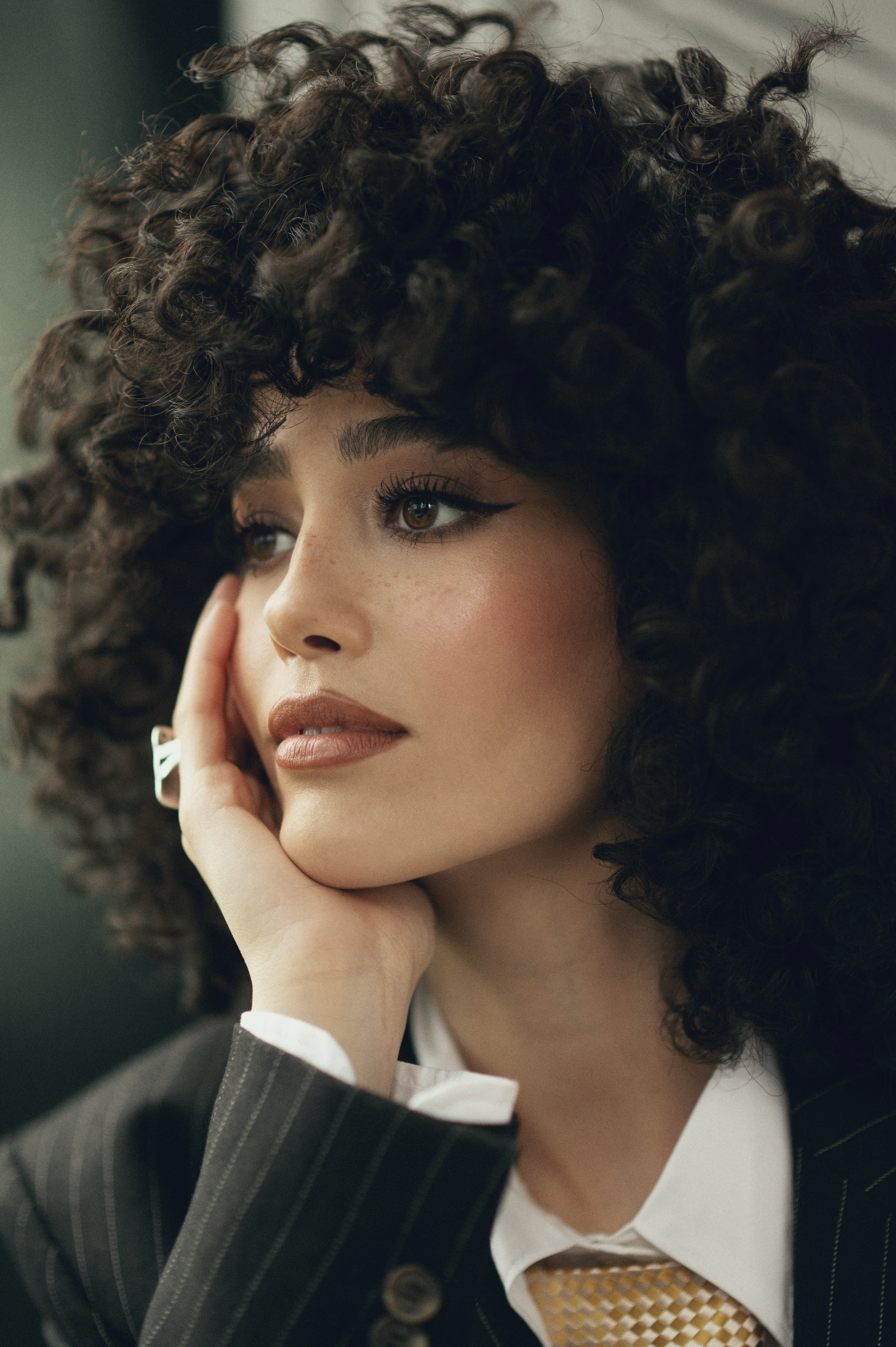
- Lihi Toledano
- Born: 20 April 2002 (age 24); Herzliya, Israel
- Occupations: Singer-songwriter; actress
- Years active: 2018–present
- Father: Avi Toledano
- Relatives: Ori Toledano (half-brother); Ofer Levi (uncle)

Lihi Toledano (Hebrew: ליהי טולדנו; born 20 April 2002) is an Israeli singer-songwriter and actress.

== Biography ==
Lihi Toledano was born in Herzliya and raised in Gan Yavne. She is the daughter of singer Avi Toledano and Hagith Levy-Toledano, a sales manager. Toledano is also the niece of singer Ofer Levi and has five brothers and sisters, one of whom is singer Ori Toledano.

Toledano attended the Ben-Gurion Elementary School in Gan Yavne, and then the Ort Rabin Middle School. In her youth, she studied classical, jazz, modern, hip-hop and lyrical dance at the N.C-SHOW studio. When she was 15, she began studying theater at the Thelma Yellin National High School for the Arts, where she played, among other things, the lead role in the musical "Gypsy."

In 2018, when she was in the 10th grade, she released her first single, "My Heart is on 200". In 2019, she participated in the seventh season of the reality show "Rising Star" but did not continue after the second audition. That same year, her second single, "Paris", was released.

In 2020, she began her service in the IDF, where she served in the Education Corps Band and the IDF Theater until her discharge in 2022.

In 2022, she participated in the series "Miukhedet" (Special) as Shir, the group's photographer and Maya's best friend. That same year, she participated in the series "Who Heard of Hava and Nava" as part of the members of the Armored Corps band in 1974. In addition, she was chosen to play the lead role in the new version of the musical "Mary Lou", based on the poems of Svika Pick at the National Theater and directed by Tzadi Tsartafati.

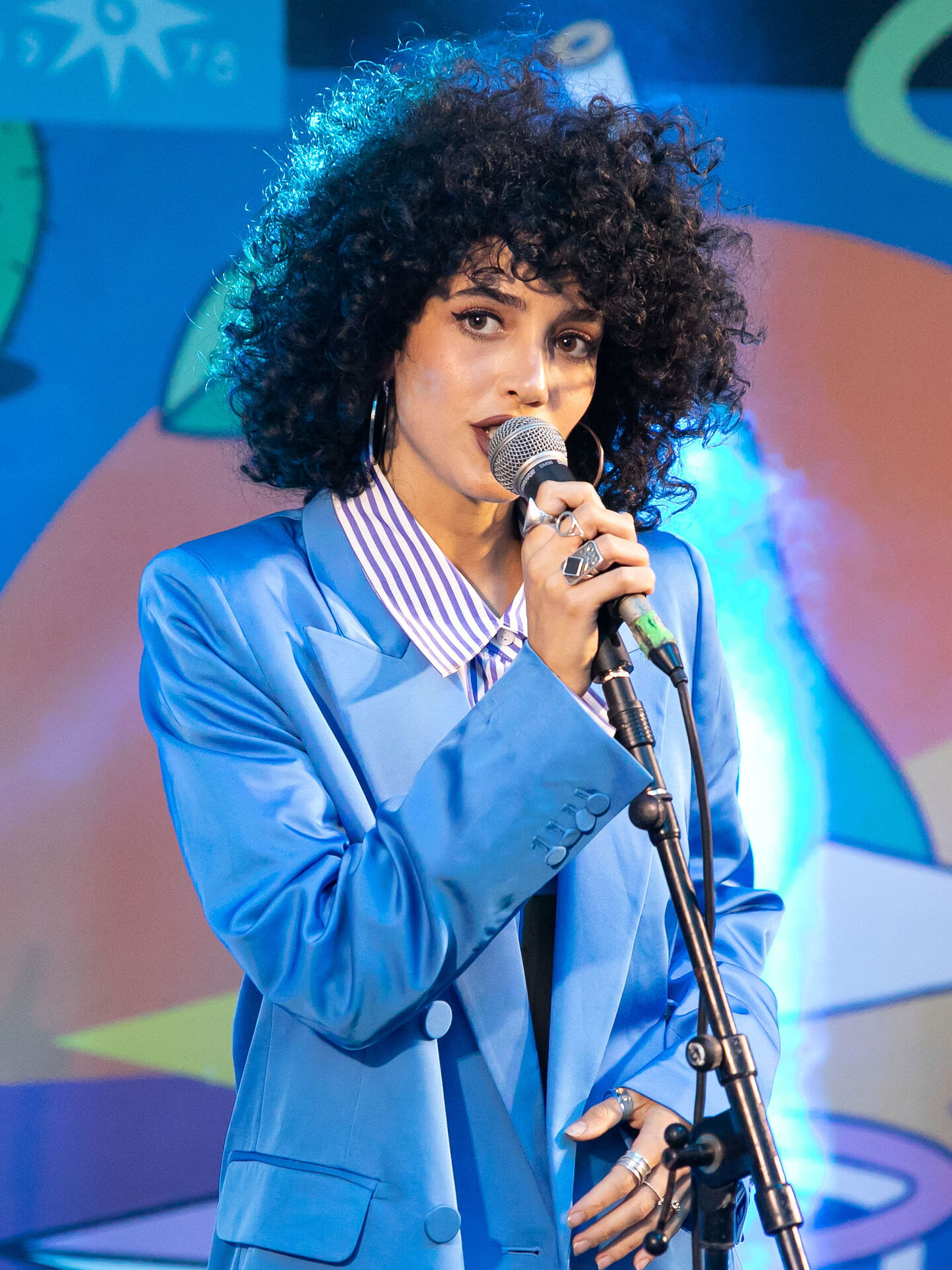
Lihi Toledano at a performance, 2023

In 2023, she released the single "The Gray Suit", which she wrote and composed about her relationship with Talia Bertfeld, who was her partner for a year and a half. Later that year, she participated in the youth musical drama "Talatha" in a leading role. In May 2023, her second single, "Billy", was released, which she also wrote and composed herself. Her next single, "20 (Without You)", was released three months later. In January 2024, she released another single - "Meant for Me". On February 21, 2024, she released her first album, "Who Do I Think I Am".

During 2024, Toledano appeared on the docu-reality show "Connected", in which she stars in the premiere episode in a special episode due to the Gaza war. The series aired in September of that year. On May 9th of that year, the compilation album "Israel Entertainment - Singing for the State" was released, where Toledano performed the song "Song of the Shafshaf" alongside Eliav Zohar. On September 2, Toledano released three new songs, including the song "Abba", a song about her complex relationship with her father, singer Avi Toledano. The song "Abba" contains sections written in the first person, in which Lihi addresses her father and asks for forgiveness and a hug. The other songs released alongside "Abba" are "Michal" (a cover version of a song by Eliav Zohar) and "Final Equilibrium", a new version of a song from Toledano's debut album. On December 5, she released the single "Unintentionally", written and produced by Ofiri.

== Personal life ==
Toledano has identified herself in various interviews as bisexual and pansexual, and has had several relationships with women.

== Discography ==
=== Albums ===
- Who Do I Think I Am (2024)
- Courage (2025)

=== Singles ===
| Name | Year | Album |
|---|---|---|
| My Heart is on 200 (הלב שלי על 200) | 2018 | No album |
| Paris (פריז) | 2019 | No album |
| The Gray Suit (החליפה האפורה) | 2023 | Who Do I Think I Am |
| Billie (בילי) | 2023 | Who Do I Think I Am |
| 20 (Without You) ((בלעדייך) 20) | 2023 | Who Do I Think I Am |
| Meant for Me (נועדת לי) | 2024 | Who Do I Think I Am |
| Gan Yavne (גן יבנה) | 2024 | Who Do I Think I Am |
| Unintentional (לא בכוונה) | 2024 | No album |
| Mademoiselle (מדמואזל) | 2025 | Courage |
| If You Don't Take Care of Me (אם לא דואגים לי) | 2025 | Courage |

== Awards and nominations ==
| Award | Year | Category | Nominated for | Result |
|---|---|---|---|---|
| Froggy Annual Awards | 2022 | Breakthrough Performance of the Year Award | "Meukedet" (Special) | Nominated |
