= Naomi Shemer =

Israeli musician (1930–2004)

Naomi Shemer נעמי שמר

Background information
- Born: Naomi Sapir; 13 July 1930; Kvutzat Kinneret, Israel
- Died: 26 June 2004 (aged 73) Tel Aviv-Yafo, Israel
- Genres: World; folk
- Occupations: Singer; songwriter; composer; poet
- Instruments: Vocals; piano
- Years active: 1951-2004
- Formerly of: The Nahal Singers
- Spouses: Gideon Shemer (m. 1954; div. 1968); Mordechai Horowitz (m. 1969)

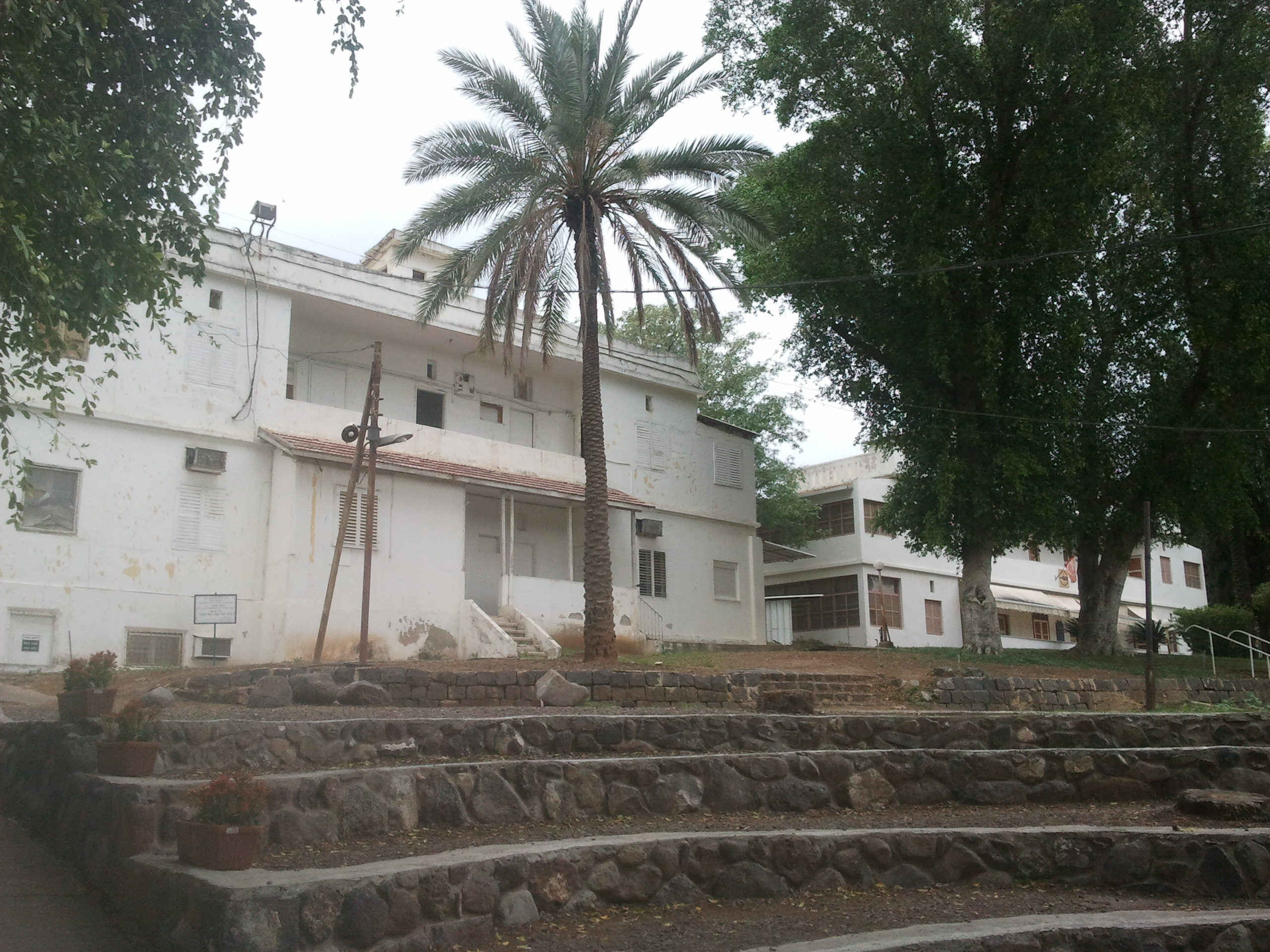
Naomi Shemer's childhood home in Kvutzat Kinneret. This was one of the first 3 houses to be built and populated in 1929

Naomi Shemer (Hebrew: נׇעֳמִי שֶׁמֶר; 13 July 1930 – 26 June 2004) was an Israeli songwriter, composer, and performer, widely described as the "first lady of Israeli song". She became one of the most influential figures in modern Hebrew music, writing numerous songs that became cultural touchstones, most notably "Yerushalayim Shel Zahav" ("Jerusalem of Gold"), which gained prominence after the Six-Day War and is often regarded as a second national anthem. Over a career spanning several decades, Shemer created music for adults and children, contributed to major festivals and cultural events, and became widely recognized for shaping the Israeli songbook.

== Early life ==
Shemer was born Naomi Sapir (נעמי ספיר) to Rivka and Meir Sapir, Lithuanian Jewish immigrants to Israel, in Kvutzat Kinneret, a kibbutz they helped establish on the Sea of Galilee. In 1935, she and her mother visited Vilnius, where they met her father's sister Berta and her family. Many of Shemer's European relatives were later killed during the Holocaust.

Encouraged by her mother, Shemer started playing the piano at the age of six. After graduating from Jordan Valley High School, she postponed her military service to study music at the Israeli Conservatory in Tel Aviv (later the Tel Aviv Academy of Music), although some members of the kibbutz opposed this decision. She then continued at the Jerusalem Academy of Music and Dance, where she studied under several notable teachers, including Paul Ben-Haim, Frank Pelleg, Abel Ehrlich, Ilona Vincze-Kraus, and Josef Tal.

After completing her musical training, she returned to Kvutzat Kinneret and worked as a children's music teacher. Shemer composed some of her earliest works during this period, including "The Mail Arrived Today" and "Our Little Brother", the latter about her brother, Yankale. These songs later appeared on Yafa Yarkoni's 1958 album, Songs from Kinneret.

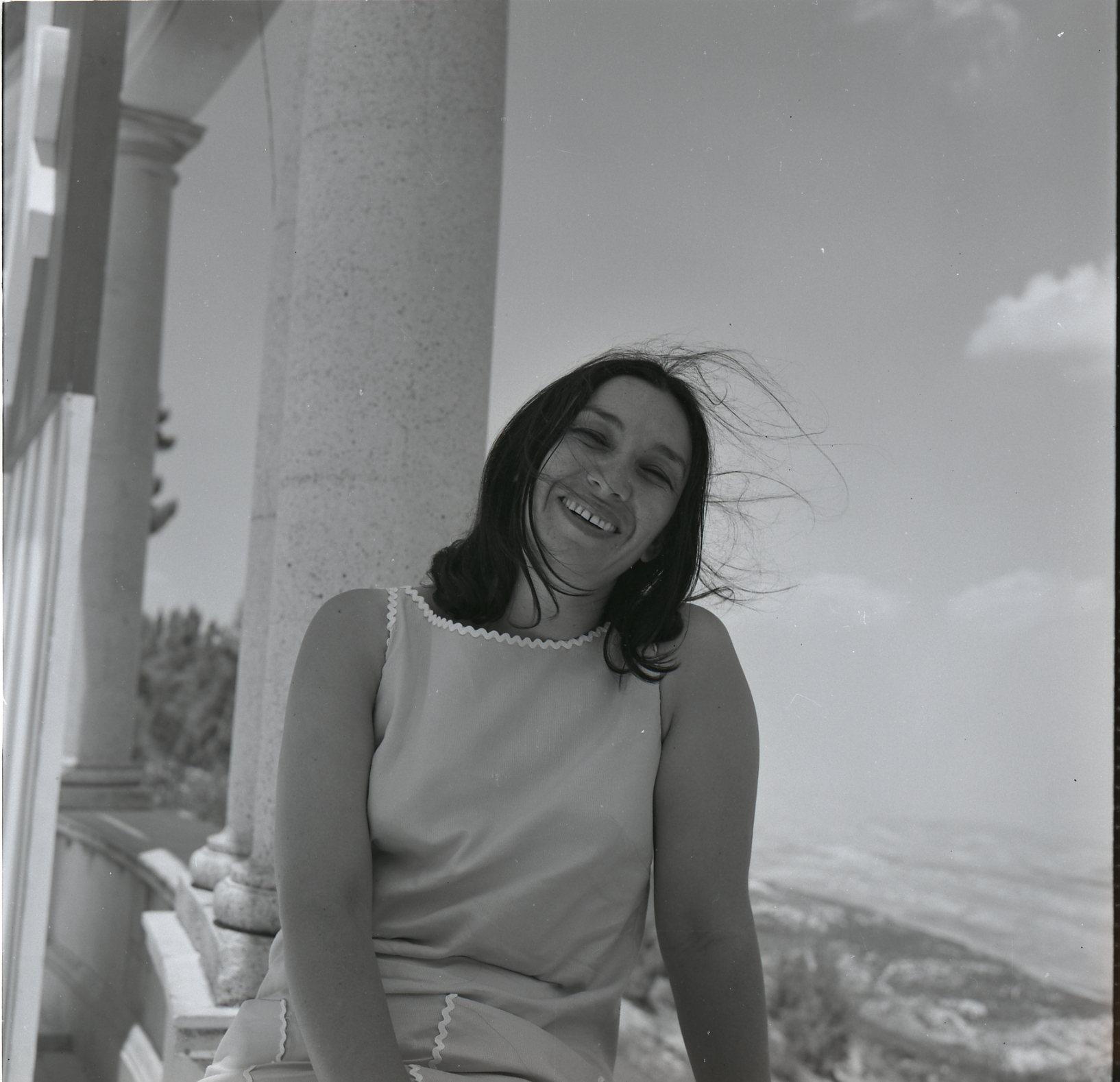
Naomi Shemer

In 1951, after a deferment of about four years, she enlisted in the Israeli Defense Forces, where she served as a pianist in The Nahal Singers, a secondary troupe to the Nahal Band.

== Career ==
=== Early career (1950s–early 1960s) ===
After completing her military service, Shemer began writing songs for the theater. She collaborated with composer Yochanan Zarai on the musical Peshita Al Ha-Kfar, for which she wrote lyrics under the pen name S. Carmel. Songs from the musical that later became well known include "Tarnegol Ben-Gever", "Rav Ha'Or VeHa'Tchelet", and "Shir HaBar". Following that, she wrote tunes for Ha'Ikar VeBat Ha'Ikar (The Farmer and the Farmer's Daughter) at the Ohel Theater.

Chaim Topol invited Shemer to write songs for the newly-formed band Batzal Yarok. Her first song for the group, "Mishirei Zener Noded" (better known as "Haderech Aruka Hi Varba"), written in 1957, achieved wide popularity and is often described as her first hit. Her autobiographical song "Noa" was also included in the band's first revue. For the show Daber El Hakir, staged at the Sambation Theater in 1958, she wrote and composed the song "Halayla Holech Ba'Sderot", which was performed in the show by Shimon Israeli.

Shemer wrote several successful songs for Israeli military ensembles including "Chamsinim Ba-Mashlat", and "Hakol Biglal Masmer" (based on "For Want of a Nail"). During the same period, she wrote the lyrics under the pen name "Alifaz" for the Dudaim songs "Kibui Orot" and "Shayeret Ha-Rokhvim". Additionally, Shemer wrote "Ir Levana", performed by the singer Loolik in a short film about Tel Aviv-Yafo.

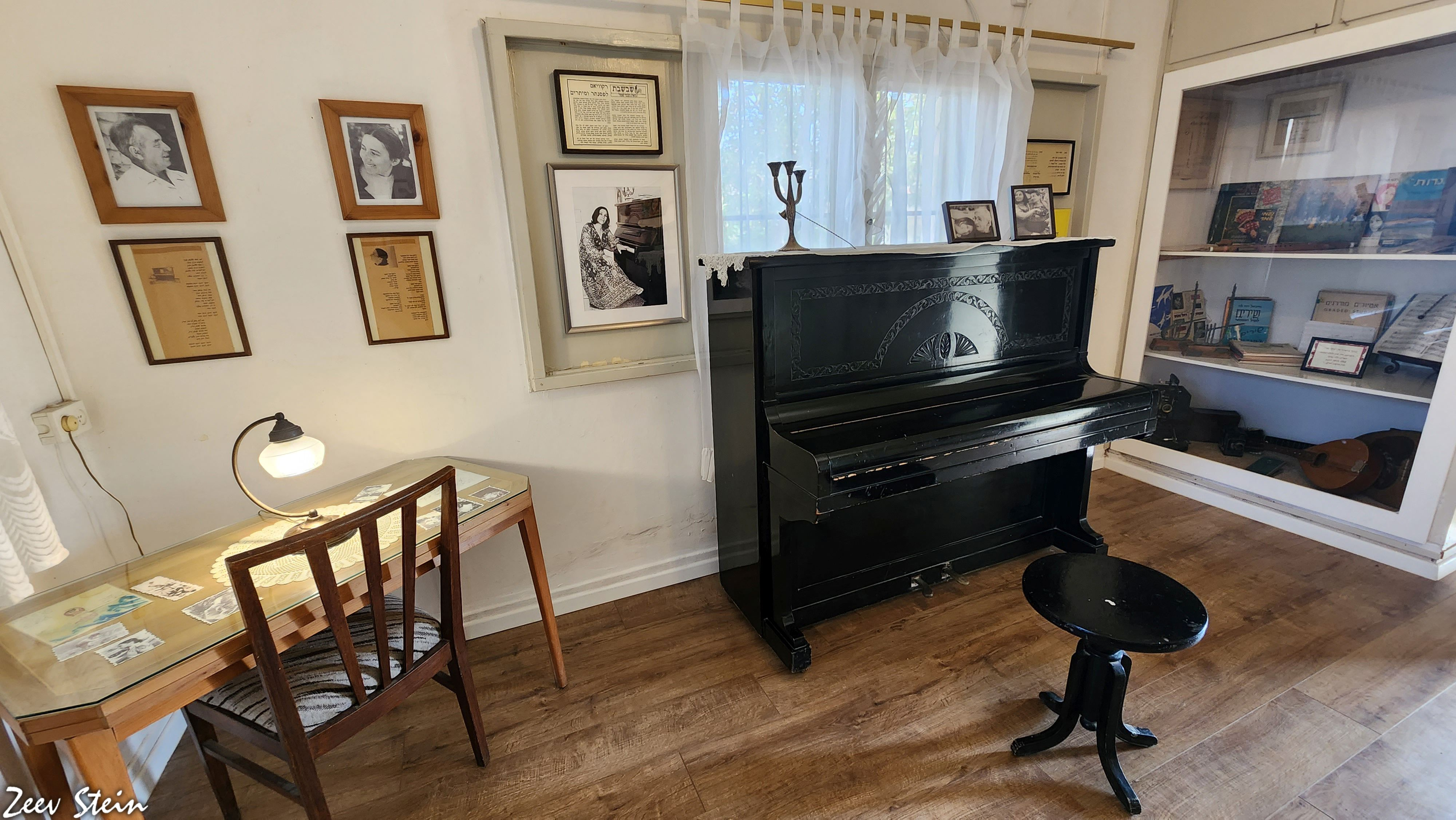
The house of Naomi Shemer

In 1958, Shemer wrote "Hopa Hey" for an IDF program on Kol Israel. Two years later, the chorus that performed it won first prize in a competition in Italy. In 1960, she wrote song including "Bessadeh Tiltan" for the Northern Command Band, "Leil Emesh" performed by Shaike Levi, and "Shir Hashuk" for the play Aseret Hatzadikim which was recorded by HaTarnegolim in 1961.

At the end of 1960, Shemer embarked on a nine-month tour in the United States. In 1962, she wrote "Achrei Hashkiaa Basadeh" for the Shiriyon Men's Choir. She later collaborated with the Nahal Band on songs like "Machar" ("Tomorrow"), "Mitriyah Beshnayim" ("Umbrella for Two"), and "Mahbo'im" ("Hide and Seek").

In 1963, Shemer wrote "Chorshat Ha-Ekaliptus" ("The Eucalyptus Grove") about Kvutzat Kinneret for the musical Keytzad Shovrim Chamsin. The same year, she composed the music for the song "Kinneret" written by Rachel Bluwstein, for the Central Command Band.

In 1964, Shemer wrote songs for the Yarkon Bridge Trio's debut album First Love, including "Ahavat Poalei Habinyan", "Serenade Lah", "Ayelet Ahavim", and "Layla Bachof Achziv", which was also featured in the movie Dalia and the Sailors. That year, Shemer traveled to Paris with her daughter where she wrote songs reflecting chansonnier influences, such as "Ha'ir Be'afar" for the Yarkon Bridge Trio, and wrote Hebrew lyrics for French songs such as "Ilu Tziporim" (originally by Jean-Pierre Calvet and Jean Broussolle), "Shilgiya" (originally by Guy Béart), and "Ein Ahavot Smechot" (originally by Georges Brassens). Several of these lyrical adaptations were recorded by Yossi Banai.

After Shemer returned to Israel, producer Asher Havaquin approached her in 1966 and suggested forming a female quartet. Shemer established The Shemer Sisters, consisting of Dina Golan, Dalia Oren, Amna Goldstein, and Ruthy Bikal. Batya Strauss served as the musical director. The quartet's program included "Begani", "Zemer", and "Shiro Shel Aba". Financial difficulties ultimately caused the quartet to disband.

=== "Yerushalayim Shel Zahav" (1967) ===
Shemer wrote one of her best-known songs, "Yerushalayim Shel Zahav" ("Jerusalem of Gold"), in 1967. The song gained immense popularity in Israel after the Six-Day War, with some suggesting it should replace the national anthem.

Since the release of the song, Shemer has been regarded by many as Israel's "national songwriter," seen as embodying Israel's spiritual values and sentiments through her music, though she may not have viewed herself in this way.

In May 2005, Haaretz reported that Shemer admitted in a letter to Gil Aldema that she plagiarized Paco Ibáñez's cover of the Navarerrese folk song "Pello Joxepe" while composing the melody of the song. In 1962, Paco Ibáñez performed "Pello Joxepe" in Israel, when Shemer might have heard it. During her lifetime, Shemer had denied allegations of plagiarism, referring to its similarity as an "unfortunate accident." Shemer stated that the controversy caused her significant distress. Hebrew song researcher Eliyahu Hacohen did not view the resemblance as plagiarism but rather as an acceptable influence in the songwriting process.

=== Post Six-Day War (Late 1960s–1973) ===
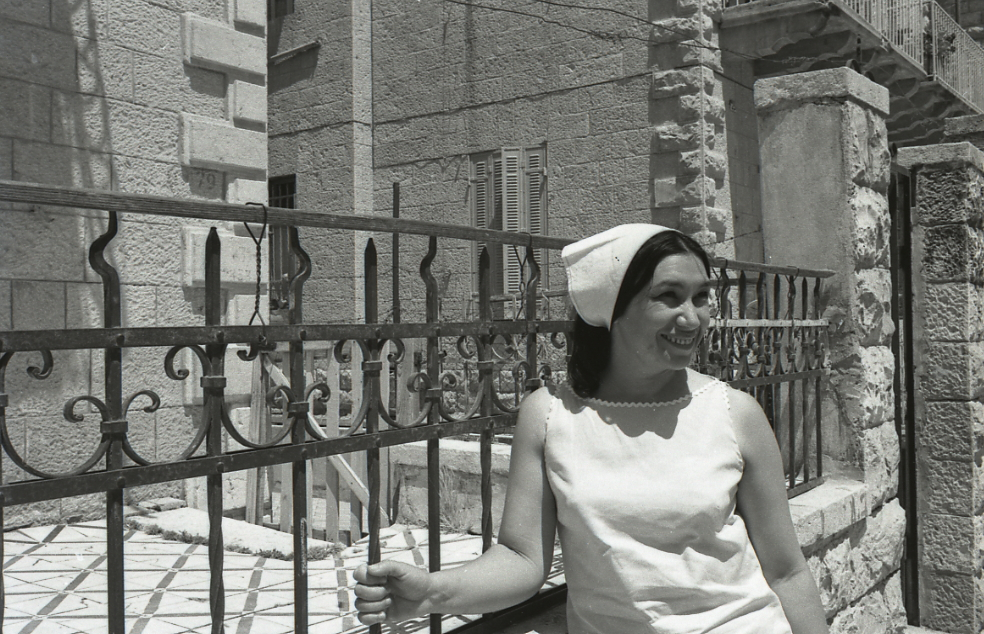
Naomi Shemer in Jerusalem, 1967

At the beginning of 1968, Shemer published her first book, All the Songs, featuring 42 of her works, 34 of which were published for the first time.

In March 1968, Shemer received an honorary degree from the Women's Organization of Yeshiva University for "Yerushalayim Shel Zahav", which she received at a festive dinner at the Waldorf-Astoria Hotel in Manhattan. Following the ceremony, she embarked on a concert tour that lasted several weeks, visiting major cities in the United States and Canada.

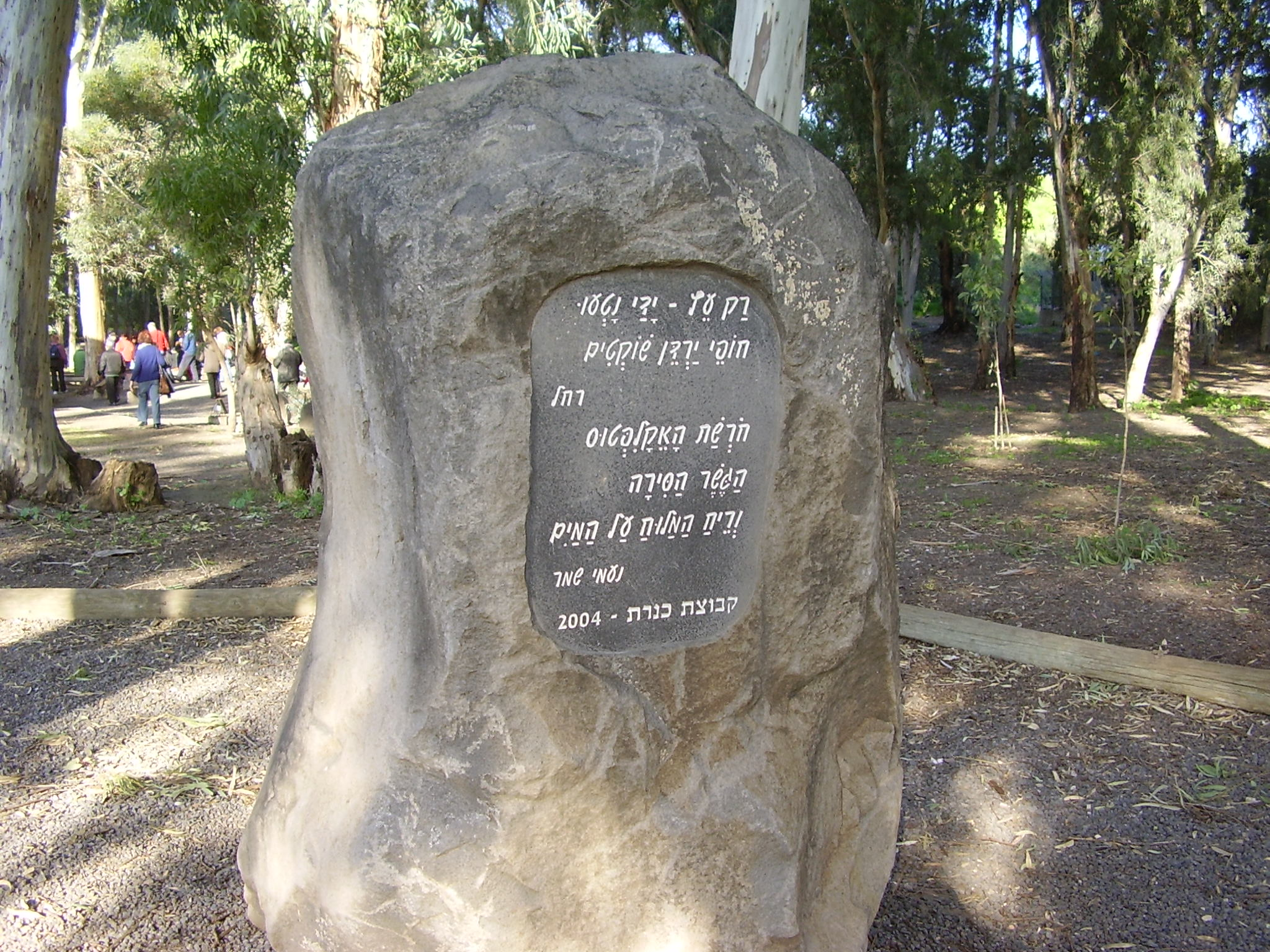
Eucalyptus grove named after Shemer

Between the Six-Day War and the Yom Kippur War, Shemer continued to write songs, including "Shvachey Ma'oz" ("In Praise of Ma'oz"), and "Be'eretz Lahad'am" ("In the Land of Thing-That-Never-Happened").

The 1967 Nahal Band album, The Nahal Soldiers Are Coming, featured the first recording of Shemer's song "Valse LeHaganat HaTzomach" ("Waltz for the Defense of Vegetation"), originally written for the Shemer Sisters.

Following a 1968 visit to Nahal settlements in the Israeli-occupied Sinai Peninsula, Shemer wrote the song "BeHe'achzut HaNahal BeSinai" (In the Nahal stronghold in Sinai) for the Nahal Band. The song was performed by Miri Aloni in the band's program BeHichazut HaNahal BaSinai, which aired that year. In 1969, the Central Command Band recorded Shemer's song "Anachnu Shneynu Me'otu HaKfar" ("We Are Both From the Same Village"), which she had written three years earlier. In the same year, she composed the song "Pgisha Le'ein Ketz" ("Endless Meeting") for the band Shlosharim.

For the program of the Israeli Navy Band's 1971 program Shirat HaYam (Song of the Sea), Shemer composed the song "Al Em HaDerech" ("On the Crossroad") for vocalist Chaya Ard. For Chava Alberstein's 1971 program, Shemer wrote the song "Shir Siyum" ("A Finalizing Song"), based on a melody by Manos Hatzidakis. During Hanukkah of that year, Shemer returned to the Sinai Peninsula. Inspired by the visit, she wrote the song "Shvahei Me’oz" ("Praise the Stronghold") for the Southern Command Band. The song's opening was based on "Ma'oz Tzur".

In 1972, the album Chavurat Bimot was released, featuring songs by Shemer such as "Mar Narkis" ("Mr. Narcissus"); "Shir Eres LeMikreim Meyuchadim" ("A Bedtime Song for Special Cases"), a lullaby for children of divorced parents); "Anashim Yafim" ("Beautiful People"), a track about high society; and "HaMakshefot" ("The Witches"), about sensationalist journalism; "Lashir Zeh Kmo Lihiyot Yarden" ("To Sing This is Like Being in the Jordan"), performed by Miri Aloni); "Be'eretz Lahad'am" ("In the Land of Thing-That-Never-Happened"), also performed by Aloni; "Arba'im", and "Ani Megadelat Ba'al". Shemer refrained from including the latter two in her numerous collections over the years.

In the artistic section of the 1972 Melody and Song Festival, HaGashash HaHiver performed Shemer's song "Yesh Li Chag" ("I Have a Holiday"). Another Shemer song published in 1972 was a translation of Jacques Brel's song "L'amour Est Mort" ("Love is Dead"), performed by Yossi Banai.

Shemer continued to adapt popular songs into Hebrew, including "Lu Yehi", an adaptation of the Beatles song "Let It Be", which was written shortly before the Yom Kippur War in 1973 and came to symbolize the conflict. Shemer initially wrote new lyrics to accompany the original Lennon-McCartney music, but was encouraged by her husband Mordechai Horowitz, who had fought in the war, to rewrite it with a "Jewish" melody. Shemer rewrote the melody and it became widely recorded, including by HaGashash HaHiver and Chava Alberstein, who featured it as the title track on one of her albums.

=== 1973–1991 ===
Throughout the 1970s, Shemer continued to compose songs for a variety of artists including Nathan Alterman ("Pgisha Le'ein Ketz", "Sapanei Shalom HaMelech", "Al Em HaDerech", "HaEm HaShlishit"), Shaul Tchernichovsky ("Ba'aliyati Sham Yafati", "Omrim Yeshna Eretz"), Hayim Nahman Bialik ("Kumi Tzei") and Avraham Shlonsky ("Betchul HaShamayim"). She translated songs by Itzik Manger (including "Al HaDerech Etz Omed") and continued writing songs based on texts from various sources (for example, "Shirat Ha'Asavim" was inspired by Nachman of Breslov and "Akedat Yitzhak" by the Book of Genesis).

For Yehoram Gaon's 1973 album Ahava Yam Tikhonit (Mediterranean Love), Shemer composed the song "Kumi Tzei", originally written by Hayim Nahman Bialik.

In 1974, Shemer released an album of children's songs, which included several hits including "Aleph Bet" and "Shlomit Bonah Sukkah", originally performed by Ilana Rovina and Dudaim three years earlier. Most of the record's songs were first performed in a children's show presented by Shemer and Oded Teomi. Also in 1974, Yossi Banai recorded Shemer's song "Sfirat Mlai" ("Cargo Counting") for his solo show Partzuf Shel Tzo'ani (Face of a Gypsy).

In 1976, Shemer wrote the songs for a musical adaptation of The Travels of Benjamin III. Several of the songs gained widespread popularity, including "Perot Chamisha Asar", "Siman She'od Lo Heganu", and "Shirat Ha'asavim" ("The Song of the Grass"). For the "Hebrew Melody Celebration" held that year, Shemer wrote the song "HaChagiga Nigmeret" ("The Celebration Ends"), performed by Hakol Over Habibi. Additionally, in the same year, she wrote the song "Bekol Shana Be'Setav Giora", performed by Ruhama Raz, in memory of Yom Kippur War victim Giora Shoham.

In 1976, Yehoram Gaon recorded Shemer's song "Od Lo Ahavti Dai" ("I Haven't Loved Enough Yet"), which became a major hit. The song was initially written for a television program featuring Shemer's music and was released as the title track of Gaon's album. In a newspaper interview, Shemer revealed that she wrote the song while ill, fearing she might not recover. In a moment of defiance, she remarked, "There are still many things I want to do."

For a 1976 radio program featuring the songs of Shaul Tchernichovsky, Shemer composed the music for Tchernichovsky's poem "Hoy Artzi Moladeti" ("Oh My Country, My Homeland"), which was performed on the program by Shokolad, Menta, Mastik.

Between 1977 and 1979, Shemer published a personal column in Davar titled "Shavshevet" (שבשבת).

In 1978, she wrote the song "Chevlei Mashiach", which she performed herself on a Yom Ha'atzmaut television special.

In 1979, Nurit Galron recorded the song "Atzuv Lamut Be'emtza Hatamuz", written by Shemer. The song was later included in her album Symphatia, released three years later. Also that year, she composed the music for the Avraham Heffner film Parashat Winshel.

For a television program dedicated to Rivka Michaeli in 1980, Shemer wrote the song "Ein Li Rega Dal" which became one of Michaeli's most well-known songs. That year she also wrote the song "Al Kol Eleh" and composed the song "Asif" with lyrics by Itamar Prat for the band Batzal Yarok 80.

In 1981, Shemer released a successful album entitled Al Hadvash Ve'al Ha'Okez (On the Honey and the Sting). The album was named for the opening lyric of "Al Kol Eleh". The album also included the songs "Anashim Tovim" ("Good People") and the Shaul Tchernichovsky track "Omrim Yeshna Eretz", which she composed for the television program Yemei Kislev. In the same year, for the television film El Borot HaMayim, she wrote and recorded a song of the same name.

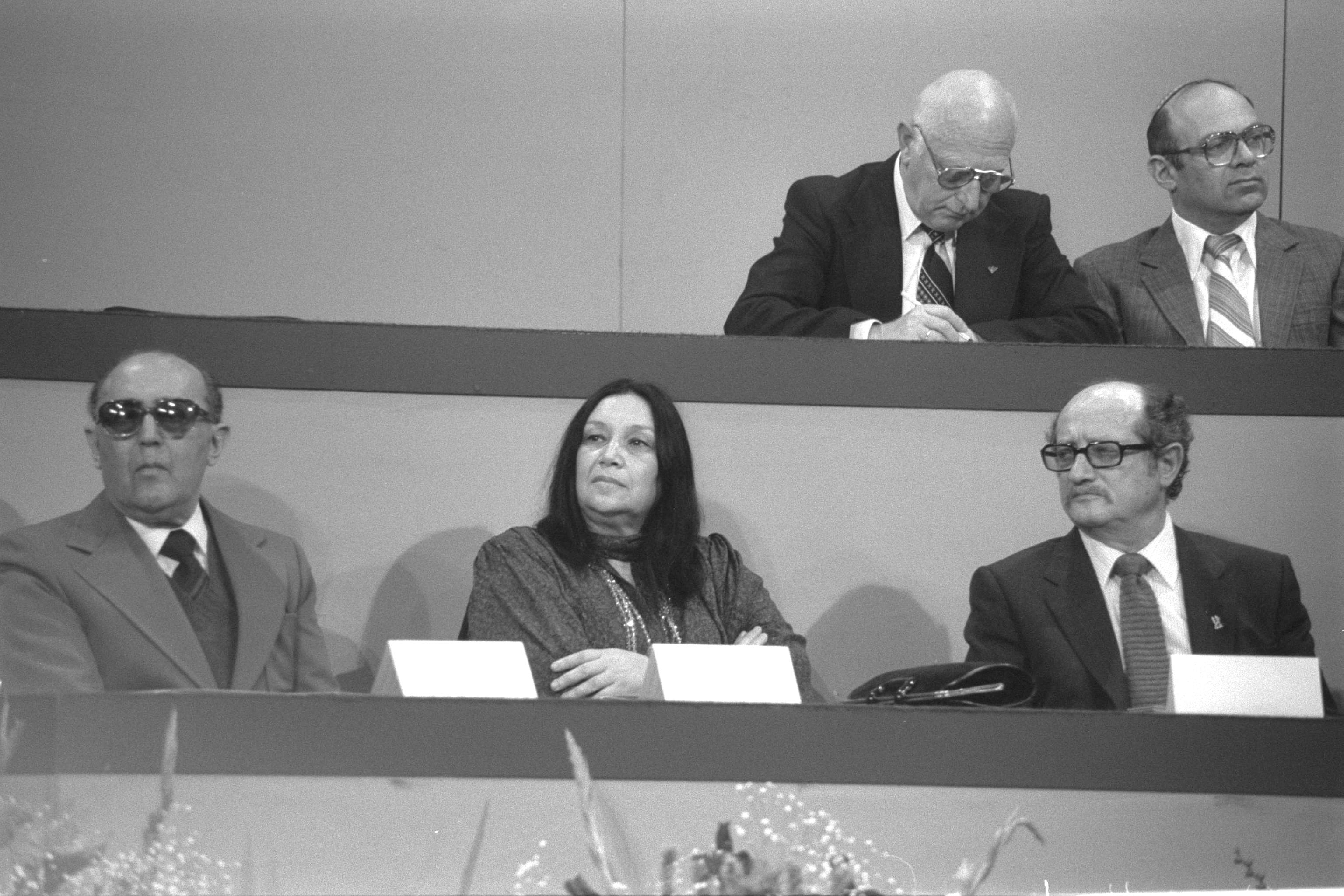
The winners of 1983 Israel Prize. From right to left – Haim Hefer, Shemer, and Moshe Wilensky

In 1983, Shemer won the Jabotinsky Medal and the Israel Prize. The judging committee for the Israeli Prize stated: "The Israel Prize for Music of Israel is awarded to Naomi Shemer for her songs, which naturally find their way into the hearts of all, due to their poetic and musical quality, the wonderful integration between lyrics and melody, and the expression they give to the whispers of the people's hearts." In addition, she was awarded an honorary degree from the Hebrew University of Jerusalem and the Weizmann Institute of Science as well as an honorary citizenship of Tel Aviv-Yafo.

Shemer wrote the title track for Yehoram Gaon's 1982 album Simanei Derekh. In 1984, she penned the song "Lo Tenatzchu Oti" for his album Emtza Haderakh. Also in 1984, she wrote the song "Ha’Ore’ach" ("The Guest") for Hakol Over Chavivi.

From the 1970s onward, as Shemer became more outspokenly right-wing, her songs increasingly featured Jewish and traditional themes. While these themes appeared in earlier works such as Shiro Shel Aba and Lo Amut Ki Ehyeh, they became more prominent in songs like "Shirat Ha’asavim" and "El Borot HaMayim".

By the mid-1980s, Shemer was increasingly viewed by the Israeli public as right-wing, which led some people to hold a negative public image of her, with various public figures and artists sharply criticizing her.

In 1985, Ofra Haza's album Adamah was released. Although the original plan was for Haza and Shemer to collaborate on several songs, the album ultimately featured only one song by Shemer, "Hithadshut". The same year, Shemer wrote the song "Tilbeshi Lavan" for a joint album by the Dudaim and the Parvarim.

For Yehoram Gaon's 1986 album Elef Neshikot, Shemer wrote and composed two songs, "Dyokan Imi" and "Kmo Chatzav". In the same year, her song "Kad HaKemach" was performed by the Northern Command Band.

Starting in the mid-1980s, Shemer's commercial success began to decline. In 1987, Shemer wrote all the songs for Moshe Beker's album Hafatzim Ishiim. While some tracks, like "Guy" and "Tut", received considerable radio play, the album's sales were disappointing. Shemer attributed the album's lack of success to her association with right-wing politics.

In 1988, Shemer wrote the song "Or" for Shoshana Damari. Featured on Damari's album of the same name, the song was a huge success, helping to bring Damari back into the spotlight and becoming a popular dance hit.

=== Final years ===
In 1991, after rumors circulated that Shemer was seriously ill, a tribute event titled Encore to Naomi Shemer was broadcast on Israel's Channel 1, produced by Dalia Gutman. The evening featured performances by numerous artists, including Chava Alberstein, Nurit Galron, Yehudit Ravitz, and Moti Kirschenbaum. One of the standout moments was the performance of "Serenada Lach" by Gidi Gov, Moni Moshonov, and Shlomo Baraba, arranged by Yoni Rechter. It was later revealed that Shemer's illness was not as severe as initially thought, and fears about her death were unfounded.

In her final years, Shemer's commercial successes were infrequent and sporadic. One exception was the song "Hakol Patuah", written in celebration of the Sea of Galilee. In 1993, Shemer appeared alongside Mickey Kam, Moshe Beker, Chaim Tzinoivitz, and Rina Givon in the children's video cassette Etzelnu BaPsanter, which was based on her songs. In the video, Shemer performed "Hakol Patuah" with the other participants. A year later, a recording of the song by Leah Lupatin and Ofer Levi became a hit. Shemer later expressed regret that the recording was done without her knowledge.

In October 1993, for a tribute program on Channel 1 honoring singer Beni Amdursky, Shemer wrote the song "Ani Guitara". The program was filmed while Amdursky was dying of cancer. After he completed his rendition of the song, Amdursky thanked Shemer for the song, and she struggled to hide her deep emotional reaction.

In 1995, following the assassination of Yitzhak Rabin, Shemer translated Walt Whitman’s poem "O Captain! My Captain!"—written in memory of Abraham Lincoln after his assassination 130 years earlier—to Hebrew and composed music for it. Shemer's adaptation was performed for the first time by singer Meytal Trabelsi during a commemoration of Rabin's assassination.

A tribute evening in Shemer's honor was held at the 1998 Israel Festival, directed by Adi Renart and featuring numerous artists.

From 2000 until her death, Shemer performed in a show of her songs titled Elef Shirim veShir, with arrangements, accompaniment, and musical direction by Rami Harel. She co-directed the show with producer and presenter Dudu Elharar, and it featured the singing and playing of Ronit Roland. For the production, Shemer wrote the songs "HaMe’il", "Plugat Yasmin", "HaMenagen", and "Aktualia".

== Death and legacy ==
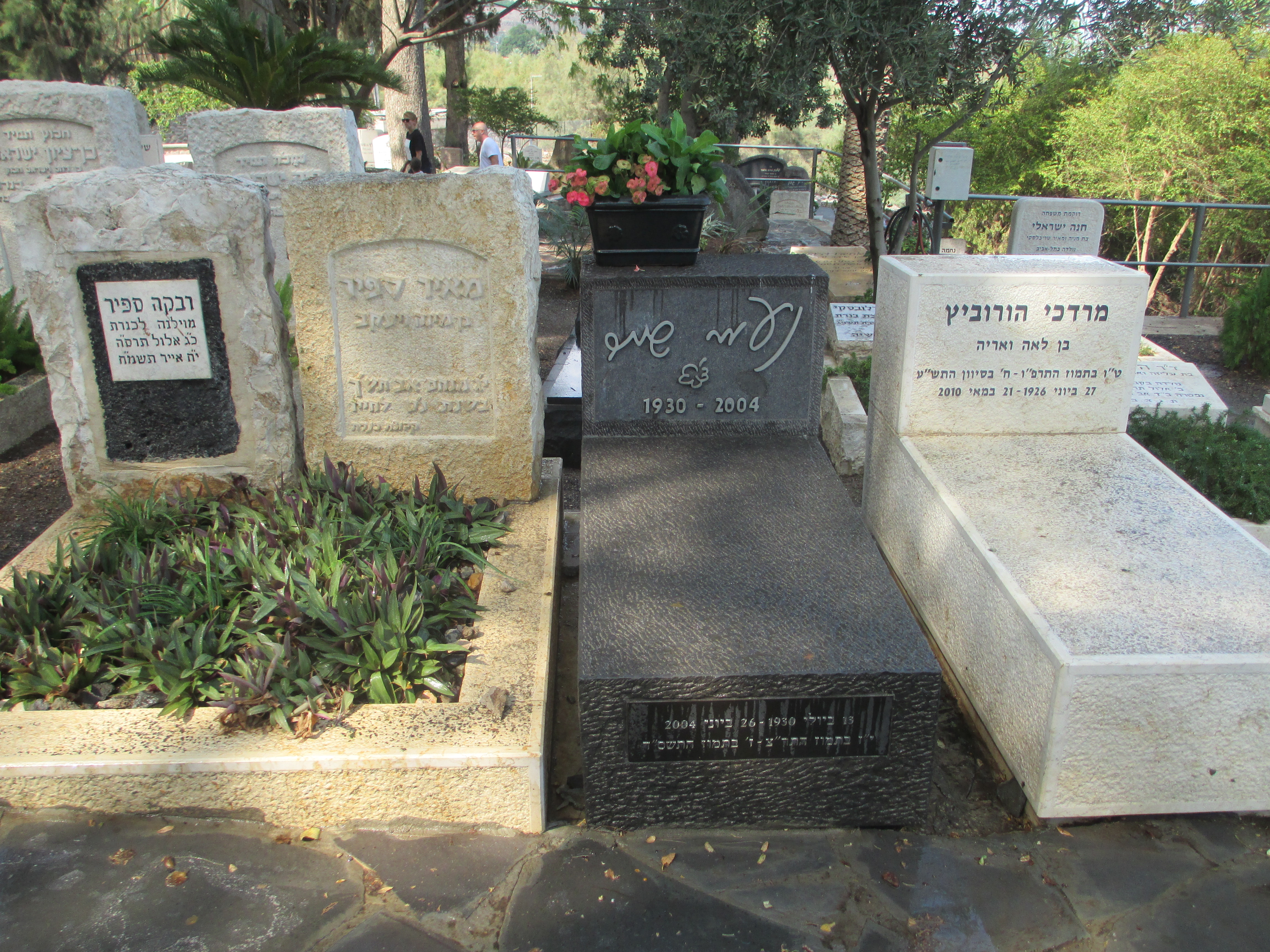
Four adjacent graves in the Kinneret Cemetery: Mordechai Horowitz (Shemer's second husband who died in 2010), Shemer, Shemer's parents Meir and Rivka Sapir

Shemer struggled with health issues throughout her life, including being diagnosed with diabetes in the 1970s. She died of cancer on June 26, 2004, the 9th of the Jewish month of Tammuz. Years before her death, Shemer wrote the song "Sad to Die in the Middle of Tammuz" before undergoing necessary surgery.

Shemer was buried in Kinneret Cemetery alongside her parents. At Shemer's request, Dudu Elharar sang four songs written by her at her funeral: "Kinneret" ("Sham Harei Golan" by Rachel Bluwstein), "Hurshat HaEcalyptus", "Lashir Zeh Kmo Lihiyot Yarden", and "Noa".

Shortly before her death, Shemer informed producer Dorit Reuveni that she had written a new song titled "Ilan", in memory of Ilan Ramon. Reuveni met with Shemer and recorded her playing the song. It was first performed during a tribute show for Shemer, held in Yarkon Park thirty days after her death.

After Shemer's death, several previously unreleased songs were made public. Ariel Zilber recorded "Hakarish" for his album Anabel. Ruhama Raz and the band Parvarim made recordings of "Arvei Nahal", an English folk song that Shemer had translated. In 2020, Shemer's song "Farewell" was composed for the first time by Rami Kleinstein and released as a duet performed by Kleinstein and Tal Sondak as part of Sondak's album Shiratam.

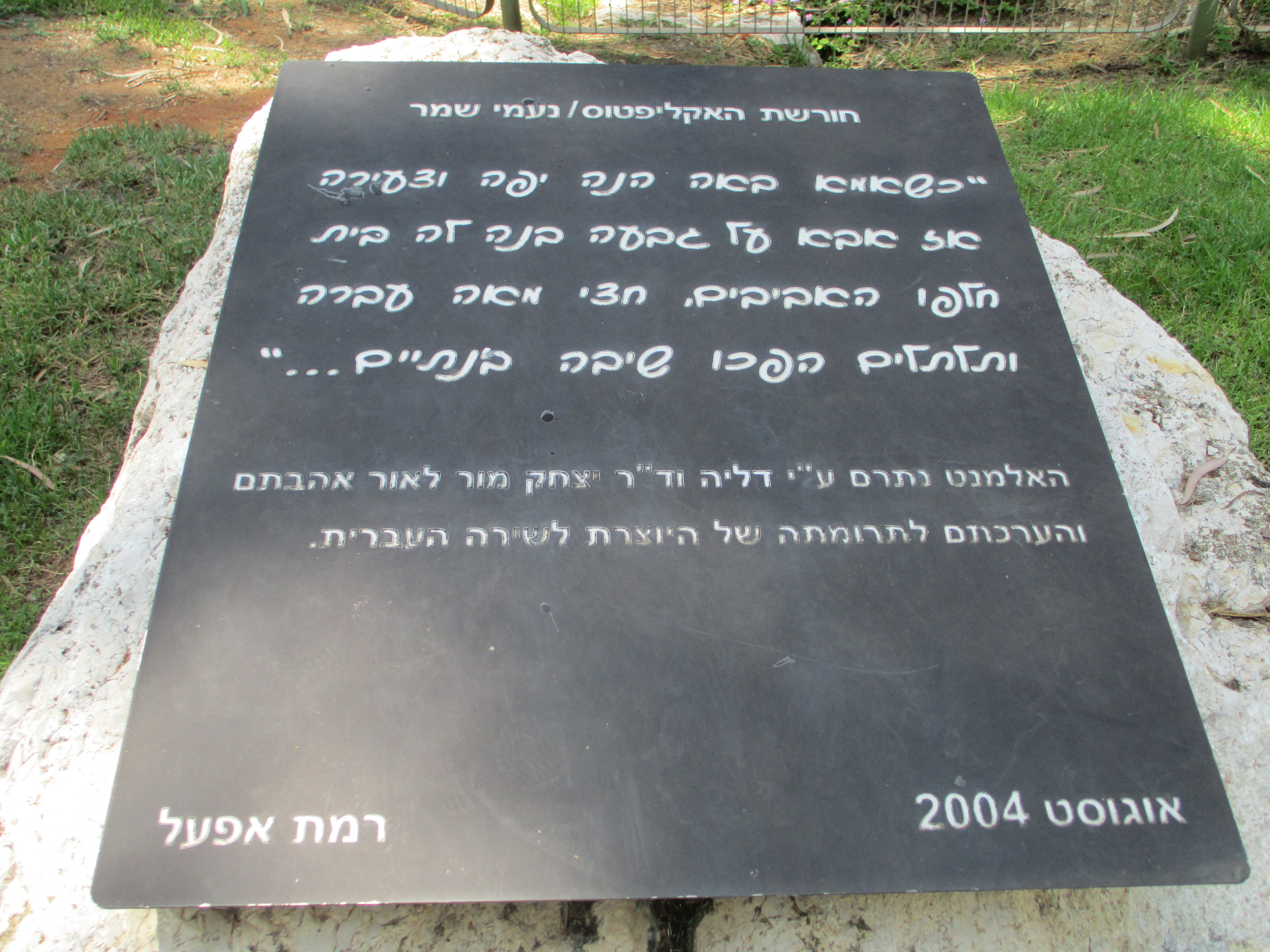
A tribute to Shemer in the Eucalyptus Grove in Ramat Efal

Streets have been named after Shemer in several cities, including Kiryat Motzkin, Herzliya, Holon, Giv'at Shmuel, Be'er Ya'akov, Kiryat Bialik, Kfar Saba, and Be'er Sheva, as well as elementary schools.

In 2005, the Israel Government Coins and Medals Corporation issued silver and gold coins with her likeness.

On April 22 2009, the Israeli Stamp Service issued a series of 12 postal stamps on the subject of Israeli music. One of the stamps in this collection was dedicated in memory of Shemer. The stamp, with a portrait of Shemer, was designed by the artist Miri Nestor Sofer. The stamp's tab included a line from Shemer's song "Yeurshalim, Shel Zahav" (Jerusalem of Gold) - "Jerusalem of gold and of copper and light".

In 2010, Shemer's family handed over her archive and artistic legacy to the National Library of Israel, which committed to making it accessible.

In 2011, a 650 m-long tunnel in Jerusalem from Mount Scopus to the Jordan Valley was renamed to honor her as Naomi Shemer Tunnel.

In 2012, Yahaly Gat’s film The Wind, the Darkness, the Water aired on Channel 1. The film explores Shemer’s works and their impact on Israeli society and culture.

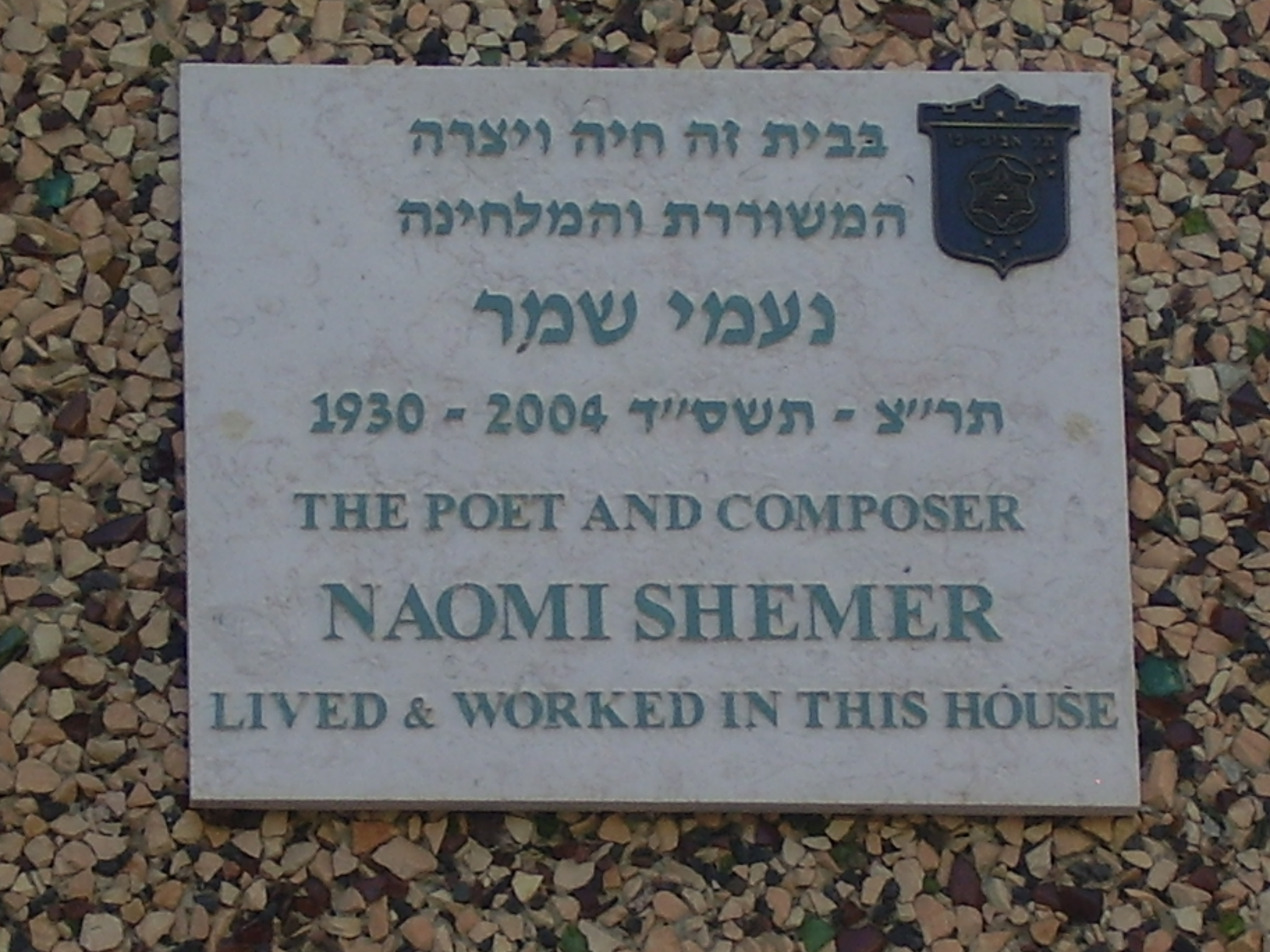
Memorial plaque to Shemer on her house in Tel Aviv-Yafo

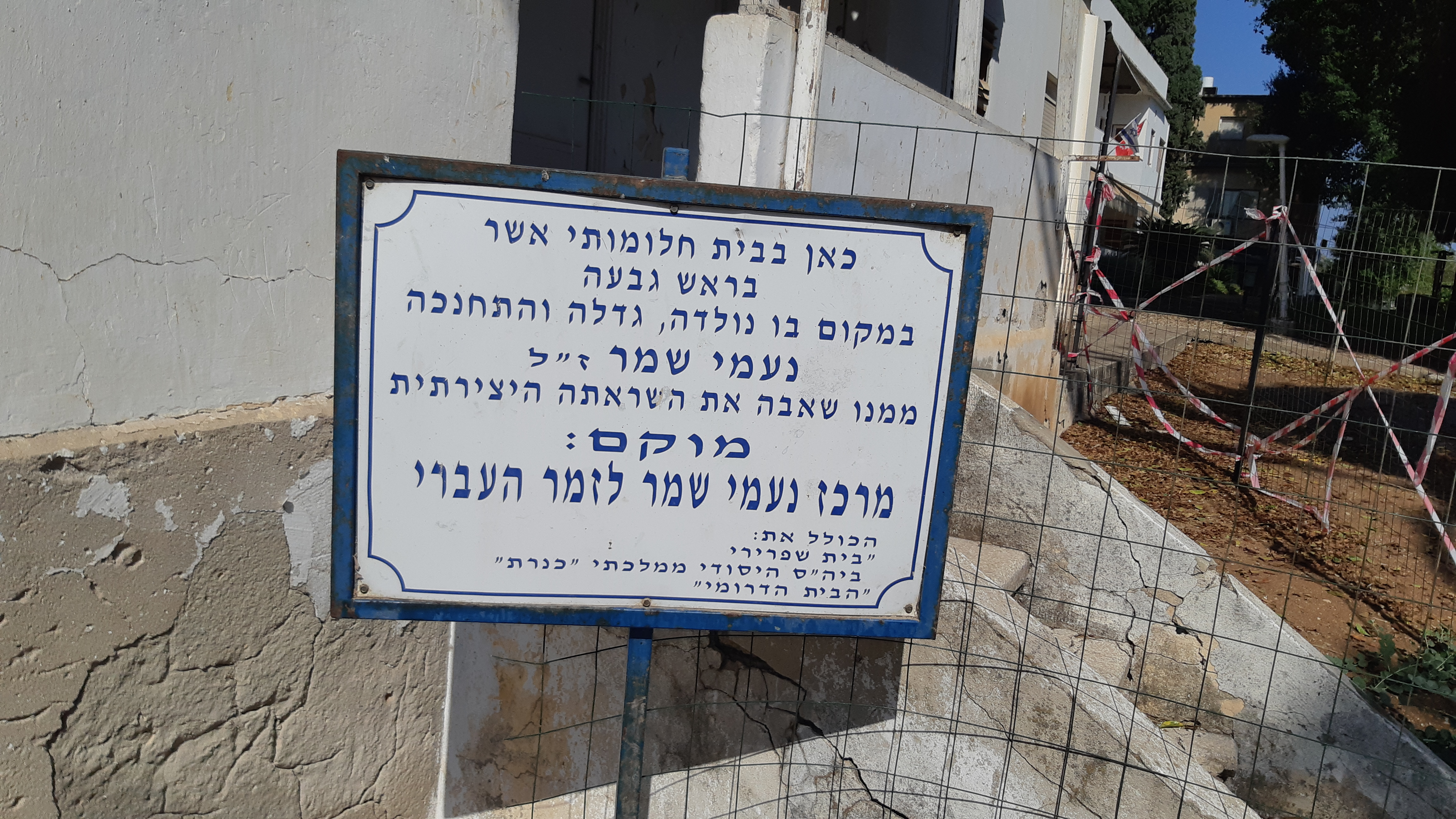
Naomi Shemer center for Hebrew poetry

In 2017, the musical Simanei Derekh (Signs of the Way) by Oren Yakobi and Giora Yahalom was staged at the Habima Theatre. The production tells the story of Shemer's life.

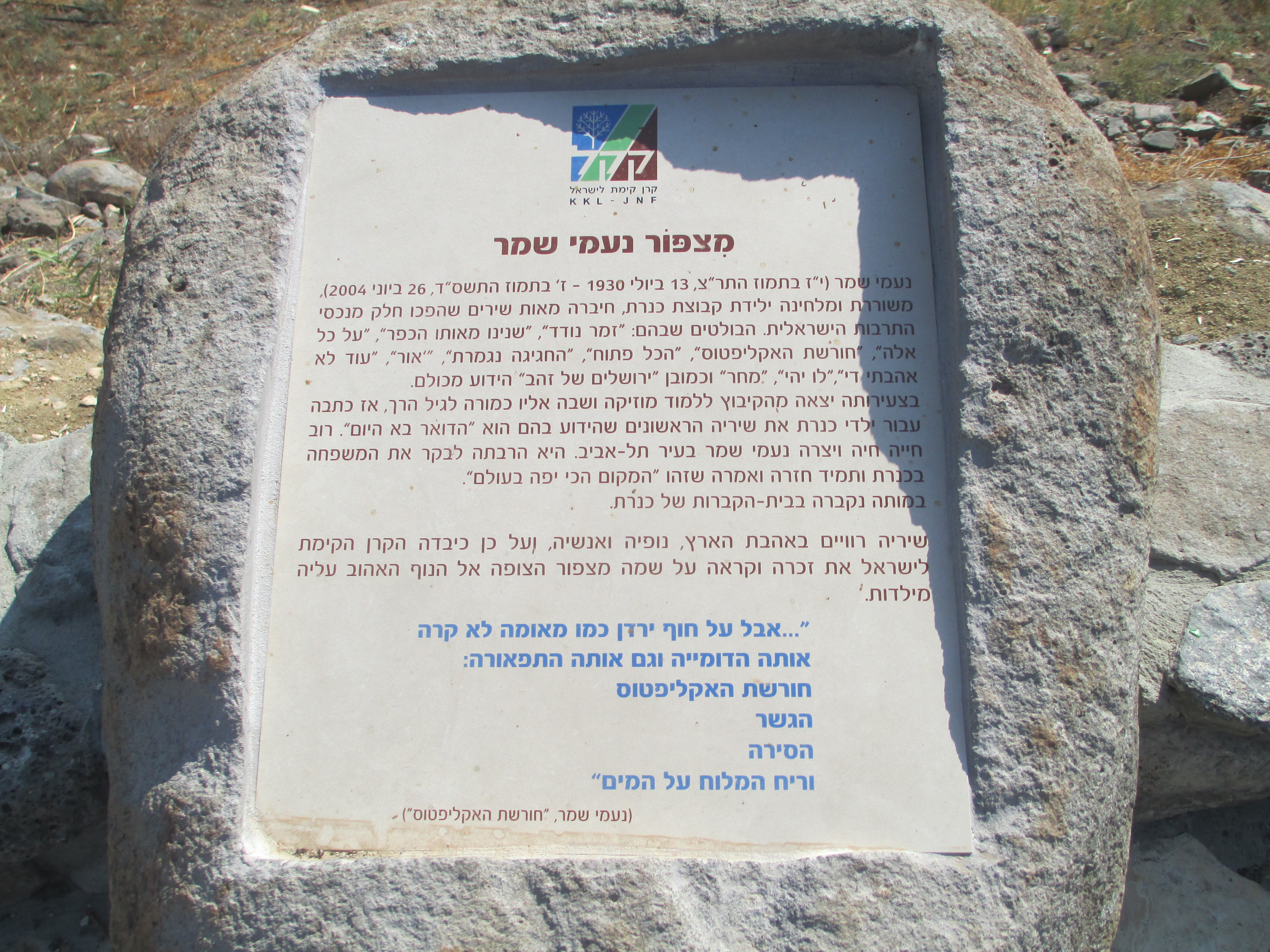
Monument at the Naomi Shemer viewpoint in Ein Gev

In 2021, the "Naomi Shemer Trail" was inaugurated in Ramat Gan National Park, with musical stations and explanations about the songs.

In June 2021, the production of the new song "Hagvira Mul HaAgam" ("The Lady by the Lake"), written by Yair Lapid, was completed. The song, inspired by Shemer's life, was created to celebrate her 90th birthday. Composed by Kobi Oshrat, it was performed by Miki Gavrielov and Yigal Bashan.

In June 2022, the cast of Zehu Ze! recorded "Naomi, Ela Mi", a song dedicated to Shemer, written and composed by Kobi Luria, in commemoration of the 18th anniversary of her death.

== Personal life ==
In 1953, Shemer (then known as Naomi Sapir) met actor Gideon Shemer at a Kibbutz Movement event in Netzer Sereni. They married in 1954 and had a daughter, Lali. The Shemers separated in 1962 and divorced in 1968. In 1969, she married Mordechai Horowitz, a lawyer. Their son is musician Ariel Horowitz.

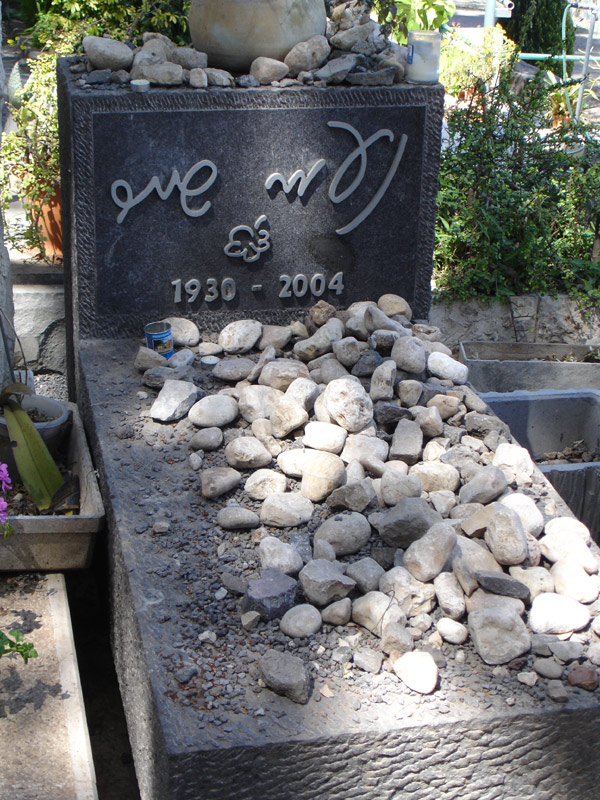
Shemer's grave

Shemer was buried at the cemetery in Kvutzat Kinneret, alongside several Labor Zionist settlers from the second and third aliyot. In accordance with her wishes, Shemer was buried near Rachel Bluwstein.

== Political views ==
Shemer was associated with right-wing and pro-Israeli settlement politics, especially after her marriage to Mordechai Horowitz, who had similar beliefs.

Some critics argue that "Jerusalem of Gold" erases the presence of the Palestinians who lived in East Jerusalem at the time it was written. Shemer responded to this over the years: "A world that is devoid of Jews, for me, is like a dead star, and the Land of Israel, which is empty of Jews, is for me desolate and empty".

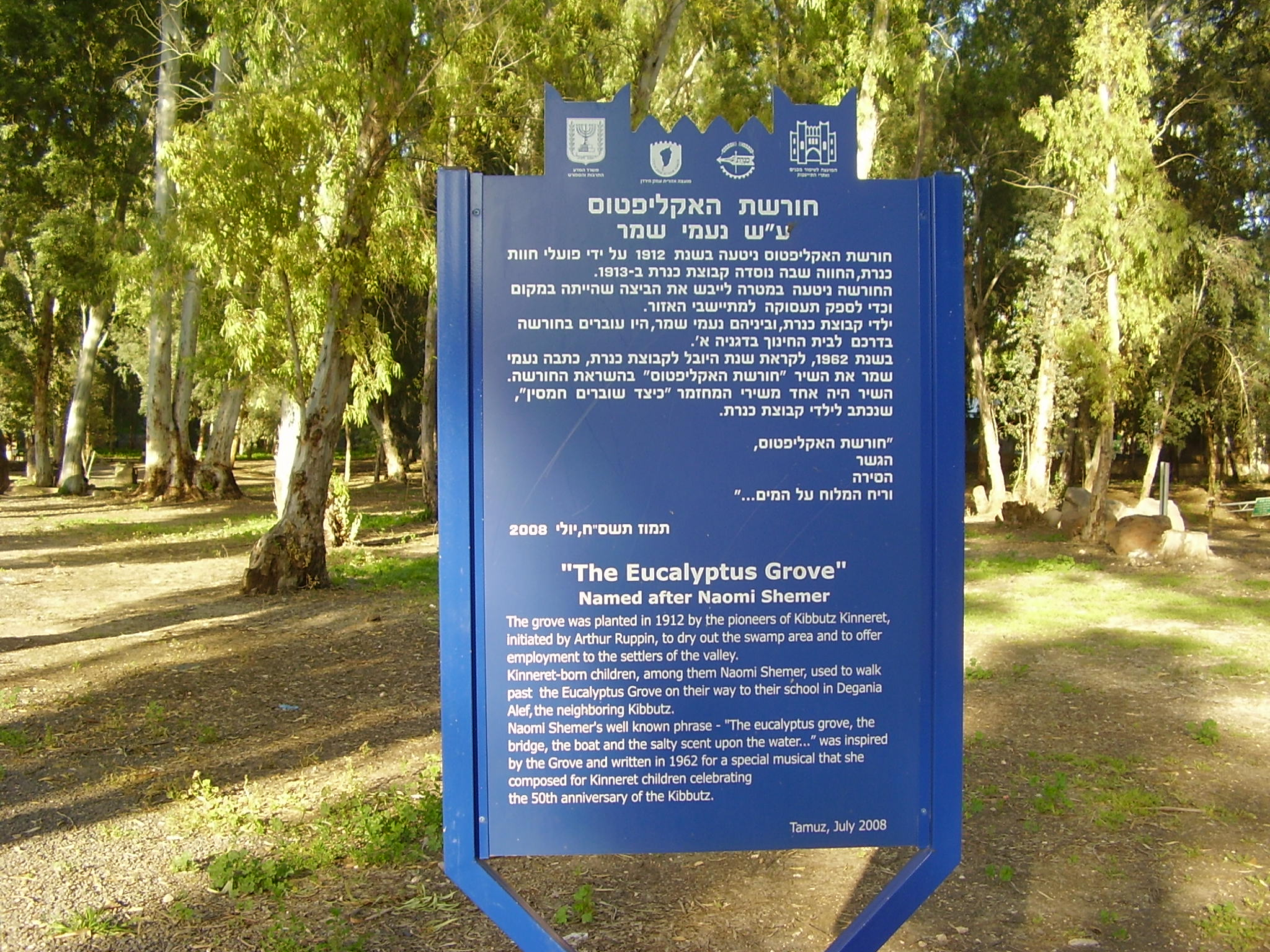
Eucalyptus grove named after the poet Naomi Shemer, near Kibbutz Kinneret

In the mid-1970s, Shemer expressed solidarity with the Gush Emunim movement. She wrote A Strange Man, which she read at a Gush Emunim assembly to Sebastia, and Paranoid, expressing support for the organization's members. Shemer's 1975 song The Shark criticized the Sinai Interim Agreement. These songs ignited public debate and received little radio airplay amidst criticism.

In July 1976, Shemer published a response to her critics claiming she was not affiliated with any political party or movement advocating for a Greater Israel. She emphasized her belief in "the justice of Zionism".

During Israel's withdrawal from the Sinai Peninsula, Shemer expressed support for the Israeli settlers in Yamit. Her song Al Kol Eleh, which includes the line 'Al na ta'akor netu'a' (Please do not uproot the planted), became a symbol of the opposition to the withdrawal, although Shemer claimed it was originally written as a personal message of comfort for her sister, Ruth Novasbaum, after the death of her husband. Some claim that the lesser-known verses of the song make it evident that the song was intended to be against the withdrawal from Sinai. After the evacuation of Yamit, realizing she could no longer have an impact, Shemer refrained from further involvement in public affairs.

== Awards ==
In 1983, Shemer received the Israel Prize for Hebrew song (words and melody).

== Works ==
- All My Songs (Almost), 1967, published by Yedioth Ahronoth

"Tomorrow"	"On The Jordan"	"The White Town"
"A Chariot of Fire"	"Lights Out"	"Black Coffee"
"My Soldier is Back"	"Fields at Sunset"	"Green Meadows"
"Four Brothers"	"Soldiers En Route"	"A Song For Gideon"
"The Long Hike"	"The Builders' Love"	"Yesternight"
"Look For Me"	"Men At Work!"	"The Two of Us"
"We Are Starving!"	"In Such a Night"	"A Lament"
"An Umbrella For Two"	"The Clown"	"Just For You"
"My Dream House"	"Ophelia"	"Night on the Shore"
"Anniversary Song"	"The Spy-Girl"	"Answers"
"My Flute"	"A Serenade"	"A City in Grey"
"Twelve Months"	"Flowers, Herbs, Etc."	"Jerusalem of Gold"
"A Short Walk"	"The Market Song"	"On Silver Wings"
"My Fathers Song"	"Night on the Park"	"Lullaby for Colors"

- The Second Book, copyright 1975, published by Lulav

Land of Lahadam	Funny Faces	For Children
"Land of Lahadam"	"Beautiful People"	"Rosh-Hashana"
"Nachal in Sinai"	"Sixteen"	"Shlomit"
"Maoz Tsur"	"Mr. Narcissus"	"Aleph-Beit"
"The Sacrifice of Isaac"	"The Witches"	"When Adar Comes"
"Giora"	"A Special Lullaby"	"Let's Say"
"All We Pray For"	"Shem, Cham, & Yefet"	"I Have a Friend"
"A Song is Born"	"The Shark"	"On the Move"
"Things we Have"	"Paranoid"	"Summer Holiday"
"Bethlehem"	"Two Street-Photographers"	"Tall Stories"
"Why Did Michal Laugh"		"How to Break a Chamsin"
"Ruchama"
"Yesh Li Chag"
"It's Late"
"Shalom Kitah Aleph"
"To Sing Like a Jordan"

- Number Three (Sefer Gimel), copyright 1982, published by Lulav

Songs	Poems	Imported Wine	Children Everywhere	Columns from Davar
"Al Kol Eleh"	"Omrim Yeshna Eretz"	"Oifen Veg Stait a Bhoim"	"Children Everywhere"	"Shalom, Ida Nudel"
"Good People"	"Hoi Artzi Moladti"	"Si Tous les Oiseaux"	"Grapefruit"	"Pardes-Hanna"
"Shirat Ha'Asavim"	"Come & Sing"	"Le Testament"	"Autumn"	"It's Raining"
"Cheveley Mashiach"	"Kinneret"	"La Non-Demande en Mariage"	"Our Benjamin"	"Yehuda"
"Tapuach Bi'Dvash"	"Begani"	"Il n'y a pas d'Amour Heureux"	"The Piano"	"Vintage Days"
"New Babylon"	"Zemer"	"Un Amour de Vingt Ans"
"Yif'at"	"Metai"	"Les Souliers"
"Tammuz"	"Rachel"	"O Imitoos"
"Spring Parade"	"Ki Sa'art Alai"	"Sur le Chemin du Retour"
"The Eighth Day"	"The Third Mother"	"Barbara"
"Summer"	"Your Lily-White Feet"	"Dedication"
"Noa"	"A Lament"
"Zamar Noded"	"My Sudden Death"
"Landmarks"	"Let's go to the Field"
"My Town in the Snow"
"Lots of Love" – Ain Mashehu cmo zeh
"The Party is Over"
"Ein Davar"
"El Borot Ha'Mayim"

- Book Four (Sefer Arbah), copyright 1995, published by Shva Publishers

Uncategorized	6 Songs for Yehoram Gaon	11 Personal Belongings for Moshe Beker	5 Songs for Rivka Michaeli	Hebrew Versions	6 Children Songs	Lyrics for Mattai Caspi's Music
"Light"	"Kemo Katsav"	"Personal Belongings"	"Street Musicians"	"Musica"	"Chanuka"	"Shulamit"
"The Guest"	"You Can't Beat Me"	"Swan Girl"	"Global Patrol"	"Willow Songs"	"Tu Bishvat"	"Simchati"
"We Aren't There Yet"	"You're the Best"	"Old Flame"	"Not Bialik"	"Ne Me Quitte Pas"	"Pesach"	"Farewll"
"Ir Va'Em"	"Good Morning"	"Flower"	"Never a Dull Moment"		"One Little Kid"
"My Mother's Portrait"	"Libavtini"	"Prelude"	"Upside Down"
"Noga"	"Black Princess"	"Sister"
"The Bread of Love"		"Roof"
"After the Harvest"		"Gai"
"Summer White"		"Strawberry"
"The Flour Jar"		"Time"
"Pardes-Chana II"		"September First"
"I'm a Guitar"
"To Light a Candle"
"Your Sons From Afar"
"Hal'ah"
"Safed"
"On the Boardwalk"
"Shana Tova"
"It's All Open"
"Cafe Tiferet"
"My Young Disaster"
"Dancing"

== See also ==
- Ada Aharoni
- Karen Alkalay-Gut
- Raquel Chalfi
- Hava Pinchas-Cohen
- Janice Rebibo
- Yona Wallach
- Zelda (poet)
- List of Israel Prize recipients
