= Ofer Levi =

Israeli singer

Ofer Levi עופר לוי
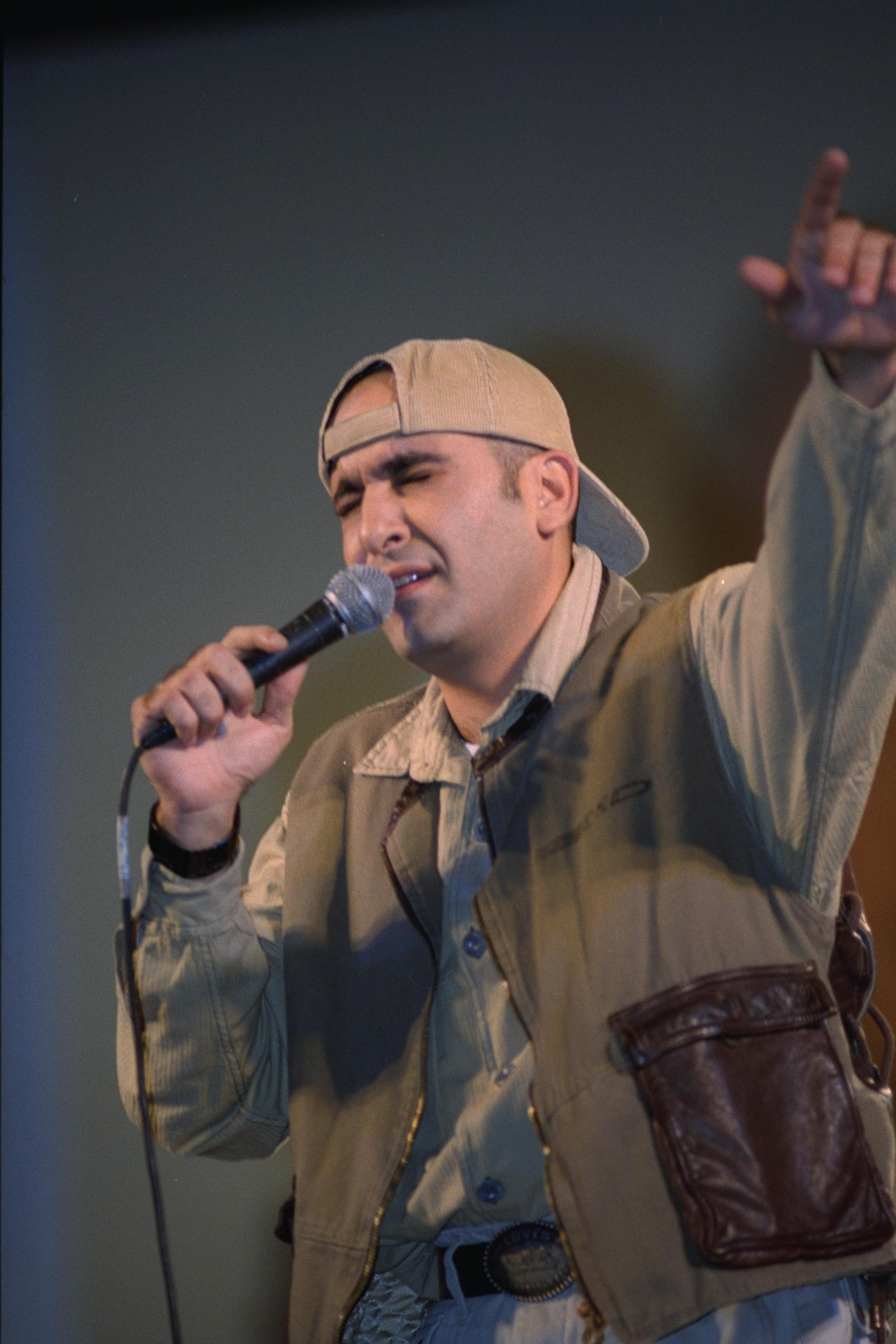

Background information
- Born: June 17, 1964; Kiryat Ata, Israel
- Genres: Mizrahi music, Arabic music, Turkish Music, Israeli Music
- Relatives: Lihi Toledano (niece)

Ofer Yoel Levy (Hebrew: עופר לוי; born June 17, 1964) is an Israeli singer and composer, a pioneer of the Turkish and Arab music genres in Israel.

== Biography ==
Levy was born and raised in Kiryat Ata to Hannah and Mordechai, the seventh child out of nine children. He first started singing on stage and in front of an audience at the age of 5 and a half. At the age of 6 he sang the Arabic song "Bahia" by Muhammad al-Azbiat an Egyptian singer at a family event, at the time. At the age of 12 he left his parents house and moved to Kibbutz Eilon, but after a few years he left the kibbutz and returned to his parents' house to help his father, who had financial difficulties. His sister, Hagit, was married to Israeli singer Avi Toledano.

At the age of 17, Levy had a car accident in which he lost his brother Yitzhak. The brothers returned from a night out in the Haifa area, and during the trip they slipped into an abyss. In 1982, Levy enlisted in the Golani Brigade as a magistrate, fighting in the 1982 War in Lebanon. In an interview in 2025, he confessed to physically abusing and executing prisoners of war, stating: "I was violent towards the terrorists. It wasn't just tying them up, it was kicking, slamming the gunstock against their heads, wounding them to oblivion [...] [they] remained alive? Not with me".

== Music career ==
Levy auditioned for a military band but was disqualified for choosing to sing in Arabic. After his release from the army, he began performing in clubs in Haifa under the name Ferdi as a tribute to the Turkish singer Ferdi Tayfur. In 1988 he released his first album "Ha'Kalfan", which was a success among Turkish and Arabic music lovers. Yaakov Lamai arranged the songs for the album. In January 1990, the album "Tefilat Adam" was released, a live album recorded during his performance in Turkey.

In May 1990, shortly after the release of the live album, the album "Lo Yachol Bil'adea" was released, which was a success among oriental music lovers. The songs on the album include "Ah'avat Emet", "Rotze Bach", "Sawah" (an Arabic song, originally by Abdel-Halim Hafez).

In 1991, the album "Kochav Shnot Ha'tishim" was released, which became a bestseller. 3 songs from the album became huge hits: "Yom Ha'ravakim", "Hachziri li et bni" and "Maa'yan Ha'neurim".

In January 1992, the album "Nistarot Darchei Ha'el" was released. The songs on the album were arranged by Momin Sessler and Eli Orlo (two producers and musicians who came to Israel from Turkey).

Released in 1993, the album Ohev Lihyot featured passionate vocals underscored by rifling percussion, jagged synth lines and swirling flute melodies. It included the song "Meohav Ba'geshem", a Hebrew version of a Spanish song by Julio Iglesias) "I have no day I have no night" (lyrics: Dudu Barak), "What is love", "A seductive way", "Forever to love", "Looking for my son" (a sequel to "Give me back my son") and more. The album was a great success.

In 1994, with Lea Lupatin, he performed Naomi Shemer's song "Hakol Patuach", which became a huge hit, and also performed with Lupatin "At Lee Or" (a song written and composed by Yoni Roe). Following the joint success of the two, Levy, in collaboration with Lupatin, released the album Ha'eretz Ha'muvtachat, meaning "The Promised Land" in 1995, which includes Mediterranean covers to Israeli classics. He also appeared with the album's theme song at the pre-Eurovision contest in March of that year.

At the end of 1995, Levy became an Ultra-Orthodox Jew. A year later, he released a live performance album, which was recorded during Levy's performance at the Netanya auditorium and the performance was also broadcast live on Galei Tzahal radio. In fact, this is the last album that Levy released before he became an Ultra-Orthodox, and also included a renewal of the Arabic song "Benadi Elik".

In 1997 the album Tzipor Shemesh was released. The theme song was dedicated to Levi's eldest daughter - Tzipora, who was born shortly before. Another song dealt with his return to repentance, and love songs. This album features a large number of musicians.

In 2002, an album with religious content Shema Beni Mussar Avicha was released. This album is based on the well-known melodies from his songs, but changing the lyrics to ones "with content of God's love".

From 1997 to mid- 2002, Levy appeared mainly at conferences organized by the "Values" organization, the purpose of which is to repent.

In 2005 the album Metzayer Otach was released. Among the songwriters on the album were David Sigman, Arkadi Duchin, Yossi Gispen and the Naar'ey Raful band (Itai Zilberstein and Meir Amar). Yaakov Lamai and Shai Reuveni produced the album.

In 2008, a double live album was released, The Performance, recorded at Hangar 11 in Tel Aviv in honor of the 60th Independence Day. This performance includes the songs from the album Draws You as well as his old songs. He then released a single from his next album: The Prayer of a Child which was for a few weeks in the first places in the downloads charts for cell phones.

In 2009 he toured Heichal HaTarbut, Binyanei HaUma and around the country and also renewed Yehoram Gaon's song "Efo At Ahuva".

In 2010 he released his album BaDerech Shebacharti.

In 2011, his cover for Shlomo Artzi's song "Gever Olech LeIbud" was released.

In 2012, a duet with Eyal Golan "Ratzti Aharaich" was released, which was well received.

In October 2013, he released the duet "Ba Li Lashir" - "I want to sing" together with opera singer Efrat Rotem. The song was written by Hamutal Ben-Ze'ev Efron, composed and arranged by Yaron Bachar and Ofer Levy.

On April 1, 2014, Ofer Levy released his 17th album, HaIsha Shel Haiay - The Woman of My Life.

On March 24, 2015, Levy released his 18th album, Libi Shelach, which included. He went on a joint tour with Yishai Levy this year.

In 2015, he served as a guest judge on Channel 20's paytans (piyyut singers) reality show.

In March 2018 he released a remake of Avraham Fried's song "Ale Katan Sheli".

In July 2018 he released a remake of the song "Manuel", originally performed by Greek singer Glykeria in the mid-90s.

In September 2019 he released the song "Sof HaYom" - a lullaby of a father to his son. The song was written by Ephraim Butchuk, composed by Avi Ben David, arranged and musically produced by Yaron Bachar.

== Controversy ==
In 1997 he was convicted of tax offenses and sentenced to 8 months probation and a fine. In 2007, a stun grenade was thrown at the door of his house in Moshav Yad Rambam.

== Politics ==
In 2025, Levi made public statements calling for the ethnic cleansing of Gaza and execution of prisoners of war. In an interview published on Maariv he said: "If I was an IDF soldiers now, there would be no prisoners. [...] I would kill them all, and burn them [...] We should [...] destroy first [...]. Erase Gaza completely, totally. Not flatten it, burn it".

== See also ==
- Music of Israel
