= Rokdim Im Kokhavim season 7 =

Rokdim Im Kokhavim
- Season 7
- No. of episodes: 10

Release
- Original network: Channel 2
- Original release: May 3, 2012 – present

Season chronology
- ← Previous; Season 6 Next → Season 8

Rokdim Im Kokhavim 7 is the 7th season of the popular reality TV show Rokdim Im Kokhavim. It is hosted by Guy Zu-Aretz and Yarden Harel with judges Eli Mizrahi and the Newest Uri Paster and Michal Amdurski.

== Couples ==
Celebrity	Professional	Position
Gil Mossinson (basketball player)	Anastasia Shapiro	1st Eliminated
Shlomo Baraba (actor, comedian)	Polina Chiktonov	2nd Eliminated
Dana Adini (actress, singer)	Anton Lapidos	3rd Eliminated
Noa Mayman (director, actress)	Danny Yochtman	4th Eliminated
Avihu Shabat (singer)	Elina Shoostin	5th Eliminated
Ilanit (singer)	Haim Pershtein	Withdrew
Shlomi Lahiani (mayor of Bat Yam)	Rina Greenspan	6th Eliminated
Orna Datz (singer)	Yaniv Kakon	7th/8th Eliminated
Yuval Shem Tov (children star)	Viki Shupletsov	7th/8th Eliminated
Esti Zakhaim (actress)	Boris Zaltzman	9th Eliminated
Amit Farkash (actress)	Oron Dahan	Third
Miki Geva (comedian)	Yulya Prokofenko	Second
Asaf Hertz (actor)	Masha Troyansky	Winners

== Scores ==
Couple	Place	1	2	3	4	5A	5B	6	7	8	9
Asaf & Masha	1	21	22	20	23	25+5=30	—	W	29+23=52	30+23=53	29+28=57
Miki & Yulia	2	15	19	19	22	22+0=22	—	L+22	27+27=54	25+24=49	27+29=56
Amit & Oron	3	18	19	15	16	—	23+0=23	W	24+27=51	25+28=53	24
Esti & Boris	4	18	22	22	17	—	18+0=18	W	24+27=51	23+26=49	
Orna & Yaniv	5	19	19	21	22	—	20+5=25	W	22+23=45		
Yuval & Viki	5	19	19	21	21	—	22+5=27	L+26	23+23=46		
Shlomi & Rina	7	15	19	16	19	19+0=19	—	L+21			
Ilanit & Haim	8	17	20	22	20	23+5=28	—	WD			
Avihu & Elina	9	19	20	22	20	—	24+5=29				
Noaa & Dani	10	17	19	20	18	19+5=24					
Dana & Anton	11	19	19	21	18						
Shlomo & Polina	12	19	20	19							
Gili & Anastasia	13	18	16								

Red numbers indicate the lowest score for each week.
Green numbers indicate the highest score for each week.
W indicates the winners of dance duels in Week 6.
L indicates the losers of dance duels in Week 6.
indicates the couple eliminated that week.
indicates the returning couple that finished in the bottom two.
indicates the winning couple.
indicates the runner-up couple.
indicates the third-place couple.
indicates the couple that withdrew from the competition.

== Averages ==
This table only counts for dances scored on a traditional 30-points scale (the scores for the Hustle group dance in Week 5 are not included).

Rank by average	Place	Couple	Total points	Number of dances	Average
1	1	Asaf & Masha	273	11	24.82
2	2	Miki & Yulia	278	12	23.17
3	3	Amit & Oron	219	10	21.9
4	4	Esti & Boris	197	9	21.89
5	5	Yuval & Viki	174	8	21.75
6	9	Avihu & Alina	105	5	21.0
7	5	Orna & Yaniv	146	7	20.86
8	8	Ilanit & Haim	102	5	20.4
9	12	Shlomo & Polina	58	3	19.33
10	11	Dana & Anton	77	4	19.25
11	10	Noa & Dani	93	5	18.6
12	7	Shlomi & Rina	109	6	18.17
13	13	Gili & Anastasia	34	2	17.0

== Couples' highest and lowest scoring dances ==
According to the traditional 30-point scale:

Couple	Highest Scoring Dance(s)	Lowest Scoring Dance(s)
Asaf & Masha	Viennese Waltz (30)	Rumba (20)
Miki & Yulia	Freestyle (29)	Waltz (15)
Amit & Oron	Jive (28)	Paso Doble (15)
Esti & Boris	Samba (27) Group score Jive (26) Individual score	Rumba (17)
Orna & Yaniv	Samba (23) Group score Rumba & Cha-cha-cha (22) Individual score	Waltz & Salsa (19)
Yuval & Viki	Viennese Waltz (26)	Waltz & Rumba (19)
Shlomi & Rina	Salsa (21)	Cha-cha-cha (15)
Ilanit & Haim	Quickstep (23)	Cha-cha-cha (17)
Avihu & Alina	Quickstep (24)	Cha-cha-cha (19)
Noa & Dani	Tango (20)	Waltz (17)
Dana & Anton	Jive (21)	Rumba (18)
Shlomo & Polina	Quickstep (20)	Cha-cha-cha & Viennese Waltz (19)
Gili & Anastasia	Waltz (18)	Rumba (16)

== Highest and lowest scoring performances ==
The best and worst performances in each dance according to the judges' 30-point scale are as follows:

Dance	Best dancer(s)	Highest score	Worst dancer(s)	Lowest score
Cha Cha Cha	Asaf Hertz	29	Shlomi Lahiani	15
Waltz	Miki Geva	27	Miki Geva	15
Quickstep	Miki Geva	27	Shlomi Lahiani	19
Viennese Waltz	Asaf Hertz	30	Shlomi Lahiani; Amit Farkash; Miki Geva; Shlomo Baraba	19
Rumba	Avihu Shabat; Orna Datz	22	Gil Mossinson; Shlomi Lahiani; Amit Farkash	16
Salsa	Asaf Hertz	25	Esti Zakhaim	18
Tango	Amit Farkash	25	Ilanit; Noa Mayman	20
Paso Doble	Asaf Hertz	23	Amit Farkash	15
Jive	Amit Farkash	28	Dana Adini	21
Samba	Asaf Hertz	29	Orna Datz; Yuval Shem Tov; Asaf Hertz	23
Foxtrot	Miki Geva	25	Yuval Shem Tov	23
Freestyle	Miki Geva	29	Asaf Hertz	28

== Weekly scores and songs ==
Unless indicated otherwise, individual judges scores in the charts below (given in parentheses) are listed in this order from left to right: Uri Paster, Michal Amdurski, Eli Mizrahi.

=== Week 1 ===
==== Night 1 ====
Couple	Score	Dance	Music
Avihu & Alina	19 (7,6,6)	Cha-cha-cha	"Give Me Everything" — Pitbull featuring Ne-Yo, Afrojack and Nayer
Yuval & Viki	19 (6,7,6)	Waltz	"Can You Feel the Love Tonight" — Elton John
Amit & Oron	18 (7,6,5)	Cha-cha-cha	"On the Floor" — Jennifer Lopez featuring Pitbull
Esti & Boris	18 (7,5,6)	Cha-cha-cha	"We Found Love" — Rihanna featuring Calvin Harris
Noa & Danny	17 (6,7,4)	Waltz	"Noladet Bishvili" — Eyal Golan
Shlomo & Polina	19 (8,6,5)	Cha-cha-cha	"My Heart Belongs to Daddy" — Mary Martin

==== Night 2 ====
Couple	Score	Dance	Music
Ilanit & Haim	17 (6,6,5)	Cha-cha-cha	"Rolling in the Deep" — Adele
Asaf & Masha	21 (7,7,7)	Cha-cha-cha	"Dynamite" — Taio Cruz
Orna & Yaniv	19 (7,6,6)	Waltz	"Nifradnu Kach" — Avner Gadassi
Miki & Yulia	15 (6,5,4)	Waltz	"Todas las Palabras" — Marta Gomez
Dana & Anton	19 (8,6,5)	Cha-cha-cha	"Tragedy" — Bee Gees
Gili & Anastasia	18 (7,7,4)	Waltz	"The House of the Rising Sun" — The Animals
Shlomi & Rina	15 (6,4,5)	Cha-cha-cha	"Adoni" — Roni Duani

=== Week 2: Most Memorable Year / Personal Story Week ===
==== Night 1 ====
Couple	Score	Dance	Music
Shlomo & Polina	20 (8,6,6)	Quickstep	"Puttin' On The Ritz" — Fred Astaire
Esti & Boris	22 (8,7,7)	Viennese Waltz	"Af Ahat" — Miri Mesika
Gili & Anastasia	16 (5,5,6)	Rumba	"(Where Do I Begin?) Love Story" — Francis Lai
Orna & Yaniv	19 (7,6,6)	Salsa	"Only Girl (In the World)" — Rihanna
Miki & Yulia	19 (7,5,7)	Rumba	"Yoman Masa" — Aviv Geffen
Avihu & Alina	20 (7,7,6)	Viennese Waltz	"Kshe'Ata" — Manor Shabat

==== Night 2 ====
Couple	Score	Dance	Music
Yuval & Viki	19 (6,6,7)	Rumba	"Reality" — Richard Sanderson
Dana & Anton	19 (6,7,6)	Waltz	"La Nave del Olvido" — Aris San
Shlomi & Rina	19 (7,6,6)	Viennese Waltz	"I Put a Spell on You" — Nina Simone
Ilanit & Haim	20 (8,7,5)	Tango	"Ahavata Shel Tereza Dimon" — Ilanit
Asaf & Masha	22 (6,8,8)	Quickstep	"The Time Warp" — from The Rocky Horror Show
Noa & Danny	19 (7,6,6)	Paso Doble	"Hai Shketa" — Riki Gal
Amit & Oron	19 (7,6,6)	Viennese Waltz	"Hallelujah" — Leonard Cohen

=== Week 3 ===
==== Night 1: Sixties Night / The Beatles Special ====
Couple	Score	Dance	Music
Ilanit & Haim	22 (8,7,7)	Jive	"Love Me Do" — The Beatles
Yuval & Viki	21 (7,7,7)	Quickstep	"Help!" — The Beatles
Shlomi & Rina	16 (6,5,5)	Rumba	"Yesterday" — The Beatles
Dana & Anton	21 (7,7,7)	Jive	"She Loves You" — The Beatles
Noa & Danny	20 (6,7,7)	Tango	“Eleanor Rigby“ — The Beatles
Asaf & Masha	20 (8,5,7)	Rumba	“And I Love Her“ — The Beatles

==== Night 2: Classical Night / Opera Special ====
Couple	Score	Dance	Music
Avihu & Alina	22 (7,8,7)	Rumba	"'O Sole Mio" — Eduardo di Capua
Miki & Yulia	19 (9,5,5)	Viennese Waltz	"La Donna è Mobile" — Giuseppe Verdi
Orna & Yaniv	21 (6,8,7)	Tango	"Habanera" — Georges Bizet
Shlomo & Polina	19 (7,7,5)	Viennese Waltz	"Libiamo ne' lieti calici" — Giuseppe Verdi
Amit & Oron	15 (4,7,4)	Paso Doble	"The Phantom of the Opera" — Andrew Lloyd Webber
Esti & Boris	22 (8,7,7)	Tango	"Dance of the Hours" — Amilcare Ponchielli

=== Week 4 ===
==== Night 1 ====
Couple	Score	Dance	Music
Asaf & Masha	23 (8,8,7)	Paso Doble	"S&M" — Rihanna
Esti & Boris	17 (6,6,5)	Rumba	"Historia de un Amor" — Carlos Eleta Almarán
Miki & Yulia	22 (7,7,8)	Paso Doble	"Sweet Dreams (Are Made of This)" — Eurythmics
Dana & Anton	18 (7,6,5)	Rumba	"So Far" — Habanot Nechama
Orna & Yaniv	22 (7,7,8)	Rumba	"Zikukim" — Moshe Peretz
Amit & Oron	16 (5,6,5)	Rumba	"In a Manner of Speaking" — Nouvelle Vague

==== Night 2 ====
Couple	Score	Dance	Music
Avihu & Alina	20 (7,8,5)	Paso Doble	"Not in Love" — Enrique Iglesias featuring Kelis
Ilanit & Haim	20 (8,6,6)	Rumba	"Careless Whisper" — George Michael
Noa & Danny	18 (7,6,5)	Rumba	"Kshe'at Noga'at Bi" — Boaz Sharabi
Yuval & Viki	21 (6,7,8)	Paso Doble	"Don't Let Me Be Misunderstood" – Santa Esmeralda
Shlomi & Rina	19 (7,6,6)	Paso Doble	"Grenade" – Bruno Mars

=== Week 5: Solo Week ===
Note: Every individual routine must contain a solo part performed by the celebrity. All couples then go on to perform a group routine. Every judge awards 5 points bonus to their favorite couple.

==== Night 1 ====
Couple	Score	Dance	Music
Shlomi & Rina	19 (7,6,6)	Quickstep	"Mr. Saxobeat" – Alexandra Stan
Noa & Danny	19 (7,6,6)	Salsa	"Wanna Be Startin' Somethin'" – Michael Jackson
Miki & Yulia	22 (8,7,7)	Salsa	"Suavemente" – Elvis Crespo
Ilanit & Haim	23 (9,7,7)	Quickstep	"Hey, Soul Sister" – Train
Asaf & Masha	25 (9,8,8)	Salsa	"Baila Me" – Gipsy Kings
Shlomi & Rina; Noa & Dani; Miki & Yulia; Ilanit & Haim; Asaf & Masha	Judges' choice (5 bonus points): Uri: Ilanit & Haim; Michal: Asaf & Masha; Eli: Noa & Danny	Group Hustle	"Hot Stuff" – Donna Summer

==== Night 2 ====
Couple	Score	Dance	Music
Orna & Yaniv	20 (7,7,6)	Quickstep	"Come On Eileen" – Dexys Midnight Runners
Yuval & Viki	22 (8,8,6)	Salsa	
Avihu & Alina	24 (9,8,7)	Quickstep	"Big Girl (You Are Beautiful)" – Mika
Esti & Boris	18 (6,6,6)	Salsa	"Hoy" – Gloria Estefan
Amit & Oron	23 (8,7,8)	Quickstep	"We Go Together" — from Grease
Orna & Yaniv; Yuval & Viki; Avihu & Alina; Esti & Boris; Amit & Oron	Judges' choice (5 bonus points): Uri: Avihu & Alina; Michal: Orna & Yaniv; Eli: Yuval & Viki	Group Hustle	"You Should Be Dancing" – Bee Gees

=== Week 6: Duel Week ===
Note: The couples were randomly divided into four teams, each consisting of two couples. Every team performed an unlearned dance. Instead of scoring, the judges picked the better of two couples in every performance. The winners were safe for next week, while the losers had to perform another routine, which they had not done before.

==== Duel Part ====
Team	Judges' votes	Dance	Music
Miki & Yulia; Esti & Boris	Uri: Esti & Boris; Michal: Esti & Boris; Eli: Esti & Boris	Samba	"Pitsirika" – Mathaio Giannoulis & Lefteris Vazaios
Yuval & Viki; Amit & Oron	Uri: Amit & Oron; Michal: Amit & Oron; Eli: Yuval & Viki	Samba	"Papi" – Jennifer Lopez
Shlomi & Rina; Asaf & Masha	Uri: Asaf & Masha; Michal: Asaf & Masha; Eli: Asaf & Masha	Foxtrot	"Set Fire to the Rain" – Adele
Orna & Yaniv; Ilanit & Haim	No voting due to Ilanit's withdrawal; Orna & Yaniv automatically won the duel.	Foxtrot	"Back to Black" – Amy Winehouse

==== Individual Part ====
Couple	Score	Dance	Music
Miki & Yulia	22 (8,7,7)	Tango	"Viva la Vida" – Coldplay
Yuval & Viki	26 (9,9,8)	Viennese Waltz	"Lalechet" – Liran Danino
Shlomi & Rina	21 (7,7,7)	Salsa	"Bailamos" – Enrique Iglesias

=== Week 7: Then & Now Special ===
Note: The remaining couples were divided into two teams. The first team, called Team "Then", danced to Israeli music from the 1970s, while the second team, Team "Now" had contemporary Israeli songs for their dances. After an individual round, each team performed a group routine. In both teams, the group routine score was added to scores from the individual round giving a combined team score out of 120. Members of the team with a higher overall score were safe for next week, while the losing team saw two of its three couples eliminated.

Team	Couple	Score	Dance	Music
"Then"	Esti & Boris	24 (8,9,7)	Foxtrot	"Ani Holem al Naomi" – Hedva & David
"Then"	Amit & Oron	24 (8,8,8)	Foxtrot	"Ani Roe Otah Ba'Dereh La'Gimnazia" – Arik Einstein
"Then"	Miki & Yulia	27 (9,9,9)	Quickstep	"Ein Lach Ma Lidog" – Uri Fuchs
"Now"	Orna & Yaniv	22 (7,8,7)	Cha-cha-cha	"Mehuzakim Le'Olam" – Avraham Tal
"Now"	Yuval & Viki	23 (7,8,8)	Foxtrot	"Other People's Dreams" – Idan Raichel
"Now"	Asaf & Masha	29 (9,10,10)	Samba	"Ahla Hamuda" – Beni Bashan
"Now"	Orna & Yaniv; Yuval & Viki; Asaf & Masha	23 (7,7,9)	Group Samba	"Yafyufa" – Eyal Golan
"Then"	Esti & Boris; Amit & Oron; Miki & Yulia	27 (10,9,8)	Group Samba	"Karnaval Ba'Nahal" – Yair Rosenblum

Team "Then" were proclaimed the winners with 102 points out of 120. The losing team, Team "Now" collected 97 points. All of Team "Then" couples were safe. Two couples from Team "Now" were eliminated based on combined individual dance scores and viewers' votes.

=== Week 8: Instant Choreography Week ===
Note: All couples performed an Instant Jive, which means the song they had to dance to was revealed to them just 30 minutes before the performance.
Individual judges scores in the charts below (given in parentheses) are listed in this order from left to right: Uri Paster, Michal Amdurski, Claude Dadia.

Couple	Score	Dance	Music
Amit & Oron	25 (9,7,9)	Tango	"Firework" – Katy Perry
Amit & Oron	28 (9,9,10)	Instant Jive	"Let's Twist Again" – Chubby Checker
Esti & Boris	23 (8,8,7)	Waltz	"Kiss from a Rose" – Seal
Esti & Boris	26 (9,8,9)	Instant Jive	"Hit the Road Jack" — Ray Charles
Miki & Yulia	25 (9,8,8)	Foxtrot	"Shake It Out" — Florence and the Machine
Miki & Yulia	24 (9,7,8)	Instant Jive	"Great Balls of Fire" — Jerry Lee Lewis
Asaf & Masha	30 (10,10,10)	Viennese Waltz	"Gvulot Higayon" — Nathan Goshen
Asaf & Masha	23 (7,9,7)	Instant Jive	"Hound Dog" — Elvis Presley

=== Week 9: Finals Week ===
Note: The three final couples performed their Week 1 dance again. Judges' scores were combined with viewers' votes and the lowest scoring couple was eliminated. The top 2 couples went on to perform their final dance, a Freestyle.

Couple	Score	Dance	Music
Amit & Oron	24 (8,8,8)	Cha-cha-cha	"On the Floor" — Jennifer Lopez featuring Pitbull
Miki & Yulia	27 (9,9,9)	Waltz	"Todas las Palabras" — Marta Gomez
Miki & Yulia	29 (10,9,10)	Freestyle	"Use Somebody" — Kings of Leon
Asaf & Masha	29 (9,10,10)	Cha-cha-cha	"Dynamite" — Taio Cruz
Asaf & Masha	28 (10,8,10)	Freestyle	"Party Rock Anthem" — LMFAO featuring Lauren Bennett and GoonRock

== Dance Chart ==
Couple	1	2	3	4	5A		5B		6		7		8		9	
Asaf & Masha	Cha-cha-cha	Quickstep	Rumba	Paso Doble	Salsa	Hustle	—	—	Foxtrot	—	Samba	Samba	Viennese Waltz	Jive	Cha-cha-cha	Freestyle
Miki & Yulia	Waltz	Rumba	Viennese Waltz	Paso Doble	Salsa	Hustle	—	—	Samba	Tango	Quickstep	Samba	Foxtrot	Jive	Waltz	Freestyle
Amit & Oron	Cha-cha-cha	Viennese Waltz	Paso Doble	Rumba	—	—	Quickstep	Hustle	Samba	—	Foxtrot	Samba	Tango	Jive	Cha-cha-cha	
Esti & Boris	Cha-cha-cha	Viennese Waltz	Tango	Rumba	—	—	Salsa	Hustle	Samba	—	Foxtrot	Samba	Waltz	Jive		Waltz
Orna & Yaniv	Waltz	Salsa	Tango	Rumba	—	—	Quickstep	Hustle	Foxtrot	—	Cha-cha-cha	Samba				Quickstep
Yuval & Viki	Waltz	Rumba	Quickstep	Paso Doble	—	—	Salsa	Hustle	Samba	Viennese Waltz	Foxtrot	Samba				Paso Doble
Shlomi & Rina	Cha-cha-cha	Viennese Waltz	Rumba	Paso Doble	Quickstep	Hustle	—	—	Foxtrot	Salsa						Viennese Waltz
Ilanit & Haim	Cha-cha-cha	Tango	Jive	Rumba	Quickstep	Hustle	—	—	Foxtrot							Jive
Avihu & Elina	Cha-cha-cha	Viennese Waltz	Rumba	Paso Doble	—	—	Quickstep	Hustle								Paso Doble
Noaa & Dani	Waltz	Paso Doble	Tango	Rumba	Salsa	Hustle										Paso Doble
Dana & Anton	Cha-cha-cha	Waltz	Jive	Rumba												Jive
Shlomo & Polina	Cha-cha-cha	Quickstep	Viennese Waltz													Quickstep
Gili & Anastasia	Waltz	Rumba														Rumba

Highest scoring dance
Lowest scoring dance
Performed, but not scored
Not performed due to withdrawal
