= HaDugmaniyot season 1 =

HaDugmaniyot
- Season 1
- No. of episodes: 15

Release
- Original network: Channel 10
- Original release: February 21 – June 5, 2005

Season chronology
- Next → Season 2

The first cycle of HaDugmaniot aired from March 2005 to June 23, 2005, on Channel 10 and saw 16 girls compete for the title of the new Israeli Top Model. Hosted by Galit Gutman. The cycle contained 15 episodes (including casting episode, recap episode, comeback episodes and after-the-show episode).

The prize package for this cycle included a three-year modeling contract with Look Agency, representation by Maybelline New York and a 3-day trip to New York City from Maybelline.

After the original top 3 was chosen, the thirteen prior eliminated girls received another chance to compete in the final when all of them were brought back in Episode 11. At the end of that episode, all of them voted for which girl they wanted to be in the final. Evelin Piotrowska are the girl will compete in the live finale.

She joined Liat Bello, Liat Ben-Rashi & Victoria Katzman in the live final, where the audience voted Victoria the winner of the cycle.

== Contestants ==
(ages stated are at start of contest)

Contestant	Age	Height	Hometown	Outcome	Place
Alex Hazin	20	1.70 m (5 ft 7 in)	Bat Yam	Episode 2	16-13
Daniella Peri	17	1.74 m (5 ft 8 1/2 in)	Tel Aviv	Episode 2	16-13
Sivan Marciano	21	1.70 m (5 ft 7 in)		Episode 2	16-13
Raheli Takala	28	1.71 m (5 ft 7 1/2 in)	Jerusalem	Episode 2	16-13
Maya Tal	21	1.72 m (5 ft 7 1/2 in)	Herzliya	Episode 3	12
Angel Ogasta	18	1.65 m (5 ft 5 in)	Bat Yam	Episode 4	11
Adi Strod	22	1.73 m (5 ft 8 in)	Ness Ziona	Episode 5	10-9
Alexandra Sherman	18	1.71 m (5 ft 7 1/2 in)	Beersheba	Episode 5	10-9
Olga Lopatin	21	1.68 m (5 ft 6 in)	Beersheba	Episode 6	8
Meitar Amos	19	1.80 m (5 ft 11 in)	Haifa	Episode 7	7
Ines Halif	21	1.60 m (5 ft 3 in)	Petah Tikva	Episode 8	6
Netta Karisi	19	1.66 m (5 ft 5 1/2 in)	Ashkelon	Episode 10	5
Evelin Piotrowska	28	1.67 m (5 ft 5 1/2 in)	Tel Aviv	Episode 12	4
Liat Ben-Rashi	21	1.76 m (5 ft 9 1/2 in)	Petah Tikva	Episode 12	3
Liat Bello	21	1.67 m (5 ft 5 1/2 in)	Herzliya	Episode 12	2
Victoria Katzman	18	1.72 m (5 ft 7 1/2 in)	Nahariya	Episode 12	1

== Episode summaries ==
=== Episode 1 ===
Original airdate: 21 February 2005

Casting episode. 50 girls were selected for the final selection stage. At the end, 16 girls are chosen for the competition.

=== Episode 2 ===
Original airdate: 6 March 2005

The 16 chosen girls from 50 semi-finalist has come from all over the country to Tel Aviv. The girls were told to come to the pick-up point and surprised them when they came to pick them up with a limosuine. They went to the Dan Hotel, where they will live throughout the series. In the next day, the girls has their first photoshoot in bathing suits at the beach. There, Galit informed them that at the end of the day 4 girls will be going home.

After the mission, they move to the judging room where Galit and the judges will have to choose who they think has not passed the task successfully and unworthy to continue the competition. As the result, Angel & Neta were chosen to meet with the judges. At the end, Alex, Daniella, Raheli & Sivan were eliminated.

- Eliminated: Alex Hazin, Daniella Perry, Raheli Takala & Sivan Marciano

=== Episode 3 ===
Original airdate: 13 March 2005

The 12 remaining girls undergo a makeover that will give them the appearance of professional models. Before the makeover, they meet with judges Betty and Elimor who point out the weak sides of each one and suggest ways to shape the body and improve the overall appearance. Not all of them take the judges' comments very well. Some embrace their new look while others not, especially Angel, who has not had a haircut since the age of 3, reacts harshly to the judges' demand to cut her hair shorter.

Immediately after the transformation, the girls are sent to the next mission - a photoshoot in a sexy atmosphere with the Israeli supermodel, Raz Meirman. The next day, they move to the judging room where Galit and the judges will have to choose who they think has not passed the task successfully and unworthy to continue the competition. At the end, Maya was eliminated.

- Eliminated: Maya Tal

=== Episode 4 ===
Original airdate: 20 March 2005

After Maya got eliminated, Netta, who could not stand the pressure and separation from home, left the girls a personal letter, left the hotel and quit the competition. The girls spent some resting and Meitar recorded with a home video camera what was happening in the hotel. Not everyone liked Meitar's attempt to fit in as one of them. Adi and Meitar worsen their relationship against the background of Adi's accusations that Meitar is rude and a liar.

The next day, they arrive at the exhibition destination and they meet Nimrod Peled, the show's director who teaches them how to walk on the runway. Later, the girls first get on the track in the prestigious fashion show of designer Shay Touboul. After the mission, they move to the judging room where Galit and the judges will have to choose who they think has not passed the task successfully and unworthy to continue the competition. As the result, Olga were chosen to meet with the judges. At the end, Angel was eliminated.

- Eliminated: Angel Augusta

=== Episode 5 ===
Original airdate: 27 March 2005

The contestants are being trained by Haim Etgar, who is trying to teach them how to deal with a television interview and problematic questions. Victoria, who until now has been seen as an innocent girl from the north, turns out to be a pretty stalwart. Not all this turns out, internalize the lesson with life. Adi volunteered one answer too and informs the public in particular of her intimate life. Ines does not stop talking in the interview and forgets about modesty at home.

The next day, they have an Olympic-style photoshoot for Reebok. After the mission, they move to the judging room where Galit and the judges will have to choose who they think has not passed the task successfully and unworthy to continue the competition. As the result, Adi, Ines, Olga & Victoria were chosen to meet with the Ines thrilling the judges in a one-time show that softens even Betty Rockaway. At the end, Adi & Alexandra were eliminated.

- Eliminated: Adi Stroud & Alexandra Sherman

=== Episode 6 ===
Original airdate: 3 April 2005

The remaining girls are required to go through the first commercials audition for Lux soap with actor Tsek Berkman. The band Meira Ben Atar and commercial director Yariv Horwitz will try to find out which of the girls has the right skills for the game. Ines fails to stop the tears, Evelin finds it difficult to audition in Hebrew and jumps on the director's proposal to be tested in Polish, and Liat Bel. is not afraid of the camera and approaches the dough with reliable sensuality.

The next task facing the girls is a meeting with Yoram Dembinski, the CEO of the advertising company that keeps the budget for the advertisement for which they were examined, and Yoram, who meet with the event's guests, in order to convince him that they are real stars who can lead a great campaign. Meitar thinks her variance fits the campaign, Liat Ben. argues that her arrogance is necessary for the star of a major campaign and Olga thinks the fact that she is Olga is certainly satisfying.

- Eliminated: Olga Loftin

=== Episode 7 ===
Original airdate: 10 April 2005

The remaining girls are in for a surprise, when Netta has returned to the competition returned after quitting because of longing for her family. The girls find out that and feel that they faced difficulties and tasks that were spared from Netta. Evelyn and Liat Bel. are unable to hide their resentment and wage an open struggle against Netta. They later arrive at a warehouse for their next mission - a catalog photoshoot for Triumph lingerie, and Netta have second thoughts about going back. Later, the girls have their next mission - a fashion show in a shopping mall in Netanya and the girls had to show complete independence regarding makeup and hair, but Meitar shows signs of indifference and Netta is depressed. In the crowd, the marketing director of an international cosmetics company, who came to choose the next face of the company, secretly watched the show, and chose Victoria as the best of the show. As the result, Victoria won immunity and will be the next face of the cosmetics campaign.

The next day, they move to the judging room where Galit and the judges will have to choose who they think has not passed the task successfully and unworthy to continue the competition. As the result, all the girls decided to choose Netta to go in front of the judges. At the elimination, Meitar and Netta landed in the bottom 2, and the judges decided to give Netta one last chance, and not let her give in to the boycott that the girls had made. The judges harshly criticized Meitar, who was indifferent and did not invest at all in a fashion show. At the end, Meitar was eliminated.

- Eliminated: Meitar Amos

=== Episode 8 ===
Original airdate: 17 April 2005

The remaining 6 girls have sports lessons. Ines tries to fight her weepy image and invests many hours in physical training to ease herself. But during training, Ines continues to make excuses for her lack of action. The girls arrive at the next mission - a cover-try shoot for the weekly Pnai Plus. The editor-in-chief, Yigal Galai, and a reporter from the weekly are present on the set. The girls find it difficult to take the poses they are required to take, especially Netta, who finds it difficult to deal with revealing photos in her opinion. Evelyn also has trouble bringing out sexiness, according to the photographer, but Liat Ben-Rashi excels with a flowing and excellent photo set.

The girls are surprised with an evening of treats. The girls go through a make-up and hair session, in preparation for the real surprise, meeting everyone's friends. Evelin says she admires the photogenicity of Ines, Ines tells a free time reporter that she is waiting for a ring from her boyfriend who is abroad, Liat Bel. reveals that she wants to find her roots in Brazil, and Victoria reveals that she and her boyfriend are in an unclear situation. The girls get a huge surprise in the hotel suite: The friends come to an exciting visit and are examined by Galit to the extent that they know their partners. The exciting meeting led to a couples match, the winners of which will receive the luxurious suite for a whole night. But the doubles match got too heated, resulting in an explosion between Victoria and Evelyn. Evelyn was furious with Victoria who took away from her and her boyfriend the possibility of a pampering night in the suite.

The next day, they move to the judging room where Galit and the judges will have to choose who they think has not passed the task successfully and unworthy to continue the competition. As the result, all the girls send Victoria to the judges one more time, because of her frozen look. Victoria is afraid that she will be eliminated, and bursts into tears after sitting with Galit and the other girls. During the elimination, Netta, Liat Ben., Liat Bel., and Eveliyn were informed that they had advanced to the next round and will get to appear on the cover of Pnai Plus magazine. Vicky explains herself to the judges, who decided to give her another chance. The judges decided to eliminate Ines, after disappointing results in photographs for the gate.

- Eliminated: Ines Halif

=== Episode 9 ===
Original airdate: 24 April 2005

Recap episode, and showed previously unaired footage for the first time.

=== Episode 10 ===
Original airdate: 1 May 2006

5 remaining girls received warm regards from the house through Channel 10 News reporter Roni Kuban, who met the families and brought the exciting recordings from the family to the participants. They were moved and cried a lot when they saw the tapes from the family, but Netta's tape moved them all, when the relationship between her and Evelin warmed up, after Evelin said she understood why Netta had a hard time in the competition.

Later, they have their last and hardest photoshoot of all: a nude photoshoot with Padani jewelry, and They will be photographed by judge Eshel Ezer. The girls enter the waiting room and show opposition to the task, debating whether to carry out the task, especially Netta who doesn't even prepare in terms of "clothing". Only Evelyn didn't think twice and said she would do it and manages to pressure Victoria, Liat Bel., who is afraid of the parents' reaction. Victoria took a picture first, and when she entered the rest room, Evelin tries to undermine her confidence by saying that she "is not sure she will be photographed naked, and now only Victoria came out cheap". But it turned out that the statement was empty of content, and was really only intended to undermine Victoria. Eshel Ezer is surprised by the results of Evelin's photography, which according to him was able to "bring out something higher". When Liat Ben. takes a picture, Netta takes a look at the set, but is still afraid of doing the task. Liat Bel. particularly impressed Eshel, with a particularly impressive set. And after some hesitation, Netta decides not to be photographed and thus determines her future for her rise to the big finals.

In the judging room with Galit to decide who will appear in front of the judges, the girls have to choose 2 of them to appear. Most of the girls sent Netta, following the refusal to participate in the photoshoot. The alliance between the Liat continues, but Liat Bel. finds it difficult to choose someone else and bursts into tears because she is obliged to choose a second contestant. She finally chose Evelin, and she finds it hard to bear the fact that she hurt Evelin like that and it is hard for Evelin to accept the sweeping decision of her friends. Finally Netta and Evelin go up in front of the judges. At the end, the judges decided that Victoria, Liat Ben. and Liat Bel. advance to the finals. The judges decided that Netta and Evelin return the necklace and return home. And Galit cries when she informs Evelin that she have to return the necklace and go home.

- Eliminated: Evelin Piotrowska & Netta Karisi

=== Episode 11 ===
Original airdate: 8 May 2005

Sivan Marciano, Raheli Takala, Daniella Perry, Alex Hazin, Maya Tal, Angel Ogasta, Adi Strod, and Alexandra Sherman expressed interest in returning to the show.

=== Episode 12 ===
Original airdate: 15 May 2005

Meitar Amos, Olga Lopatin, Ines Halif, Netta Karisi and Evelin Piotrowska also want to return to the program... who do you want to return ?

=== Episode 13 ===
Original airdate: 22 May 2005

After the original top 3 was chosen, the thirteen prior eliminated girls received another chance to compete in the final from the viewer. Galit then announce the list of the girls who reached the last seven places: Sivan, Adi, Daniella, Raeheli, Alex, Mitar and Olga. After that, the three finalists so far showed their way, and for the first time with commentary and criticism by Galit Gutman, the model's mother. In addition, they showed a "day in the life" with each of the finalists.

We then later found out that Angel, Alexandra and Maya did not return to the show and will not make it to the finals. The three girls who reached the first three places in the audience votes are Ines, Netta and Evelin - who came to the special return studio. Finally, the result is that 40% of the audience chose Evelin, and she is the one who will return to the final show that will be broadcast next week. In terms of the ranking of the audience's votes, Netta was chosen for second place with 15% of the viewers' votes and Ines for third place. Later, a mini-forgiveness happen between Evelin and Victoria.

- Return: Evelin Petrowska

=== Episode 14 ===
Original airdate: 29 May 2005

In the live finale, all 16 girls have their first appearance with a fashion show of wedding dresses designed by Yair Germon. Later, Galit and the judges appear and presented highlights throughout the season. The winner is determined by 3 factors: the audience at home, the audience in the studio and the judges.

The first show of the 4 finalist is a fashion show in Diesel's summer clothes. The first task was in front of the super agent Paolo Tomai, among other things the agent of Claudia Schiffer and many other supermodels, when he examines the chances of the finalists for an international career. Paulo asked to meet, in addition to the finalists, Angel, Ines and Netta. The girls receive a 3-minute interview with the super agent, which is divided into a personal interview, a demonstration of walking skills on a runway and finally a headshot of each one. Regarding Liat Ben., Paolo said that she is not yet destined for an international career, despite impressive physique. About Liat Bel., he said that she is special, but short and therefore has a future in commercial more than on a runway. Evelin impressed Paolo, despite her poor English skills, and he told her that she had an amazing face but that she should reduce her breasts. He says that Evelin can succeed anywhere, only English will be a failure for her. He said about Victoria that she has a beautiful body, and that she has the greatest potential to succeed abroad of all the girls. The judges scored the international task for the girls.

The next fashion show is a display of Keds swimwear. After the show, we saw the long-awaited reconciliation between Evelin and Victoria, including the corny song from a wonderful land. After that, the girls went to another fashion show in Reebok sportswear, together with the girls' personal trainer, Tal Shaham. The second task was the performance of the song "I want to be a super model" including dance parts. Before the mission, we saw the rehearsals for the mission and the recordings of the song together with Saar Badishi, the musical director of the series "Our Song". Choreographer Hilik Cohen guides the girls to the dance segment, and he is supposed to choose which of the finalists will perform in the solo segment during the grand finale. Finally he chose the two Liat, since he believed that there was something real in them. The girls all came up to perform the song together with the dance part, and the judges began to score the dance task for the girls.

The girls go to Triumph's last fashion show for the 2005 summer season. The judges summarize all the girls' runway shows. In the final weighing of the judges of the program, Victoria, Ben Rashi, Blue and Evelyn lead. But nothing is over yet, it remains to weigh the votes of the spectators and the guest judges. At the end, Victoria was declared the winner.

Nº	Model	Judges' scores						Total Score
Nº	Model	#	Miki	Shiraz	Elimor	Betty	Eshel	Total Score
1	Victoria Katzman	International	9	9	9	10	10	147
1	Victoria Katzman	Dance	10	10	10	10	10	147
1	Victoria Katzman	Runway	10	10	10	10	10	147
2	Liat Bello	International	8	8	7	9	8	120
2	Liat Bello	Dance	9	9	9	8	8	120
2	Liat Bello	Runway	9	9	8	5	6	120
3	Liat Ben-Rashi	International	7	7	6	8	7	116
3	Liat Ben-Rashi	Dance	9	9	8	8	8	116
3	Liat Ben-Rashi	Runway	8	7	7	9	8	116
4	Evelin Piotrowska	International	7	6	6	7	6	101
4	Evelin Piotrowska	Dance	7	7	7	7	7	101
4	Evelin Piotrowska	Runway	7	8	7	6	6	101

- Final four: Evelin Piotrowska, Liat Bello, Liat Ben-Rashi, Victoria Katzman
- HaDugmaniot: Victoria Katzman

=== Episode 15 ===
Original airdate: 5 June 2005

This episode show the model's life after the live final.

== Results table ==
Place	Model	Episodes								
Place	Model	2	3	4	5	6	7	8	10	14
1	Victoria	SAFE	SAFE	SAFE	SAFE	LOW	IMM	LOW	IMM	WIN
2	Liat Bel.	SAFE	SAFE	SAFE	SAFE	SAFE	SAFE	SAFE	SAFE	OUT
3	Liat Ben.	SAFE	SAFE	SAFE	SAFE	IMM	SAFE	IMM	SAFE	OUT
4	Evelin	SAFE	SAFE	SAFE	SAFE	SAFE	SAFE	SAFE	OUT	OUT
5	Netta	SAFE	SAFE	QUIT			LOW	SAFE	OUT	
6	Ines	SAFE	SAFE	SAFE	SAFE	SAFE	SAFE	OUT		
7	Meitar	SAFE	SAFE	IMM	SAFE	SAFE	OUT			
8	Olga	SAFE	SAFE	SAFE	SAFE	OUT				
10-9	Adi	SAFE	SAFE	IMM	OUT					
10-9	Alexandra	SAFE	SAFE	LOW	OUT					
11	Angel	SAFE	LOW	OUT						
12	Maya	SAFE	OUT							
16-13	Alex	OUT								
16-13	Daniela	OUT								
16-13	Rahel	OUT								
16-13	Sivan	OUT								

The contestant was immune from elimination
The contestant was in danger of elimination
The contestant withdrew from the competition
The contestant was eliminated
The contestant won the competition

=== Photo shoot guide ===
- Episode 2 photo shoot: Swimwear at the beach
- Episode 3 photo shoot: Selling a motor with a male model
- Episode 4 runway: Shay Touboul's design on the runway
- Episode 5 photo shoot: Olympics style shoot for Reebok
- Episode 6 challenge: Auditioned for a television advertisement
- Episode 7 photo shoot: Lingerie in a warehouse
- Episode 8 photo shoot: Pnai Plus magazine cover
- Episode 10 photo shoot: Topless with Padani jewelry

== Ratings ==
Episode Viewing figures from Ynet

No. in series	No. in season	Episode	Air date	Ratings	Viewers (in thousands)	Rank		Source
No. in series	No. in season	Episode	Air date	Ratings	Viewers (in thousands)	Daily	Weekly	Source
1	1	"The Countdown"	21 February 2005	10.4%	—N/a	#8	—N/a	
2	2	"Chapter 1"	6 March 2005	10%	148.090	#8	#29	
3	3	"Chapter 2"	13 March 2005	13.1%	193.340	#4	#19	
4	4	"Chapter 3"	20 March 2005	9.6%	141.710	—N/a	#32	
5	5	"Chapter 4"	27 March 2005	10.9%	160.280	—N/a	#23	
6	6	"Chapter 5"	3 April 2005	11.2%	165.060	—N/a	#26	
7	7	"Chapter 6"	10 April 2005	11.6%	167.500	—N/a	#21	
8	8	"Chapter 7"	17 April 2005	10.5%	156.400	—N/a	#21	
9	9	"Behind The Runway"	24 April 2005	4.1%	60.350	—N/a	#94	
19	10	"Chapter 8"	1 May 2005	14%	207.500	#3	#22	
11	11	"Compilation (Part 1)"	8 May 2005	7.2%	106.550	—N/a	#63	
12	12	"Compilation (Part 2)"	15 May 2005	8.9%	131.980	—N/a	#34	
13	13	"The Lifebuoy"	22 May 2008	8.6%	—N/a	—N/a	—N/a	
14	14	"The Final"	29 May 2005	13%	193.610	#5	#20	
15	15	"The Day After"	5 June 2005	5.7%	84.670	#16	#50	
