= Rokdim Im Kokhavim season 6 =

Rokdim Im Kokhavim
- Season 6
- Celebrity winner: Shlomi Koriat
- Professional winner: Hadas Fisher
- No. of episodes: 10

Release
- Original network: Channel 2
- Original release: October 31, 2010 – January 17, 2011

Season chronology
- ← Previous; Series 5 Next → Season 7

Rokdim Im Kokhavim 6 is the 6th season of the popular reality TV show Rokdim Im Kokhavim. It is hosted by Avi Kushnir and Hilla Nachshon with judges Eli Mizrahi, Claude Dadia and the Newest Hanna Laslo. This season take in guests Pamela Anderson and Emilia Attias.

== Couples ==
Celebrity	Professional	Position
Sharon Haziz (singer)	Yaniv Kakon	1st Eliminated
Itzik Zohar (former international footballer)	Alona Diskin	2nd Eliminated
Hila Alfert (actress, journalist)	Haim Pershtein	3rd Eliminated
Aki Avni (actor, TV Host)	Polina Chiktonov	4th Eliminated
Gili Shem Tov (sports presenter)	Dorit Milman	5th Eliminated
Tal Berkowicz (model)	Boris Zaltzman	6th Eliminated
Kobi Peretz (singer)	Rina Greenspan	7th Eliminated
Merhav Mohar (boxer)	Anastasia Shapiro	8th Eliminated
Dalia Mazor (newsreader)	Dani Yochtman	9th Eliminated
Adi Himmelbleu (actress, model)	Dennis Belochrekovski	Third
Ron Shahar (actor)	Ana Aharonov	Second
Shlomi Koriat (actor, comedian)	Hadas Fisher	Winners

== Scores ==
Couple	Place	1	2	1+2	3	4	5	6	7	8	9
Shlomi & Hadas	1	21	23	44	22	21	22+26=48	27+26=53	30+10=40	23+30=53	28+29=57
Ron & Ana	2	15	18	33	24	23	22+20=42	21+26=47	27+0=27	27+23=50	29+27=56
Adi & Dennis	3	17	23	40	17	17	21+20=41	25+23=48	23+0=23	24+27=51	26
Dalia & Dani	4	21	22	43	19	13	19+24=43	23+26=49	20+0=20	24+20=44	
Merhav & Anastasia	5	17	21	38	21	23	19+22=41	22+23=45	25+0=25		
Kobi & Rina	6	18	19	37	21	20	19+21=40	19+23=42			
Tal & Boris	7	21	19	40	16	23	22+26=48				
Gili & Dorit	8	17	20	37	15	16					
Aki & Polina	9	17	22	39	21						
Hila & Haim	10	16	19	35	18						
Itzik & Alona	11	19	19	38							
Sharon & Yaniv	12	19	16	35							

Red numbers indicate the lowest score for each week.
Green numbers indicate the highest score for each week.
indicates the couple eliminated that week.
indicates the returning couple that finished in the bottom two.
indicates the winning couple.
indicates the runner-up couple.
indicates the third-place couple.

== Averages ==
Rank by average	Place	Couple	Total	Number of dances	Average
1	1	Shlomi & Hadas	328	13	25.2
2	2	Ron & Ana	302	13	23.4
3	3	Adi & Dennis	263	12	21.9
4	5	Merhav & Anastasia	193	9	21.4
5	7	Tal & Boris	127	6	21.2
6	4	Dalia & Dani	231	11	21.0
7	9	Aki & Polina	60	3	20.0
7	6	Kobi & Rina	160	8	20.0
9	11	Itzik & Alona	38	2	19.0
10	10	Hila & Haim	53	3	17.7
11	12	Sharon & Yaniv	35	2	17.5
12	8	Gili & Dorit	68	4	17.0

== Dances performed ==
Couple	1	2	3	4	5		6		7		8		9	
Shlomi & Hadas	Cha-Cha-Cha	Tango	Salsa	Samba	Quickstep	1970s	Paso doble	Cha-Cha-Cha	Waltz	Jive	Foxtrot	Rumba	Tango	Showdance
Ron & Ana	Cha-Cha-Cha	Tango	Salsa	Paso doble	Foxtrot	1970s	Samba	Cha-Cha-Cha	Waltz	Jive	Rumba	Quickstep	Foxtrot	Showdance
Adi & Dennis	Cha-Cha-Cha	Tango	Salsa	Paso doble	Foxtrot	1970s	Rumba	Cha-Cha-Cha	Quickstep	Jive	Samba	Waltz	Rumba	
Dalia & Dani	Waltz	Rumba	Quickstep	Paso doble	Cha-Cha-Cha	1970s	Tango	Cha-Cha-Cha	Salsa	Jive	Foxtrot	Samba		
Merhav & Anastasia	Cha-Cha-Cha	Tango	Quickstep	Paso doble	Salsa	1970s	Foxtrot	Cha-Cha-Cha	Rumba	Jive				
Kobi & Rina	Waltz	Rumba	Quickstep	Samba	Paso doble	1970s	Tango	Cha-Cha-Cha						
Tal & Boris	Cha-Cha-Cha	Tango	Salsa	Samba	Quickstep	1970s								
Gili & Dorit	Cha-Cha-Cha	Rumba	Quickstep	Samba										
Aki & Polina	Waltz	Rumba	Quickstep											
Hila & Haim	Cha-Cha-Cha	Tango	Salsa											
Itzik & Alona	Cha-Cha-Cha	Tango												
Sharon & Yaniv	Waltz	Rumba												

Highest scoring dance
Lowest scoring dance
