= Rokdim Im Kokhavim season 8 =

Reality dance show

Rokdim Im Kokhavim
- Season 8
- Celebrity winner: Alex Shatilov
- Professional winner: Nina Solovyov
- No. of episodes: 20

Release
- Original network: Channel 12
- Original release: February 13 – April 11, 2022

Season chronology
- ← Previous; Season 7 Next → Season 9

Rokdim Im Kokhavim 8 is the 8th season of the popular reality TV show Rokdim Im Kokhavim. After being cancelled in 2012 due to poor rating, the show returned to Channel 12 in 2022 with hostess Lucy Ayoub and judges Anna Aronov (head judge), David Dvir, Rona-Lee Shimon and Eli Mizrahi. The 8th season featured 16 couples. The season's winner is Olympic gymnast Alex Shatilov.

== Couples ==
Celebrity	Professional	Position
Estella (chef, baker, chocolatier)	Sergei Stefanov	1st Eliminated
Yuval Segal (actor, model)	Karin Sorochinski	2nd Eliminated
Eli Ildis (sport commentator)	Alona Diskin	3rd Eliminated
Idit Matot (professor, anaesthesiologist)	Dani Yochtman	4th Eliminated
Liran Danino (singer)	Julia Shachar	5th Eliminated
Omer Dror (actor, model)	Sana Sokol	6th Eliminated
Sendi Bar (actress, model)	Rafael Fleischmann	8th Eliminated
Bar Zomer (model)	Matanel Konevsky	Withdrew
Rotem Cohen (singer)	Michelle Ryaboy	9th Eliminated
Eden Fines (model, TV hostess)	Orel Kalf	10th Eliminated
Orel Tzabari (comedian)	Lital Lechtman Cohen	11th Eliminated
Moshe Ashkenazi (actor, comedian)	Jenia Leibman	7th & 12th Eliminated
Yael Bar Zohar (actress, TV hostess, model)	Anton Lapidos	13th Eliminated
Maayan Adam (TV personality, hostess)	Artem Liaskovski	Third
Adi Ashkenazi (comedian, TV hostess)	Haim Pershtein	Second
Alex Shatilov (plympian, artistic gymnast)	Nina Solovyov	Winners
