= ADD Agency =

Israeli talent agency and television production company

- Native name: סוכנות ADD
- Formerly: Look (לוק, 1988–2010)
- Type: Private
- Industry: Talent agency, modelling, television production
- Founded: 1988; 38 years ago (as Look); 2010; 16 years ago (as ADD)
- Founders: Hadas Mozes Lichtenstein, Yaron Lichtenstein, Yoni Dotan
- Headquarters: HaBarzel Street, Ramat HaHayal, Tel Aviv, Israel
- Key people: Yaron Lichtenstein (CEO); Yoni Dotan (Deputy CEO)
- Products: Television programming and format production in Israel and abroad; representation of actors, models, creators, directors and presenters
- Owners: Hadas Mozes Lichtenstein, Yaron Lichtenstein, Yoni Dotan, Moshe Edery
- Website: add-ca.com

ADD Agency (Hebrew: סוכנות ADD), known until 2010 as Look (Hebrew: לוק, romanized: Luk), is an Israeli talent agency based in Tel Aviv that represents actors, models, presenters, writers, directors and content creators. Founded in 1988 as a modeling agency, it was owned for much of its history by the Yedioth Ahronoth group and was relaunched under the ADD name in 2010. The agency also operates as a television content producer in its own right, modelled on the business model of the American agency William Morris Endeavor.

== History ==
=== Look (1988–2010) ===
The agency was founded in 1988 as the modelling agency Look. By the mid-2000s it operated three divisions – modelling, talent and extras – and represented some 100 models and performers, among them Galit Gutmann and Miri Bohadana. In September 2005 Yedioth Ahronoth, which held 51% of the agency, acquired the remaining 49% from the fashion producer Moti Reif and became its sole owner; Guy HaMeiri, who had served as CEO for two years, stepped down following the sale.

Under Yaron Lichtenstein, who became chief executive in 2005, the agency repositioned itself from a modelling agency to a representative of "multi-talents" working in film, television and reality programming; by 2009 models accounted for only about 20% of those it represented. Commentators noted that the agency benefited from the media holdings of its parent company, which included newspapers, local papers, magazines and the cable operator HOT.

=== ADD (2010–present) ===
In 2010 the agency was relaunched as ADD by Hadas Mozes, Yaron Lichtenstein and Yoni Dotan, the latter having previously served as CEO of Look. It was built along the lines of William Morris Endeavor, providing services across television, theatre and film production – from the development of a work through to the marketing and sale of the content in Israel and abroad.

In February 2012 it was reported that the Hollywood producer Arnon Milchan had established a "content incubator" with the agency, intended to promote Israeli content in the United States. Under the agreement, Milchan's New Regency Productions would invest in the development of ideas submitted to the agency by Israeli creators, and the agency would become Milchan's exclusive representative in Israel.

The majority of the agency's productions are made for HOT, in which Arnon Mozes, the father of Hadas Mozes-Lichtenstein, was formerly a partner, although it also produces content for Yes. In parallel the agency develops television formats and distributes them abroad.

Series produced by the agency include the game show Who Will Beat the Master, broadcast on Channel 2 in 2012; the docu-reality series Golstar, broadcast on HOT the same year; and the scripted series Wounded in the Head, starring Guy Amir and Hanan Savyon, who are also partners in the agency's content department.

In August 2015 United King Films, owned by Moshe and Leon Edery, acquired 25% of the agency's shares for 10 million shekels.

== Criticism ==
In an article on the media watchdog website The Seventh Eye, the journalist Oren Persico argued that clients of the agency appeared disproportionately in editorial content in outlets owned by the Mozes family, among them Pnai Plus, La'Isha and the supplements of Yedioth Ahronoth. Persico noted that of 84 photographs posted to the agency's official Facebook page in 2015, 56 had appeared on magazine covers or in articles featuring talent it represented, and that 46 of those 56 had appeared in outlets belonging to the Yedioth Ahronoth group. A similar claim was made in a September 2016 article on the same site, which argued that a cover interview with the actor Lior Ashkenazi in the 7 Layloth supplement served to promote the series The Exchange Principle, in which he starred alongside two other actors represented by the agency.

== Representation ==
Models and performers represented by the agency have included Galit Gutmann, Sivan Klein, Michael Lewis, Raz Meirman, Chava Mond and Hilla Nachshon, and, under the ADD name, Gal Gadot, Rotem Sela, Niv Sultan, Dana Ivgy, Assi Azar, Tzvika Hadar, Amit Rahav and Anna Zak, among others.

== See also ==
- Israeli fashion
- List of modeling agencies
