= HaDugmaniyot season 2 =

HaDugmaniyot
- Season 2
- No. of episodes: 13

Release
- Original network: Channel 10
- Original release: January 11 – April 12, 2006

Season chronology
- ← Previous; Season 1 Next → Season 3

Cycle two of HaDugmaniot aired from January 3, 2006 to April 12, 2006 on Channel 10 and saw 14 girls compete for the title of the new Israeli Top Model. Once again hosted by Galit Gutman, the cycle contained 13 episodes.

The prize for this cycle included a three-year modeling contract with Yuli Models and a campaign for Madina Milano cosmetic.

The international destination of the cycle was Milan. After the original top 3 was chosen, the eleven prior eliminated girls received another chance to compete in the final. Natali Sabag & Christin Fridman are the two will compete in the live finale.

They joined Alisia Estrin, Mimi Tadesa & Niral Karantinaji in the live final, where the audience voted Niral the winner of the cycle.

== Contestants ==
(ages stated are at start of contest)

Contestant	Age	Height	Hometown	Finish	Place
Liat Fadlon	25	1.73 m (5 ft 8 in)	Kfar Saba	Episode 1	14-13
Hila Chansky	19	1.82 m (5 ft 11 1/2 in)	Bat Yam	Episode 1	14-13
Polina 'Polly' Bandel	19	1.58 m (5 ft 2 in)	Acre	Episode 2	12
Naomi Zilber	20	1.70 m (5 ft 7 in)	Kadima-Tzoran	Episode 3	11
Ira Simonov	19	1.75 m (5 ft 9 in)	Tel Aviv	Episode 4	10
Sharon Markovich	19	1.63 m (5 ft 4 in)	Haifa	Episode 5	9
Mor Rimi	20	1.74 m (5 ft 8 1/2 in)	Tel Aviv	Episode 6	8
Keren Goltz	18	1.63 m (5 ft 4 in)	Kiryat Ata	Episode 9	7
Michelle Lourie	19	1.75 m (5 ft 9 in)	Herzliya	Episode 11	6
Christin Fridman	19	1.74 m (5 ft 8 1/2 in)	Givatayim	Episode 12	5-4
Alisia Estrin	20	1.75 m (5 ft 9 in)	Eilat	Episode 12	5-4
Mimi Tadesa	23	1.67 m (5 ft 5 1/2 in)	Eilat	Episode 12	3
Natali Sabag	22	1.75 m (5 ft 9 in)	Migdal HaEmek	Episode 12	2
Niral Karantinaji	20	1.74 m (5 ft 8 1/2 in)	Haifa	Episode 12	1

== Episode summaries ==
=== Episode 1 ===
Original airdate: 11 January 2006

The 14 girls chosen to compete for the title "HaDugmaniot" come from all over the country to Tel Aviv. They went to the Dan Panorama Hotel, where they will live throughout the series. Later, the girls greet a pool party held especially for them. They enjoy and splash until Kristine, who has drunk a little too much, breaks a glass on Naomi's foot and does not even apologize, Naomi cuts her finger and Ira protests against Kristine's behavior.

The next morning they leave for an unknown destination, where they meet Galit Gutman, who is sending them to their first photoshoot - a beauty shot in bathing suits in an all-ice set with a temperature of -5 degrees for a makeup calendar, influenced by the Russian trend that has recently taken over the world of fashion - a set of photographs of six tons of ice and found in the largest refrigeration room in Israel. The demands of the "crazy" photographer Ido Izak, who especially in solidarity with them, worked whole day on the set even without a coat. They quickly discover that the task is not easy at all and not all of them manage to stay cool in the set. After the mission, they move to the judging room where Galit and the judges will have to choose who they think should be eliminated from the competition. At the end, Hila was the first one to be sent home, Liat & Niral are at the bottom two and Liat are the second girl were forced to return home.

- Immune from elimination: Sharon Markovich
- First eliminated: Hila Chansky
- Bottom two: Liat Fadlon & Niral Karantinaji
- Second eliminated: Liat Fadlon

=== Episode 2 ===
Original airdate: 18 January 2006

The girls are beginning to realize that being a model is not only glittering when they are going to a classical ballet class and they do not know that the ballet lesson will prepare them for the next task, where the posture and the holding of the body are the most important thing. When they arrive at the exhibition destination, they meet Nimrod Peled, the show's director and Ronen Faraj, the stylist who teaches them how to walk on the track. After the two demonstrated the behavior of models on all over the world, girls are required to practice posture and walking with a book on their heads, up and down the stairs and are especially amazed to find that walking like Nimrod on heels will take them a long time. Sharon, who never walked on heels, had to go back and practice all day walking with a book on her head and Niral, full of motivation, practices walking behind the scenes and tries to improve.

In a head-to-head battle between the girls in front of the show designer, Yosef, and the right to open and close the show are Keren, Niral and Michelle. Mimi, on the other hand, finds it hard to win a private lesson with Galit. The girls first get on the track in the prestigious fashion show of designer Yosef. Two of the girls finish the evening with a sparkling cocktail alongside the designer, where they receive a flattering encounter with glittering personalities from the Israeli fashion industry and the judges. At the judging room, Mimi & Polly are at the bottom. At the end, Polly was eliminated.

- Immune from elimination: Keren Goltz & Niral Karantinaji
- Bottom two: Mimi Tadesa & Polly Bandel
- Eliminated: Polly Bandel

=== Episode 3 ===
Original airdate: 25 January 2006

The episode opens with an early waking, where the girls are called down to the beach for a morning run and a primary sports workout. On the beach, the girls meet for the first time Nissim Zuaretz, their demanding but sensitive fitness coach, the man who will make a hard life for them but will not give up the smile until they return home, well-dressed and satisfied. After the lesson, the girls eat breakfast and they do not know that this should be the last meal they load on the plates of cakes and pancakes because soon they will meet their dietician and they will have to adapt to a healthy diet that will be included in the training program of Nissim.

Later, they meet with judges Betty and Elimor, stylist Reuven Cohen, their fitness instructor and dietitian who point out the weak sides of each and offer ways to shape the body and improve the overall appearance. The girl later immediately receive makeovers but Mor, who says that no one but her touches her hair, says she doesn't like to shorten her hair and darken her hair. After the makeover, the girls have their next photoshoot, where they meet the photographers, Ido Lavi, who instructs them to be photographed with three topless male models, and is a bit too much for Natali. At the judging room, Mor & Naomi are at the bottom of the week and Naomi was eliminated.

- Immune from elimination: Alisia Estrin
- Bottom two: Mor Rimi & Naomi Zilber
- Eliminated: Naomi Zilber

=== Episode 4 ===
Original airdate: 1 February 2006

The girls spent the first weekend at rest, in conversations, and in a beach volleyball game, and they also received a first and exciting phone call home. On the next day, the girls had a dance class with Yaniv Suissa, but they don't know that the lesson prepares them for the next challenge: auditions to a music video of Subliminal and The Shadow. The contestants arrive at a club in Tel Aviv for the audition, Sharon was very suffering and can not connect to the dance make her have go to the hospital for tests during the auditions to the video.

After the auditions, the girls are sent to choose a dress from a hanger for two minutes as they will go out to the red carpet on which the elimination challenge awaits - they will be interviewed like real stars. The girls go out to the red carpet where they meet Koko, who photographed them as celebrity. As they in the red carpet, Ayelet Shani from "Good evening with Guy Pines" interviews the girls with tricky questions that examine their ability to appear as a star. Ira and Niral fall into the trap that Ayelet has buried for them and confront her whether Niral slapped Ira or not. Ira is not satisfied with the first mistake, and she gives Ayelet one more answer and informs the public about her life: relationship in a threesome. At the judging room, Ira & Sharon are at the bottom of the week but at the end, Ira is the one to go home.

- Immune from elimination: Keren Goltz & Natali Sabag
- Bottom two: Ira Simonov & Sharon Markovich
- Eliminated: Ira Simonov

=== Episode 5 ===
Original airdate: 8 February 2006

The girls go to a boxing class and they don't know that the skills taught by Nisim Zuartz & Moardi Glam, the gnarled guide, will be used in the future. They go to sleep exhausted after training. After a few hours they wake up to the sound of knocking at the door. For a moment they find it difficult to understand what is happening, while it is still dark outside.

The girls are on their next photoshoot: fairies in a dark forest. To their surprise at the end of the filming, the girls are taken to the mall, where they meet Miki & Elimor at the clothing inspection. At the end of the accelerated course in the styling they received, the girls take time to set up a new look. Michelle and Kristine receive compliments on their personal styling. Niral is crowned as the worst dresser and Sharon is not satisfied with the judges. The girls also do not know that their personal styling were being photographed by paparazzi, as they are walking down the street. At the judging room, Sharon was eliminated.

- Immune from elimination: Christin Fridman
- Bottom two: Keren Goltz & Sharon Markovich
- Eliminated: Sharon Markovich

=== Episode 6 ===
Original airdate: 15 February 2006

The remaining girls went to the Waltz class and meet the dance teacher, Sean Ziv. They don't know that this lesson prepares them for the next challenge and that the dance teacher will be part of the girls judgement. This time they are required to pass the first audition in their lives for an advertisement for wedding dresses with actor Rodrigo Gonzalez. Director Idan Amit and the dance teacher will try to find out which of the girls have the right skills for the challenge. Michelle surprise to find out that her ex-boyfriend Rodrigo is there and Natali finds it hard to kiss him.

At the end of the mission, the girls go to the next challenge: an interview with judge Miki Buganim. Mimi returns with sincerity when she reveals the heartfelt difficulties she has been through to this day and has caused her not to believe in herself, and Natali gets an unexpected and exciting surprise that her boyfriend come and proposal her, made the rest of the girls surprised and happy for her. At the judging room, Mor was eliminated, which made most of the girls shocked.

- Immune from elimination: Michelle Lourie
- First eliminated: Mor Rimi
- Bottom two: Alisia Estrin & Niral Karantinaji
- Second eliminated: None

=== Episode 7 ===
Original airdate: 22 February 2006

Recap episode.

=== Episode 8 ===
Original airdate: 8 March 2006

As part of the sports lessons, the girls undergo a surfing lesson with the instructor, Tal Man. They don't know that this will be put to the next photoshoot: underwater fashion. The girls return to the hotel where they meet the top fashion designers: Naama Hassin, Chaya Nir & Michal Zaidan, and the girl have audition with a designer to become they presenter. After the audition, the girls are photographed in the clothes that shape the pool and underwater, they do not know that the designers, together with Galit, are watching and judging them. Mimi is coping with all the photographer's demands, and Niral is unable to dive underwater so after she finish, she comes back frustrated to the girls. The girls think they can rest, but then they are taken to a polite class by Naomi Tal, where they hear for the first time that they are going to sell the pictures they appear in for sale for a good cause.

Surprised and excited, they arrive at the Sotheby's gallery, give entry on the red carpet and hear from Mr. Shimon Peres, who blesses them, as a microcosm of Israeli society. They mix with the guests of the event and polish their mingling skills, which they will have to prove right away against Rafi Elul, the chairman of the Good Spirit association, which connects volunteers to nonprofit organizations, in order to convince him that their picture is worth the highest amount of money. At the judging room, Michelle & Natali are at the bottom of the week, and Natali was eliminated on the tearful goodbye with the remaining girls.

- Immune from elimination: Mimi Tadesa
- Bottom two: Michelle Lourie & Natali Sabag
- Eliminated: Natali Sabag

=== Episode 9 ===
Original airdate: 15 March 2006

6 remaining girls get a meeting with the dietitian and fitness instructor who tell Mimi and Niral that they have decreased in volume. In order to cleanse the mental systems, the girls are given a body and soul lesson. Alicia cries when the emotions float. The girls later arrive at the boxing arena for their photoshoot. The girls are divided into pairs, and they been photographed without makeup and hair styling in a boxing battle, just showing real emotions while moving. Niral, who decided that they would not give up and give 110 percent of herself, rages on the scene. She wins Mimi in a knockout. Mimi confronts her and tells her that the blows were beyond the mission, Alisia and Michelle do not have much love on the set either.

Later, the girls have their next photoshoot where they have to be topless in the boudoir, make Niral and Mimi having difficulties. Among the girls are two new groups: one includes Mimi, Alicia and Christin, and the other includes Keren, Michelle and Niral. Mimi talks about the fear that the girls will actually lift her up and her lack of connection with the other group. At the judging room, Galit announced that the top 5 will be going to Milan. Keren & Christin are the worst of the week, and the episode end in cliffhanger.

- Immune from elimination: Alisia Estrin
- Bottom two: Christin Fridman & Keren Goltz

=== Episode 10 ===
Original airdate: 22 March 2006

On the last episode, Keren & Christin are in the bottom 2, and Keren was eliminated. Five girls were left to go to the fashion capital Milan. When the girls arrived, they are picked up by a magnificent limousine, and in the snow, Alicia feels she has returned home. The girls are going to meeting in one of Europe's leading agencies to test their international potential and they meet Alexandra, the agency's chief. Niral impresses her very much and says she has potential to work abroad. Mimi has a hard time with the English language, but Alexandra is impressed by her look and says she can lead cosmetics campaigns all over the world. Alexandra gives the girls instructions on what is permitted and what is forbidden to do in Milan and the city's map, which she will sends them to go-see for pasta advertising.

After they arrive at their suite, they receive warm regards from the home through exciting tapes in which the family tells a little about the contestants. In the evening, the girls go out to dinner with some male models. Niral met Eddie and the evening ended by taking her to a suite. On the next morning, the girls have to go by themselves to the audition. They are being auditioned for a pasta commercial, when they have to play and say a sentence in Italian against a crazy Italian director. Niral, who is asked to have a sexy look, was excellent and Alicia does it too. At the judging room, for the first time, they will vote for the contestant who they want to leave the competition.

- Eliminated: Keren Goltz
- Immune from elimination: Niral Karantinaji

=== Episode 11 ===
Original airdate: 29 March 2006

On the last episode, the remaining 5 girls had to vote for who should leave the competition. And with 3 votes, Michelle was voted out from the competition. Later, the girls had a challenge as they put up flyers with their photos and the people on the street had to choose the prettiest one. Niral whose picture gets the most takes and won the challenge. They later have a day with Moran Atias for a shopping spree and went out in a club in Milan.

The next day, the girls have their next photoshoot in lingerie. At the judging room, Niral had a breakdown when all of the girls nominated her to meet the judges for the fourth time. At the end, it was Christin who were forced to leave the competition, making Alisia, Mimi & Niral the finalist.

- Eliminated outside of judging panel: Michelle Lourie
- Bottom two: Christin Fridman & Niral Karantinaji
- Eliminated: Christin Fridman

=== Episode 12 ===
Original airdate: 5 April 2006

- Return: Natali Sabag & Christin Fridman
- Final five: Alisia Estrin, Christin Fridman, Mimi Tadesa, Natali Sabag & Niral Karantinaji
- HaDugmaniot: Niral Karantinaji

=== Episode 13 ===
Original airdate: 26 April 2006

This episode shows behind the scene of the finale and what Niral is doing on the day after winning the competition.

== Results table ==
Place	Model	Episodes										
Place	Model	1 (Note: In Episode 1, Hila was called 7th but was eliminated.)	2	3	4	5	6 (Note: In Episode 6, Mor was called 5th but was eliminated.) (Note: Episode 7 was a recap episode.)	8	9 (Note: The episode 9 ended with a cliffhanger where Christin and Keren were in bottom-two. The final result was shown the next episode.)	10 (Note: In Episode 10, the five remaining girls had to vote who they wanted to eliminate from the competition. The episode ended with a cliffhanger and the final verdict was shown the next episode.)	11 (Note: In the beginning of Episode 11, Michelle was eliminated with 3 votes.)	12 (Note: In Episode 12, Christin and Natali were voted back into the competition.)
1	Niral	LOW	IMM	SAFE	SAFE	SAFE	LOW	SAFE	SAFE	IMM	LOW	WINNER
2	Natali	SAFE	SAFE	SAFE	IMM	SAFE	SAFE	OUT				OUT
3	Mimi	SAFE	LOW	SAFE	SAFE	SAFE	SAFE	IMM	SAFE	SAFE	SAFE	OUT
5-4	Alisia	SAFE	SAFE	IMM	SAFE	SAFE	LOW	SAFE	IMM	SAFE	SAFE	OUT
5-4	Christin	SAFE	SAFE	SAFE	SAFE	IMM	SAFE	SAFE	LOW	LOW	OUT	OUT
6	Michelle	SAFE	SAFE	SAFE	SAFE	SAFE	IMM	LOW	SAFE	OUT		
7	Keren	SAFE	IMM	SAFE	IMM	LOW	SAFE	SAFE	OUT			
8	Mor	SAFE	SAFE	LOW	SAFE	SAFE	OUT					
9	Sharon	IMM	SAFE	SAFE	LOW	OUT						
10	Ira	SAFE	SAFE	SAFE	OUT							
11	Naomi	SAFE	SAFE	OUT								
12	Polly	SAFE	OUT									
14-13	Liat	OUT										
14-13	Hila	OUT										

The contestant was immune from elimination
The contestant was in danger of elimination
The contestant was eliminated outside of judging panel
The contestant was eliminated
The contestant won the competition

=== Photo shoots ===
- Episode 1 photo shoot: Metallic swimwear in ice
- Episode 2 runway: Zombie runway
- Episode 3 photo shoot: Makeovers with topless men
- Episode 4 photo shoot: Celebrity at a party
- Episode 5 photo shoot: Fairies in groups at a dark forest
- Episode 6 challenge: Interview with Micki Buganim
- Episode 8 photo shoot: Posing in the pool and underwater
- Episode 9 photo shoots: B&W boxing in pair; Topless in pair
- Episode 10 challenge: Mock auditioned for a pasta commercial
- Episode 11 photo shoot: Lingerie
- Episode 12 photo shoot: Superheroes hanging in the city skyline

== Ratings ==
Episode Viewing figures from Ynet

No. in series	No. in season	Episode	Air date	Ratings	Viewers (in thousands)	Rank		Source
No. in series	No. in season	Episode	Air date	Ratings	Viewers (in thousands)	Daily	Weekly	Source
16	1	"Chapter 1"	11 January 2006	11%	228.010	#6	#34	
17	2	"Chapter 2"	18 January 2006	11.2%	221.000	#7	#31	
18	3	"Chapter 3"	25 January 2006	10.5%	214.000	#9	#35	
19	4	"Chapter 4"	1 February 2006	11.5%	280.000	#4	#24	
20	5	"Chapter 5"	8 February 2006	13%	301.000	#5	#22	
21	6	"Chapter 6"	15 February 2006	14.3%	355.000	#4	#15	
22	7	"Uncensored"	22 February 2006	5.4%	117.000	#10	#50	
23	8	"Chapter 7"	8 March 2006	11.3%	—N/a	#5	—N/a	
24	9	"Chapter 8"	15 March 2006	10.4%	—N/a	#6	—N/a	
25	10	"Chapter 9"	22 March 2006	12.1%	—N/a	#3	—N/a	
26	11	"Chapter 10"	29 March 2006	11.8%	288.000	#3	#19	
27	12	"The Final"	5 April 2006	14.3%	313.000	#2	#19	
28	13	"The Day After"	26 April 2006	5.2%	—N/a	#14	—N/a	
