= Amelia Hayes =

Amelia Hayes may refer to:

- Amelia Hayes, owner of Look (modeling agency)
- Amelia Hayes, fictional character in Intelligence (U.S. TV series)
