= HaDugmaniyot season 3 =

HaDugmaniyot
- Season 3
- season 3's cast
- No. of episodes: 14

Release
- Original network: Channel 10
- Original release: February 8 – April 22, 2008

Season chronology
- ← Previous; Season 2

Season three of HaDugmaniot aired from February 2, 2008, to April 22, 2008, on Channel 10 and saw 12 girls compete for the title of the new Israeli Top Model. Once again hosted by Galit Gutman, the season contained 14 episodes (including a recap and a best-of episode).

In Episode 1, 18 semifinalists were invited to the models' house in Tel Aviv where at the end of the Episode the 12 finalists were determined when they received a necklace which indicated their permission to be in the competition. After a girl was sent home, she had to return this necklace.

The international destination of the season was once again Paris, to where Gutman already took the girls from Season 1. After the original top 3 was chosen, the nine prior eliminated girls received another chance to compete in the final when all of them were brought back in Episode 12. At the end of that episode, all twelve girls voted for which girl they wanted to be in the final. Tslil Sela, previously eliminated by her fellow competitors, then received the most votes. The wildcard from the judges was given to Rita Os, originally eliminated in sixth place in front of the Eiffel Tower.

The two joined Ella Mashkautzen, Sasha Taptikov and Natali Dadon in the live final where the audience voted Ella the winner of the season.

== Contestants ==
(ages stated are at start of contest)

Semi-finalists

Name	Age	Height	Hometown	Finish	Place
Alex Edri	22	1.67 m (5 ft 5 1/2 in)	Ashdod	Episode 1	18-13
Gal Abarbanel	20	1.70 m (5 ft 7 in)	Modi'in-Maccabim-Re'ut	Episode 1	18-13
Lili Levi	20	1.74 m (5 ft 8 1/2 in)	Ramat Yishai	Episode 1	18-13
Maria Rozenfeld	21	1.75 m (5 ft 9 in)	Jaffa	Episode 1	18-13
Miri Grinberg	18	1.77 m (5 ft 9 1/2 in)	Carmiel	Episode 1	18-13
Reut Doron	20	1.75 m (5 ft 9 in)	Petah Tikva	Episode 1	18-13

Finalists

Contestant	Age	Height	Hometown	Finish	Place
Shira 'Shir' Azran	17	1.73 m (5 ft 8 in)	Eilat	Episode 2	12
Alina Raifa	19	1.72 m (5 ft 7 1/2 in)	Tel Aviv	Episode 3	11
Anastasia Bokanova	24	1.74 m (5 ft 8 1/2 in)	Tel Aviv	Episode 4	10
Limor Eliyahu	22	1.76 m (5 ft 9 1/2 in)	Tiberias	Episode 5	9
Liliana Sotnikov	23	1.70 m (5 ft 7 in)	Tel Aviv	Episode 6	8
Karina 'Karin' Cohen	20	1.68 m (5 ft 6 in)	Afula	Episode 7	7
Katerina 'Katya' Gur	18	1.72 m (5 ft 7 1/2 in)	Ashdod	Episode 11	6
Tslil Sela	20	1.70 m (5 ft 7 in)	Herzlia	Episode 13	5-4
Natali Dadon	24	1.79 m (5 ft 10 1/2 in)	Kiryat Bialik	Episode 13	5-4
Rita Os	18	1.75 m (5 ft 9 in)	Afula	Episode 13	3-2
Aleksandra 'Sasha' Taptikov	19	1.67 m (5 ft 5 1/2 in)	Bat Yam	Episode 13	3-2
Ella Mashkautzen	21	1.73 m (5 ft 8 in)	Bat Yam	Episode 13	1

=== Judges ===
- Galit Gutman
- Miki Buganim
- Elimor Zilberman
- Seffi Shakked
- Stella Amar

== Summaries ==
=== Results table ===
Place	Model	Episodes											
Place	Model	2	3	4 (Note: In Episode 4, Ana was called 7th but was eliminated.)	5	6	7 (Note: In Episode 7, Karin was called 5th but was eliminated.)	8 (Note: Episode 8 featured a non elimination bottom-two.)	10 (Note: In Episode 10, the five remaining girls had to vote who they wanted to eliminate from the competition. The episode ended with a cliffhanger where Katya and Tslil both had two votes. The final verdict was shown the next episode.)		11 (Note: In the beginning of Episode 11, Natali cast the fifth vote which eliminated Tslil.)	13 (Note: In Episode 13, Tslil and Rita were voted back by the remaining girls in the competition.)	
1	Ella	SAFE	IMM	LOW	SAFE	LOW	SAFE	SAFE	SAFE	SAFE	LOW	SAFE	WIN
2	Sasha	SAFE	SAFE	SAFE	SAFE	SAFE	IMM	LOW	SAFE	SAFE	IMM	SAFE	OUT
3	Rita	SAFE	SAFE	SAFE	SAFE	IMM	SAFE	LOW	OUT			SAFE	OUT
5-4	Natali	SAFE	LOW	IMM	IMM	SAFE	SAFE	SAFE	SAFE	SAFE	SAFE	OUT	
5-4	Tslil	SAFE	SAFE	LOW	SAFE	SAFE	LOW	SAFE	LOW	OUT		OUT	
6	Katya	SAFE	SAFE	SAFE	SAFE	SAFE	LOW	SAFE	SAFE	LOW	OUT		
7	Karin	LOW	SAFE	SAFE	LOW	SAFE	OUT						
8	Liliana	SAFE	SAFE	SAFE	SAFE	OUT							
9	Limor	IMM	SAFE	LOW	OUT								
10	Anastasia	SAFE	SAFE	OUT									
11	Alina	SAFE	OUT										
12	Shir	OUT											

The contestant was immune from elimination
The contestant was in danger of elimination
The contestant was eliminated outside of judging panel
The contestant was eliminated
The contestant won the competition

=== Challenges ===
- Episode 1 photo shoots: Polaroids; Metallic style outfit in group (casting)
- Episode 2 photo shoot: Party animals in a nightclub
- Episode 3 photo shoot: Underwater beauty shots with a hat
- Episode 4 photo shoot: Car accident scenes
- Episode 5 runway: In Lilach Krystal's design at the firehouse
- Episode 6 commercial: Anti-Anorexia
- Episode 7 photo shoot: Bikinis on the beach; Gothic brides
- Episode 8 photo shoot: Detained at the airport
- Episode 10 challenge & photo shoot: Go-see; Fashion burglars
- Episode 11 challenge: Casting at Next Model Management in Paris
- Episode 13 motion editorial & photo shoot: Action soldiers; Posing nude with mannequins

== Ratings ==
Episode	Date	Viewers Percent	Ynet Ranking
1	8 February 2008	9.7%	
2	15 February 2008	9%	
3	22 February 2008	10.3%	
4	29 February 2008	7.2%	
5	7 March 2008	9.6%	
6	14 March 2008	9.1%	
7	21 March 2008	8.9%	
8	28 March 2008	8.2%	
9	5 April 2008	7.4%	
10	7 April 2008	9.1%	5
11	11 April 2008	8.3%	
12	14 April 2008	8.2%	7
13	15 April 2008	11.9%	5
