= Rokdim Im Kokhavim =

- Developed by: BBC
- Presented by: Current; Lucy Ayoub (season 8–present); Former; Avi Kushnir (season 1–6); Hilla Nachshon (season 1–6); Guy Zu-Aretz (season 7); Yarden Harel (season 7)
- Judges: Current; Eli Mizrahi (season 1–present); Anna Aronov (season 8–present); David Dvir (season 8–present); Haim Pershtein (season 12–present); Former: Gavri Levi (season 1–2, 4–5); Dana Parnes (season 5); Amir Fryszer Guttman (season 5); Claude Dadia (season 1–4, 6); Gaby Aldor (season 1–2); Sally-Anne Friedland (season 3); Yossi Yungman (season 3); Ilanit Tadmor (season 4); Hanna Laslo (season 6); Uri Paster (season 7); Michal Amdurski (season 7); Rona-Lee Shimon (season 8–9); Lea Yanai (season 10–11)
- Country of origin: Israel
- No. of seasons: 12

Production
- Running time: approx 60 minutes (not including commercials)

Original release
- Network: Channel 2 (season 1–7); Channel 12 (season 8–present)
- Release: 2005 – present

Rokdim Im Kokhavim (Hebrew: רוקדים עם כוכבים, "Dancing with Stars") is the Israeli version of the British reality TV competition Strictly Come Dancing and is part of the Dancing with the Stars franchise. The show features local celebrities partnered with professional ballroom dancers, competing to be the most successful dancers in the contest. Each week, the couple that gains the fewest votes from the show's judges and spectators is eliminated. Viewers vote for their favorites, to save them from elimination, via phone, SMS and online. Over 350,000 votes were cast on the show's 3rd-season finale.

== Participants ==
=== Season 1 (2005) ===
Celebrity	Professional	Position
Shiraz Tal (model)	Boris Zaltsman	1st Eliminated
Omer Barnea (actor)	Victoria Magalnik	2nd Eliminated
Avi Grainik (humorist)	Polina Chiktonov	3rd Eliminated
Becky Griffin (TV host)	Dani Yochtman	4th Eliminated
Eithan Urbach (swimmer)	Dorit Milman	5th Eliminated
Nitza Saul (actress)	Dennis Belochrekovski	Third
Sami Uri (actor)	Ana Aharonov	Second
Eliana Bakeer (actress)	Oron Dahan	Winners

=== Season 2 ===
Celebrity	Professional	Position
Pavlo Rosenberg (singer)	Polina Chiktonov	1st Eliminated
Shira Vilensky (actress)	Dennis Belochrekovski	2nd Eliminated
Riki Gal (singer)	Oron Dahan	3rd Eliminated
Shirley Buganim (model)	Kiril Sivolapov	4th Eliminated
Raz Meirman (model & TV presenter)	Mirit Kradoner	5th Eliminated
Limor Goldstein (actress)	Dani Yochtman	6th Eliminated
Limor Atias (actress)	Haim Pershtein	7th Eliminated
Pini Tabger (actor)	Dorit Milman	Third
Haim Revivo (footballer)	Ana Aharonov	Second
Guy Arieli (actor)	Masha Troyanski	Winners

=== Season 3 ===
Celebrity	Professional	Position
Michal Zoharetz (actress)	Haim Perstein	1st Eliminated
Yonathan Cohen (model)	Nataly Dricker	2nd Eliminated
Dana Dvorin (TV presenter)	Kiril Sivolapov	3rd Eliminated
Daniella Pick (singer)	Boris Zaltsman	4th Eliminated
Michael Hanegbi (actor, TV presenter)	Polina Chiktonov	5th Eliminated
Bonni Ginzburg (sports commentator)	Masha Troyanski	6th Eliminated
Alon Abutbul (actor)	Victoria Magalnik	7th Eliminated
Miki Kam (actress)	Yaniv Kakon	Third
Ilanit Levi (former beauty queen)	Dennis Belochrekovski	Second
Rodrigo Gonzales (TV star)	Naama Tavori	Winners

=== Season 4 ===
Celebrity	Professional	Position
Nadav Abuksis (actor)	Dorit Milman	1st Eliminated
Rotem Sela (model)	Yaniv Kakon	2nd Eliminated
Oren Smadja (judoka)	Polina Chiktonov	3rd Eliminated
Einat Erlich (TV star)	Oron Dahan	4th Eliminated
Lucy Dubinchik (actress)	Dennis Belochrekovski	Withdrew
Avi Cohen (footballer)	Mirit Kradoner	5th Eliminated
Zohar Liba (model, actor)	Anastasia Shapiro	6th Eliminated
Oded Paz (actor, comedian)	Viki Shupletsov	7th Eliminated
Sharon Wexler (weather forecaster)	Boris Zaltsman	8th Eliminated
Lior Miller (actor, model)	Ana Aharonov	Third
Vika Finkelstein (model, TV star)	Dani Yochtman	Second
Galit Giat (actress)	Kiril Sivolapov	Winners

Partners Lucy Dubinchik & Dennis Belochrekovski were forced to retire from the contest when Dennis suffered a herniated disk injury.

=== Season 5 ===
Celebrity	Professional	Position
Pnina Rosenblum (model, businesswoman)	Dennis Belochrekovski	1st Eliminated
Orly Weinerman (actress)	Haim Pershtein	2nd & 7th Eliminated
Meital Dohan (actress)	Victor Tsemah	3rd Eliminated
Gala Kogan (actress, model)	Oron Dahan	4th Eliminated
Liat Bello (model, TV star)	Yaniv Kakon	5th Eliminated
Zohar Strauss (actor)	Dorit Milman	6th Eliminated
Shimon Amsalem (basketball player)	Masha Troyansky	8th Eliminated
Mira Awad (actress, musician)	Dani Yochtman	9th Eliminated
Itzik Cohen (actor)	Alona Diskin	Third
Moshe Peretz (singer)	Polina Chiktonov	Second
Michael Lewis (actor, model)	Ana Aharonov	Winners

In a twist in the competition after the fifth elimination, viewers were able to vote to reinstate their favourite of the five couples that had been eliminated. Orly Weinerman won and was reinstated back into the contest, only to be re-eliminated by the public the following week. This twist created controversy, however, when it allegedly emerged that contestants Pnina Rosenblum, Meital Dohan and Gala Kogan had already confirmed they had no plans to return to the programme under any circumstances due to other commitments. Despite this, the phone lines to vote for the three contestants were kept open at the expense of those voting by SMS. The Network responded that they had "operated according to policy", and would not confirm or deny the allegations to respect the "dignity of the stars".

=== Season 6 ===
Celebrity	Professional	Position
Sharon Haziz (singer)	Yaniv Kakon	1st Eliminated
Itzik Zohar (former international footballer)	Alona Diskin	2nd Eliminated
Hila Alfert (actress, journalist)	Haim Pershtein	3rd Eliminated
Aki Avni (actor, TV Host)	Polina Chiktonov	4th Eliminated
Gili Shem Tov (sports presenter)	Dorit Milman	5th Eliminated
Tal Berkovich (model)	Boris Zaltzman	6th Eliminated
Kobi Peretz (singer)	Rina Greenspan	7th Eliminated
Merhav Mohar (boxer)	Anastasia Shapiro	8th Eliminated
Dalia Mazor (newsreader)	Dani Yochtman	9th Eliminated
Adi Himelbloy (actress, model)	Dennis Belochrekovski	Third
Ron Shahar (actor)	Ana Aharonov	Second
Shlomi Koriat (actor, comedian)	Hadas Fisher	Winners

=== Season 7 ===
Celebrity	Professional	Position
Gil Mossinson (basketball player)	Anastasia Shapiro	1st Eliminated
Shlomo Bar-Aba (actor, comedian)	Polina Chiktonov	2nd Eliminated
Dana Adini (actress, singer)	Anton Lapidos	3rd Eliminated
Noaa Meiman (director, actress)	Dani Yochtman	4th Eliminated
Avihu Shabat (singer)	Elina Shoostin	5th Eliminated
Ilanit (singer)	Haim Pershtein	Withdrew
Shlomi Lahiani (mayor of Bat Yam)	Rina Greenspan	6th Eliminated
Orna Datz (singer)	Yaniv Kakon	7th/8th Eliminated
Yuval Shem Tov (children star)	Viki Shupletsov	7th/8th Eliminated
Esti Zakhaim (actress)	Boris Zaltzman	9th Eliminated
Amit Farkash (actress)	Oron Dahan	Third
Miki Geva (comedian)	Yulya Prokofenko	Second
Asaf Hertz (actor)	Masha Troyansky	Winners

Partners Ilanit & Haim Pershtein were forced to retire from the contest when Ilanit had a problem with her leg.

=== Season 8 ===
Celebrity	Professional	Position
Estella (chef, baker, chocolatier)	Sergei Stefanov	1st Eliminated
Yuval Segal (actor)	Karin Sorochinski	2nd Eliminated
Eli Ildis (sport commentator)	Alona Diskin	3rd Eliminated
Idit Matot (professor, anaesthesiologist)	Dani Yochtman	4th Eliminated
Liran Danino (singer)	Julia Shachar	5th Eliminated
Omer Dror (actor, model)	Sana Sokol	6th Eliminated
Sendi Bar (actress, model)	Rafael Fleischmann	8th Eliminated
Bar Zomer (model)	Matanel Konevsky	Withdrew
Rotem Cohen (singer)	Michelle Ryaboy	9th Eliminated
Eden Fines (model)	Orel Kalf	10th Eliminated
Orel Tzabari (comedian)	Lital Lechtman Cohen	11th Eliminated
Moshe Ashkenazi (actor, comedian)	Jenia Leibman	7th & 12th Eliminated
Yael Bar Zohar (actress, TV hostess, model)	Anton Lapidos	13th Eliminated
Maayan Adam (hostess)	Artem Liaskovski	Third
Adi Ashkenazi (comedian)	Haim Pershtein	Second
Alex Shatilov (artistic gymnast)	Nina Solovyov	Winners

Partners Bar Zomer & Matanel Kovansky were forced to retire from the contest due to Bar's injury.

=== Season 9 ===
Celebrity	Professional	Position
Barak Shamir (model)	Alissa Shriki	1st Eliminated
Shai Gal (journalist)	Romy Nof	2nd Eliminated
Didi Harari (radio broadcaster)	Karin Sorochinski	3rd Eliminated
Narkis (singer)	Michelle Ryaboy	4th Eliminated
Orly Levy-Abekasis (politician, former Knesset member)	Alon Davidovski	5th Eliminated
Yasmin Lukatz (entrepreneur, investress)	Dani Yochtman	6th Eliminated
Kobi Maimon (comedian)	Lital Lechtman Cohen	7th Eliminated
Nibar Madar (model)	Lotem Madmoni	8th Eliminated
Nasrin Kadri (singer)	Rafael Fleischmann	Withdrew
Ofer Shechter (actor, comedian)	Sana Sokol	11th Eliminated
Dana Grotski (TV hostess)	Ilia Eli Gokhman; Rafael Fleischmann	9th & 12th Eliminated
Doron Ben-David (actor)	Jenia Leibman	13th Eliminated
Ella-Lee Lahav (singer)	Matanel Konevsky	14th Eliminated
Yogev Malka (sport climber, model)	Julia Shachar	10th & 15th Eliminated
Kim Or Azulay (actress, model)	Idan Atias	16th Eliminated
Lee Biran (singer, actor)	Nina Solovyov	Third
Gaya Be'er Gurevich (actress, comedian)	Haim Pershtein	Second
Adi Havshush (actress)	Artem Liaskovski; Matanel Konevsky	Winners

Dana's partner Ilia withdrew from the competition for personal reasons and was replaced by Sergei Volkov as Dana's partner after her return to the competition. However, Nasrin and Sergei were forced to retire from the contest when they had a severe injury, and therefore, Rafael, Nasrin's partner, became Dana's official new partner.

Adi's partner Artem was forced to retire from the contest when he had a severe injury only one night before the second semi-final. Matanel, Ella-Lee's partner, was hired to become Adi's official new partner.

=== Season 10 ===
Celebrity	Professional	Position
Valerie Hamaty (singer)	Roy Gurevich	1st Eliminated
Yana Yoseph (actress, model)	Haim Pershtein	2nd Eliminated
Geula Even-Saar (journalist)	Nadav Shacham	3rd Eliminated
Hezi Dean (mentalist, magician)	Inbar Lubelski	4th Eliminated
Ori Sasson (judoka)	Michal Itelman	5th Eliminated
Danit Greenberg (blogger)	Idan Atias	7th Eliminated
Izhar Cohen (singer)	Polina Chiktonov	8th Eliminated
Shlomi Tapiero (actor)	Nina Solovyov	9th Eliminated
Liraz Charhi (actress)	Artem Liaskovski	10th Eliminated
Avi Aburomi (singer, actor)	Lital Lechtman Cohen	11th Eliminated
On Refaeli (model, actor)	Yana Dobrovski	Withdrew
Netta Barzilai (singer)	Alon Davidovski	13th Eliminated
Yarden Gerbi (judoka, TV hostess)	Dani Yochtman	14th Eliminated
Elisha Banai (singer, musician)	Jenia Leibman	6th & 15th Eliminated
Romi Frenkel (model)	Eitan Krips	16th Eliminated
Danielle Gal (actress)	Adir Blumenfeld	17th Eliminated
Mariano Idelman (comedian)	Romy Nof	18th Eliminated
Tal Morad (model, actor)	Sana Sokol	Fourth
Linoy Ashram (olympian, rhythmic gymnast)	Rafael Fleischmann	Third
Maya Keyy (model)	Lotem Madmoni	Second
Dor Harari (actor, singer)	Julia Shachar	Winners

=== Season 11 ===
Celebrity	Professional	Position
Iris Kol (Radio personality and Television presenter)	Dani Yochtman	1st Eliminated
Yiftach Ramon (model)	Lital Lechtman Cohen	2nd Eliminated
Idan Alterman (actor and comedian)	Jenia Leibman	3rd Eliminated
Imry Biton (actor)	Yana Dobrobski	Withdrew
Eden Saban (actress and model)	Leon Konbisar	5th Eliminated
Ester Rada (actress and singer)	Alon Davidovski	6th Eliminated
Sigal Shachmon (Television presenter and actress)	Sergei Stefanov	7th Eliminated
Roslana Rodina (model and actress)	Adam Rephaelov	8th Eliminated
Shai Avivi (actor and TV presenter)	Alissa Shriki	9th Eliminated
Alona Saar (actress)	Eitan Krips	10th Eliminated
Omer Nodelman (actress and model)	Matanel Konevsky	Withdrew
Moran Samuel (paralympic player)	Shon Ziv	13th Eliminated
Ben Yossipovich (actor)	Polina Chiktonov	11th & 14th Eliminated
Ben Zini (actor and singer)	Julia Shachar	15th Eliminated
Taylor Malkov (actress and singer)	Haim Pershtein	16th Eliminated
Peter Paltchik (judoka)	Diana Kandelis	17th Eliminated
Shahar Tavoch (actor and singer)	Romy Nof	18th Eliminated
Karin Alia (model)	Orel Kalf	Fourth
Roni Daloomi (actress and singer)	Lotem Madmoni	Third
Sagi Muki (judoka)	Nina Solovyov	Second
Amir Shurush (actor and comedian)	Sana Sokol	Winners

Partners Imry Biton & Yana Dobrobski were forced to retire from the contest due to Imry's injury.

Partners Omer Nodelman & Matanel Konevsky were forced to retire from the contest due to Omer's injury.

=== Season 12 ===
Celebrity	Professional	Position
Bat-Hen Sabag (actress)	Idan Atias	1st Eliminated
Tom Aviv (chef)	Yana Dobrobski	2nd Eliminated
Frida Uziel (singer)	Boris Danisov	3rd Eliminated
Danielle Greenberg (model)	Alon Davidovski	4th Eliminated
Shahar Hauon (actress and Model)	Matanel Konevsky	Withdrew
Shaily Shindler (Television presenter)	Nadav Shacham	6th Eliminated
Ori Pfeffer (actor)	Alissa Shriki	7th Eliminated
Guy Hochman (comedian)	Nicole Rogovin	9th Eliminated
Mali Levi (actress and model)	Dani Yochtman	11th Eliminated
Matan Peretz (comedian)	Elinor Gershfeld	12th Eliminated
Nathaniel Buzolic (Australian actor)	Julia Shachar	13th Eliminated
Eden Golan (singer)	Artem Liaskovski	Withdrew
Maya Dagan (actress)	Shahar Zismanovich	10th & 15th Eliminated
Dian Schwartz (model)	Lotem Madmoni	16th Eliminated
Avishag Semberg (Olympic taekwondo athlete)	Ivan Danisov	17th Eliminated
Sheran Yeini (former professional footballer)	Karin Sorochinski	8th & 18th Eliminated
Tzachi Halevy (actor and singer)	Nina Solovyov	19th Eliminated
Bar Brimer (actor and model)	Sana Sokol	Fourth
Shiri Maimon (singer and actress)	Rafael Fleischmann	Third
Noa Cohen (actress and model)	Eitan Krips	Second
Amir Banai (actor)	Romy Nof	Winners

Partners Shahar Hauon & Matanel Konevsky were forced to retire from the contest due to Shahar's injury.

Partners Eden Golan & Artem Liaskovski were forced to retire from the contest due to Eden's injury.

== See also ==
- Dancing with the Stars
