= Golden Screen Award =

Golden Screen Award may refer to:

- Goldene Leinwand, a German film certification for film ticket sales,
- Golden Screen Award (Canada), a Canadian film award presented to the year's top-grossing Canadian film.
- Israeli Golden Screen Award, an Israeli television award between 1994 and 2005 by Pnai Plus magazine.
