= Ziv Koren =

Israeli photographer

- זיו קורן
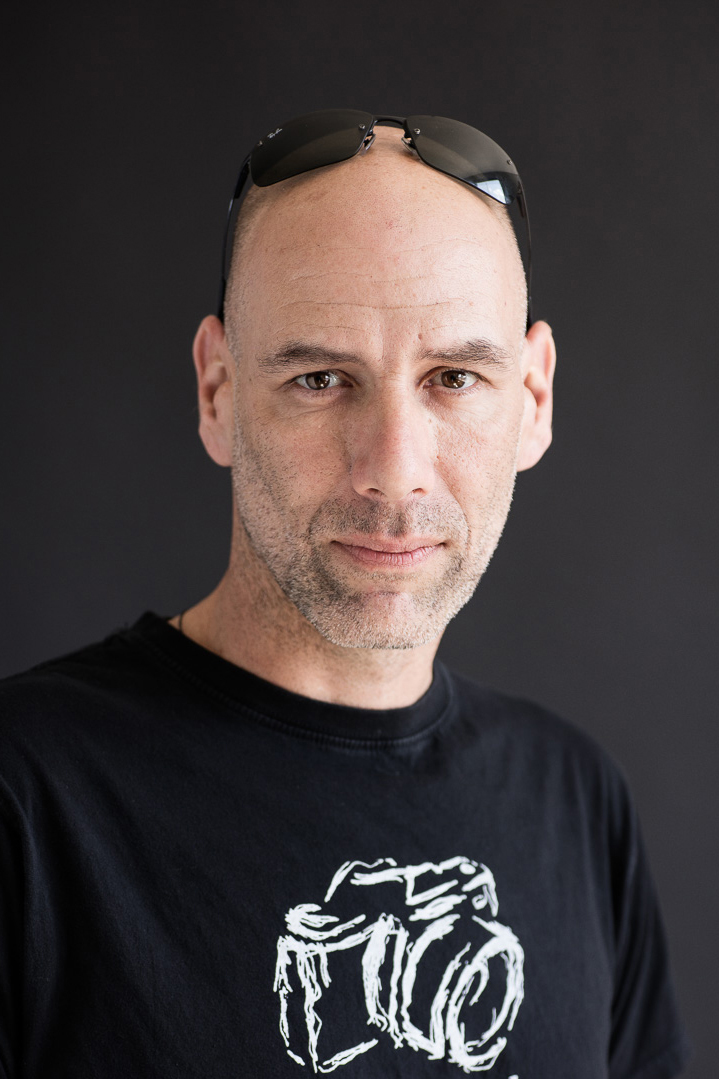
- Born: July 13, 1970 (age 56); Ramat Gan, Israel
- Citizenship: Israel
- Occupation: Photojournalist
- Website: zivkoren-writingwithlight.com

Ziv Koren (Hebrew: זיו קורן; born July 13, 1970) is an Israeli photojournalist, a representative of "Polaris Images" photo agency. Koren is most noted for documenting the Israeli–Palestinian conflict, IDF operations, and the IDF special forces units "Shayetet 13", "Duvdevan", "YAMAM", and "Sayeret Matkal".

== Biography ==
Ziv Koren began his career as a photographer in the Israeli army. Koren was in a relationship with Israeli fashion model Galit Gutmann. They have two daughters.

== Photography career ==
Koren's main interest are humanitarian issues which are often the subject of his documentary projects such as the Israeli-Palestinian conflict, poverty, the tsunami, Guantanamo Prison, the Haiti earthquake, AIDS in South Africa and festivals in India, to name a few.

In addition, he has documented the Israeli Defense Forces for more than two decades including military operations such as the withdrawal from the Gaza Strip, the Second Lebanese War, military operations "Cast Lead", "Pillar of Cloud", "Protective Edge" and others.

His photographs have appeared in solo and group exhibitions worldwide at the Metropolitan Museum of Tokyo, the Memorial Museum in Spain, and the War Museum in Croatia, in the project 'War/Photography: Images of Armed Conflict and Its Aftermath", at the Museum of Fine Arts, Houston. They have been published in Time Magazine, Newsweek, The Sunday Times Magazine, Stern, Der Spiegel, Paris Match, Le Figaro, Corriere Della Sera Magazine, Wired Magazine and more.

Koren's image of an exploded Israeli bus (1995), was selected in year 2000 as one of the 200 most important images in the last 45 years by The World Press Photo organization, besides which he is the recipient of numerous awards such as the "Photo District News Award "(four times), "Yann Geffroy Award", "International Color Award" (twice) and " POYi - Picture of the Year International " (twice).

Koren was the subject of the documentary film "More than 1000 words" (directed by Solo Avital) which was screened in film festivals and won festival awards.

== Awards ==
- 1995: Spot News - Honorable Mention for "Bombed Bus #5 from "World Press Photo", Netherlands.
- 1997: Top documentary projects carried out during 1997 for "Jessica File" from "Graphis", USA.
- 2000: 1 of 200 best pictures in the last 45 years from "World Press Photo", Netherlands.
- 2003: 1st prize–portraits, 1st prize–stories from "Local Testimony", Israel.
- 2003: 3rd prize–spot news (single) from "Picture of the Year" (POYi), USA.
- 2004: Best documentary project for "Louai Mer'i, a sergeant, is going home from "Photo District News" (PDN) Award, USA.
- 2004: 1st prize–nature & environment" from "Local Testimony", Israel.
- 2004: 1st Place for Excellence in Photography (Magazine Division) for "Last Look: A new Leash on Life" from Simon Rockower Award, USA.
- 2005: Award for "Louai Mer'i, a sergeant, is going home" from Luis Valtuena International Humanitarian Photography, Spain.
- 2005: 1st prize–portraiture, 2nd prize–daily Life, 2nd prize-news" from "Local Testimony", Israel.
- 2006: Photojournalism 1st place - Outstanding Achievement from International Color Award, USA.
- 2007: Award of Excellence for Outstanding Achievement from Hadassah College, Israel.
- 2008: Best photo book for "More than 1000 words" from "Photo District News" (PDN) Award, USA.
- 2009: Photojournalism Honorable Mention in International Color Award, USA.
- 2009: 1st prize – news, 2nd prize – politics, 3rd prize – portraiture from "Local Testimony", Israel.
- 2010: Best photo story for "YAMAM" from "Photo District News" (PDN) Award, USA.
- 2010: 3rd prize-daily life from "Local Testimony", Israel.
- 2011: 1st prize-portraits, 2nd prize-news from "Local Testimony", Israel.
- 2012: 2nd prize-daily Life from "Local Testimony", Israel.
- 2013: 1st prize-Art & Culture from "Local Testimony", Israel.
- 2015: Best photo book for "Writing With Light" from "Photo District News" (PDN) Award, USA.
- 2016: Best photo book for "Writing With Light" from Rendez-vous Image Award, France.
- 2016: Finalist of Best Photography Book Award for "Writing With Light" from Picture of the Year International (POYi).

== Solo exhibitions ==
- "Jessica File", Museum of Israeli Art – Ramat Gan, Israel (1999).
- "Louai Mer'i, a Sergeant, is Going Home" Museum of Israeli Art – Ramat Gan, Israel (2003); Artist Resident Tokyo – Tokyo, Japan (2004).
- "Shooting for the Truth", Palm Beach Photography Center – Palm Beach, USA (2006).
- "More Than 1000 Words", Cicero Gallery – Berlin, Germany (2007); Tokyo Metropolitan Museum – Tokyo, Japan. BankART Gallery – Yokohama, Japan (2008).
- "Tel Aviv Photographs", Presso lo Spazio Krizia – Milano, Italy (2009).
- "Brotherhood" project, touring exhibition in 6 main cities in the US (2010).
- "Aftershock", Tel Aviv historical train station, Israel (2010).
- "MILESTONES" Urban Gallery, Jaffa, Israel (2010).
- "Shalom Inshallah", SCSC, Stockholm, Sweden (2011).
- "Heartbeat" - Tel Aviv historical train station, Israel (2012).
- "Tel Aviv Moments"- Yokohama, Japan (2012); Riga, Latvia. and Saint Petersburg, Russia (2013).
- "Heartbeat" UN building – Geneva, Switzerland (2014).
- "Writing with Light" – B&W Exhibition - Tel Aviv, Israel (2014); National Gallery, Bangkok, Thailand. The Exhibition Center, Hanoi, Vietnam (2015); Deitta Gallery, Yangon, Myanmar (2016).

== Group exhibitions ==
- "World Press Photo" world traveling exhibition (1995).
- "Memorial Map" in memory of Yitzhak Rabin, Eretz Israel Museum – Tel Aviv, Israel (1997).
- F.I.A.P International, Rishon Le'Zion Arts Center – Rishon Le'Zion, Israel (1998).
- "Yitzhak Rabin", Einav Center – Tel-Aviv, Israel (1999).
- A Century of Photography in Israel", Israel Museum – Jerusalem, Israel (2000).
- "Israel" slide show, VISA Pour L'Image festival – Perpignan, France (2001).
- "Wandering Library", the 50th Biennale – Venice, Italy (2003).
- "Big Small Moments" on Shimon Peres, Holon Museum, curator – Holon, Israel (2003).
- "Local Testimony", Azrieli Towers – Tel Aviv, Israel (2003).
- "Sensitivity & Determination", International traveling exhibition – USA (2006).
- "Disengagement", Tel Aviv Museum – Tel Aviv, Israel (2006).
- "War Stricken Regions of the Mediterranean", Athens Photo Festival – Athens, Greece (2008).
- "Canon Ambassadors – Shooting for the Top", Gettyimages Gallery – London, UK (2009)
- Lianzhou International Photo Festival 2009 (LIPH09) - China (2009).
- War Photography- Museum of Fine Arts in Houston, USA (2012); The Brooklyn Museum of Art, USA (2014).
- Ethiopia's Ancient Salt Trade - MAXXI - National Museum of Arts in Rome, Italy (2015).

== Published works ==
- "Reality" – News photographs taken between 1993-1995 (1995).
- "Jessica files" – Russian immigrant stripper in Tel Aviv (1998).
- "Stones & flags" with Uri Lifshitz – The Israeli Palestinian conflict (2002).
- "Louai Mer'i, a Sergeant, is Going Home" – Wounded soldier coping with his injury (2003).
- "More Than 1000 Words" – Decade of conflict (2007).
- "Brotherhood" – the Israeli Defense Forces (2009).
- "YAMAM"- The Israeli Counter Terrorist Unit (2009).
- "Aftershock" – Aftermath of the Earthquake in Haiti (2010).
- "Milstones" - Collection of photographs from projects (2010).
- "Shalom Inshallah", Stockholm, Sweden (2011).
- "Positive+" AIDS in KwaZulu-Natal, South Africa (2011).
- "Heartbeat" – 20 years for Shneider Children's Hospital (2012).
- "Duvdevan"- IDF's Elite counter Terror Unit (2012).
- "Writing with Light" - B&W Vol I + Vol II (2014).
