= HaDugmaniot =

Israeli television series

- Genre: Reality television
- Created by: Tyra Banks
- Presented by: Galit Gutmann
- Judges: Galit Gutmann (1-3); Miki Buganim (1-3); Sefi Shaked (2-3); Stella Amar (3); Elimor Zilberman (1-3); Yael Reich (2); Betty Rockaway (1-2); Eshel Ezer (1); Shiraz Tal (1)
- Country of origin: Israel
- No. of episodes: 42

Production
- Running time: 80 minutes

Original release
- Network: Channel 10
- Release: 21 February 2005 – 22 April 2008

HaDugmaniot (Hebrew: הדוגמניות; English: The Models) is an Israeli reality documentary based on Tyra Banks' America's Next Top Model and is aired on Channel 10. The show pits contestants against each other in a variety of competitions to determine who will win a modelling contract and other prizes in hopes of a promising career start in the modeling industry.

== Judges ==
Judges	Seasons		
Judges	1 (2005)	2 (2006)	3 (2008)
Galit Gutmann	Main	Main	Main
Miki Buganim	Main	Main	Main
Elimor Zilberman	Main	Main	Main
Sefi Shaked		Main	Main
Stella Amar			Main
Yael Reich		Main	
Betty Rockaway	Main	Main	
Eshel Ezer	Main		
Shiraz Tal	Main		

== History ==
The show is hosted by Galit Gutmann, one of Israel's leading models. The biggest difference between HaDugmaniyot and ANTM is the live finale aired as the end of each season where the already eliminated contestants get voted back into the final. Season 1 contestant that was voted back was Evelin Piotrowska. Season 2 were Christin Fridman and Natali Sabag. Season 3 was Tslil Sela and Rita Os. Another difference is the audience choosing the winner of the show unlike in former eliminations, which are all based solely on the panel of judges' decision.

Arab-Israeli Niral Karantinaji won the second installment of the show. During the show, Karantinaji argued with a fellow competitor, Ethiopian-Israeli Mimi Tadesa, who called her "a terrorist." In the end, the audience choose Karantinaji as the winner of the series, while Tadesa achieved the second runner-up position.

== Cycles ==
Cycle	Premiere date	Winner	Runner-up	Other contestants in order of elimination	Number of contestants	International Destinations
1	21 February 2005	Victoria Katzman	Liat Bello	Alex Hazin & Daniela Perry & Raheli Takela & Sivan Marciano, Maya Tal, Angel Augusta, Adi Strod & Alexandra Sherman, Olga Lopatin, Meitar Amos, Ines Halif, Netta Karisi, Evelin Piotrowska, Liat Ben-Rashi	16	None
2	11 January 2006	Niral Karantinaji	Natali Sebag	Hila Chansky & Liat Fadlon, Polly Bandel, Naomi Zilber, Ira Simonov, Sharon Markovich, Mor Rimi, Keren Goltz, Michelle Lourie, Alisia Estrin & Christin Fridman, Mimi Tadesa	14	Milan
3	8 February 2008	Ella Mashkautzen	Rita Os & Sasha Taptikov	Shir Azran, Alina Reifa, Anastasia Bokanova, Limor Eliyahu, Liliana Sotnikov, Karin Cohen, Katya Gur, Tslil Sela & Natali Dadon	12	Paris; Antalya

== See also ==
- Israeli fashion
- Television in Israel
