= Asi Domb =

Israeli footballer and manager

Asi Domb אסי דומב
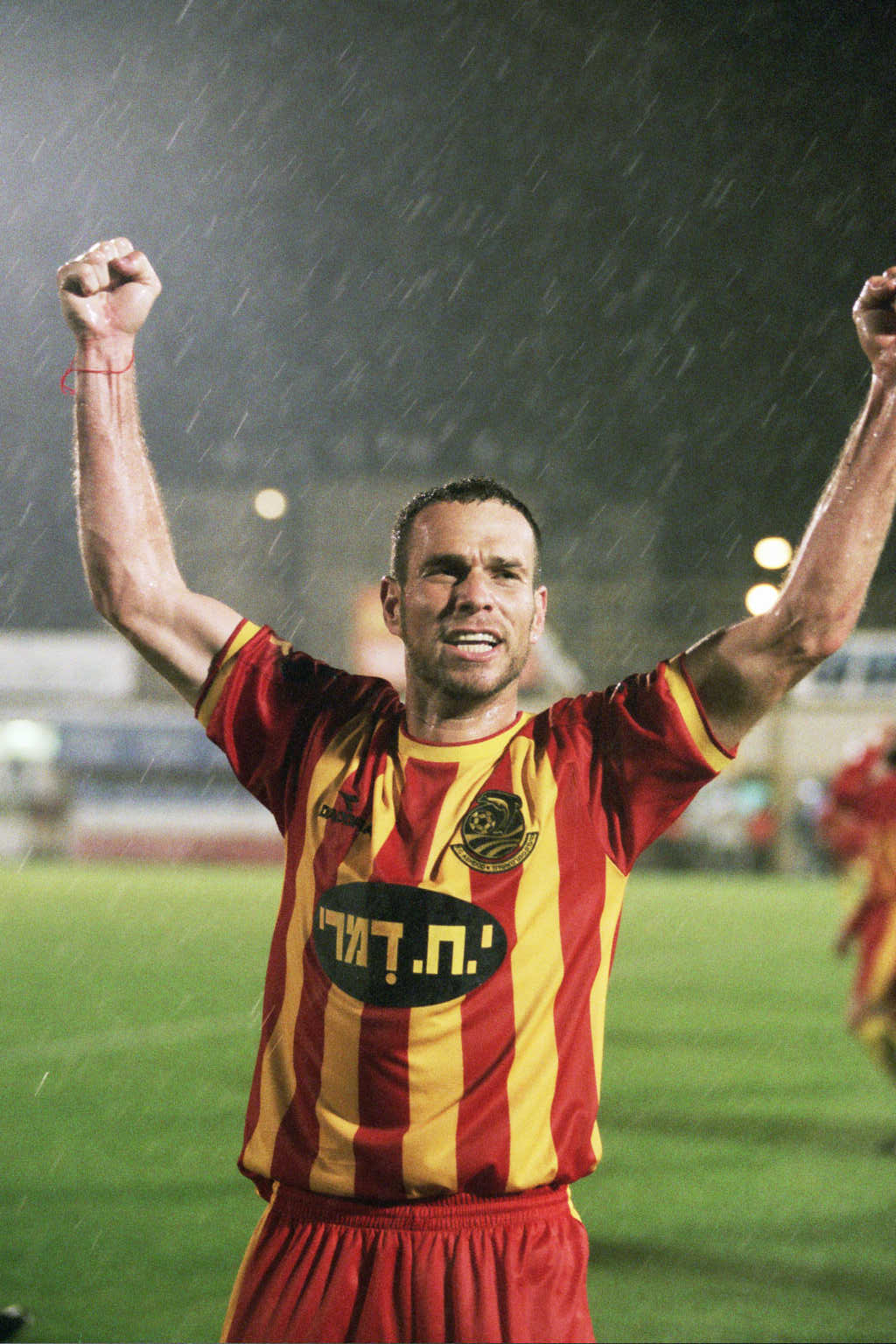

Personal information
- Full name: Assaf Domb
- Date of birth: February 27, 1974 (age 52)
- Place of birth: Netanya, Israel
- Position: Center back

Team information
- Current team: Hapoel Marmorek (manager)

Youth career
- Maccabi Netanya

Senior career*
Years	Team	Apps	(Gls)
1991–1996	Maccabi Netanya	110	(4)
1996–1997	Beitar Jerusalem	23	(0)
1997–1998	Hapoel Tel Aviv	26	(3)
1998–2000	Beitar Jerusalem	52	(4)
2000–2003	Hapoel Tel Aviv	74	(4)
2003–2004	F.C. Ashdod	28	(0)
2004–2006	Hapoel Tel Aviv	53	(4)
2006–2007	Bnei Yehuda	24	(1)
2007–2008	Hakoah Amidar Ramat Gan	30	(2)
2009–2010	Hapoel Ramat Gan	29	(0)

International career
1994–1995	Israel U21	7	(0)
1997–2002	Israel	3	(0)

Managerial career
- 2011–2012: Hapoel Kfar Saba (youth)
- 2012: Hapoel Kfar Saba
- 2013–2014: Hapoel Tel Aviv (assistant manager)
- 2014–2015: Hapoel Tel Aviv
- 2018–2019: Hapoel Marmorek
- 2019: Hapoel Bnei Lod
- 2019–: Hapoel Marmorek
- * Club domestic league appearances and goals

Assaf "Asi" Domb (Hebrew: אסי דומב; born 27 February 1974) is a retired Israeli footballer. Currently, he is a manager.

== Early and personal life ==
Assaf Domb was born in Netanya, Israel, to a Jewish family.

His first wife, out of three, was Israeli television host and model Hilla Nachshon. He has one child from his second marriage.

== Honours ==
- Israeli Premier League (1):
  - 1996–97
- Toto Cup (1):
  - 2001–02
- Israel State Cup (1):
  - 2006
- Liga Leumit (1):
  - 2007–08
