= Chava Mond =

Israeli model (born 1984)

Chava Mond חוה מונד
- Born: 1984 (age 40–41); Safed, Israel
- Occupation: Model
- Modeling information
- Height: 1.75 m / 5 ft 9 in
- Hair color: Dark Blond
- Eye color: Blue/Green
- Agency: Select, Elite

Chava Mond (Hebrew: חוה מונד; born 1984) is an Israeli model.

== Biography ==
Chava (Havi) Mond was born and raised in Safed to a religious Jewish family. She attended the city's religious girls' school. She hoped to study law and become an attorney, but at the age of 16 she was traveling in London with her aunt and was offered a job by a Select model agent. Mond refused, saying that she was religious and that she hadn't completed her high school studies, so Select waited until she turned 18, at which age Mond completed her national service.

She has been described as the first Israeli model to observe the Jewish Sabbath and keep kosher.

She holds joint Israeli and British citizenship, and lives in Hendon.

== Modelling career ==
Mond worked for French Connection, Calvin Klein, Ralph Lauren, The Times (on the cover and in an article), Cosmopolitan, In Style, Harvey Nichols Magazine and Marie Claire. Chava has also been on the catwalk for Chanel, Yves Saint Laurent and London Fashion Week and she has appeared in the advertising campaigns of Laura Ashley, French Connection and Gina Bakoni. As well, she is leading the 2004/5 winter campaign of Armani Jeans and the current, worldwide campaign for Pantene hair products.

Mond refuses to be photographed in swimsuits and underwear for religious reasons.

== See also ==
- Israeli fashion
- Esther Petrack – Jewish Orthodox model
