= Raz Meirman =

Israeli model (born 1977)

Raz Meirman (Hebrew: רז מאירמן; born August 15, 1977) is an Israeli model, best known as the former host of HaMerotz LaMillion, the Israeli version of the American reality show, The Amazing Race, which first aired on CBS in 2001.

Raz Meirman became famous in his young years. His first job was a model, and he was featured in worldwide pageants and contests. He also took part in Rokdim Im Kokhavim, the Israeli version of the Strictly Come Dancing / Dancing with the Stars franchise, and was eliminated before the season finale.

== See also ==
- Look (modeling agency)
