= Adi Ashkenazi =

Israeli actress and comedian

- עדי אשכנזי
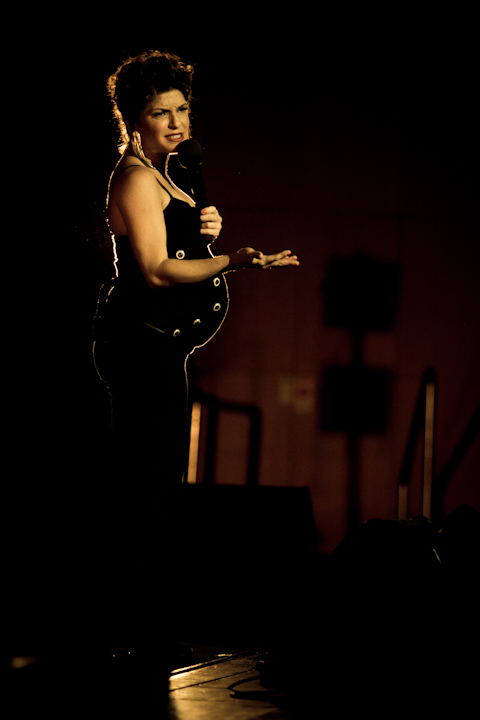
- Ashkenazi in 2011
- Born: 23 March 1975 (age 51); Herzliya, Israel
- Occupations: Actress; stand-up comedian; screenwriter; television presenter

Adi Ashkenazi (Hebrew: עדי אשכנזי; born 23 March 1975) is an Israeli actress, screenwriter, stand-up comedian and television presenter.

== Biography ==
Ashkenazi was born in Herzliya, Israel. Her Sephardic Jewish family immigrated to Israel from Turkey. She studied acting at the Beit Tzvi School for Performing Arts. In 2004, Ashkenazi divorced the actor Coby Doron after three years of marriage. In 2010, she was arrested for illegal possession of drugs, but released immediately. In 2010, it was announced that she was pregnant by her boyfriend of six months, Eitan Ben Zakan. She gave birth to a baby girl in April 2011 and in November 2012 she gave birth to a baby boy.

== Media career ==
After graduating from Beit Zvi, she hosted children's shows on Israeli TV's Channel One. In 2000 she appeared in a renewed version of the humour show Domino Gros, together with Maya Dagan and Anat Magen. In 2002, she performed on Yair Lapid's talk show. She managed the comic part of the show and presented a stand-up show together with Maya Dagan. In 2004, she won the "Entertainment woman of the year" prize. In 2006, she was named "Television woman of the year" at the "People of the year" ceremony on Channel Two.

Ashkenazi is the star of "What's that nonsense? (Hebrew: מה זה השטויות האלה)".

== Filmography ==
Year	Film	Role	Notes
2000	Domino (דומינו)		
2000–2001	Hanimnomim	Maim	
2002	Yair Lapid Show	stand-up comedian	
2004	HaShir Shelanu	herself	
2005	What's This Bullshit		
2013	Bilti Hafich	Rona	
2020	Levad Babait	Nati	
2021	Shitat Ashkenazi		
2022	Strictly Come Dancing (Israel)		
2024	Haiiti Meta		

== Family ==
In 2001 Ashkenazi married actor Kobi Doron and in 2004 they divorced. Since 2010, she has been in a relationship with Eitan Ben-Zakan and they have a son and two daughters. The two were married on October 26, 2018.

She lives in Tel Aviv.
