= Gili Mossinson =

Israeli basketball player

Gili Mossinson גילי מוסינזון
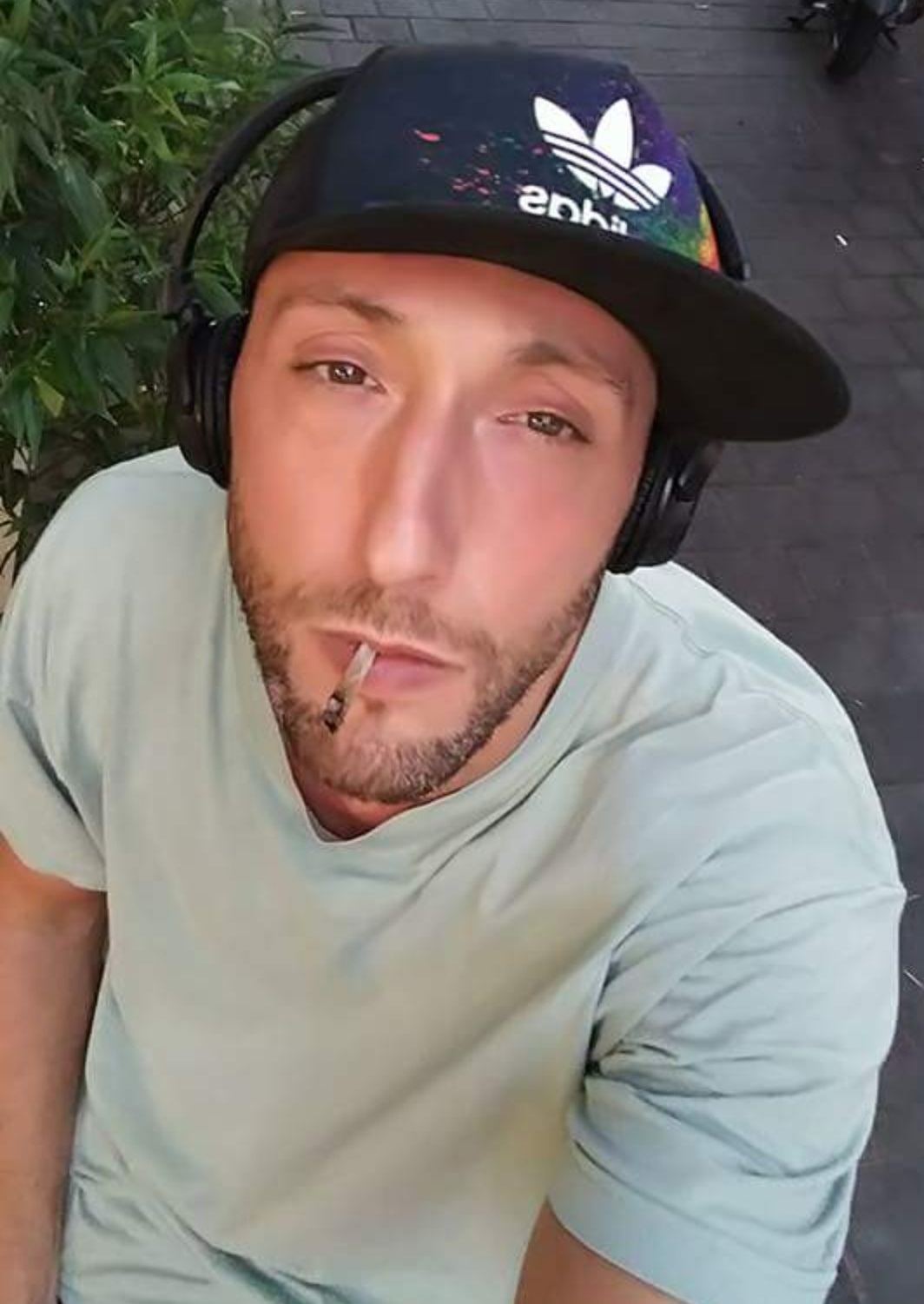
- Gil Mosinzon, 2017

Hapoel Galil Elyon
- Position: Forward
- League: Israeli Super League

Personal information
- Born: September 29, 1978 (age 48) Tel Aviv, Israel
- Listed height: 6 ft 9.5 in (2.07 m)
- Listed weight: 200 lb (91 kg)

Career information
- Playing career: 1996–2014

Career history

Playing
- 1996-2000: Hapoel Tel Aviv (Youth)
- 2001-2002: Maccabi Hadera
- 2002: Ironi Ramat Gan
- 2002: Hapoel Tel Aviv
- 2003-2004: Ironi Ramat Hasharon
- 2004-2006: Maccabi Rishon LeZion

Coaching
- ?: Hapoel Tel Aviv

Gili Mossinson (Hebrew: גילי מוסינזון; born 29 September 1978 in Tel Aviv, Israel) is an Israeli basketball player.

== Career ==
He played for several teams in the Israeli Basketball League including Hapoel Tel Aviv, Maccabi Rishon LeZion and Hapoel Galil Elyon. Mossinson played for both Israel U18 (1996) and Israel U21 (1998), and played a single game in Israel's national basketball team, against Denmark.

== Personal life ==
His father, Yigal Mossinson, was an author and playwright and laureate of the Prime Minister’s Prize for Authors. He came out as bisexual in 2016.
