= Hilla Nachshon =

Israeli actress

Hilla Nachshon הילה נחשון
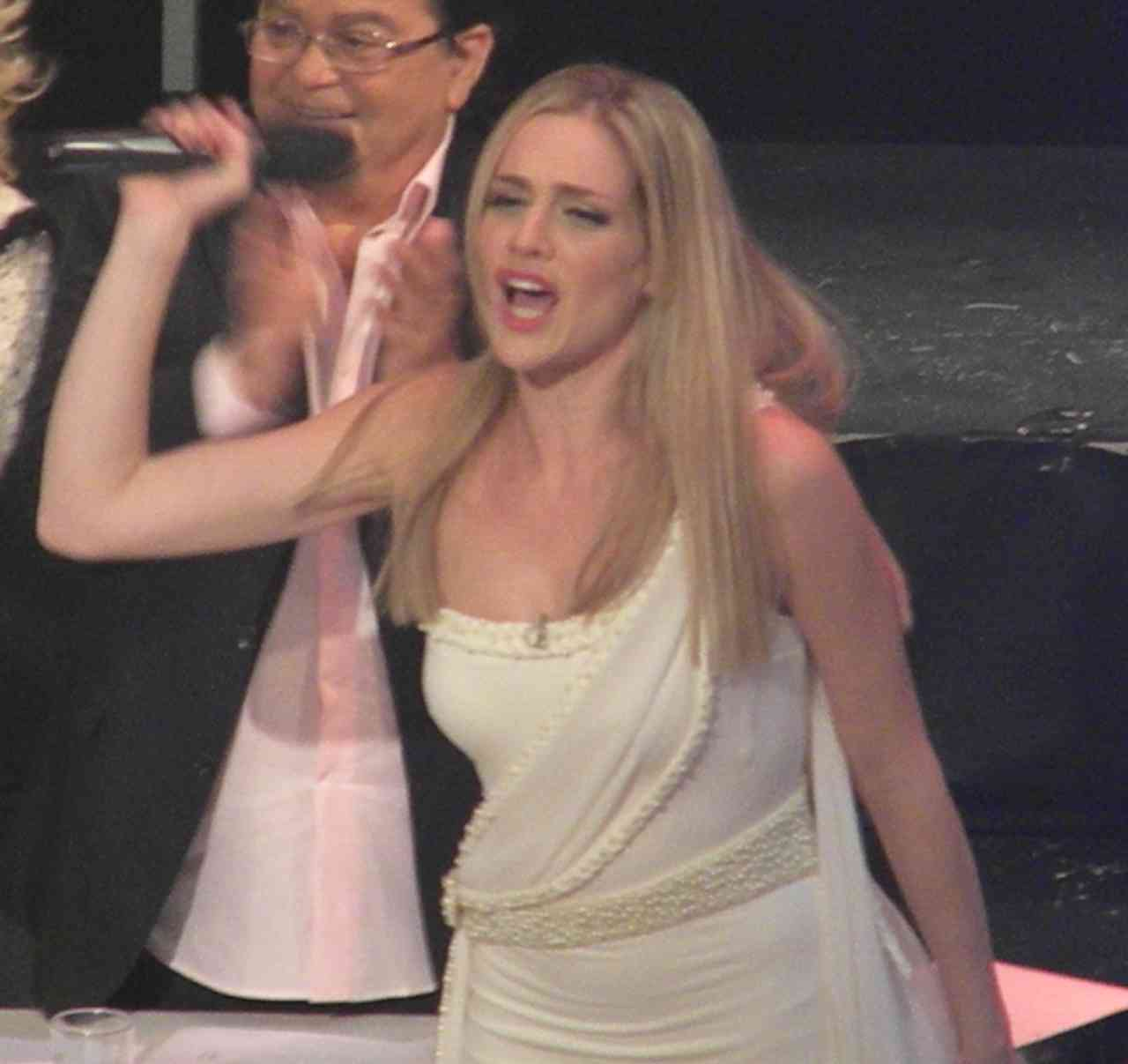
- Nachshon in 2010
- Born: Hilla Nachshon; 13 October 1980 (age 45); Kiryat Bialik, Israel
- Spouse(s): Asi Domb (m. 2004; div. 2006) Eyal Hassid (m. 2013; div. 2015)
- Partner: Yonatan Cohen (2007–2011)
- Children: 2
- Modeling information
- Height: 1.72 m (5 ft 8 in)
- Hair color: Blonde
- Eye color: Blue

Hilla Nachshon (or Hila, Hebrew: הילה נחשון; born 13 October 1980) is an Israeli television host, actress, and former model.

== Early life ==
Nachshon was born in Kiryat Bialik, Israel, to a family of Ashkenazi Jewish (Polish-Jewish) descent. Her father is Yosef Nahshon (originally Yosef Zilberman), and her mother is Tamar (née Rotem). Nachshon grew up in Kiryat Haroshet. She has one younger sister and a set of twin brothers.

In the late 1990s, Nachshon served as a soldier in the Military Police Corps of the Israel Defense Forces.

== Career ==
Nachshon initially gained fame as a model. In 2003, Nachshon participated in the musical The Little Prince. Later on, she appeared in TV commercials for the popular Israeli dairy pudding Milky and for the Israeli fashion brand Tamnun.

As a result of her success, in 2005 Nachshon began to host the entertainment show Y on ten (Y בעשר) on the broadcasts of the satellite television provider Yes, initially alongside Michael Hanegbi and later alongside Aviad Kisos. That year she also played a cameo role in the daily TV drama HaShir Shelanu. Also in that year, she began to host the Israeli version of the reality show Dancing with the Stars on the Israeli channel 2, along with Avi Kushnir. In 2010 and in 2011 Nachshon hosted the Miss Israel beauty pageant competition.

In 2016, she played Havatzelet in HOT's comedy series Shutafim.

== Personal life ==
Her first marriage was to Israeli Premier League footballer Asi Domb between the years 2004 and 2006.

In 2007, she began a high-profile relationship with model Yonatan Cohen. At that time, she moved in with Cohen to moshav Beit Nekofa. On 31 March 2008, their daughter was born. They separated in 2011.

Her second marriage was to Israeli businessman Eyal Hassid between 2013 and 2015. They had a son in 2013.

Nachshon resided with her children in Kadima, Israel, although she recently returned to Tel Aviv.
