= Michal Amdursky =

Israeli dancer and singer

Michal Amdursky מיכל אמדורסקי
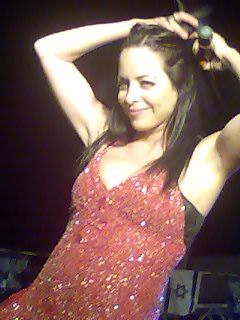

Background information
- Born: 1975 (age 49–50)
- Origin: Israel
- Genres: Dance, Pop
- Occupations: Dancer, Singer
- Education: Bat-Dor Dance Company; Hungarian State Opera House; Yoram Levinstein Acting Studio
- Spouse: Assaf Amdursky
- Children: 2

Michal Amdursky (Hebrew: מיכל אמדורסקי; born in 1975) is an Israeli dancer and singer.

== Biography ==
Michal Amdursky was married to Assaf Amdursky, with whom she has two children. She is one of the pioneers of the Israeli Dance Music genre. Amdurski began dancing at the age of 6 at the Bat-Dor Dance Company studio. At age 15, she moved to Budapest, where she studied Classical Dance at the Hungarian State Opera House. Later, she returned to Israel to study at the Yoram Loewenstein Performing Arts Studio.

In 1999 Amdursky took part as a supporting actress in the TV drama "Deadly Fortune" (Kesef Katlani). The series was produced by Danny Kfir, publicized by Estee Shiraz, directed by Eran Riklis and was broadcast on prime time in Channels 2 and 3.

In 2000, Amdursky sang Luna in the pre-Eurovision song contest and came in third place. She was a judge on the Israeli TV reality show "Nolad Lirkod" (Born to Dance) for several years.

The songs on her first album Notzetzim were written by Assaf Amdursky. Her second album "Let Her Sweat" combines dance and pop music.

== Albums ==
- 1998 Sparklers
- 2000 Let Her Sweat
- 2004 Michal Amdursky EP
- 2009 Ishto Shel
