= Shlomo Lahiani =

Israeli politician (born 1965)

Shlomo Lahiani שלמה לחיאני
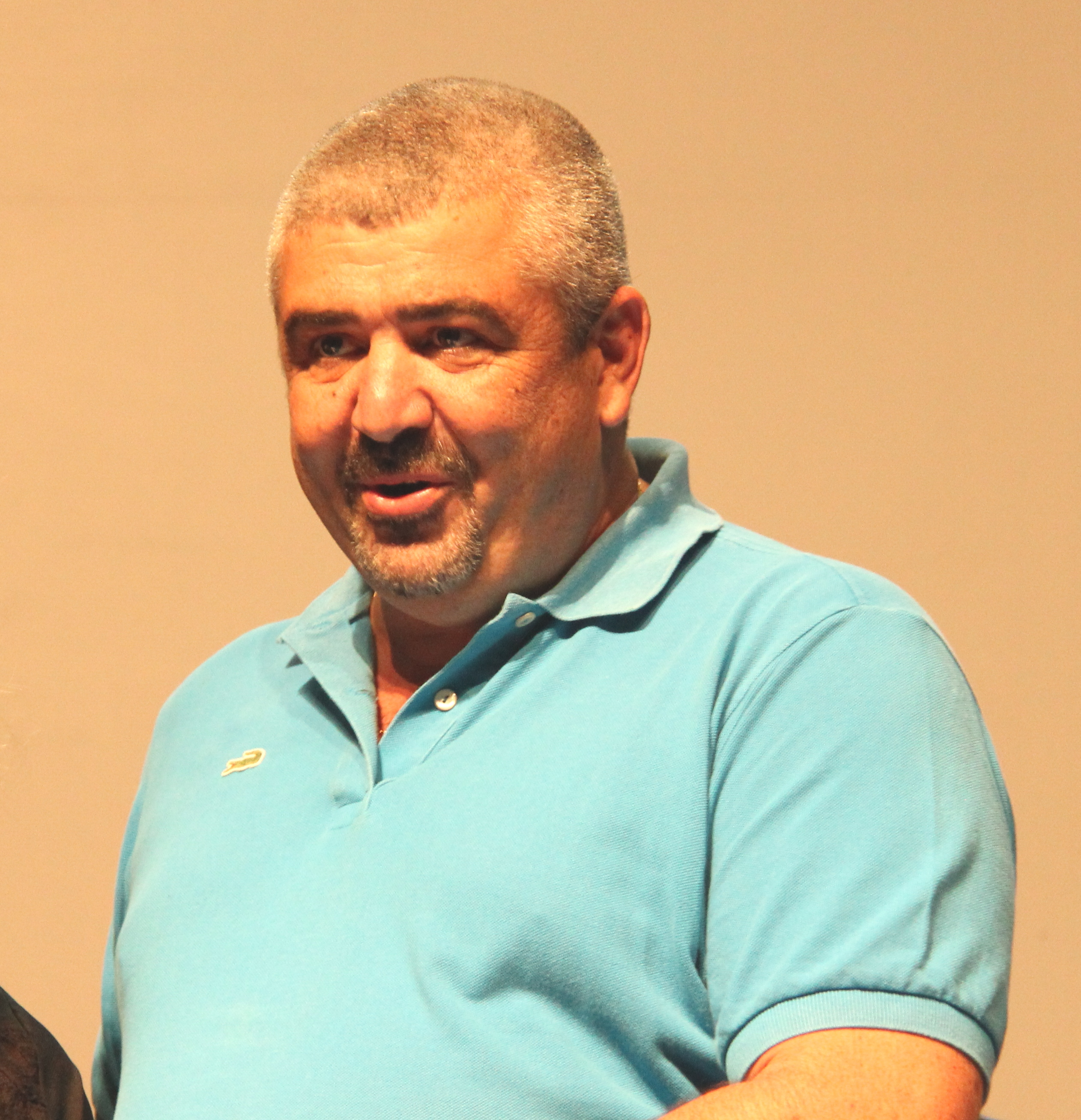
- Shlomo Lahiani

11th Mayor of Bat Yam

Personal details
- Born: 22 May 1965 (age 61)
- Party: Kadima

Military service
- Allegiance: Israel

Shlomo Lahiani (Hebrew: שלמה לחיאני; born May 22, 1965) is a business owner and former Israeli politician. He was formerly mayor of Bat Yam. In 2014, following an investigation, Lahiani pleaded guilty to three counts of breach of public trust.

== Biography ==
Shlomo Lahiani was born in Israel. His father was an immigrant from Bengazi, Libya.

On 9 March 2025, he was lightly injured alongside another person after his car exploded on the Ayalon Highway in Tel Aviv. In a prior incident in January 2024, a bomb was found in his car and was safely defused.

== Political career ==
In 1997, he founded the independent political movement Bat Yam BeRosh Muram (Hebrew: בת ים בראש מורם, "Bat Yam with its head held high"). In 1998, the movement won five seats on the Bat Yam city council. He served as a city council member and leader of the opposition from 1998 until 2003, when he became mayor. he was first elected mayor as a Labour-backed independent in 2003 with 45% of the vote, beating the Likud candidate. He was subsequently re-elected, with 86.3% of the vote, reportedly the highest ever in a large Israeli city, in 2008.

== Public activism ==
In 2000, he founded Ohavim, a non-profit organization with the goal of improving welfare and child care, and managing soup kitchens in the city.

== Controversy ==
In December 2009, Lahiani was arrested on charges of fraud, breach of trust, embezzlement and following a two-year undercover investigation. Lahiani was indicted in April 2013 with breach of trust.

In a plea bargain reached in 2014, Lahiani pleaded guilty to three reduced charges of breach of trust. On September 30, 2014, he was given six months of community service, as well as a six-month suspended sentence and a 250,000-shekel (US$67,840) fine, and barred from politics for seven years. He admitted to using money from the bribes to pay debts of his construction company, Alshav.
