= Galit Gutman =

Israeli television host, model and actress

Galit Gutman גלית גוטמן
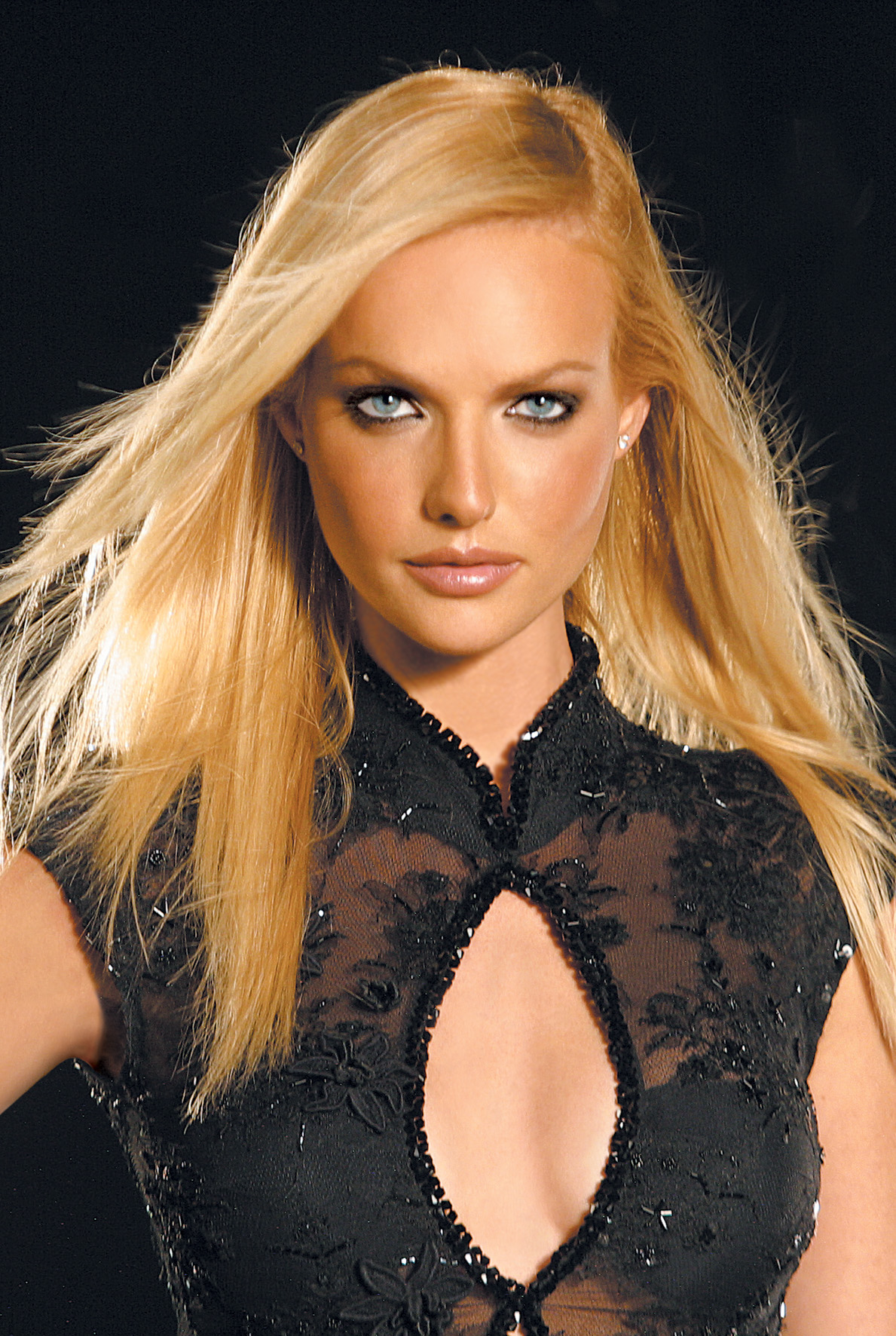
- Born: September 23, 1972 (age 54); Herzeliya, Israel
- Children: 2

Galit Gutman (Hebrew: גלית גוטמן; born September 23, 1972) is an Israeli actress, television host and fashion model.

== Biography ==
Galit Gutmman is married to photojournalist Ziv Koren and the mother of two daughters. She began her modeling career after winning the title "Discovery of the Year". She went on to become one of Israel's leading model.

She was a model for Castro, H & O, Croacker, Oberzon, and Dani Mizrahi.

Gutman’s family is of Polish-Jewish and Romanian-Jewish descent.

== Acting and television career ==
Gutman studied acting at Yoram Loewenstein Performing Arts Studio and appeared in the Israeli soap opera Ramat Aviv Gimel. In 2003, she presented the Golden Curtain Awards of the E! channel. From 2006 to 2008, she hosted HaDugmaniot, the Israeli version of America's Next Top Model.

In 2012, she hosted "Brothers for Life", a documentary that deals with children in a family with many children.

== See also ==
- Israeli fashion
- Look (modeling agency)
