= Pnai Plus =

Israeli weekly entertainment magazine

Pnai Plus / Pplus
- Categories: Entertainment and television magazine
- Frequency: Weekly
- Founded: 1989
- Company: Yedioth Ahronoth
- Country: Israel
- Language: Hebrew
- Website: www.pplus.ynet.co.il

Pnai Plus (Hebrew: פנאי פלוס, lit. Leisure Plus), or Pplus, is one of the major Israeli magazines published weekly that covers the world of entertainment and television worldwide as well as the local Israeli television and celebrities scene. Created in 1989 and owned by Yedioth Ahronoth, the magazine contains sections such as cinema, music, culture, and food.

== History ==
In September 2004, Pnai Plus published a two-page article about Madonna's Jewish faith.

In 2018, the readers of Pnai Plus named the rap sensation Dudu Faruk (Ori Comay) sexiest man in Israel.
