= List of Split episodes =

This is a complete list of episodes for the HOT supernatural drama television series Split. The programma's cast included Amit Farkash as Ella Rosen, Yon Tumarkin as Leo Zachs, Yedidia Vital as Omer Teneh, Avi Kornick as Guy Rosen, Maya Shoef as Zohar Green, Idan Ashkenazi as Moshe "Sushi" Arieli, Anna Zaikin as Nurit "Nicky" Shilon and Lee Biran as Adam. 135 episodes have aired in three seasons, which were all written by Shai Kapon and directed by Shai Alon, Ilan Rosenfeld.

== Summary ==
Series	Episodes	Originally aired	
Series	Episodes	Series premiere	Series finale
Season 1	45	28 May 2009	28 July 2009
Season 2	45	6 May 2010	7 July 2010
Season 3	45	1 December 2011	31 January 2012

== Season 1 ==
Season one deals with the girl Ella Rosen who finds out that she is a split (half vampire, half human). Meanwhile, the vampires are searching for a new vampire prophet who becomes their leader.

No. overall	No. in season	Title	Written by	Directed by	Original release date
1	1	"Episode 1"	Shai Kapon	Shai Alon, Ilan Rosenfeld	28 May 2009
The vampire prophet Ardak has a vision. The new vampire prophet is going to be a girl who is a split (half human and half vampire). Adark finds the girl (Ella Rosen) at Green High School and sends the vampire Leo there to protect her. The student Shahar Fox gets bitten by a vampire who is fleeing from "The Order of Blood" (an organization which hunts vampires). As Shahar Fox dies, Ardak resurrects him. The vampire who has bitten Shahar Fox gets punished. "The Order of Blood" finds out about Ella however she is saved by Leo, who deletes the memories of the members of the Order of Blood.
2	2	"Episode 2"	Shai Kapon	Shai Alon, Ilan Rosenfeld	28 May 2009
Leo tells Ella that he is a vampire and she is a split, however Ella can't deal with the news, so Leo deletes her memory and introduces himself again as another human student.
3	3	"Episode 3"	Shai Kapon	Shai Alon, Ilan Rosenfeld	29 May 2009
Ella doesn't seem to be interested in Leo. So Leo tries to make jealous by flirting with Zohar, however Ella does not care about this.
4	4	"Episode 4"	Shai Kapon	Shai Alon, Ilan Rosenfeld	1 June 2009
Phaton wants to become the new vampire prophet, but the new Split is in his way. He doesn't know that the Split is Ella. So he convinces Ethos to follow Leo, who protects the split. Leo discovers important things in the principal's office but he is interrupted by Omer. Leo tries to erase Omer's memory but finds out that he can't.
5	5	"Episode 5"	Shai Kapon	Shai Alon, Ilan Rosenfeld	2 June 2009
Guy tries to make Zohar jealous by flirting with Nicky.
6	6	"Episode 6"	Shai Kapon	Shai Alon, Ilan Rosenfeld	3 June 2009
Ethos and Leo are fighting against each other and Ethos is stopped by Omer.
7	7	"Episode 7"	Shai Kapon	Shai Alon, Ilan Rosenfeld	4 June 2009
Phaton goes to the Green High School and pretends to be a technician. He tries to get closer to Leo.
8	8	"Episode 8"	Shai Kapon	Shai Alon, Ilan Rosenfeld	5 June 2009
Phaton tries to kill Omer's uncle Rafael, but Omer saves him.
9	9	"Episode 9"	Shai Kapon	Shai Alon, Ilan Rosenfeld	8 June 2009
Leo asks Omer for help to get closer to Ella.
10	10	"Episode 10"	Shai Kapon	Shai Alon, Ilan Rosenfeld	9 June 2009
Phaton turns against the Vampire Council (the government of the vampires). Ella starts to get more interested in Leo. Leo tells Omer, that Ella is adopted and that he has to tell her this.
11	11	"Episode 11"	Shai Kapon	Shai Alon, Ilan Rosenfeld	10 June 2009
Ella dreams of Leo, while her parents get a mysterious letter. Ella finds a photo of her as a baby in her locker which she has never seen.
12	12	"Episode 12"	Shai Kapon	Shai Alon, Ilan Rosenfeld	11 June 2009
Ella asks her parents to tell the truth about the photograph, however her parents lie.
13	13	"Episode 13"	Shai Kapon	Shai Alon, Ilan Rosenfeld	12 June 2009
Phaton puts a microphone into Ella's house. Leo and Omer discuss about how they can tell the truth to Ella.
14	14	"Episode 14"	Shai Kapon	Shai Alon, Ilan Rosenfeld	15 June 2009
Ella is feeling sad after she has found out that she is adopted. She is telling Leo about this.
15	15	"Episode 15"	Shai Kapon	Shai Alon, Ilan Rosenfeld	16 June 2009
Ella is having nightmares, however in her dreams Leo is always there to rescue her.
16	16	"Episode 16"	Shai Kapon	Shai Alon, Ilan Rosenfeld	17 June 2009
Phaton tries to convince the Vampire Council to act against Ardak's wishes.
17	17	"Episode 17"	Shai Kapon	Shai Alon, Ilan Rosenfeld	18 June 2009
Guy and Ella talk about adoption. Guy makes her feel better by telling her that she is still his sister and for him nothing has changed.
18	18	"Episode 18"	Shai Kapon	Shai Alon, Ilan Rosenfeld	19 June 2009
The Order of the blood kidnaps Rafael, however he thinks that they are aliens.
19	19	"Episode 19"	Shai Kapon	Shai Alon, Ilan Rosenfeld	22 June 2009
Ella finds out that she is a split.
20	20	"Episode 20"	Shai Kapon	Shai Alon, Ilan Rosenfeld	23 June 2009
The principal Amnon is revealed as the leader of "The Order of Blood".
21	21	"Episode 21"	Shai Kapon	Shai Alon, Ilan Rosenfeld	24 June 2009
Guy and Zohar are kissing each other.
22	22	"Episode 22"	Shai Kapon	Shai Alon, Ilan Rosenfeld	25 June 2009
A dance night is organized at school. When Ella sings on stage she remembers that someone tried to kidnap her as a child when she was on stage. She finds out that the kidnapper was the principal Amnon.
23	23	"Episode 23"	Shai Kapon	Shai Alon, Ilan Rosenfeld	26 June 2009
Leo and Ella end up kissing each other.
24	24	"Episode 24"	Shai Kapon	Shai Alon, Ilan Rosenfeld	29 June 2009
Tamar (a member of the order of the Blood) tries to kill Leo. However, she is stopped by Omer.
25	25	"Episode 25"	Shai Kapon	Shai Alon, Ilan Rosenfeld	30 June 2009
Ardak is missing. Leo thinks that Amnon is behind this so he kidnaps Zohar and tries to force Amnon to tell him where Ardak is. However Amnon doesn't know. After Leo has set Zohar free he erases her memories.
26	26	"Episode 26"	Shai Kapon	Shai Alon, Ilan Rosenfeld	1 July 2009
Ella is jealous because she thinks Leo is dating Zohar. Meanwhile, Leo explains to Omer that Ella needs their help and that she is going to be the new vampire prophet. The council wants to kill Leo, because they think he is responsible for Adark's disappearance. Omer agrees to help Leo, but only under the condition that Leo will leave Ella after this. Leo agrees. Ardak is killed by the vampire Lana who tries to kill Leo.
27	27	"Episode 27"	Shai Kapon	Shai Alon, Ilan Rosenfeld	2 July 2009
After Lana has killed Ardak chaos erupts. Leo tries to kill Lana to revenge Ardak, but at the end he stops himself. Phaton tells the vampire council that Leo planned that Ardak would be killed. Phaton sets the vampire Carmel free. She is an old lover of Leo and should distract him from protecting Ella. She possesses the body of Nicky. Phaton promises to set her completely free if she does what he says.
28	28	"Episode 28"	Shai Kapon	Shai Alon, Ilan Rosenfeld	3 July 2009
Ella finds out more about the vampires and vampire history.
29	29	"Episode 29"	Shai Kapon	Shai Alon, Ilan Rosenfeld	6 July 2009
Phaton is desperate that he is not the new prophet after the death of Ardak. Guy seeks help from Sushi to win back Zohar. Guy sees Amnon and Tamar in Amnon's office and thinks that they are having an affair. He tells Zohar about it.
30	30	"Episode 30"	Shai Kapon	Shai Alon, Ilan Rosenfeld	7 July 2009
Amnon thinks that Leo is a vampire. He knows that he hangs out with Ella. So he asks "The Order of Blood" to put cameras into the house. The cameras will report the presence of Leo in the house. Leo visits Ella at home. He impresses her parents by speaking many different languages and having visited Paraguay.
31	31	"Episode 31"	Shai Kapon	Shai Alon, Ilan Rosenfeld	8 July 2009
Zohar agrees to go out on a date with Sushi. She doesn't want to be with him but does want to make him feel more confident around her.
32	32	"Episode 32"	Shai Kapon	Shai Alon, Ilan Rosenfeld	9 July 2009
After Leo tells the council that Ella is the new prophet, Phaton flees and goes after Ella. He tries to kill her but the gun does not work. Ella escapes.
33	33	"Episode 33"	Shai Kapon	Shai Alon, Ilan Rosenfeld	10 July 2009
After kidnapping Leo, Amnon and Tamar begin to torture him.
34	34	"Episode 34"	Shai Kapon	Shai Alon, Ilan Rosenfeld	13 July 2009
Leo's dangerous former lover Carmel sets Leo free. They kiss.
35	35	"Episode 35"	Shai Kapon	Shai Alon, Ilan Rosenfeld	14 July 2009
Carmel has deleted Amnon's memory. However he doesn't only forget his last moments but his whole life. So Tamar takes over his job and runs the school. Carmel attacks Guy and bites him.
36	36	"Episode 36"	Shai Kapon	Shai Alon, Ilan Rosenfeld	15 July 2009
The doctor informs Zohar that her father has lost 80% of memory. Guy is taken to the hospital after fainting.
37	37	"Episode 37"	Shai Kapon	Shai Alon, Ilan Rosenfeld	16 July 2009
Zohar finds out more about her father's work. Carmel (in the body of Nicky) is having fun with Leo in a bar. Omer looks at the video tapes, that were recorded on the day of the party. He sees that Nicky (owned by Carmel) bites Guy. Ella's mother blames Ella for Guy's illness.
38	38	"Episode 38"	Shai Kapon	Shai Alon, Ilan Rosenfeld	17 July 2009
When Guy awakes, Sara apologizes to Ella for being a bad mother and for having blamed Ella for what happened to Guy. Ella and Omer see the marks on Guy's neck; they think that he might have become a vampire. Tamar shows Zohar and Sushi Den "Order of the Blood,". She tells them about the existence of vampires. Amnon finds the diary of his daughter Zohar. He begins to read it and discovers that he hasn't been a good father to her.
39	39	"Episode 39"	Shai Kapon	Shai Alon, Ilan Rosenfeld	20 July 2009
Carmel distracts Leo so much that he forgets to take care of Ella.
40	40	"Episode 40"	Shai Kapon	Shai Alon, Ilan Rosenfeld	21 July 2009
Guy can't control his blood lust. As his parents send a psychologist to him he is ready to attack her
41	41	"Episode 41"	Shai Kapon	Shai Alon, Ilan Rosenfeld	22 July 2009
Zohar discovers that Guy is a vampire.
42	42	"Episode 42"	Shai Kapon	Shai Alon, Ilan Rosenfeld	25 July 2009
The vampire Lana brings Guy to Jamon, who helps Guy to live with his blood lust.
43	43	"Episode 43"	Shai Kapon	Shai Alon, Ilan Rosenfeld	24 July 2009
Zohar, Sushi and Nicky begin to investigate the weaknesses of vampires.
44	44	"Episode 44"	Shai Kapon	Shai Alon, Ilan Rosenfeld	27 July 2009
Lana tries to attack Ella's parents and is killed by Ella's mother, but Ella resurrects her in front of her astonished parents. She explains that she is a split. Amnon gets back his memories.
45	45	"Episode 45"	Shai Kapon	Shai Alon, Ilan Rosenfeld	28 July 2009
The students find out that Ella is a split. She is threatened by Amnon with a knife. Ella shows a vision to Amnon where his daughter dies by protecting Guy in a war between humans and vampires. Leo also tells Tamar that her parents were killed and that the vampires saved her. So Amnon and Tamar both decide not to hunt vampires anymore. Ella has a hard decision to make. Both Leo and Omer want her as a girlfriend. She tells Leo that she sees him more as a guardian angel but loves Omer and ends up with Omer.

== Season 2 ==
Lilith has been defeated by the old vampire prophet Ardak a thousand years ago. However, her son Adam awakes and comes as a student to the Green High School. He befriends Ella, but is a danger to the vampires. He kills them by touching them.

No. overall	No. in season	Title	Written by	Directed by	Original release date
46	1	"Episode 1"	Shai Kapon	Shai Alon, Ilan Rosenfeld	6 May 2010
The chapter begins 1000 years ago where Ardak meets Lilith, queen of the demons. She tries to convince him to work together, however Ardak says no. So she says that this would mean war between them. Ardak defeats her and her descendants. He spares Lilith's follower Dima and tells him that his queen is dead. In the present, Dima is the gym teacher. Ella decides to stay at school and be a normal girl. The vampires want to change her mind, however Ella isn't convinced that this would be the right choice.
47	2	"Episode 2"	Shai Kapon	Shai Alon, Ilan Rosenfeld	7 May 2010
The episode begins one month before what happened in the previous episode. The country is in chaos; the existence of vampires is something already known by the community. As they don't want a war between humans and vampires, they make all humans forget about the vampires, except ten people who are close to Ella.
48	3	"Episode 3"	Shai Kapon	Shai Alon, Ilan Rosenfeld	10 May 2010
During an earthquake, one of Lilith's descendants wakes up. Dima wants to find him. A new student called Anchovy comes to Green High. Dima believes that he is the demon, but discovers that he isn't.
49	4	"Episode 4"	Shai Kapon	Shai Alon, Ilan Rosenfeld	11 May 2010
Leo is in a bad shape. Jamon warns Leo that being in love with Ella will harm him. Vampires who feel unreturned love will die. Guy's father tries to find a cure for vampirism to make his son become human again.
50	5	"Episode 5"	Shai Kapon	Shai Alon, Ilan Rosenfeld	12 May 2010
Jamon forces Ella to drink blood and wake up all dangerous vampires. Dima finds out that the new student Adam is the demon and tells him that he can help Adam. To protect Leo, Jamon tells Ella that the dangerous vampire Ethos will be her new guardian. Anchovy tries to impress Nicky by acting like her old boyfriend Sushi.
51	6	"Episode 6"	Shai Kapon	Shai Alon, Ilan Rosenfeld	13 May 2010
Ella befriends Adam. She saves him and takes him home, unaware that he is a danger to vampires and that he might kill them. Ethos wants to stop being a guardian and leaves Ella.
52	1	"Episode 7"	Shai Kapon	Shai Alon, Ilan Rosenfeld	14 May 2010
Adam finds out that he is a demon. He is born to kill vampires and take their souls. Leo collapses when he sees Ella and is getting weaker and weaker. Ethos kidnaps Leo.
53	8	"Episode 8"	Shai Kapon	Shai Alon, Ilan Rosenfeld	17 May 2010
Carmel comes to school as a student. She is watching out for Ella. Carmel and Adam join Ella's band.
54	9	"Episode 9"	Shai Kapon	Shai Alon, Ilan Rosenfeld	18 May 2010
Sharkar Fooks finds photos of his father that are showing vampires. Ella and Omer get even closer to each other. Anchovy wants to go to a club with Nicky, however he doesn't get in so he starts a fight. Nicky doesn't like that and tells him that he leaves a bad impression.
55	10	"Episode 10"	Shai Kapon	Shai Alon, Ilan Rosenfeld	19 May 2010
Andrew Fooks kidnaps Anchovy and makes experiments on him. He wants to find out if he is a vampire. Nicky finds him unconscious on the school floor. Nicky gets to know a vampire who wants to date her. Leo is worrying about Ella's new friend Adam. He thinks that Adam might hurt Ella, so he asks Omer about Adam. However, Omer likes Adam.
56	11	"Episode 11"	Shai Kapon	Shai Alon, Ilan Rosenfeld	20 May 2010
Tamar comes back from a journey. She gets to know Andrew, who wants Tamar to join him killing vampires. Zohar admits to Nicky that she loves Guy, but that he doesn't like that he has become a vampire.
57	12	"Episode 12"	Shai Kapon	Shai Alon, Ilan Rosenfeld	21 May 2010
Tamar convinces Andrew Fooks that he can trust her. However, she works for Amnon who wants to find out what Andrew is up to. Zohar feels let down by her father, who is at hospital as he only wants to talk to Tamar but not to her. When Zohar meets Guy she apologized for not having liked him as a vampire.
58	13	"Episode 13"	Shai Kapon	Shai Alon, Ilan Rosenfeld	24 May 2010
After Adam has killed the new vampire teacher Yulis he spits out a stone. However he doesn't know what this is.
59	14	"Episode 14"	Shai Kapon	Shai Alon, Ilan Rosenfeld	25 May 2010
Dima tells Adam that the stone includes the soul of the vampire and that Lilith needs to have them. He also tells Adam that the stone contains a lot of energy. Rafael has licked on the stone. He is able to walk now, before that he could only move in a wheel chair.
60	15	"Episode 15"	Shai Kapon	Shai Alon, Ilan Rosenfeld	26 May 2010
Adam tells Rafael that he can only walk for a short time until the energy of the stone is gone. Rafael doesn't like that he kidnaps Adam.
61	16	"Episode 16"	Shai Kapon	Shai Alon, Ilan Rosenfeld	27 May 2010
Leo gets weaker and weaker, he collapses on the street. Nicky doesn't want the vampire Mory to follow her anymore. Zohar is flirting with Shakar Fooks to find out what his father is up to and sees Tamar at his home. Ethos fells in love with Lucy the Co-worker of Andrew. However, when she finds out that he is a vampire she is scared and runs away.
62	17	"Episode 17"	Shai Kapon	Shai Alon, Ilan Rosenfeld	28 May 2010
When Lucy arrives at home she finds out that Zohar and Tamar are there. She threatens them with a gun. However, they are set free buy Andrew Fooks who trusts Tamar rather than Lucy.
63	18	"Episode 18"	Shai Kapon	Shai Alon, Ilan Rosenfeld	31 May 2010
Leo collapses at Rafael's house and stays unconscious. Omer and Ella don't seem to get along very well as a couple. After having erased Lucy's memory Ethos flits with her again. Lucy seems to like him. Meanwhile, Andrew Fooks shows Lucy and Tamar a secret box, which include the powers of an ancient vampire. Whoever opens it will get the power. However, it is sealed and can only be opened with the blood of ten vampires. Andrew Fooks already has the blood of five vampires and wants to get the blood of another five vampires.
64	19	"Episode 19"	Shai Kapon	Shai Alon, Ilan Rosenfeld	1 June 2010
Andrew Fooks organizes a party at the school, at a night when the vampires can't control themselves. When they don't appear at the dance the vampires are discovered and when they do appear at the dance they are discovered when they can't control themselves. So the students have an idea. They all dress up as vampires and when it comes to midnight they all hide somewhere until the morning.
65	20	"Episode 20"	Shai Kapon	Shai Alon, Ilan Rosenfeld	2 June 2010
Omer and Ella break up during the party night. Andrew finds out that Leo is a vampire and kidnaps him. Guy can't control himself and his blood lust, he screams at Zohar and pushes her away. Zohar runs away. Nicky tells Omer she likes him however he says that he doesn't want to her to be his consolation. Nicky runs away she cries.
66	21	"Episode 21"	Shai Kapon	Shai Alon, Ilan Rosenfeld	3 June 2010
When Ella tells Adam that Leo is very important to her Adam sets Leo free. He helps him to escape from Andrew Fooks. Nicky is bitten by Mory.
67	22	"Episode 22"	Shai Kapon	Shai Alon, Ilan Rosenfeld	4 June 2010
Leo and Ella become a couple again.
68	23	"Episode 23"	Shai Kapon	Shai Alon, Ilan Rosenfeld	7 June 2010
Guy is sad about what he did to Zohar during the party at school. He talks with Carmel about this and gets closer to her.
69	24	"Episode 24"	Shai Kapon	Shai Alon, Ilan Rosenfeld	8 June 2010
Mory is still fascinated by Nicky he runs after her. Nicky is scared. She screams at him and pushes him away. She runs away leaving a desperate Mory behind. Ethos is meeting Lucy at a cafe where he works, who cries about Andrew Fooks. When Ethos leaves Mory talks to Lucy. He cheers her up and leaves the cafe with her.
70	25	"Episode 25"	Shai Kapon	Shai Alon, Ilan Rosenfeld	9 June 2010
Mory attacks Lucy. However, Ethos comes around and saves her and Lucy discovers that both, Ethos and Mory are vampires. Now she has to rethink her views about vampires. She doesn't know what to think anymore, so Ethos leaves after having saved her.
71	26	"Episode 26"	Shai Kapon	Shai Alon, Ilan Rosenfeld	10 June 2010
Lucy visits Ethos. She apologizes for her prejudices against vampires.
72	27	"Episode 27"	Shai Kapon	Shai Alon, Ilan Rosenfeld	11 June 20107
Guy and Carmel become very close. They are kissing each other in front of Mory, who leaves sadly.
73	28	"Episode 28"	Shai Kapon	Shai Alon, Ilan Rosenfeld	14 June 2010
Omer is missing his uncle. He talks with Adam about this.
74	29	"Episode 29"	Shai Kapon	Shai Alon, Ilan Rosenfeld	15 June 2010
Guy bites Nicky.
75	30	"Episode 30"	Shai Kapon	Shai Alon, Ilan Rosenfeld	16 June 2010
Anchovy befriends with Zohar.
76	31	"Episode 31"	Shai Kapon	Shai Alon, Ilan Rosenfeld	17 June 2010
Anchovy and Zohar have their first date, while Guy and Carmel start a real relationship.
77	32	"Episode 32"	Shai Kapon	Shai Alon, Ilan Rosenfeld	18 June 2010
Omer starts working together with Andrew Fooks.
78	33	"Episode 33"	Shai Kapon	Shai Alon, Ilan Rosenfeld	21 June 2010
Adam kills Mory.
79	34	"Episode 34"	Shai Kapon	Shai Alon, Ilan Rosenfeld	22 June 2010
Adam and Leo start to fight against each other. However, Adam is protected by Ella, even though she knows he is a demon.
80	35	"Episode 35"	Shai Kapon	Shai Alon, Ilan Rosenfeld	23 June 2010
Adam kisses Ella. Shakar Fooks finds out that Leo and Guy are vampires.
81	36	"Episode 36"	Shai Kapon	Shai Alon, Ilan Rosenfeld	24 June 2010
Shakar Fooks speaks up against his father as Andrew Fooks threatens the vampires with a gun. He saves them.
82	37	"Episode 37"	Shai Kapon	Shai Alon, Ilan Rosenfeld	25 June 2010
Leo has opened the blood box and has gained a lot of power.
83	38	"Episode 38"	Shai Kapon	Shai Alon, Ilan Rosenfeld	28 June 2010
Leo tries to kill Adam. Ella doesn't have the strength to save Adam alone, so she wakes up Lilith. Adam is saved, however Leo and the others have forgotten what has happened in the past.
84	39	"Episode 39"	Shai Kapon	Shai Alon, Ilan Rosenfeld	29 June 2010
Ethos and Lucy have become a couple, they are watching Omer's band practicing. Dima meets Lilith for the first time after a thousand years.
85	40	"Episode 40"	Shai Kapon	Shai Alon, Ilan Rosenfeld	30 June 2010
Nicky and Omer start to develop some feelings for each other.
86	41	"Episode 41"	Shai Kapon	Shai Alon, Ilan Rosenfeld	1 July 2010
A news reporter comes to Jamon and the other vampires to interview them about vampirism.
87	42	"Episode 42"	Shai Kapon	Shai Alon, Ilan Rosenfeld	2 July 2010
Lilith threatens Adam. He's got to close to Ella.
88	43	"Episode 43"	Shai Kapon	Shai Alon, Ilan Rosenfeld	5 July 2010
Adam threatens Zohar and forces Amnon to go to Leo to send Leo to Lilith. Lilith hurts Leo and leaves him.
89	44	"Episode 44"	Shai Kapon	Shai Alon, Ilan Rosenfeld	6 July 2010
Ella has a vision of Leo being hurt by Lilith, while Dima saves Leo. Ethos and Lucy kiss for the first time.
90	45	"Episode 45"	Shai Kapon	Shai Alon, Ilan Rosenfeld	7 July 2010
The students fight against the demons. Ella fights against Lilith. The students win the fight against the demons, while Ella seems to have lost the fight against Lilith. Lilith wants to kill her. However, she is stopped by Adam, who sacrifices himself and kills Lilith. After this everything gets back to normal. Carmel is happy with her new lover Guy, while Zohar and Anchovy are dating. Nicky and Omer are a couple and Leo and Ella have finally found their way back to each other. However, one of Lilith's children has survived.

== Season 3 ==
The third season describes the adventures of the actors of Split.

No. overall	No. in season	Title	Written by	Directed by	Original release date
91	1	"Episode 1"	Shai Kapon	Shai Alon, Ilan Rosenfeld	1 December 2011
It's been a year since the second season was filmed. Yon (Yon Tumarkin) went to America to get a job there. Since he left the TV series Split, the producers try to look for a new actor who plays Leo. The actor Rubi arrives and wants to portray the new Leo. Agam (Agam Rodberg) breaks up with her boyfriend Moshik. Maya (Maya Shoef) supports her.
92	2	"Episode 2"	Shai Kapon	Shai Alon, Ilan Rosenfeld	1 December 2011
The reasons why Yon left Israel are revealed. His girlfriend Amit (Amit Farkash) had changed and strange things happened. Yon and Amit broke up. However, after some time in the United States Yon comes back to Israel.
93	3	"Episode 3"	Shai Kapon	Shai Alon, Ilan Rosenfeld	2 December 2011
Yon tells everyone to leave the stage, as they are in danger. Strange things happen on the set. Amit is chased by a ghost. Yon apologizes to Amit about leaving her. Amit forgives him, but also tells him that she now has a new boyfriend.
94	4	"Episode 4"	Shai Kapon	Shai Alon, Ilan Rosenfeld	5 December 2011
Yon attempts to capture the paranormal events that are happening on the set by camera. However, when he turns on the camera nothing happens. The actress Gaby tries to find out what's happening on the set and reads tarot cards. She sees something terrible.
95	5	"Episode 5"	Shai Kapon	Shai Alon, Ilan Rosenfeld	6 December 2011
Yon asks Gaby for help with the supernatural occurrences. Gaby tells him that they have to find out what the ghost want from them.
96	6	"Episode 6"	Shai Kapon	Shai Alon, Ilan Rosenfeld	7 December 2011
Amit doesn't like the script of the new series. Gaby tells Amit that Rubi is not what it seems, but Amit tells her that she loves Rubi. Yon apologizes to Rubi front of Amit. Agam and Yon start a relationship to make Amit jealous.
97	7	"Episode 7"	Shai Kapon	Shai Alon, Ilan Rosenfeld	8 December 2011
Gaby tries to find out what's up with Rubi.
98	8	"Episode 8"	Shai Kapon	Shai Alon, Ilan Rosenfeld	9 December 2011
Yon tell Agam that she deserves better than him. Maya doesn't understand why all the men are following Amit and she has no boyfriend at all.
99	9	"Episode 9"	Shai Kapon	Shai Alon, Ilan Rosenfeld	12 December 2011
Rubi turns out to be an evil spirit and attacks Yon.
100	10	"Episode 10"	Shai Kapon	Shai Alon, Ilan Rosenfeld	13 December 2011
Yedidia and Danny are fighting with each other. Ellinor is crying and blaming herself for what has happened between Danny and Yedidia.
101	11	"Episode 11"	Shai Kapon	Shai Alon, Ilan Rosenfeld	13 December 2011
It is the first day of the official filming for series three of Split.
102	12	"Episode 12"	Shai Kapon	Shai Alon, Ilan Rosenfeld	14 December 2011
Gaby is bitten by Yuvi and is taken to the hospital. However, a nurse discovers that she has no pulse. One of the children who want to watch the filming of Split sees the ghost of Rubi and is frightened.
103	13	"Episode 13"	Shai Kapon	Shai Alon, Ilan Rosenfeld	15 December 2011
Gaby is found dead in her home.
104	14	"Episode 14"	Shai Kapon	Shai Alon, Ilan Rosenfeld	16 December 2011
Yarden Detective Weiss wants investigate why Gaby has died and questions everyone on set. Yon apologizes to Amit and tells her what he feels for her. Yarden discovers that Gaby had died three days ago, but was last seen one day ago.
105	15	"Episode 15"	Shai Kapon	Shai Alon, Ilan Rosenfeld	19 December 2011
Yarden is in desperate need of someone who knows a lot of paranormal activities. Amit starts to think that while the events may actually be ghosts, and this causes a fight with Rubi. Yon feels terrible and Maya comforts him. Ruby and Amit have an argument because Amit wants to visit Yon.
106	16	"Episode 16"	Shai Kapon	Shai Alon, Ilan Rosenfeld	20 December 2011
Avi tells Maya that she should tell Yon about her feelings for him.
107	17	"Episode 17"	Shai Kapon	Shai Alon, Ilan Rosenfeld	21 December 2011
Yon wants to do an exorcism. Maya wants to leave Split.
108	18	"Episode 18"	Shai Kapon	Shai Alon, Ilan Rosenfeld	22 December 2011
Maya tells Yon she loves him, and he gives her hope that they might become a couple.
109	19	"Episode 19"	Shai Kapon	Shai Alon, Ilan Rosenfeld	23 December 2011
Agam and Moshik have an argument.
110	20	"Episode 20"	Shai Kapon	Shai Alon, Ilan Rosenfeld	26 December 2011
They do an exorcism, however it does not work because Rubi changed the words. Yarden detective confronts Rubi and tells him that he knows who Rubi really is. Rubi kills him.
111	21	"Episode 21"	Shai Kapon	Shai Alon, Ilan Rosenfeld	27 December 2011
Yon wants re-do the exorcism with Amit, but Amit gets angry about it. Rubi asks Amit to leave with him and Amit wants to go with him.
112	22	"Episode 22"	Shai Kapon	Shai Alon, Ilan Rosenfeld	28 December 2011
Rubi is happy when Amit tells him that Yon is leaving the series.
113	23	"Episode 23"	Shai Kapon	Shai Alon, Ilan Rosenfeld	1 January 2012
Shaul and Yon want to save an innocent.
114	24	"Episode 24"	Shai Kapon	Shai Alon, Ilan Rosenfeld	1 January 2012
Yon rejects Maya. He wants to save Amit from Rubi, whose body is possessed.
115	25	"Episode 25"	Shai Kapon	Shai Alon, Ilan Rosenfeld	5 January 2012
Rubi tells the producer to kill Maya.
116	26	"Episode 26"	Shai Kapon	Shai Alon, Ilan Rosenfeld	5 January 2012
Amit discovers that Rubi lies and has an argument with him.
117	27	"Episode 27"	Shai Kapon	Shai Alon, Ilan Rosenfeld	6 January 2012
Rubi proposes to Amit. Yon tells Maya at the airport that he really does not love her, but did not want to disappoint her.
118	28	"Episode 28"	Shai Kapon	Shai Alon, Ilan Rosenfeld	7 January 2012
Rubi discovers his mother lying dead on the floor of his apartment.
119	29	"Episode 29"	Shai Kapon	Shai Alon, Ilan Rosenfeld	9 January 2012
Ellinor and Danny sing together.
120	30	"Episode 30"	Shai Kapon	Shai Alon, Ilan Rosenfeld	10 January 2012
Amit asks Rubi about the death of his mother and tells him that she does not believe in him any longer. Yon is concerned about Amit's safety. Danny has uploaded a video on the internet where Ellinor is performing. Ellinor is angry about this but she doesn't realize how talented she is.
121	31	"Episode 31"	Shai Kapon	Shai Alon, Ilan Rosenfeld	11 January 2012
Yon and Amit get closer to each other again.
122	32	"Episode 32"	Shai Kapon	Shai Alon, Ilan Rosenfeld	12 January 2012
Noir is jealous about Ellinor's fame and tries ruin an interview with Ellinor.
123	33	"Episode 33"	Shai Kapon	Shai Alon, Ilan Rosenfeld	13 January 2012
Amit and Rubi want to get married on set.
124	34	"Episode 34"	Shai Kapon	Shai Alon, Ilan Rosenfeld	16 January 2012
Yon and Yedidia talk about the wedding.
125	35	"Episode 35"	Shai Kapon	Shai Alon, Ilan Rosenfeld	17 January 2012
Yon wants to kill Eco, the spirit which has possessed Rubi.
126	36	"Episode 36"	Shai Kapon	Shai Alon, Ilan Rosenfeld	18 January 2012
Amit wants to find out if Yon is possessed by Eco.
127	37	"Episode 37"	Shai Kapon	Shai Alon, Ilan Rosenfeld	19 January 2012
Since Maya has left, Amit wants Noir to become the new Zohar.
128	38	"Episode 38"	Shai Kapon	Shai Alon, Ilan Rosenfeld	22 January 2012
Amit is haunted by Eco.
129	39	"Episode 39"	Shai Kapon	Shai Alon, Ilan Rosenfeld	23 January 2012
Yon wants to convince the others that they need to destroy Eco.
130	40	"Episode 40"	Shai Kapon	Shai Alon, Ilan Rosenfeld	24 January 2012
Yon is possessed by Eco, but Amit finds out who he really is.
131	41	"Episode 41"	Shai Kapon	Shai Alon, Ilan Rosenfeld	25 January 2012
Amit discovers a way to travel between the world of the living and the world of the dead.
132	42	"Episode 42"	Shai Kapon	Shai Alon, Ilan Rosenfeld	26 January 2012
Amit wakes up in the world of the dead and learns about her new abilities.
133	43	"Episode 43"	Shai Kapon	Shai Alon, Ilan Rosenfeld	27 January 2012
Amit refuses to kill Yon, who is possessed by Eco.
134	44	"Episode 44"	Shai Kapon	Shai Alon, Ilan Rosenfeld	30 January 2012
Amit tries to save Yon.
135	45	"Episode 45"	Shai Kapon	Shai Alon, Ilan Rosenfeld	31 January 2012
Yon turns out to be a vampire. He bites Maya.
