= Split (TV series) =

- Promotional poster for the first season of Split. Central character: Ella. Other characters from left to right: Omer, Zohar, Guy, Nicky, Leo
- Genre: Supernatural; Fantasy; Horror; Action; Comedy drama
- Created by: Ilan Rosenfeld, Shira Alon
- Starring: Yon Tumarkin; Amit Farkash; Maya Shoef; Avi Kornick; Yedidia Vital; Anna Zaikin; Idan Ashkenazi; Gal Lev; Alex Ansky; Meir Swisa; Sasha Demidov; Eliana Bekier
- Country of origin: Israel
- No. of seasons: 3
- No. of episodes: 135 (list of episodes)

Production
- Running time: approx. 22 min
- Production company: Dori Media Darset

Original release
- Network: HOT VOD Young; Arutz HaYeladim
- Release: May 28, 2009 – January 31, 2012

Split (Hebrew: חֲצוּיָה, Khatzuya) is an Israeli supernatural drama series. It is directed by Shai Kapon and airs on the HOT VOD Young channel. It is produced by the Dori Media Group through its subsidiary Dori Media Darset (formerly Darset Productions).

== Overview ==
Split is created by Ilan Rozenfeld and Shira Alon. Shai Kapon directs the television series, which is produced by the Dori Media Group for the HO VOD Young channel. Amit Farkash plays the 15-year-old Ella Rosen, who finds out that she is half human and half vampire. Yon Tumarkin supports her as the 600-year-old vampire Leo. The series became the most popular show at the HOT VOD Young Channel. Until January 2010 seven million viewers watched the series. Split became also popular outside of Israel. The Boomerang Channel bought the series and broadcast Split in South America. According to TSN Split was sold to 78 different countries. The first season was filmed within 30 days. They started filming in the middle of February and ended at the beginning of April 2009. Split was influenced by the television series Buffy the Vampire Slayer and True Blood and Stephenie Meyers Twilight series.

== Plot summary ==
=== First Season ===
The series centers around 15-year-old Ella Rosen who begins high school along with her best friend, Omer Teneh. The school is managed by the stone-hearted Amnon Green, who is secretly the head of The Order of Blood, an order founded 1,000 years ago to cleanse the world of vampires.

During the series there are three major plot lines which are all connected:

- First line of action – Tells the story of Ella Rosen (who is involved with all three lines), a confused, introverted teenage girl who is sure that no one who understands her. Ella is a Split – half-vampire and half-human – and has a major part in a conflict between the two races. A 600-year-old vampire (but with the appearance of a high school student) named Leo is sent after her in intention to help her find out who and what she is and what she is destined to do. A love triangle is created between Ella, Leo and Omer, who is secretly in love with her.
- Second line of action - Reveals the story of Zohar, Sushi (Moshe) and Guy (Ella's Brother), who represent the school's fencing team. Guy fancies Zohar, daughter of the principal. Eventually she responds to his advances and they become a couple. Together, they try to help Sushi overcome his stage fright, which leads to a love triangle among the three. When Zohar's father loses his memory, she has to take her father's place as the head of The Order of Blood. Sushi stands by her when Guy is bitten and becomes a vampire which conflicts his relationship with Zohar.
- Third line of action - Reveals the story of the vampires. The Vampires' Prophet (also known as The Blood Chosen, who provides blood replacement and has the authority to make the decision in arguments) is a Split named Ardak, who realizes that his life is about to end and that he has to choose a successor. Phaton, his brother, is about to be crowned, but the coronation is interrupted because of Ardak's vision, which reveals another Split, their younger sister, who was believed to be dead. Ardak sends his guardian, Leo, to find her and tell her about her being a Split. Phaton is angered for not being crowned and he undermines Ardak by a secret mutiny and does severe actions such as incitement against the Prophet, releases prisoners for his own benefit and murdering The Vampire Council members (a council of vampires with the authority to judge and define laws, which has to obey the Blood Chosen's rules).

Nicky (Nurit), is a character who is involved with all three plot lines. In the first one, Nicky befriends Ella, and is willing to listen to Ella's troubles and fears, which helps Ella deal with what she finds out about herself. In the second plot line, Nicky is the one who proves to Zohar that a war against the vampires is not the solution, and that it will not stop the vampires' attacks (a result of a shortage of the blood replacement, following Ardak's death). Plus, Sushi and Nicky become a couple at the end of the season. In the third plot line, Carmel (Leo's past lover) is released by Phaton and possesses Nicky's body, in order to distract Leo from guarding Ella (to overcome Ella, and win the title of the Prophet). Carmel also bites Guy and turns him into a vampire. Later on Leo gets back on the right track and releases Nicky by vanquishing Carmel.

At the end of the season, the vampires are exposed in front of the school's students and staff, and Ella, who is opened up and bolder changes during the season, is presented as the new prophet, in front of the vampires and humans both, during a concert in the school. Amnon thinks he won and wants to kill Ella and eliminate the blood replacement, but backs down after Ella shows him (in a vision) that he should stop the war. According to the vision, Zohar will die if he does not do so. Meanwhile, in The Order of Blood, Zohar (who had already understood that war is not the answer), Guy, Sushi and Nicky seek and find video cassettes which document vampires in order to reveal them to the world and expose the vampires. However, as they try to leave the place, they are interrupted by Tamar, a high-level vampire exterminator, a member of The Order of Blood. Tamar stops them and tries to kill Guy, who is now known as a vampire. According to Ella's vision, which was shown to Amnon, Zohar is shot by Tamar after defending Guy with her body, sacrificing herself. But since Amnon had backed down, another thing happens: Zohar shows Tamar her personal file, which reveals that Tamar's parents got into an exchange of fire between The Order of Blood and vampires, and due to that were killed by the order's fire. Tamar herself survived thanks to a vampire who saved her. Tamar, who always thought that vampires killed her parents, stops the war. The video cassettes are released, and the world is exposed to vampires. At the end of the season, Ella has to choose between Omer and Leo, both in love with her. Ella chooses Omer.
The last scene seems as madness, insanity: Dima, a fencing teacher at the school and also the Guardian of the blood replacement fountain, is shown in the fountain's cave, surrounded with doubles of him in different outfits doing different actions. Dima says "Finally, the end of the blood period has come to an end. Now it's our turn". He repeats the last sentence several times, as he starts to dance around the cave. The rest of the doubles disappear, and the real Dima turns directly to the audience and roars like a lion. This indicates a dramatic change that is probably going to apply in next season.

=== Second Season ===
The season begins with an event that occurred 1,000 years prior to season 2 in the Woods of Green. Ardak fights Lilth, the queen of the demons, and stabs her in the heart with his sword. Once she's killed, all of her demons vanish. Ardak permits letting Lilth's Servant to flee; the Servant is revealed to be Dima.

1,000 years later, a new School year is starting in Green High. Ella decides not to move to Ardak's Tabernacle, and wants live her life like a normal teenager. The situation causes clashes between her and Leo. Meanwhile, Dima discovers the body of Lilth in the fountain's cave and also discovers the cave is full of demons eggs. During an earthquake, one of the eggs hatches and the newly-born demon flees. The target of the demons is to draw vampires' souls, create a stone out of it, and bring it to their queen so she can create new demons.

Soon after the demon flees from the cave, he arrives to Green High, there he draws a vampire's soul which enrolled as a student at the school (demons automatically draw vampires' souls when a vampire is near them) and takes over his identity. From that point forward, the name of the demon is Adam. Adam is not aware of the fact that he is a demon and doesn't know how to control his powers. Adam first meets Ella when he tries to attack her and he discovered he can not do so when she's around.

Ella gets a premonition in which she brings Adam back to life, which later revealed to be an initiative by Dima, who realizes he could bring Lilith back to life with the help of Ella. Dima's soul is poisoned, and Adam, who draws it by Dima's demand, dies. Dima summons Ella to the Cave and she brings Adam back to life. Ella feels there is something different in Adam and takes him under her wing, while trying to figure out what creature he actually is. Dima demands that Adam ingratiate himself with Ella, so when the time comes he'll ask her to use her powers to revive Lilth. If Ella won't do this, Adam will die.

Leo is heartbroken, because Ella chose to be with Omer instead of being with him. Leo is slowly dying. He is fired from his job as the prophet's guardian and attempts to make Ella realize he is her true love, not Omer. In the meantime, Adam continues to draw vampire'ss soul and create stones out of them in a slow and painful process. Jamon, who was a senior in the Vampires' council, is now Ella's advisor and manager of a new nightclub in town (a main location in the season) open exclusively to vampires who prefer to stay away from humans. The humans and the vampires now have secret agreements. According to the agreement the humans will provide blood to the vampires and in exchange the vampires will provide their knowledge to humans.

The human who signs on the agreements with the vampires is Amnon Green. Amnon asks Tamar (who was his assistant in the Order of Blood) to spy for him after Andrea Fox, and old friend of his and a hater of vampires, who owns the box of blood, an ancient box which contains the powers of an ancient vampire. The box can be opened only with the blood of 10 vampires and one Split. Tamar proves to Andre she is loyal to him by "shooting" Amnon, but in fact she warned him before that and Amnon pretends to be in coma in the hospital.

Ella and Omer break up during the season and Ella starts dating Leo. Adam tells Ella he is a demon and she promises him she will protect him. When the vampires discover Adam's true nature, they try to kill him but Ella saves him. Therefore, Leo opens the Box of Blood and is trying to kill Adam with the powers he receives from it. Ella brings Lilith back to life so she could help her save Adam.

Lilth kills Leo after she kisses him and begins producing a new species: new creatures which are half vampire, half demon. Although he is being loyal to Lilth, Dima brings Leo back to life. In the school's gym, Ella fights against Lilth and is about to lose but then Adam draws Lilth's soul, killing her for good. Adam then dies. The new offspring of Lilth hatched and the humans attack them with archery, successfully destroying all of them.

Michael, Ella's foster father, manages to create a new blood replacement for the vampires, and Leo agrees that Ella does not have to move to the tabernacle.

Just when everything seems perfect, the last scene of the season shows us one last offspring has survived and stands in the woods of Green. Her fangs and demon's nails are revealed to the viewers.

=== Third Season: Split – The True Story ===
The third season of Split is a show within a show telling the story of a young group of actors and actresses which is starring in the successful youth-vampire series Split

While filming the second season of Split Yon (who plays Leo) and Amit (who plays Ella) were a couple, Yon turned down an offer of playing the lead-role in a new movie abroad to stay with Amit, Amit thinks she's hunted by ghosts and is freaking out saying Yon is the only one who could save her from the ghosts. Yon, who's confused because of this, breaks up with Amit, Quit his role as Leo in Split and is taking the offer to star in the movie abroad.

A year later the production team is already in the preparations process for the third season of Split. Meni, the producer of Split is casting a new guy named Ruby to play Leo instead of Yon. After Ruby is informed he got the part of Leo he is killed in a car accident and some kind of supernatural personality named "Echo" is taking over his body. Amit who fell in love with Ruby start dating him not knowing he is "Echo".

Meanwhile, Yon started to get signs from Ruby's Ghost who tries to warn him about "Echo". Yon Eventually gets fired from the movie and is returning to Israel, and is managed to get a minor role in Split. Yon is using the Help of Gabi, an actors' agent, who was in a relationship with Meni and also used to be the agent of Yon and all the others actors in Split before they left her, because she believes in mysticism and he is asking her to help him to vanish the ghost (not knowing it is Ruby).

Meanwhile, Amit is not happy with the fact that Yon returned, thinking he did that only to win her back, but on the other hand, her roommate Maya (who plays Zohar) is secretly in love with Yon and she trying to make him ask her out, but he sees her only as a good friend. Meanwhile, "Echo", in the body of Ruby, kills Gabi who tries to vanish him and uses her to vanish the ghost of Ruby before letting her go. Yon is asking Agam (who plays Carmel in Split) to pretend to be his girlfriend so Amit won't think he came back for he, Agam agrees but is slowly falling in love with him. After the ghost of Ruby vanishes Yon realizes he is still in love with Amit.

Yedidia (who plays Omer) is friends with the new actress in Split, Eleanor, despite Danny's (who plays Shahar in Split) anger who is in love with her, and Maya decides to take Eleanor under her wing and is moving in with her. Avi (who plays Guy in Split) and Idan (who plays Sushi in Split) are buying a bar and entitled it "Bracula" (bar+Dracula) [main location in the season]. Alma, Avi's sister, start to work in the bar as a bartender and also start dating with Idan. The three find out there is a homeless named Shaul in the basement of the Bar who is telling them he was a professor who did a research about ghosts and is later revealed to work in a police unit in his past.

== Main characters ==
- Ella Rosen (Amit Farkash) – Ella is a confused girl. She is very shy and sure that nobody understands her. Ella is a Split, the offspring of a vampire and a human. Biological sister of the prophet, Ardak, and Phaton. She is the daughter of Anna, a human mother, and Tevel, a vampire father. She is the adopted sister of Guy. Her birth name is Dinmor. Ella is Prophet Ardak's heiress, destined to be the next Blood chosen (another name for the prophet). She has stage fright, which was caused by the trauma of being kidnapped as a child, in the middle of her performance in front of an audience (she was kidnapped by Amnon Grin and was returned to her parents thanks to Ardak). When Ella meets Leo, She is thrown into the vampire world, a world which she never knew that existed. Omer is secretly in love with her, but she is not aware of that.
- Leopold "Leo" Zachs (Yon Tumarkin) – A 600-year-old vampire with the appearance of a high school student. He is the prophet's guardian. Assigned by Prophet Ardak to tell Ella that she is a Split – half-vampire and half-human. Initially he does not like humans but during the series he warms towards them and eventually falls in love with Ella, which creates a love triangle between Leo, Omer and Ella.
- Omer Teneh (Yedidia Vital) – Ella's weird best friend. He is the first to discover that Leo is a vampire. At first he tries to warn Ella, fight Leo, but eventually he helps Leo with his mission. He tries to make Ella fall in love with Leo, even though he is in love with her. Omer works at a Fantasy Computer Game Store, which is managed and owned by a strange man named Refael.
- Guy Rosen (Avi Kornick) – Ella's little brother, behaves as the older brother. Ella and Guy get along well. Guy is one of the popular kids in school. He defines himself as the "alpha male" of the school. He is in love with Zohar, the principal's daughter. He is also a fencer, a member of the school fencing team. Later in the series he is bitten by Nicki, who is possessed by a vampire named Carmel, which causes him to turn into a vampire.
- Zohar Green (Maya Shoef) – Daughter of the principal, Amnon Grin. She is a popular girl, always in control. Zohar is the state champion in fencing and she is the only girl on the school fencing team. Later in the series she takes after her father and becomes the chief of The Order of Blood, which conflicts with her boyfriend, Guy, becoming a vampire.
- Moshe "Sushi" Arieli (Idan Ashkenazi) – The school bully, but deep inside he is sensitive and thoughtful. He has been Zohar's best friend ever since they were in kindergarten. Sushi is one of the members in the school fencing team. "Sushi" is a nickname which was given to him by Zohar in kindergarten, his true name is "Moshe". During the series he befriends Guy and falls in love with Zohar, and a love triangle is created between the three friends, but eventually he becomes Nicky's boyfriend.
- Nurit "Nicky" Shilon (Anna Zaikin) – A geek who befriends Ella. Nicky is a good person who is not afraid to tell the truth, even when it hurts. Her true name is "Nurit". During the series, Phaton helps Carmel, a punished vampire (she was locked in a mirror), to possess Nicky's body so she can distract Leo from his mission: to protect Ella and help her prepare for her role as the next prophet. When Leo sucks Carmel back to the mirror and Nicky is freed, she gets a makeover and becomes a beautiful girl. Sushi and Nicky become a couple.
- Adam (Lee Biran) – A demon and son of Lilith. He befriends Ella and is protected by her. When the vampires realise that Adam is a demon they want to kill him.

== Minor characters ==
- Ardak (Yussuf Abu Warda) – The vampires' prophet. He is a Split, biological older brother of Ella and Phaton. Ardak provides the vampires with the Doll-Bar, the blood replacement. Ella is his heiress, as was revealed in Ardak's vision. He tries to keep the vision a secret and only tells his guardian, Leo. He is accidentally murdered by members of The Vampire Council, who were chasing after Leo.
- Phaton (Shmil Ben Ari) – A Split, biological brother of Ardak and Ella. He was supposed to be Ardak's heir, but his coronation was interrupted by Ardak's vision (which revealed that Ella is the rightful heiress). Phaton is impatient, and he starts a secret mutiny and incitement against the prophet, releasing vampires prisoners from their mirrors and even murder, mostly of Vampire Council members. He is murdered by Dima, guardian of the Doll-Bar fountain.
- Amnon Green (Alex Ansky) – The school principal, Zohar's father. He is tough and stone-hearted. The headmaster of The Order of Blood, whose purpose is to expose and eliminate vampires. After his memory is erased by vampires several times, he is struck with total amnesia.
- Rafael (Meir Suissa) – A strange man who is interested in fantasy and supernatural such as vampires, trolls and especially aliens. He helps Omer to deal with the vampires world by giving him tips and guidance. Rafael believes he was once kidnapped by aliens.
- Dimitrius "Dima" Golton ||| (Israel (Sasha) Damidov) – The school fencing teacher. At the end of the series Dima is revealed as a knight, the guardian of Doll-Bar fountain. He kills Phaton when he tries to get to the fountain.
- Tamar Biran (Eliana Bekier) – A high level member of The Order of Blood. She believes that a vampire killed her parents when she was little and due to that she hates vampires. At the end of the series she finds out that her parents were killed in an exchange of fire between the order and vampires, which during she was saved by a vampire.
- Sarah Rosen (Rona Lipaz-Michael) - Guy and Ella's mother and the school nurse.
- Michael Rosen (Yoav Hait) - Guy and Ella's father and the school science teacher.
- Shahar Fuchs (Danny Leshman) - A geek. At the beginning of the series he is bitten by a vampire and dies, but he is resuscitated by Ardak. Later in the series he is possessed by a cruel vampire named Hector, who helped Phaton find out about Ella being a Split, but eventually Shahar is freed. He is a computer genius and Sushi tends to use him.
- Lena (Tal Talmon) - A member of The Vampire Council. She accidentally murders Ardak when trying to kill Leo. At the end of the series she attacks Sara (out of thirst), who kills her by stabbing her with a silver knife. She is resuscitated by Ella.
- Jamon (Sharon Alexander) - A member of The Vampire Council. He helps Guy after he becomes a vampire.
- Ethos (Tomer Sharon) - A member of The Vampire Council. He cooperates with Phaton and he is sent to follow Leo. During a fight between Leo and him, Omer draws him into a mirror, which is broken by Phaton, to destroy evidence.
- Yulis (Tal Yarimi) - A member in The Vampire Council. Dead because Adam took his soul.
- Carmel (Agam Rodberg) - Leo's ex-lover, who returns because Phaton releases her from a mirror to distract Leo from his job. She possesses Nicky and behaves wildly while possessing her.
- Noy (Yael Grobglas) - Feisty and inquisitive reporter looking into the affairs of the main characters.
- Lilith (Yana Goor) – Queen of the demons, once defeated by Ardak.
- Anchovy (Gal Lev) – Pupil at Green High. He wants to date Nicky and tries to be like Sushi to get her attention.
- Andrew Fuchs (Gil Frank) – The father of Shahar Fooks and a vampire hunter. A former member of The Order of the Blood.
- Lucy (Noa Wolman) – Lucy works for Andrew Fuchs and is a former member of The Order of the Blood. Later she is dating Ethos.
- Milka Shilon (Odeya Koren) – A psychotherapist and the mother of Nicky.
- Murray (Gore Pipshkeovic) - Murray is a vampire and interested in Nicky. He bites her. Murray is killed by Adam.
- Israel Cole (Amir Fay Guttman) – Israel Cole is a human newsreader. He makes an interview with Murray on television and reveals that there are vampires on earth.
- Shanti (Yael Tal)

== Inactive characters ==
- Arthur Green – Founder of Green School, Amnon's grandfather and leader of The Order of the Blood in the past.
- Tevel – Vampire. Father of Ardak, Phaton and Ella, who discovered the Doll-Bar.
- Anna – The human mother of Ardak, Phaton and Ella.
- Timna Green – Her maiden name was Kagan, the ex-wife of Amnon and mother of Zohar.
- Judge Arieli – Father of Moshe (Sushi) is a judge by profession.
- Héctor – A very dangerous vampire who is freed from his "prison" by Phaton, the first time he is liberated he possesses the body of Shahar Fooks to kill Leo. After Shahar, he leaves the body and takes the body of a tourist, then possesses the body of Yulis (board member) and is finally killed by Leo.
- Agememnón Green-Wood – He founded The Order of the Blood when his wife was bitten by a vampire in 1000 AD, and vowed to rid the world of vampires. Green-Wood founded the dynasty. Amnon Green was named on his behalf.

== Vampires ==
There are two types of vampires: those who are born vampires and humans who were bitten by vampires. Vampires are described as handsome, very intelligent and talented. According to Amnon, being a vampire is against the laws of nature, although this has yet to be confirmed. Vampires have many strengths, but also weaknesses and vulnerabilities. Also, vampires must drink human blood or Doll-Bar to sustain their health; if they abstain from either for too long, they will die.

Powers

- Memory erasure – Vampires can erase several minutes of a person's memory. Multiple erasures can cause someone to lose their memory entirely. However, it is possible to regain memories that have been erased (e.g., Amnon Grin).
- Telepathy – Vampires can hear the minds of humans and vampires. However, wearing a hat makes a person immune to a vampire's telepathy. Vampires can also sense other vampires.
- Super Speed – Vampires can move at much higher velocities than any human, to the point of becoming nothing but a blur, if even, to human eyesight.
- Super Agility – Vampires can jump incredible heights and distances. They are flexible and possess very sharp reflexes.
- Super Strength – Vampires possess vastly superhuman strength and can easily overpower any human.
- Super Durability – Vampires can endure and survive much more damage and physical trauma than humans, however enough damage will kill them.
- Healing Factor – Vampires can quickly heal any non-fatal injury. It is unknown whether they can regrow lost organs, however it was implied they can.
- Immortality – Vampires can potentially live indefinitely. Born vampires don't age beyond their physical prime, while turned vampires don't age at all.

Weaknesses

- Silver Daggers – A silver dagger to the heart causes instantaneous death to vampires.
- Garlic – Suffocates vampires. Bullets containing garlic are supposedly fatal for vampires (unconfirmed).
- Rice – Throwing rice at a vampire puts them into a trance in which they are forced stop and count each grain. However, they can be released from said trance if someone speaks to them and tells them to stop.
- Enchanted Mirrors – Special, enchanted mirrors from the destroyed ancient vampire temple are dangerous for vampires; if presented against a vampire, such mirror will suck in the vampire's soul, imprisoning it within the mirror and incapacitating the vampire. As long as the mirror is intact, the soul can be restored to the vampire, reviving them. Breaking the mirror causes the vampire's soul to "break", permanently incapacitating (however not outright killing) the vampire. The Prophet however can restore the soul of a vampire incapacitated such, as long as the body is intact.
- Heartbreak – If vampires have their heart broken due to lost love, they fade and eventually will die.
- Water – Water weakens vampires, but does not hurt them.
- Spells – Special spells are designed to protect humans from vampires.
- Blood Lilies – Not so much a weakness as it is a warning to humans. If a vampire is near a Blood Lily, the lily dies (the stem visibly curls), thus revealing vampire to humans (supposedly extinct, the Blood Lily is an endangered flower).
- Demons – Demons are the natural enemies of vampires; they can absorb vampire souls, which they then regurgitate as gemstones. Their queen, Lilith, can use these gemstones to create new demons.

== Concepts ==
- Split – A being born from a human and a vampire. The Split have powers as well. One Split is the product of the connection between vampires and humans.
- Vampire – A non-human creature with special powers and weaknesses.
- Demon – A non-human with special powers and weaknesses. Hates vampires and absorbs their souls through special, long claws.
- The Vampire Council – a group of vampires responsible for maintaining the world of vampires and decide on penalties for vampires who have defied them. They enforce the Laws of Blood. The Council is shown meeting in a museum.
- Prophet – Also known as Blood Chosen. The prophet must be a Split, and there can only be one at a time. They have the ability to communicate with humans and vampires at the same time. The prophet also has the ability to profess the ability to split. The Prophet is the spiritual leader of all vampires.
- The Order of Blood – A group of human beings whose sole aim is the destruction of all vampires in the world. The leader of the Order of the Blood is the principal of the School Grin, Amnon Grin. Orders must come from the Grin leader. The Order was founded 1,000 years ago, when a vampire mercilessly attacked the Grin Dynasty, and the Head swore revenge on the vampires.
- Doll-Bar – A substitute for blood, like human blood. Aradak's and Phaton's father, Tevel, found the source of the blood substitute. Doll-Bar can even slow the aging of humans, enlogating their life. The effect of the Doll-Bar on Splits is that it augments their red blood cells, but some of the augmented red blood cells are occasionally destroyed in a few minutes. Thus, sometimes, consumption of Doll-Bar can cause long-term damage to Splits.
- Tabernacle – The seat of the Prophet, a human person can not enter the tabernacle, in which case the Tabernacle causes an earthquake and destroyed.
- Laws of Blood – Are the laws that vampires have to obey. For example, the rule states that if a vampire bites a human, this will result in punishment and imprisonment (usually imprisonment for hundreds of years), even in the killing was in self-defense. After the death of Aradak Chosen Blood, the Council, which among other things, is the legislative authority of the vampire, adjourned. After the dispersal, the laws were enforced no more. It was determined that a vampire can afford to bite because it is a necessity.
- Blood Box – A box with the image of power and the world's most powerful vampire. In order to open the Blood Box, the blood of 10 vampires and 1 Split is required.

== International Broadcast ==
Country	Network	Local Title
Azerbaijan	Lider TV	Split
Israel	Hot VOD Young; Arutz HaYeladim	חֲצוּיָה
Argentina; Brazil; Chile	Boomerang	Split
Mexico	Boomerang; Once TV México	Split
Portugal	SIC K	Split
Brazil	SBT	Split
Philippines	TV5; TeleAsia	Split
Russia	Muz-TV	Сплит
Vietnam	VBC	Split
Colombia	Boomerang; Caracol TV	Split
Italy	Rai Gulp and 7 Gold	Split
Poland	iTV	Split
Costa Rica	Canal 9	Split
Venezuela	Televen	Split

== Ukrainian Remake ==
In 2011 a Ukrainian remake of the Israeli series was filmed. Split (Ukrainian: Спліт, Russian: Сплит) is the first Ukrainian production about vampires. The series was filmed in St. Petersburg. Vlad Lanna is the director of Split. The main actors are Kristina Brodskaya, Artem Krylov, Maksim Salnikov, Igor Mirkurbanov and Mariya Akhmetzyanova. On 17 October 2011 the first episode was broadcast on TET. The series consists of 40 Episodes, which are 25 minutes long.

The Ukrainian series is about the war between humans and vampires which has been ongoing for centuries. The vampire prophet tries to mediate between the humans and vampires. Since the prophet Ardak has become very old he is looking for a successor. He findes the 16-year-old Split Leah. Leah is a shy girl. She is studying arts and doesn't know about the supernatural world. So Ardak sends the 428-year-old vampire Kai as a student to the art college. Kai wants to protect Leah and prepare her for her fate as the vampire prophet. Leah and Kai instantly fall in love with each other. However their love is forbidden by both the human and vampire laws. If they break these laws they will lose all their supernatural powers. So they have to make a difficult choice, should they either listen to their hearts or to their minds.

=== Actors and Characters in comparison ===
Character (Israel)	Actor (Israel)	Character (Ukraine)	Actor (Ukraine)
Ella Rozen	Amit Farkash	Leah Rosanow	Kristina Brodskaya
Leopold 'Leo' Zachs	Yon Tumarkin	Lee Kai	Artem Krylov
Nurit 'Nicky' Shilon	Anna Zaikin	Leah Willow	Maria Antonova
Omer Teneh	Yedidya Vital	Anton Kutusow	Maksim Salnikov
Guy Rozen	Avi Kornick	Luke Rosanow	Dmitriy Panfilov
Zohar Grin	Maya Shoef	Maya Odintsova	Mariya Akhmetzyanova
Moshe "Sushi" Arieli	Idan Ashkenazi	Max	Ilyya Shidlovskiy
Ardak	Yussuf Abu-Warda	Ardak	Vladimir Markov
Phaton	Shmil Ben Ari	Manfred	Igor Mirkurbanov
Rafael	Meir Swisa	Rafael	Oleg Garkusha

== See also ==
- List of vampire television series
