= Pinhas and Sons =

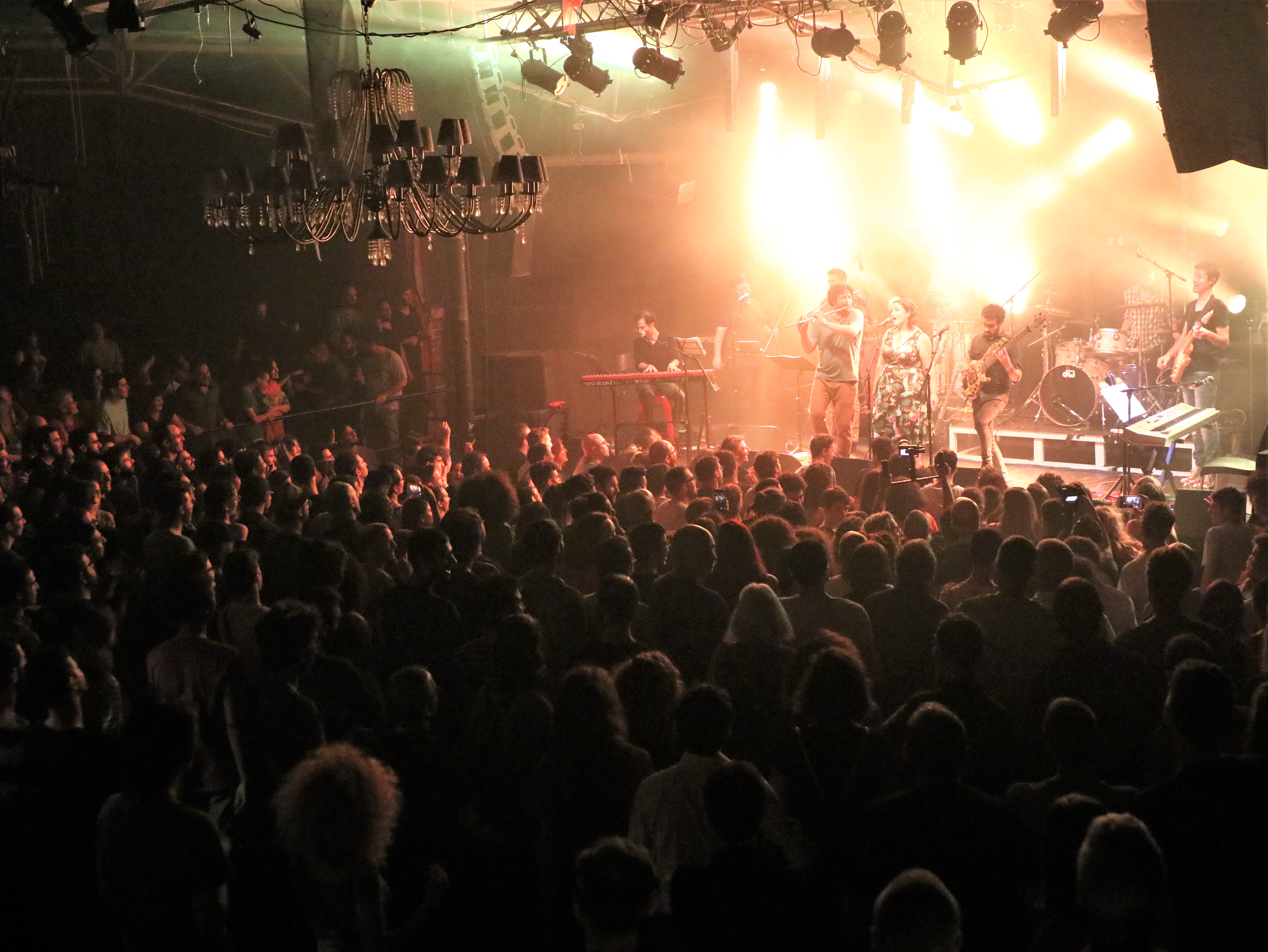
Pinhas and Sons live at the Barby (club), June 2019. Photographed by Rona.a

Pinhas and Sons (Hebrew: פנחס ובניו) is 9-member, multi-ensemble Israeli fusion band led by Ofer Pinhas, featuring Noa Karadavid on lead vocals. Their music combines elements ranging between progressive rock and Levantine folk music (including songs in Arabic). The group underwent several iterations beginning in 2007, until finally emerging under the Pinhas and Sons name in 2015.

Pinhas and Sons has released two main albums: Cheap Metaphors Of Love in 2014 and About An Album in 2018. Also in 2018, they released an album called "Baby Pinhas," featuring softened instrumentals of some of their original tacks, intended to be listened to by infants. They have also collaborated with several prominent Israeli musical performers, such as: Shlomo Gronich, Guy Mazig, Daniel Zamir, Ester Rada, Din Din Aviv, and others.
