= Yon Tumarkin =

Israeli actor and singer

- יון תומרקין
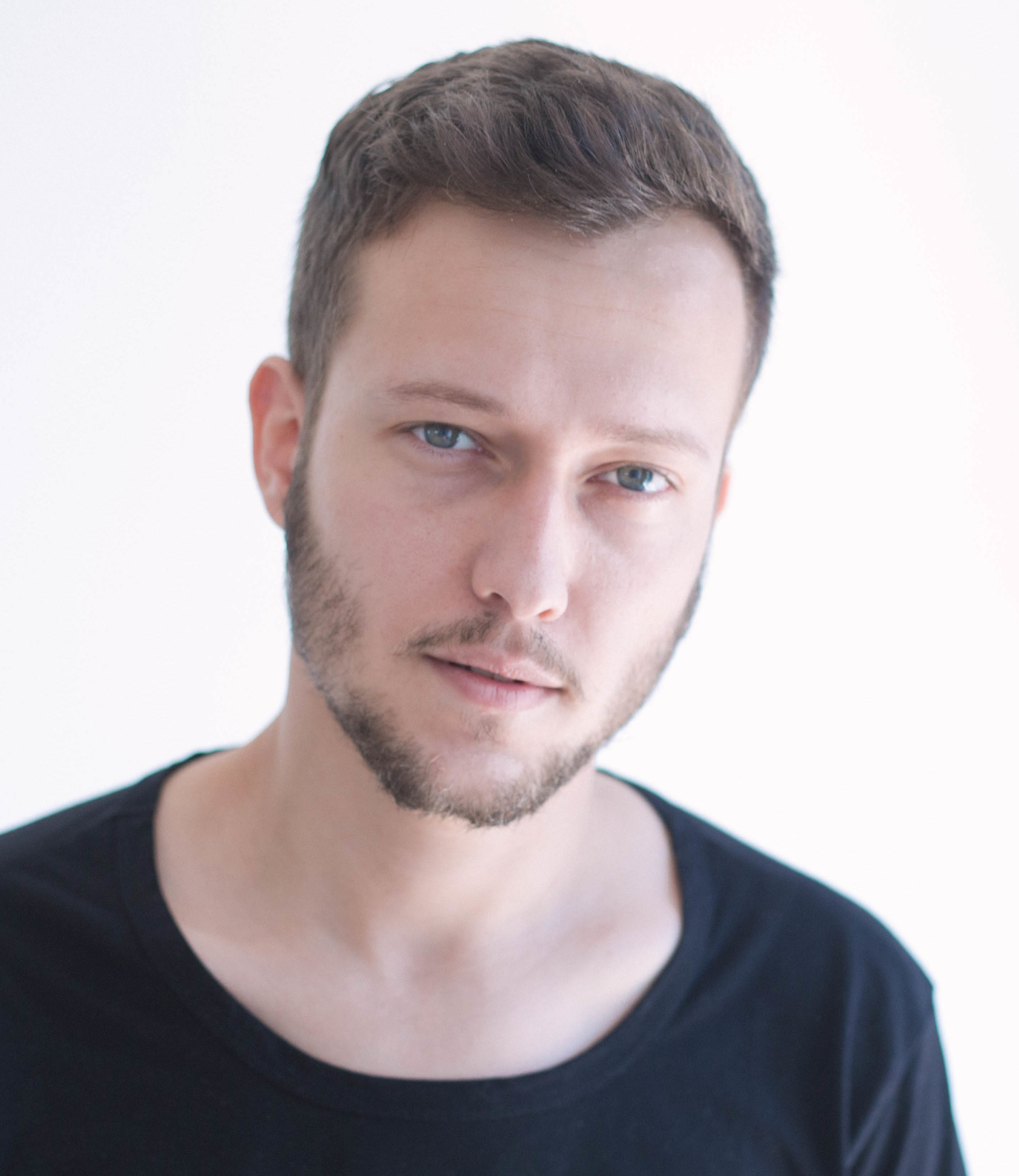
- Yon Tumarkin
- Born: 22 July 1989 (age 37); Jaffa, Israel
- Other name: Yon Tomarkin
- Occupation: Actor
- Years active: 1999–present
- Relatives: Yigal Tumarkin (father); Martin Hellberg (grandfather)

Yon Tumarkin (Hebrew: יון תומרקין; born 22 July 1989) is an Israeli male actor and singer, best known for playing Leo in the TV series Split.

== Early life ==
Tumarkin was born and raised in Jaffa, Israel, to a family of Jewish descent. He is the youngest son of Naama Tumarkin and artist Yigal Tumarkin. His paternal grandfather was German actor Martin Hellberg, whose father was a pastor. When he was 13, his parents were divorced and he and his mother moved to Tel Aviv. There he went to the high school Tichon Ironi Alef and got the diploma of Art. On August 18, 2008, he took a break from the army for his television work. In 2011, Yon Tumarkin finished his work in the Israeli army.

== Career ==
By the age of eight, Tumarkin was discovered by casting director Yael Aviv when sitting in a cafe with his father. The next day, Tumarkin went to his first audition. During his childhood, Tumarkin appeared in many different TV commercials. He got his first bigger acting job at the age of ten in the TV film Who stole the show? (Hebrew: מי גנב את ההצגה). At the age of twelve, he appeared in the film Shisha Million Rasism. He played a mute child and Holocaust survivor. From there, his career took off with a leading role in a TV series called Ha-Yeladim Mi'Givat Napoleon (Napoleon Hills Kids). In 2009, Tumarkin sang "Power of Thought" at the Festigal and won the second place for his performance of the song. In the same, year he co-starred with Amit Farkash in the TV series Split playing Leo Zachs, a 600-year-old Vampire who looks like a teenager. The series was a huge success in Israel and was sold to 78 different countries. From 2009 until 2012, Tumarkin was awarded four times in a row with Israeli Television Academy Award as the best actor.

In 2012, he played a main role in the award-winning Israeli drama film Rock the Casbah. In 2014, Yon Tumarkin got a main role in the TV series The Nerd Club.

In 2015, Tumarkin starred along Yael Grobglas and Danielle Jadelyn in JeruZalem, an English-speaking Israeli horror film.

In 2016, Tumarkin appeared in the Israeli child series Susey Pere (Wild Horses) as Libby Yahav. In the same year it was announced that Tumarkin was cast in the TV series "המלאך השומר שלי" (My Guardian Angel). The series deals with a group of adolescents who all have their own guardian angel.

In 2018, he played the graphic designer Reuben in an episode of the British crime series McMafia.

== Personal life ==
During the filming of Split, Tumarkin met Amit Farkash, and the two of them began dating. After their break up, Tumarkin dated the model Alexa Tamari. However, their relationship ended in August 2014. Tumarkin lives in Ramat Gan.

== Filmography ==
=== Film ===
Year	Title	Role	Notes
2001	Shisha Million Rasisim	Adam	
2010	2048	Yuji San	
2012	Rock the Casbah	Tomer	
2013	Sassi Keshet Never Eats Falafel	Ido	Short
2013	Bitter Lemon	Guy on scooter	Short
2015	JeruZalem	Kevin Reed	
2017	29	Ron	Short
2017	Mo'adon ha'khnounim: ha'seret	Oren Tuna	

=== Television ===
Year	Title	Role	Notes
2001–2003	Napoleon Hills Kids	Ido Klein	Lead role
2007–2009	The Island	Dylan/Tomi	Lead role
2008	Hasufim	Alkna Raziel	Episode 9: At the Desk
2009–2011	Split	Leopold 'Leo' Zachs / Yon	
2011	Simaney She'ela	Aharon	
2012	Tanoochi	Amnon	
2013	The Arbitrator (Season 4)	Nir	
2014	The Nerd Club	Oren tuna	
2016	Susey Pere	Libby Yahav	
2018	McMafia	Reuben	Episode #1.5
