= Tzofei Tel Aviv =

Israeli musical group related to Hebrew Scouts

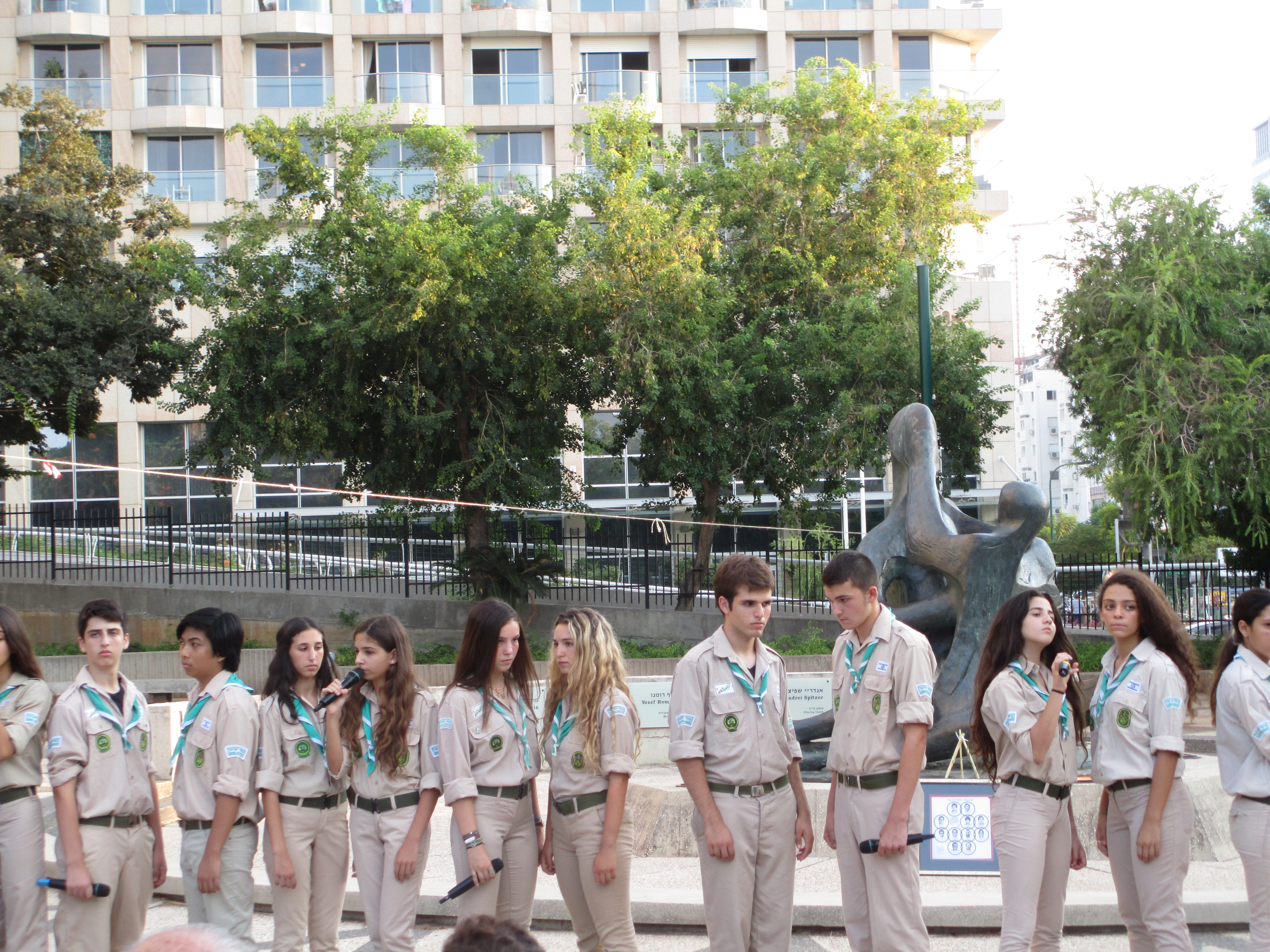
Tzofei Tel Aviv at a Munich massacre memorial, Tel Aviv, 2013

Tzofei Tel Aviv (or Tel Aviv Scouts Band in English, Hebrew: להקת צופי תל אביב) is a musical group originating from Israel. The band consists of about 20 singers from the Hebrew Scouts Movement in Tel Aviv, Israel. The performers are teenagers, aged 15 to 18 years old.

== History ==
The Tel Aviv Scouts Band has been active since 1978. In its early days, most of the band’s programs dealt with the city of Tel Aviv and the Scouting experiences, but over the years they expanded their scope and dealt with democracy and self-realization, trying to convey social and national messages in their performances.

Every year, the band participates in about 70 national events, city events in Tel Aviv, various festivals, and various events of the Scout Movement. In addition to the regular musical program, which is renewed every year, the band has a rich repertoire of Israeli songs with which it performs on stages at various events. Their songs are known for their catchy melodies and meaningful lyrics, making them popular among various age groups in Israel.

The band used to perform in the eighties in a weekly regular corner in the program “Zehu Ze!”, and also appeared in the special program of the show “This is Democracy” and in the mini-series of 5 episodes “It’s All a Show” on the network and more.

Since 2004, the band has put on many musicals with a plot, such as: “Life for Example”, “Children of Life” - based on the songs of Shalom Hanoch, “1976”, “Not in Control”, “The Band”, “On the Roofs of Tel Aviv” and more.

== Performances Abroad ==
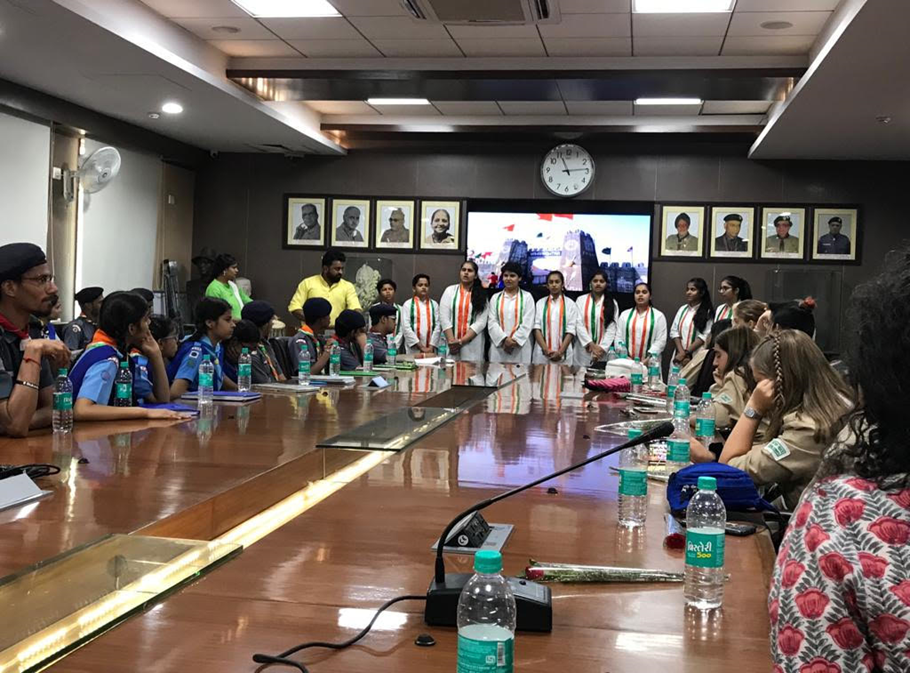
Tzofei Tel Aviv visiting the Bharat Scouts in India

Every year, the band goes on performances abroad, representing Tel Aviv-Yafo in front of Jewish and non-Jewish communities while representing the city. In recent years, the band has performed in China, Peru, Ecuador, the United States, Mexico, Canada, Britain, Puerto Rico, Singapore, Vietnam, Thailand, Australia and Spain.

For example, they performed Yom Ha'atzmaut concerts in Lima and Guayaquil in June 2003, as they did in St. Louis Park, MN, in 2006. The group's musical director is Moishele Yosef, who has various other jobs in the musical profession.

== Legacy ==
Over the years, the Tzofei Tel Aviv Band has made a significant impact on Israeli music. Many of their songs have become classics, sung around campfires and in schools across the country. The band continues to perform and inspire new generations of Israelis with their music.

Among the band’s graduates are Sharon Haziz, Ayelet Zurer, Din Din Aviv, Tomer Sharon, Yarden Bar-Kochba, Avital Pasternak, Uri Gottlieb, Gilad Kalter, Maya Shoaf, Idan Ashkenazi, Lior Ashkenazi, Yehuda Yitzhakov, Matan Shavit, Eliana Tidhar, Shira Levi, Liam Pinto and other artists in the Israeli entertainment world.
