= Shir La'Ahava =

Single by Gaya
- Released: 1999
- Recorded: 1999
- Genre: Israeli pop and folk
- Length: 4:36
- Songwriters: Ayelet Tzioni & Gili Liber

"Shir La'Ahava" (Hebrew שיר לאהבה) also known as "Yachad" (Hebrew יחד) is a song by Israeli band Gaya. The vocals are sung by band member Din Din Aviv, who later joined the Israeli music group, Idan Raichel Project, and was the lead singer on the hit song Im Telech (If You Leave). She has since moved on to solo projects. The lyrics of Shir La'Ahava promote optimism, love and unity. It received the Discovery of the Year Award and has become an unofficial second national anthem for many Israelis.

== Lyrics ==
-Hebrew יחד לב אל לב נפתח ונראה ת'אור שבשמיים יחד לב אל לב נפתח בתקווה לאהבה

איך שהלב נפתח חובק את העולם ובקריאה גדולה לשיר לאהבה

אימרו הכל אפשר זה לא מאוחר השחר כבר עלה זמן לאהבה

יחד לב אל לב נפתח ונראה ת'אור שבשמיים יחד לב אל לב נפתח בתקווה לאהבה

ורק אם נאמין ובלי שום דאווין בדרך העולה זה שיר לאהבה

-English

Together, heart to heart, we'll open up and see the light in the sky. Together, heart to heart, we'll open up with hope for love.

As the heart opens up, it embraces the world, and with a great big shout to sing for love.

Say: everything's possible, it is not too late, the dawn has risen already (it's) time for love.

Together, heart to heart we'll open, and we'll see the light in the sky. Together, heart to heart we'll open with hope - for love.

And if we only believe, no mucking around, on the road coming up, it's a song for love.

Together...

-- Yachad - lev el lev niftach venir'e, ta'or shebashamayim Yachad - lev el lev niftach betikva - la'ahava.

Ech shehalev niftach, chovek et ha'olam uvikriya g'dolah lashir la'ahava.

Imru hakol efshar, ze lo me'uchar, hashachar kvar ala, (zeh) zman la'ahava.

Yachad - lev el lev niftach venir'e, ta'or shebashamayim Yachad - lev el lev niftach betikva - la'ahava.

Verak im na'amin, uvli shum da'awin, baderech ha'ola, zeh shir la'ahava.

Yachad.
