= HaShminiya =

- Genre: Drama; Science fiction
- Created by: Giora Chamizer
- Directed by: Ruby Duenyas
- Starring: Yedidia Vital; Hili Yalon; Adi Himelbloy; Dawn Lenny-Gabay; Danny Leshman; Michael Aloni (season 1–3); Shira Vilensky; Avi Kornick; Limor Atias-Bashan (season 2–5); Tal Mosseri; Dor Zweigenboim(season 1–4); Edith Hatzor (season 1–3); Tuval Shafir (season 1–3)
- Theme music composer: Danny Reichenthal
- Opening theme: Season 1–3: "Mul Kol HaOlam" by Liron Lev; Season 4–5: "Mul Kol HaOlam" by Or Taragan
- Country of origin: Israel
- Original language: Hebrew
- No. of seasons: 5
- No. of episodes: 212

Production
- Producers: Nava Kolton; Einat Zilber-Damari
- Editors: Hen Kliman; Dafna Maman
- Running time: approx. 25 minutes
- Production company: Tedy Productions

Original release
- Network: Arutz HaYeladim (HOT)
- Release: 5 June 2005 – 2 February 2007
- Release: 29 September 2013 – 22 July 2014

HaShminiya (Hebrew: הַשְּׁמִינִיָּה; The Eight) is a television series that was broadcast on the Israeli channel Arutz HaYeladim in HOT. Although the show was designated for children and teenagers, it was also popular with adults. The TV series was split into two parts: The Eight (seasons 1-3, 2005-2007) and The Eight – The Next Generation (seasons 4-5, 2013-2014).

The series won the Israeli Television Academy Award for Best Children and Youth's Series in 2006 and 2007.

== Seasons ==
=== Season 1 ===
Amos Dvir, Avner HaLevy and Roberto, three scientists, investigate cerebral energy called "The Lambda Ripples". They want to have an experiment that will involve six gifted kids. However, Avner and Amos decide to delay it for a few years. Disappointed, Roberto co-operates with Lilly Dvir, Amos's wife, and the two conduct the experiment on Amos and Lilly's children, three-year-old Maya and Jonathan. The experiment doesn't work and explodes, but the kids stay alive. Roberto goes to jail for six years and Lilly leaves Israel after divorcing Amos.

The show fast forwards to seven years later. Amos is dying of cancer, so he decides to grow his children into adolescence – to the age of fifteen with his machine Turbo-Time, which can change age, and changes their names to Aya and Nini. Avner raises a project for gifted students and Amos is asking him to attach Aya and Nini to the project. Amos leaves to medical treatments in Switzerland, while Aya and Nini think he's dead.

Avner forms "The Octette" and recruits eight gifted students to investigate the ripples. In addition to the Dvir twins, the octette also includes Mika Shaked (a skilled pianist), Avi Moskovich (a computer genius), Dori Feingold (a technical mastermind), Natasha Segovia (a skilled painter), Roni Malki (a genius mathematician) and Adam HaLevy (a language expert who's also Avner's son). In addition to solving riddles and saving the countries and themselves from hostile forces, the octette acts like a typical class with loves and friendships. Surprisingly, Lilly comes back from abroad to raise her children. At the same time, she and Roberto co-operate and follow the project to avenge Amos and Avner.

A substitute teacher named Daddy joins the school and begins a relationship with Dganit, the octette class's teacher. At the same time Lilly gains control of the project and is ready to use the octette like batteries and pump the lambda energy from them. Lilly threatens the octette, almost kills Adam and Dganit, goes to jail and disappoints her two children. Aya and Nini are shocked to find out that their father is alive, and he is a person that they have known so far as their history teacher – Daddy. In spite of the project's success, Avner and Dganit decide to end it because of the risk to the students and a possible public exposure of the project. The students are scattered in couples in the school's classes. Dganit and her son Ben-Ben move to Dedi, Nini and Aya's house. The season ends when Nini returns to be Jonathan.

=== Season 2 ===
The second season opens at the superior court, where Daddy and Avner stand trial for illegally using children. They are on the verge of insanity, but the testimony of Yair Noam, the prime minister (who had headed the project as the energy minister) leads to their acquittal. Daddy, Dganit and Avner start a new project, this time with state approval. The prime minister sets up an elaborate watch tower at the top of the Azrieli Towers, where they can work undisturbed. The ostensible reason is solving some of the country's problems, but in fact, the state is trying to use their lambda energy. The project is well funded by the prime minister and his assistant, Muli Noam.

Nini decides to be 15 again and Aya visits Lilly in jail and follows her to Patmos, her asylum. The plane to Patmos crashes and it is assumed that Aya has died in the crash, although no corpse is found. At the same time, Dganit meets an orphaned girl named Nitzan and adopts her. Nitzan sleeps in Aya's room and starts to spend time with the group. At first, she's dating Dori, but finally she's dating Adam, after he reconciles himself with Aya's death. Avner recognizes lambda ripples in Nitzan too and she joins the project, instead of Aya. At the same time, the viewer is shown that Aya is not dead, but in a desert in the middle of nowhere.

Aya discovers that she had been kidnapped by Muli Noam, and confronts him. Muli is a member of a sect named "Scorpio", a destructive sect that wants to spread their ideas using the lambda ripples and seeks to dominate the world. The sect tries to pump Aya's energy and even threatens to hurt Adam's sister, Rotem. Later, they kidnap Daddy. At the same time, Daniel Harris, a 19-year-old millionaire, enters Natascha and Roni's life. He dates Roni and taking Natascha as an apprentice artist under his patronage. However, he is a member of Scorpio. Just before the season ends, it is revealed that Lilly is also a member of the sect. She saves her ex-husband and daughter, Daddy and Aya, but goes to jail again.

The sect members kidnap the octette and bring them into the temple where Aya, Daddy and Lilly are held. Daddy shoots Muli and all the sect members who remain alive are arrested by the police, except Daniel, who escapes. The octette members, and especially Adam, are shocked to see Aya alive. Aya comes back home, but she is broken-hearted and feels uncomfortable around her friends. Nitzan moves to Roni's house, instead of Roni's sister, Elli, who flies to London as an MTV emissary. Dganit tells Daddy that she is pregnant.

=== Season 3 ===
The third season starts in Mika's aunt's villa during the summer holidays. After a strange guest comes to the villa, everyone in the octette, except Aya, joins the police's secret organization called "The Council". Aya prefers to spend her summer holidays helping pregnant Dganit and reading books. The octette introduces itself to Alex, Lilly's sister and the head of "The Council", and the three procurators, Yoel, Dafi (the strange guest), and Omri. At the same time, Avi, who becomes the leader of the octette, breaks up with Mika and moves into Chekhov's place. Chekhov is an old friend and also a member of "The Council". Avi doesn't know that he was chosen to be commander because of his relationship with Chekhov. Roni and Nini get back together, and Nitzan and Adam maintain their relationship, although Adam still has feelings for Aya.

At the same time Dganit's doctor, Calderon, arouses suspicion in Aya, and it is exposed that he was Julius Berger, the doctor of all the octette members' mothers, when they were pregnant. Julius combines Daniel Harris and Lina, who has escaped jail, and together they try to get the Crypton gene, the gene that makes a human with lambda ripples—a physically perfect human. The three kidnap Nini and make Daniel look and hear like him, something he takes advantage of to kill Yoel (one of the agents in the council) and incriminate Roni and Natasha in his death. However, Aya eventually discovers the truth and Daniel escapes, fights with Nini and gets burned in his face by sulfuric acid. Julius shoots Lina to death and lets Nini go, afterwards he implements the Crypton gene in Daniel's body.

Julius exposes that he injected a deadly virus to Dganit and her twins, so she would die in birth unless she gets the antivirus. Dganit is saved nevertheless due to an implementation from Nitzan, who turns out to be Julius's daughter (so her blood has the antivirus). The octette and the newborn twins get kidnapped by Julius and Daniel. They are found by Avner accompanied by Aya and Nitzan. Avner takes away the twins, then once Daniel shoots Julius he instructs the nonet to condense all of their lambda energy towards Daniel, so he dies from an overdose of lambda energy.

In the last episode of the season, the council wants to extract lambda energy in order to create an army of undefeated soldiers. Unwilling to cooperate, the octette looks for a way to get rid of their lambda ripples. With help from Lilly (who received a permanent pardon after delivering the council information about Julius and Daniel), Daddy and Avner decide to erase the lambda ripples from the octette's minds, in a way that also gets all their memories from their previous 2 years erased as well. The season ends with sights of the different octette students passing around in the school without recognising each other.

=== Season 4 and 5 ===
The fourth season (unofficially known as HaShminiya: The Next Generation) starts seven years after the end of Season 3. After receiving a mail from Avner HaLevy, saying that their memory was wiped. He also tells that he couldn't wipe the memory of his own son, Adam, and that he lived all-alone until he died, though it is suspected that he was murdered. He tells the remain seven - Natascha, Roni, Dori, Nini, Aya, Mika and Avi - that they have a mission - they have to find and train all-new six teenagers - Raphael, Hagar, Yotam, Gilli, Dennis and Leia.

Tamar and Yaron Dvir, Aya and Nini's siblings, are seven years old, and are home-schooled by tablets and LSRs - and Avshalom, the new villain, using their lamda for his new corporation - "Good Thoughts cop". This corporation has very few workers - and apparently, Nitzan is one of them.

The fourth season was split into two parts: Season 4 (24 episodes) and Season 5 (23 episodes).

== Characters ==
=== The Octette (Nonet) ===
- Yedidia Vital as Jonathan "Nini" Dvir
- Hili Yalon as Maya "Aya" Dvir
- Michael Aloni as Adam HaLevy (seasons 1-3)
- Adi Himelbloy as Natasha Segovia
- Dawn Lenny-Gabay as Roni Malki
- Danny Leshman as Dori Feingold
- Shira Vilensky as Mika Shaked
- Avi Kornick as Avi Moskovich
- Limor Atias-Basham as Nitzan Romano/Berger (seasons 2-5)

=== Other important characters ===
- Tal Mosseri as Amos "Daddy" Dvir
- Liat Bein as Lilly Dvir (seasons 1-3)
- Dor Zweigenboim as Avner HaLevy (seasons 1-3, guest in season 4)
- Edith Hatzor as Dganit Dror (seasons 1-3)
- Tuval Shafir as Ben-Ben Dror (seasons 1-3)
- Maya Koren as Rotem HaLevy (seasons 1-2, guest in season 3)
