= Rock the Casbah (2012 film) =

- Promotional release poster
- Directed by: Yariv Horowitz
- Written by: Guy Meirson; Yariv Horowitz
- Produced by: Leon Edery; Moshe Edery; Adam Leibovitz; Cyrille Perez; Gilles Perez; Paul Saadoun; Ilan Sagiv; Michael Sharfstein
- Starring: Yon Tumarkin; Yotam Ishay; Roy Nik; Iftach Rave; Henry David; Lavi Zitner; Shmulik Chelben; Khaula Al Haji-Daibsi; Adel Abou Raya
- Cinematography: Amnon Zlayet
- Edited by: Isaac Sehayek
- Music by: Assaf Amdursky
- Release dates: 7 July 2012 (Jerusalem Film Festival); 21 February 2013 (Israel)
- Running time: 94 minutes
- Country: Israel
- Language: Hebrew

Rock the Casbah (Hebrew: רוק בקסבה) is a 2012 Israeli war drama film co-written and directed by Yariv Horowitz.

== Title ==
The title is drawn from a punk rock song, "Rock the Casbah", that was wildly popular among young Israelis at the time.

== Synopsis ==
A unit of new recruits sent to patrol Gaza during the First Intifada in 1989. A washing machine is deliberately pushed from the roof of a building as the patrol moves past, killing one of the soldiers. The perpetrator cannot be found. Four of the young soldiers are assigned to uncomfortable, boring, surveillance duty atop the roof, interacting with the Arab family that lives in the building.

There is a dual focus lives in fear of being accused of collaborating with the Israeli soldiers, and on the young soldiers: sensitive, clean-cut Tomer (Yon Tumarkin); Haim (Iftach Rave) whose crude complaining about the food and his intestinal distress gives the film some laughs; feisty, hotheaded Aki (Roy Nik) who challenges the group's leader, marijuana-smoking Ariel (Yotam Ishay), who will muster out of his mandatory army service if he survives the next few weeks.

== Cast ==
- Yon Tumarkin as Tomer
- Yotam Ishay as Ariel
- Roy Nik as Aki
- Iftach Rave as Haim
- Henry David as Ilya
- Lavi Zitner as Izac
- Shmulik Chelben as Israel
- Khaula Al Haji-Daibsi as Samira
- Adel Abou Raya as Muchamad
- Or Ben-Melech
- Angel Bonanni
- Abdallah El Akal
- Vladimir Freedman
- Ofer Ruthenberg

== Critical reception ==
Rock the Casbah won the Berlin International Film Festival's C.I.C.A.E. award in 2013.

Jordan Hoffman of Film.com called the film "worth seeing and discussing" and gave it 7.3 out of 10, noting that it "succinctly expresses just how difficult and intractable the Israeli–Palestinian conflict is", and that "it is essential to encourage films that do not demonize the individuals on either side of the conflict." Another reviewer rated the film 4 stars out of 5 and remarked that it is "thoughtful in its representation of thoughtlessness, and curiously poetic". However, Dan Fainaru of Screen Daily argued that the film "attempts to offer an even-handed portrait of their confrontation with the Arab population, but ends up as an impressionistic report rather than a full scale dramatic experience", and Alissa Simon of Variety added that "the script fails to offer something viewers haven’t seen before."
