= Gilad Kleter =

Israeli voice actor

- גלעד קלטר
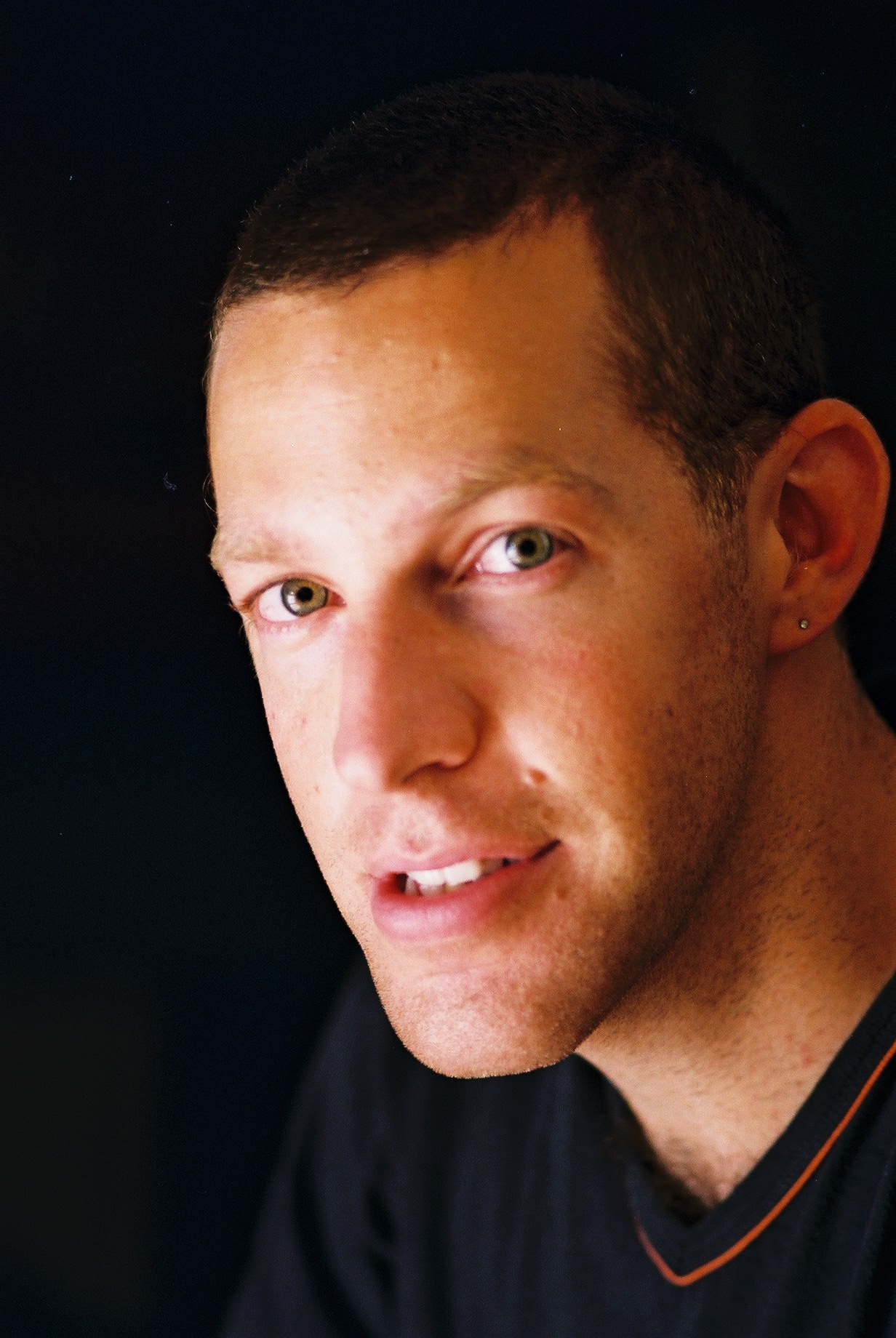
- Born: 2 April 1976 (age 50); Hadar Yosef, Israel
- Occupations: Actor; voice actor
- Years active: 2002–present

Gilad Kleter (Hebrew: גלעד קלטר; born 2 April 1976) is an Israeli actor and voice actor.

== Biography ==
Kleter was raised in Hadar Yosef in Tel Aviv. At a young age, he was recruited for Tel-Aviv Scouts Band, where he was praised for his acting skills.

Kleter served as an actor and theatre commander at the Air Force Theater.

Since 1998, Kleter is a member of Gesher Theater, and played at many plays.

He is best known for his Hebrew-dubbing roles as Squidward Tentacles in SpongeBob SquarePants (the youngest actor to date to voice the character), Optimus Prime in The Transformers series, Dr. Heinz Doofenshmirtz in Phineas and Ferb, and Kowalski in the Madagascar series.

== Filmography ==
=== Dubbing ===
==== Animation and live-action television ====
- The Amazing World of Gumball (Larry Needlemeyer)
- Adventure Time (Billy, Keyper)
- American Dragon: Jake Long (Jonathan Long, Additional Characters)
- Animal Mechanicals (Sasquatch)
- The Avengers: Earth's Mightiest Heroes (Captain America, J.A.R.V.I.S.)
- Avengers Assemble (Captain America, Red Skull, Impossible Man, Mojo, J. Jonah Jameson, Additional Characters)
- B-Daman Crossfire (Accel=Dracyan)
  - B-Daman Fireblast (Rising=Dracyan)
- Back at the Barnyard (Pig)
- Bakugan Series
  - Bakugan: Battle Brawlers (Preyas, Shinjiro Kuso)
  - Bakugan: New Vestroia (Preyas, Shinjiro Kuso, Professor Clay Fermin)
  - Bakugan: Gundalian Invaders (Airzel)
  - Bakugan: Mechtanium Surge (Preyas, Wolfurio, Marucho's Father, Skytruss, Dragonoid Destroyer, Mandibor)
- Batman Series
  - The Batman (Joker)
  - Batman: The Brave and the Bold (Plastic Man, Red Tornado, Additional Characters)
- Ben 10: Alien Force (Azmuth, Carl Tennyson, Lodestar (Episode 31), Dr. Animo)
  - Ben 10: Ultimate Alien (Azmuth, Carl Tennyson, Lodestar, Dr. Animo (Season 1 Only), Additional Characters)
- Ben and Holly's Little Kingdom (King Thistle)
- Betsy's Kindergarten Adventures (Bus Driver Bob)
- Bolts & Blip (Hellsing 5)
- Bratz (Additional Characters)
- Busytown Mysteries (Lowly Worm)
- Bubble Guppies (additional characters) (season 3)
- Cardcaptor Sakura (Fujitaka Kinomoto)
- Cars Toons: Mater's Tall Tales (Additional Characters)
- CJ the DJ (Gene)
- Cosmic Quantum Ray (Quantum Ray)
- Digimon Series
  - Digimon Frontier (Mercurymon, Additional Characters)
  - Digimon Fusion (Dorulumon, AxeKnightmon, Additional Characters)
  - Digimon Tamers (Cyberdramon, Makuramon, Vajramon, Additional Characters)
- Dinosaur Train (Mr. Conductor)
- Dora the Explorer (Swiper the Fox, Additional Characters)
- Dragon Ball Z (Garlic Jr., King Vegeta (Episode 124), Babidi, West Kaio (2nd Voice))
- Fanboy & Chum Chum (Ozwald "Oz" Harmounian)
- Fish Hooks (Ninja Fish)
- Franklin (Mr. Turtle (2nd Voice))
- Geronimo Stilton (Additional Characters)
- Gofrette (Additional Characters)
- Gormiti (Additional Characters)
- Hot Wheels Battle Force 5 (Lord Zemerik (Episode 2 Onwards), Captain Kalus (Episode 1, Few Lines), Krytus)
- Huntik: Secrets & Seekers (Additional Characters)
- Jacob Two-Two (Additional Characters)
- Johnny Test (Hugh Test, Mr. White, Additional Characters)
- Jibber Jabber (Additional Characters)
- Jimmy Two-Shoes (Samuel "Samy" Garvin)
- Jungle Junction (Crocker)
- Justice League (J'onn J'onzz / Martian Manhunter)
  - Justice League Unlimited (J'onn J'onzz / Martian Manhunter)
- Justin Time (Justin's Dad, Additional Characters)
- Kenny the Shark (Peter Cassidy)
- Kick Buttowski: Suburban Daredevil (Harold "Harry" Buttowski, Mr. Vickle)
- Kid Paddle (Additional Characters)
- Kid vs. Kat (Burt Burtonburger)
- League of Super Evil (Reginald (Red) Menace)
- Legion of Super Heroes (Additional Characters)
- Hero Factory (Preston Stormer)
- Holly Hobbie & Friends (Additional Characters)
- Lego Marvel Super Heroes: Maximum Overload (Captain America, J. Jonah Jameson, Venom, Red Skull)
- Lilo & Stitch: The Series (Pleakley, Additional Characters)
  - Stitch! (Pleakley)
- Little Bill (Additional Characters)
- Little Nicolas/Sidekick: Revenge United (Cameron)
- The Looney Tunes Show (Porky Pig)
- Martin Morning (Additional Characters)
- Matt's Monsters (Bruce)
- Me and My Monsters (Nick Carlson)
- Me, Eloise (Additional Characters)
- Medabots (Squidguts (Season 2), Eddy)
- MegaMan NT Warrior (Mr. Famous, Yuichiro Hikari, Count Zapp, Additional Characters)
- Mermaid Melody Pichi Pichi Pitch (Taro Mitsuki)
  - Mermaid Melody Pichi Pichi Pitch Pure (Taro Mitsuki, Napoleon)
- Monster Allergy (Timothy-Moth)
- Ōban Star-Racers (Additional Characters)
- One Piece (Usopp, Additional Characters)
- Oobi (Oobi)
- PAW Patrol (Cap'n Turbot)
- Penn Zero: Part-Time Hero (Brock Zero)
- Phineas and Ferb (Dr. Heinz Doofenshmirtz, Carl the Intern, Roger Doofenshmirtz, Additional Characters)
  - Take Two with Phineas and Ferb (Dr. Heinz Doofenshmirtz, Additional Guests)
- Pinky Dinky Doo (Pinky's Father)
- Pokémon Series
  - Pokémon: Master Quest (Additional Characters)
  - Pokémon Chronicles (Additional Characters)
  - Pokémon: Diamond and Pearl: Battle Dimension (Additional Characters)
  - Pokémon: Diamond and Pearl: Galactic Battles (Charon, Additional Characters)
- Rechov Sumsum (Additional Characters)
  - Sesame Beginnings (Baby Big Bird)
- Rescue Heroes (Jake Justice)
- Ruby Gloom (Additional Characters)
- Rugrats Pre-School Daze (Additional Characters)
- Sandra the Fairytale Detective (Additional Characters)
- Scooby-Doo! Mystery Incorporated (Additional Characters)
- Sgt. Frog (Kululu, Paul Moriyama, Additional Characters)
- Shaman King (Amidamaru)
- Shaolin Wuzang (Sanzang)
- Skunk Fu! (Tiger)
- Sonic X (Vector the Crocodile, Sam Speed)
- Spider-Man Series
  - The Spectacular Spider-Man (Norman Osborn, Chameleon, Kraven the Hunter)
  - Ultimate Spider-Man (J. Jonah Jameson, Captain America, Grandmaster)
- Spike Team (Philip "Phil" Berger)
- SpongeBob SquarePants (Squidward Tentacles, Squilliam Fancyson, Additional Characters)
- Sitting Ducks (Ed)
- Tak and the Power of Juju (The Chief)
- Teenage Mutant Ninja Turtles (2003 TV series) (Raphael, Usagi Yojimbo)
- Teenage Mutant Ninja Turtles (2012 TV series) (Raphael)
- The Amazing Spiez! (Jerry)
- The Emperor's New School (Additional Characters)
- The Legend of Tarzan (Additional Characters)
- The Mr. Men Show (Mr. Scatterbrain)
- The New Adventures of Lucky Luke (Lucky Luke, William Dalton, Additional Characters)
  - The Daltons (Averrell Dalton)
- The Penguins of Madagascar (Kowalski, Additional Characters)
- The Powerpuff Girls (Snake, Additional Voices)
- The Raccoons (Schaeffer)
- The Replacements (Shelton Gunnar Klutzberry)
- The Super Hero Squad Show (Captain America)
- Tinga Tinga Tales (Peacock, Frog)
- Tokyo Mew Mew (Pai (2nd Voice))
- Tommy Zoom (Daniel)
- Totally Spies! (Additional Characters)
- Transformers Series (Optimus Prime)
  - The Transformers
  - Transformers: Robots in Disguise (Omega Prime, Rail Racer)
  - Transformers: Armada
  - Transformers: Cybertron
  - Transformers Animated
  - Transformers: Prime
- Turbo Dogs (Stinkbert)
- Viewtiful Joe (Aquatic Terror Gran Bruce)
- What's New, Scooby-Doo? (Additional Voices)
- WordGirl (Dr. Two-Brains, Mr. Big)
- Yin Yang Yo! (Master Yo)
- YooHoo & Friends (Pookee)

==== Animated and Live Action Films/Direct-To-Video Films ====
- Alice in Wonderland (Knave of Hearts' Horse)
- Animals United (Billy the Meerkat)
- Arthur and the Invisibles (Additional Voices)
  - Arthur 3: The War of the Two Worlds (Dad (Robert Stanton))
- Arthur Christmas (Additional Voices)
- Astro Boy (Sparx)
- Barnyard (Freddy)
- The Batman vs. Dracula (The Joker)
- Barbie in A Mermaid Tale 2 (Alistair)
- Bee Movie (Mr. Gamil)
- Ben 10: Destroy All Aliens (Azmuth, Carl Tennyson)
- Ben 10/Generator Rex: Heroes United (Lodestar)
- Beverly Hills Chihuahua (Additional Voices)
- Bolt (The Agent)
- Bridge to Terabithia (Bill Burke (Latham Gaines))
- Camp Rock 2: The Final Jam (Brown Cesario (Daniel Fathers))
- Cardcaptor Sakura Movie 2: The Sealed Card (Fujitaka Kinomoto)
- Cars (Additional Voice)
- Cars 2 (Tomber)
- Cats & Dogs: The Revenge of Kitty Galore (Diggs)
- Charlie and the Chocolate Factory (Additional Voices)
- Chicken Little (Turkey Lurkey)
- Coraline (Charlie Jones)
- Disney Princess Enchanted Tales: Follow Your Dreams (The Sultan)
- Dragon Ball Movies
  - Dragon Ball: Mystical Adventure (Tenshinhan, Emperor Pilaf)
  - Dragon Ball Z: The World's Strongest (Dr. Wheelo)
  - Dragon Ball Z: Bojack Unbound (Tenshinhan, Producer)
  - Dragon Ball: The Path to Power (General White)
- Dragon Hunters (Gildas)
- Ella Enchanted (Slannen (Aidan McArdle))
- Everyone's Hero (Lonnie Brewster)
- Flushed Away (Spike)
- Fly Me to the Moon (Leonide)
- Garfield: The Movie (Wendall (Evan Arnold))
- Garfield: A Tail of Two Kitties (Prince)
- Garfield's Pet Force (Jon Arbuckle)
- Gnomeo & Juliet (Paris)
- Happy Feet (Additional Voices)
- Harry Potter and the Prisoner of Azkaban (Peter Pettigrew (Timothy Spall))
- Harry Potter and the Goblet of Fire (Peter Pettigrew (Timothy Spall))
- Hoodwinked Too! Hood vs. Evil (Hansel)
- Horrid Henry: The Movie (Ed Banger (Noel Fielding), Additional Voices)
- Howl's Moving Castle (Additional Voices)
- Igor (Brain)
- Kangaroo Jack: G'Day U.S.A.! (Additional Voices)
- Kung Fu Panda (Additional Voices)
  - Kung Fu Panda 2 (Additional Voices)
- Lassie (Additional Voices)
- Lilly the Witch: The Dragon and the Magic Book (Mops)
- Looney Tunes: Back in Action (Filming Assistant)
- Madagascar (Kowalski)
- Madagascar: Escape 2 Africa (Kowalski)
- Madagascar 3: Europe's Most Wanted (Kowalski)
- Megamind (Citizen)
- Moana (Additional Voices)
- Monsters vs. Aliens (President Hathaway)
- Niko & The Way to the Stars (Specs)
- Nim's Island (Additional Voices)
- Over the Hedge (Tiger)
- Phineas and Ferb the Movie: Across the 2nd Dimension (Dr. Heinz Doofenshmirtz/Doofenshmirtz-2, Carl)
- Planet 51 (Additional Voices)
- Pokémon: Mewtwo Returns (Cullen Calix)
- Racing Stripes (Reggie)
- Ratatouille (Ambrister Minion)
- Robots (Additional Voices)
- Sammy's Adventures: The Secret Passage (Additional Voices)
- Scary Godmother: Halloween Spooktacular (Skully)
- Scooby-Doo 2: Monsters Unleashed (Dr. Jonathan Jacobo (Tim Blake Nelson))
- Shark Tale (Mobster Shark)
- Shrek Series (Little Pig)
  - Shrek 2 (Additional Voices)
  - Shrek the Third
  - Shrek the Halls
  - Shrek Forever After (Melty Witch)
- Son of the Mask (Additional Voices)
- Space Buddies (Sputnik)
- Space Chimps 2: Zartog Strikes Back (Titan)
- Speed Racer (Sparky (Kick Gurry))
- Spy Kids: All the Time in the World (Argonaut)
- Stuart Little 3: Call of the Wild (Monty)
- Surf's Up (Sal)
- Tangled (Additional Voices)
- The Cat in the Hat (Mr. Hank Humberfloob Sean Hayes)
- The Chronicles of Narnia: The Voyage of the Dawn Treader (Reepicheep)
- The Gruffalo (Snake)
  - The Gruffalo's Child (Snake)
- The Land Before Time II: The Great Valley Adventure (Ozzy)
- The Legend of Secret Pass (Loo)
- The Powerpuff Girls Movie (Snake)
- The Real Shlemiel (Lekish, Tudras)
- The Smurfs (Additional Voices)
- The SpongeBob SquarePants Movie (Squidward Tentacles)
  - The SpongeBob Movie: Sponge Out of Water (Squidward Tentacles)
- The Suite Life Movie (Dr. Donald Spaulding (John Ducey))
- The Three Musketeers (Additional Voices)
- The Transformers: The Movie (Optimus Prime)
- The Ugly Duckling and Me! (William)
- Tinker Bell and the Lost Treasure (Little Troll, Stone)
- TMNT (Thief)
- Tom and Jerry film Series
  - Tom and Jerry: Blast Off to Mars (Gardner, Worker, Martian General, Additional Voices)
  - Tom and Jerry: The Fast and the Furry (Commercial Announcer, Director)
  - Tom and Jerry: A Nutcracker Tale (Lacky, Mr. Malevolent, Additional Voices)
- Tony Hawk in Boom Boom Sabotage (DJ, Larry Grimley)
- Valiant (Lofty Thaddeus Worthington)
- Winnie the Pooh (The Backson)
- Wreck-It Ralph (Duncan)
- Yona Yona Penguin (Additional Voices)
- Zookeeper (Bruce the Grizzly Bear)

=== Acting ===
==== TV shows ====
- HaPijamot (Announcer)
- Spyders (Emanuel Goodman)
- Ulai Ha'Paam (Dr. Shalev)
