= Ha-Yeladim Mi'Givat Napoleon =

- Genre: Drama
- Starring: Yon Tumarkin
- Country of origin: Israel
- Original language: Hebrew
- No. of seasons: 3
- No. of episodes: 33

Original release
- Network: Arutz HaYeladim, BIGI, FOMO
- Release: 2001 – 2004

Ha-Yeladim Mi'Givat Napoleon (Hebrew: הילדים מגבעת נפוליאון, The Kids of Napoleon Hill) was an Israeli television drama created by Gidi Dar, Gur Bentwich and Shlomo Mashiah. The three seasons of the series were broadcast between 2001 and 2004.

The series is about children from Tel Napoleon in Ramat Gan who spend their summer discovering mysteries.

The first two seasons won the Israeli Television Academy Award for Best Children's Series (in 2003 and 2004).

== Cast ==
- Yon Tumarkin as Ido Klein
- Dror Ziv as Tomer
- Raz Plato as Yuval Levin
- Alex Lin as Gil
- Ana Sgan-Cohen as Ella
- Dana Bublil as Dana
- Haran Sagi as Avi Klein
- Gilya Stern as Dafna Klein
- Mati Seri as Michael Levin
- Tzahi Grad as Superintendent Sussmann
- Limor Prag as Tzameret Karni
