= Maya Shoef =

Israeli actress

Maya Shoef peled
- מאיה שואף פלד
- Born: January 2, 1988 (age 38); Tel Aviv, Israel
- Occupation: Actress

Maya Shoef Peled (Hebrew: מאיה שואף; born 1 May 1988) is an Israeli actress and is most famous for her roles as a protagonist of the Israeli television series Split and Alex: Pros and Cons.

== Biography ==
Maya Shoef was born at 1 May 1988 in Tel Aviv, Israel. She has one brother. When she was a child she wanted to become a veterinarian. Later, she wanted to be an actress. In her youth she was a member of the Tel Aviv Scouts Band.

In 2008, Shoef appeared in the Israeli version of the High School Musical. In 2009, she played a recurring character in the third season of the Israeli soap opera Champion. In the same year she got the lead role in the Israeli television series Alex Pros and Cons (Hebrew:אלכס בעד ונגד). She played the girl Alex who has to write a newspaper article and falls in love with Jordan, a foreign worker from the library.

After this she was cast for one of the main roles in the supernatural drama Split. She played Zohar Grin a student and daughter of the principal for four years.

Then she went to New York to study acting. In 2013 she graduated from the Stella Adler Studio of Acting. She got back to Israel in 2014 and played a role in the television series Dead for a second.

In addition to being an actress, Shoef is also a singer. She was one of the hosts of the Israeli Festigal in 2010.

== Filmography ==
=== Film ===
Year	Title	Role	Notes
2014	The Sirens	Annabel	Short

=== Television ===
Year	Title	Role	Notes
2009	Alex Pros and Cons	Alex	Lead role
2009	Champion	Dfy	
2009–2012	Split	Zohar Green	TV series, 132 episodes, main role
2012–2013	Galis	Rotem Tishler	
2014	Dead for a second	Mickey	
2017	As Davar	Yael	
