= Yedidia Vital =

Israeli actor (born 1984)

- ידידיה ויטל
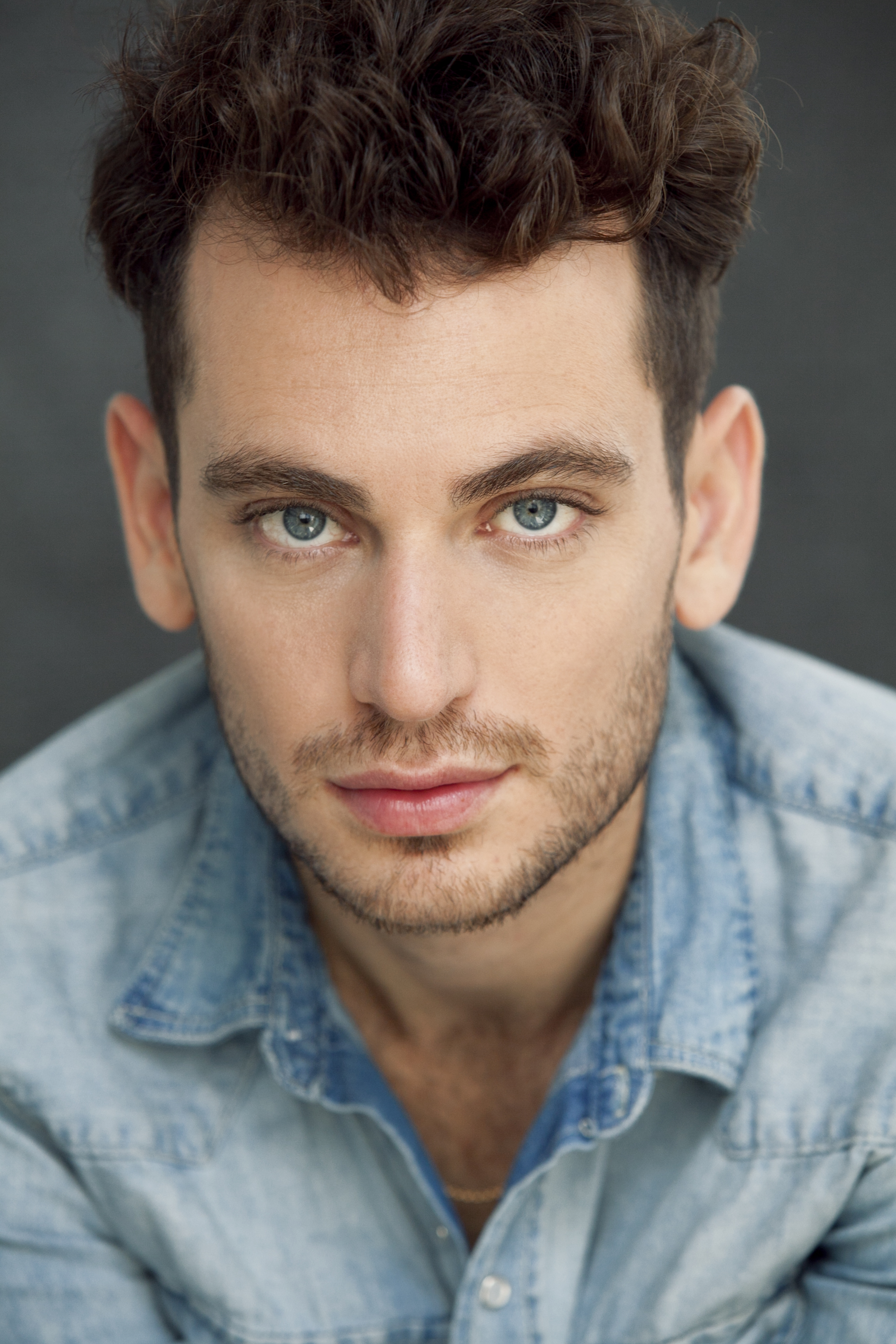
- Yedidia Vital in 2008
- Born: October 2, 1984 (age 41); Jerusalem, Israel
- Occupation: Actor
- Years active: 2001-present
- Children: 2

Yedidia Vital (Hebrew: ידידיה ויטל; born 2 October 1984) is an Israeli actor. Known for portraying the protagonist of the Israeli television series Split and HaShminiya.

== Biography ==
Yedidia Vital was born on 2 October 1984 at a hospital in Ramallah, to Jewish-Israeli parents. He grew up in Pardes Hanna-Karkur, Israel. However he moved to Tel Aviv to become an actor. At first he has lived off of temporary work to pay the rent. Then attended the Nissan Nativ Acting Studio in Tel Aviv, where he was trained as an actor. From 2009 to 2012 he played one of the main character in the Israeli television series Split. Since 2005 he plays the lead role in HaShminiya (השמיניה). Next to television series and films Yedidia has also appeared in several theatre plays. In 2012 he played a main role in the theatre play World Cup Wishes (משאלה אחת ימינה). In 2013 he took part in the one man play I never (אף פעם לא). In 2014 he could be seen in the theatre play Tribes (שבטים).

== Filmography ==
=== Film ===
Year	Title	Role	Notes
2001	Lemon Popsicle 9: The Party Goes On	Meir Kuperm	
2004	Draft (Short)	Guy Genar	
2006	Simanei Derech	Gili	Short
2009	Adom Adom	Gur	Short
2009	Daswarilli		Short
2009	Mary Lou	Ori	
2011	A Moment of Youth		
2011	Resisei Ahava	Shlomo	
2012	Krav Enayim		Short
2012	Water		
2013	Let Me Help You		Short

=== Television ===
Year	Title	Role	Notes
2005–2013	HaShminiya	Nini Dvir	
2006	Ha-Pijamot	Din	1 episode
2007-2008	Ha-E	Book	
2008	Loving Anna	Yoav	3 episodes
2008	Tamid oto chalom	Ori	1 episode
2009-2012	Split	Omer Teneh	135 episodes
2015	Polishuk		

== Personal life ==
In 2018 Vital married Erez Brenholtz, who was his boyfriend for 11 years. They are raising two children.
