= Din Din Aviv =

Israeli pop and folk singer

Din Din Aviv דין דין אביב
- Birth name: Dina Aviv
- Born: 9 October 1974 (age 50)
- Origin: Tel Aviv, Israel
- Genres: World; pop
- Occupations: Singer; musician
- Instrument: Percussionist
- Years active: 1998–present
- Labels: Hed Arzi/Labeleh
- Website: dindinaviv.com

Din Din Aviv (Hebrew: דין דין אביב; born 9 October 1974 as Dina Aviv) is an Israeli pop and folk singer. After performing with Gaya and with the Idan Raichel Project, she released her debut album, Sodotay (My Secrets) in 2006.

== Biography ==
Dina (Din Din) Aviv was born in Tel Aviv, Israel. Her parents are both artists; her mother, Aliza Aviv, is a performing singer in a wide range of styles, her father was a jazz musician, and as a child she recorded an album, Alidin with her mother and accompanied her father when he performed.

Aviv is a graduate of Alliance High School and was a member of the Tel Aviv Scouts Band as part of her being part of the Sea Scouts in Tel Aviv. She served in the Israeli army as a solo vocalist for the Air Force entertainment troupe. She studied dance and ballet at the Israel School of Ballet and with Dorit Gasner, African dance with Master Aisha Diallo, Indian song and Tabla drum playing in India, African drumming with Uri Nave, congas with master Avi Zarfati, and piano and two years of drum and voice studies at the Rimon School of Jazz and Contemporary Music.

She gave "Rhythm in Dance" workshops at Seminar Hakibbutzim and her ular children's video, Tof HaLev Shel Din Din (Hebrew: תוף הלב של דין דין, "Din Din's Heart Drum"), introduced many Israeli families to the world of rhythm. She presented a world music program with her mother, Aliza Aviv, in which they both sing in Turkish, Kurdish, Greek, Bulgarian, Georgian, Persian and Hebrew. She was a chosen artist of the Israel Cultural Excellence Foundation (IcExcellence), which aims to support artistic talent in Israel.

== Music career ==
As an adult, Aviv joined Gaya, a leading Israeli band, who had a hit song, Shir La'Ahava (Yachad), which received the Discovery of the Year Award and has become an unofficial second national anthem for many Israelis. She then joined the Idan Raichel Project, and was the lead singer on the hit song Im Telech (If You Leave).

After performing with Gaya and the Idan Raichel Project, she released a solo album, Sodotay (My Secrets) in spring 2006, for which she received the "Discovery of the Year" award from ACUM (The Composers, Authors and Publishers Society of Israel) and a Gold Album award in April 2007. The three songs from the album released as singles (Familiar To Me From Once, Dreaming (ft. Mush Ben Ari) and Sodotay (My Secrets)) all reached the top three of the charts. The single, Sodotay (My Secrets), was nominated for Song of the Year at the annual Israeli Music Channel Awards in March 2007. Aviv received the Best Artist in Music award from the Israel Ministry of Culture, the nation's highest cultural award, in 2007, and embarked on her first US tour in March 2008, performing in Tulsa, New York City, Sarasota, Fort Lauderdale and Boca Raton. Her second album, Hofshia Ben Olamot (Free between Worlds), was released in 2008.

== See also ==
- Music in Israel
