= Avi Kornick =

Israeli actor (born 1983)

- אבי קורניק
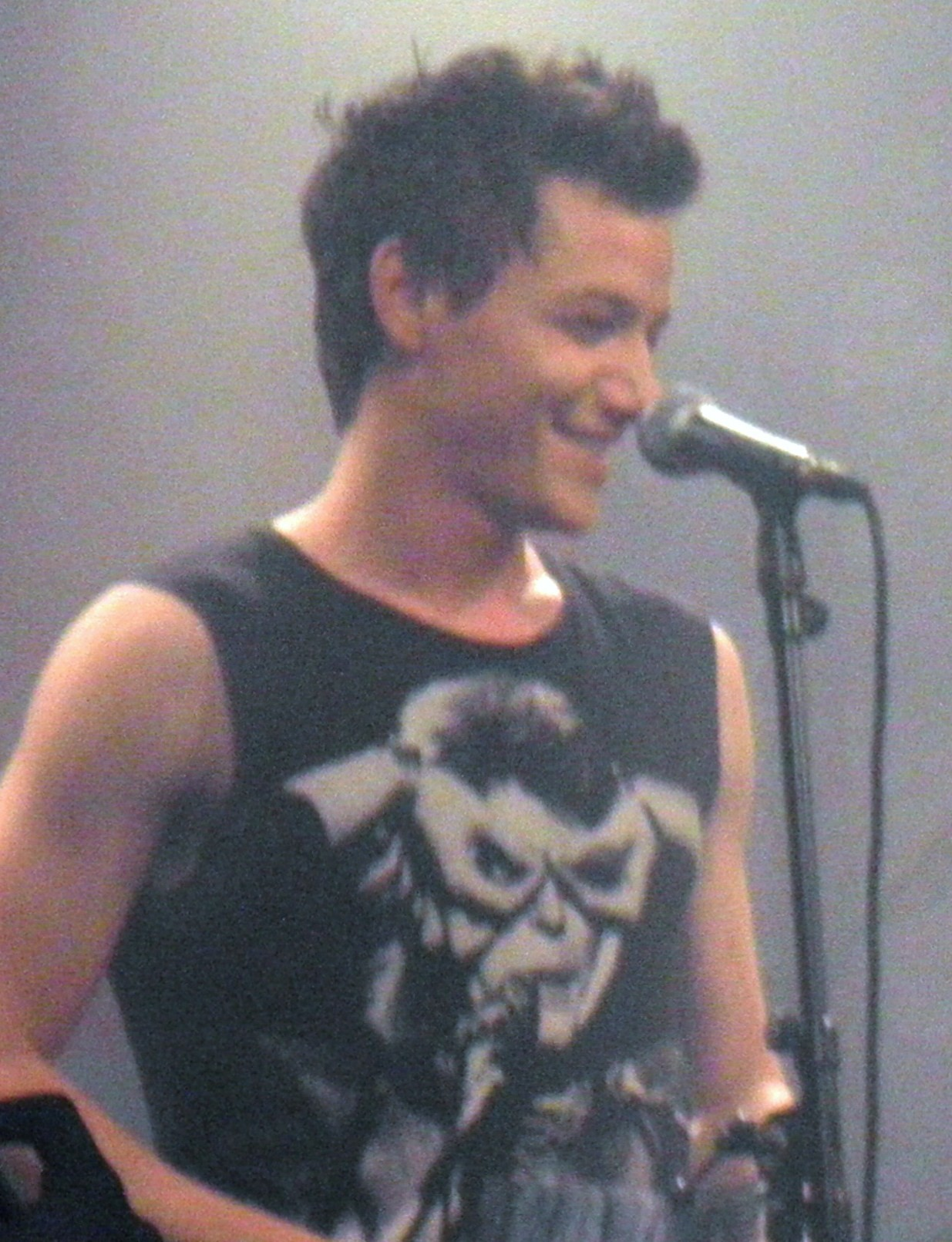
- Avi Kornick during a concert in 2010
- Born: Avraham Kornick; May 2, 1983 (age 41); Tel Aviv, Israel
- Occupation: Actor

Avraham "Avi" Kornick (Hebrew: אברהם "אבי" קורניק; born 2 May 1983) is an Israeli actor and is famous as a protagonist of the Israeli television series Split and HaShminiya.

== Biography ==
Kornick grew up in Ramat Aviv, a prestigious neighborhood in Tel Aviv, Israel, where he lived together with his Jewish parents. He attended Alliance High School in Tel Aviv. He began acting at the age of 14 and appeared in several TV advertisements. At 18 he planned to study at the New York University, however his mother suffered from cancer, so he stayed in Israel. She died when Kornick was 19 years old. After working for the army he took part in several theatre plays. One of these theatre plays was Black Box, which is based on the book by Amos Oz. Since 2005 he is playing the main character Avi Moskovich in HaShminiya who is a computer specialist. From 2009 to 2012 he played one of the main character in the Israeli television series Split.

== Filmography ==
=== Film ===
Year	Title	Role	Notes
2008	Maftir	Young Boy	
2010	Anna and the King of Siam	Chola Lunga	
2016	Beauty and the Beast		
2017	The sins	Dodosh	

=== Television ===
Year	Title	Role	Notes
2003	Battle on the way to Jerusalem	Yashka	TV series
2007	Franco and Spector	A young boy	TV series
2005–2007	HaShminiya	Avi Moskovich	TV series, 198 episodes, main role
2007	Maybe this time	Danny Sheinb	TV series
2007-2008	The Place	Ben	TV series
2008	Dolls	Sagi Donovit	TV series
2009–2012	Split	Guy Rozen	TV series, 132 episodes, main role
2013–present	Eight - The Next Generation	Avi Moskovich	TV series
2015	Sabena	Benjamin Netany	TV movie
