= Tomer Sharon =

Israeli actor (born 1970)

- תומר שרון
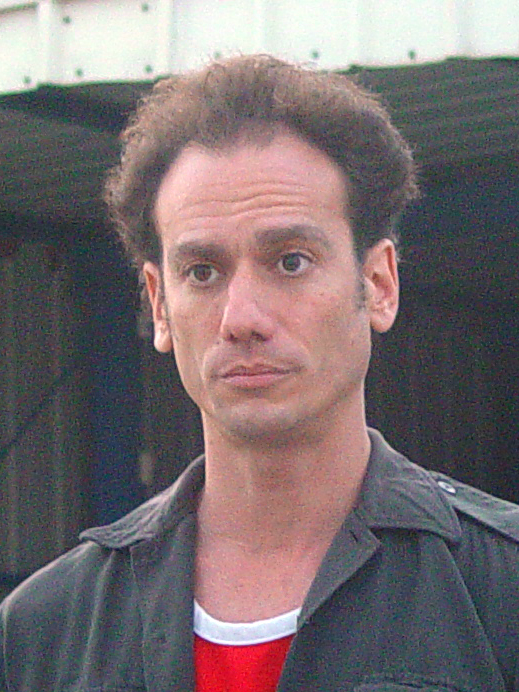
- Sharon in 2008
- Born: 14 May 1970 (age 55); Tel Aviv, Israel
- Occupations: Actor; voice artist; comedian; singer; television personality
- Years active: 1980–present

Tomer Sharon (Hebrew: תומר שרון; born 14 May 1970) is an Israeli actor, voice actor, comedian and singer.

== Biography ==
Born in Tel Aviv, Sharon began his acting career at the age of 10 in a television series directed by Shaike Ophir. During his teen years, he was a member of the Hebrew Scouts Movement in Israel, including being a member of the Tel Aviv Scouts Band and he also took part in a 1988 military band, which was disbanded because some of the members were found in possession of hashish and cannabis. During the 1990s, Sharon portrayed Yaron Segal in the teen drama series A Matter of Time. He later reprised the role in a 2012 spin-off. Sharon also appeared in several satire sketches directed by Avi Cohen. On film, Sharon appeared in the 2001 film Clean Sweep starring Alon Abutbul. This was by far, his most prominent film appearance.

On stage, Sharon has worked at numerous theatres which includes the Beit Lessin Theatre, the Habima Theatre, the Cameri Theatre and many more. He has performed in stage adaptations of A Midsummer Night's Dream and The Grapes of Wrath. In 1993, he was one of the few participants of the Acco Festival of Alternative Israeli Theatre.

Sharon has had success as a Hebrew voice dubbing pioneer. He has dubbed Timon in The Lion King franchise, Mushu in the Mulan franchise, Nico in Rio and Rio 2 as well as Porky Pig and Sylvester in Space Jam and Looney Tunes: Back in Action. Other popular character dubbing roles include Mike Wazowski in Monsters, Inc., Flik in A Bug's Life, Dinky in The Fox and the Hound, The Willie Brothers in Home on the Range, Mr. Wiener in the Open Season film series and many more.

Sharon took part in Double Tomer alongside Tomer Yosef and since 2005, he took part in an improvisation show. Around the same time, he was a member of a contemporary Israeli quartet and in 2016, he performed at the Abu Ghosh Vocal Music Festival.

=== Personal life ===
In 2013, Sharon stated that he prefers to abstain from romantic relationships but is open to having children. He has also suffered from depression.

On June 22, 2012, Sharon was arrested on Rothschild Boulevard during the social justice protests.
