= Amit Farkash =

Canadian-born Israeli actress and singer

- עמית פרקש
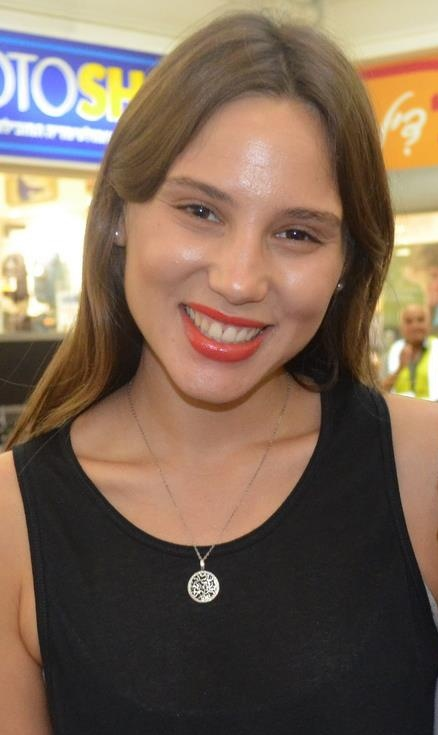
- Farkash in 2013
- Born: Melissa Amit Farkash; May 26, 1989 (age 36); Toronto, Ontario, Canada
- Occupations: Actress, singer
- Spouse: Yair Yonas (m. 2019)
- Children: 2

Amit Farkas-Yonas (Note: Farkas is a Hungarian surname, pronounced as "Farkash") (Hebrew: עמית פרקש-יונס; born May 26, 1989) is a Canadian-born Israeli actress and singer. She is best known as the protagonist of the Israeli television series Split.

== Biography ==
Melissa Amit Farkas was born in Toronto, Ontario, Canada, to an Ashkenazi Israeli Jewish family. At the age of two years, her family moved with her to Israel, and resided in the cities of Ramat HaSharon and Caesarea. At thirteen, she began to study singing. She became known in 2006 when she recorded the song Millions of Stars in memory of her brother, Captain Tom Farkash, who died in a helicopter crash during the Second Lebanon War in 2006 while serving in the Israel Defense Forces. On hearing of his death, Amit asked a friend of Tom to write the song, which she sang for the first time publicly at his funeral. It gained fame on radio and became the song most closely identified with the war.

In the IDF, she served in the Israeli Air Force Band.

From 2007 to 2008 Farkash played a lead role in the Israeli version of High School Musical. She also performed at the Hanukkah Festigal in 2009 and 2011. In 2010 she released the single Something New.

In 2009 Farkash got her first big lead role in TV, starring as Ella Rosen in the Israeli fantasy drama series Split. The series was a huge international success and aired in a total of 78 different countries. In 2012 Farkash was a contestant in season seven of the Israeli series Dancing With the Stars. She was partnered with professional dancer Oron Dahan and won the third place. Since 2014 Farkash has only appeared in a few television roles, refocusing her career on musical theatre. In recent years has starred in Israeli adaptations of musicals including Spring Awakening and as Maria in The Sound of Music. In 2015 she released another single entitled Leyadcha.

In September 2019, Farkash married her partner Yair Yonas.

== Filmography ==
=== Film ===
| Year | Title | Role | Notes |
|---|---|---|---|
| 2013 | Plaited Braid | | |
| 2017 | Almost Famous (Kimaat Mefursemet) | Mya | |
| 2017 | Shopkeepers Club: Missing (Mo'adon ha'khnounim: ha'seret) | Dana | |
| 2017 | Journey of the Ring | Raffaella | |
| 2023 | Victory | Yael Harlap | |

=== Television ===
| Year | Title | Role | Notes |
|---|---|---|---|
| 2009 | Alex pro and cons | Aya | Main role |
| 2009–2012 | Split | Ella Rosen | TV series, 135 episodes, lead role |
| 2012 | Dancing with Stars (Rokdim Im Kochavim) | Herself | Reality performance competition TV series, season 7 |
| 2014 | The Nerd Club | Dana | main role |

== Discography ==
- 2006: מיליון כוכבים (A Million Stars, single)
- 2010: Something New (single)
- 2015: Leyadcha (single)
