= List of Naor's Friends episodes =

The following is an episode list for the Israeli sitcom Naor's Friends.

== Series overview ==
Season	Episodes	Originally released	
Season	Episodes	First released	Last released
1	13	November 14, 2006	February 7, 2007
2	10	February 28, 2009	May 5, 2009
3	18	April 5, 2011	August 16, 2011
4	13	February 23, 2017	June 22, 2017

== Episodes ==
=== Season 1 (2006) ===
No.	#	Title	Original Airdate
1	1	"The Annoying Male Friend Vanisher" (מעלים ידידים)	November 14, 2006
Weisman has a new girlfriend. To Weisman's misfortune, his girlfriend has two annoying male friends whom Weisman is not keen on. Dalal advises him to use the services of the "Annoying Male Friend Vanisher".
2	2	"Pick Up Bar" (פיק אפ בר)	November 21, 2006
Dedi desires to retire from his job as a military pilot. His commanders, who do not want him to leave, attempt to get him to stay by using the a pretty woman to convince him to stay in the army. In addition, Naor's young nephew asks for Naor's help against a kindergarten bully.
3	3	"SMS" (אס אמ אס)	November 28, 2006
Naor's girlfriend breaks up with Naor claiming that he doesn't type SMS text messages to her mobile phone fast enough. As a result, Naor goes to special classes that teach adults, like himself, how to type quickly SMS text messages.
4	4	"The Hummus Joint" (החומוסיה)	December 5, 2006
Naor and his friends, accustomed to eat in a particular hummus joint in Tel Aviv which is run by their friend, begin going to a different hummus joint which they believe has a more delicious hummus. Things get complicated when Naor falls in love with the daughter of the manager of the new hummus joint, who is an Israeli-Arab.
5	5	"The Wounded Woman" (הפצועה)	December 12, 2006
Naor, Weisman and Dedi fall in love with a beautiful wounded woman in the hospital. The three attempt to get her attention, but eventually discover that she was an undercover TV reporter.
6	6	"Die Laughing" (למות מצחוק)	December 19, 2006
A person who attended Naor's stand-up show couldn't stop laughing, and as a result he got a cardiac arrest and died. As a result, Naor, who could not stop feeling remorse for the tragic event, attempts to seek forgiveness from the deceased's wife, nevertheless, the widow refuses to forgive him and refers to Naor as a murderer.
7	7	"Dance of Swords" (מחול החרבות)	December 26, 2006
Naor decides to buy his young nephew a birthday present - but when he discovers a pair of Star Wars lightsabers he ends up buying them for himself. Naor's nephew accidentally finds the lightsabers and believes they were the gift Naor intended to give him.
8	8	"The Polish Date" (הפולניה)	January 2, 2007
Naor meets a new girlfriend who is of Polish origin. Naor's friends try to get him to understand he is making a big mistake and advise him to break up with the new girlfriend, fearing that she might make his life miserable, but he in turn refuses to listen to his friends, and eventually discovers for himself the mistake of actually going out with his new girlfriend when he gets to attend a dinner at her parents' house.
9	9	"Sand from Ko Phi Phi" (חול מקופיפי)	January 9, 2007
Weisman gets back from Ko Phi Phi and brings with him two jars filled with sand for Naor and Dedi. Mika is offended after she finds out Weisman brought her only a dress. To encourage her, Weisman lies and tells her that he also brought her a sand jar from Ko Phi Phi but forgot it in his car. As a result, Weisman attempts to make another sand jar for Mika. Weisman goes to deserted beach and fills an empty jar with sand, but soon afterwards Mossad agents interrogate him on the grounds that he is aware of a certain secret about that particular type of sand. Meanwhile, Naor travels to Switzerland without informing his mother about it.
10	10	"Zion JDate" (ציון ג'יי דייט)	January 16, 2007
Naor and his friends join an online dating service. Meanwhile, it is reported on the news that a serial killer, who meets his victims through dating websites, is on the loose.
11	11	"Return To The Sea" (שובי שובי לים)	January 23, 2007
Naor and his friends can't get a certain annoying Israeli song out of their heads. Dalal introduces them to someone who would be capable of helping them stop thinking of the annoying song.
12	12	"A New Friend" (חבר חדש)	January 30, 2007
Naor's friends are all busy (Weisman is in the reserves, Dedi is taking pilot training courses, and Mika is studying quantum physics). As a result, Naor decides to find a new friend. This raises the suspicion of Naor's mother who later tells Mika that she thinks Naor's friend is gay. Meanwhile, Weisman hits on the commander's girlfriend - a move which gets him in trouble.
13	13	"A Periphery Girlfriend" (חברה מהפריפריה)	February 6, 2007
Naor gets on a train to Jerusalem, following a girl he is in love with. He attempts to get her attention without success. Later on he meets her again, and they go on a trip together to Jerusalem. Meanwhile, Weisman is also dating a girl, who is actually an organizer of partner swapping gatherings, a fact which he initially was not aware of.

=== Season 2 (2009) ===
No.	#	Title	Original Airdate
14	1	"The Overcoming Separation Specialist" (מוציאה מקשר)	February 28, 2009
Dedi and his girlfriend break up. Dedi is devastated by the break up. The group decide to follow the advice of Omri and take Dedi to a special service which specializes in overcoming break ups. At the same time, Naor helps Dalal's nephew realize fulfill his dream - to meet the Israeli singer Shiri Maimon.
15	2	"The Return of the Bimbo" (שובה של הפרחה)	March 7, 2009
Naor has a new girlfriend. His friends are excited about her, but he argues that she is a bimbo and that she constantly attempts to hide it. With the help of Dalal, Naor eventually manages to prove that she is a bimbo.
16	3	"Which Astrological Sign Are You?" (איזה מזל אתה?)	March 14, 2009
Naor is interested in dating the Israeli TV personality Yael Goldman but Mika warns him that he has no chance because he is an Aquarius and she only dates Taurus. As a result, Naor decides to tell Goldman that he is a Taurus in order to date her.
17	4	"Waitress Or Hostess?" (מלצרית או מארחת?)	March 21, 2009
Dedi and Weisman make an experiment among themselves trying to figure out whom they would rather date - the waitresses or the hostesses. Soon afterwards, Naor and Mika join the experiment when Naor dates a Shef and Mika dates the restaurant owner.
18	5	"The Prosecution" (התביעה)	March 28, 2009
Naor is sued by a couple who attended his stand-up show and sat in the front row. They require him to pay a compensation of $500,000. Meanwhile, Wisseman and Mika get into debt, and Eliko, a local homeless person, showing them an easy way to get rich - by pretending to be homeless and begging at major city intersections.
19	6	"She Got People" (יש לה פיפל)	April 4, 2009
Naor gets his own prime time TV special on Channel 10, but in the condition that he would be able to get no less than 20% ratings. When everything seems lost, and Naor begins thinking of give up the opportunity, Naor manages to get a list of all the households which carry a Portable People Meter with the help of his friend Dedi.
20	7	"The Married Guy" (הנשוי)	April 18, 2009
The group get a surprise visit from an old friend who introduces them to new facts about marriage. Meanwhile, Mika becomes a children's author.
21	8	"The Shirt" (החולצה)	April 25, 2009
Naor returns to Israel from a vacation abroad with an extraordinary colorful Italian designer knitwear called "Missoni". Naor, who initially believes the expensive knitwear were definitely a great purchase, is slandered by the Israeli media, especially by a specific tough TV styling critic.
22-23	9-10	"Messing with the Mob (Two Parts)" (סכסכן במאפיה - פרק כפול)	May 5, 2009
A two episode special which is a gesture to the classic western "A Fistful of Dollars". The Tel Aviv police asks Naor to sow discord between two major Israeli criminal gangs.

=== Season 3 (2011) ===
No. overall	No. in season	Title	Directed by	Written by	Original release date
24	1	"The Moroccan Grandmother (סבתא מרוקאית)"	Naor Zion	Naor Zion	April 5, 2011
Naor is invited to dinner at his girlfriend's traditional Jewish Moroccan family and gets to meet her peculiar grandmother. Meanwhile, Dedi who is dating a new girlfriend, is trying to figure out how to deal with her bully little brother who dislikes Dedi.
25	2	"Passive Aggressive (פאסיב אגרסיב)"	Naor Zion	Naor Zion	April 12, 2011
Omri teaches the gang his best strategy to meet attractive girls in Tel Aviv which he calls "Passive aggressive". Naor attempts to use a similar strategy, while Dafi falls under the spell of Udi Katash (played by Ori Pfeffer) although she does not know he too is using the same strategy.
26	3	"The First Years of the Covert Bimbo (השנים הראשונות של הפרחה הסמויה)"	Naor Zion	Naor Zion	April 26, 2011
A new character is introduced named Shontal Suissa (played by Anat Magen) who is an ambitious bimbo from the periphery who desperately wants to thrive in Tel Aviv and intends to do so while hiding her natural primitive demeanor. The episode completely focuses on Suissa – from when she moved to the big city of Tel Aviv, how she successfully managed to get a job in the capital market and, at the end of the episode, how she got to meet Naor.
27	4	"Vipassanā (ויפסאנה)"	Naor Zion	Naor Zion	May 3, 2011
Dafi decides that the main problem she has with men relates to the fact that she cannot whistle. Her psychologist recommends her to take a Vipassanā workshop and the gang decide to join her. Matters escalate when Naor's Mother is thrown out of the Vipassanā workshop and when friends decide to rebel.
28	5	"Divorce Tel Aviv Style (גירושין נוסח תל אביב)"	Naor Zion	Naor Zion	May 10, 2011
Amit (played by Guy Loel) and Ayala (played by Michal Yanai), a married couple who are acquaintances of Naor and the gang, decide to divorce. Their divorce soon develops into an all-out war on their common property. Naor and the gang are swept into the war, when the gang have to take sides and as a result the group is split up.
29	6	"My Girlfriend is a Porn Star (חברה שלי כוכבת פורנו)"	Naor Zion	Naor Zion	May 17, 2011
Naor's friend Netzach Azoulay (played by Shlomi Koriat) who lives in the U.S. and works as a successful porn director arrives in Tel Aviv to shoot a trailer for a new porn film featuring the leading porn star Kelly da Costa. Dafi is dating Yovav, an amateur director who can not find funding for the feature film he wants to produce.
30	7	"Dalal's Daughter (הבת של דלאל)"	Naor Zion	Naor Zion	May 24, 2011
Inbal, Dalal's daughter (played by Moran Atias) returns to Israel after six years in Italy. The group's friend "Barvaz" (played by Ido Mosseri) finds a new place to pick up girls.
31	8	"The Girl From the Talkbacks (ההיא מהטוקבק)"	Naor Zion	Naor Zion	May 31, 2011
Naor discovers that a person whom goes under the username "Hedva Sinvani" is writing bad comments about him online. Naor suspects that his mother and as a result hires two eccentric specialists to bust on the "talkbackist" - a computer genius (played by Maor Cohen) and a Russian thug. In addition, Dedi and Wiseman attempt to get a date at a traveling agency.
32	9	"Vilo and the Laptopists (וילו והלפטופיסטים)"	Naor Zion	Naor Zion	June 7, 2011
The Israeli comedian Samuel Vilozny (played by himself) decides to open a coffeehouse in Tel-Aviv. The coffeehouse initially becomes quite profitable, nevertheless, things get complicated when a group of laptop users swarms to the new coffeehouse and decide to settle there. As a result, the frustrated Vilozny makes every effort to get them to leave. In addition, Dedi gets involved with a mysterious and sexy blogger.
33	10	"Impostor on Facebook: Part 1 (מתחזה בפייסבוק: חלק ראשון)"	Naor Zion	Naor Zion	June 21, 2011
The group finds out that an anonymous person is pretending to be the real Naor Zion on Facebook. After the group confronts the impostor in real life, they soon discover that the "New Naor" is a lot more fun than the true Naor Zion.
34	11	"Impostor on Facebook: Part 2 (מתחזה בפייסבוק: חלק שני)"	Naor Zion	Naor Zion	June 28, 2011
After agreeing to cooperate with the impostor Naor understand he has made a mistake. In order to get rid of Naor's imposter, the group needs to win a snooker tournament held against the impostor. To do so, the group recruit the stars of the Israeli cult film "Hagiga B'Snuker" (played by Yehuda Barkan and Ze'ev Revach).
35	12	"Love in South Tel Aviv (אהבה בדרום תל אביב)"	Naor Zion	Naor Zion	July 5, 2011
Each member of the group finds love in various parts of Tel-Aviv and Naor even believes he has met a potential bride. In addition, Dedi attempts to impress and pick up girls in Riverdance classes.
36	13	"Something to look forward to (משהו לצפות לו)"	Naor Zion	Naor Zion	July 12, 2011
The group discusses a philosophical question - when is someone really happy. In addition, Naor is directing a big budget commercial for McDonald's.
37–38	14–15	"Fight with Paparazzi (Two Parts) (להתאגרף עם פפראצי - פרק כפול)"	Naor Zion	Naor Zion	July 19, 2011
Naor starts dating Daria (played by Romi Abulafia) for whom he has strong feelings. Nevertheless, an aggressive paparazzi photographer named Zahi Buchris (played by Ido Pariente) ruins his chances continuing dating her. As a result, Naor challenges Buchris to a high-profile boxing match in which he hopes to humiliate him. Naor is coached for the match by a Russian coach named "Fima" (played by Moni Moshonov).
39	16	"The Hungarian Blintzes (הבלינצ'ס ההונגרי)"	Naor Zion	Naor Zion	July 26, 2011
40	17	"Horror Episode (פרק אימה)"	Naor Zion	Naor Zion	August 2, 2011
41	18	"Right Side Profile (פרופיל צד ימין)"	Naor Zion	Naor Zion	August 16, 2011

=== Season 4 (2017) ===
No. overall	No. in season	Title	Directed by	Written by	Original release date
42	1	"Bar Mitzvah (ברכה לבר מצווה)"	Naor Zion	Naor Zion	February 23, 2017
43	2	"With No Prior Information (בלי מידע מוקדם)"	Naor Zion	Naor Zion	March 2, 2017
44	3	"Lend Me Your Iguana (תלווה לי ת'איגואנה)"	Naor Zion	Naor Zion	March 9, 2017
45	4	"Dalal Bakery (דלאל בייקרי)"	Naor Zion	Naor Zion	March 16, 2017
46	5	"Fish Shop (מסריח, ולא מדגים)"	Naor Zion	Naor Zion	March 23, 2017
47	6	"The Jacket I Lost in the Mail (הז׳קט שאיבדתי בדואר)"	Naor Zion	Naor Zion	March 30, 2017
48	7	"I Know How You Think (אני יודע איך אתה חושב)"	Naor Zion	Naor Zion	May 11, 2017
49	8	"And It's Not Taken for Granted (וזה לא מובן מאליו)"	Naor Zion	Naor Zion	May 18, 2017
50	9	"The Girl With The New Glasses (הבחורה מאחורי זכוכית החדשות)"	Naor Zion	Naor Zion	May 25, 2017
51	10	"Beware, Vegetarians! (סכנה, צמחונים)"	Naor Zion	Naor Zion	June 1, 2017
52	11	"Manipulator, Inc. (מניפולטור בעמ)"	Naor Zion	Naor Zion	June 8, 2017
53	12	"Stock Market Crash (מפולת בבורסה)"	Naor Zion	Naor Zion	June 15, 2017
54	13	"The First Man on the Moon (הדדי הראשון בירח)"	Naor Zion	Naor Zion	June 22, 2017
