= Shay Kanot =

Israeli director

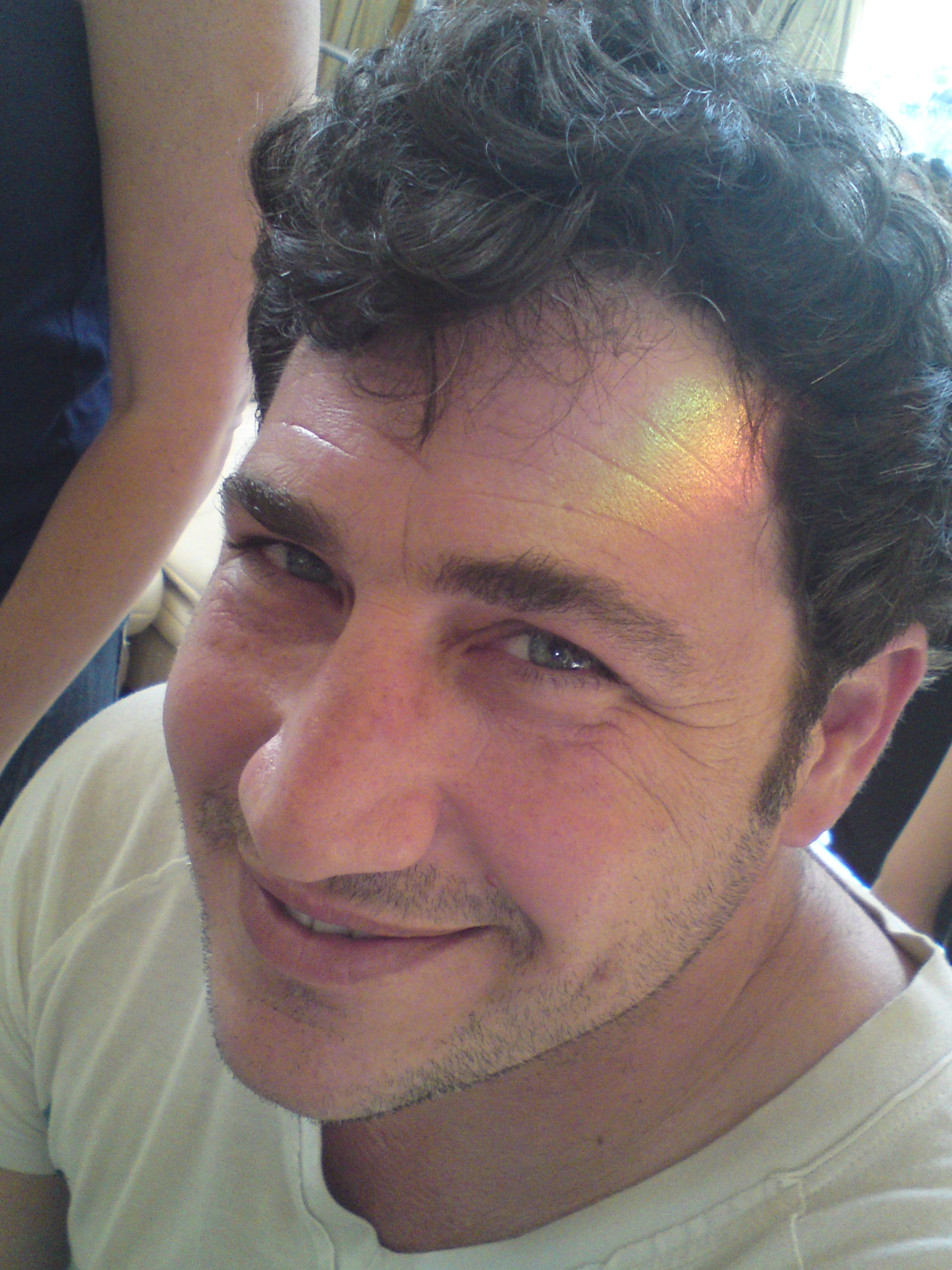
Shay Kanot

Shay Kanot (Hebrew: שי כנות) is an American film and television screenwriter and director.

He is known for his creating and directing the four season crime series The Arbitrator (Ha-borer) starring Yehuda Levi and Ania Bukstein. Shay Kanot also directed Gal Gadot in her only Israeli movie The Goal (Kicking out Shoshana) sold to Apple TV+ . The drama series Shay Kanot directed Pushers (Beni-or) was nominated for best-series in TV Series Festival Berlin. He directed the series Three (Thalathe) which was nominated for best-series TV at the Festival De Cannes.

== Career ==
Kanot works both in television and film. Among his most prominent and well-known works are Colombian Love (2004), starring Mili Avital and Asi Cohen; Kicking Out Shoshana (2014); Ibiza (2015), starring Dvir Benedek; Four by Four (2016), starring Oshri Cohen and Shlomi Koriat.

In television Kanot worked on The Arbitrator (2007-2014), written by Reshef Levi. Kanot wrote the script for the Israeli show Shabatot Vehagim (2004) along with Eran Kolirin. Kanot directed Meorav Yerushalmi (2007), starring Shmil Ben Ari; Pushers (Bnei Or) (2022); Double (Kefula) (2015-2019), starring Noa Kirel.

== Filmography ==
=== Feature films ===
Year	Title	Additional information
1998	It's Not Like Us	Drama
2001	Laila Lelo Lola	Comedy, made for TV (Hot).
2004	Colombian Love (Ahava Colombianit)	Starring: Mili Avital and Assi Cohen.
2005	Moon Wolves (Yarech Shel Zeevim)	Drama, based on a true story, made for TV.
2014	The Goal (Kicking Out Shoshana)	Sport comedy, starring Gal Gadot and Oshri Cohen.
2015	Ibiza	Comedy, filmed in Spain, starring Dvir Benedek.
2016	Four by Four (Arba Al Arba)	Comedy, starring Shlomi Koriat and Oshri Cohen.
2022	Love You Charlie (Ohev Otkha Charlie)	Crime comedy, based on a true story, starring Michael Aloni and Alon Abutbul

=== Television ===
Year	Title	Additional information
1996	The Mossad (Ha Mossad)	Drama, co-production Israel–Argentina, starring Gustavo Guillén
1998–2002	The Real Thing (Chalomot Neurim)	Romantic comedy
2000	Shabatot Vehagim	Drama, Kanot wrote first season with Eran Kolirin, starring Alon Abutbul, Yael Abecassis and Romi Aboulafia.
2002	Closed Case (Tik Sagur)	Police drama, premiered on Israeli Channel 10, starring Amos Lavi and written by Reshef Levi.
2005–2009	Once in a Life (Ha-Chayim AL-PI Y)	Docu-realty/comedy, starring Aviv Geffen and Ninet Tayeb.
2007–2014	The Arbitrator (Ha-Borer)	Crime comedy, written by: Reshef Levi, starring Yehuda Levi and Ania Bukstein
2018–2020	Double (Kfula)	Musical comedy, starring Noa Kirel.
2021	Pushers (Bney Or)	Social drama, based on a true story.
2023	Three (Thalatha)	Musical, social drama, produced by paramount TV, nominated for best-series TV Festival De Cannes.
