= Ania Bukstein =

Israeli actress, singer and pianist

- אניה בוקשטיין
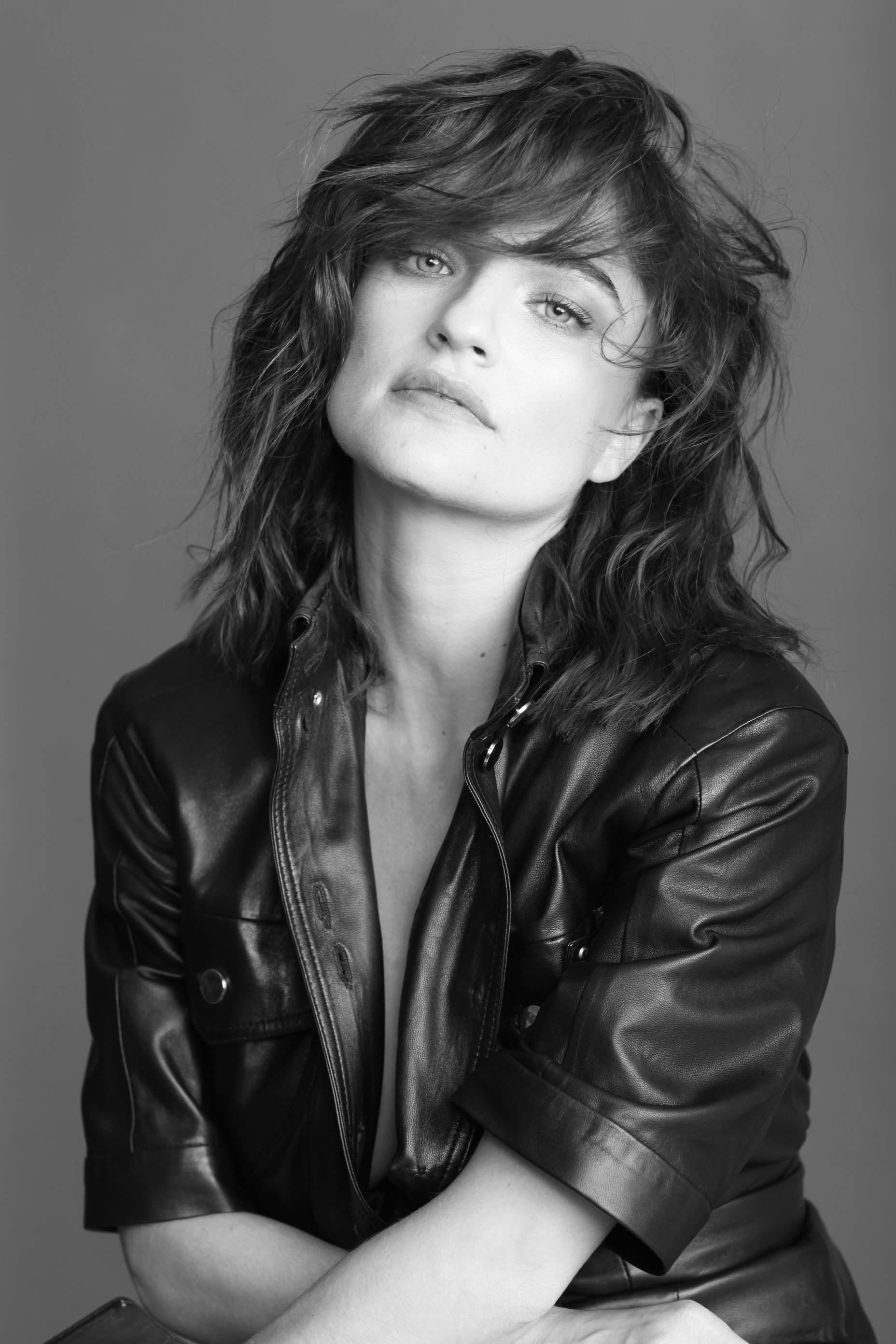
- Born: 7 June 1982 (age 43); Moscow, Russian SFSR, Soviet Union
- Occupations: Actress; singer; pianist
- Years active: 1994–present

Ania Bukstein (Hebrew: אניה בוקשטיין; Russian: Аня Букштейн, Anya Bukshteyn; born 7 June 1982) is an Israeli actress, singer and pianist, performing in Hebrew, Russian, French, and English.

== Early life ==
Bukstein was born in Moscow, USSR, in 1982, to a family of Russian-Jewish descent. Her parents are both doctors; her mother is a speech-language pathologist, and her father is a neuro-oncologist. Growing up in Moscow, she studied classical piano as a child starting at the age of 5, which she says she studied with a strict discipline common amongst children in the Soviet Union. She and her parents repatriated to Israel in the early 1990s when she was 7 years old, while her grandparents still live in Moscow. She began her acting career at age 12. However, in Israel she gave up her dream of becoming a professional concert pianist. As a teenager, she attended Thelma Yellin Arts High School in Givatayim, Israel.

After her high school graduation, she served as a soldier in the Israeli Air Force Band for two years. After studying French, she then received a scholarship to study in Paris.

== Career ==
=== Music ===
A classically trained pianist, Bukstein performed many songs on piano for the musical telenovela series HaShir Shelanu. In 2013 released Bukshtein an album of songs she has written, Sunday, featuring eight songs written and composed by her. The album was produced by Johnny Goldstein, who also co-wrote the song "One Day" from it. The singles featured in the album are "One Day", "No One" and "Seven Minutes".

In June 2017, in collaboration with DJ Ofer Nissim, she released another single, "Boy or Man". She also performs classic Israeli songs, in state and memorial ceremonies, including presenting the official Israel Independence Day broadcast. In addition, she performs with the Israel Philharmonic Orchestra.

=== Film and television ===
In 1994, when she was twelve, Bukstein got her first cinematic role and worked alongside Etti Ankri and Shuli Rand and portrayed Anna, the main character in the film Eretz Hadasha (A New Country), a film about a young Holocaust survivor and her difficulties after she moved to Israel in 1950 with her older brother. For her performance on the film she was nominated for an Ophir Award for best actress, she was the youngest actress to be nominated in this category.

In 2003, she appeared in Dover Kosashvili's Matana MiShamayim. In 2005, she co-starred in the Shmuel Hasfari directed film Shoshelet Schwartz, for her performance, she was once again nominated for an Ophir Award for best actress. Later that year, she portrayed Anastasia during the first season of the children's television series Rosh Gadol. In 2006, she portrayed Tamara weiss in the third and fourth season of the musical drama series HaShir Shelanu. In 2007, she starred in Avi Nesher's critically acclaimed film The Secrets as Neomi Hess, a curious Haredi teenager who discovers her attraction to another girl at a religious school. On 6 September 2007, in the Israeli 'People of the Year Ceremony', she won the 'Woman of The Year in Cinema' award for her performance in The Secrets. That same year, she portrayed Irena Kovlova in the crime drama series The Arbitrator on Hot 3 channel.

In 2008, she appeared on Israeli comedy television series Kapiot (Spoons) on Channel 2. In 2010, she portrayed Adi in Kalevet (Rabies), and later appeared on sitcom Naor's Friends. In 2014, she portrayed Silvy in the comedy series Amamiot. Later that year, she co-starred in False Flag and portrayed Asia Brinditch, an Israeli kindergarten teacher who is implicated together with 4 other Israeli citizens in a high-profile kidnapping that is covered by the media all over the world.

In 2016, she portrayed the mysterious priestess Kinvara in the sixth season of the HBO series Game of Thrones. In November Bukstein won Wolf for the Best Actress award in PÖFF Festival for her role in A Quiet Heart who also won the award for the Best Film. In 2017, Bukstein appeared in the American TV series Genius, portraying the Russian spy Margarita Konenkova, with whom Albert Einstein had an affair after the death of his second wife.

=== Theater ===
In 1998, she appeared in a children's play Tzav Tzav HaMelech (King Turtle Turtle, based upon Leah Goldberg's translation to Dr. Seuss' Yertle the Turtle). In 2002, she starred in Leah Goldberg written play Baalat HaArmon (The Palace Owner). In 2005, she played in the drama play Milhama (War) at Habima Theatre, for her performance in the play she won the Israeli Theater Award for 'Most Promising Actress of The Year'. In the Hanukkah holiday of 2007, she played in the musical Narnia at Tel Aviv Performing Arts Center. In 2008, she played in the musical Oliver! at the Beit Lessin Theater. In 2010, she portrayed Hayyah in Joshua Sobol's play Ghetto at the Cameri Theater. She starred as Maria von Trapp in the 2013 Israeli version of the musical The Sound of Music at Tel Aviv Performing Arts Center. Before the pandemic of COVID-19 Bukstein starred as Elle Woods in the Israeli production of Legally Blonde.

=== Voice acting ===
In 1994, she voiced Marie in the Hebrew version of the 1970 film The Aristocats. She also narrated and sang the intro song of Dick Bruna's Miffy Storybook Classics: The Original Series which aired that year in Channel 2 (Reshet). In 2002, she voiced Jane in the Hebrew version of Return to Never Land. From 2003 to 2006 she voiced Clover in Totally Spies! on Disney Channel Israel. From 2004 to 2007 She voiced Daphne Blake in the Scooby-Doo franchise. She voiced Susan Pevensie in the Hebrew version of The Chronicles of Narnia: The Lion, the Witch and the Wardrobe in 2005 and Princess Selenia in the Hebrew version of Arthur and the Invisibles (2006).

== Personal life ==
Bukstein reportedly dated her HaShir Shelanu co-star, Israeli actor Ran Danker.

She married Israeli real estate developer Dotan Weiner (cousin of Galit Gutman) in 2013. In 2018, they had their first daughter.

She speaks Russian, Hebrew, French, Italian and English.

== Filmography ==
=== Film ===
Year	Title	Role	Notes
1994	New Land	Anna	
2003	Matana MiShamayim	Marina	Fira's daughter
2005	Schwartz Denesty	Anna	
2006	Foul Gesture	Arkadia	
2007	The Secrets	Neomi Hess	
2010	Rabies	Adi	
2012	The Conductor	Anna	Russian film
2012	Dead Europe	Amina	Australian film
2013	Friends from France	Vera	French film
2017	A Quiet Heart	Naomi	
2022	The Other Widow	Natasha	Nomination - Ophir Award for Best Supporting Actress

=== Television ===
Year	Title	Role	Notes
2005	Rosh Gadol	Anastasia	Season 1
2006	Our Song	Tamara Weiss	
2007	Spoons	Various	Sketch comedy
2007–2009	Screenz	Shiri	
2007–2014	The Arbitrator	Irena Kovlova	
2011	Naor's Friends	Silvy Knafo	Episode: "The First Years of the Undercover Bimbo"
2014	Amamiyot	Silvy Knafo / Slavit Kanaf	
2015	False Flag	Asia Brinditch	
2015	Plan B	Herself	Cameo
2016	Game of Thrones	Kinvara – The Red Priestess of Volantis	Episode: "The Door"
2017	Genius	Margarita Konenkova	Episode: "Chapter 9"
2023	For All Mankind	Tatyana Volkova	3 episodes
2025	The German	Anna Zahavi	Main Role

== Awards and nominations ==
Year	Award	Category	Nominated work	Result	Ref.
2004	Israeli Film Academy	Best Supporting Actress	Schwartz Denesty	Nominated	
2007	Israeli Film Academy	Best Actress	The Secrets	Nominated	
2016	Israeli Film Academy	Best Actress	A Quiet Heart	Nominated	
2016	PÖFF Festival	Best Actress	A Quiet Heart	Won	
