= HaShir Shelanu =

Israeli telenovela

- season 4 title card
- Genre: Telenovela, Musical, Comedy, Thriller, Drama, Soap Opera, Crime, Romantic
- Created by: Yoav Tzafir; Ori Gross; Tmira Yardeni
- Written by: Ori Gross
- Directed by: Shirley Stern; Yoav Tzafir
- Starring: Ninet Tayeb; Ran Danker; Maya Dagan; Efrat Baumwald; Pini Tabger; Eliana Bekier; Amos Tamam; Yuval abramovich; Guy Zu-Aretz; Oshri Cohen; Yael Sharoni; Saar Badishi; Niv Raz; Avigail Ariely; Aliza Rozen; Hanna Laslo; Dalik Wolinitz; Lior Ashkenazi; Ania Bukstein; Rona-Lee Shimon; Ido Mosseri; Nina Kotler; Anat Magen Shabo; Dana Adini; Eli Altonio; Ran Bechor; Amikam Levi; Mali Levi; Leora Riblin; Galit Gutman; Agam Rodberg
- Opening theme: "Od Me'at" by Ninet Tayeb and the cast members
- Country of origin: Israel
- Original language: Hebrew
- No. of seasons: 4
- No. of episodes: 366

Production
- Producers: Tmira Yardeni; Dudu Yardeni; Tzvika Hadar
- Running time: approx. 40 minutes
- Production company: Teddy Productions

Original release
- Network: yes stars Channels; Channel 2 (Keshet)
- Release: March 21, 2004 – April 24, 2007

Related
- Tichon HaShir Shelanu (2009–2010) Tanuchi! (2012); Danny Hollywood (2008–2009)

HaShir Shelanu (Hebrew: השיר שלנו, lit. Our Song) was an Israeli daily musical drama starring Ninet Tayeb that took place for four seasons on the "Yes" Israeli Cinema channel of the yes satellite TV provider and repeating on Channel 2. The first episode was broadcast in March 2004, The last episode was broadcast in April 2007.

== General plot ==
=== Season 1 ===
118 episodes
Ninet (Tayeb) is a young, unknown girl from the country who comes to Tel-Aviv and works with her cousin Ronnie (Niv Raz) at his cafeteria in Yardena Tamir's (Alisa Rosen) Academy of Music. After school hours are over Ninet goes to the classroom and sings. Her talent is serendipitously discovered by the music teacher, Doron Sadeh (Sa'ar Badishi) who has her enrolled in the school. Ninet falls in love with Zohar Lahat (Ran Danker) and the couple go on a rocky road towards happiness disturbed mainly by Noa Shahar (Efrat Baumwald) who wants Zohar for herself. Noa’s best friend Dana Snir (Aliyana Bakyer) and her mother Naomi (Hana Laslow) help her by driving Zohar and Ninet apart.

=== Season 2 ===
100 episodes
Three years after graduating from the academy, Ninet and Zohar became the country's most well-known couple and they plan to get married. They have moved into the luxury "Sun and Beach" apartment complex in Tel-Aviv and, surprisingly enough, their friends from the academy have also moved into the complex. Due to the ending of the first season in which Givon (Guy Zu-Aretz) was killed while trying to murder Ninet and frame Naomi, his brother Ariel (Oshri Cohen) and sister (Yael Sharoni) are in town and plan their revenge on Ninet, Naomi and Noa. While conspiring to assassinate them, Ariel falls in love with Ninet.

=== Season 3 ===
73 episodes
At the beginning of the third season viewers discover that the first two seasons of the show were actually a TV show called "Her Song". The two leading actors in "Her Song", Rani Aviv who played Zohar Lahat (Ran Danker) and Yonatan Barak who played Ariel Silver (Oshri Cohen), are preparing to enter the army a day after they finished filming the last episode of the second season. Rani enlists and joins the paratroopers' unit and Yonathan goes to a military band. Ninet is forced to perform service work in the band after her partner indicted her for an act he committed himself. All the other characters from the first two seasons occasionally appear by their real names. New characters join the show. At the end of the season Ninet and Yotam start dating after a rivalry.

(The reason the series' plot changed was due to Ninet's tight schedules and she could not continue the third season as regularly as in the other seasons, and yet the creators did not want to replace Ninet with another actress. In addition, the second season ended with a full ending and was planned to be the final season. Towards the middle of the third season Ninet returns to play her main character regularly until the end of the serie.)

=== Season 4 ===
75 episodes
Ninet and Yotam have been in a relationship for six months. Karin and Tamara were unconscious for half a year. Tamara loses her memory. Shuki has cancer and wants Ninet to become the band's director, Ninet responds to Shuki's request and is forced to direct the band and work with Karin (the band's officer). Karin Koren discovers that Yotam murdered her on purpose. Karin assures Yotam that she will not tell anyone he shot her if he starts dating her and leaves Ninet. Later in the season it is revealed that the shooting investigation supervisor, Nora Spector, is Karin's mother. Karin blackmails Yotam that if he does not kill Ninet she will tell her all the secrets. Yotam starts cheating on Ninet, Ninet has a relationship with Rani who feels lonely and they both find solace in each other. At the end of the series Yotam almost kills Ninet after he confesses to her and reveals to her all the secrets and secrets of Karin, but he is unable and willing to kill Karin, Karin shoots Tamara (who then survives), Yotam shoots Karin and rescues Ninet. After Yotam and Ninet exchanged glances, IDF soldiers fired at Yotam.

== Cast ==
=== Seasons 1 and 2 ===
Actor/Actress	Role	S1	S2
Ninet Tayeb	Ninet Levy		
Ran Danker	Zohar Lahat		
Efrat Baumwald	Noa Shahar / Bat-Sheva Atias		
Maya Dagan	Michal "Mickey" Applebaum		
Pini Tavger	Nahman "Nahi" Ben-Hagay		
Guy Zu-Aretz	Givon Kaspi (Silver)		
Eliana Bekier	Dana Snir		
Yuval Abramovich	Roei Bar		
Amos Tamam	Yariv Arad		
Oshri Cohen	Ariel Silver		
Yael Sharoni	Sharon Silver		
Golan Azulai	Naftali Atias		
Saar Badishi	Doron Sadeh		
Abigail Arieli	Gali Naveh		
Niv Raz	Ronel "Roni" Levy		
Dalik Wolinitz	Udi Snir		
Rita Shukrun	Rachel Levy		
Elia Aharoni Stern	Elia Apfelbaum Ben-Hagay		
Hanna Laslo	Naomi Shahar		
Aliza Rosen	Yardena Tamir		
Tuvia Tzafir	Menahem Robert "Robbie" Aviv		
Jimmy Hermilio	Claudio		
Yoav Tzafir	Ram Segev		
Eliana Magon	Osher Levy		
Alona Wind	Neta Sadeh		
Itai Segev	Yechiel Ben-Hagay		
Asaf Goldstein	Lior		
Michael Hanegbi	Himself		
Mali Levi-Gershon	Herself		
Ricky Gal	Rivka Nahshol		
Shay Peled	Adam Harel		
Lilit Nagar	Lilit Silver		
Aviad Kisos	Gidi Barak		
Sasha Grishkov	Rakefet Shavit		
Gadi Ravinovich	Isaiah Tanzer		
Haim Banay	Yechzekel Levy		
Adam Perry	Adam		
Avi Panini	Alon Bar		
Zvika Hadar	Zvi Pinkos		
Alex Ansky	Yagel Applebaum		
Hila Nachshon	Shirly		
Sara Sharon	Zipi Lahat		
Moran Eizenstein	Herself		
Miki Kam	Yemima Morton		
Tzedi Zarfati	Zadok Franco		
Yigal Shilon	Himself		
Svika Pick	Daniel Sharon		
Gidi Gov	Shimi		
Adi Ashkenazi	Herself		
Shay Gabso	Himself		
Michal Tsafir	Michal Nahman		
Chelli Goldenberg	Eva Snir		
Cabra Casay	Herself		

=== Seasons 3 and 4 ===
Actor/Actress	Role	S3	S4
Ninet Tayeb	Ninet Tayeb		
Ran Danker	Rani Aviv		
Oshri Cohen	Yonatan Barak		
Lior Ashkenazi	Yotam "Yo-Yo" Bareket		
Ania Bukstein	Tamara Weiss		
Rona-Lee Shimon	Shiri Gold		
Anat Magen Shabo	Heli Banay		
Dana Adini	Shemesh Frost		
Mali Levi-Gershon	Elinor Shilon		
Eli Altonio	Tziyon Maymon		
Ido Mosseri	Tal Sasson/Sassi Tal		
Ran Bechor	Harel Navon		
Liora Rivlin	Lily Gold		
Nina Kotler	Karin Koren		
Oshik Levi	Dan "Duba" Kidron		
Amikam Levi	Shuki Star / Joshua Kochavi		
Amos Lavie	Arie Weiss		
Yossi Marshek	Shmulik		
Uri Rawitz	Niki		
Dalik Wolinitz	Udi Snir		
Gila Almagor	Nora Spector		
Galit Gutman	Ronit Bareket		
Agam Rudberg	Shai Bareket		
Michal Yannai	Miri Shilon		
Hili Yalon	Shelly Frost		
Albert Iluz	Cernea Barak		
Dana International	God		
Yoav Tsafir	Ram Segev		
Nir Friedman	Horaf Dayan		
Mati Atlas	Avery Źeta		
Tali Oren	Cila Lipocycelas		
Yoav Cohen	Shmil		
Aviv Zemer	Tomer		
Adit Hazur	Dr. Rona Tavor		
Tal Mosseri	Yariv Tal		
Rotem Zisman-Cohen	Ronnie		
Hanna Maron	Hanna Gold		
Yuval Semo	Corcom		
Adam Perry	Adam		
Amos Lavi	Aria Weiss		
Yisrael Aharoni	Aharon Aharon		
Margalit Tzan’ani	Margalit Har Tzedi		
Tom Avni	Himself		
Sivan Rahav-Meir	Herself		
David Dvir	Roman		

==== Featured as themselves ====
Actor/Actress	S3	S4
Maya Dagan		
Yuval Abramovich		
Hanna Laslo		
Yael Sharoni		
Elia Aharoni Stern		
Pini Tavger		
Hila Nachshon		
Zvika Hadar		
Tom Avni		
Sivan Rahav-Meir		
