= Ido Mosseri =

Israeli actor (born 1978)

- עידו מוסרי
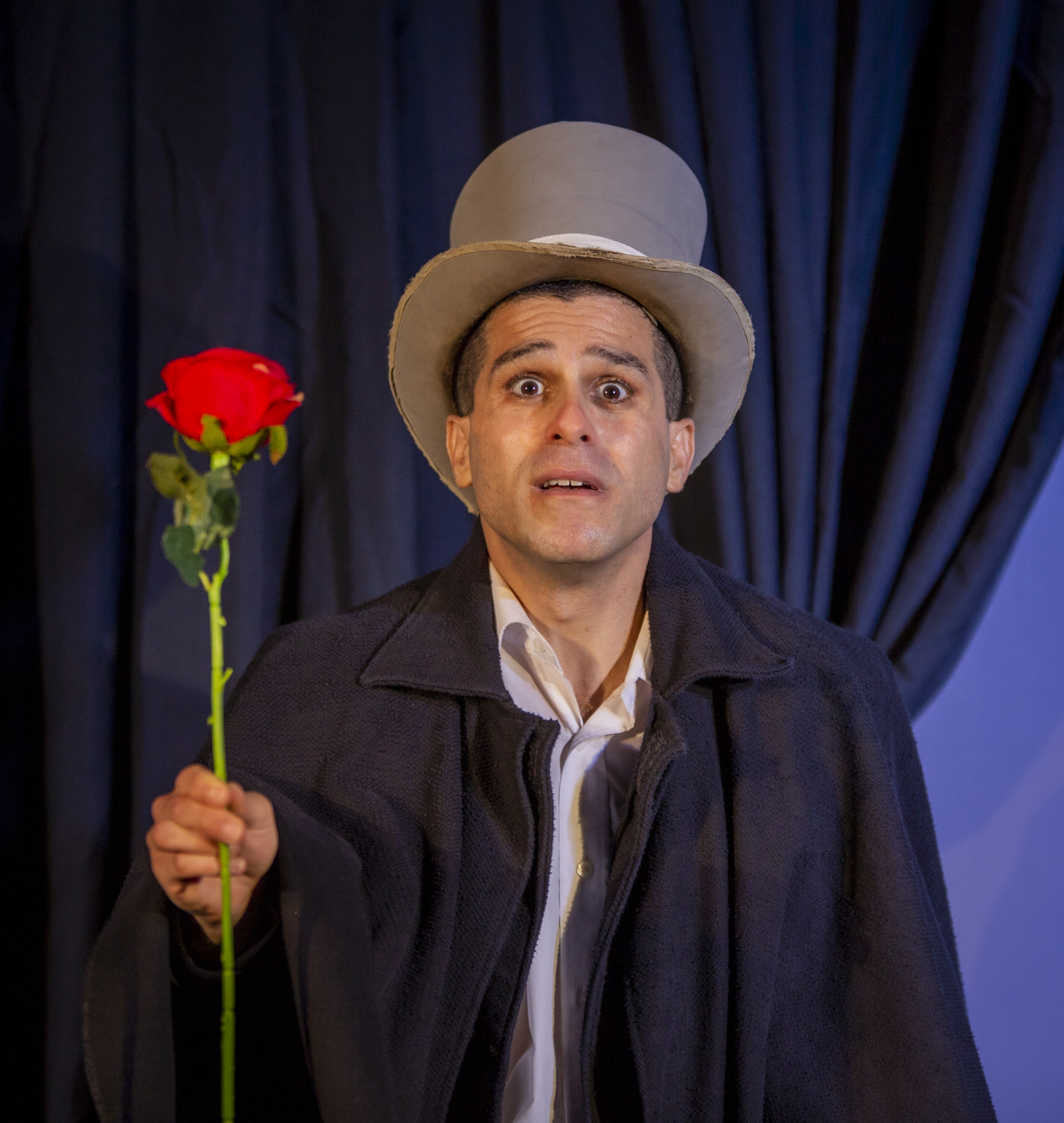
- Mosseri in 2021
- Born: 17 April 1978 (age 48); Tel Aviv, Israel
- Occupations: Actor; voice actor; musician; television presenter
- Years active: 1987–present
- Relatives: Tal Mosseri (brother)

Ido Mosseri (Hebrew: עידו מוסרי; born 17 April 1978) is an Israeli actor, voice actor, musician, director, and television presenter.

== Biography ==
=== Early life ===
Mosseri was born in Tel Aviv, to a Jewish family, to a father of Sephardi-Mizrahi origin and a mother of Ashkenazi origin. The father of Egyptian-Jewish descent and the mother of Hungarian-Jewish descent.

In addition to being a child actor, he was educated at Arison Campus. He later studied at Thelma Yellin High School of Arts. He was drafted into the Israeli army at the age of 18 and after his army service, he continued to study acting at Nissan Nativ's studio in Tel Aviv.

=== Film and television ===
Mosseri’s first appearance on television was in the children's program Tofsim Rosh in 1987. He participated in several other Israeli television shows, amongst them were Service Not Included and A Matter of Time. Between 2006 and 2007, he participated in the third and fourth seasons of the Israeli daily comedy musical drama Our Song. He also received guest roles in the television shows The Pyjamas, Polishuk, The Arbitrator and Naor's Friends. In 2017 he dubbed the characters of Aviv Geffen, Eyal Golan, Yair Lapid, Static and Ehud Barak in the puppet series Country of the Dwarves. As of 2020, he began appearing on the Israeli sketch comedy show The Jews are Coming, where he has impersonated various people such as Benjamin Netanyahu.

During the course of his studying he participated in several student movies and also participated in the 2003 film Exile To Heaven, the 2004 film Late Reaction and the 2006 film Offside. Mosseri achieved some international roles as well. In 2008, he was a central cast member playing the role of Oori Shulimson in You Don't Mess with the Zohan starring Adam Sandler. The two worked together once more in the 2011 film Bucky Larson: Born to Be a Star, in which the latter was a producer, and again in the 2023 film You Are So Not Invited to My Bat Mitzvah.

=== Dubbing ===
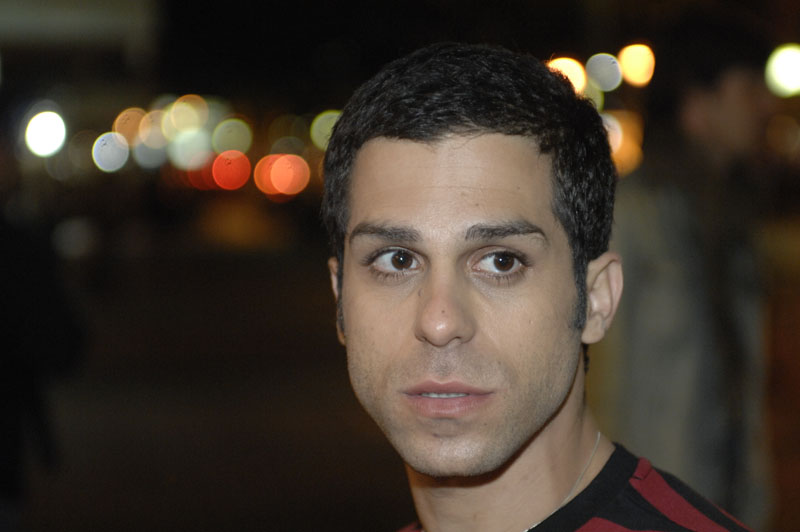
Mosseri in 2013

Throughout the years, Mosseri also participated greatly in dubbing animated television shows and movies into the Hebrew language. For television, he has received attention for dubbing the title character in SpongeBob SquarePants. He also dubbed Krusty the Clown in The Simpsons, Touya Kinomoto in Cardcaptor Sakura, Jackie Chan in Jackie Chan Adventures, Meowth in Pokémon, Leonardo in Teenage Mutant Ninja Turtles, Sonic in Sonic X, King Koopa in Super Mario Bros. Super Show!, Carlos in Transformers: Armada, Batman in Batman Beyond, Oscar the Grouch in Rechov Sumsum, Fuzzy Lumpkins in The Powerpuff Girls and others.

In Mosseri’s film dubbing roles, he reprised the role of SpongeBob in the films and he also served as the voice director for the first film. He made his first dubbing contribution as a child voicing Oliver in Oliver & Company. His other roles include Red in Stuart Little, and he also voiced Stuart Little in Stuart Little 3: Call of the Wild, replacing Gil Sassover, Crane in Kung Fu Panda, Marty in Madagascar, Jim Hawkins in Treasure Planet, Alpha in Up, Syndrome in The Incredibles, Krusty, Professor Frink, Otto and others in The Simpsons Movie, Kovu in The Lion King II: Simba's Pride, The Fish in The Cat in the Hat, Terry McGinnis in Batman Beyond: Return of the Joker, Donatello in TMNT, Duke Caboom in Toy Story 4, Bruno Madrigal in Encanto, Andy in Magic Camp, Sebastian J. Cricket in Guillermo del Toro's Pinocchio, Mario in The Super Mario Bros. Movie and Taka/Scar in Mufasa: The Lion King. He has worked closely with Shiri Gadni, Yoram Yosefsberg, Gilad Kleter, Dikla Hadar and other dubbers.

=== Stage ===
As a child, Mosseri was very active on stage. During his teen years, he acted in the theatre organisation of the Israel Defense Forces. In addition, he performed mainly at the Gesher Theatre, where he starred in theatrical adaptations of The King and I, Les Misérables, Macbeth, In 2006 he played the King in musical Rumpelstiltskin. In 2008 he also starred in a stage adaptation of Fiddler on the Roof at Cameri Theater. Mosseri has also worked at the Beersheba Theatre, the Beit Lessin Theatre, the Habima Theatre as well as the Haifa Theatre.

=== Music ===
Between 1992 and 1995, Mosseri was a member of the Tel Aviv Youth Band. In 2009, he released a spoken word album which he signed with Hed Arzi Music. He also performed a song on Liran Danino’s debut album in 2012.

Mosseri has also performed the theme songs of some international television shows in Hebrew such as Captain N: The Game Master, Fireman Sam and The Bear's Island.

=== Personal life ===
Mosseri is the younger brother of popular actor and entertainment personality Tal Mosseri. He also dated actress Ella Rosenzweig for a while.
