= Agam Rudberg =

Israeli actress and model (born 1986)

- אגם רודברג
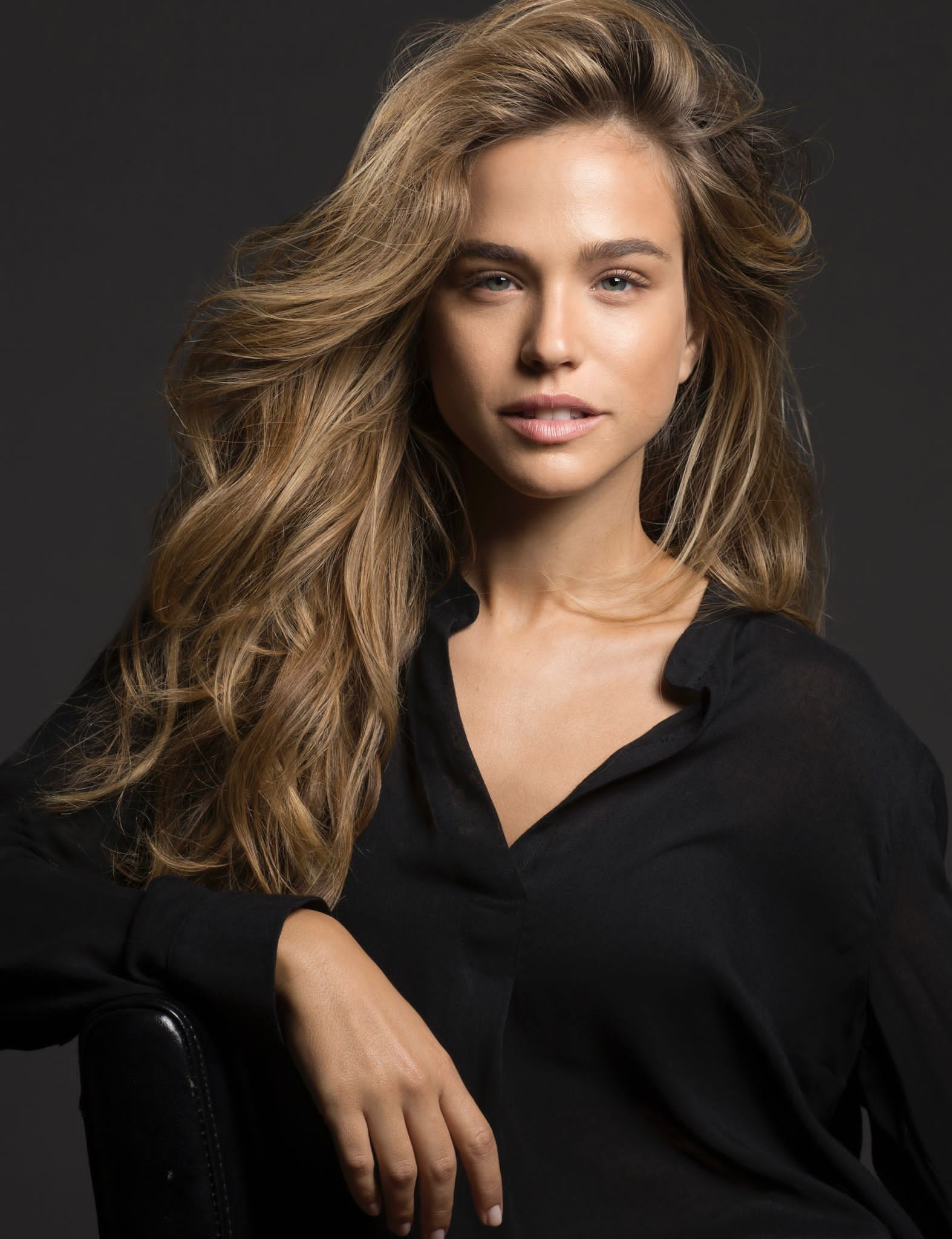
- Rudberg in 2022
- Born: 8 February 1986 (age 40); Ramat Tzvi, Israel
- Occupations: Actress, model
- Years active: 2003–present

Agam Rudberg (Hebrew: אגם רודברג; born 8 February 1986) is an Israeli actress and model.

== Early life ==
Rudberg was born in moshav Ramat Tzvi, Israel, to an Israeli-born father of Ashkenazi Romanian-Jewish and Lithuanian-Jewish descent, and to a Moroccan Jewish mother. When she was 10, her father died.

In 2005, Rudberg enlisted as a soldier in the Israel Defense Forces. She served in the IDF theatre of the Education and Youth Corps.

== Career ==
Rudberg was discovered by a model agent at age 13. She became a model for the shoe brand Skechers and has featured in international magazines, including Maxim, and modeled for brands, including Remington Products.

In 2003, Rudberg appeared in Israel Channel 2's telenovela Love Around the Corner.

In 2004, she took part in Festigal, an annual Israeli song and dance show for children, and has taken part many times since.

In 2006, she appeared in Israeli telenovela HaShir Shelanu. She has subsequently appeared in many Israeli television shows, becoming one of Israel's more popular actresses during the early and mid-2000s and being voted as "Israel's sexiest woman".

In 2014, Rudberg took a role in Temporarily Dead, a medical drama.

== Personal life ==
Rudberg has led a campaign to raise funds for the treatment of skin cancer in Israel.

She criticized Bar Refaeli for evading the military draft in Israel, saying: "The way Bar Refaeli evaded army service wasn't right. It's worth trying to serve in the army, and only if you don't feel good there to try and do something."

== Filmography ==
=== Television ===
| Year | Title | Role | Notes |
|---|---|---|---|
| 2003 | Abba Shahor Lavan | Michal | |
| 2003–2005 | Ahava Me'ever Lapina | Shirli Barzilai | TV series, 3 episodes |
| 2006 | HaShir Shelanu | Shai Bareket | TV series, 1 episode |
| 2009 | Ha-Alufa | | TV series, 2 episodes |
| 2010–2012 | Split | Carmel | TV series, 85 episodes |
| 2013 | Ptzuim BaRosh | Zohar Fine | TV series, 9 episodes |
| 2014 | Temporarily Dead | Dana Riskin | TV series, main character |
