= Kicking Out Shoshana =

- Theatrical Film Poster
- Directed by: Shay Kanot
- Written by: Oded Rozen
- Produced by: Leon Edery; Moshe Edery; Shai Eines; Dafna Prenner
- Starring: Gal Gadot; Oshri Cohen; Eli Finish; Mariano Idelman
- Cinematography: Ofer Inov
- Edited by: Isaac Sehayek
- Music by: Daniel Salomon
- Production companies: United King Films; Artza Productions
- Distributed by: United King Films
- Release date: July 17, 2014
- Running time: 100 minutes
- Country: Israel
- Language: Hebrew

Kicking Out Shoshana (Hebrew: שושנה חלוץ מרכזי Shoshana Khaloutz Merkazi) is a 2014 Israeli comedy-sports film directed by Shay Kanot. It features Gal Gadot in her first role in an Israeli film. The film also stars Oshri Cohen, Mariano Idelman and Eli Finish. It was released on July 17, 2014. The film alludes to the Beitar Jerusalem F.C.

== Premise ==
A notorious Israeli fotballer’tries to seduce the girlfriend of a mafia boss. The latter threatens him and forces him to pretend he is homosexual in order to ruin his public image.

== Cast ==
- Gal Gadot as Mirit Ben Harush
- Oshri Cohen as Ami Shushan
- Eli Finish as Kushi Bokobza
- Mariano Idelman as Dede Ben Shabat
- Angel Bonanni as Liran Shimoni
- Yossi Marshek as Sami Abu Salach
- Yaniv Biton as Nachi
- Rotem Keinan as Cheelik Eliraz
- Einat Weitzman as Paz

== Production ==
The film features Gal Gadot after she completed her role in The Fast and the Furious franchise. She went back to Israel to shoot her first Israeli film. Principal photography for the film took place in Jerusalem.

== Release ==
The film is co-produced and distributed by United King Films. It was released on July 17, 2014, in Israel and also released in the United States at the Israeli Film Festival.

== Reception ==
Tablet praised the film Haaretz called it the most politically incorrect Israeli film of all time. The Jerusalem Post stated that the film was fun but not subtle at all.
