= The Door (Game of Thrones) =

- Game of Thrones episode
- Episode no.: Season 6 Episode 5
- Directed by: Jack Bender
- Written by: David Benioff; D. B. Weiss
- Cinematography by: Jonathan Freeman
- Editing by: Crispin Green
- Original air date: May 22, 2016
- Running time: 56 minutes

Guest appearances
- Max von Sydow as the Three-eyed Raven; Kristian Nairn as Hodor; Richard E. Grant as Izembaro; Essie Davis as Lady Crane; Pilou Asbæk as Euron Greyjoy; Gemma Whelan as Yara Greyjoy; Ben Crompton as Eddison Tollett; Ellie Kendrick as Meera Reed; Faye Marsay as The Waif; Jacob Anderson as Grey Worm; Michael Feast as Aeron Greyjoy; Kae Alexander as Leaf; Daniel Portman as Podrick Payne; Darrell D'Silva as an Ironborn; Kevin Eldon as "Ned Stark" actor; Leigh Gill as Bobono; Eline Powell as Bianca; Rob Callender as "Joffrey Baratheon" actor; Eva Butterly as an actress; Vladimir Furdik as The Night King; Ania Bukstein as Kinvara; Gerald Lepkowski as a red priest; Annette Tierney as young Old Nan; Sam Coleman as Young Hodor; Wayne Foskett as Rickard Stark; Sebastian Croft as Young Eddard Stark; Matteo Elezi as Young Benjen Stark; Fergus Leathem as Young Rodrik Cassel; Kate Anthony as a Braavosi woman; Sally Mortemore as a Braavosi woman; Nanna Bryndís Hilmarsdóttir as a musician; Ragnar Þórhallsson as a musician; Arnar Rósenkranz Hilmarsson as a musician; Brynjar Leifsson as a musician; Kristján Páll Kristjánsson as a musician

Episode chronology
← Previous "Book of the Stranger"	Next → "Blood of My Blood"
- Game of Thrones season 6

"The Door" is the fifth episode of the sixth season of HBO's fantasy television series Game of Thrones, and the 55th overall. The episode was written by series co-creators David Benioff and D. B. Weiss, and directed by Jack Bender.

Bran Stark learns the origin of the White Walkers, Jon Snow plans to unite the north against the Boltons, Euron Greyjoy reveals his return to the Iron Islands at the Kingsmoot, Tyrion Lannister meets with the Red Priestess Kinvara, and Daenerys Targaryen sees the depths of Jorah Mormont's devotion to her.

"The Door" received universal acclaim from critics, who found the episode to be emotional with effective action sequences involving the White Walkers and Hodor, in addition to providing "important answers regarding [the show]'s mythos." The adaptation of the Kingsmoot as well as Daenerys's farewell to Jorah were also listed as high points of the episode. Hodor's origin story was presented to the series' co-creators by George R. R. Martin. In the United States, the episode achieved a viewership of 7.89 million in its initial broadcast. For the 68th Primetime Emmy Awards, Jack Bender was nominated for Outstanding Directing for a Drama Series, among the episode's five nominations.

This episode marks the final appearance for Kristian Nairn (Hodor) and Max von Sydow (the Three Eyed Raven).

== Plot ==
=== In Braavos ===
Jaqen offers Arya the assignment of killing an actress named Lady Crane, who is playing Cersei in a play recounting the War of the Five Kings.

=== In the Dothraki Sea ===
Jorah reveals his greyscale to Daenerys. He admits his love for her, and Daenerys orders him to find a cure and return to her so he can be by her side when she conquers Westeros.

=== In Meereen ===
Tyrion summons the red priestess Kinvara, who agrees to preach to the people that Daenerys is the chosen one of the Lord of Light. She also claims to know what originally happened to Varys and why, unnerving the eunuch.

=== On the Iron Islands ===
The members of House Greyjoy argue over the Salt Throne, with Euron being chosen as King. He intends to sail to Slaver's Bay, bring Daenerys Targaryen back to Westeros as his wife, and conquer the Seven Kingdoms with their combined forces. Theon and Yara, realizing Euron will have them put to death, flee with the best ships of the Iron Fleet. Euron orders the Ironborn to begin construction of a new, better fleet.

=== At the Wall ===
Sansa confronts Littlefinger about his decision to marry her to Ramsay. Littlefinger reveals that her great-uncle, the Blackfish, has retaken Riverrun with the Tully army. Sansa orders Brienne to go and recruit the Blackfish for their cause. At a war meeting at Castle Black, Sansa and Jon discuss which of the Northern houses they can rely on to support them. As the Karstarks and Umbers have already sided with House Bolton, Ser Davos suggests asking House Manderly. When Jon decides to rally the two dozen houses still loyal to the Starks, Sansa informs him they can add House Tully to the list, but lies about how she acquired the information.

=== Beyond the Wall ===
Bran's visions give him new insight into the Night King and the White Walkers. During one of his visions, Bran is shown the darkest secret of the Children: they long ago created the White Walkers from captured First Men. While in a vision of Winterfell, Bran hears the cries of Meera, who is trying to save Bran's body while the Children hold back the wights. Bran splits his consciousness by remaining in the vision of the past while simultaneously controlling Hodor in the present. The Night King kills the Three-Eyed Raven, while the Children and Bran's direwolf Summer are eventually killed by the wights. Hodor closes the hideout's door behind them, keeping the wights inside while Meera escapes with Bran. Meera repeatedly orders Hodor to "hold the door" shut while they flee, which results in the wights tearing him apart. In the vision, Bran becomes overwhelmed by the split consciousness and unintentionally enters the mind of Wylis in the vision, forging a connection between the past and the present. With Bran's consciousness inside his head, Wylis suffers a seizure after hearing the echoes of Meera's orders and seeing visions of his own violent death (unknowingly) through Bran, which traumatise him. He begins to repeatedly shout the words "hold the door" while convulsing on the ground, slurring the words together until they become "Hodor." Bran watches on in shock and sadness, finally knowing the sad truth behind what made Hodor the way he was while also being confronted with the grim reality of his gruesome death.

== Production ==
=== Writing ===
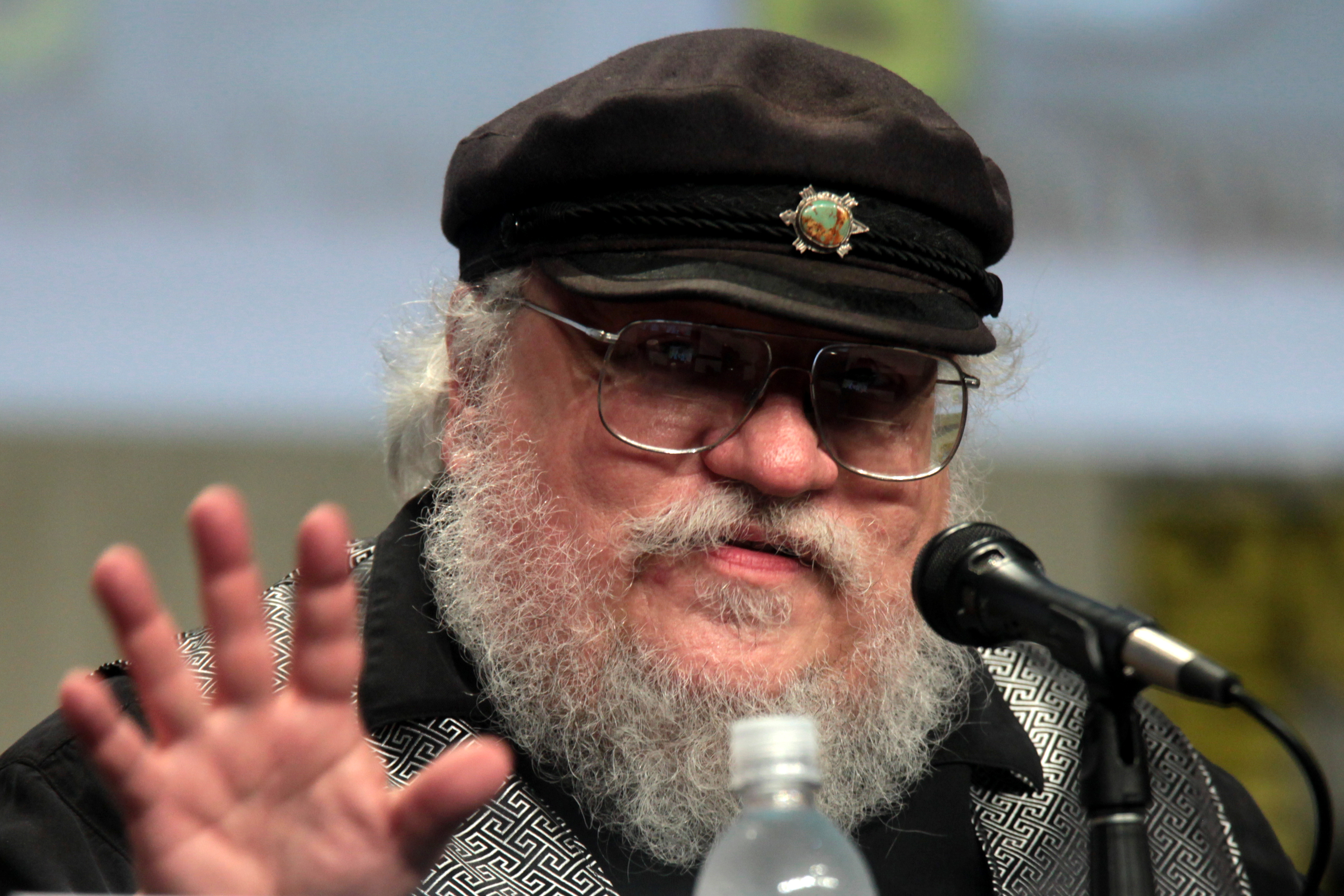
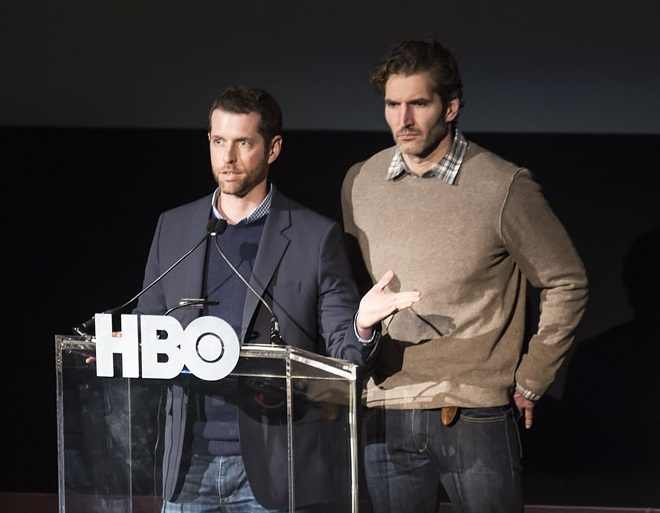
A Song of Ice and Fire author George R. R. Martin (left) presented Hodor's origin story to David Benioff and D. B. Weiss (right), creators of the television adaptation.

"The Door" was written by the series' creators David Benioff and D. B. Weiss. After the episode aired, in the "Inside the Episode" featurette released by HBO for "The Door", Benioff and Weiss revealed that the closing scene involving Hodor's name origin and subsequent death was an idea that was presented to them directly from George R. R. Martin. Benioff stated, "We had this meeting with George Martin where we're trying to get as much information as possible out of him, and probably the most shocking revelation he had for us was when he told us the origin of Hodor and how that name came about. I just remember Dan and I looking at each other when he said that and just being like, 'Holy shit.'" Weiss continued, "It was just one of the saddest and most affecting things. Even sitting in a hotel room having someone tell you this was going to happen in the abstract in some way and that 'hold the door' was the origin of the name Hodor, we just thought that was a really, really heart-breaking idea."

In regards to the White Walkers' origin, Benioff stated "No one's innocent really in this world, and there was just something really beautifully right about the idea that the great nemesis of mankind were created to protect the Children of the Forest from mankind." Weiss noted, "The Night King, who's sort of the embodiment of absolute evil, what you're watching is the creation of that absolute evil, so the absolute evil isn't absolute after all." Benioff also alluded to the many references and foreshadowing throughout the series that preceded the reveal of the Children creating the White Walkers, saying, "There are certain symbols and patterns that recur throughout the show. The first time we saw that was one of the first scenes in the pilot, when Will the ranger sees the Wildling body parts in an odd pattern displayed by the White Walkers. We see it again north of the Wall with the dead horses displayed in a spiral pattern, and then you see it again here and see where these patterns come from, that they're ancient symbols of the Children of the Forest used in their rituals, and the Children of the Forest created the White Walkers."

Ellie Kendrick, who portrays Meera Reed, spoke about the writing of the episode following its airing, and revealed that she was surprised by the scene, saying "When I was reading the episode, I completely forgot that I was a character in the show. I was reading it with such excitement, because this is a real story unfolding, with so many mysteries and quantum leaps and Inception-style traveling between the past and the present. I found it very exciting. So the first time I read it, I was just reading it for enjoyment, really, because it was so well-written and exciting. Once I picked my jaw up off the floor, I was really keen to get started working on it, because it's such an epic sequence."

=== Casting ===
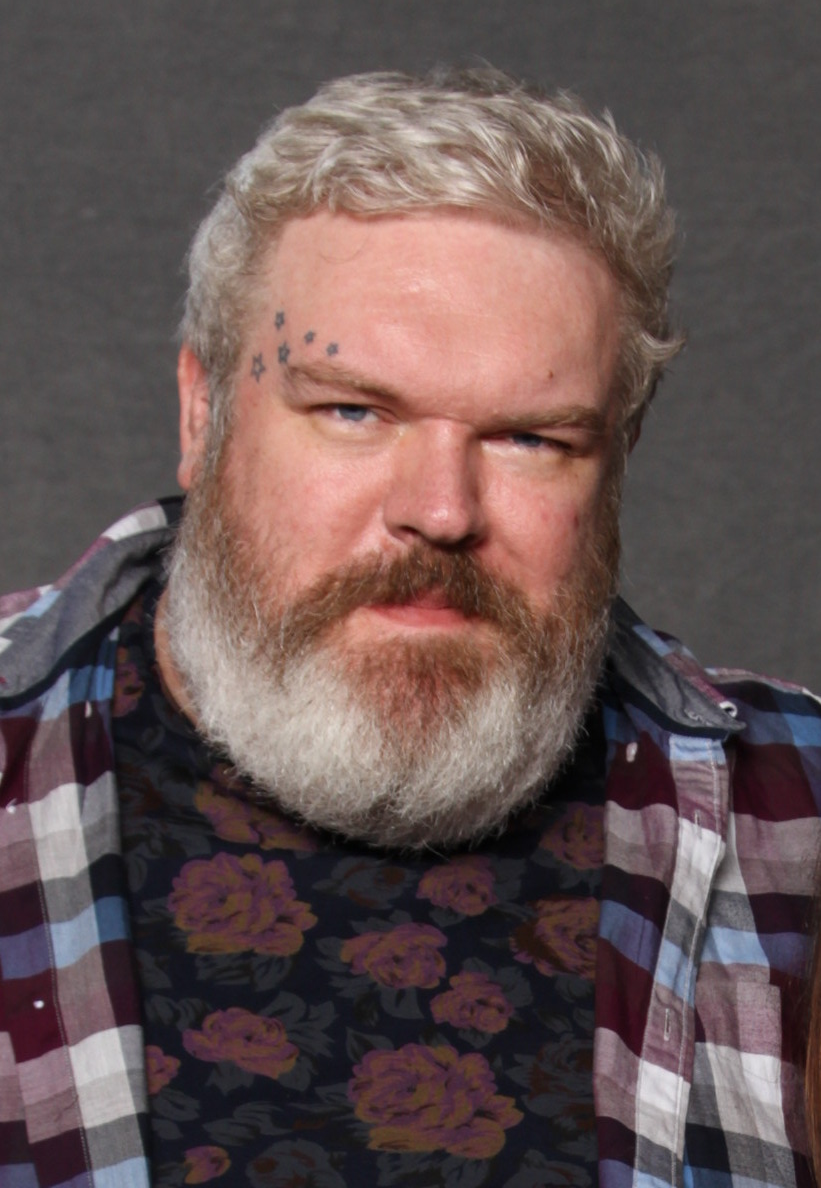
Kristian Nairn has portrayed Hodor since the beginning of the series.

"The Door" marks the final appearance of Kristian Nairn as Hodor, a role Nairn has played since the series pilot. Nairn, who was cast to play Hodor from previously knowing Game of Thrones' casting director from an audition he did for the film Hot Fuzz, admitted in an interview that he was at first unaware of his impending death in the show. He stated, "First I heard from friends, people who had read the script, some other cast members. I think I said laughingly, "So did I survive?" They just gave me a look, and I was like, "Whaat?" Then I had the call from David and Dan, the fateful call everyone gets when your number's up. Then I read the script – which I loved. I loved the scene. I can't think of a better way to go, really. He doesn't give up. He never lets go of that door. For all costs, he's going to stop them from getting to Bran." Reflecting on playing the role, Nairn also went on to note, "People always joke, "Oh you've got the easiest role, you don't have any lines to learn." Anyone who knows anything about acting has been like, "You actually have one of the hardest roles." Because you have to articulate so much without words."

In the Braavos scene, several actors were cast to portray actors participating in a play titled "The Bloody Hand" that re-created the history of the beginning of the series, from an altered point of view. One of the actors that was cast included Richard E. Grant, who portrayed the leader of the theatre troupe, Izembaro. Kevin Eldon, who played the role of Eddard Stark, was also cast, and Essie Davis as the lead actress Lady Crane, among others. The Icelandic band Of Monsters and Men appeared in this episode in a cameo as stage musicians for the stage play.

Israeli actress Ania Bukstein was also introduced in the series as the High Priestess Kinvara, who is brought to Meereen to spread propaganda about Daenerys Targaryen's supposed success at eliminating the problem with the Sons of the Harpy. In an interview with Bukstein she said, "Yes, it's very exciting, but let's calm down. It's not like I'm the new Khaleesi. Game of Thrones came after a ton of hard work. I filmed a lot of audition tapes in front of a white wall at home. I've paid my dues for years." Bukstein also stated that she had previously sent in an audition tape to the series when it was first casting its first season, saying, "A few years ago, when they had only begun to cast the first season of Game of Thrones, I sent an audition tape. I didn't really know for which role, and I mainly didn't know—and neither did the world—what a hit the series was about to become. But I remember that even then, the scenes excited me and I completely went with the style."

=== Filming ===
"The Door" was directed by Jack Bender, a first time director for Game of Thrones. Bender had been previously approached to direct for the series, but declined due to the extensive time commitment involved in shooting, which Bender noted in an interview as having to commit to "four-and-a-half to six months because of the enormity of the episodes."

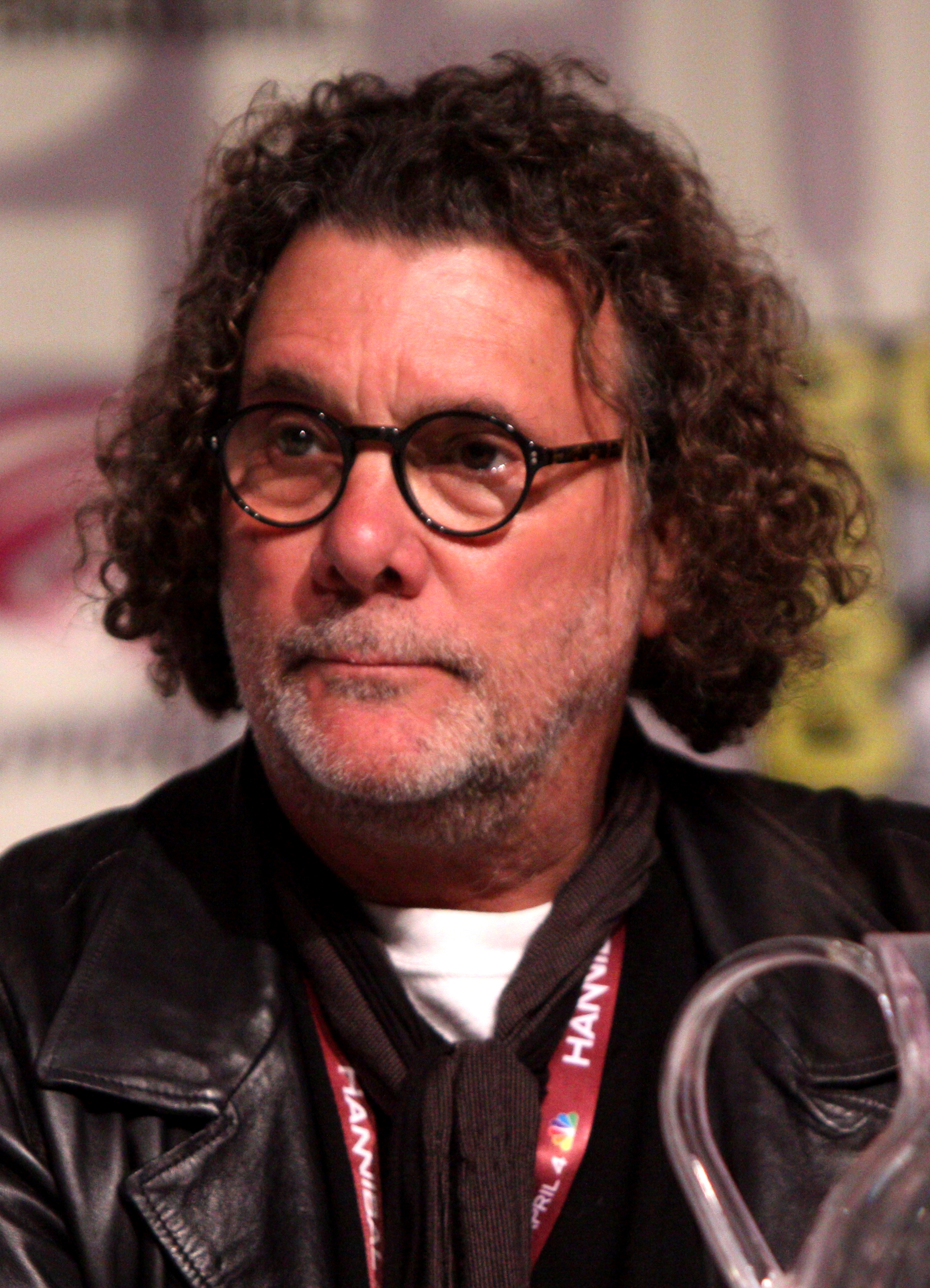
Jack Bender directed "The Door", his first episode in the series.

Shortly after the airing of "The Door", HBO released a featurette titled "Anatomy of a Scene" which went into greater detail about the creation of the final scene at the weirwood cave. Bender was interviewed for the segment, and stated "I knew it was going to be a lot of stunts, a lot of CGI, how were we going to do it? My goal was to make it realistic, make it terrifying, and make Hodor's sacrifice incredibly moving." Most of the exterior shots with the White Walkers and their army took place at Magheramorne, a small hamlet in County Antrim, Northern Ireland near where Castle Black is also filmed. With input from David Benioff and D. B. Weiss, Bender, as well as visual effects supervisor Joe Bauer, also incorporated a transposing of scenes with Wights also crawling on the ceiling and the walls, which Bender hoped would result in the scene being even more "creepy."

In the conclusion of the segment Bender stated, "The big climactic cave sequence was hugely complex, and although it's very scary that this really terrifying thing is happening to our characters, at the end of the day I think the emotion from what we are experiencing is hopefully going to be the shock that people will stay with," referring to Hodor's implied death. In an interview with Kristian Nairn (Hodor), he described filming the scene, "It was a really heavy day — you’ve got these 100-mile-per-hour winds being blown into your face with false snow. I was really holding the door — there were like eight people pushing from the other side and I was really holding them back. It’s definitely Method acting. It was a very intense day but one of the nice things was they let Isaac wrap me. He got to come over and say "Mr. Nairn, that’s a wrap." It was very emotional. It's always been a little group of us together and it felt like our little group was breaking up." Ellie Kendrick (Meera Reed) spoke about the filming of her part of the sequence, saying "A lot of what's happening in that scene, in Meera's head, comes down to adrenaline. There's just no way she can stop and consider logically what's happening. If you have an army of the undead chasing after you, you're only going to be thinking one thing: 'Run!' It was interesting, having the challenge of creating that adrenaline and fear and sadness of Hodor, but not being able to process it at all. Having to recreate that feeling of immediacy, in a stuffy studio at 4 p.m. on a Thursday when you've been filming the same scene for a couple of days, it was difficult. But it was an exciting challenge, to constantly inject the energy those characters must be feeling in that moment."

Top: The Night King with only practical effects and prosthetics. Bottom: Added VFX in post-production, with altered eyes and an icy layer.

Prosthetic designer Barrie Gower was also interviewed for the "Anatomy of a Scene" segment and noted "At any one time during the cave, we had so many characters which were going to be in prosthetics. We had the Night King, three White Walkers, six Children of the Forest including the hero, Leaf, and countless Wights." Gower went on to describe the process involved with creating the Children, "The Children of the Forest are fully covered from head to toe, they're glued completely into these prosthetics all over their body." Kae Alexander, the actress who played Leaf stated that it took between 9 and 10 hours to get the full body prosthetic ready for filming, a process which Bender described as challenging.

In order to create the Night King, according to Barrie Gower, it is primarily practical prosthetic, but also incorporates some VFX to create a more icy look and feel, saying about the eyes, "The effects department alters the eyes in post-production. They give them that blue-glowy hue to them, which we can't really achieve with contact lenses." In regards to the overall prosthetic, "they've added this sort of icy layer over the top of him to create this — it's something incredibly difficult to achieve practically, prosthetics are cast in a translucent rubber, which can only give you so much of that icy quality, so visual effects help augment it a little bit further to give it more dimension." Prior to the sixth season, the Night King was portrayed by Richard Brake, with a head mold of Brake being created in order to accurately mold the prosthetic to his face. In the sixth season he was portrayed by Vladimir Furdik. The White Walker army was first shot in front of a green screen in Magheramorne quarry, and according to a piece in The Hollywood Reporter "A scan was taken from a drone and used as the basis for a CG model of the location, which was augmented with VFX and joined with volcanic hills that were photographed in Iceland." Crowd replication was used to create the 1,000-man army, with special effects supervisor Joe Bauer saying "It's scans of those actors in the makeup and costumes, with variations we used to make a digital army that extends up onto the hills." Bauer also noted that VFX were used to create the weather conditions in the scene, noting "It's wind, mist, fog and heavy atmosphere that you'd get in a marine layer. The dramatic value is to say something's wrong; it's a mystery what they are facing. The temperature drops, and our characters can see their breath. The weather obscures their vision." Spain-based El Ranchito, one of several special effects companies used by Game of Thrones, was responsible for the White Walker army shots.

Pilou Asbæk, who was cast to play Euron Greyjoy, spoke in an interview about the filming of the Kingsmoot saying "We spent two days on the Kingsmoot itself, and then two days on the montage. We shot it chronologically, which helped. The water was freezing cold. We shot the drowning many, many times. I remember looking down the shore, after I had been there for five or six hours, and I saw two smiling faces, in the form of Gemma Whelan and Alfie Allen. They were just smiling their asses off, because they weren't cold! They just had to run to the boat." In regards to stunts, Asbæk continued, "I got a little bit of help, but not much. I think 95 percent of it was me. I like to do all of it when I can, because then I can feel it with the character."

Iain Glen, who has portrayed Jorah Mormont since the beginning of the series, also spoke about his participation in the episode, with his farewell to Daenerys Targaryen, noting "They've got a worried actor on their hands. For any actor on the show, most of the time we're just thinking, "Please keep me alive!" I've been very lucky to be a part of the show, right back to the pilot. If I go out in the madness of greyscale, then I'll have thought I've done very well. It's been a complete treat to be a part of the show. They're a lovely group of people. But the greyscale has definitely got this actor worried, I'll be honest about that."

== Reception ==
=== Ratings ===
"The Door" was viewed by 7.89 million American households on its initial viewing, on May 22, which was slightly more than the previous week's rating of 7.82 million viewers for the episode "Book of the Stranger". The episode also acquired a 4.0 rating in the 18–49 demographic, making it the highest rated show on cable television of the night.

=== Critical reception ===
"The Door" received universal praise from critics, with many citing the emotional revelation involving Hodor, the action scenes with the White Walkers, as well as the Kingsmoot and Daenerys Targaryen's farewell to Jorah Mormont as high points for the episode. It has received a 98% rating on the review aggregator website Rotten Tomatoes from 60 reviews with an average score of 9.08/10. The site's consensus reads "An exquisitely crafted episode, "The Door" culminates in a gut-wrenching revelation that makes the loss of a beloved character all the more poignant."

Matt Fowler of IGN wrote in his review of the episode, ""The Door," directed by Lost's main director, Jack Bender, gave us one of the most emotional deaths on the show to date. Mostly because the scene itself was paired with a big origin-style reveal and a newly opened avenue of time travel mysticism. And it came at the end of a very effective action sequence involving zombies, White Walkers, and the Night King." He gave the episode a 9 out of 10. Emily VanDerWerff of Vox noted, ""The Door", continues last week's trend of feeling as if it's offering up some major, important answers regarding [the show]'s mythos. And many of those revelations impact some of the show's most major characters." Michael Calia of Wall Street Journal wrote in his review of the episode; "The show delivers one of its most heartbreaking, spectacular and mind-blowing episodes."

Jeremy Egner of The New York Times wrote in his review of the episode; "As with many epic sagas, the story and action in “Game of Thrones” are driven largely by characters moving toward and eventually becoming the people they are supposed to be. While we tend to focus on the big-ticket destinies, whether it's Daenerys Targaryen emerging triumphantly from the flames last week or Jon Snow rising from the dead to fight again, the smaller figures have their own slots to fill." James Hunt of What Culture noted, "The Door ... delivered not only the best episode of the season to date, but one that is likely to go down as an all-time favourite." Tim Surette of TV.com wrote in his review, "The Door was BRUTAL in its final minutes, and you're still crying over it, admit it." Lauren O'Callaghan of SFX Magazine wrote in her review, "The Door, was the midseason episode. No way we were getting through that without taking some serious damage to our delicate hope-filled hearts." She gave the episode a 4.5 out of 5.

=== Accolades ===
Year	Award	Category	Nominee(s)	Result	Ref.
2016	Primetime Emmy Awards	Outstanding Directing for a Drama Series	Jack Bender	Nominated	
2016	Primetime Creative Arts Emmy Awards	Outstanding Guest Actor in a Drama Series	Max von Sydow as The Three-Eyed Raven	Nominated	
2016	Primetime Creative Arts Emmy Awards	Outstanding Hairstyling for a Single-Camera Series	Kevin Alexander, Candice Banks, Nicola Mount, Laura Pollock, Gary Machin, Rosalia Culora	Nominated	
2016	Primetime Creative Arts Emmy Awards	Outstanding Prosthetic Makeup for a Series	Jane Walker, Sarah Gower, Emma Sheffield, Tristan Versluis, Barrie Gower	Won	
2016	Primetime Creative Arts Emmy Awards	Outstanding Sound Editing for a Series	Tim Kimmel, Tim Hands, Paul Bercovitch, Paula Fairfield, Bradley C. Katona, Michael Wabro, David Klotz, Brett Voss, Jeffrey Wilhoit, Dylan Tuomy-Wilhoit	Nominated	
2017	Visual Effects Society Awards	Outstanding Effects Simulations in an Episode, Commercial, or Real-Time Project	Eduardo Díaz, Aníbal Del Busto, Angel Rico, Sonsoles López-Aranguren – Land of Always Winter	Nominated	
2017	Hugo Awards	Best Dramatic Presentation, Short Form	David Benioff (writer), D. B. Weiss (writer), and Jack Bender (director)	Nominated	
2017	MTV Movie & TV Awards	Tearjerker	Hodor's (Kristian Nairn) Death	Nominated	

== Leak ==
The episode was accidentally released 24 hours early by HBO Nordic. The episode was eventually taken down, but the pirated copy was released to torrent websites. Reacting to the leak, an official HBO spokesperson said, "This past Sunday's episode was made available early on the HBO Nordic platform temporarily due to a technical issue, at which time it seems to have been copied. Upon learning of the incident, we used the available means to limit further access to the episode."
