= Friends from France =

2013 film

- Film poster
- Directed by: Anne Weil; Philippe Kotlarski
- Written by: Anne Weil; Philippe Kotlarski
- Produced by: Laetitia Gonzalez
- Starring: Soko; Dmitry Brauer
- Cinematography: Frédéric Serve
- Edited by: Mathilde Muyard; Bernard Sasia
- Music by: Robert Marcel Lepage
- Distributed by: Pyramide Distribution
- Release dates: 8 September 2013 (TIFF); 27 November 2013 (France)
- Running time: 100 minutes
- Country: France
- Language: French

Friends from France (French: Les Interdits) is a 2013 French drama film written and directed by Anne Weil and Philippe Kotlarski. It was screened in the Contemporary World Cinema section at the 2013 Toronto International Film Festival. The film is set in Odessa in 1979.

== Cast ==
- Soko as Carole
- Jérémie Lippmann as Jérôme
- Dmitry Brauer as KGB Agent
- Ania Bukstein as Vera
- Alexandre Chacon as David
- Alexander Senderovich as Nathan
