= The Secrets (film) =

2007 film by Avi Nesher

- Directed by: Avi Nesher
- Starring: Ania Bukstein; Michal Shtamler; Fanny Ardant; Adir Miller; Guri Alfi; Alma Zack; Dana Ivgy; Sefi Rivlin; Rivka Michaeli
- Cinematography: Michel Abramowicz
- Distributed by: Monterey Media
- Release date: 14 June 2007 (Israel)
- Country: Israel
- Language: Hebrew

The Secrets (Hebrew: הסודות) is a 2007 Israeli drama film directed by Avi Nesher.

== Plot ==
Noemi is a young devoted Jewish girl who has just lost her mother and who is close to celebrate a marriage imposed by her father. Maybe as a result of the recent loss or maybe because of her interest in the Scriptures, but also because of her lack of feelings towards the future husband (with whom she does not even like to spend time in the same room), the young girl asks her father for the possibility to keep studying the Torah by following a girl's seminary. Arrived at Safed college, she immediately makes friends with the other students except for the rebellious Michelle, who seems to lack any interest in studying. Yet, the seminary students are assigned the task of helping the city's needy people as part of their spiritual formation and Noemi and Michelle are told to work together.

The two of them are sent to take care of old Mrs Anouk, an old lady suffering from cancer and heart problems who, in the past, has betrayed her husband and committed pre-intentional murder. For her, who is close to death, there seems to be no way to escape the harsh divine Judgment, until Noemi and Michelle (who have in the meanwhile become very close friends, to the point of engaging in sexual intercourse) find the right methods to cleanse her from her sins through the holy Scriptures. But as they have broken the same Laws not giving a chance to Mrs Anouk (who in the meanwhile has died of heart attack in a hospital, comforted by the two girls), Noemi and Michelle are both expelled from the school. Concerning sexual intercourse between two women, Noemi convinces Michelle that there is nothing sinful about them as the Torah only forbids homosexual relationships involving two men. At the same time, Michelle is openly courted by a young pharmacist and musician, Yanki, who goes as far as asking her to get married. She agrees, causing Noemi to go mad, as she had previously asked her to live together. A few days later, Yanki shows up at Noemi's new home in order to invite her to the wedding, telling her it would be important for Michelle as she loves her even more than she loves him. As an answer, the girl, enraged by jealousy, throws a jar at him, slightly hurting his cheek, and asks him to leave her alone. The wedding is celebrated, Noemi being there, the wound still visible on the groom's cheek. The two girls make peace and dance together: their love story is over, but their friendship is not.

== Cast ==
- Ania Bukstein as Noemi
- Michal Shtamler as Michelle
- Fanny Ardant as Anouk
- Adir Miller as Yanki
- Guri Alfi as Michael
- Alma Zack as Racheli
- Dana Ivgy as Sigi
- Sefi Rivlin as Rabbi Hess
- Rivka Michaeli as Mrs. Meizlish

== Reception ==
The film was reviewed by Stephen Holden for The New York Times. In Holden's view, "the movie becomes an intriguing, occasionally discordant hybrid of austere Israeli and voluptuous French filmmaking traditions." He concluded "As “The Secrets” softens its focus, moving away from cultural barriers and becoming a star-crossed love story in which Michelle is torn between Naomi and a kind-hearted klezmer clarinetist (Adir Miller), it risks becoming mawkish. But the passionate performances of Ms. Bukstein, Ms. Shtamler and Ms. Ardant lend “The Secrets” enough emotional solidity to prevent it from entirely dissolving in the suds."

It was nominated for Outstanding Film – Limited Release at the 21st GLAAD Media Awards. The movie was featured on Autostraddle as one of "8 Pretty Great Lesbian Movies You Haven't Seen Yet."

== See also ==
- Eyes Wide Open
- Red Cow
- Disobedience
