= Yuval Zamir =

Israeli actor (1963–2011)

- יובל זמיר
- Born: 15 July 1963; Givatayim, Israel
- Died: 21 December 2011 (aged 48); Tel Aviv, Israel
- Occupations: Actor; voice artist; singer; director; writer; acting coach
- Years active: 1987–1999; 2005–2011
- Spouse: Carmel Ne'eman (m. 1992; div. 2003)
- Children: 3

Yuval Zamir (Hebrew: יובל זמיר; 15 July 1963 – 21 December 2011) was an Israeli actor, voice actor, singer, writer and theatre director.

== Biography ==
Born in Givatayim to a shoemaker and a housewife, Zamir began acting in children's plays at age 11 and then studied at Thelma Yellin High School. He then joined the choir at the IDF as a soloist. Before beginning his career, Zamir took vocal pedagogy classes under the guidance of Netania Davrath and later went to study further acting at Nissan Nativ Acting Studio.

In 1987, Zamir took part in a number of plays at the Habima Theatre and the Cameri Theatre. These include stage adaptations of King Lear, Pied Piper of Hamelin and A Midsummer Night's Dream. His success on stage had led him to star in Off-Broadway productions and he even directed plays of his own. On screen, Zamir appeared in several films, including the 1982 film Noa at 17.

Zamir found his greatest fame as a voice actor mainly during the 1990s. He was internationally known as the original Hebrew voice of the title character in the Winnie the Pooh franchise. Other Hebrew dubbing roles Zamir performed included the Beast in Beauty and the Beast, John Smith's singing voice in Pocahontas, Hopper in A Bug's Life, Tweedledum and Tweedledee in Alice in Wonderland, Gus in Cinderella, Alan-a-Dale in Robin Hood, Henk in Alfred J. Kwak, Jethro in The Prince of Egypt and more.

Zamir was also a talented singer, particularly in the field of opera. He was one of the few performers who worked on Yoni Rechter’s compilation of songs which were produced into an album. He has also sung in a number of stage and screen performances and has also provided the singing voices of some of the animated characters he dubbed.

=== Personal life ===
In 1992, Zamir married Carmel Ne'eman, who is the daughter of composer Amitai Ne'eman and the sister of singer Adi Ne'eman. They had two sons and a daughter.

In November 1999, Zamir was convicted of sexual and indecent assault towards male students while he was serving as a drama teacher at the Ironi High School. He was sentenced to four years in prison. At that point in time, the Hebrew voice of Winnie the Pooh was passed on to Saar Badishi. In 2003, Zamir was released on a period of rehabilitation and also came out as a gay man and after eleven years of marriage, Zamir and Ne'eman divorced when the former announced his sexuality. He then returned to acting and directing on stage in 2005.

== Death ==
On 21 December 2011, Zamir died after suffering from complications from diabetes mellitus at the age of 48 and was laid to rest at Kiryat Shaul Cemetery in Tel Aviv.
