= Saar Badishi =

Israeli musical artist

Saar Badishi סער בדישי
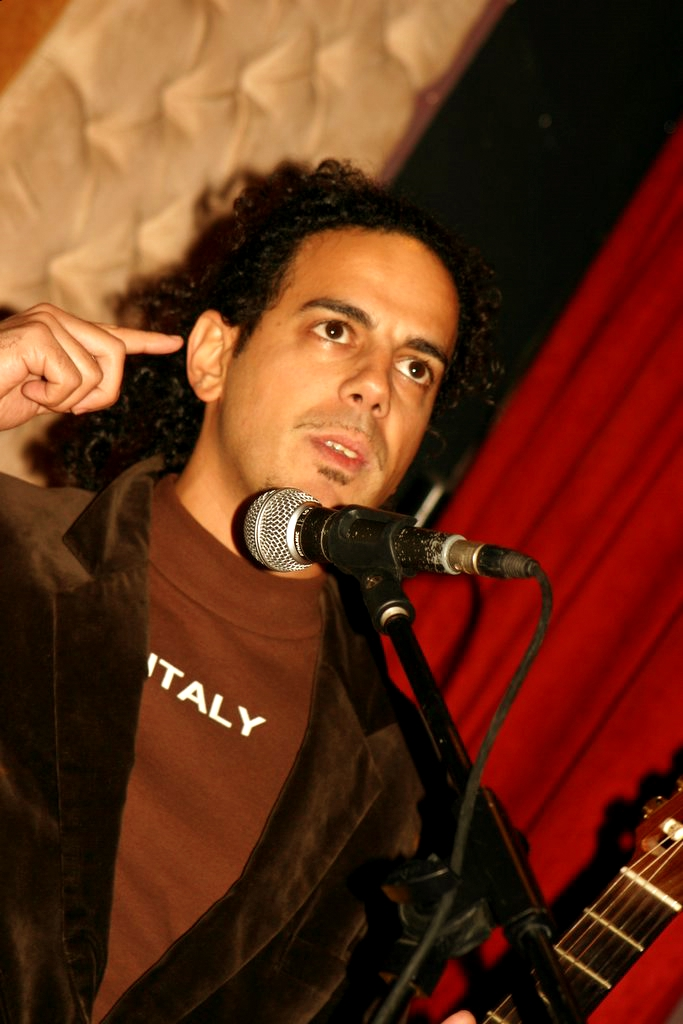
- Badishi in 2005

Background information
- Born: 2 May 1971 (age 55); Rehovot, Israel
- Genres: Pop; rock
- Occupations: Singer; actor; voice artist
- Instrument: Vocals
- Years active: 1993–present

Saar Badishi (Hebrew: סער בדישי; born 2 May 1971) is an Israeli singer, actor and voice actor.

== Biography ==
Born in Rehovot to Yemenite-Jewish family.

Badishi started out in a musical organisation within the Northern Command. After being discharged, he founded a musical ensemble which performed cover songs in nightclubs. He later signed with the record company Hed Arzi Music and he released his debut album in 1994. In 2006, Badishi moved to England and lived there for four years after Jacko Eisenberg performed a cover version of one of his songs on Kokhav Nolad. This rekindled his interest in music.

As an actor, Badishi first appeared on the teen drama series A Matter of Time between the second and fourth seasons and the musical telenovela Our Song. He also made his most prominent film appearance in the 1996 film Forever Young.

Badishi is also a voice actor. In 1999, he took over as the voice of the title character of the Winnie the Pooh franchise following the imprisonment of Yuval Zamir. He also provided the voices of Theo Turbo, Tito Lopez and Angelo Lopez in Turbo, Ronin in Epic, Edsy in Get Squirrely and Hyena Cook, Tiger and Bee Commander in Delhi Safari, Raphael in Teenage Mutant Ninja Turtles, Sheen Estevez in Planet Sheen, Bugs Bunny in The Looney Tunes Show, Dave in Scaredy Squirrel, Maxum Man in Sidekick, Warren in Atomic Puppet, Colonel Cork in 3 Amigonauts, Brick in Total Drama: Revenge of the Island, Sawyer in Camp Lakebottom, Alejandro in Total Drama: All-Stars, Max in Total Drama: Pahkitew Island, Gerry, Rock and Spud in Total Drama Presents: The Ridonculous Race, Taylor in Freaktown, One-Eye and Hairfang in Fangbone!, Sgt. Sasha Spritz in Winston Steinburger and Sir Dudley Ding Dong, Billy Joe Cobra in Dude, That's My Ghost!, Rolling with the Ronks! and Tantor in Tarzan & Jane

=== Personal life ===
Badishi is the older brother of stand-up comedian Shaully Badishi and the nephew of singer Sarah Badishi.
