= Temporarily Dead =

Israeli television series

Temporarily Dead (Hebrew: מתים לרגע, romanized: Metim LeRega, literally "Dead for a Moment") is an Israeli speculative fiction medical drama TV series.

it was premiered on July 17, 2014, on the HOT3 channel. The series was created by Gal Zaid and Roni Yaddor, who also served as the writer and director alongside Yoav and Doron Paz.

It ran for two seasons: in 2014 (July–September) and in 2017 (June–August).

In 2016, it was released in the Netherlands under the title Project Orpheus. In 2025, Amazon announced it was writing drama Orpheus Project based on the Israeli series.

It was compared with the American series Grey's Anatomy.

== Plot ==
A group of medical interns find out about experiments on clinical death and coming back to life conducted by professor Landau ("Orpheus Project"). They decide to run the experiment themselves. They have problems, but also acquire superpowers.

== See also ==
- Project Morpheus
