= Shlomi Koriat =

Israeli actor and comedian (born 1976)

- שלומי קוריאט
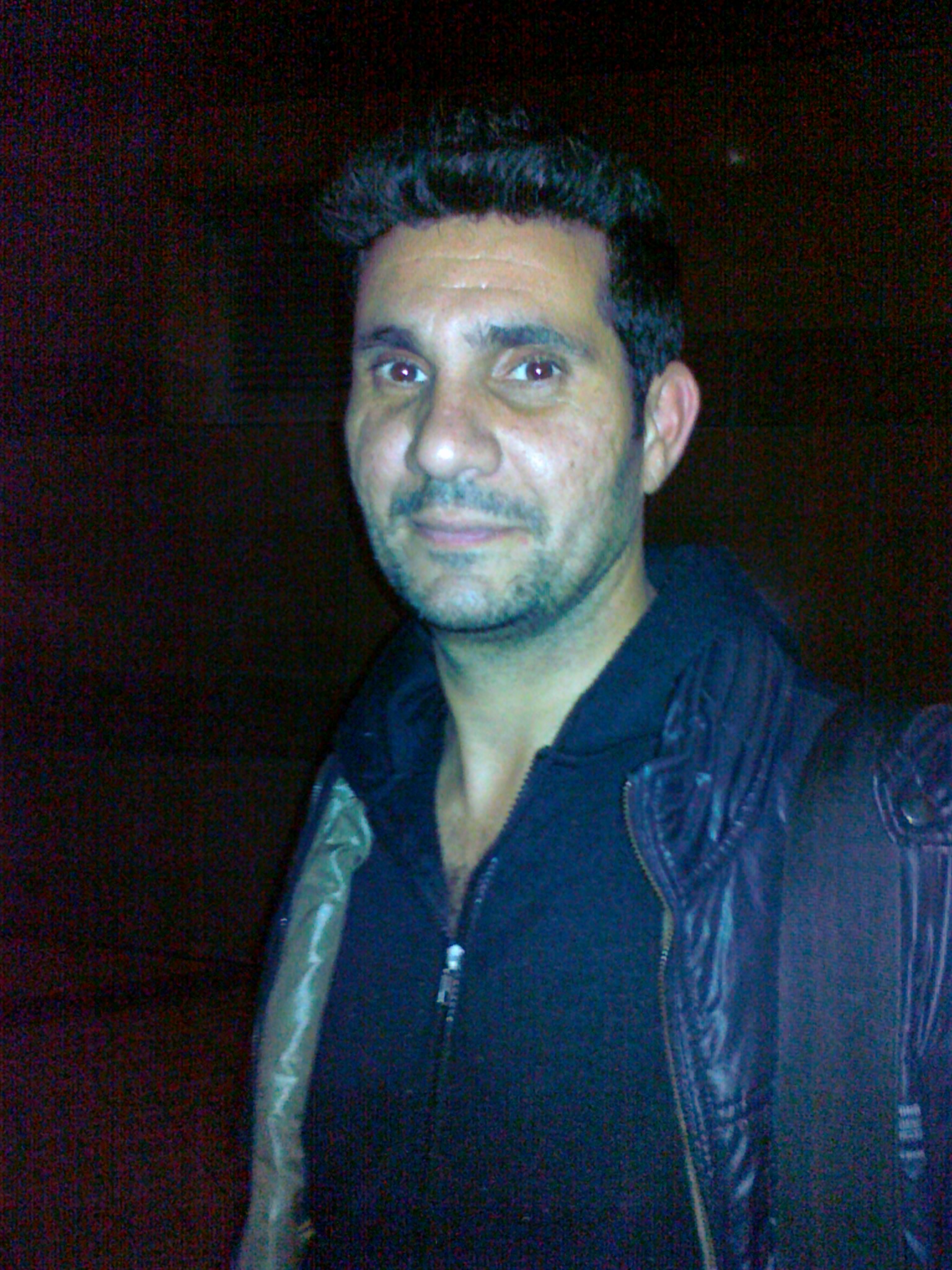
- Born: September 24, 1976 (age 49); Yavne, Israel
- Occupations: Actor, comedian

Shlomi Koriat (Hebrew: שלומי קוריאט; born 24 September 1976) is an Israeli actor and comedian.

== Early life ==
Koriat was born in Yavne. He specialized in theater and arts while attending "Thelma Yellin" Givatayim. After his military service in the Israel Defense Forces, he studied acting and theater acting at "Beit Zvi.

== Career ==
He worked with two comedians Yuval Semo and Ofir Lobel as the "Prozac Trio", earning them a local TV show.

He then appeared in television drama series and theater. In 2007, he began acting on the drama series The Arbitrator. In 2008 participated in the television series, Dolls.

In 2008–2009, he played on TV series including "Strip", and the third season of the satirical program, Week-end.

In 2010, he appeared on the morning program "Summer" alongside Orna Datz and appeared in a guest role on the sixth season of HaPijamot.

In 2011, Koriat guest-starred in an episode of Naor's Friends and on comedy series Most Beautiful Years.

In 2012, he acted in Little Simico's Big Fantasy, a comedy film directed by Eric Lubeckiego, alongside Zion Baruch, Neta Garty, and Uri Gavriel. He played the role of Nissim in The World Is Funny.
