= Naor Zion =

Israeli comedian, actor, writer and director (born 1973)

- נאור ציון
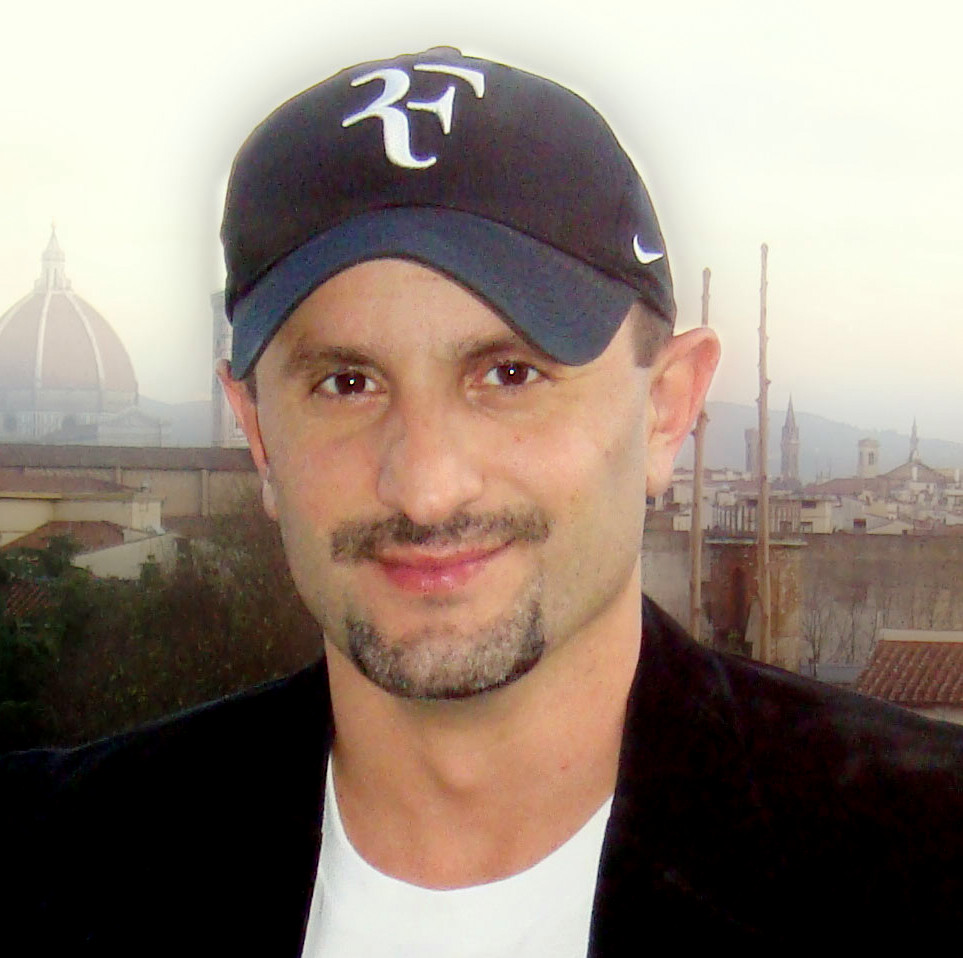
- Born: February 10, 1972 (age 54); Ramat HaSharon, Israel
- Occupations: Comedian, actor, writer and director
- Years active: 1993–Present
- Website: www.naorzion.co.il

Naor Zion (Hebrew: נאור ציון, Hebrew pronunciation: [naˈʔoʁ t͡siˈjon]; born February 10, 1973) is an Israeli comedian, actor, writer and director. Zion was the creator, head writer and an actor for the Israeli sitcom television series "Naor's Friends".

== Career ==
Naor Zion was born in Ramat Hasharon, Israel. Stood out at an early age in his acting abilities and was a very good basketball player, he played for a short time in the Israeli under 16 national team and he also played until the 12th grade in A.S Ramat Hasharon basketball team. In 1993, after his army service, he appeared in a stand-up talent show on the entertainment show of Dudu Topaz broadcast on Channel 1. In 1994, Zion participated in a humor show called "Naflu Al HaRosh" ("fell on their heads") on Israeli Channel 2. He also appeared around the country in a one-man show which combined stand-up, sketches and interaction with the audience. The show featured funny observations of typical Israeli situations, comments on the social-political situation, relationships and more. Over the years Zion developed a popular skit during his show in which he would dub a couple of segments from the series "Pinocchio" (which was a popular 1980s children cartoon in Israel) in a satirical form. His show ran successfully throughout seven years.

In 2001, Zion presented a new stand-up show which combined video segments which were broadcast during the show on a wide stage screen.

In 2005, Zion released a DVD with highlights from his stand-up show.

In 2006, Zion wrote, directed and starred in the Israeli sitcom "Naor's Friends". The show aired between 2006 and 2011 for 3 seasons. The show set rating records for a scripted show for channel 10, and it is considered as the most successful script show in the history of the channel. In 2017 the show came back for a fourth season.

In 2014, Zion wrote, created and directed the Israeli sitcom "Amamiyot".

In 2015, Zion wrote, created and directed the Israeli lifestyle show "Eat and Run".

In 2017, Zion wrote, directed and starred in the 13 episodes fourth season "Naor's Friends".

In 2018, the production rights of the "Amamiyot" sold to the Indian broadcast company, applause entertainment who filmed 12 for the first season of the show with a total production cost of 12 million dollars. The show is scheduled to premiere in India during 2019.

In 2019, Zion started in a legal process against "Keshet Media Group" and the production of the television show "2025". In a video that he uploaded to the web, Zion presented recurring motives copied from a reality television format called "How much can you make?" that he presented to a top executive in Keshet about a year and a half before the show premiered.

During 2020, Naor opened his own new YouTube channel where he uploaded new and original content from comedy videos, stand-up clips and clips of cooking and sports, as some of the videos (the Harira brothers) became network hits.

== Personal life ==
Naor Zion was born to Persian Jewish parents. He grew up in Ramat HaSharon, Israel. His father died when he was ten.

In December 2003, an Indictment was filed against Zion for an attempted attack and malicious damage to property after Zion threw a garbage can and a plastic chair at a waitress in a restaurant, after she served him food which wasn't to his satisfaction. Eventually the Magistrate's court in Tel Aviv approved a plea bargain between Zion and the State Attorney's Office, according to which he would serve 120 hours of community service and would pay the waitress 3,000 shekels.

In 2003, Zion also attacked a press photographer and threatened to hit him if he dared to take pictures of him. In 2018 he attacked a man in Ramat Aviv Mall, claiming that it was done in self-defense.
