= Tal Mosseri =

Israeli actor

- טל מוסרי
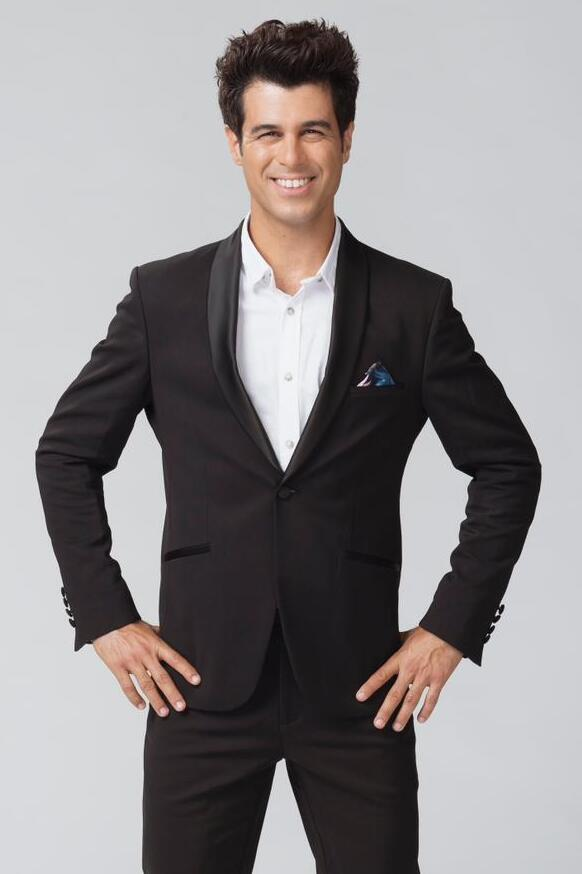
- Mosseri in 2020
- Born: 30 August 1975 (age 49); Tel Aviv, Israel
- Occupations: Actor; singer; television presenter
- Years active: 1993–present
- Spouse: Noam Ben-Gurion (m. 2005)
- Children: 3
- Relatives: Ido Mosseri (brother)

Tal Mosseri (Hebrew: טל מוסרי; born 30 August 1975) is an Israeli actor, singer and television presenter.

== Biography ==
Mosseri was born in Tel Aviv, Israel, to a Jewish family, to a father of Sephardi-Mizrahi origin (Egyptian-Jewish) and a mother of Ashkenazi origin. He attended Thelma Yellin High School and studied acting at Tel Aviv Arts School. Before serving in the Israel Defense Forces, Mosseri was a member of a music band called Tzeirei Tel Aviv (Youth of Tel Aviv).

In September 2005, Mosseri married Noam Ben-Gurion (granddaughter of David Ben-Gurion's nephew). They have two sons and a daughter.

Mosseri is the older brother of actor and voice dubber Ido Mosseri.

== Television career ==
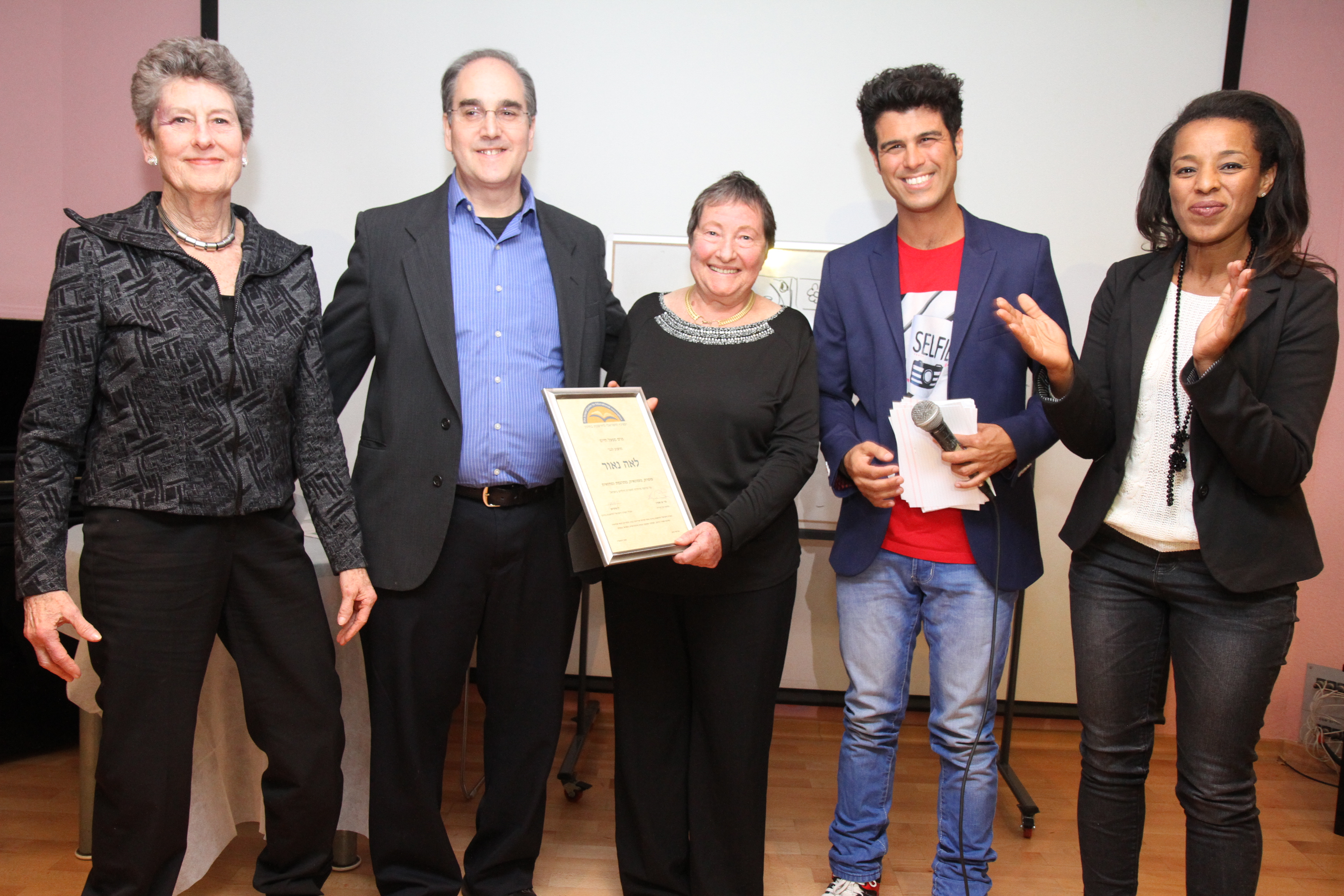

Mosseri joined Arutz HaYeladim (The Kids' Channel) as a presenter in 1997. He left the channel in 2015 after 18 years, holding the record for the longest tenure of any presenter in the channel's history.

== Stage and screen performances ==
=== Theatre ===
- An Inspector Calls (with Cameri Theatre)
- Hansel and Gretel (Hansel) (with Tzipi Maizler Productions)

=== Film ===
- The Sixteenth Sheep (1999)
- Magic Hat (2000)

=== Television ===
- Hakita Hameofefet
- Spyders

== See also ==
- Television in Israel
