= The Arbitrator (Israeli TV series) =

- Also known as: The Arbatrator Ha-Borer
- Genre: Crime drama Black comedy
- Created by: Reshef Levi and Shay Kanot
- Written by: Reshef Levi
- Directed by: Shay Kanot
- Country of origin: Israel
- Original language: Hebrew

Original release
- Network: Hot Channel 3
- Release: March 26, 2007 – January 1, 2014

The Arbitrator (2007) (Hebrew: הבורר, Ha-Borer) is an Israeli crime drama series. It tells the story of Nadav Feldman, a social worker who discovers that he was adopted and his real father is the head of a crime family.

== Plot ==
The series tells the story of Nadav Feldman, a young social worker, who discovers that he is adopted and finds himself in the depths of his biological father's family, Baruch Asulin, a leader of an organized crime syndicate in Israel known as "Ha-Borer" (The Arbitrator), due to his activities as an arbitrator in disputes in the underworld.

This series focuses on the combination of dramatic stretches, the conflict between the norms of society including crime, especially norms and codes of conduct of the underworld. Among other highlights of the series, in a satirical way, the contrast between certain behaviors of some of the heroes of the series (as a demonstration of piety) and other behaviors (such as the blatant disregard for human life).

== Characters ==
- Baruch "The Arbitrator" Asulin (Moshe Ivgy) - the head of a crime family.
- Nadav Feldman (Yehuda Levi) - a social worker who finds out that Baruch is his biological father.
- Avi "The Spleen" Asulin (Shlomi Koriat) - Baruch's trigger happy son, who serves as the series' comic relief.
- Yigal "The Nazi" Mizrahi (Uri Gavriel) - Baruch's nemesis and formerly best friend.
- Amram "Bulldog" Hashbian (Yossef Abu Varda) - Baruch's friend and personal bodyguard.
- Gila Asulin (Hanna Azoulay-Hasfari) - Baruch's wife.
- Naomi "Spoon" Asulin (Lirit Balaban) - Baruch's baalat teshuva daughter, who also serves as a comic relief.
- Orna Kliman (Maya Maron) - Nadav's girlfriend at the start of the series.
- Pavel and Nikola Kovlova (Michael Rozhetzky and Shalom Michaelshvili) - two henchmen who initially work for Baruch.
- Irena Kovlova (Ania Bukstein) - Pavel and Nikola's sister, who gets romantically involved with Nadav.
- Inbal Asulin (Adi Gilat) - Avi's Wife.
- Limor "Kuki" Goldman (Neta Garti) - Avi's mistress.
- Ron "The Persian" Hashbian (Tzion Baruch) - one of Baruch's henchmen.
- Menachem Madmoni (Uri Klausner) - a detective in charge of investigating Baruch's clan.
- Yossi Asulin (Shaul Mizrahi) - Baruch's brother and former partner in heading the family, cast away after becoming a drug addict and longing to return to his former glory.
- Oshrit Asulin (Dana Ivgy) - Yossi's daughter. (In real life, Dana is Moshe Ivgy's daughter.)
- Amos Faruki (Yaakov Cohen) - a veteran associate of Baruch, Yossi and Yigal.
- Itzik Sasa (Dror Geva) - Naomi's suitor and later husband.
- Shimi Angel (Igal Adika) - an acquaintance of the Asulin family, who has ambitions to become a contract killer.
- Idan Romi (Aviv Alush) - one of Baruch's henchmen.
- Nir (Yon Tumarkin) - sniper elite unit.

== See also ==
- The Arbitrator (Vietnamese TV series)
