= Naor's Friends =

Israeli television series

- Hebrew: החברים של נאור
- Genre: Sitcom
- Created by: Naor Zion
- Starring: Naor Zion; Benny Avni; Yuval Semo; Yoni Zicholtz; Tamar Keinan (series 1–2); Mali Levi (series 3)
- Opening theme: "לא נרדמת תל אביב" (Translated: "Tel Aviv Never Sleeps") by Adi Cohen
- Country of origin: Israel
- Original language: Hebrew
- No. of seasons: 4
- No. of episodes: 54

Production
- Running time: 22 minutes

Original release
- Network: Channel 10
- Release: November 14, 2006 – June 22, 2017

Naor's Friends (Hebrew: החברים של נאור, romanized: HaKhaverim Shel Naor, lit. 'Naor's Friends') is an Israeli television sitcom created by Naor Zion for the Israeli Channel 10. The series premiered on November 14, 2006, and series 3 started airing on April 5, 2011. The Israeli comedian Naor Zion completely wrote and directed the series and also stars in the series as a fictionalized version of himself. The series which is set in Tel Aviv revolves around Naor's eccentric friends and acquaintances, including Weisman, Dedi, Mika and Omri

The series focuses on four single friends in their thirties, who live in the center of Tel Aviv - Naor (played by Naor Zion), Weisman (played by Benny Avni), Dedi (played by Yuval Semo), Mika (played by Tamar Keinan), Omri (played by Yoni Zicholtz). Dafi (played by Mali Levi) is introduced in the third series as the closest female friend to the main male cast after Tamar Keinan quit her role as Mika.

On 13 July 2016, some 5 years since its last original episode, creator and star Naor Zion announced the series will be returning for a 4th season on Channel 10. It would also be the first season without Ronit Ivgy, who died earlier that same year. The fourth season began filming in August 2016.

The opening theme song of the series, "לא נרדמת תל אביב" (Translated: "Tel Aviv Never Sleeps") was written, composed (and original sung by) Danny Robas, and is performed in the series by Adi Cohen (who won third place on Kokhav Nolad season 2).

== Cast ==
=== Main characters ===
- Naor Zion (playing himself) - the main character of the series who works as a stand-up comedian.
- Daniel Weissmann (Played by Benny Avni) - Naor's best friend.
- Dedi Har'el (played by Yuval Semo): Naor's friend. Dedi is a pilot in the Israeli Air Force who became a pilot for the purpose of impressing women.
- Mika (played by Tamar Keinan) - a childhood friend of Naor with whom Naor and his friends consult about women, yet never listen to her advice. She is Tamir's girlfriend. Tamar Keinan quit her role as Mika before the third series.
- Omri (played by Yoni Zicholtz) - Naor's friend. Omri is a private eye.
- Dafi (played by Mali Levi) - Naor's friend who is introduced in the third series.

=== Recurring characters ===
There are numerous recurring characters in The Friends of Naor. The most prominent are:

- Hanna Zion (played by Ronit Ivgy) - Naor's overbearing mother. She is often described as stingy.
- Tamir Landau (played by Aaron Silberberg) - Mika's surreal dwarf boyfriend.
- Pluto (played by David Kigler) - an eccentric fan of Naor.
- Avi Dalal (playing himself) - the owner of a well known pizzeria in Tel Aviv which is the permanent venue of the main characters. Dalal is the mentor of the group.
