= Rehovot =

City in Israel

Rehovot רחובות
- City

Hebrew transcription(s)
  - ISO 259: Rḥovot
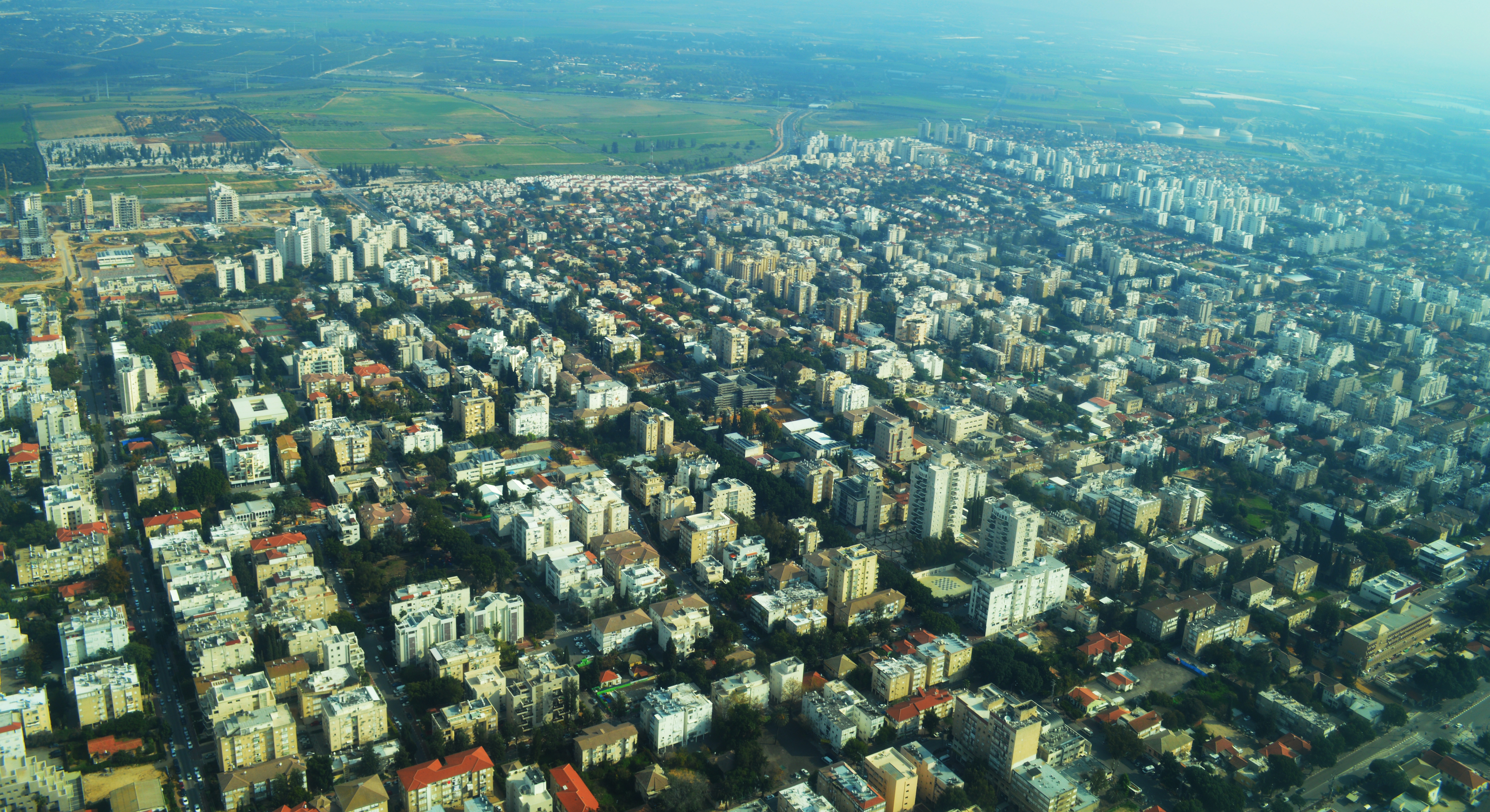
- View of Rehovot

- Coat of arms
- Nickname: 'The city of science and culture'
- Location within Central Israel Location within Israel
- Coordinates: 31°53′49″N 34°49′00″E
- Country: Israel
- District: Central
- Subdistrict: Rehovot
- Natural Region: Rehovot
- Founded: 1890; 136 years ago

Government
  - Type: Mayor–council
  - Body: Municipality of Rehovot
  - Mayor: Matan Dil

Area
  - Total: 23,041 dunams (23.041 km^{2}; 8.896 sq mi)

Population (2024)
  - Total: 155,049
  - Density: 6,729.3/km^{2} (17,429/sq mi)

Ethnicity
  - Jews and others: 99.7%
  - Arabs: 0.3%
- Time zone: UTC+2 (IST)
  - Summer (DST): UTC+3 (IDT)
- Name meaning: Broad Places
- Website: rehovot.muni.il

Rehovot (Hebrew: רחובות, romanized: Reḥōvōt, pronounced [ʁeχoˈvot] / [ʁeˈχovot]) is a city in the Central District of Israel, about 20 kilometers (12 miles) south of Tel Aviv. In 2024 it had a population of 155,049.

== Etymology ==
Israel Belkind, founder of the Bilu movement, proposed the name "Rehovot" (lit. 'wide expanses') based on Genesis 26:22: "And he called the name of it Rehoboth; and he said: 'For now the Lord hath made room for us, and we shall be fruitful in the land'." This Bible verse is also inscribed in the city's logo. The biblical town of Rehoboth was located in the Negev Desert.

== History ==
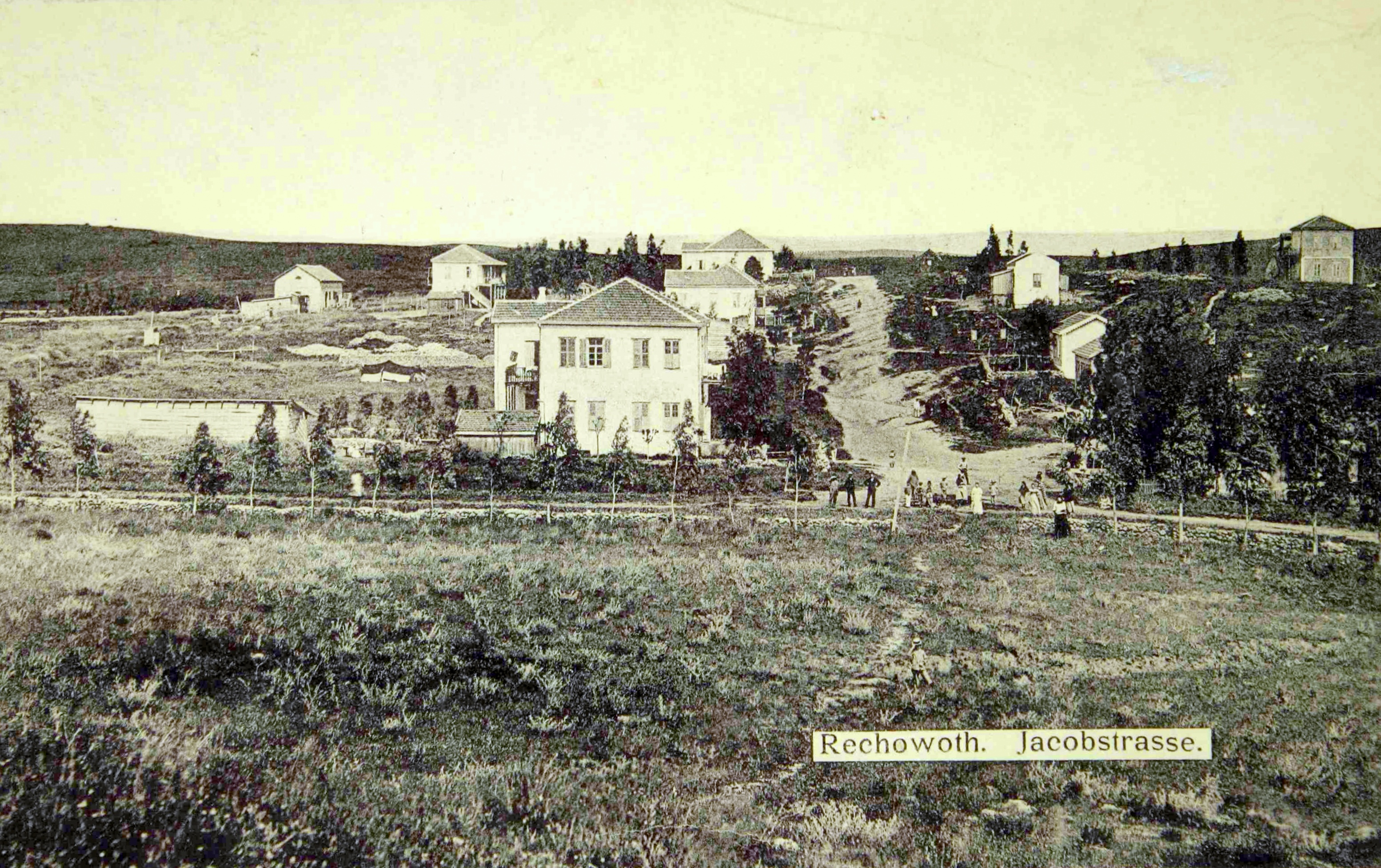
Yaakov Street, Rehovot in 1893

Rehovot was established in 1890 by pioneers of the First Aliyah on the coastal plain near a site called Khirbat Deiran, an "abandoned or sparsely populated" estate, which now lies in the center of the built-up area of the city. According to Marom, Deiran offered "a convenient launching pad for early land purchase initiatives which shaped the pattern of Jewish settlement until the beginning of the British Mandate".

Rehovot was founded as a moshava in 1890 by Polish Jewish immigrants who had come with the First Aliyah, seeking to establish a township which would not be under the influence of the Baron Edmond James de Rothschild, on land which was purchased from a Christian Arab by the Menuha Venahala society, an organization in Warsaw that raised funds for Jewish settlement in Eretz Israel.

In March 1892, a dispute over pasture rights erupted between the residents of Rehovot and the neighboring village of Zarnuqa, which took two years to resolve. Another dispute broke out with the Suteriya Bedouin tribe, which had been cultivating some of the land as tenant farmers. According to Moshe Smilansky, one of the early settlers of Rehovot, the Bedouins had received compensation for the land, but refused to vacate it. In 1893, they attacked the moshava. Through the intervention of a respected Arab sheikh, a compromise was reached, with the Bedouins receiving an additional sum of money, which they used to dig a well.

In 1890, the region was an uncultivated wasteland with no trees, houses or water. The moshava's houses were initially built along two parallel streets: Yaakov Street and Benjamin Street, before later expanding, and vineyards, almond orchards and citrus groves were planted, but the inhabitants grappled with agricultural failures, plant diseases, and marketing problems.

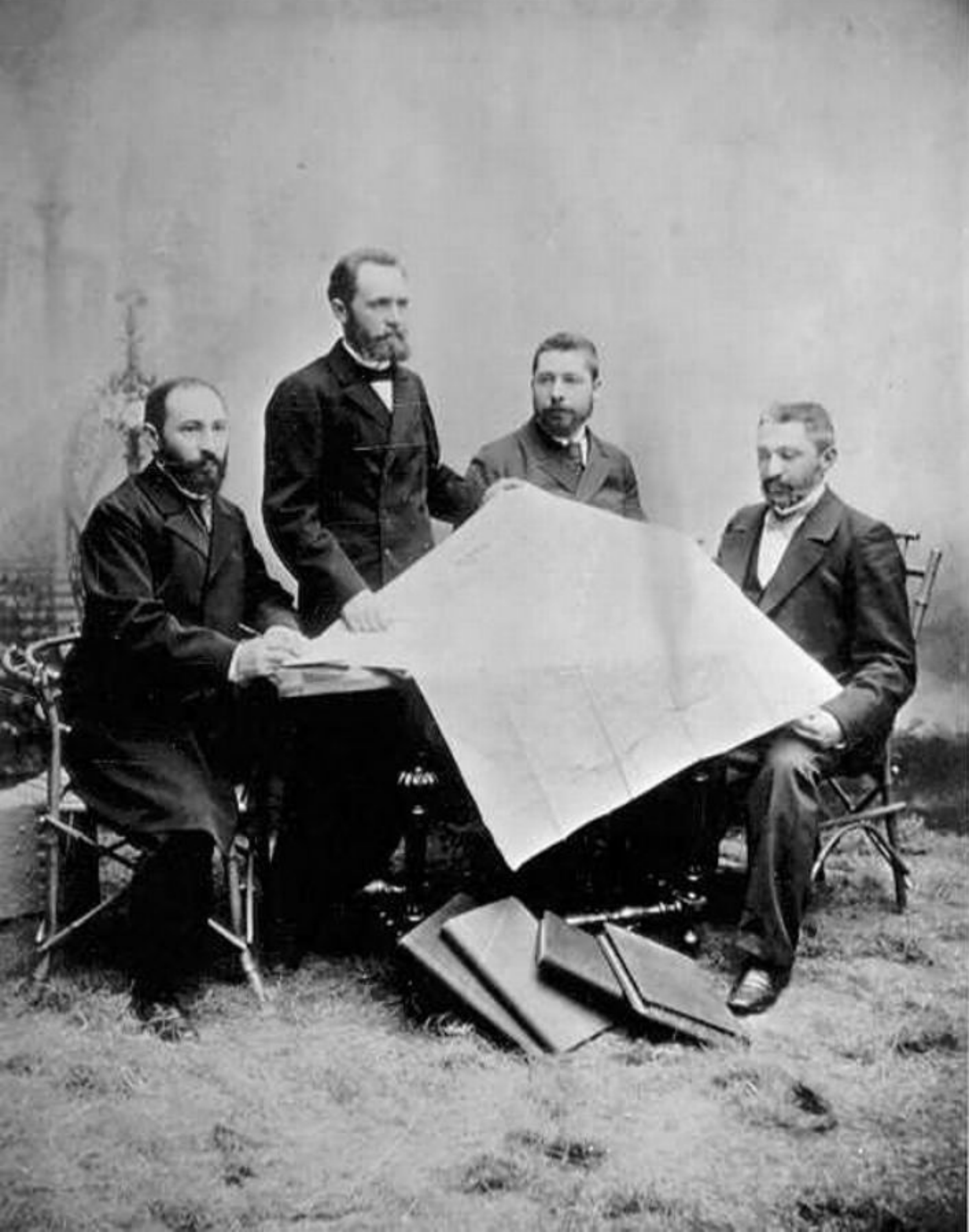
Menucha and Nahala, the Warsaw committee that founded the city, Eliezer Kaplan on left in 1892

The first citrus grove was planted by Zalman Minkov in 1904. Minkov's grove, surrounded by a wall, included a guard house, stables, a packing plant, and an irrigation system in which groundwater was pumped from a large well in the inner courtyard. The well was 23 meters deep, the height of an eight-story building, and over six meters in diameter. The water was channeled via an aqueduct to an irrigation pool, and from there to a network of ditches dug around the bases of the trees.

The Great Synagogue of Rehovot was established in 1903, during the First Aliyah period.

In 1908, the Workman's Union (Hapoel Hazair) organized a group of 300 Yemenite immigrants then living in the region of Jerusalem and Jaffa, bringing them to work as farmers in the colonies of Rishon-le-Zion and Rehovot. Only a few dozen Yemenite families had settled in Rehovot by 1908. They built houses for themselves in a plot given to them at the south end of the town, which became known as Sha'araim. In 1910, Shmuel Warshawsky, with the secret support of the JNF, was sent to Yemen to recruit more agricultural laborers. Hundreds arrived starting in 1911 and were housed first in a compound one kilometre south of Rehovot and then in a large extension of the Sha'araim quarter.

The second Zarnuqa incident, that took place in July 1913 between the colonists and guards of Rehovot, and the Arab rural population, is considered by historians as a milestone in Zionist–Arab relations in late Ottoman Palestine. The incident, which started over simple accusation of theft of grapes from a Jewish-owned vineyard, became much more than a local incident, left one Arab and two Jews dead and resulted in tremendous hostility between the two sides. There are various narratives available to researchers today, including Jewish, Arabic sources and external sources. It is difficult to determine whose narrative is closer to historical reality, or to find out who started the fight and who is to be blamed. This incident illustrates the difficult task facing historians in analyzing the late Ottoman Palestine, the period of the early Zionist–Arab encounter and conflict. It is alleged that this was the moment when a previously peaceful co-existence among Jews and Arabs, united under the Ottoman Empire, instantly became an "us vs. them" divisiveness that has prevailed ever since.

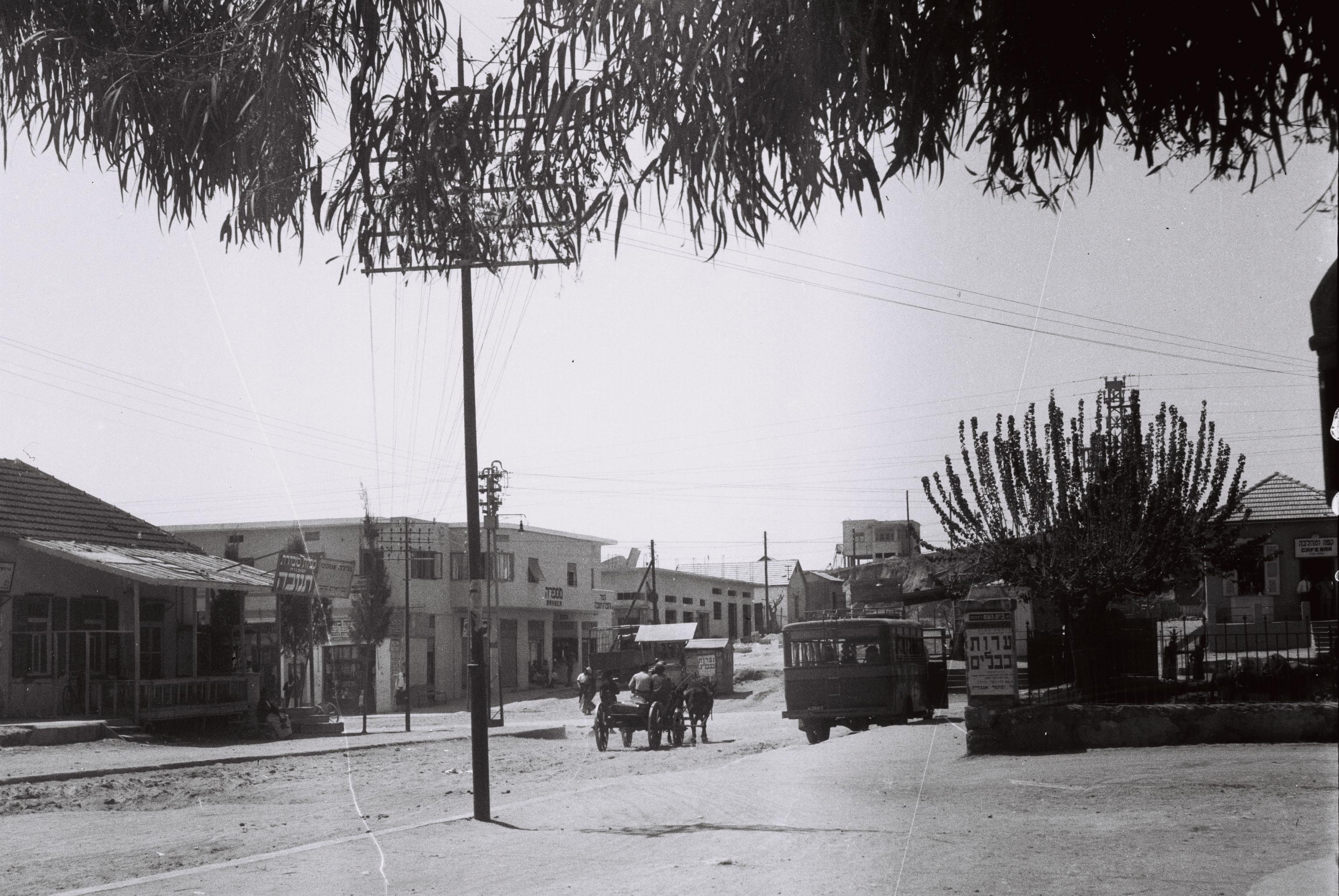
Main street of Rehovot in 1933

In February 1914, Rothschild visited Rehovot during the fourth of his five visits to the Land of Israel. That year, Rehovot had a population of around 955.

During the 1915 Ottoman Syria locust infestation, four locust waves struck Rehovot.

=== British Mandate ===
In 1920, the Rehovot Railway Station was opened, which greatly boosted the local citrus fruit industry. A few packing houses were built near the station to enable the fruit to be sent by railway to the rest of the country and to the port of Jaffa for export to Europe. According to a census conducted in 1922 by the British Mandate authorities, Rehovot had a population of 1,242 inhabitants, consisting of 1,241 Jews and 1 Muslim, increasing in 1931 census to 3,193 inhabitants, in 833 houses. In 1924, the British Army contracted the Palestine Electric Company for wired electric power. The contract allowed the Electric Company to extend the grid beyond the original geographical limits that had been projected by the concession it was given. The high-voltage line that exceeded the limits of the original concession ran along some major towns and agricultural settlements, offering extended connections to the Jewish towns of Rishon Le-Zion, Ness Ziona and Rehovot (in spite of their proximity to the high-voltage line, the Arab towns of Ramla and Lod remained unconnected).

In 1931, the first workers moshav, Kfar Marmorek, was built on lands which were acquired from the village of Zarnuqa by the Jewish National Fund in 1926, and ten Yemenite Jewish families which were evicted from Kinneret were resettled there. Later, they were joined by thirty-five other families from Sha'araim. Today, they are both suburbs of Rehovot.

The agricultural research station that opened in Rehovot in 1932 later became the Department of Agriculture of the Hebrew University of Jerusalem. In 1933, a juice factory was built. In 1934, Chaim Weizmann established the Sieff Institute, which later became the Weizmann Institute of Science. In 1937, Weizmann built his home on the land purchased adjacent to the Sieff Institute. The house later served as the presidential residence after Weizmann became president in 1948. Weizmann and his wife are buried on the grounds of the institute.

In 1945, Rehovot had a population of 10,020, and in 1948, it had grown to 12,500. The suburb of Rehovot, Kefar Marmorek, had a population of 500 Jews in 1948.

=== State of Israel ===
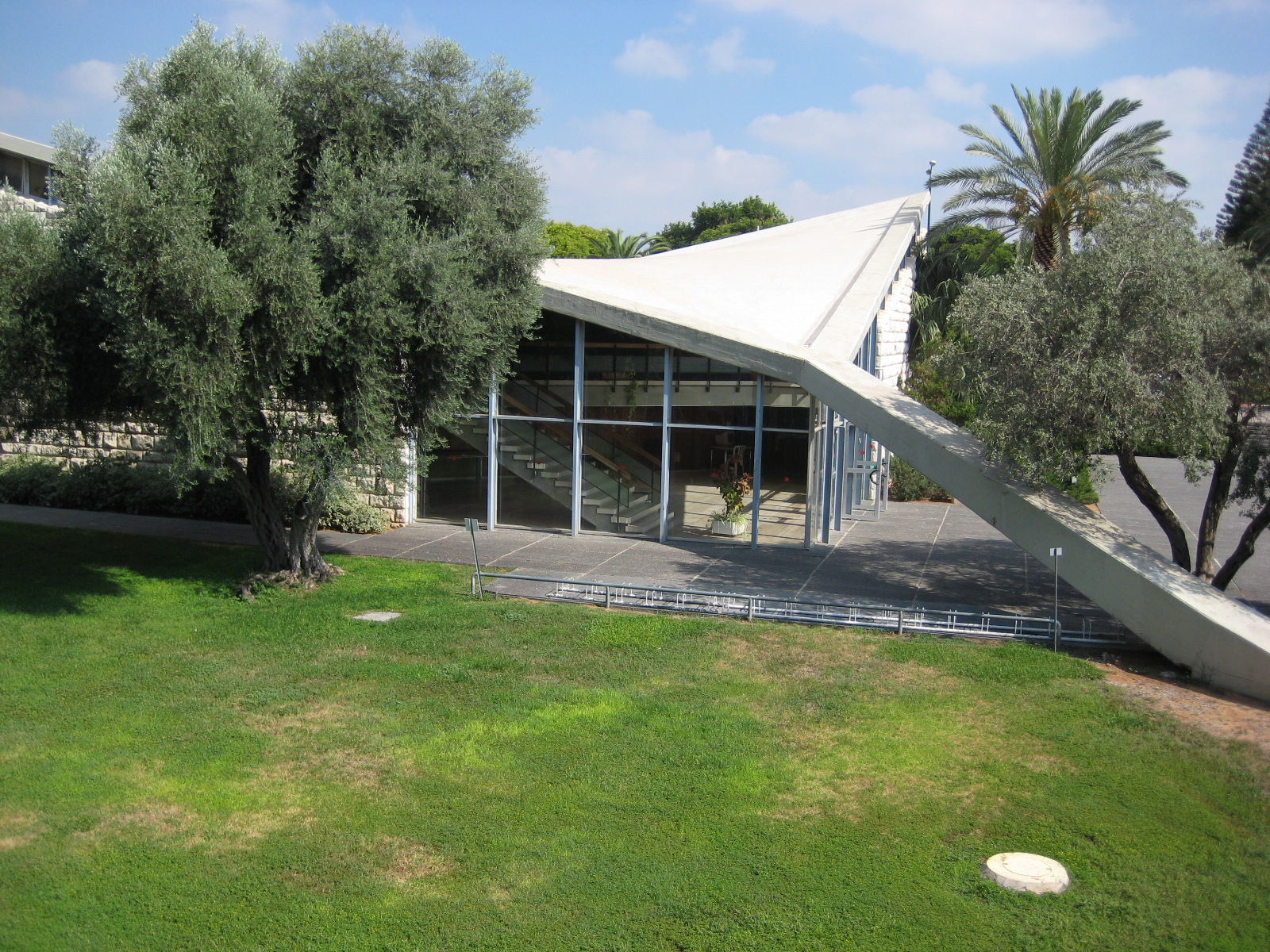
The Department of Agriculture of the Hebrew University of Jerusalem in Rehovot in 2008

On 29 February 1948, the Lehi blew up the Cairo to Haifa train shortly after it left Rehovot, killing 29 British soldiers and injuring 35. Lehi said the bombing was in retaliation for the Ben Yehuda Street bombing a week earlier. The Scotsman reported that both Weizmann's home and the Agricultural Institute were damaged in the explosion, although the sites were 1–2 miles [1.6–3.2 km] away. On 28 March 1948, Arabs attacked a Jewish convoy near Rehovot. In 1950, Rehovot, which had a population of about 18,000, was declared a city.

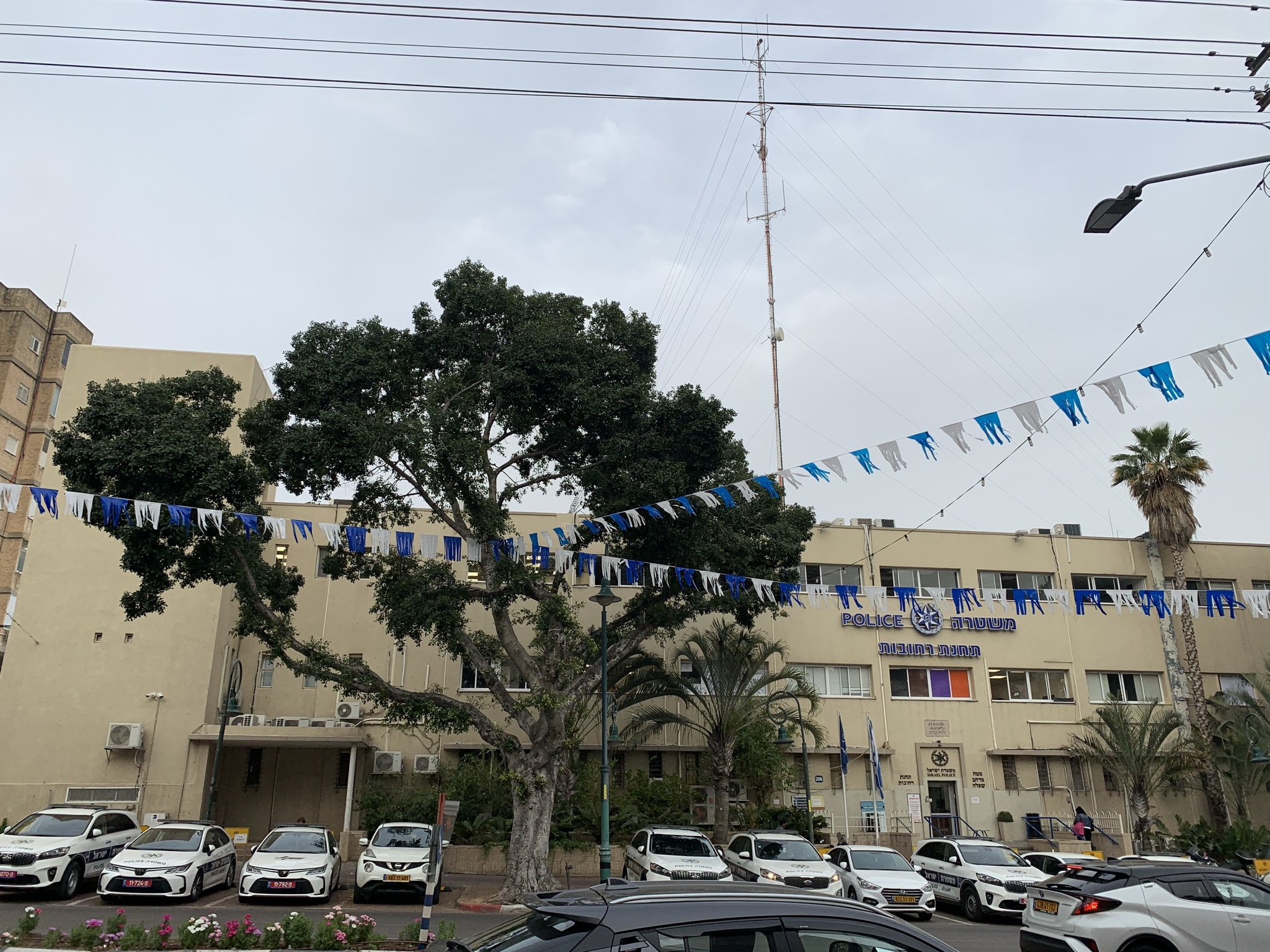
Rehovot Police Station

In the immediate years following the establishment of Israel, the Zarnuqa ma'abara (now named Kiryat Moshe) was established on the Southern side of Rehovot to house Jewish refugees from Eastern Europe and Arab lands. On the Southwest, the neighborhood of Kfar Gevirol (now named Ibn Gevirol, named after Solomon ibn Gabirol, 11th Century Sephardi Jewish Philosopher) was founded on lands near the depopulated Palestinian village of Al-Qubayba. Over the years, Kiryat Moshe expanded over lands of the depopulated Palestinian village of Zarnuqa. The mosque of the village, while abandoned, still stands. On the Southeast the neighborhood of Ramat Aharon were established. The city has since then expanded in all directions, geographically surrounding but not including the Kibbutz of Kvutzat Shiller and the Moshav of Gibton.

== Demographics ==
Historical population
Year	Pop.	±%
1914	955	—
1922	1,242	+30.1%
1931	3,193	+157.1%
1948	12,500	+291.5%
1955	26,000	+108.0%
1961	29,000	+11.5%
1972	39,300	+35.5%
1983	67,900	+72.8%
1995	85,200	+25.5%
2008	111,100	+30.4%
2015^{1}	132,700	+19.4%
2019	143,904	+8.4%
2022	152,084	+5.7%
2024	155,050	+2.0%
Source: Israel Central Bureau of Statistics^{1} end of year estimate

Between 1914 and 1991, the town's population rose from 955 to 81,000, and its area more than doubled. In 1995, there were 337,800 people living in the greater Rehovot area. As of 2007, the ethnic makeup of the city was 99.8% Jewish. There were 49,600 males and 52,300 females, of whom 31.6% were 19 years of age or younger, 16.1% between the ages of 20 and 29, 18.2% between 30 and 44, 18.2% from 45 to 59, 3.5% from 60 to 64, and 12.3% 65 years of age or older. The population growth rate was 1.8%.

In Rehovot, there are mainly Russian Jews, Yemenite Jews, and Ethiopian Jews, who are concentrated largely in the Kiryat Moshe and Oshiot areas. There is a growing community of religious Anglo-speaking people who primarily live in Northern Rehovot around the Weizmann Institute of Science.

According to the 2019 census, the population of Rehovot was counted to be 143,904, of which 143,536 people, comprising 99.7% of the city's population were classified as "Jews and Others", and 368 people, comprising 0.3% as "Arab".

== Education and culture ==
The city is home to the Weizmann Institute of Science, The Robert H Smith Faculty of Agriculture, Food and Environment of the Hebrew University of Jerusalem, and the Peres Academic Center College. There are also several smaller colleges in Rehovot that provide specialized and technical training. Kaplan Medical Center acts as an ancillary teaching hospital for the Medical School of the Hebrew University of Jerusalem.

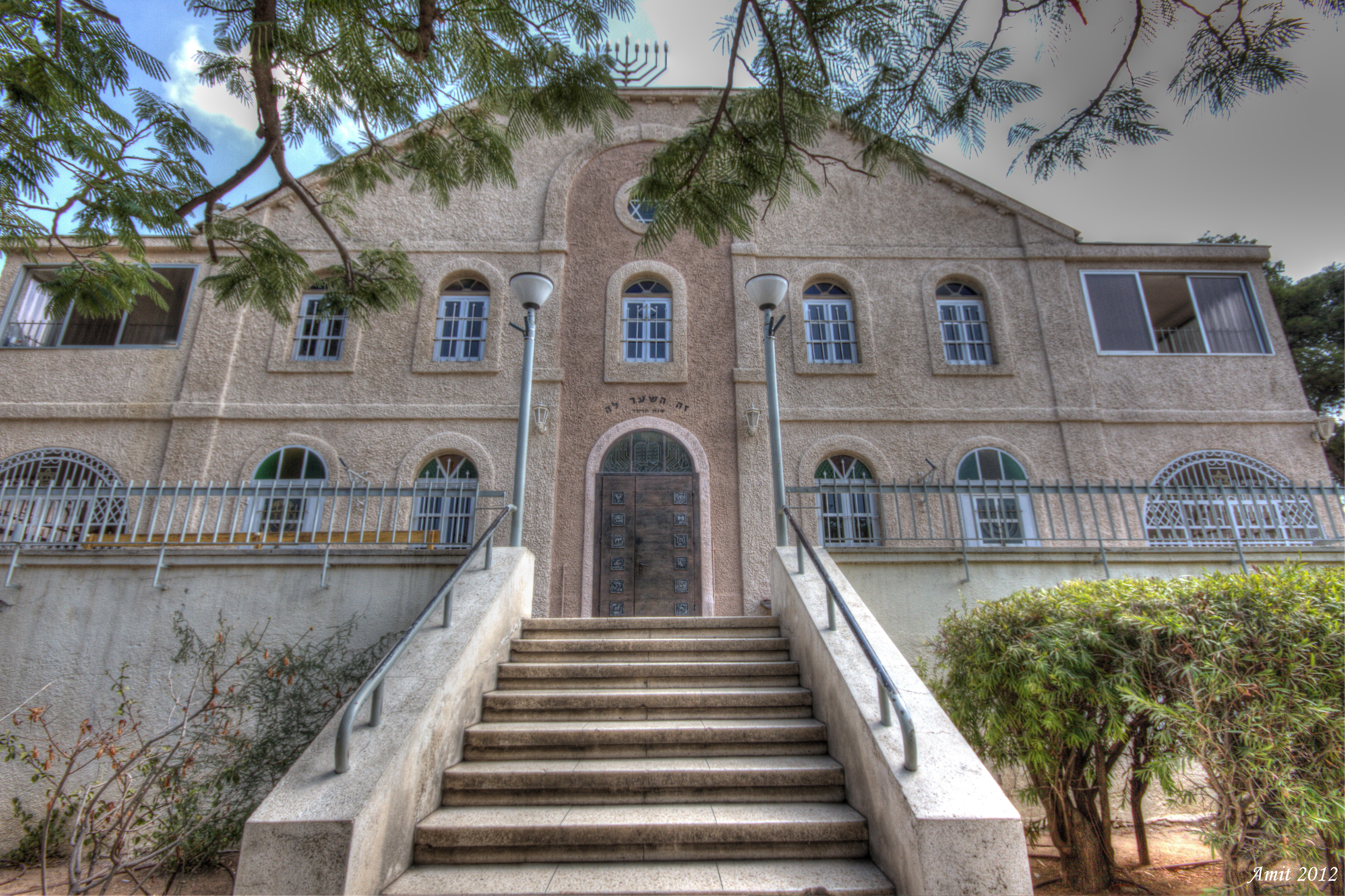
Central synagogue, Rehovot

The Minkov Orchard Museum was established in Rehovot with the assistance of the Swiss descendants of Zalma Minkov, whose husband planted the city's first citrus grove.

Rehovot is also home to the annual Rehovot International Live Statues Festival which includes many international participants.

== Economy ==
As of 2004, there were 41,323 salaried workers and 2,683 self-employed. The mean monthly wage for a salaried worker was ILS 6,732, a real change of −5.2% over the course of the previous year. Salaried males had a mean monthly wage of ILS 8,786 (a real change of −4.8%) versus ILS 4,791 for females (a real change of −5.3%). The mean income for the self-employed was 6,806. There were 1,082 people receiving unemployment benefits and 6,627 people receiving an income guarantee. In 2013, Rehovot had the highest average net monthly income among households in Israel, at NIS 16,800.

Rehovot is home to numerous industrial plants, and has an industrial park in the western part of the city. Among them are the Tnuva dairy plant, the Yafora-Tavori beverage factory, and the Feldman ice cream factory.

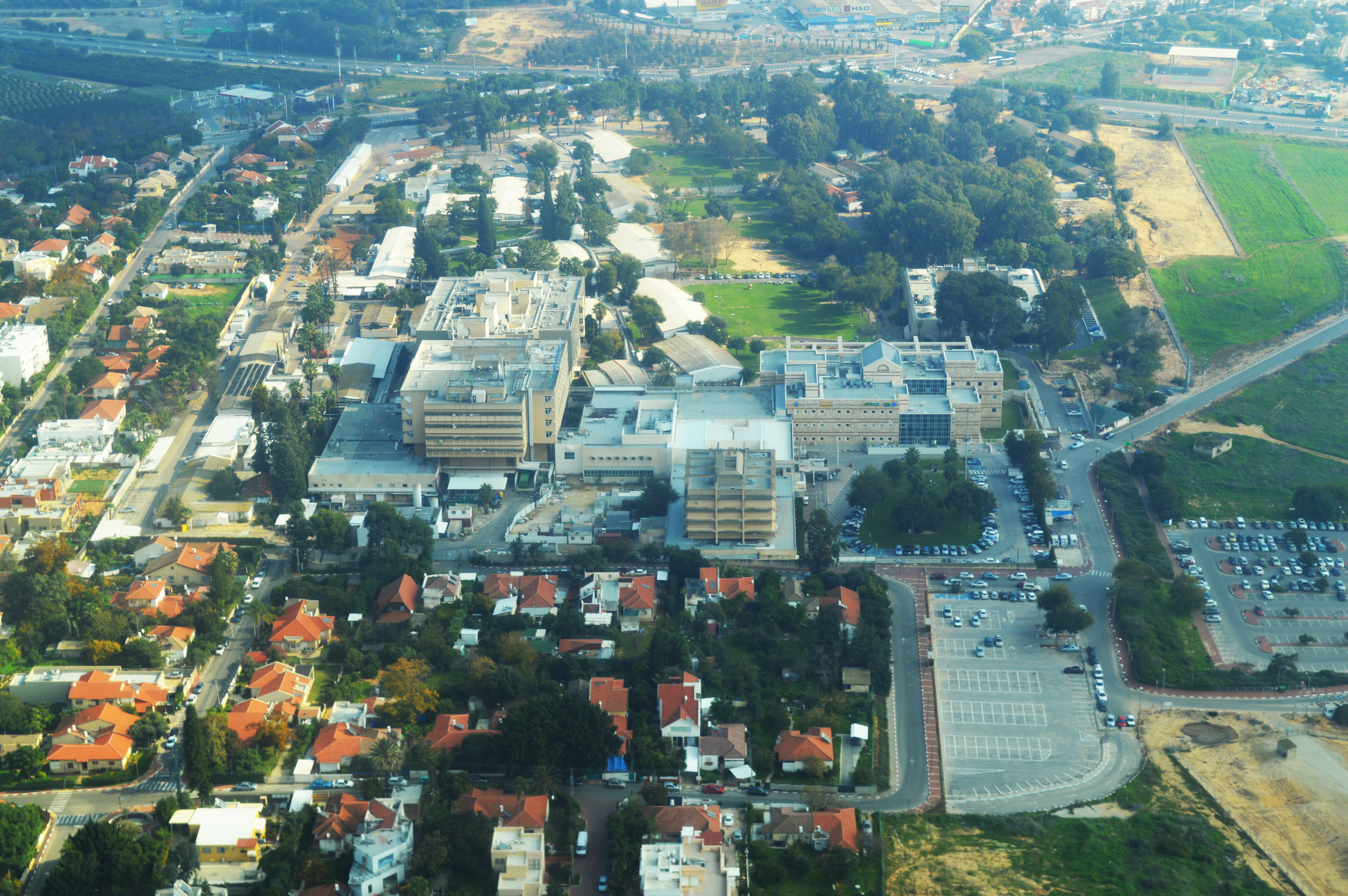
Aerial view of Kaplan Medical Center in Rehovot

The Tamar Science Park, established in 2000, is a high-tech park of 1,000 dunams (1.0 km^{2}) at the northern entrance of the city. The Tamar Science Park adjoins the older Kiryat Weizmann industrial park. Although the entire extended science park is largely conceived as an area of Rehovot, the Kiryat Weizmann part is actually under the municipal boundaries of neighboring Ness Ziona. Tamar Science Park is home to branches of leading hi-tech like Stratasys, Imperva, Applied Materials, El-Op, Indigo, Electra, Elbit Systems, and bio-tech companies like Aleph Farms.

== Sports ==
During the 1980s, some local swimmers excelled, thanks to the local Weisgal Center Water Park.

=== Football ===
Rehovot has had three clubs representing it at the top division of Israeli football: Maccabi Rehovot between 1949 and 1956, Maccabi Sha'arayim between 1963 and 1969 and again in 1985, and Hapoel Marmorek in the 1972–73 season. It also has club Bnei Yeechalal which plays at Liga Bet South B.

Today Maccabi Sha'arayim and Marmorek play in Liga Alef South, the third level; Maccabi Rehovot and Bnei Yeechalal play in Liga Gimel, the fifth and lowest division.

List of Rehovot men's football clubs playing at state level and above for the 2023–24 season:

Club	Founded	League	Level	Home Ground	Capacity
Maccabi Rehovot	1912	Liga Gimel Central	5	Kiryat Moshe	500
Hapoel Marmorek	1949	Liga Alef South	3	Itztoni Stadium	800
Maccabi Sha'arayim	1950	Liga Alef South	3	Maccabi Sha'araim Stadium	500
Bnei Yeechalal	2007	Liga Gimel Central	5	Kiryat Moshe	500

=== Basketball ===
Rehovot has one basketball club Maccabi Rehovot B.C. The team plays in the Liga Leumit.

=== Handball ===
Rehovot has one handball club Maccabi Rehovot. The team plays in the Ligat Ha'Al.

== Transportation ==
=== Public transportation ===
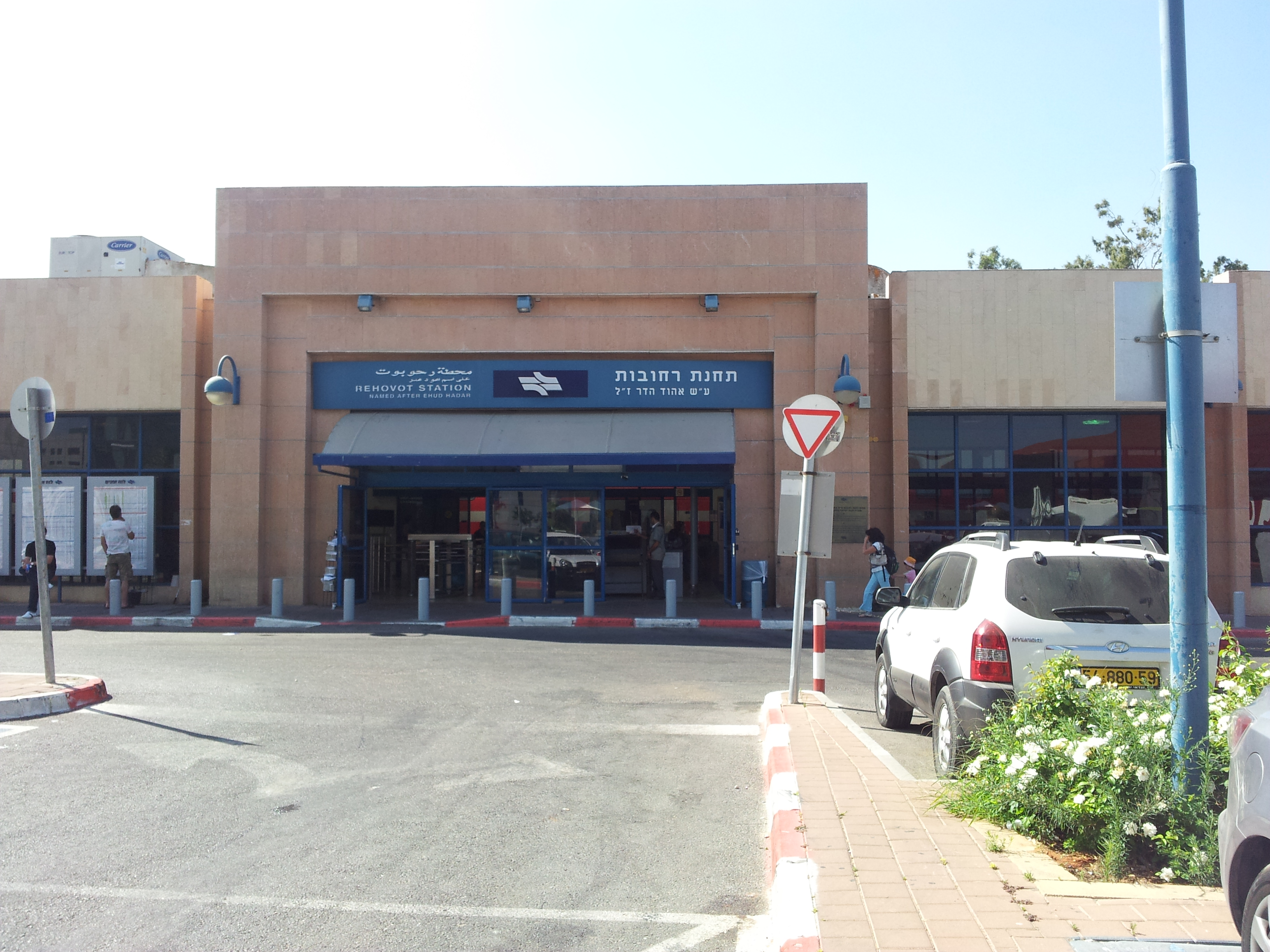
Rehovot railway station

Rehovot railway station is a suburban commuter railway station serving the city. It is a historic station that was abandoned in 1948 and reopened in 1990 with a suburban service to Tel Aviv, which is important because many Rehovot residents work in Tel Aviv. More reconstruction work began in 2000, which included the two new passenger terminals, a pedestrian tunnel under the railway, a bus terminal and two large parking lots. The station is situated on the Tel Aviv suburban line (Binyamina/Netanya – Tel Aviv – Rehovot/Ashkelon Suburban Service). All trains in this service stop at Rehovot, and some trains terminate at the station. This line connects the city to Tel Aviv via Lod.

The city will be served by 5 Metro Stations along one of the Southern Branches of Line M1 as part of the Tel Aviv Metro Project. This line will connect the city to Tel Aviv via Holon.

The city is served internally and connected to other cities by bus routes operated by Egged Bus Company.

=== Roads ===
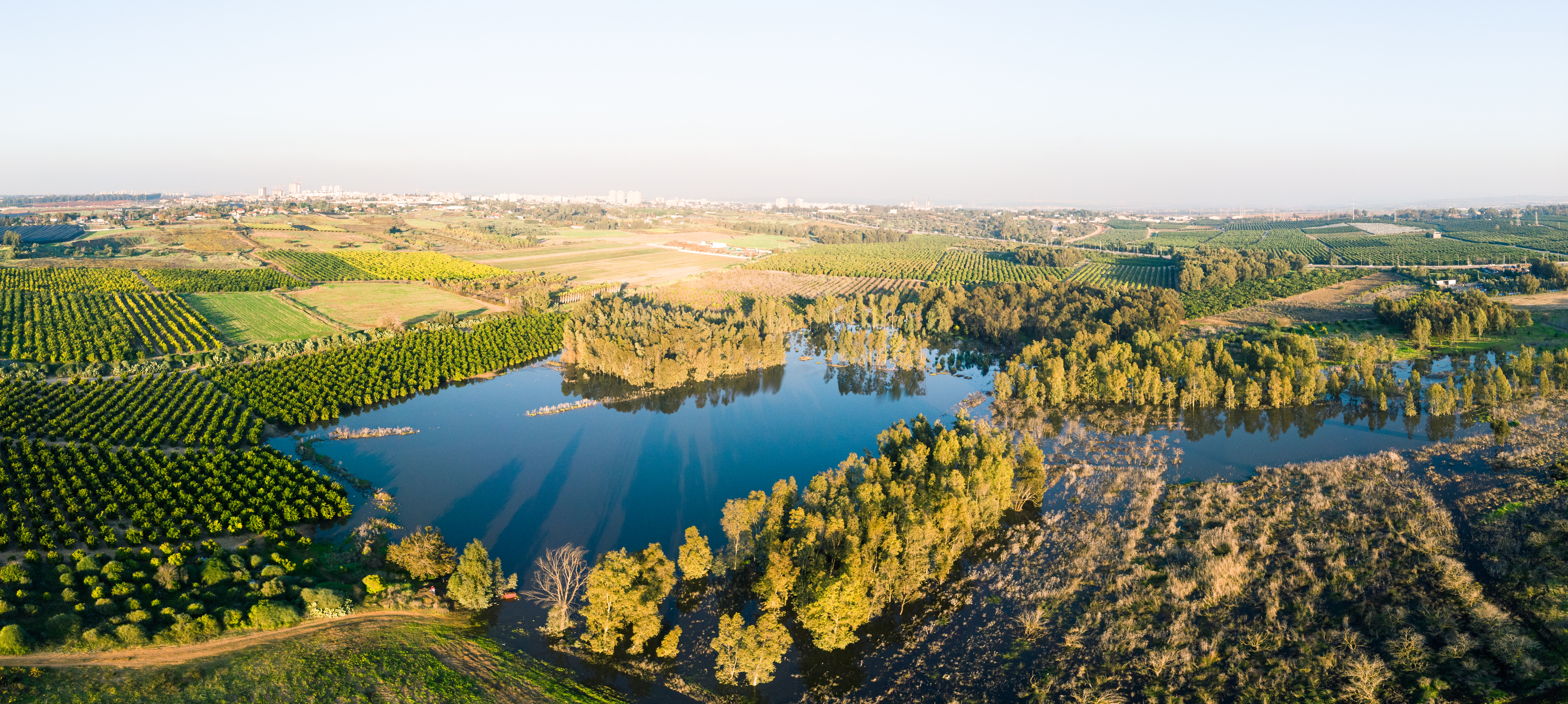
Rehovot's winter pond

Rehovot is located between Highway 40 and Highway 42. Highway 40 connects the city to Kiryat Gat and Beersheva in the South, while Highway 42 connects it to Ashdod. Highway 40 connects the city to Lod-Ramla to the North, also providing connection to Ben Gurion Airport, and bypassing Metro Tel Aviv along the eastern edge, whereas Highway 42 connects the city to Rishon LeZion and the urban center of Metro Tel Aviv.

Rehovot also has access to the east–west Motorway 431, connecting the city to Modi'in as well as to Jerusalem on the East.

Route 412 (Herzl Street) is a regional road that goes through the city center in a Northwest-Southeast Direction, and connects it to neighboring Ness Ziona.

== Mayors ==
- 1950–1955: Benzion Horvitz
- 1955–1968: Yitzhak Katz
- 1968–1969: Moshe Barzilay
- 1969–1978: Shmuel Rechtman
- 1978–1989: Yehezkel Harmelekh
- 1989–1993: Michael Lapidot
- 1993–1998: Yakov Sendler
- 1998–2009: Yehoshua Forrer
- 2009–2024: Rahamim Malul
- 2024–present: Matan Dil

== Voting Patterns ==
In the 2022 election, 50 percent of voters in Rehovot voted for the parties of the right-wing coalition led by Benjamin Netanyahu, while 46 percent voted for the parties of the center-left coalition led by Yair Lapid and 0.3 percent voted for the Arab parties.

In the 2026 election, 48 percent of voters in Rehovot voted for the parties of the center-left coalition led by Gadi Eisenkot, while 46 percent voted for the parties of the right-wing coalition led by Benjamin Netanyahu and 0.4 percent voted for the Arab parties. An additional 3.7 percent voted for the Reservists, and 1.9 percent voted for Amcha Yisrael. Voter turnout increased 13 percent from the 2022 election.

== Twin towns and sister cities ==
Rehovot is twinned with:

- Albuquerque, United States
- Bistrița, Romania
- Grenoble, France
- Heidelberg, Germany
- Paraná, Argentina
- Rochester, United States
- Valjevo, Serbia

== Gallery ==
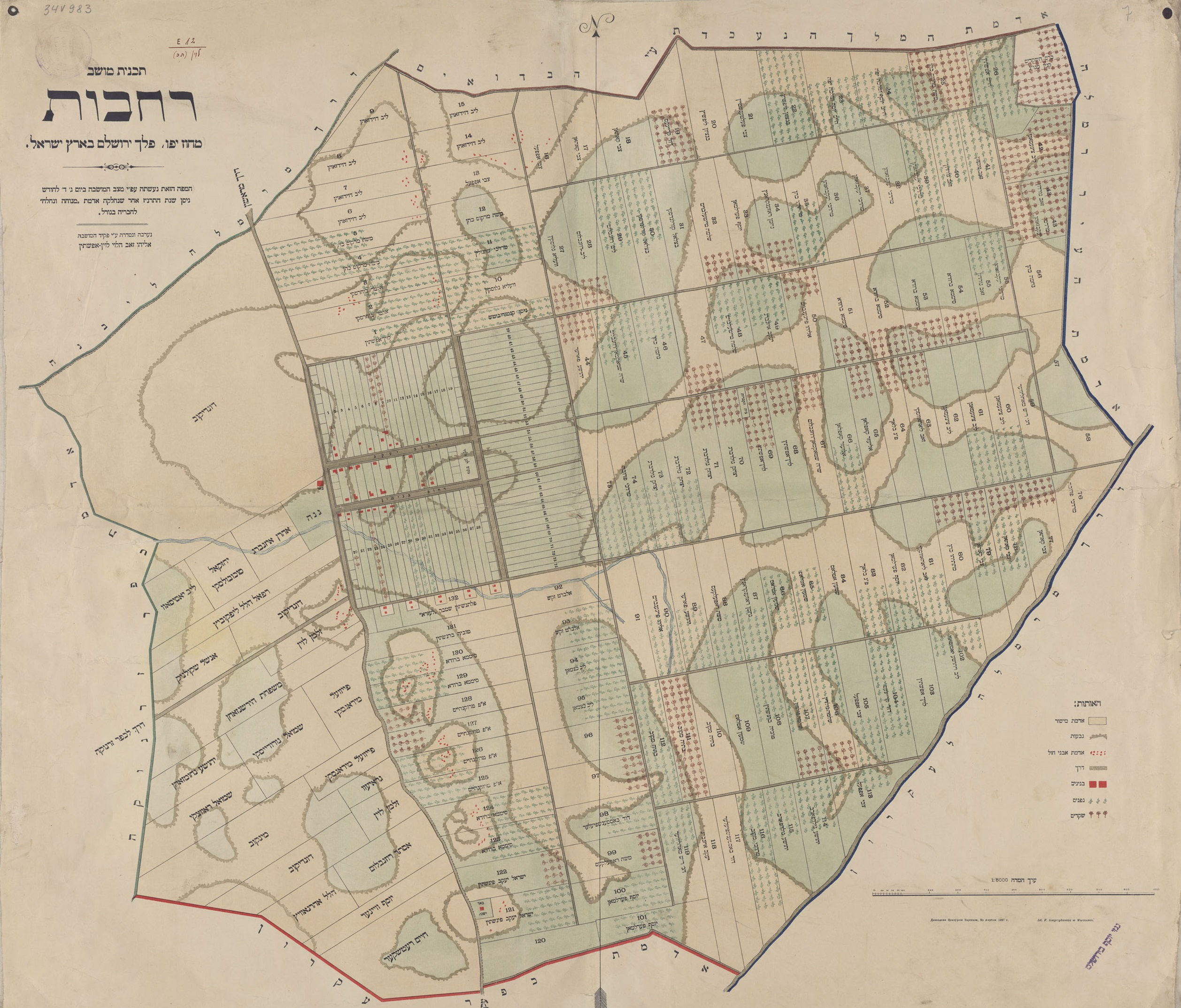
Map of Rehovot in 1897

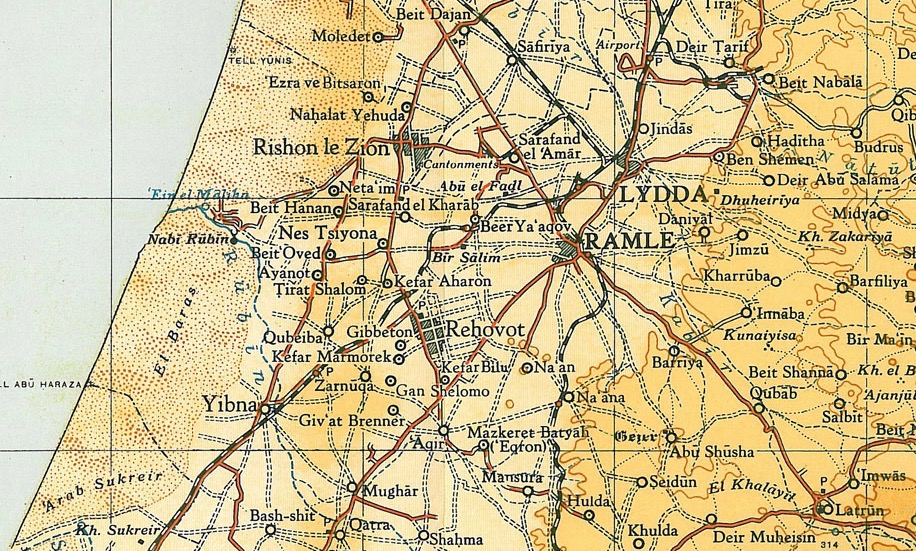
Rehovot 1945 1:250,000

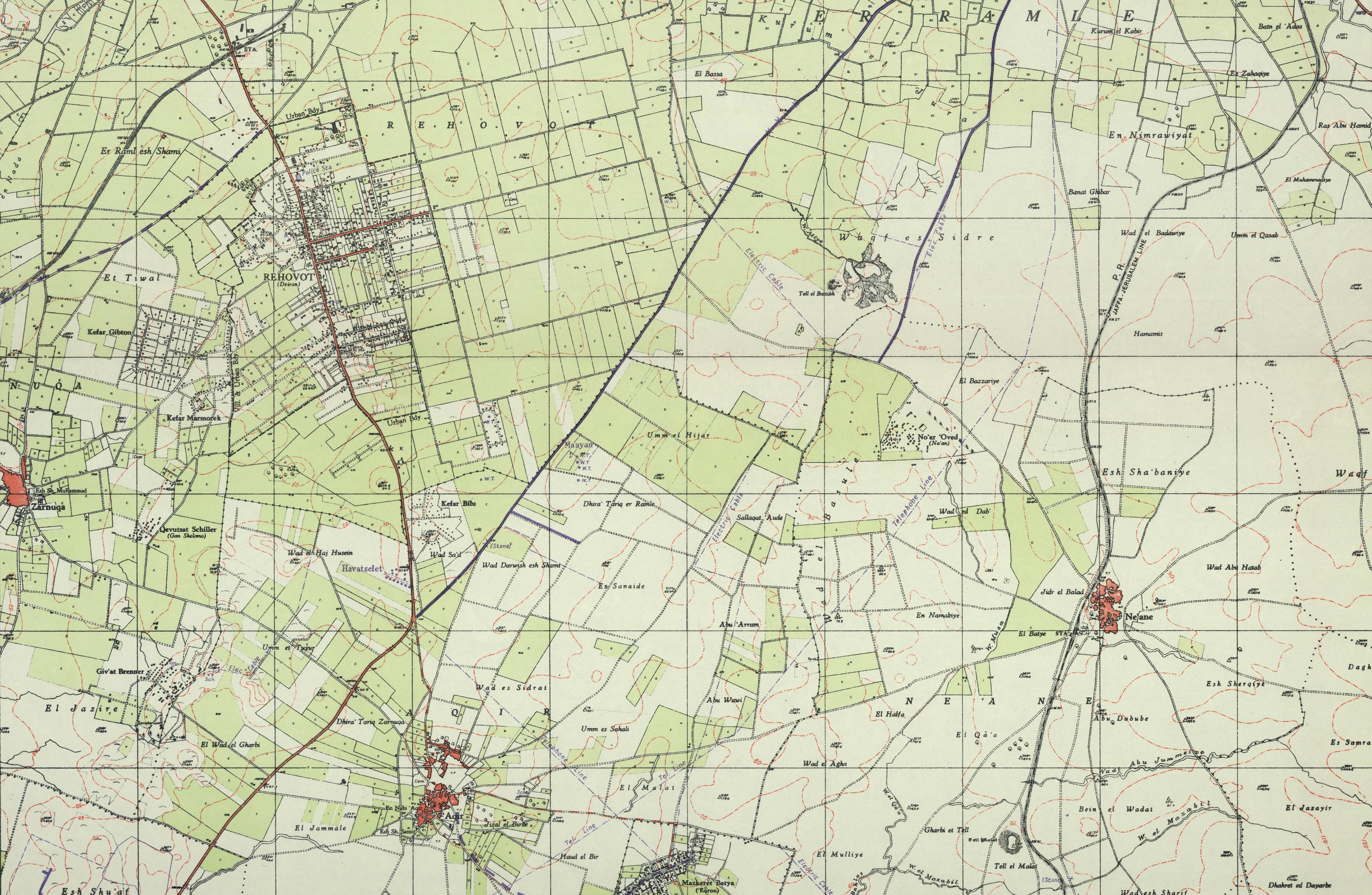
Rehovot 1948 1:20,000

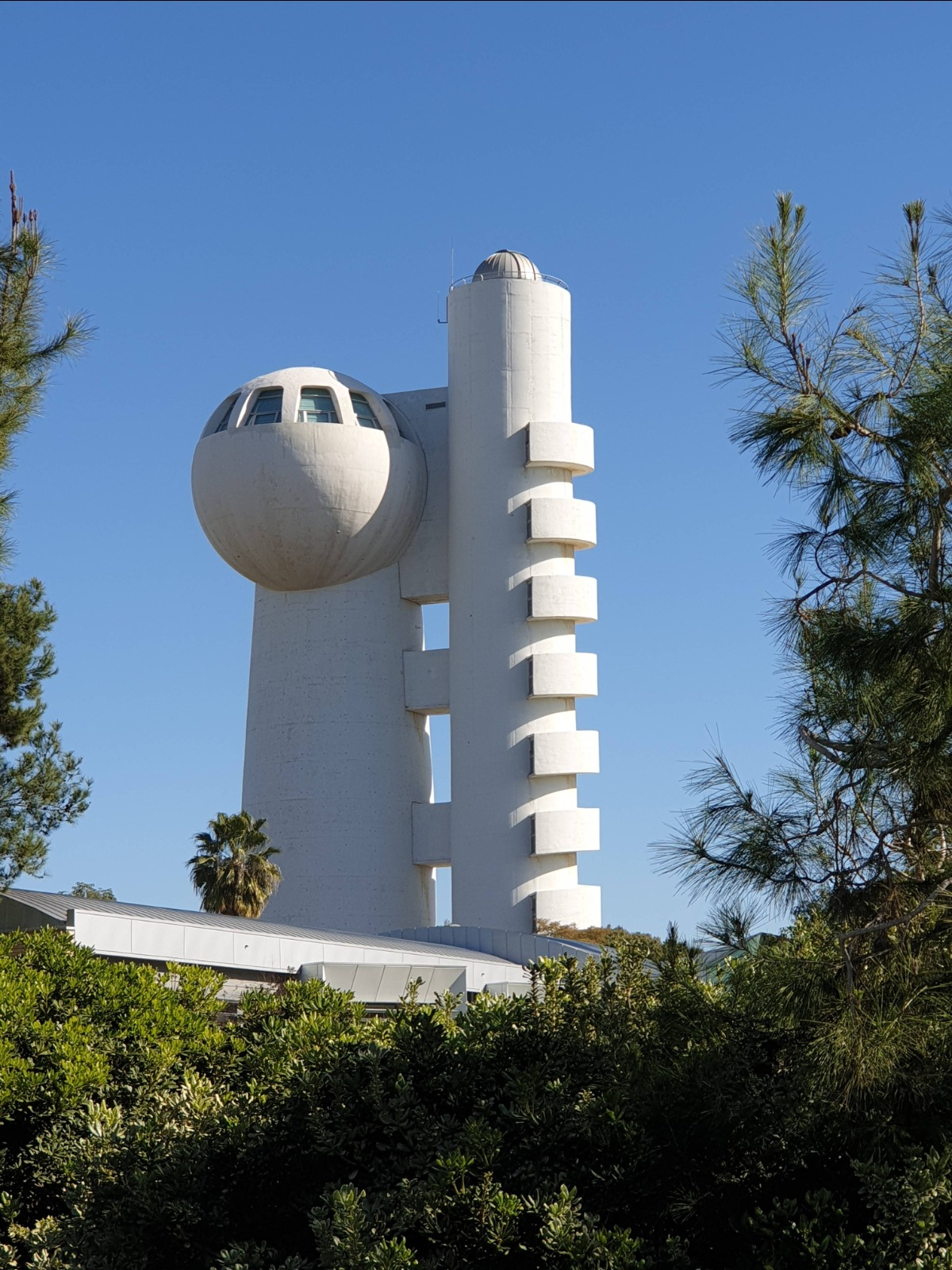
Particle accelerator at the Weizmann Institute of Science

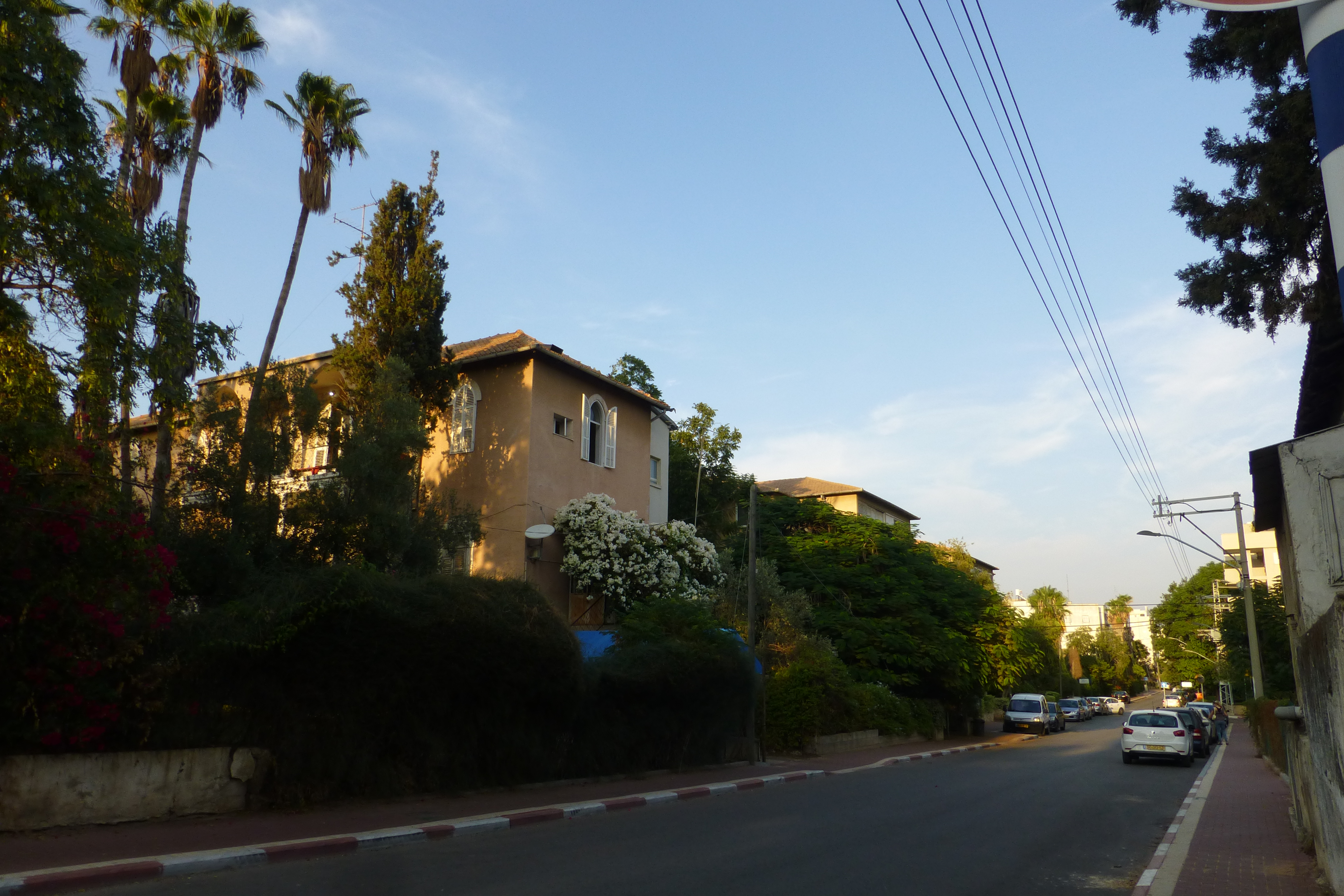
The "Millionaires' Houses" street in Rehovot

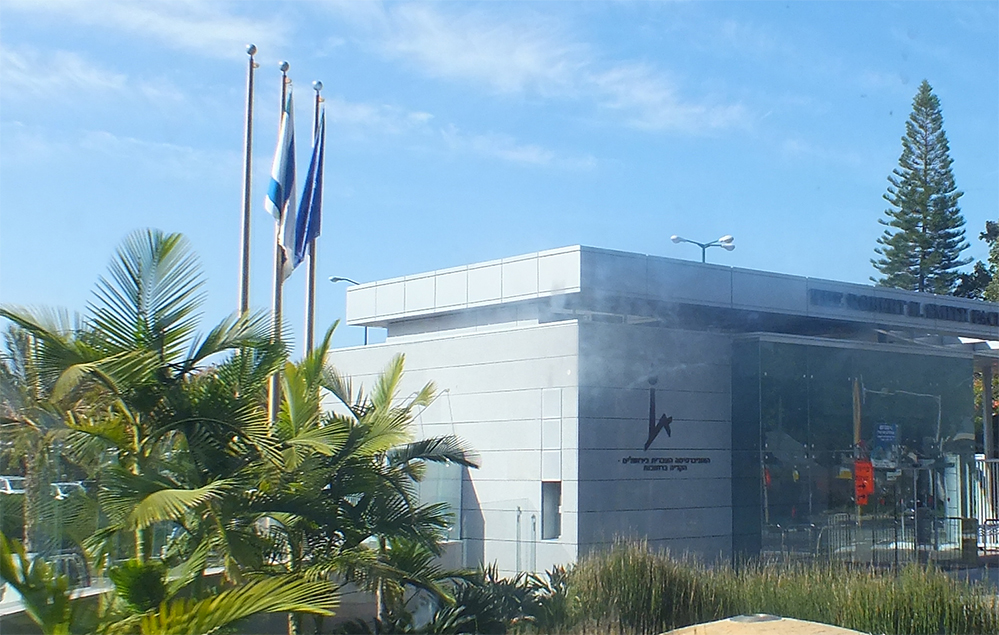
The Robert H. Smith Faculty of Agriculture, Food and Environment (of the Hebrew University of Jerusalem)

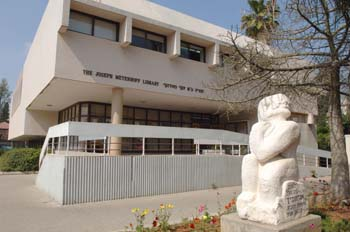
Rehovot Library

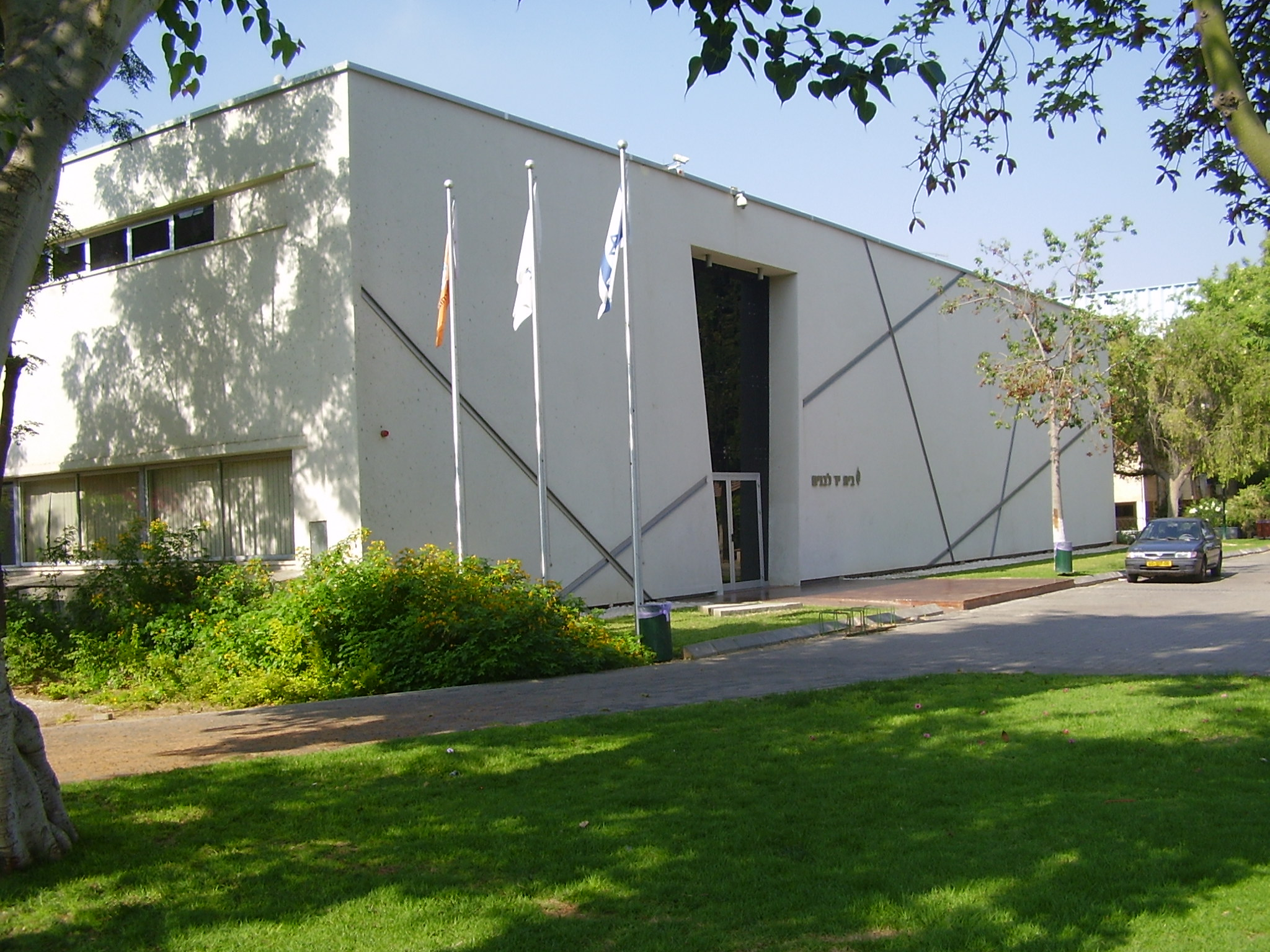
Beit Yad LeBanim in Rehovot

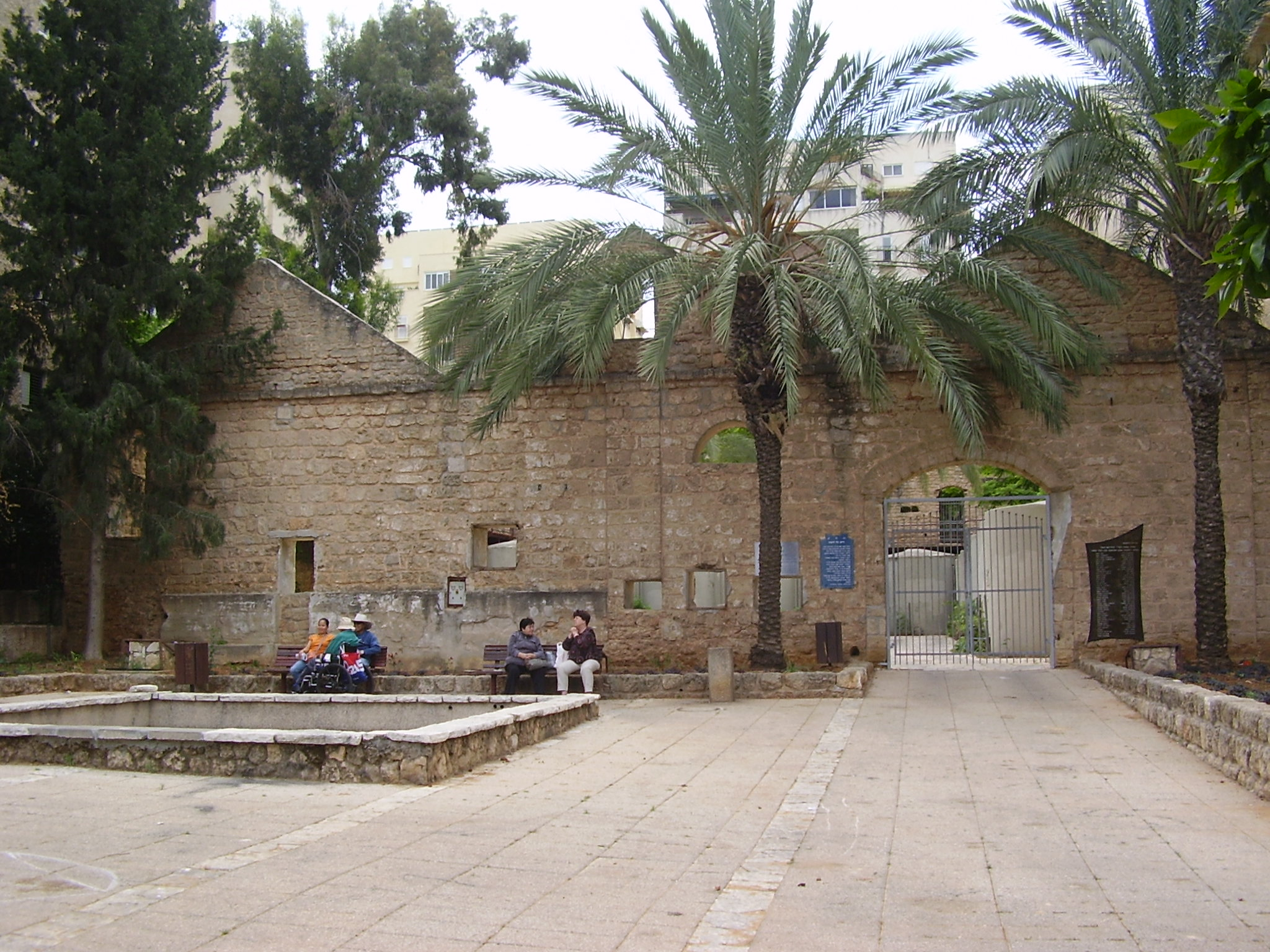
Rehovot's old winery

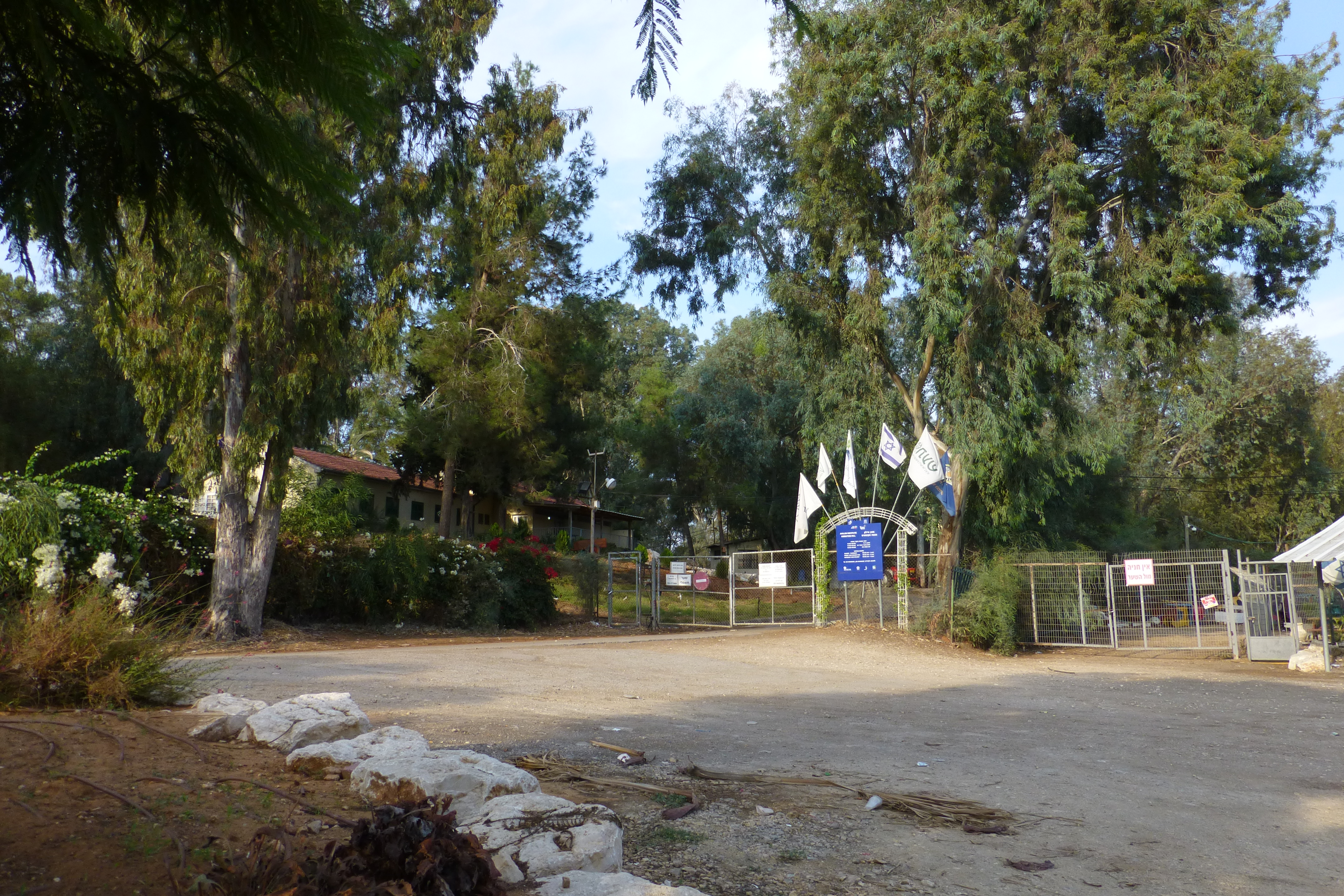
The Ayalon Institute in Rehovot

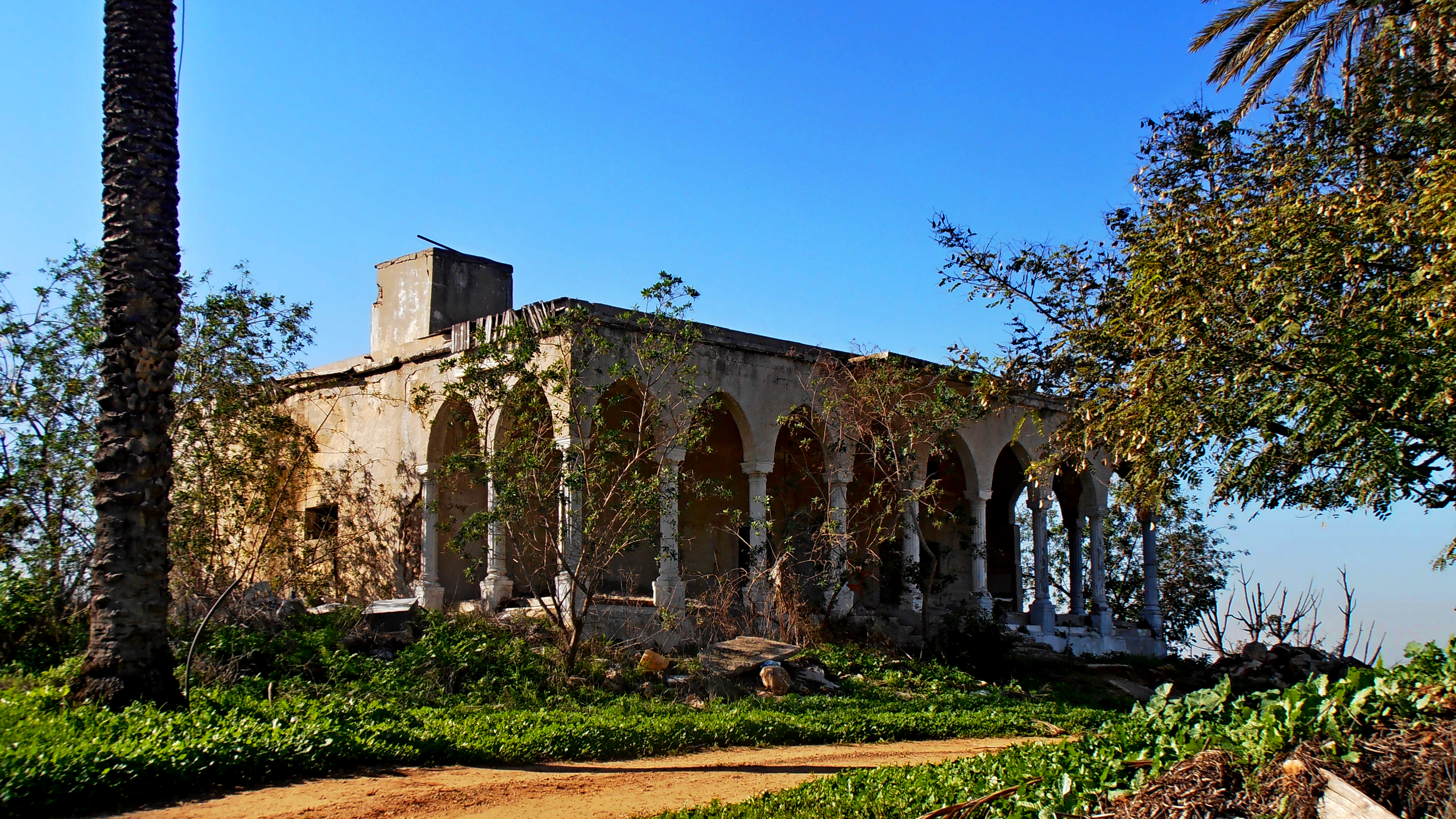
Tel Shalaf (Eltekeh) biblical city remains in Rehovot

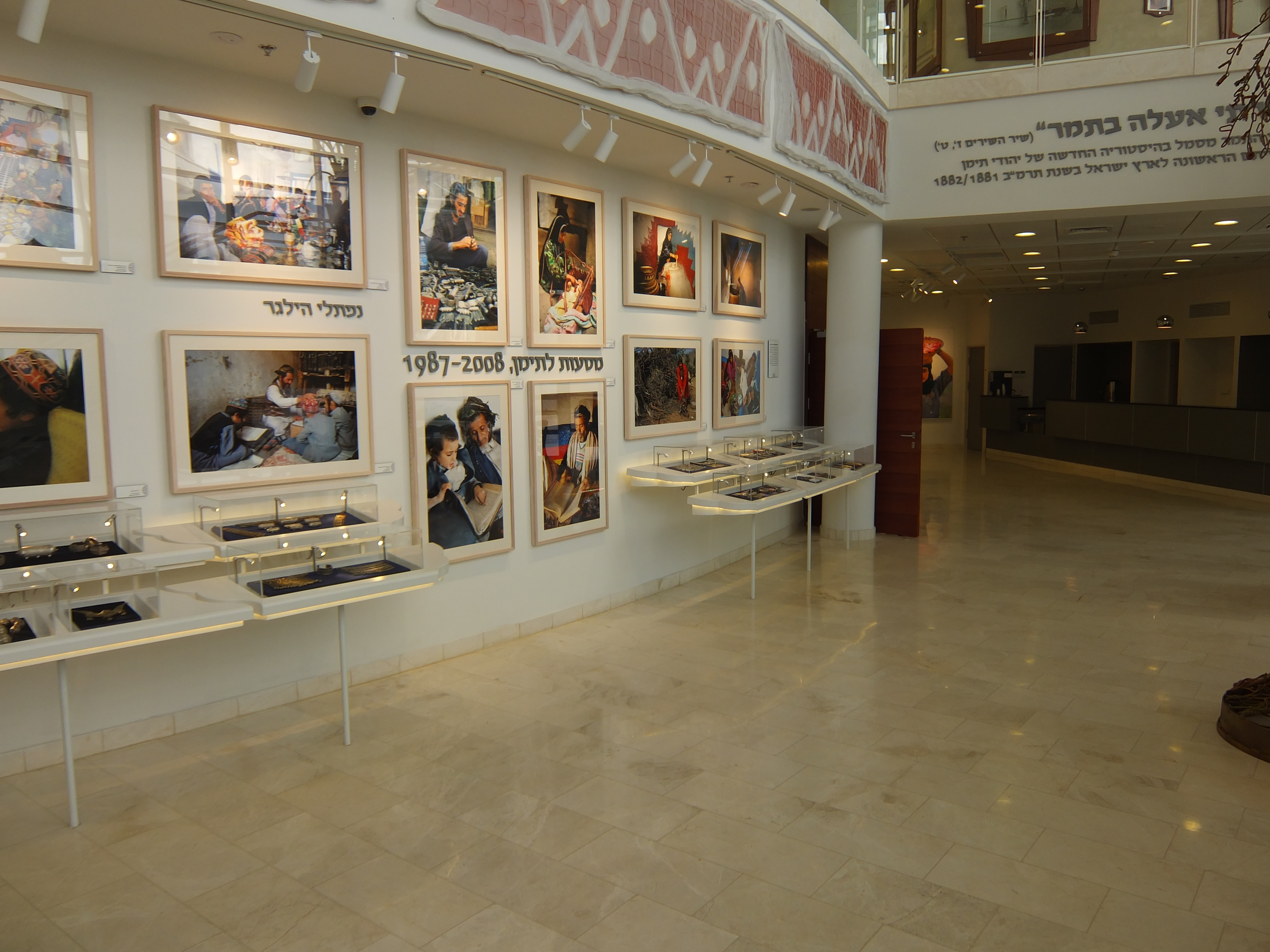
Yemenite-Jewish Heritage Center in Rehovot

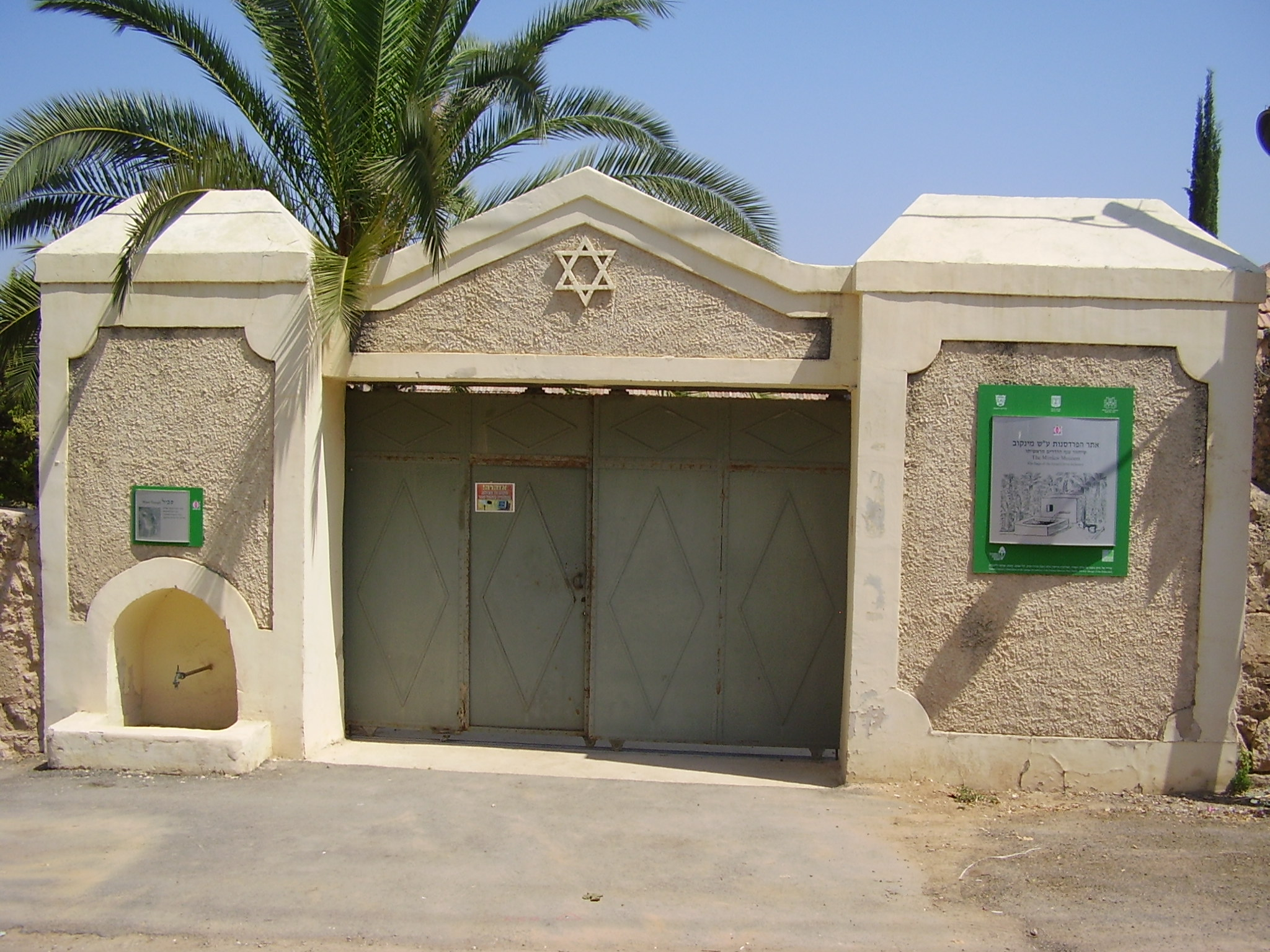
Gate to the Minkov Orchard in Rehovot

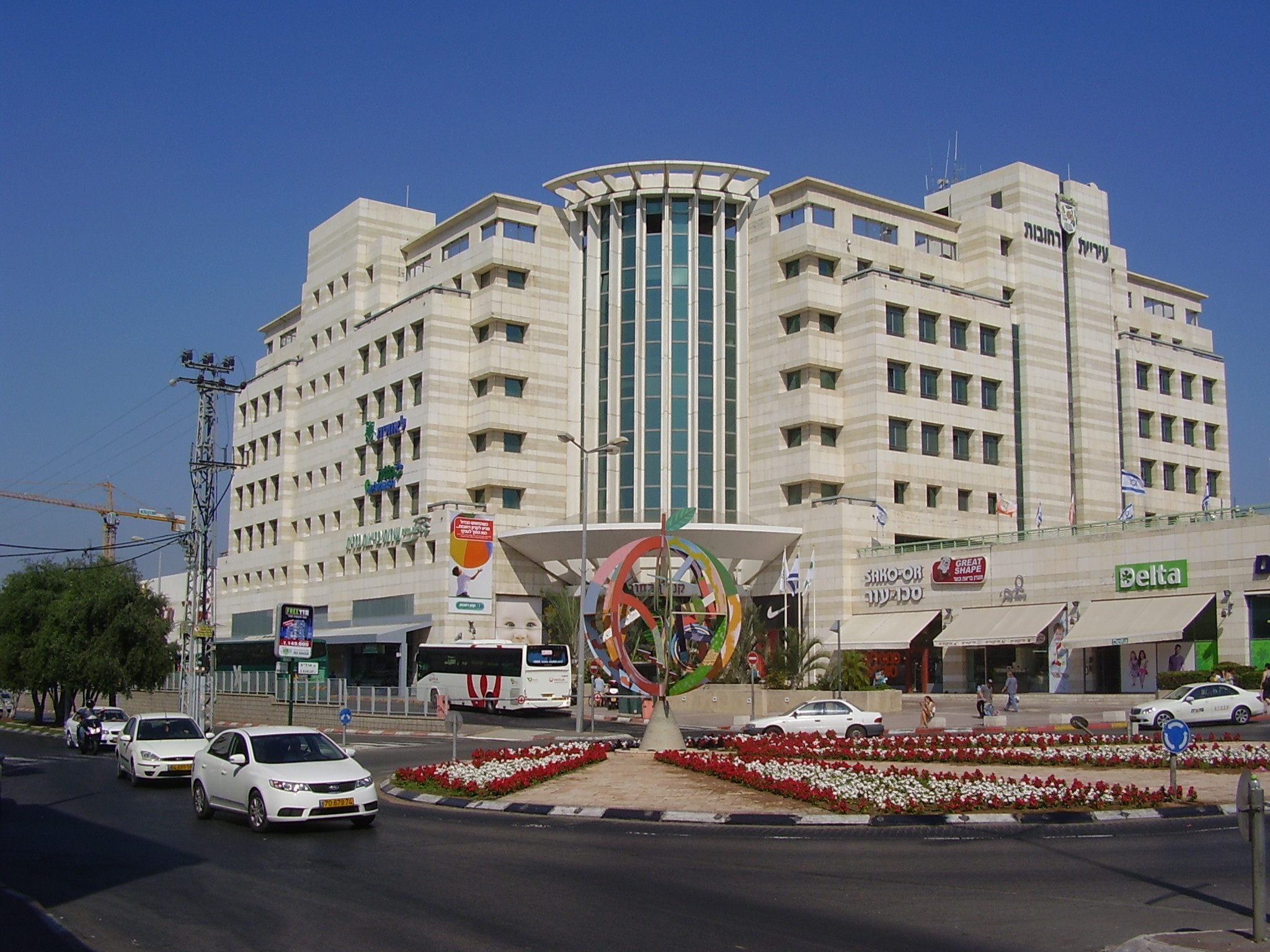
Rehovot mall, municipality, and the cinema complex

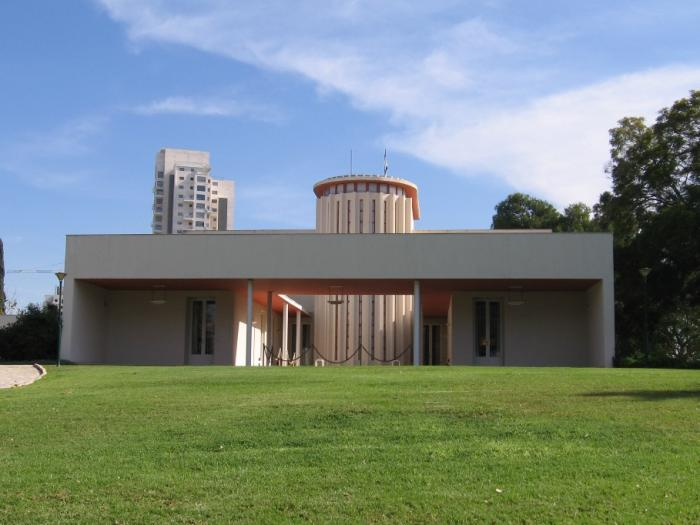
Weizmann House

== Notable people ==
For more information see: Category:People from Rehovot

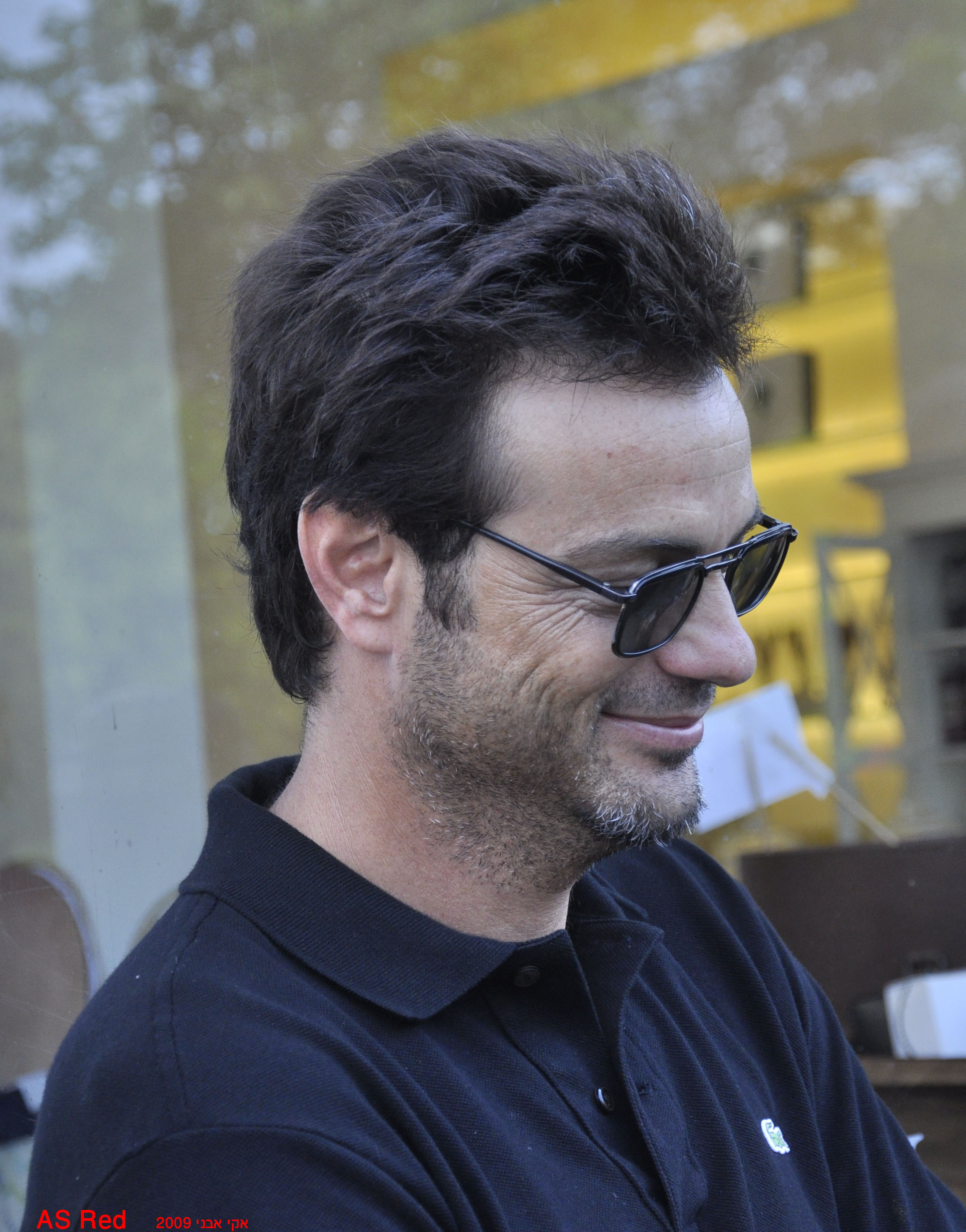
Aki Avni

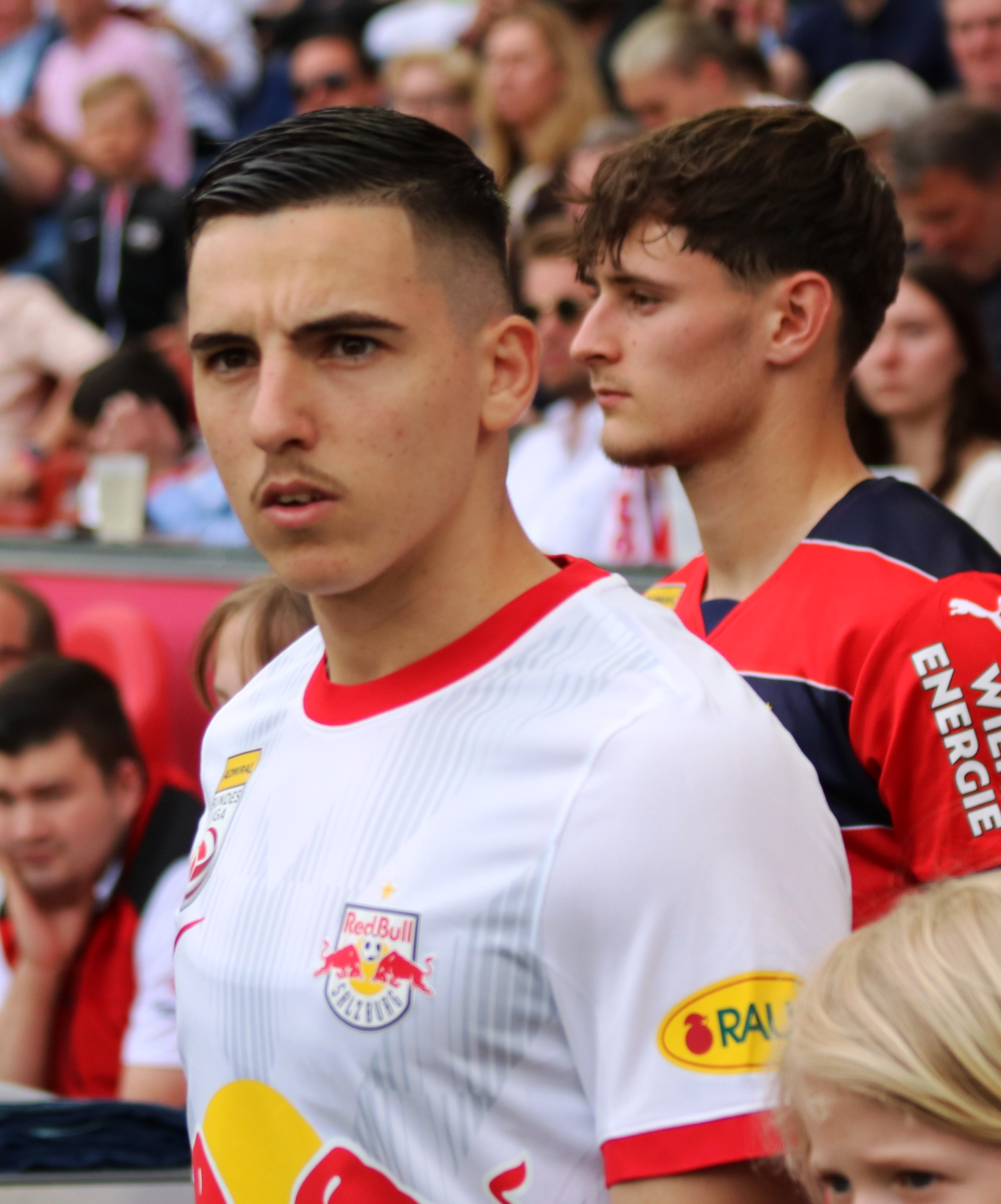
Oscar Gloukh

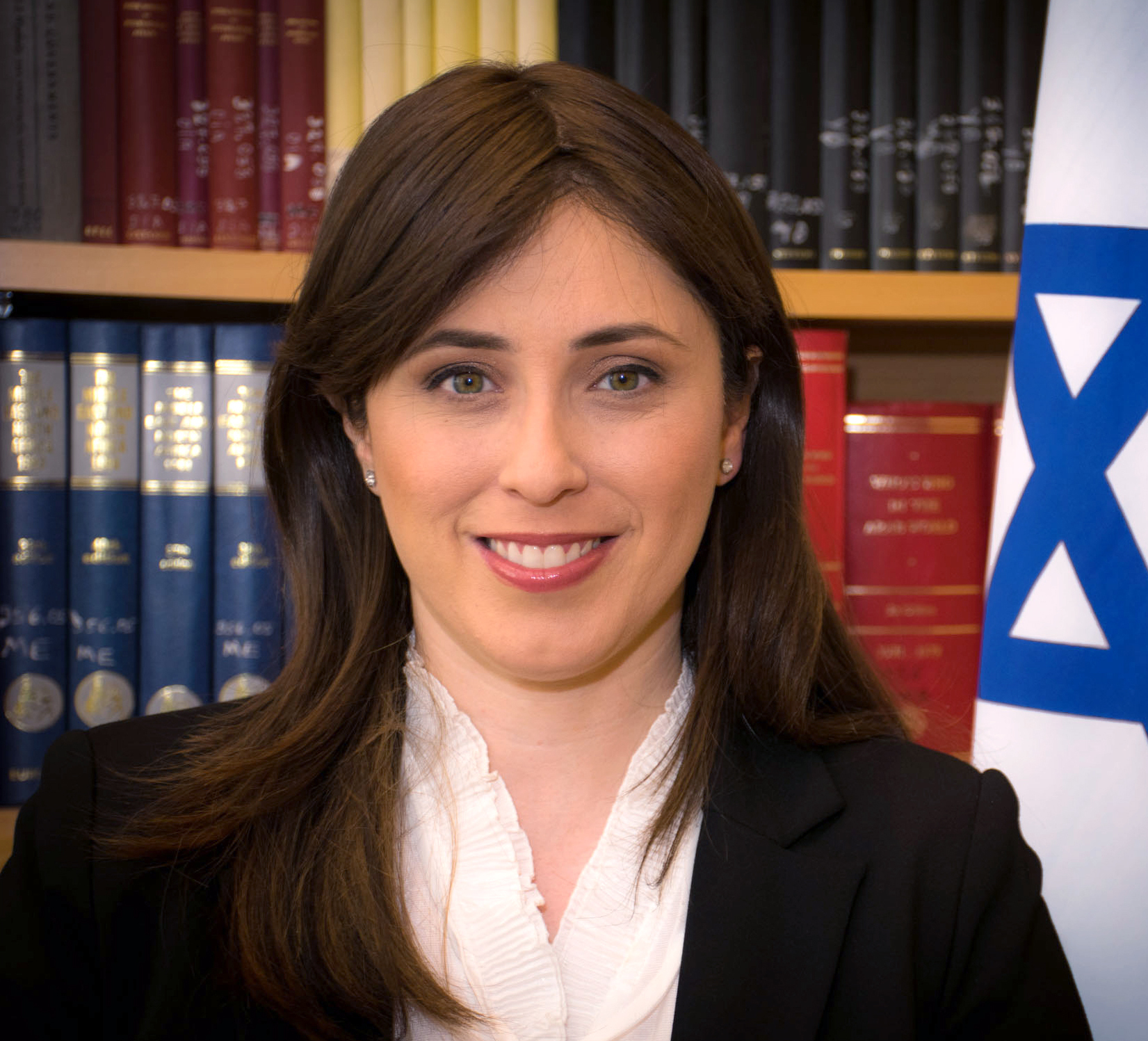
Tzipi Hotovely

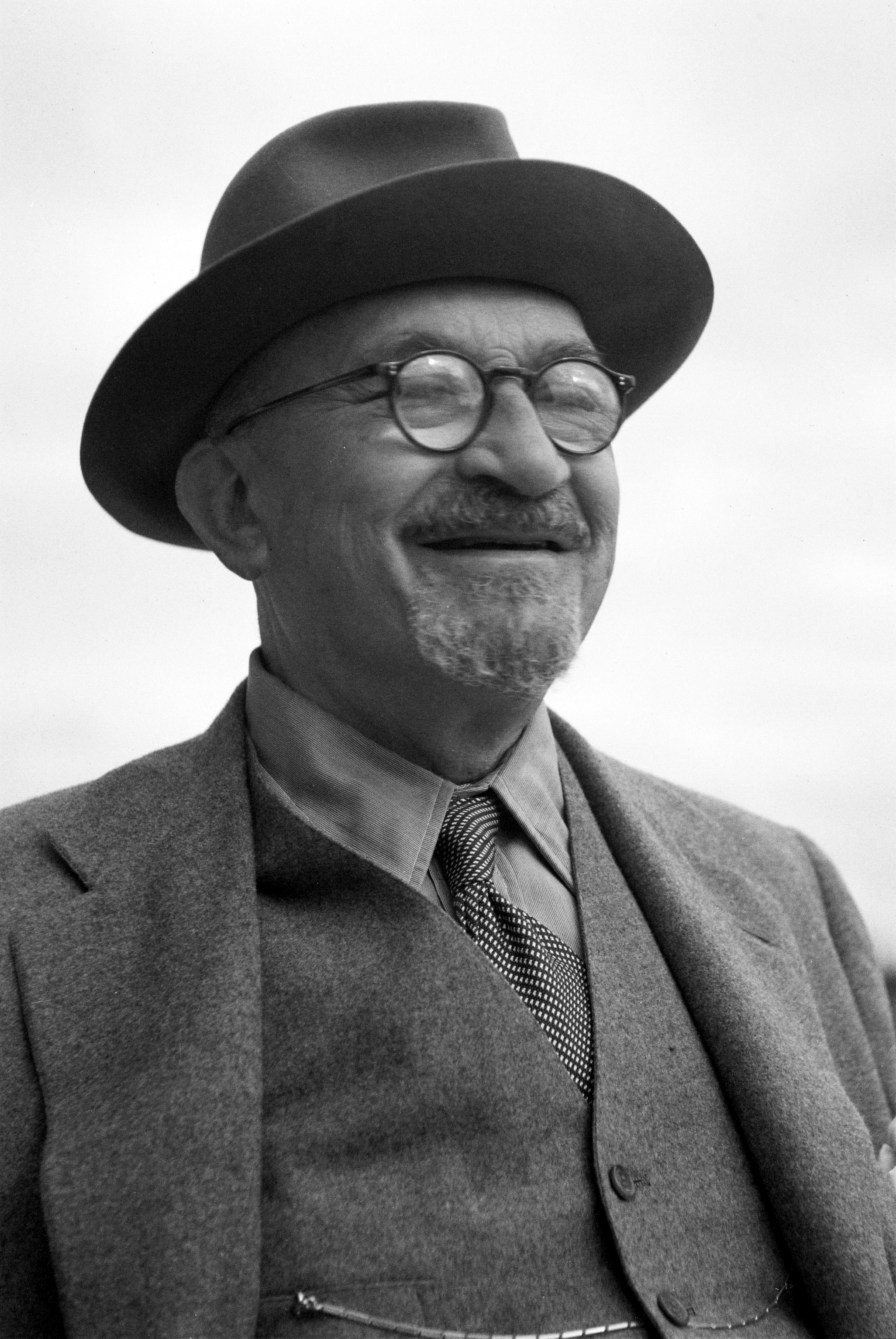
Chaim Weizmann

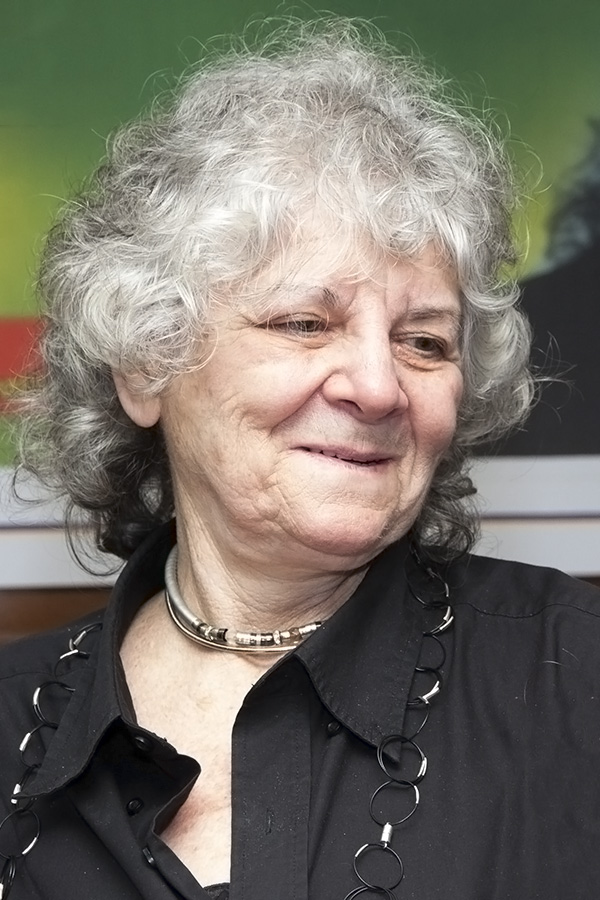
Ada Yonath

- Nili Abramski (born 1970) – Professional long-distance runner
- Dan Almagor (born 1935) – Playwright
- Gali Atari (born 1953) – Singer, won the Eurovision Song Contest 1979
- Aki Avni (born 1967) – Actor
- Saar Badishi (born 1971) – Singer, actor and voice actor
- Shelly Bobritsky (born 2001), Olympic swimmer in artistic swimming
- Shawn Dawson (born 1993) – Professional basketball player
- Amos de-Shalit (1926–1969) – Nuclear physicist and Israel Prize laureate
- Aryeh Frimer (born 1946) – Chemist and rabbi
- Shlomo Glickstein (born 1958) – Professional tennis player
- Oscar Gloukh (born 2004) – Professional football player
- Eyal Golan (born 1971) – Singer
- Gidi Gov (born 1950) – Singer
- Michal Hein (born 1968) – Olympic windsurfer
- Eres Holz (born 1977) – Composer
- Tzipi Hotovely (born 1978) – Ambassador of Israel to the United Kingdom
- Aharon Isser (1958–1995) – Aeronautical engineer
- Roi Kahat (born 1992) – Professional football player
- Aharon Katzir (1914–1972) – Biophysicist
- Ephraim Katzir (1916–2009) – Biophysicist and fourth President of the State of Israel
- Sam Katz (born 1950) – 42nd Mayor of Winnipeg
- Olga Kirsch (1924–1997) – South African and Israeli poet
- Nir Levine (born 1962) – Professional football player
- Shlomit Malka (born 1993) – Model
- Rahamim Malul (born 1946) – Mayor of Rehovot from 2009 to 2024
- Erez Markovich (born 1978) – Professional basketball player
- Arnon Milchan (born 1944) – Hollywood film producer
- Matan Naor (born 1980) – Professional basketball player
- Afik Nissim (born 1981) – Professional basketball player
- Chaim L. Pekeris (1908–1993) – Israeli-American physicist and mathematician
- Talia Rahimi (born 1978) – Author
- Hadar Ratzon-Rotem (born 1978) – Actor
- Shmuel Rechtman (1924–1988) – Mayor of Rehovot from 1970 to 1979, born in Rehovot
- Sergey Richter (born 1989) – Olympic sport shooter
- Danny Robas (born 1957) – Singer
- Zdenka Samish (1904–2008) – Czech-Israeli food technology researcher, director of the Department of Food Technology at the Agricultural research in Israel
- Yossi Sarid (1940–2015) – Politician and news commentator
- Eliezer Sherbatov (born 1991) – Canadian-Israeli ice hockey player
- Idit Silman (born 1980) – Member of the Knesset for Likud party, and Minister of Environmental Protection
- Asaf Sirkis (born 1969) – Jazz drummer, composer, and educator
- Haim Steinbach (born 1944) – Artist
- David Tal (born 1950) – Former member of the Knesset for Kadima party
- Israel Tal (1924–2010) – Israel Defense Forces general, designer of Israel's Merkava tank
- Amir Weintraub (born 1986) – Professional tennis player
- Chaim Weizmann (1874–1952) – First President of the State of Israel
- Gadi Yevarkan (born 1981) – Former member of the Knesset for the Likud party
- Raz Yirmiya (born 1956) – Behavioral neuroscientist
- S. Yizhar (1916–2006) – Writer
- Ada Yonath (born 1939) – Crystallographer at the Weizmann Institute of Science and first Israeli woman Nobel Prize winner

== See also ==
- Weizmann Institute of Science
- Kaplan Medical Center
