= Talia Rahimi =

Israeli author, poet, teacher and linguist

- טליה רחימי
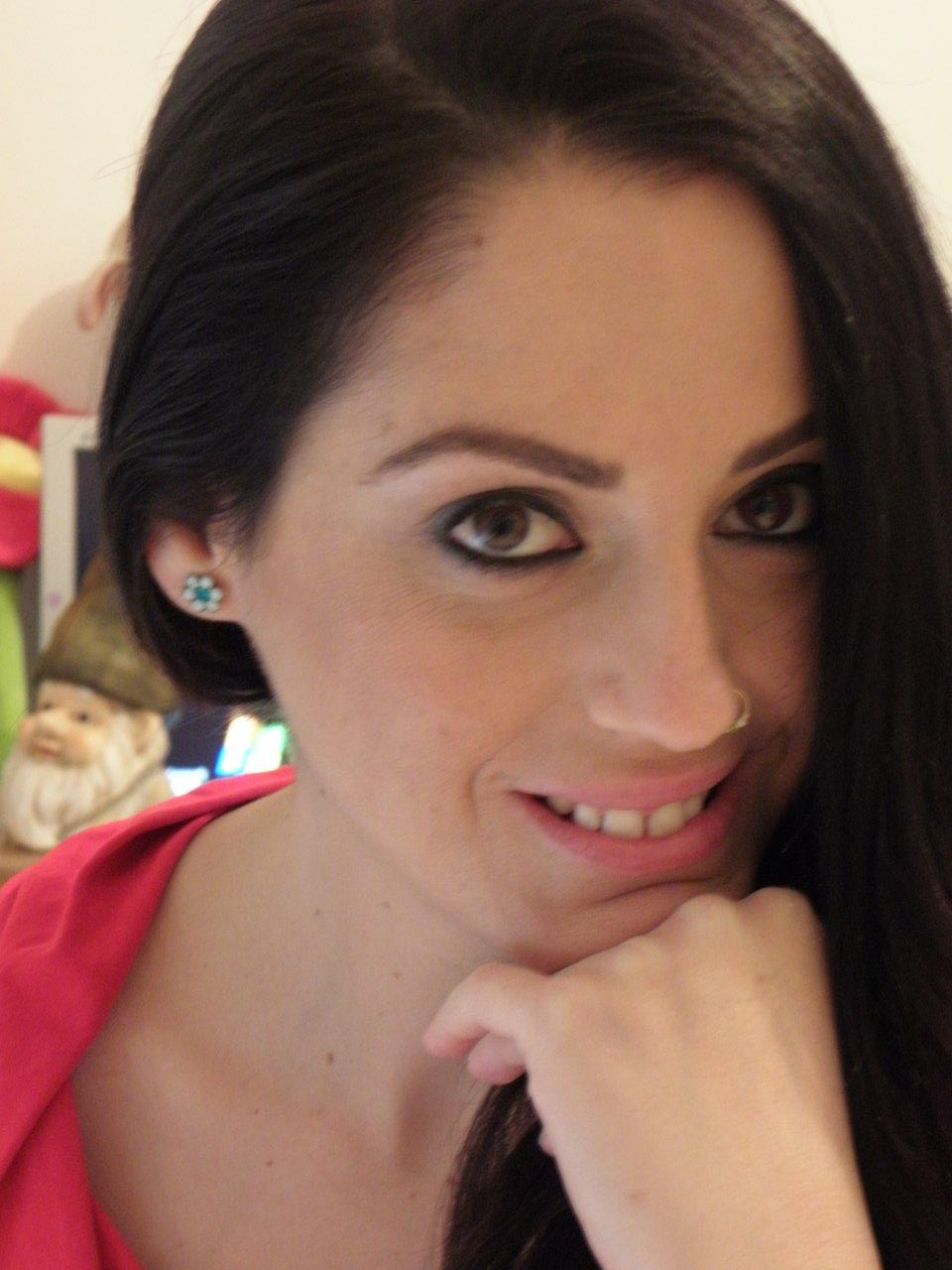
- Talia Rahimi, 2012 (Photographer: Avner Galili)
- Born: 1978 (age 47–48); Rehovot, Israel
- Citizenship: Israeli
- Occupation: Author
- Writing career
- Language: Hebrew
- Years active: 2010–present
- Genre: Children's literature
- Notable works: Pitsirika; Zeor the Dinosaur

Talia Rahimi (Hebrew: טליה רחימי; born 1978) is an Israeli author, poet, teacher and linguist.

== Biography ==
Talia Rahimi was born in Rehovot. Her dream of writing began, in her words, when she was in third or fourth grade, when she wrote stories, which she dreamed of publishing one day, in a notebook which she called "Stories".

Rahimi has a degree in education, linguistics and English literature from Ben Gurion University.

Together with her friend, Efrat Marco, Rahimi established the "Ling" language school.

In 2010, she published her first book, "Pitsirika", intended for a youth audience.

In 2012, she published a children's book entitled "Zeor the Dinosaur" (Hebrew: זאור הדינוזאור).

== Books ==
- Pitsirika (Hakibbutz Hameuchad, 2010) - OCLC 745382662
- Zeor the Dinosaur (Hakibbutz Hameuchad, 2012) - OCLC 782085811
